= Commodores discography =

- Studio albums: 15
- Live albums: 1
- Compilation albums: 9
- Singles: 39

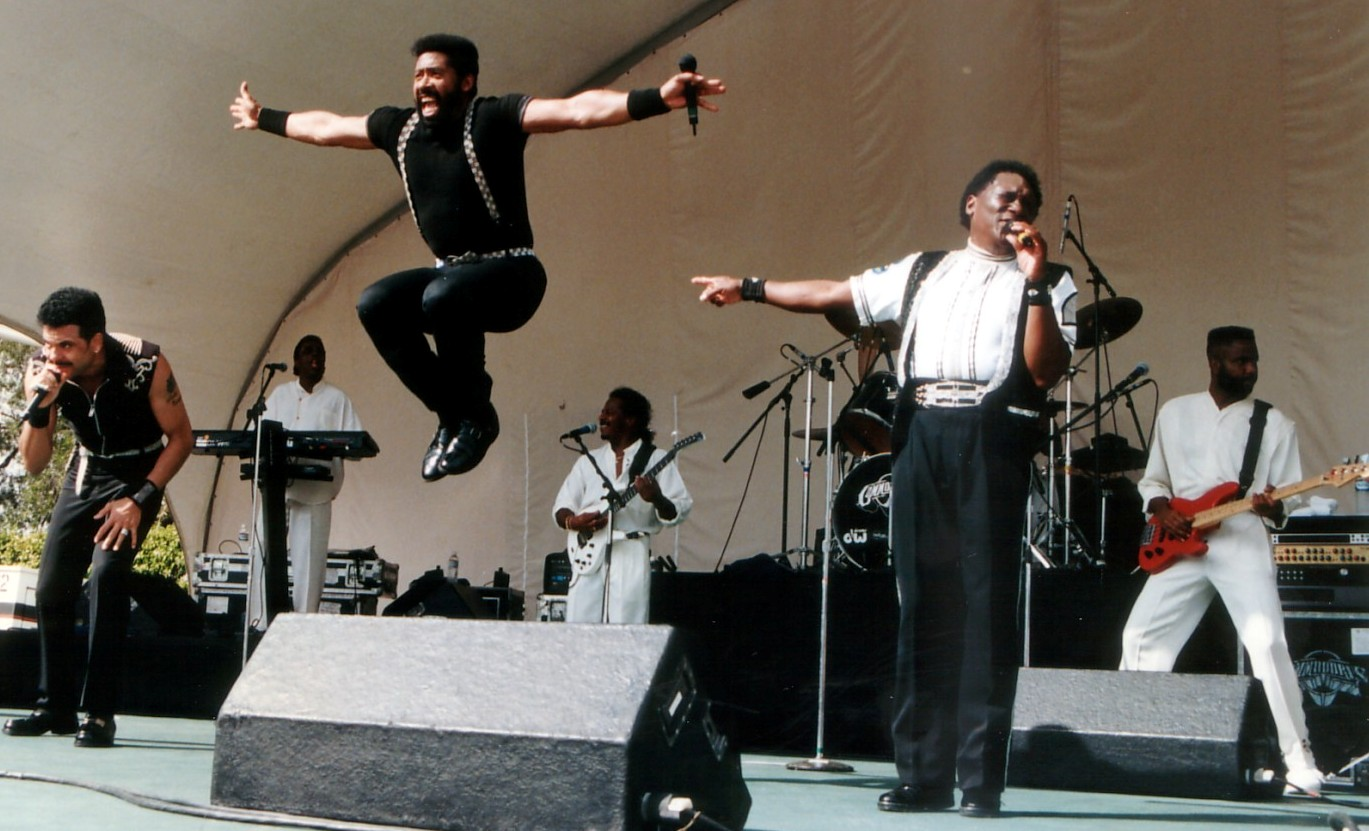
The Commodores performing at Gulfstream Park in Hallandale, FL

The discography of American soul band the Commodores includes 15 studio albums and 39 singles spanning three decades, from 1974 to 1993.

The band reached the top of the Billboard charts twice with their international smash hit singles "Three Times a Lady" and "Still". They also topped the US R&B singles chart on seven occasions. The Commodores also reached the top 10 no fewer than five times in the US with hit albums Commodores, Commodores Live!, Natural High, Midnight Magic and Heroes.

== Albums ==
=== Studio albums ===
Title	Album details	Peak chart positions										Certifications
Title	Album details	US	US R&B	AUS	CAN	GER	NLD	NZ	SWE	SWI	UK	Certifications
Machine Gun	Released: July 1974; Label: Motown	138	22	95	—	—	—	27	—	—	—	AUS: Gold; NGA: Gold
Caught in the Act	Released: February 1975; Label: Motown	26	7	59	80	—	—	—	—	—	—	
Movin' On	Released: October 1975; Label: Motown	29	7	80	55	—	—	—	—	—	—	US: Gold
Hot on the Tracks	Released: June 1976; Label: Motown	12	1	93	28	—	—	39	—	—	—	US: Platinum
Commodores (Zoom in the Australia/UK)	Released: March 1977; Label: Motown	3	1	62	23	—	—	11	—	—	—	US: Platinum
Natural High	Released: May 1978; Label: Motown	3	1	14	3	—	5	5	—	—	8	NLD: Gold; NZ: Gold; UK: Gold; US: Platinum
Midnight Magic	Released: July 1979; Label: Motown	3	1	56	17	—	9	7	44	—	15	NLD: Gold; NZ: Gold; UK: Gold; US: Platinum
Heroes	Released: June 1980; Label: Motown	7	3	94	36	—	44	45	—	—	50	US: Platinum
In the Pocket	Released: June 1981; Label: Motown	13	4	48	29	—	21	45	25	—	69	US: Platinum
Commodores 13	Released: September 1983; Label: Motown	103	26	—	—	—	—	—	—	—	—	
Nightshift	Released: January 1985; Label: Motown	12	1	44	22	4	1	13	22	8	13	US: Gold
United	Released: October 1986; Label: Polydor	101	17	—	—	62	44	—	50	28	—	
Rock Solid	Released: July 1988; Label: Polydor	—	—	—	—	—	—	—	—	—	—	
Commodores Christmas	Released: November 1992; Label: Commodores	—	—	—	—	—	—	—	—	—	—	
No Tricks	Released: March 1993; Label: Commodores	—	—	—	—	—	—	—	—	—	—	
"—" denotes items that did not chart or were not released in that territory.

=== Compilation albums ===
- There are many compilation albums by Commodores. This is a selected list of albums that charted.

Title	Album details	Peak chart positions										Certifications
Title	Album details	US	US R&B	AUS	CAN	GER	NED	NZ	SWE	SWI	UK	Certifications
Greatest Hits	Released: 10 November 1978; Label: Motown	23	24	85	12	—	22	12	—	—	19	UK: Gold
Love Songs	Released: 6 August 1982; Label: K-tel	—	—	—	—	—	—	—	—	—	5	UK: Gold
The Best Of	Released: September 1982; Label: Arcade	—	—	—	—	—	5	—	—	—	—	
All the Great Hits	Released: 5 November 1982; Label: Motown	37	—	—	—	—	—	30	—	—	—	US: Gold
Anthology (All the Great Hits in the Australia)	Released: May 1983; Label: Motown	141	—	65	—	—	—	—	—	—	—	
The Very Best Of	Released: November 1985; Label: Telstar	—	—	—	—	—	24	—	—	—	25	UK: Gold
The Very Best Of The Commodores	Released: May 1995; Label: Motown	—	—	—	—	—	—	39	—	—	26	UK: Silver
20th Century Masters The Millennium Collection	Released: November 1999; Label: Motown/Universal	155	—	—	—	—	—	—	—	—	—	US: Gold
The Definitive Collection (Lionel Richie and Commodores)	Released: November 2003; Label: Motown/UMTV	19	—	16	—	40	23	7	31	45	1	US: Platinum; AUS: Platinum; NZ: Platinum; UK: 4× Platinum
"—" denotes items that did not chart or were not released in that territory.

=== Live albums ===
Title	Album details	Peak chart positions					
Title	Album details	US	US R&B	CAN	NED	NZ	UK
Commodores Live!	Released: October 1977; Label: Motown	3	2	26	7	8	60

== Singles ==
Year	Title	Peak chart positions											Certifications	Album
Year	Title	US Pop	US AC	US R&B	AUS	BEL	CAN	GER	IRE	NED	NZ	UK	Certifications	Album
1974	"Machine Gun"	22	—	7	95	—	20	—	—	—	—	20		Machine Gun
1974	"The Zoo (The Human Zoo)"	—	—	—	—	—	—	—	—	—	—	44		Machine Gun
1974	"I Feel Sanctified"	75	—	12	—	—	—	—	—	—	—	—		Machine Gun
1975	"Slippery When Wet"	19	—	1	—	—	38	—	—	—	—	—		Caught in the Act
1975	"This Is Your Life"	—	—	13	—	—	—	—	—	—	—	—		Caught in the Act
1975	"Sweet Love" ^{A}	5	—	2	—	—	16	—	—	—	16	32		Movin' On
1976	"Just to Be Close to You"	7	—	1	94	—	19	—	—	—	—	62		Hot on the Tracks
1977	"Fancy Dancer"	39	—	9	—	—	65	—	—	—	—	—		Hot on the Tracks
1977	"Easy"	4	14	1	75	—	12	—	—	24	9	9	UK: Platinum; NZ: 5× Platinum	Commodores
1977	"Brick House" ^{A}	5	—	4	—	30	24	—	—	15	2	32	US: Gold; NZ: Gold	Commodores
1978	"Too Hot ta Trot"	24	—	1	—	—	25	—	—	—	36	38		Commodores Live!
1978	"Zoom"	—	—	—	—	—	—	—	—	—	—	38		Commodores Live!
1978	"Three Times a Lady"	1	1	1	1	7	1	30	1	3	2	1	UK: Gold; NZ: Gold	Natural High
1978	"Flying High"	38	—	21	—	—	47	—	—	—	—	37		Natural High
1979	"Sail On"	4	9	8	86	14	3	—	8	8	6	8	US: Gold	Midnight Magic
1979	"Still"	1	6	1	38	—	2	—	3	16	13	4	UK: Silver; US: Gold	Midnight Magic
1980	"Wonderland"	25	43	21	—	—	70	—	—	—	—	40		Midnight Magic
1980	"Old-Fashion Love"	20	47	8	—	—	70	—	—	—	—	—		Heroes
1980	"Heroes"	54	44	27	—	—	—	—	—	—	—	—		Heroes
1980	"Jesus Is Love"	—	—	34	—	—	—	—	—	—	—	—		Heroes
1981	"Lady (You Bring Me Up)"	8	13	5	34	17	27	64	—	15	1	56		In the Pocket
1981	"Oh No"	4	5	5	51	—	3	—	—	—	49	44		In the Pocket
1982	"Why You Wanna Try Me"	66	—	42	—	—	—	—	—	—	—	—		In the Pocket
1982	"Lucy"	—	—	—	—	—	—	—	—	—	—	—		In the Pocket
1982	"Painted Picture"	70	—	19	—	—	—	—	—	—	—	—		All the Great Hits
1983	"Reach High"	—	—	—	—	—	—	—	—	—	—	—		All the Great Hits
1983	"Only You"	54	8	20	—	—	—	—	—	—	—	93		Commodores 13
1984	"Turn Off the Lights"	—	—	—	—	—	—	—	—	—	—	—		Commodores 13
1985	"Nightshift"	3	2	1	8	2	7	4	3	1	2	3	CAN: Gold; UK: Silver; NZ: Platinum	Nightshift
1985	"Animal Instinct"	43	—	22	—	24	—	39	—	—	—	74		Nightshift
1985	"Janet"	87	8	65	—	29	—	—	—	—	—	90		Nightshift
1986	"Goin' to the Bank"	65	—	2	—	11	—	34	—	13	39	43		United
1986	"Take It from Me"	—	—	38	—	—	—	—	—	—	—	—		United
1986	"United in Love"	—	22	—	—	—	—	—	—	—	—	—		United
1988	"Easy" (re-release)	—	—	—	—	—	—	—	18	—	—	15		The Very Best Of
1988	"Solitaire"	—	—	51	—	—	—	—	—	—	—	—		Rock Solid
1988	"Homeless"	—	—	—	—	—	—	—	—	—	—	—		Rock Solid
1988	"Grrip"	—	—	—	—	—	—	—	—	—	—	—		Rock Solid
1993	"Everything Reminds Me of You"	—	—	—	—	—	—	—	—	—	—	—		No Tricks
"—" denotes items that did not chart or were not released in that territory.

- ^{A} "Brick House" and "Sweet Love" were released in the UK as a double A-side single.
