= Gold (Lionel Richie album) =

Compilation album by Lionel Richie & Commodores
- Released: January 10, 2006
- Genre: R&B; pop; rock
- Length: 2:38:34
- Label: Hip-O Records; Motown Records; Universal Records
- Producer: James Anthony Carmichael; Commodores; Lionel Richie; David Foster; Narada Michael Walden; Jimmy Jam and Terry Lewis

Lionel Richie chronology
Just for You (2004)	Gold (2006)	Coming Home (2006)

Commodores chronology
The Definitive Collection (2003)	Gold (2006)	Greatest Hits, Vol. 1 (2007)

Professional ratings
Review scores
Source	Rating
AllMusic	4/5 stars

Gold is a two disc compilation album by American R&B singer Lionel Richie and American Funk and soul band Commodores, released on January 10, 2006. It contains songs from both his successful solo career and as part of the band the Commodores.

== Track listing ==
All tracks are written by Lionel Richie, except where noted.

Disc 1
No.	Title	Writer(s)	Original release	Length
1.	"All Night Long (All Night)"		Can't Slow Down (1983)	6:22
2.	"Penny Lover"		Can't Slow Down	5:33
3.	"Say You, Say Me"		Dancing on the Ceiling (1986)	4:01
4.	"My Destiny"		Back to Front (1992)	4:50
5.	"Running with the Night"	Richie; Cynthia Weil	Can't Slow Down	5:58
6.	"Dancing on the Ceiling"	Richie; Carlos Rios; Michael Frenchik	Dancing on the Ceiling	4:32
7.	"Love, Oh Love"	Richie; Brenda Harvey-Richie	Back to Front	5:47
8.	"Ballerina Girl"		Dancing on the Ceiling	3:39
9.	"My Love"		Lionel Richie (1982)	4:05
10.	"Love Will Conquer All"	Richie; Weil; Greg Phillinganes	Dancing on the Ceiling	5:41
11.	"Do It to Me"		Back to Front	6:05
12.	"Cinderella"	Richie; Joe Wolfe	Renaissance (2000)	3:43
13.	"Angel"	Richie; Paul Barry; Mark Taylor	Renaissance	4:15
14.	"Don't Wanna Lose You"	Richie; James Harris III; Terry Lewis	Louder Than Words (1996)	5:00
15.	"Sweet Love" (by the Commodores)		Movin' On (1975)	6:35
16.	"Oh No" (by Commodores)		In the Pocket (1981)	3:00

Disc 2
No.	Title	Writer(s)	Original release	Length
1.	"Hello"		Can't Slow Down	4:09
2.	"Endless Love" (Duet with Diana Ross)		Endless Love OST (1981)	4:26
3.	"Three Times a Lady" (by Commodores)		Natural High (1978)	6:40
4.	"Sail On" (by Commodores)		Midnight Magic (1979)	5:35
5.	"Stuck On You"		Can't Slow Down	3:12
6.	"You Are"	Richie; Harvey-Richie	Lionel Richie	5:01
7.	"Truly"		Lionel Richie	3:21
8.	"Easy (extended version)" (by Commodores)		Commodores (1977)	4:51
9.	"Still" (by Commodores)		Midnight Magic	5:49
10.	"Just to Be Close to You" (by Commodores)		Hot on the Tracks (1976)	6:24
11.	"Lady (You Bring Me Up)" (by Commodores)	William King; Harold Hudson; Shirley Hanna-King	In the Pocket	4:50
12.	"Machine Gun" (by Commodores)	Milan Williams	Machine Gun (1974)	2:40
13.	"Brick House" (by Commodores)	Richie; Williams; Walter Orange; Ronald LaPread; Thomas McClary; King	Commodores	3:43
14.	"Too Hot ta Trot" (by Commodores)	Richie; Williams; Orange; LaPread; McClary; King	Commodores Live! (1977)	5:38
15.	"Zoom" (by Commodores)	Richie; LaPread	Commodores	7:04
16.	"Jesus Is Love" (by Commodores)		Heroes (1980)	6:05

== Charts ==
Chart (2007)	Peak position
UK (Official Charts Company)	147

Chart (2025)	Peak position
Greek Albums (IFPI)	16
