= The Very Best of The Commodores (1995 album) =

The Very Best Of The Commodores

Compilation album by Commodores
- Released: May 1995
- Genres: Funk; soul
- Label: Motown
- Producers: James Anthony Carmichael; Commodores

Commodores chronology
No Tricks (1993)	The Very Best Of The Commodores (1995)	20th Century Masters – The Millennium Collection: The Best of The Commodores (1999)

Professional ratings
Review scores
Source	Rating
Allmusic	4.5/5 stars

The Very Best of The Commodores is the seventh compilation album by American funk/soul band Commodores, released in 1995 on Motown Records. The album charted at No. 26 on the UK Pop Albums chart and at No. 39 on the New Zealand Pop Albums chart. The album has been certified Silver in the UK by the BPI.

== Track listing ==
1. "Easy" (Lionel Richie) from the album Commodores (1977) – 4:22
2. "Three Times A Lady" (Lionel Richie) from the album Natural High (1978) – 3:38
3. "Nightshift" (Walter Orange, Dennis Lambert, Franne Golde) from the album Nightshift (1985) – 4:24
4. "Brick House" (Shirley Hanna-King, Lionel Richie, Milan Williams, Walter Orange, Ronald La Pread, Thomas McClary, William King) from the album Commodores – 3:35
5. "Machine Gun" (Milan Williams) from the album Machine Gun (1974) – 2:42
6. "Zoom" (Lionel Richie, Ronald LaPread) from the album Commodores – 4:22
7. "Old-Fashion Love" (Milan Williams) from the album Heroes (1980) – 3:25
8. "Sail On" (Lionel Richie) from the album Midnight Magic (1979) – 3:58
9. "Lady (You Bring Me Up)" (Harold Hudson, William King, Shirley Hanna-King) from the album In the Pocket (1981) – 4:04
10. "Oh No" (Lionel Richie) from the album In the Pocket – 3:03
11. "Too Hot Ta Trot" (William King, Ronald LaPread, Thomas McClary, Walter Orange, Lionel Richie, Milan Williams) from the album Commodores Live! (1977) – 3:33
12. "The Zoo" (The Human Zoo) (Gloria Jones, Pam Sawyer) from the album Machine Gun – 3:08
13. "Still" (Lionel Richie) from the album Midnight Magic – 3:46
14. "Sweet Love" (Lionel Richie) from the album Movin' On (1975) – 3:29
15. "Janet" (Bobby Caldwell, Franne Golde, Paul Fox) from the album Nightshift – 3:43
16. "Flying High" (Lionel Richie, Thomas McClary) from the album Natural High – 3:55
17. "Only You" (Milan Williams) from the album Commodores 13 (1983) – 4:29
18. Animal Instinct (Martin Page) from the album Nightshift – 4:06
19. Just To Be Close To You (Lionel Richie) from the album Hot on the Tracks (1976) – 3:23
20. "Wonderland" (Milan Williams) from the album Midnight Magic – 3:48

== Personnel ==
- Lionel Richie – vocals, saxophone, keyboards
- Thomas McClary – vocals, guitar
- Milan Williams – keyboards
- Ronald LaPread – bass guitar
- William King – trumpet
- Walter Orange – drums, vocals, percussion
- J.D Nicholas – vocals on “Nightshift”
