= Greatest Hits (Commodores album) =

Greatest hits album by Commodores
- Released: October 1978
- Genres: Soul; funk
- Length: 36:54
- Label: Motown
- Producers: Commodores; James Anthony Carmichael

Commodores chronology
| Natural High (1978) | Greatest Hits (1978) | Midnight Magic (1979) |

Greatest Hits is an album by the Commodores, released on Motown Records in 1978. The album peaked at No. 19 on the UK Pop Albums chart and has been certified Gold by the British Phonographic Industry.

== Critical reception ==
Professional ratings
Review scores
| Source | Rating |
|---|---|
| AllMusic | 4/5 stars |
| Christgau's Record Guide | B− |

Robert Christgau found that the Commodores "ain't as funky as they used to be. Or maybe they were never really a funk band to begin with--just potential pros who understood funk's entertainment potential the way John Denver understood folk music's. If they perceive any inflammatory potential in rhythm per se, they do what they can to dampen the fire."

Ron Wynn of AllMusic called the album "a very representative anthology gathering The Commodores' prime up-tempo and ballad material. It shows that they were quite versatile in their heyday, capable of being humorous or romantic with equal ease."

== Track listing ==
1. "Brick House" - 3:24
2. "Sweet Love" - 3:23
3. "This Is Your Life" - 3:15
4. "Too Hot ta Trot" - 3:28
5. "Easy" - 4:14
6. "Fancy Dancer" - 3.40
7. "Just to Be Close to You" - 3:18
8. "Slippery When Wet" - 2:56
9. "Machine Gun" - 2:40
10. "Three Times a Lady" - 6:34

== Personnel ==
Commodores

- Lionel Richie
- Milan Williams
- William King
- Thomas McClary
- Ronald LaPread
- Walter Orange

The Mean Machine

- David Cochrane
- Harold Hudson
- Darrell Jones
- Winston Sims

Production

- Commodores – producers, arrangements
- James Anthony Carmichael – producer, arrangements
- Suzee Ikeda – album coordinator
- Brenda Boyce – product manager
- Norm Ung – art direction
- George Carsillo – cover design
- Tom Nikosey – logo design
- Neil Zlozower – photography
- David B. Mattingly – illustration
