= The Very Best of Commodores =

The Very Best Of

Compilation album by Commodores
- Released: November 1985
- Recorded: 1974–1985
- Genre: R&B
- Label: Telstar
- Producers: Commodores; James Anthony Carmichael; Dennis Lambert

Commodores chronology
Nightshift (1985)	The Very Best Of (1985)	United (1986)

The Very Best of Commodores is an album by Commodores, released in November 1985 by Telstar Records. The album peaked at No. 25 on the UK Top Albums chart and has been certified Gold in the UK by the BPI.

== Track listing ==
1. "Three Times a Lady"
2. "Still"
3. "Sail On"
4. "Lady (You Bring Me Up)"
5. "Wonderland"
6. "Oh No"
7. "Too Hot ta Trot"
8. "Nightshift"
9. "Easy"
10. "Janet"
11. "Flying High"
12. "Lucy"
13. "Just to Be Close to You"
14. "Machine Gun"
15. "Brick House"

== Charts ==
Chart (1985)	Peak position
UK Top 100 Albums (Official Charts Company)	25
Dutch Album Top 100	24
