= Live! (Commodores album) =

1977 live album by Commodores

Commodores Live!

Live album by Commodores
- Released: October 1977
- Recorded: 1977
- Genres: Funk, soul
- Length: 1:13:01
- Label: Motown
- Producers: Commodores; James Anthony Carmichael

Commodores chronology
Commodores (1977)	Commodores Live! (1977)	Natural High (1978)

Professional ratings
Review scores
Source	Rating
AllMusic	4/5 stars

Live!, or Commodores Live!, is a live album by the American band Commodores, released in 1977. The album reached number 3 on the Billboard 200 chart.

The album was recorded during the Commodores' 1976–1977 coast-to-coast US tour, primarily during their Atlanta and Washington D.C. shows. The last track, "Too Hot ta Trot", is a studio recording created for the film Thank God It's Friday.

== Track listing ==
Motown – M9-894A2

Side one
No.	Title	Writer(s)	Length
1.	"Won't You Come Dance With Me"	Thomas McClary, Lionel Richie	3:36
2.	"Slippery When Wet"	Thomas McClary, Walter Orange	3:00
3.	"Come Inside"	Thomas McClary, Lionel Richie	3:12
4.	"Just to Be Close to You"	Lionel Richie	7:17

Side two
No.	Title	Writer(s)	Length
1.	"Funny Feelings"	Thomas McClary, Lionel Richie	5:16
2.	"Fancy Dancer"	Lionel Richie, Ronald LaPread	4:44
3.	"Sweet Love"	Lionel Richie	8:39

Side three
No.	Title	Writer(s)	Length
1.	"Zoom"	Thomas McClary, Lionel Richie	10:00
2.	"Easy"	Lionel Richie	7:23

Side four
No.	Title	Writer(s)	Length
1.	"I Feel Sanctified"	Jeffrey Bowen, Ronald LaPread, Thomas McClary, Walter Orange, Lionel Richie, Milan Williams	2:58
2.	"Brick House"	William King, Ronald LaPread, Thomas McClary, Walter Orange, Lionel Richie, Milan Williams	11:18
3.	"Too Hot Ta Trot"	William King, Ronald LaPread, Thomas McClary, Walter Orange, Lionel Richie, Milan Williams	5:38
Total length:			1:13:01

== Personnel ==
Commodores

- Lionel Richie
- William King
- Milan Williams
- Thomas McClary
- Ronald LaPread
- Walter Orange

The Mean Machine

- David Cochrane
- Harold Hudson
- Darrell Jones
- Winston Sims

=== Production ===
- Commodores – producers
- James Anthony Carmichael – producer
- Cal Harris – recording, mixing
- Jane Clark – recording
- Jack Andrews – mastering
- Tony Jones – album coordinator
- Suzee Ikeda – project manager
- Stan Martin – art direction, design
- Neil Zlozower – photography
- Benjamin Ashburn & Associates – management

== Charts ==
Year	Chart	Peak position
1977	US Billboard Top LPs & Tape	3
1977	US Billboard Top Soul LPs	2
1977	Holland	7
1977	New Zealand	8
