= Love Songs (Commodores album) =

Compilation album by Commodores
- Released: August 1982
- Genre: R&B
- Label: K-Tel
- Producers: Commodores, James Anthony Carmichael

Commodores chronology
In The Pocket (1981)	Love Songs (1982)	All the Great Hits (1982)

Love Songs is a compilation album by Commodores, released in August 1982 on Motown Records. The album peaked at No. 5 on the UK Top Albums chart. Love Songs has been certified Gold in the UK by the BPI.

== Track listing ==
1. "Three Times a Lady" - 3:34
2. "Old Fashioned Love" - 3:20
3. "Easy" - 4:08
4. "This Love" - 5:12
5. "Sail On" - 3:56
6. "Wonderland" - 3:46
7. "Zoom" - 4:20
8. "Still" - 3:40
9. "Sweet Love" - 3:23
10. "Saturday Night" - 4:54
11. "Lucy" - 4:54
12. "Just to Be Close to You" - 3:22
13. "Heaven Knows" - 4:45
14. "Oh No" - 2:56
