= Fancy Dancer (song) =

Single by Commodores

from the album Hot on the Tracks
- B-side: "Cebu"
- Released: November 18, 1976
- Recorded: 1976, Motown
- Genre: R&B, funk
- Length: 3:40
- Label: Motown
- Songwriters: Ronald LaPread, Lionel Richie
- Producer: James Anthony Carmichael

Commodores singles chronology
"Just to Be Close to You" (1976)	"Fancy Dancer" (1976)	"Easy" (1977)

"Fancy Dancer" is a song by American funk/R&B band Commodores, released as a single in 1977 on Motown Records. The song peaked at No. 9 on the US Billboard Hot Soul Singles chart and No. 39 on the US Billboard Hot 100 chart.

== Critical reception ==
Jason Elias of AllMusic remarked, "With a hot woman as its muse, "Fancy Dancer" has a sound and arrangement that's the aural equivalent of the woman gyrating on the dancefloor. This track, like most of their pre-1981 funkier tracks, seemed to embody a randy nature, different than the Bar-Keys but just as potent in a relaxed and adventurous way".

Alex Petridis of The Guardian commented, "it's less celebrated than Brick House, but just as funky, in a low-slung way."
