= Heroes (Commodores album) =

Studio album by The Commodores
- Released: June 1980
- Genres: Soul; R&B; Gospel
- Length: 43:26
- Label: Motown
- Producers: James Anthony Carmichael; The Commodores

The Commodores chronology
Midnight Magic (1979)	Heroes (1980)	In the Pocket (1981)

Heroes is the eighth studio album by the Commodores, released in June 1980 by Motown Records. This album has been certified platinum in the US by the RIAA.

== Critical reception ==
Professional ratings
Review scores
Source	Rating
AllMusic	3/5 stars
Robert Christgau	B
Smash Hits	9/10

With a 9 out of 10 rating, Bev Hillier of Smash Hits called Heroes "a highly polished, versatile album." Phyl Garland of Stereo Review praised the album, writing: "On it they explore a broad range of subjects and show a willingness to tackle material that is not so obviously tailored to ride the charts. Furthermore, they have gone beyond the simplistic boy -loves -girl and dance -dance -dance lyrics that are the formula staples of contemporary soul music. The album offers plenty of the kind of soul funk we have come to expect of the Commodores, performed with stunning precision, but there are also some interesting variations." Robert Christgau of The Village Voice gave a B, describing Heroes as "an improvement. For one thing, most of the brotherhood anthems--which avoid the gender-specific, actually, with lots of "people," "folks," and "y'all"—have a somewhat more rousing beat than "Three Times a Lady." And on the fond "Old-Fashion Love" and the cold-hearted "Sorry to Say," the brothers remind Lionel that this is still supposed to be a funk band."

== Accolades ==
Heroes was nominated for a Grammy award in the category of Best R&B Performance by a Duo or Group with Vocals.

== Songs ==
Record World said of the title track that "Lionel Ritchie sings with loving sincerity." Record World said of "Old-Fashion Love" that "Multi-octave vocal carousing and a funky percussion backdrop provide the setting on this plea for some premium love." Record World called the single "Jesus Is Love" an "inspirational ballad."

== Track listing ==
1. "Got to Be Together" (Lionel Richie, Thomas McClary) – 5:44
2. "Celebrate" (Harold Hudson, Larry Davis, Thomas McClary) – 5:03
3. "Old-Fashion Love" (Milan Williams) – 4:56
4. "Heroes" (Darrell Jones, Lionel Richie) – 5:24
5. "All The Way Down" (David Cochrane, Walter Orange) – 3:35
6. "Sorry to Say" (Darrell Jones, Ronald LaPread) – 4:01
7. "Wake Up Children" (Lionel Richie, Thomas McClary) – 4:33
8. "Mighty Spirit" (Harold Hudson, William King) – 4:06
9. "Jesus is Love" (Lionel Richie) – 6:04

== Personnel ==
Commodores

- Lionel Richie – vocals, saxophones, acoustic piano, keyboards
- Milan Williams – keyboards
- Thomas McClary – vocals, lead guitar
- Ronald LaPread – vocals, bass
- Walter Orange – vocals, drums, percussions
- William King – vocals, percussion, trumpet

The Mean Machine

- David Cochrane – keyboards, rhythm guitar, saxophones
- Harold Hudson – keyboards, trumpet
- Darrell Jones – rhythm guitar
- Winston Sims – saxophones

Additional musicians

- Ollie E. Brown – drums
- Eddie "Bongo" Brown – percussion
- James Anthony Carmichael – horn and string arrangements

Choir on "Jesus is Love"

- Billie Barnum
- Paulette Brown
- Rosemary Butler
- Melinda Joyce Chatman
- Merry Clayton
- Carolyn Dennis
- Voncielle Faggett
- Yvonne Fair
- Venetta Fields
- Jim Gilstrap
- Joe Greene
- Lacarol Jackson
- Daline Jones
- Cleopatra Kennedy
- Clydie King
- Jesse Kirkland
- Sherlie Matthews
- Kathi Pinto
- Petsye Powell
- Lisa Roberts
- Alfie Silas
- Stephanie Spruill
- Phyllis St. James
- Stephanie Taylor
- Bill Thedford
- Dona Thedford
- Deborah Thomas
- Carmen Twillie
- Oren Waters

== Production ==
- Commodores – producers, arrangements
- James Anthony Carmichael – producer, arrangements
- Calvin Harris – engineer, mixing
- Jane Clark – engineer, mixing
- Chris Bellman – mastering
- Suzee Ikeda – project manager
- Jo-Ann Geffen – package coordinator
- Ginny Livingston – art direction
- Tom Nikosky – art direction, cover art
- Gene Gurley – photography

== Charts ==
=== Album ===
1980	Billboard US R&B	3
1980	Billboard US Pop	7
1980	Sweden	26
1980	Holland	44
1980	New Zealand	45
1980	Australia	94

=== Singles ===
Year	Single	Chart positions		
Year	Single	US	US R&B	US Dance
1980	"Old-Fashion Love"	20	8	—
1980	"Heroes"	54	27	—
1980	"Jesus Is Love"	-	34	—
