= Commodores 13 =

13

Studio album by Commodores
- Released: September 1983
- Recorded: 1983
- Studios: A&M Studios (Hollywood, California); Motown/Hitsville U.S.A. Recording Studios and The Village Recorder (Los Angeles, California)
- Genre: R&B
- Length: 35:20
- Label: Motown
- Producers: William King; Thomas McClary; Walter Orange; Milan Williams

Commodores chronology
All the Great Hits (1982)	13 (1983)	All the Great Love Songs (1984)

Professional ratings
Review scores
Source	Rating
AllMusic	2.5/5 stars
Rolling Stone	3/5 stars

Commodores 13 is the tenth studio album (and thirteenth overall, including two greatest-hits compilations and a live album) by the Commodores, released in 1983 on Motown Records. It's also the first album by the band after the departure of Lionel Richie - who began his solo career in 1982 - and the last to feature original guitarist Thomas McClary.

== Background ==
Commodores 13 was produced by William King, Thomas McClary, Walter Orange and Milan Williams. Singers Vesta Williams and Melissa Manchester made guest appearances on the album.

== Critical reception ==
Alex Henderson of Allmusic gave Commodores 13 a 2.5 out of 5 stars rating. Henderson remarked, in his review of the album, "Is Commodores 13 a masterpiece? No. This release isn't in a class with essential treasures like 1976's Hot on the Tracks or 1977's Commodores. But it isn't a bad album, and it indicated that there could be life after Lionel Richie for the Commodores."

Dave Marsh of Rolling Stone gave Commodores 13 a 3 out of 5 stars rating. Marsh in his review remarked "Not exactly the comeback of the year, but with Richie out of the way, both Thomas McClary and William King suggest they have some production and composing chops of their own."

== Track listing ==
Side one

1. "I'm in Love" (Harold Hudson, Shirley King, William King) – 4:05
2. "Turn Off the Lights" (Shirley King, William King) – 4:20
3. "Nothing Like a Woman" (Hudson, Walter Orange) – 4:56
4. "Captured" (Linda McClary, Thomas McClary) – 4:37

Side two

1. "Touchdown" (Michael Dunlap, Orange) – 4:30
2. "Welcome Home" (Bill Champlin, Thomas McClary) – 4:20
3. "Ooo, Woman You" (Melissa Manchester, Thomas McClary) – 4:22
4. "Only You" (Milan Williams) – 4:10

== Personnel ==
Commodores

- William King – synthesizers (2–4, 6, 7), horns (2, 4–6, 8)
- Milan Williams – keyboards (2–7), acoustic piano (8), Fender Rhodes (8), Oberheim synthesizer (8)
- Thomas McClary – lead and rhythm guitars (2, 3, 5, 7, 8), acoustic guitar (4), electric guitar (4), guitar solo (6), lead vocals (7)
- Ronald LaPread – bass guitar (2–4, 6–8)
- Walter Orange – drums, lead vocals (3–5, 8)

Additional musicians

- Michael Boddicker – acoustic piano (1), Fender Rhodes (1), synthesizers (1), synth bass (1), synth horns (6), synth strings (6), additional synthesizers (7)
- Harold Hudson – additional keyboards (3)
- David Cochrane – synthesizers (5, 7), vocoder (5), additional guitars (8)
- Bill Champlin – acoustic piano (6), Fender Rhodes (6), synth bass (6)
- Michael Dunlap – additional guitars (3, 5), additional keyboards (5), rhythm guitar (6), Moog synthesizer (7)
- Geno Findley – additional synthesizers (7)
- Michael Lang – additional keyboards (8)
- Paul Jackson Jr. – additional guitars (8)
- John Gilston – Simmons drums (7)
- Steve Schaeffer – additional drums (8)
- Paulinho da Costa – percussion (1, 3, 6, 7), effects (3)
- Rolene Marie Naveja – castanets (3)

Additional vocalists

- Harold Hudson – lead vocals (1, 2, 6), backing vocals (2)
- Bill Champlin – backing vocals (1, 3–8)
- David Cochrane – backing vocals (1–7)
- Phyllis St. James – backing vocals (1)
- Deborah Thomas – backing vocals (2, 4, 6, 7)
- Tandia Brenda White – backing vocals (5)
- Vesta Williams – backing vocals (5, 6, 8)
- Melissa Manchester – backing vocals (7)

Music arrangements

- Harold Hudson – rhythm and vocal arrangements (1–3)
- William King – rhythm and vocal arrangements (1, 2)
- Bruce Miller – horn and string arrangements (1–3, 5, 8)
- Shirley King – rhythm and vocal arrangements (2)
- Ronald LaPread – vocal arrangements (3)
- Walter Orange – rhythm arrangements (3, 5), vocal arrangements (5)
- Thomas McClary – horn and string arrangements (4, 6), rhythm and vocal arrangements (4, 6, 7)
- Gene Page – horn and string arrangements (4)
- Michael Dunlap – rhythm arrangements (5)
- Bill Champlin – vocal arrangements (6)
- Benjamin White – string arrangements (7)
- Milan Williams – horn and string arrangements (8), rhythm and vocal arrangements (8)

== Production ==
- William King – producer (1, 2)
- Walter Orange – producer (3, 5)
- Thomas McClary – producer (4, 6, 7)
- Milan Williams – producer (8)
- Jane Clark – executive recording and mixing engineer
- Brian Leshon – second recording engineer
- Magic Moreno – second recording engineer, additional recording, additional mixing
- Norman Whitfield – additional mixing
- Bernie Grundman – mastering at A&M Studios
- Suzee Ikeda – project manager
- Terry Taylor – art direction
- Mark Sennet – photography

== Charts ==
Chart (1983)	Peak position
US Billboard Top LPs & Tape	122
US Top R&B LPs	26
