= Machine Gun (Commodores song) =

Single by Commodores

from the album Machine Gun
- B-side: "There's a Song in My Heart"
- Released: April 23, 1974
- Recorded: 1974
- Genre: R&B, funk
- Length: 2:45
- Label: Motown
- Songwriter: Milan Williams
- Producer: James Anthony Carmichael

Commodores singles chronology
"Machine Gun" (1974)	"The Zoo (The Human Zoo)" (1974)

"Machine Gun" is a song by American funk/R&B band Commodores, released as a single in 1974 on Motown Records. The song peaked at No. 7 on the US Billboard Hot Soul Singles chart, No. 22 on the US Billboard Hot 100 chart, and No. 20 on the UK Singles chart.

== Critical reception ==
Al Melchior of American Songwriter claimed "The Commodores' first single was one of the band's funkiest, and its lack of vocals makes it all the easier to focus on the groove." Lucy Jones of NME called Machine Gun "two and a half minutes of funking Motown genius. Berry Gordy named the song after Milan White's bullet-hard clavinet playing because it reminded him of gunfire."

== Samples ==
"Machine Gun" was sampled by the Beastie Boys on the song "Hey Ladies" from their 1989 album Paul's Boutique.
