= In the Pocket (Commodores album) =

Studio album by Commodores
- Released: June 22, 1981
- Studios: Web IV (Atlanta, Georgia); A&M (Hollywood, California); Hitsville West (Hollywood, California)
- Genre: Soul
- Length: 36:27
- Label: Motown
- Producers: James Anthony Carmichael; Commodores

Commodores chronology
Heroes (1980)	In the Pocket (1981)	Love Songs (1982)

Singles from In the Pocket
- 1. "Lady (You Bring Me Up)" Released: June 1981; 2. "Oh No" Released: September 1981; 3. "Why You Wanna Try Me" Released: March 5, 1982 (UK); 4. "Lucy" Released: October 8, 1982 (UK)

Professional ratings
Review scores
Source	Rating
AllMusic	2.5/5 stars
The Boston Globe	(favourable)
The Rolling Stone Album Guide	3/5 stars
Stereo Review	(favourable)
The Village Voice	B−

In the Pocket is the ninth studio album by the American R&B/funk group the Commodores, released by Motown Records in 1981.

It is the last Commodores album to feature Lionel Richie, as he left the band to start a solo career the following year. The bulk of the album was recorded at Web IV Recording Studio in Atlanta, Georgia. This album contained two hit singles, "Lady (You Bring Me Up)" (U.S. No. 8) and "Oh No" (U.S. No. 4).

== Track listing ==
Side One
No.	Title	Writer(s)	Length
1.	"Lady (You Bring Me Up)"	Shirley Hanna-King, Harold Hudson, William King	4:46
2.	"Saturday Night"	Hudson, Thomas McClary	5:00
3.	"Keep on Taking Me Higher"	Hudson, McClary	5:19
4.	"Oh No"	Lionel Richie	2:51

Side Two
No.	Title	Writer(s)	Length
1.	"Why You Wanna Try Me"	David Cochrane, Richie	4:36
2.	"This Love"	Walter Orange	5:15
3.	"Been Loving You"	Orange	3:52
4.	"Lucy"	Richie	4:48

== Charts ==
=== Weekly charts ===
Chart (1981)	Peak position
Australia Albums (Kent Music Report)	48
Dutch Albums (Album Top 100)	21
New Zealand Albums (RMNZ)	45
Swedish Albums (Sverigetopplistan)	25
UK Albums (Official Charts)	69
US Billboard 200	13
US Top R&B Albums (Billboard)	4

=== Year-end charts ===
Chart (1981)	Position
US Billboard 200	97
US Top R&B/Hip-Hop Albums (Billboard)	46

== Certifications ==
Country	Organization	Year	Sales
United States	RIAA	1981	Platinum (1,000,000)

== Personnel ==
Commodores

- Lionel Richie – vocals, acoustic piano, keyboards, saxophones
- Milan Williams – keyboards, guitars, vocals
- Thomas McClary – vocals, guitars
- Ronald LaPread – bass, vocals
- Walter Orange – drums, vocals, percussion
- William King – percussion trumpet, vocals

The Mean Machine

- David Cochrane – keyboards, guitars, saxophones
- Harold Hudson – keyboards, trumpet, vocals
- Darrell Jones – guitars
- Winston Sims – saxophones

Additional personnel

- Deborah Thomas – vocals
- Allen Williams – vocals
- James Anthony Carmichael – horn and string arrangements
- Gene Page – rhythm arrangements (4, 8)

== Production ==
The bulk of the album was recorded at Web IV Recording Studio in Atlanta, Georgia.

- Commodores – producers, arrangements
- James Anthony Carmichael – producer, arrangements
- Calvin Harris – recording, mixing
- Jane Clark – additional engineer
- Tommy Cooper – assistant engineer (1–3, 5–7)
- Ed Seay – assistant engineer (1–3, 5–7)
- Richard Well – assistant engineer (1–3, 5–7)
- Skip Cottrell – assistant engineer (4, 8)
- Bernie Grundman – mastering
- Johnny Lee – art direction
- David Alexander – photography
- Suzee Ikeda – project manager
