= Caught in the Act (Commodores album) =

Studio album by The Commodores
- Released: February 1975
- Recorded: 1974
- Studio: Motown Recording Studios (Hollywood, California)
- Genres: Funk, soul, R&B
- Length: 38:07
- Label: Motown
- Producers: Commodores; James Anthony Carmichael

The Commodores chronology
Machine Gun (1974)	Caught in the Act (1975)	Movin' On (1975)

Singles from Caught in the Act
- 1. "Slippery When Wet" Released: April 2, 1975; 2. "This Is Your Life" Released: 1975

Professional ratings
Review scores
Source	Rating
AllMusic	4.5/5 stars
Christgau's Record Guide	B

Caught in the Act is the second studio album by The Commodores, released in 1975 (see 1975 in music). Caught in the Act included the #1 R&B hit "Slippery When Wet", penned by Thomas McClary, the sextet's lead guitarist.

Caught In The Act was the second Commodores album to be certified gold. It rose to #7 on the Billboard R&B/Soul Albums chart and #26 on the Billboard Top 100 Albums listing during the summer of 1975. It received generally positive reviews. The album displayed clear influences from fellow funk contemporaries Sly and the Family Stone, Kool & the Gang, Earth, Wind & Fire and the Ohio Players, but yet the former opening act for the Jackson 5 was on its way to developing a sound that became all their own. They were a tight, self-contained unit that composed all their own material, unlike what was presented on their debut album, which included songs by outside writers. Lead vocals were handled by drummer/percussionist Walter "Clyde" Orange and pianist/saxophonist Lionel Richie.

The third track on Caught In The Act, "The Bump", composed by group keyboardist Milan Williams, is an edited version of the fourth track in their preceding hit album, Machine Gun. "I'm Ready", also a Williams composition, is a punchy instrumental dance number with a prominent clavinet line, in the same vein as their earlier hit, "Machine Gun". Other solid funk tracks include "Wide Open", "Better Never Than Forever" and "Look What You've Done to Me". "Let's Do It Right" by Lionel Richie echoes the smoother side of Sly and the Family Stone's work. While Caught In The Act is overwhelmingly upbeat, it doesn't neglect the slower material: "This Is Your Life" and "You Don't Know That I Know" are first rate funk ballads; the former, written by Richie, was released in an edited version as a single that same year and peaked at #13 on the Billboard R&B charts.

== Track listing ==
Motown – M6-820S1

Side one
No.	Title	Writer(s)	Length
1.	"Wide Open"	Walter Orange	3:31
2.	"Slippery When Wet"	Thomas McClary	3:20
3.	"The Bump"	Milan Williams	2:52
4.	"I'm Ready"	Milan Williams	3:23
5.	"This Is Your Life"	Lionel Richie	5:53

Side two
No.	Title	Writer(s)	Length
1.	"Let's Do It Right"	Lionel Richie	3:45
2.	"Better Never Than Forever"	Milan Williams	3:48
3.	"Look What You've Done to Me"	Ronald LaPread	4:00
4.	"You Don't Know That I Know"	Lionel Richie, Thomas McClary, Milan Williams	6:35
5.	"Wide Open (Reprise)"	Walter Orange	1:00
Total length:			38:07

== Personnel ==
Commodores

- Lionel Richie – vocals, saxophones, keyboards
- Milan Williams – keyboards
- Thomas McClary – vocals, guitars
- Ronald LaPread – bass
- Walter Orange – vocals, drums, percussion
- William King – trumpet

== Production ==
- Commodores – producers, arrangements
- James Anthony Carmichael – producer, arrangements, horn arrangements
- Cal Harris – recording, mixing
- Benjamin Ashburn – album coordinator, management
- Katarina Pettersson – art direction
- Jim Britt – photography

== Charts ==
Year	Chart positions		
Year	US	US R&B	Aus
1975	26	7	59

=== Singles ===
Year	Single	Chart positions	
Year	Single	US	US R&B
1975	"Slippery When Wet"	19	1
1975	"This Is Your Life"	—	13
