= Natural High (Commodores album) =

Studio album by Commodores
- Released: May 1978
- Recorded: 1978
- Genres: Pop; R&B
- Length: 41:41
- Label: Motown
- Producers: James Anthony Carmichael; Commodores

Commodores chronology
Commodores Live! (1977)	Natural High (1978)	Greatest Hits (1978)

Singles from Natural High
- 1. "Three Times a Lady" Released: June 9, 1978; 2. "Flying High" Released: August 31, 1978

Natural High is the sixth studio album by the musical group Commodores, released in 1978. "Three Times a Lady", released as a single, became their first Billboard Hot 100 number one. The album topped Billboard's R&B Album charts for 8 non-consecutive weeks and peaked at number three on the Billboard 200.

== Critical reception ==
Professional ratings
Review scores
Source	Rating
AllMusic	3/5 stars
The Village Voice	C−

Natural High earned the group a 1979 Grammy Award nomination for Best R&B Performance by a Duo, Group or Chorus.

Record World called the single "Flying High" a "classically slick r&b hip swinger with cross format appeal."

== Track listing ==
Motown – M7-902R1

Side one
No.	Title	Writer(s)	Length
1.	"Fire Girl"	William King, David Cochrane, Darryl Jones	4:12
2.	"X-Rated Movie"	Milan Williams	4:45
3.	"Flying High"	Lionel Richie, Thomas McClary	5:11
4.	"Three Times a Lady"	Lionel Richie	6:37

Side two
No.	Title	Writer(s)	Length
1.	"Such a Woman"	Walter Orange	4:40
2.	"Say Yeah"	Lionel Richie, Ronald LaPread	5:44
3.	"I Like What You Do"	Lionel Richie, Walter Orange	4:49
4.	"Visions"	Lionel Richie, Thomas McClary	5:43
Total length:			41:41

== Personnel ==
=== Commodores ===
- Lionel Richie – vocals, saxophones, keyboards
- Milan Williams – keyboards, vocals
- Thomas McClary – lead guitar, vocals
- Ronald LaPread – bass, vocals
- Walter Orange – vocals, drums, percussion
- William King – vocals, percussion, trumpet

=== Additional musicians ===
- Cal Harris – synthesizer programming
- James Anthony Carmichael – horn and string arrangements

The Mean Machine

- Darrell Jones – rhythm guitar
- Eddie "Bongo" Brown – percussion
- David Cochrane – saxophones
- Winston Sims – saxophones
- Harold Hudson – trumpet

== Production ==
- Commodores – producers, arrangerments
- James Anthony Carmichael – producer, arrangerments
- Cal Harris – engineer, mixing
- Jane Clark – engineer
- Tony Jones – album coordinator
- Norm Ung – art direction, design
- David McMacken illustration
- Jim Shea – photography
- Suzee Ikeda – project manager
- James Tarver – road manager

== Charts ==
Chart performance for Natural High
Chart (1978)	Peak position
Australia	14
Netherlands	5
New Zealand	5
Norway	19
US Pop	3
US R&B	1

== Certifications ==
Certifications for Natural High
Region	Certification	Certified units/sales
Netherlands (NVPI)	Gold	50,000^{^}
New Zealand (RMNZ)	Gold	7,500^{^}
United Kingdom (BPI)	Gold	100,000^{^}
United States (RIAA)	Platinum	1,000,000^{^}
^{^} Shipments figures based on certification alone.

== See also ==
- List of number-one R&B albums of 1978 (U.S.)
