= The Very Best of The Commodores =

The Very Best of The Commodores may refer to:

- The Very Best of The Commodores (1985 album)
- The Very Best of The Commodores (1995 album)
