= Only You (Commodores song) =

Single by Commodores

from the album Commodores 13
- B-side: "Cebu"
- Released: 1983
- Genre: R&B
- Length: 4:10
- Label: Motown
- Songwriter: Milan Williams
- Producer: Milan Williams

Commodores singles chronology
"Reach High" (1983)	"Only You" (1983)	"Turn Off The Lights" (1984)

"Only You" is a song by R&B band Commodores from their tenth studio album, Commodores 13. It was released as a single in 1983 by Motown Records and peaked at No. 8 on the US Billboard Adult Contemporary chart. The single also reached No. 20 on the US Billboard Hot R&B Singles chart.

This was the first single after Lionel Richie left the band the previous year. Radio programmers apparently felt this love song (written by bandmember Milan Williams) was an attempt to imitate the ballad hit records that Richie had with the group prior. Therefore it received little airplay and promotion from Motown as the company experimented to see if the group was still marketable without Richie. The Commodores would in fact have only one more major hit single and album before leaving for another label.

== Charts ==
Chart (1983)	Peak position
US Billboard Hot 100	54
US Hot R&B Singles (Billboard)	20
US Adult Contemporary (Billboard))	8
UK Top Pop Singles (OCC)	93
