= No Tricks =

Studio album by Commodores
- Released: March 29, 1993
- Recorded: 1993
- Studios: Ameraycan Studios (North Hollywood, California); Entercore Studios and Satellite Tracking (Minneapolis, Minnesota); Sound Sensor Studios
- Genre: R&B
- Length: 42:40
- Label: Commodores
- Producers: Commodores; Wayne Arnold; Marshall Charloff; Chuck Cymone; Thomas Dawson; John Fields; Jimmy George; Willie Hutch; Lou Pardini; Sheldon Reynolds; Howie Rice

Commodores chronology
| Commodores Christmas (1992) | No Tricks (1993) | The Very Best of The Commodores (1995) |

Singles from Commodores
- 1. "Everything Reminds Me Of You" Released: 1993; 2. "Brick House '93" Released: 1994

Professional ratings
Review scores
| Source | Rating |
|---|---|
| AllMusic | 2.5/5 stars |

No Tricks is the fourteenth studio album by the Commodores, released on March 29, 1993. At this point, the band had been reduced to the trio of Walter "Clyde" Orange, William King and J.D. Nicholas. The album did not chart.

== Singles ==
"Everything Reminds Me of You" reached No. 9 on the Japanese Oricon Singles Chart.

== Track listing ==
Track listing for No Tricks
| Tracks | Title | Composer | Time |
|---|---|---|---|
| 1 | "No Tricks" | J.D. Nicholas, Howie Rice | 5:02 |
| 2 | "Shut Up and Dance" | Thomas Dawson, Shirley King, William King | 4:18 |
| 3 | "Brick House '93" | William King, Ronald LaPread, Thomas McClary, Walter Orange, Lionel Richie, Milan Williams | 4:13 |
| 4 | "Living on the Edge" | Betty Reynolds, Sheldon Reynolds | 4:16 |
| 5 | "Let's Get Busy" | Willie Hutch, J.D. Nicholas, Tyron Stanton | 3:40 |
| 6 | "Everything Reminds Me of You" | Jimmy George, Lou Pardini | 4:28 |
| 7 | "Missing You" | Chuck Cymone, J.D. Nicholas, Sheldon Reynolds | 4:01 |
| 8 | "Lady, Don't Rock It" | Marshall Charloff, John Fields, J.D. Nicholas | 3:55 |
| 9 | "Your Smile" | Wayne Arnold, Walter Orange | 4:17 |
| 10 | "Take My Hand" | Sheila Jordan, Walter Orange | 4:24 |
