= Movin' On (Commodores album) =

Studio album by The Commodores
- Released: October 1975
- Recorded: 1975
- Genres: Soul, funk
- Length: 36:04
- Label: Motown
- Producers: James Anthony Carmichael; Commodores

The Commodores chronology
| Caught in the Act (1975) | Movin' On (1975) | Hot on the Tracks (1976) |

Singles from Movin' On
- 1. "Gimme My Mule" Released: 1975; 2. "Sweet Love" Released: 1975

Movin' On is the third studio album by the Commodores, released by Motown Records in 1975.

== Reception ==
Professional ratings
Review scores
| Source | Rating |
|---|---|
| Christgau's Record Guide | B− |

The album reached number 29 on the Billboard 200 albums chart and number seven on the R&B albums chart. The only single released from the album, "Sweet Love", a mid-tempo ballad about "the virtues of peace and harmony during troubled times," reached number five on the Billboard Hot 100 chart in 1976, making it the group's first top ten hit on the chart. However, the last track, "Cebu", became a staple on the "Quiet Storm" radio stations, and appeared as a B-side to two of their later singles, "Fancy Dancer" (1976) and "Only You" (1983).

Allmusic rated the album four and a half out of five stars.

The cover artwork of the 2012 Van Halen album A Different Kind of Truth drew comparisons to that of Movin' On.

== Track listing ==
Side one
| No. | Title | Writer(s) | Length |
|---|---|---|---|
| 1. | "Hold On" | Thomas McClary, Lionel Richie | 4:16 |
| 2. | "Free" | McClary, Richie | 3:54 |
| 3. | "Mary, Mary" | Milan Williams | 4:08 |
| 4. | "Sweet Love" | Richie | 6:31 |

Side two
| No. | Title | Writer(s) | Length |
|---|---|---|---|
| 1. | "(Can I) Get a Witness" | Walter "Clyde" Orange | 5:01 |
| 2. | "Gimme My Mule" | Ronald LaPread | 5:05 |
| 3. | "Time" | William King, McClary | 3:21 |
| 4. | "Cebu" (instrumental) | McClary | 4:48 |
| Total length: | | | 36:04 |

== Personnel ==
Commodores

- Lionel Richie – vocals, saxophones, keyboards
- Milan Williams – keyboards
- Thomas McClary – vocals, guitars
- Ronald LaPread – bass
- Walter Orange – vocals, drums, percussion
- William King – trumpet

Additional personnel

- Cal Harris – ARP synthesizer programming

== Production ==
- Commodores – producers, arrangements
- James Anthony Carmichael – producer, arrangements
- Cal Harris – engineer, mixing, technical direction
- Frank Mulvey – art direction, design
- Peter Palombi – cover illustration
- Antonin Kratochvil – liner photography
- Benjamin Ashburn – album coordinator, management

== Charts ==
| Year | Chart positions | | |
| Year | US | US R&B | Aus |
|---|---|---|---|
| 1975 | 29 | 7 | 80 |

=== Singles ===
| Year | Single | Chart positions | | |
| Year | Single | US | US R&B | US Dance |
|---|---|---|---|---|
| 1976 | "Sweet Love" | 5 | 2 | — |
