= Rock Solid =

Studio album by Commodores
- Released: 1988
- Recorded: 1987
- Studios: Ameraycan Studios and The Lighthouse (North Hollywood, California); Foot On The Hill Studio, Lion Share Studios and Record Plant (Los Angeles, California); Yamaha R&D Studios (Glendale, California); Paragon Studios (Chicago, Illinois); Hillside Sound Studios (Englewood, New Jersey); Soundtrack Studios and Quad Recording Studios (New York City, New York)
- Genre: R&B
- Length: 53:23
- Label: Polydor
- Producers: Steve Harvey; Walter Orange; Tony Prendatt; William King; Sandy Torano; Michael Omartian; Howie Rice; J.D. Nicholas; Howard Hewett; David "Hawk" Wolinski; Milan Williams

Commodores chronology
United (1986)	Rock Solid (1988)	Commodores Christmas (1992)

Professional ratings
Review scores
Source	Rating
AllMusic	2/5 stars

Rock Solid is the thirteenth studio album by the Commodores, released in 1988. At this time in the band's career, hits were no longer forthcoming, and this album failed to enter the Billboard albums chart. The single, "Solitaire", reached No. 51 on the R&B chart. It is the last of the band's albums with keyboard player and founding member Milan Williams, who was fired after a dispute about playing in South Africa.

== Track listing ==
Tracks	Title	Composer	Length
1	"Grrip"	Jenine Elcock, Walter Orange	5:30
2	"Bump the La La"	Orange	4:40
3	"Thank You"	Harold Hudson, William A. King, Shirley King	5:50
4	"I'm Gonna Need Your Loving"	Pamela Oland, Orange	5:45
5	"Solitaire"	Chris Cameron, Sandy Torano	4:44
6	"Homeless"	Randy Goodrum, David Malloy, Marti Sharron	4:40
7	"Miracle Man"	J.D. Nicholas, Douglas Smith	4:39
8	"Right Here 'N Now"	Susan Pomerantz, Wardell Potts, Gerry Stober	4:03
9	"Stretchhh"	Nicholas, Sheldon Reynolds	3:48
10	"Ain't Givin' Up"	Paula Smith, Tyron Stanton, Milan Williams	5:03
11	"So Nice"	Anthony Malloy, Alan Rich	4:20

== Personnel ==
Adapted from AllMusic.

Commodores

- William King – keyboards, guitars, trumpet, backing vocals (1, 9, 10)
- J.D. Nicholas – keyboards, backing vocals (1, 5–11), lead vocals (3, 6–10)
- Milan Williams – keyboards, guitars, backing vocals (1, 10),
- Walter Orange – keyboards, drums, lead vocals (1, 2, 4–6, 11), backing vocals (1, 2, 6, 9, 10), electronic programming (2, 4), additional vocals (10)

Additional musicians

- Steve Harvey – electronic programming (1, 2, 4), additional keyboards (1, 4), backing vocals (4)
- Jeff Lorber – additional keyboards (1, 4), grand piano (2)
- John Gilutin – acoustic piano (3)
- Tony Prendatt – keyboards (3), additional keyboards (11)
- Chris Cameron – keyboards (5), programming (5)
- Michael Omartian – keyboards (6), drums (6)
- Kevin Mahoney – Synclavier (6)
- Erich Bulling – electronic programming (6)
- Stewart Hanley – keyboards (7)
- Ramsey Embick – electronic programming (7, 9)
- Monty Seward – additional keyboards (8), electronic programming (8)
- George Duke – Synclavier strings (8)
- Harold Hudson – keyboards (10)
- Rick Emerson – additional keyboards (11)
- Paul Jackson, Jr. – guitars (1, 3, 4)
- Ray Fuller – guitars (2, 8)
- Michael Landau – guitars (3, 6)
- Sandy Torano – guitars (5), backing vocals (5)
- Sheldon Reynolds – guitars (7, 9), backing vocals (7)
- Dave Battelene – guitars (10)
- Dann Huff – guitars (11)
- Freddie "Ready Freddie" Washington – bass (3, 11)
- Tyron Stanton – bass (10)
- John "J.R." Robinson – drums (3)
- Vinnie Colaiuta – drums (5)
- Isaac Morris – drums (10)
- Ed Greene – additional drums (11)
- Paulinho da Costa – percussion (2, 3)
- Ruben Alvarez – percussion (5)
- David Rosenberg – additional percussion (5)
- Alejo Poveda – additional percussion (5)
- David Cochrane – soprano sax solo (3)
- Steve Eisen – tenor saxophone (5)
- Larry Williams – saxophone (6)
- Gerald Albright – saxophone solo (11)
- Karyn White – backing vocals (1, 2, 4, 11), additional backing vocals (10)
- Marva Hicks – backing vocals (2)
- Shirley King – Spanish translation (2)
- Portia Griffith – backing vocals (4)
- Jeff Lorenzen – backing vocals (4)
- Shawn Christopher – backing vocals (5)
- Carl Caldwell – backing vocals (6, 8)
- Lynn Davis – backing vocals (6)
- Josie James – backing vocals (6, 8)
- Mia Tabares – backing vocals (8, 9)
- Randy Hall – backing vocals (9), additional backing vocals (10)
- Alfie Silas – backing vocals (9)
- Sherri Wells – backing vocals (9)
- Donna Davidson – backing vocals (11)

Music arrangements

- Steve Harvey – vocal arrangements (1, 4), arrangements (2)
- Walter Orange – vocal arrangements (1, 4), arrangements (2)
- Gene Page – arrangements (3)
- Chris Cameron – arrangements (5)
- Sandy Torano – arrangements (5)
- J.D. Nicholas – vocal arrangements (7–9)
- Howard Hewett – vocal arrangements (8)

=== Production ===
- Steve Harvey – producer (1, 2, 4)
- Walter Orange – producer (1, 2, 4, 11)
- William King – producer (3, 5, 11)
- Tony Prendatt – producer (3, 11), executive producer (5)
- Sandy Torano – producer (5)
- Michael Omartian – producer (6)
- Marti Sharron – associate producer (6)
- Howie Rice – producer (7, 9)
- J.D. Nicholas – associate producer (7), producer (8, 9)
- Howard Hewett – producer (8)
- Milan Williams – producer (10)
- Hawk Wolinski – producer (10)
- Tom Nikosey – art direction
- Ron Slenzak – photography
- Ian Carter – stylist
- Marietta Carter – make-up
- Toni Greene – hair
- Don Shear – hair
- Jo-Ann Geffen & Associates – management

Technical credits

- Jeff Lorenzen – engineer (1, 2, 4),
- Alan Meyerson – engineer (1–4, 11), mixing (1–5, 7–9)
- William King – mixing (3)
- George Warner – engineer (5)
- Terry Christian – engineer (6)
- Stewart Hanley – engineer (7, 9)
- Norman Whitfield Jr. – engineer (7, 9)
- Cliff Jones – engineer (8)
- Howard Hewett – mixing (8)
- J.D. Nicholas – mixing (9)
- Ray Blair – engineer (10)
- John Van Nest – engineer (11)
- Tony Volante – engineer (11), mixing (11)
- Mark Harman – assistant engineer (2)
- Micajah Ryan – assistant engineer (3, 10, 11)
- Elliott Peters – assistant engineer (5)
- Mark Partis – mix assistant (5), assistant engineer (11)
