= Hot on the Tracks =

Studio album by Commodores
- Released: June 1976
- Recorded: 1976
- Studio: Motown Recording Studios (Hollywood, California)
- Genres: R&B, soul, funk
- Length: 38:25
- Label: Motown
- Producers: James Anthony Carmichael; Commodores

Commodores chronology
Movin' On (1975)	Hot on the Tracks (1976)	Commodores (1977)

Singles from Hot on the Tracks
- 1. "Just to Be Close to You" Released: August 1976; 2. "Fancy Dancer" Released: 1976

Professional ratings
Review scores
Source	Rating
AllMusic	4.5/5 stars

Hot on the Tracks is the fourth studio album by the Commodores, released by Motown Records in 1976. It includes the top ten pop single "Just to Be Close to You". The album was the band's first number-one entry on the R&B chart.

== Track listing ==
Side one

1. "Let's Get Started" – (Lionel Richie, Milan Williams, Walter Orange, Ronald La Pread, Thomas McClary, William King) – 3:55
2. "Girl, I Think the World About You" – (Richie, McClary) – 4:33
3. "High on Sunshine" – (Richie, McClary) – 4:25
4. "Just to Be Close to You" – (Richie) – 6:23

Side two

1. "Fancy Dancer" (Richie, La Pread) – 3:51
2. "Come Inside" (Richie, McClary) – 4:26
3. "Thumpin' Music" (King) – 3:26
4. "Captain Quickdraw" (Williams) – 4:20
5. "Can't Let You Tease Me" (Orange) – 3:18

== Personnel ==
Commodores

- Lionel Richie – vocals, saxophones, keyboards
- Milan Williams – keyboards
- Thomas McClary – vocals, guitars
- Ronald LaPread – bass
- Walter Orange – drums, vocals, percussion
- William King – trumpet

Additional personnel

- Cal Harris – synthesizers

== Production ==
- Benjamin Ashburn – executive producer, management
- Commodores – producers, arrangements
- James Anthony Carmichael – producer, arrangements
- Cal Harris – recording, mixing
- Jane Clark – assistant engineer
- Jack Andrews – mastering
- Suzee Ikeda – project manager
- Frank Mulvey – art direction, design
- Michael Steirnagle – illustration

== Charts ==
Year	Chart positions		
Year	US	US R&B	AUS
1976	12	1	93

=== Singles ===
Year	Single	Chart positions		
Year	Single	US	US R&B	US Dance
1976	"Just to Be Close to You"	7	1	—
1977	"Fancy Dancer"	39	9	33

== See also ==
- List of number-one R&B albums of 1976 (U.S.)
