= Commodores Christmas =

Studio album by Commodores
- Released: 1992
- Recorded: 1992
- Studios: The Studio (San Diego, California)
- Genres: Christmas; R&B
- Length: 38:55
- Label: Commodores
- Producers: Steve Vaus; J.D. Nicholas; William King

Commodores chronology
Rock Solid (1988)	Commodores Christmas (1992)	No Tricks (1993)

Professional ratings
Review scores
Source	Rating
Allmusic	2/5 stars

Commodores Christmas is a Christmas album released by The Commodores in 1992.

== Track listing ==
Tracks	Title	Composer	Time
1	"When the Stars Come Out for Christmas"	Karla Bonoff, Steve Vaus, Carrie Weiland	3:17
2	"Hark! The Herald Angels Sing"	Mendelssohn, Wesley	2:21
3	"Christmas Time Is Here"	J.D. Nicholas, Sheldon Reynolds	4:18
4	"The First Noel"	Traditional arr Steve Vaus	3:16
5	"Merry Christmas, O Happy Day"	Shirley King, William King	3:39
6	"O Come All Ye Faithful"	Traditional arr Steve Vaus	3:08
7	"The Christmas Song"	Torme, Wells	3:42
8	"Deck the Halls"	Traditional arr Steve Vaus	2:06
9	"Do You Hear What I Hear?"	Traditional arr Steve Vaus	3:41
10	"Sleigh Ride Together With You"	Traditional arr Steve Vaus	2:20
11	"Angels We Have Heard on High"	Traditional arr Steve Vaus	3:14
12	"Jerry the Elf"	Shirley King, William King	3:53

== Personnel ==
Commodores

- William King – backing vocals, vocal arrangements (1, 2, 4, 8)
- J.D. Nicholas – lead vocals (1, 3, 5, 7-11), backing vocals, vocal arrangements (1-5, 7-11), musical arrangements (3)
- Walter Orange – lead vocals (1, 2, 4, 6, 8, 9, 11, 12), backing vocals, vocal arrangements (1, 2, 4, 5, 8, 9, 11, 12)

Additional personnel

- Craig Bartock – programming
- Wayne Nelson – bass (1)
- Steve Vaus – musical arrangements (1, 5, 7, 9, 11, 12), vocal arrangements (1, 2, 4-11), traditional arrangements (2, 4, 6, 8-11)
- Carrie Weiland – vocal arrangements (1)
- Sheldon Reynolds – musical and vocal arrangements (3)

=== Production ===
- Steve Vaus – executive producer, producer
- J.D. Nicholas – producer (3)
- William King – producer (5, 12)
- Mike Harris – engineer
- Maria Henderson – album coordinator
- Keith Luecke – album coordinator
- Wendy Johnson – art direction, design
- Janell Twite – art direction, design
- Tom Nikosey – logo design
- David L. Fish – management, direction
