= Commodores (album) =

Studio album by Commodores
- Released: March 30, 1977
- Recorded: 1976–1977
- Studios: Motown Recording Studios (Hollywood, California)
- Genres: Soul; funk
- Length: 38:22
- Label: Motown
- Producers: James Anthony Carmichael; Commodores

Commodores chronology
Hot on the Tracks (1976)	Commodores (1977)	Commodores Live! (1977)

Singles from Commodores
- 1. "Easy" Released: March 18, 1977; 2. "Brick House" Released: August 26, 1977; 3. "Zoom" Released: 1978 (UK)

Professional ratings
Review scores
Source	Rating
AllMusic	4/5 stars
MusicHound Rock: The Essential Album Guide	3/5 stars

Commodores is the fifth studio album by the Commodores, released in 1977. The album spent eight weeks at the top of the R&B/soul albums chart, the second of their albums to do so, and was their first Top 5 pop album. There is also a previously released extended version. The original vinyl release included a large fold out poster of the band. The poster is visible in a scene of the 1977 movie Saturday Night Fever.

The band employed a variety of musical styles for the album, highlighted by the popular anthem "Brick House". With Walter Orange's deep voice on the lead, and Ronald LaPread's bassline, this track peaked on the U.S. Hot 100 at #5, and the U.S. R&B Chart at #4. "Brick House" means a "stacked" woman with an hour-glass figure.

In contrast to "Brick House", "Easy" is a pop ballad with mellow vocals by Lionel Richie.

"Zoom" is one of the Commodores' best known tunes, despite not being released as a single in the US. It reached #38 on the UK singles chart. Fergie sampled "Zoom" in her song "All That I Got (The Make-Up Song)" on the album The Dutchess.

In the UK and other Western European countries this album was released as Zoom on Tamla Motown.

The album was dedicated to Kathy Faye LaPread, bass guitarist Ronald LaPread's wife, who died from cancer around that time.

== Track listing ==
Side one
No.	Title	Writer(s)	Extended length	Length
1.	"Squeeze the Fruit"	Walter Orange	3:03	3:00
2.	"Funny Feelings"	Lionel Richie; Thomas McClary	5:57	4:51
3.	"Heaven Knows"	Richie; McClary	6:16	4:41
4.	"Zoom"	Richie; Ronald LaPread	7:06	6:43

Side two
No.	Title	Writer(s)	Extended length	Length
1.	"Won't You Come Dance with Me"	Richie; McClary	4:08	3:47
2.	"Brick House"	Shirley Hanna-King [uncredited]; Richie; Milan Williams; Orange; LaPread; McClary; William King	3:46	3:27
3.	"Funky Situation"	King	4:12	3:39
4.	"Patch It Up"	Williams	4:03	3:58
5.	"Easy"	Richie	4:50	4:16

== Personnel ==
Commodores

- Lionel Richie – vocals, saxophones, keyboards
- Milan Williams – keyboards
- Thomas McClary – vocals, lead guitar
- Ronald LaPread – vocals, bass
- Walter Orange – vocals, drums, percussion
- William King – vocals, percussion, trumpet

Additional musicians

- Cal Harris – synthesizers
- Darrell Jones – rhythm guitar

== Production ==
- Commodores – producers, arrangements
- James Anthony Carmichael – producer, arrangements
- Cal Harris – engineer, mixing
- Jane Clark – engineer
- Jack Andrews – mastering
- Carl Overr – graphics director
- Stan Martin – design
- Tom Nikosey – illustration
- Gene Gurley – photography
- Benjamin Ashburn – album coordinator, manager

== Charts ==
Year	Chart positions		
Year	US	US R&B	Aus
1977	3	1	62

=== Singles ===
Year	Single	Chart positions		
Year	Single	US	US R&B	US Dance
1977	"Brick House"	5	4	34
1977	"Easy"	4	1	—

== See also ==
- List of number-one R&B albums of 1977 (U.S.)
