= Too Hot ta Trot =

Single by The Commodores

from the album Commodores Live!
- B-side: "Funky Situation"
- Released: November 17, 1977
- Genre: Funk
- Length: 3:30
- Label: Motown
- Songwriters: Lionel Richie, Milan Williams, Ronald LaPread, Thomas McClary, Walter "Clyde" Orange, William King
- Producer: James Carmichael

The Commodores singles chronology
"Brick House" (1977)	"Too Hot ta Trot" (1977)	"Three Times a Lady" (1978)

"Too Hot ta Trot" is a song by R&B/funk band, the Commodores. The song is written in E major.

The track on their 1977 live album Commodores Live!, and it spent a week at number one on the R&B singles chart and peaked at number twenty-four on the Billboard Hot 100 in early 1978.

Record World called it a "thumping funk exercise from a live lp."

== Personnel ==
- William "WAK" King – trumpet, rhythm guitar, synthesizer, vocals
- Walter Orange – vocals, drums, keyboards
- Milan Williams – keyboards, trombone, rhythm guitar
- Thomas McClary – lead guitar
- Lionel Richie – vocals, saxophone, piano, drums
- Ronald LaPread – bass guitar, trumpet

== Chart performance ==
Chart (1977–1978)	Peak position
UK Singles (The Official Charts Company)	38
US Billboard Hot 100	24
US Hot Soul Singles (Billboard)	1

== Use in film ==
- The song was featured on the soundtrack for (and performed in) the movie, Thank God It's Friday.
