= Machine Gun (Commodores album) =

1974 studio album by Commodores

Studio album by Commodores
- Released: July 22, 1974
- Recorded: 1972–74
- Studio: Motown Recording Studios Hollywood, California
- Genres: Funk, R&B, instrumental
- Length: 36:06
- Label: Motown
- Producers: James Anthony Carmichael; Commodores; Jeffrey Bowen; George Tobin; Gloria Jones; Pam Sawyer; Clayton Ivey; Terry Woodford

Commodores chronology
Machine Gun (1974)	Caught in the Act (1975)

Professional ratings
Review scores
Source	Rating
AllMusic	3.5/5 stars
Christgau's Record Guide	B+

Machine Gun is the debut studio album by Commodores, released on July 22, 1974, on Motown Records.

== Critical reception ==
Alex Henderson of AllMusic in a 3.5/5-star review remarked, "What you won't find on Machine Gun are a lot of sentimental love ballads. In the late '70s, the Commodores became as famous for their ballads as they were for their funk and dance material, but believe it or not, there are no ballads to be found on this consistently funky, mostly up-tempo debut."

With a B+ Robert Christgau of the Village Voice declared "The first side is good straight hard funk, kicked off by a title instrumental that's the best thing on the record--sure sign of a good straight hard funk band. The second side is acceptable straight hard funk, with some social consciousness thrown in by corporate stablemates Pam Sawyer and Gloria Jones."

== Singles ==
The title track peaked at number 7 on the US Billboard R&B singles chart, while reaching number 22 on the Billboard Hot 100, becoming the band's first hit. It also reached No. 20 on both the UK Singles chart and the Canadian RPM pop singles chart.

The second single to be released, "I Feel Sanctified", reached number 12 on the US R&B chart, and concerns a man spiritually blessed by his girlfriend's love. The song has Ronald LaPread on bass guitar, Walter "Clyde" Orange on drums, while Lionel Richie and William King contributed horn arrangements. The tune has an a cappella introduction with three-way harmonization. Record World said of it "Bangin' out with a Salvation Army drum beat gone funk, the [Commodores] aim for a vocal bullseye." The song has been called a "prototype" for Wild Cherry's 1976 hit "Play That Funky Music". "I Feel Sanctified" was also later covered by that same group.

"The Human Zoo" was a staple on the Northern soul scene at Blackpool Mecca and Wigan Casino with dancers back flipping spinning and hand clapping to the beat.

The drum break in the track "The Assembly Line" has been sampled many times, mainly used in hip-hop, drum and bass, and jungle music.

== Track listing ==
Side one
No.	Title	Writer(s)	Length
1.	"Machine Gun" (instrumental)	Milan Williams	2:43
2.	"Young Girls Are My Weakness"	William King, Ronald LaPread	2:42
3.	"I Feel Sanctified"	Lionel Richie, Jeffrey Bowen, Ronald LaPread, Walter Orange, Milan Williams, Thomas McClary	3:30
4.	"The Bump"	Milan Williams	4:11
5.	"Rapid Fire" (instrumental)	Milan Williams	3:08

Side two
No.	Title	Writer(s)	Length
1.	"The Assembly Line"	Gloria Jones, Pam Sawyer	5:10
2.	"The Zoo (The Human Zoo)"	Gloria Jones, Pam Sawyer	3:16
3.	"Gonna Blow Your Mind"	Thomas McClary, Walter Orange, Milan Williams	6:09
4.	"There's a Song in My Heart"	Lionel Richie	2:38
5.	"Superman"	Lionel Richie	2:39
Total length:			36:06

== Personnel ==
Commodores

- Lionel Richie – vocals, saxophones, keyboards
- Milan Williams – keyboards, guitars
- Thomas McClary – vocals, guitars
- Ronald LaPread – bass
- Walter Orange – drums, vocals, percussion
- William King – trumpet, percussion

== Production ==
- James Anthony Carmichael – producer (1, 2, 4, 5, 8, 10), arrangements (1–5, 8, 10), horn arrangements (3)
- Commodores – producers (1, 2, 4, 5, 8, 10), arrangements (1, 2, 4–8, 10)
- Jeffrey Bowen – producer (3)
- George Tobin – producer (3), arrangements (3)
- Gloria Jones – producer (6, 7), arrangements (6, 7)
- Pam Sawyer – producer (6, 7)
- Clayton Ivey – producer (9), arrangements (9)
- Terry Woodford – producer (9), arrangements (9)
- Cal Harris – effects
- Jim Britt – photography

== Charts ==
Chart (1974)	Peak position
Australia (Kent Music Report)	37
New Zealand (RIANZ)	27
US Top LPs (Billboard)	138
US Top Soul LPs (Billboard)	22

== Certifications ==
Region	Certification	Certified units/sales
Australia (ARIA)	Gold	20,000^{^}
^{^} Shipments figures based on certification alone.
