= Sweet Love (Commodores song) =

Single by Commodores

from the album Movin' On
- B-side: "Better Never Than Forever"
- Released: 25 November 1975 (US)
- Recorded: 1975
- Genre: Soul; R&B; pop
- Length: 3:20
- Label: Motown
- Composer(s): Lionel Richie
- Producer(s): James Anthony Carmichael, Commodores

Commodores singles chronology
"This Is Your Life" (1975)	"Sweet Love" (1975)	"Just to Be Close to You" (1976)

"Sweet Love" is a soul/R&B ballad written by Lionel Richie and recorded by American R&B vocal group Commodores.

It became their first Top 10 pop hit in the US, where the single peaked at number five on the Billboard Hot 100 and number two on the Billboard Hot Soul Singles chart in 1976, while in the UK, it reached number 32, becoming their second Top 40 hit.

== Background ==
"Sweet Love " was a ballad that heralded a move away from their initial stone cold funk sound. The six-minute album version is noted for Richie's half-sung, half-spoken recitation before the song's refrain repeats to the fade out.

== Reception ==
Cash Box said that it has "close, colorful, harmonious vocal lines and smooth, flowing musical arrangement."

== Chart performance ==
Chart (1976)	Peak position
UK Singles (The Official Charts Company)	32
US Billboard Hot 100	5
US Hot Soul Singles (Billboard)	2
