= Slippery When Wet (Commodores song) =

Single by Commodores

from the album Caught in the Act
- B-side: "The Bump"
- Released: 2 April 1975 (US)
- Genre: R&B; funk
- Length: 2:58 (single edit)
- Label: Motown
- Songwriter(s): Thomas McClary
- Producer(s): Commodores, James Anthony Carmichael

Commodores singles chronology
| "I Feel Sanctified" (1974) | "Slippery When Wet" (1975) | "Just to Be Close to You" (1976) |

"Slippery When Wet" is a 1975 single by American band the Commodores. The song was written by lead guitarist, Thomas McClary. The track is from their second album Caught in the Act.

== Chart performance ==
It was the group's first single to reach number one on the soul singles chart in the US and was their second top 40 pop single, peaked at number nineteen on the Billboard Hot 100.

== Charts ==
| Chart (1975) | Peak position |
|---|---|
| US Billboard Hot 100 | 19 |
| US Billboard Hot Soul Singles | 1 |

== Cover versions ==
- The Sons of Champlin recorded the song in 1976 for their album A Circle Filled With Love (Ariola) as "Slippery When It's Wet".

== Samples ==
The Limbomaniacs sampled the song heavily in their song "Shake It" (1990) https://www.youtube.com/watch?v=IedAaxFEF8Y
