= Oh No (Commodores song) =

Single by Commodores

from the album In the Pocket
- B-side: "Lovin' You"
- Released: September 1981
- Genre: Pop, R&B
- Length: 3:04
- Label: Motown
- Songwriter: Lionel Richie
- Producers: James Anthony Carmichael, Commodores

Commodores singles chronology
"Lady (You Bring Me Up)" (1981)	"Oh No" (1981)	"Why You Wanna Try Me" (1982)

"Oh No" is an R&B ballad from the 1981 Commodores album In the Pocket. Written by Lionel Richie, the song was released as a single in September 1981, it became his final hit with the Commodores before pursuing a solo career.

Similarities of the song's opening bars can be heard in Richie's 1981 duet "Endless Love" with Diana Ross.

Record World praised "the combination of delicate piano melodies and Lionel Richie Jr.'s emotional lead vocal."

This song was also featured in the 1982 movie The Last American Virgin.

== Track listings ==
7" single

1. "Oh No" – 3:00
2. "Lovin' You" – 4:36

== Charts ==
Chart (1981)	Peak position
Australia (Kent Music Report)	51
Canada (RPM)	3
UK Singles (Official Charts)	44
US Billboard Hot 100	4
US Hot Black Singles	5
US Billboard Adult Contemporary	5

Year-end chart (1982)	Rank
US Top Pop Singles (Billboard)	69
