= Lady (You Bring Me Up) =

- Artwork for UK vinyl single

Single by Commodores

from the album In the Pocket
- B-side: "Gettin' It"
- Released: June 1981
- Recorded: 1980
- Genre: R&B, soul, disco
- Length: 4:46 (album/single); 4:04 (short single)
- Label: Motown
- Songwriters: Harold Hudson; William King; Shirley Hanna-King
- Producers: James Anthony Carmichael; Commodores

Commodores singles chronology
"Jesus Is Love" (1980)	"Lady (You Bring Me Up)" (1981)	"Oh No" (1981)

"Lady (You Bring Me Up)" is a 1981 hit single by the Commodores. In the United States, it peaked at No. 8 on the Billboard Hot 100 and No. 5 on the Billboard R&B singles chart. It reached No. 56 on the UK Singles Chart.

It was written by Commodores member William King, his wife, Shirley, and Harold Hudson, a member of the Commodores' backing group, The Mean Machine. Lionel Richie sang lead vocals, and it was one of the group's last big hits before he left for a solo career.

Record World noted that Richie's vocal is backed by "shimmering strings and a driving rhythm."

The music video features the band members playing a six-a-side soccer match with a group of women players.

== Accolades ==
"Lady (You Bring Me Up)" was Grammy-nominated in the category of Best R&B Performance by a Duo or Group with Vocals.

== Track listings ==
7" single

1. "Lady (You Bring Me Up)" – 4:46
2. "Gettin' It" – 4:18

12" single

1. "Lady (You Bring Me Up)" - 5:23

== Charts ==
=== Weekly charts ===
Chart (1981)	Peak position
Australia (Kent Music Report)	34
Belgium (Ultratop 50 Flanders)	17
Canada (RPM Top Singles)	27
Canada (RPM Adult Contemporary)	3
Germany (GfK)	64
Netherlands (Dutch Top 40)	20
Netherlands (Single Top 100)	15
New Zealand (Recorded Music NZ)	1
UK Singles (Official Charts)	56
US Billboard Hot 100	8
US Hot Black Singles (Billboard)	5
US Adult Contemporary (Billboard)	13

=== Year-end charts ===
Chart (1981)	Rank
New Zealand	15
US Top Pop Singles (Billboard)	39
