= Suzee Ikeda =

American singer (born 1947)

- Born: Susan Wendy Ikeda; August 25, 1947 (age 78)
- Origin: Chicago, Illinois, US
- Genres: pop, disco
- Occupations: singer, producer
- Instrument: vocals
- Years active: 1970's–1980's
- Labels: Motown

Suzee Ikeda is an American singer who was the first Asian-American solo artist at Motown. However, she is best known for her work "behind the scenes" at Motown with such acts as Michael Jackson and The Temptations.

== Biography ==
Born Susan Wendy Ikeda on August 25, 1947, in Chicago, Illinois, the daughter of a Japanese father and an American mother.

Initially assigned to Mowest, Motown's subsidiary label, her first single was a cover version of "Zip-A-Dee-Doo-Dah" from the 1946 Disney film, Song of the South. The single failed to chart.

In April 1973, Suzee released her first single on the Motown label, a ballad written by Charles Fox and Norman Gimbel called, "Time For Me to Go." Unfortunately, the single and her solo career went nowhere.

During her tenure at Motown she was described as a "creative confidant" of Michael Jackson. "Michael Jackson could make you forget he was so young," writes Suzee Ikeda, in her introductory essay to Hello World: The Complete Motown Solo Collection.

Ikeda's rapport with artists soon led to a new role behind the scenes as a production executive for the company. One of her early projects was the A Song for You album by The Temptations, released in 1975.

In 1983, Ikeda became one of the principal players in Super Three, a division of Motown responsible for developing new and existing acts. Other participants in the partnership were off again-on again Motown figure Ray Singleton and Guy Costa (nephew of musician and arranger Don Costa), the latter who served as the entity's creative director.

== Selected credits ==
=== Singles ===
==== As a recording artist ====
Release	Single	Cat. #
Oct 1971	"Zip-A-Dee-Doo-Dah" b/w "Bah Bah Bah"	MoWest 5004
Jun 1972	"I Can't Give Back the Love I Feel For You" b/w "Mind, Body & Soul"	MoWest 5016
Apr 1973	"A Time For Me to Go" b/w "Zip-A-Dee-Doo-Dah"	Motown 1237

=== Albums ===
==== Serving in various capacities ====
Release Date	Album	Artist(s) or Group	Capacity(ies)
Oct 1973	Diana & Marvin	Diana Ross & Marvin Gaye	Production Coordination; Production Assistant
Jan 1975	A Song for You	The Temptations	Producer
1980	Jose Feliciano	Jose Feliciano	Producer
1982	Reunion	The Temptations	Producer
Sep 1983	Commodores 13	The Commodores	Project Manager
1986	Dancing on the Ceiling	Lionel Richie	Engineer; Background vocals
