= Brick House (song) =

1977 single by Commodores

- US 12-inch vinyl single

Single by Commodores

from the album Commodores
- B-side: "Captain Quick Draw"
- Released: August 26, 1977
- Recorded: 1977
- Genre: Funk
- Length: 3:37 (single/album version); 6:12 (12" mix)
- Label: Motown
- Songwriters: Lionel Richie, Milan Williams, Walter Orange, Ronald LaPread, Thomas McClary, William King
- Producers: James Anthony Carmichael and the Commodores

Commodores singles chronology
"Easy" (1977)	"Brick House" (1977)	"Too Hot ta Trot" (1978)

"Brick House" is a song from Commodores' 1977 self-titled album (released as Zoom in the UK). The single peaked at number 5 in the U.S. and number 32 in the UK Singles Chart.

== Background ==
Lionel Richie stated that the song's title is a play on the expression "built like a brick shithouse", referring to a strongly built woman. The lyric sung in the chorus is "she's a brick... (pause) house", leaving a deliberate gap implying the vulgar middle word in the pause.

== Charts ==
Chart (1977)	Peak position
Canada Top Singles (RPM)	24
Netherlands (Single Top 100)	15
New Zealand (Recorded Music NZ)	2
UK Singles (Official Charts)	32
US Billboard Hot 100	5
US Hot R&B/Hip-Hop Songs (Billboard)	4

== Certifications ==
Certifications for "Brick House"
Region	Certification	Certified units/sales
New Zealand (RMNZ)	Gold	15,000^{‡}
United States (RIAA)	Gold	500,000^{^}
^{^} Shipments figures based on certification alone.^{‡} Sales+streaming figures based on certification alone.
