= Easy (Commodores song) =

1977 single by the Commodores

- A-side label of 1977 US vinyl single

Single by Commodores

from the album Commodores
- B-side: "Can't Let You Tease Me"
- Released: March 1977
- Genre: Pop-soul; smooth soul
- Length: 4:23 (album version); 3:58 (single version)
- Label: Motown
- Songwriter: Lionel Richie
- Producers: James Anthony Carmichael; Commodores

Commodores singles chronology
"Fancy Dancer" (1977)	"Easy" (1977)	"Brick House" (1977)

Official video
- "Easy" on YouTube

"Easy" is a song by American funk and soul band Commodores from their fifth studio album, Commodores (1977), released on the Motown label. Group member Lionel Richie wrote "Easy" with the intention of it becoming another crossover hit for the group given the success of a previous single, "Just to Be Close to You", which spent two weeks at number one on the US Billboard Hot Soul Singles chart (now known as the Hot R&B/Hip-Hop Songs chart) and peaked at number seven on the Billboard Hot 100 in 1977.

Released in March 1977, "Easy" reached number one on the Billboard Hot Soul Singles chart (for a single week, on July 16) and number four on the Billboard Hot 100. The success of "Easy" paved the way for similar Richie-composed hit ballads such as "Three Times a Lady" and "Still", and also for Richie's later solo hits.

American rock band Faith No More covered the song in 1992 on their album Angel Dust and released it as a single in December of that year. This version became a worldwide hit, reaching number one in Australia and becoming a top-ten hit in eight other countries. On the Billboard Hot 100, it peaked at number 58.

== Content ==
Written by Commodores lead singer Lionel Richie, the song is a slow ballad expressing a man's relief as a relationship ends. Rather than being depressed about the break-up, he states that he is instead "easy like Sunday morning"—something that Richie described as evocative of "small Southern towns that die at 11:30pm" on a Saturday night, such as his hometown Tuskegee, Alabama. The song is written in the key of A♭ major and modulates up a semitone to A major.

In the bridge section, following the opening line: "I wanna be high, so high", there is a distinctive electric guitar glide. An electric guitar solo is heard in the instrumental section of the song.

Richie re-recorded a version of the song for his 2012 studio album Tuskegee which features country singer Willie Nelson.

== Reception ==
Cash Box called it "a bluesy ballad that verifies the Commodores' versatility and professionalism as all-around musicians." Record World said that "the Commodores become the latest r&b outfit to shift gears and offer a ballad – it's one of their best melodies."

== Charts ==
=== Weekly charts ===
Chart (1977–1978)	Peak position
Australia (Kent Music Report)	75
Canada Top Singles (RPM)	12
Canada Adult Contemporary (RPM)	20
Ireland (IRMA)	18
Netherlands (Single Top 100)	24
New Zealand (Recorded Music NZ)	9
UK Singles (Official Charts)	9
US Billboard Hot 100	4
US Adult Contemporary (Billboard)	14
US Hot Soul Singles (Billboard)	1

=== Year-end charts ===
Chart (1977)	Position
Canada Top Singles (RPM)	116
New Zealand (RIANZ)	38
US Billboard Hot 100	33

== Certifications ==
Region	Certification	Certified units/sales
Denmark (IFPI Danmark)	Gold	45,000^{‡}
Italy (FIMI) sales since 2009	Gold	25,000^{‡}
New Zealand (RMNZ)	5× Platinum	150,000^{‡}
United Kingdom (BPI)	Platinum	600,000^{‡}
^{‡} Sales+streaming figures based on certification alone.

== Faith No More version ==
"Easy"
- CD maxi-single variant of North American artwork

Single by Faith No More

from the album Angel Dust
- A-side: "Be Aggressive" (UK and Ireland)
- B-side: "Das Schutzenfest"
- Released: December 29, 1992
- Genre: Soft rock
- Length: 3:08
- Label: Slash; Reprise
- Songwriter: Lionel Richie
- Producers: Matt Wallace; Faith No More

Faith No More singles chronology
"Everything's Ruined" (1992)	"Easy" (1992)	"Another Body Murdered" (1994)

Music video
- "Easy" on YouTube

American rock band Faith No More recorded a cover of "Easy" (renamed "I'm Easy" in Europe) during the studio sessions for Angel Dust, following its repeated performance during live shows. It was released as the final single to the album in late 1992. Faith No More's version of "Easy" closely follows the original version, but omits the second verse of the Commodores recording and features a slightly more aggressive drum sound and guitar solo. Faith No More initially played "Easy" to replace their cover of Black Sabbath's "War Pigs" that was a fixture of their concerts during this era. Faith No More wanted to break from the typical rock band mold and also aimed to spite the heavy metal fans who attended Faith No More's concerts expecting "War Pigs". Bassist Billy Gould said the version was a straightforward cover because "we like ["Easy"] in a painful kind of way. It gives us memories of our childhood". When asked about the cover, Lionel Richie himself replied that "I was actually quite flattered about the song. Yes, I loved it!"

"Easy" was originally issued on December 29, 1992, as a double A-side single with "Be Aggressive". The double A-side peaked at No. 3 on the UK Singles Chart, becoming the band's highest-charting UK hit, and No. 5 on the Irish Singles Chart. "Easy" also reached No. 1 in Australia for two weeks in May 1993 and peaked within the top five on the charts of Belgium, Finland, Iceland, Ireland and Norway. In the United States, the song was Faith No More's last single to appear on the Billboard Hot 100, peaking at No. 58 in April 1993 as well as No. 54 on the Cash Box Top 100. It was later included on the European version of their album Angel Dust.

=== Version differences ===
The song was released under three titles: "I'm Easy", "I'm Easy (Cooler Version)", and "Easy". The title varies depending upon the region of release or whether it was the single or part of the album Angel Dust. As a single, in most countries apart from the United States, Australia and Japan, releases had the title "I'm Easy". In the aforementioned countries, the title was simply "Easy" with the German special edition using "I'm Easy (Cooler Version)". There are at least two different mixes in circulation, all of which originate from the same studio recording of the song.

The first mix has a voice-over by Mike Patton during the first few seconds of the song: "Turn the lights out, baby. This one's for the ladies in the house". It also has fewer guitar overdubs, a slightly different bass line before the guitar solo, and more reverb on the entire track. The second version, sometimes listed as the "Cooler Version" as titled on the German special edition of the single, lacks this voice-over but features a background string-synth arrangement throughout the song as well as the "missing" guitar parts not found in the other mix. This latter version is the one used in the music video for the song.

The first version was included on all London Records releases of the single and Angel Dust apart from the German special edition, while the second version was included on the Slash and Slash/Liberation releases of the single, on Angel Dust and on retrospective compilations release by Slash, London Records, Rhino and Liberation.

=== Track listings ===
Songs to Make Love To The Songs to Make Love To release, which was titled "Easy" on some pressings, was the American and Canadian release of the single. Its track list, which was almost identical to the German "I'm Easy" – special edition version which replaces track three with the re-recording of "As the Worm Turns" and is similar to the standard edition versions of "I'm Easy" which had the Revolution 23 Full Moon mix of "A Small Victory" as its third and last track, is as follows:

1. "Easy" – 3:10
2. "Das Schutzenfest" – 3:00
3. "Midnight Cowboy" (John Barry) – 4:15
4. "Let's Lynch the Landlord" (Jello Biafra) – 2:56

"I'm Easy" / "Be Aggressive" The double A-side release, "I'm Easy" / "Be Aggressive", features "Easy" and "Be Aggressive" as its first two tracks in addition to two live tracks, with the exception of one fully live version which is identical to the Free Concert in the Park bonus disc and a two-track French version. The standard track list is as follows:

1. "I'm Easy" – 3:06
2. "Be Aggressive" – 3:40
3. "A Small Victory" (live †) – 4:49
4. "We Care a Lot" (live †) – 4:02
4. "Mark Bowen" (live †) – 3:15

Japanese version The Japanese version was released separately as a seven-track EP under the name of "Easy" with the "I'm Easy" / "Be Aggressive" cover image along with six live tracks that also featured on other versions of the single; its track list was as follows:

1. "Easy"
2. "Easy" (live †)
3. "Be Aggressive" (live †)
4. "Land of Sunshine" (live ‡)
5. "RV" (live ‡)
6. "Kindergarten" (live †)
7. "A Small Victory" (live †)

† Live in Munich, Germany, on November 9, 1992
‡ Live in Dekalb, Illinois, September 20, 1992

=== Charts ===
==== Weekly charts ====
Chart (1993)	Peak position
Australia (ARIA)	1
Belgium (Ultratop 50 Flanders)	3
Canada Top Singles (RPM)	73
Europe (Eurochart Hot 100)	8
Europe (European Hit Radio)	6
Finland (Suomen virallinen lista)	5
Germany (GfK)	20
Iceland (Íslenski Listinn Topp 40)	2
Ireland (IRMA)	5
Netherlands (Dutch Top 40)	11
Netherlands (Single Top 100)	10
New Zealand (Recorded Music NZ)	6
Norway (VG-lista)	2
Portugal (AFP)	9
Sweden (Sverigetopplistan)	11
Switzerland (Schweizer Hitparade)	9
UK Singles (Official Charts)	3
UK Airplay (Music Week)	11
US Billboard Hot 100	58
US Cash Box Top 100	54

==== Year-end charts ====
Chart (1993)	Position
Australia (ARIA)	23
Belgium (Ultratop)	32
Europe (Eurochart Hot 100)	38
Europe (European Hit Radio)	20
Germany (Media Control)	53
Iceland (Íslenski Listinn Topp 40)	38
Netherlands (Dutch Top 40)	80
Netherlands (Single Top 100)	63
New Zealand (RIANZ)	35
Sweden (Topplistan)	74
Switzerland (Schweizer Hitparade)	27
UK Singles (OCC)	77

=== Certifications ===
Region	Certification	Certified units/sales
Australia (ARIA)	Platinum	70,000^{^}
New Zealand (RMNZ)	Platinum	30,000^{‡}
^{^} Shipments figures based on certification alone.^{‡} Sales+streaming figures based on certification alone.

=== Release history ===
Region	Date	Format(s)	Label(s)	Ref.
Europe	December 29, 1992	7-inch vinyl; CD; cassette	Slash; London	
United States	March 4, 1993	7-inch vinyl; CD; cassette	Slash; Reprise	
Japan	April 16, 1993	CD	Slash; London	

== Sky Ferreira version ==
American singer and songwriter Sky Ferreira released a rendition of the song for the soundtrack of the 2017 film Baby Driver, in which she plays Baby (Ansel Elgort)'s mother. It was produced by Nigel Godrich. To promote the track, a music video directed by the film's director, Edgar Wright, was released on September 4, 2017. On September 7, 2017, the video was uploaded to the 30th Records' official VEVO account.

== Barbara Mason version ==
A version of this song is present on compilation "Another Man" by American soul singer Barbara Mason released in 1995.

== Samples ==
"Easy" was sampled by the Houston-based rap group Geto Boys for the song "Six Feet Deep" from their 1993 album Till Death Do Us Part. It was also used as a sample in Cam'ron's 2002 song "Hey Ma" featuring Juelz Santana, Freeky Zekey and Toya from his album Come Home with Me.
