= James Anthony Carmichael =

American musician and record producer (1941–2026)

- Also known as: James Carmichael
- Born: September 14, 1941; Gadsden, Alabama, U.S.
- Died: May 23, 2026 (aged 84)
- Genres: R&B, soul
- Occupations: Arranger, record producer
- Years active: 1966–2026
- Labels: Mirwood, Motown

James Anthony Carmichael (September 14, 1941 – May 23, 2026) was an American Grammy-winning musician, arranger and record producer. At first he started off in Los Angeles as an arranger and producer for Motown acts like The Temptations and the Jackson 5. Carmichael went on to attain fame in arranging and producing artists such as the Commodores, Atlantic Starr, Diana Ross and Lionel Richie.

== Early life and career ==
Carmichael grew up in Gadsden, Alabama, and learned piano as a child. He played tuba in the Carver High School band, and graduated from there in 1959. He enrolled at the University of California, Los Angeles, with the intention of becoming a doctor, but his plans changed and he studied music at Los Angeles City College while developing a reputation as a session musician.

By 1966, he had started working with producer Fred Sledge Smith at Mirwood Records, with musicians including The Olympics (who had previously had hits with "Western Movies", "Hully Gully" and others), Bob & Earl, and the Soul Runners, who later became the Watts 103rd Street Rhythm Band. Carmichael also worked with other Mirwood musicians whose recordings later became popular as part of the Northern soul scene in Britain. Reviewer Jason Ankeny at AllMusic stated that Smith and Carmichael together honed "a distinctive style all their own, creating soul music that was both relentlessly energetic and sweetly sophisticated, topped off by trademark vibes that evoked the otherworldly beauty of a Pacific Ocean sunset." One of Smith and Carmichael's most successful records as an arrangement and production team was the 1967 album Silver Throat: Bill Cosby Sings, which included Cosby's #4 US pop hit "Little Ole Man (Uptight, Everything's Alright)".

In the late 1960s, Carmichael began working on a freelance basis with Motown artists in Los Angeles, including the Four Tops, the Miracles, and the Supremes. He was soon signed up by the company to work exclusively for them as an arranger, and worked on that basis with the Miracles, the Jackson 5, Michael Jackson, Marvin Gaye, Gladys Knight, Eddie Kendricks, and others. His greatest successes came after he was approached in 1974 to work with the Commodores, and agreed to do so after receiving assurances that he would be given production responsibilities on their recordings. He encouraged the group to record their own material, and produced their first hit, the instrumental "Machine Gun", as well as the album of the same name. He stayed working with the Commodores for the next seven years, co-producing with the band their successful albums Caught in the Act, Movin' On (both 1975), Hot on the Tracks (1976), Commodores (1977), Natural High (1978), Midnight Magic (1979), Heroes (1980), and In the Pocket (1981). Featuring their lead vocalist Lionel Richie, the band had a long series of hit singles, again co-produced by Carmichael, over the period, including "Slippery When Wet", "Sweet Love", "Just to Be Close to You", "Easy", "Brick House", "Too Hot Ta Trot", and two US #1 pop hits, "Three Times a Lady" and "Still". The Commodores acknowledged Carmichael's crucial role in their success.

When Richie left the Commodores in 1982 for a solo career, Carmichael went with him. The pair co-produced all Richie's albums and singles over the next few years, including the albums Lionel Richie (1982), Can't Slow Down (1983), and Dancing on the Ceiling (1986). The albums featured another string of hits co-produced by Carmichael, including four US number one records on the pop charts - "Truly", "All Night Long (All Night)", "Hello", and "Say You, Say Me". When Richie won his first American Music Award in 1984, he made a point of thanking Carmichael for his involvement. The song "All Night Long" was nominated for several Grammy awards, and Carmichael and Richie jointly won Grammies in 1984 for the album Can't Slow Down and as producers (non-classical) of the year. Richie credited Carmichael with giving him the inspiration to write the song "Hello", saying that Carmichael had come to his house:

As he turned the corner to come into the room, I turned to him and said: 'Hello, is it me you're looking for?' He said: 'Finish that song.'.... I kept saying to him, 'You gotta be kidding me, right? I was just joking.' He said, 'No no, that's incredible. Give me a verse to that.' So I actually went in writing this song not liking the song, thinking that it was corny. I mean, this is REALLY corny. This is not going to do well. Then by the time I finished the verse, I fell in love with the song again.

Carmichael also produced Atlantic Starr's albums Radiant (1981), Brilliance (1982), and Yours Forever (1983). He contributed to Kenny Rogers' album We've Got Tonight, and he and Richie co-produced Diana Ross' 1985 hit "Missing You", a tribute to Marvin Gaye. Carmichael also worked with the remaining Commodores on the group's 1986 album United. He returned to working with Lionel Richie on the 1996 album Louder Than Words, and on Richie's 1998 album Time.

== Personal life and death ==
Carmichael lived in Los Angeles throughout his life. He died at home on May 23, 2026, at the age of 84.

He was unrelated to James Carmichael, the lead singer with disco group Instant Funk.

== Awards ==
Carmichael won two Grammy Awards from five nominations.

Year	Category	Nominated work	Result
1983	Producer of The Year Non-Classical	-	Nominated
1983	Best Instrumental Arrangement Accompanying Vocal(s)	All Night Long (All Night) (Single)	Nominated
1983	Record of the Year	All Night Long (All Night) (Single)	Nominated
1984	Producer of The Year (Non-Classical)	-	Won
1984	Album of The Year	Can't Slow Down	Won
