= Three Times a Lady =

1978 single by Commodores

- A-side label of the U.S. vinyl single

Single by Commodores

from the album Natural High
- B-side: "Look What You've Done to Me"
- Released: June 9, 1978 (US)
- Genre: Pop; soft rock; adult contemporary; soul; R&B
- Length: 3:36 (7" version); 6:36 (12" version)
- Label: Motown
- Songwriter: Lionel Richie
- Producers: James Anthony Carmichael & Commodores

Commodores singles chronology
"Zoom" (1978)	"Three Times a Lady" (1978)	"Flying High" (1978)

"Three Times a Lady" is a 1978 song by American soul group Commodores for their album Natural High, written by lead singer Lionel Richie. It was produced by James Anthony Carmichael and Commodores.

It was Commodores' first number-one hit on the Billboard Hot 100, topping the chart for two weeks on August 12, 1978, and also reached number one on the soul chart for two weeks. It was the only Motown song to reach the top 10 on the US Billboard Hot 100 that year. The song also spent three weeks at number 1 on the Adult Contemporary chart.

The song also reached number one on the Canadian RPM Singles Chart for four weeks, and was one of only a few Motown singles to reach the top spot on the UK Singles Chart, staying there for five weeks. It was also successful in Ireland, staying at number one for three consecutive weeks. It was number one in Australia for five weeks, and reached number 2 in New Zealand.

== Background ==
As a student at Tuskegee University, Lionel Richie joined friends to form the band Commodores. The group primarily performed funk and party songs written by band members. Richie had grown up in a household full of varying kinds of music. His grandmother, Adelaide Foster, taught classical piano, and he was also inspired by the country music that was ubiquitous in Alabama.

At a party to celebrate his parents' 37th wedding anniversary, Richie's father toasted his mother, Alberta, saying "She's a great lady, she's a great mother, and she's a great friend." The toast inspired Richie to write a waltz, "Three Times a Lady", which he dedicated to his wife, Brenda. As Richie later told Dick Clark, the toast caused him to realize, "I haven't taken the time to tell my wife thank you. How many guys are in the same position?" Richie did not believe that a waltz would fit the Commodores' musical style, so he wrote it imagining that it would be sung by Frank Sinatra.

As the band prepared to record the album Natural High, group members presented various songs that they had written. Richie played "Three Times a Lady" for producer James Carmichael, with the warning that he intended to pitch the song to Sinatra. Carmichael insisted that the song be added to the Commodores' album.

== Release ==
In the United States, "Three Times a Lady" was the first of two singles off of Natural High. It entered the Billboard Hot 100 chart on June 18, 1978, at number 73. Eight weeks later, it reached number 1, where it remained for two weeks. It also reached the top of the R&B, soul and country charts. The song was the first number 1 single for the Commodores, and the first of their songs to be a top 10 hit in the United Kingdom. The song eventually reached the top of charts in the United Kingdom, South Africa, and Canada, and was in the top 5 on charts in 25 other countries.

Record World called it a "sentimental ballad" that should make the pop adult charts as well as the R&B charts.

The original Commodores' version of the song was included as the final track on Lionel Richie's greatest hits compilation album Back to Front, released in 1992.

== Impact ==
The song was a "smash hit" which launched the Commodores into a higher level of fame and notice. In large part due to the popularity of this song, the band was named the top R&B group of the year by Rolling Stone, Billboard, and Cashbox. Billboard also named them the number 3 pop group of 1978, making them one of the historically few non-white performers listed. "Three Times a Lady" was nominated for two Grammy awards, for Song of the Year and for Best Pop Vocal Performance by a Duo, Group, or Chorus. The song won a 1979 American Music Award and a People's Choice Award.

Many other artists reached out to Richie, asking him to write songs with them. Richie at first turned them all down, but eventually agreed to work with country singer Kenny Rogers. The collaboration resulted in Rogers' hit song "Lady".

== Chart performance ==
=== Year-end charts ===
Year-end chart performance for "Three Times a Lady"
Chart (1978)	Peak position
Australia (Kent Music Report)	8
Canada (RPM)	10

== Certifications ==
Region	Certification	Certified units/sales
New Zealand (RMNZ)	Gold	15,000^{‡}
^{‡} Sales+streaming figures based on certification alone.

== Conway Twitty version ==
"Three Times a Lady"

Single by Conway Twitty

from the album Lost in the Feeling
- B-side: "I Think I'm in Love"
- Released: November 1983
- Recorded: February 1–2, 1983; Sound Stage Studio, Nashville, Tennessee
- Genre: Country
- Length: 3:42
- Label: Warner Bros.
- Songwriter: Lionel Richie
- Producers: Jimmy Bowen, Conway Twitty

Conway Twitty singles chronology
"We Had It All" (1983)	"Three Times a Lady" (1983)	"Somebody's Needin' Somebody" (1984)

Conway Twitty's version appears on his 1983 album Lost in the Feeling. Twitty's version reached number 7 on the Billboard Hot Country Singles chart in the late winter of 1984 and number 4 in the Canadian charts. (#81 Year End) AllMusic reviewer Tom Jurek wrote that "Three Times a Lady" and the previous single, "Heartache Tonight" "offer(ed) a solid view of Twitty's amazing crossover potential, and his ability to take well-known pop tracks and turn them into solid country smashes long after the countrypolitan days of Chet Atkins and RCA."

== Other versions ==
Nate Harvell recorded a country version in 1978, reaching number 23 on the Billboard country chart and number 24 in Canada.

== See also ==
- Hot 100 number-one hits of 1978 (United States)
- List of UK Singles Chart number ones of the 1970s
- List of number-one singles of 1978 (Ireland)
