= Just to Be Close to You =

Single by Commodores

from the album Hot on the Tracks
- B-side: "Thumpin' Music"
- Released: August 1976
- Genre: Soul
- Length: 3:14 (single edit) 6:21 (album version)
- Label: Motown
- Songwriter: Lionel Richie
- Producers: Commodores, James Anthony Carmichael

Commodores singles chronology
"Slippery When Wet" (1975)	"Just to Be Close to You" (1976)	"Easy" (1977)

"Just to Be Close to You" is a song by American R&B/funk band, Commodores, in 1976. Released from their album, Hot on the Tracks, it would become one of their biggest hits, spending two weeks at the top of the Hot Soul Singles chart and becoming their second Billboard Hot 100 top ten, peaking at number seven. The song was written and sung by Lionel Richie.

Cash Box said that "there's a terrific spoken introduction, packed with soul, that gives way to a truly beautiful ballad."

== Charts ==
Chart (1976)	Peak position
Australia (Kent Music Report)	94
US Billboard Hot 100	7
US Billboard Hot Soul Singles	1

== See also ==
- List of number-one R&B singles of 1976 (U.S.)
