= Cal Harris (engineer) =

American sound engineer (1941–2017)

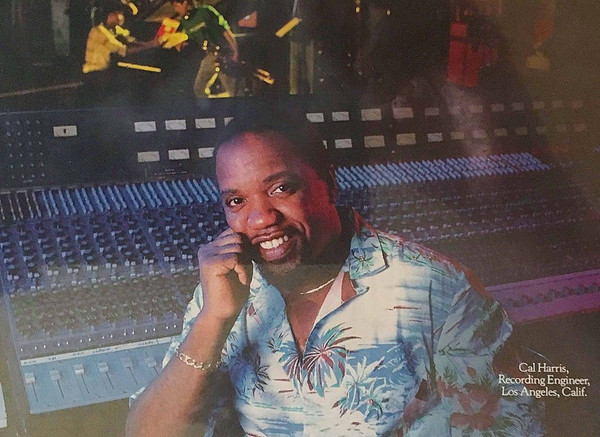
- Harris in California recording studio
- Born: Calvin Lawrence Harris; August 9, 1941; Marshall, Michigan
- Died: August 14, 2017 (aged 76); California
- Other names: Cal Harris, Cal "The Blade" Harris, Cal "RE20" Harris
- Occupations: Record producer; director of Motown recording; mixing engineer
- Awards: Won a Grammy for album of the year 1984 with Can't Slow Down; TEC Award Nominee for outstanding creative achievement as recording engineer in 1985

Calvin Lawrence Harris was an American sound engineer and the head of the recording department at Motown. He worked on projects such as Marvin Gaye's hit album What's Going On, The Beach Boys' single “Good Vibrations”, and Lionel Richie's Grammy award-winning album Can't Slow Down. He is the father of jazz musician Cal Harris Jr. and programmer/keyboard technician Eric Harris.

== Biography ==
Cal Harris Sr. was born on August 9, 1941, in Marshall, Michigan. He began his musical career at Gold Star Studios in Los Angeles, as an intern for The Beach Boys. His work for at Gold Star gained him the recognition to get hired by Motown Records in the late 1960s. At Motown he became the head of the recording department.

He died on August 14, 2017, in a California hospital due to natural causes.

== Working at Motown Records ==
As the head of the recording department at Motown, Cal Harris Sr. was tasked with managing the team of sound engineers employed by Motown. As well as finding/hiring new engineers and technicians. Within his discography Cal is credited for remix, recording engineer, mixing engineer, and even as a producer on the 1977 album Rarearth by American rock band Rare Earth.

With Lionel Richie, Cal Harris recorded Can't Slow Down, which went on to win the Grammy award for album of the year 1984. Due to the success of the album he was also nominated for a TEC award in 1985.

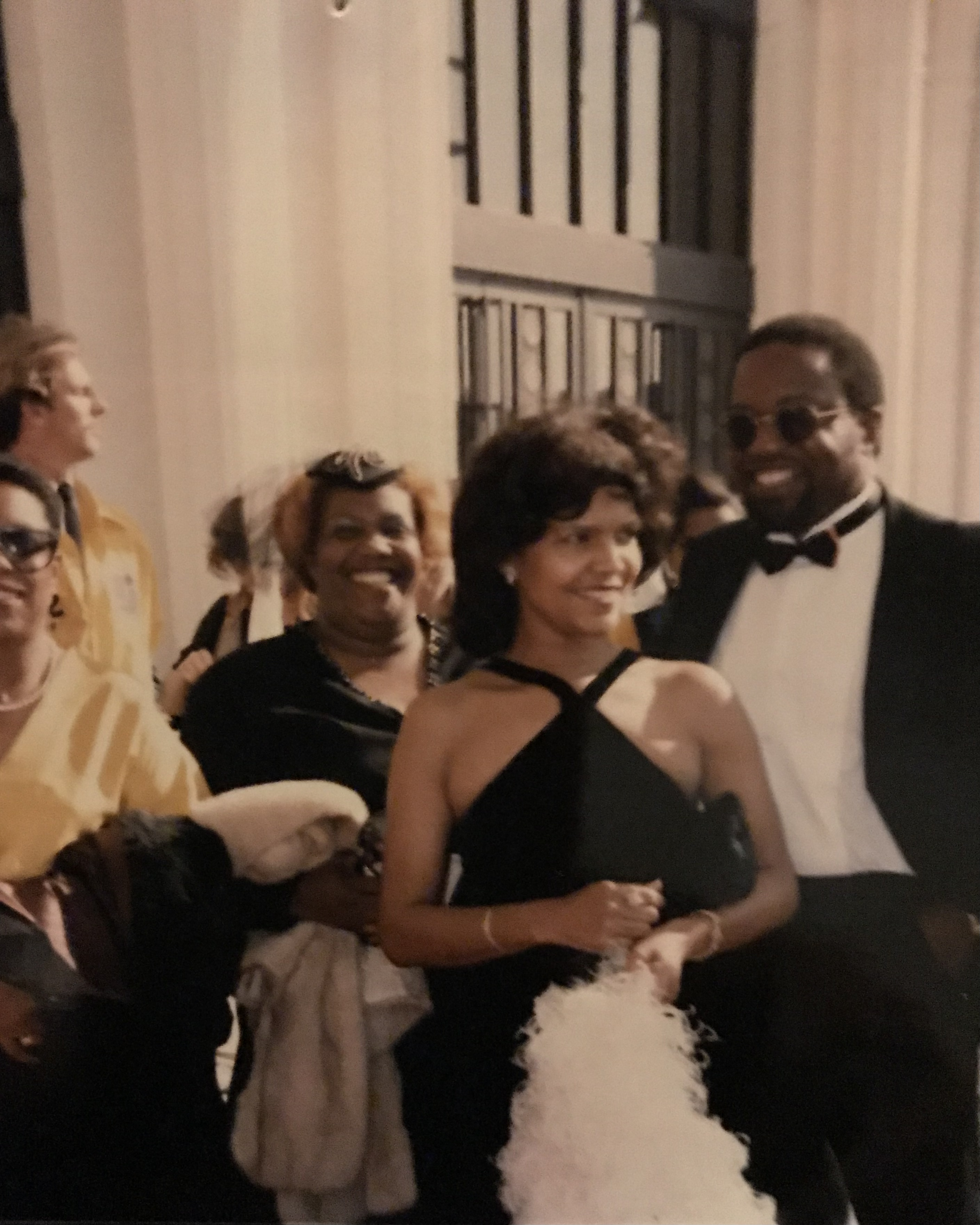
Cal Harris (far right) attending the 27th Annual Grammy Awards in 1985 with a few of his family members.
