= Thomas McClary (musician) =

American songwriter

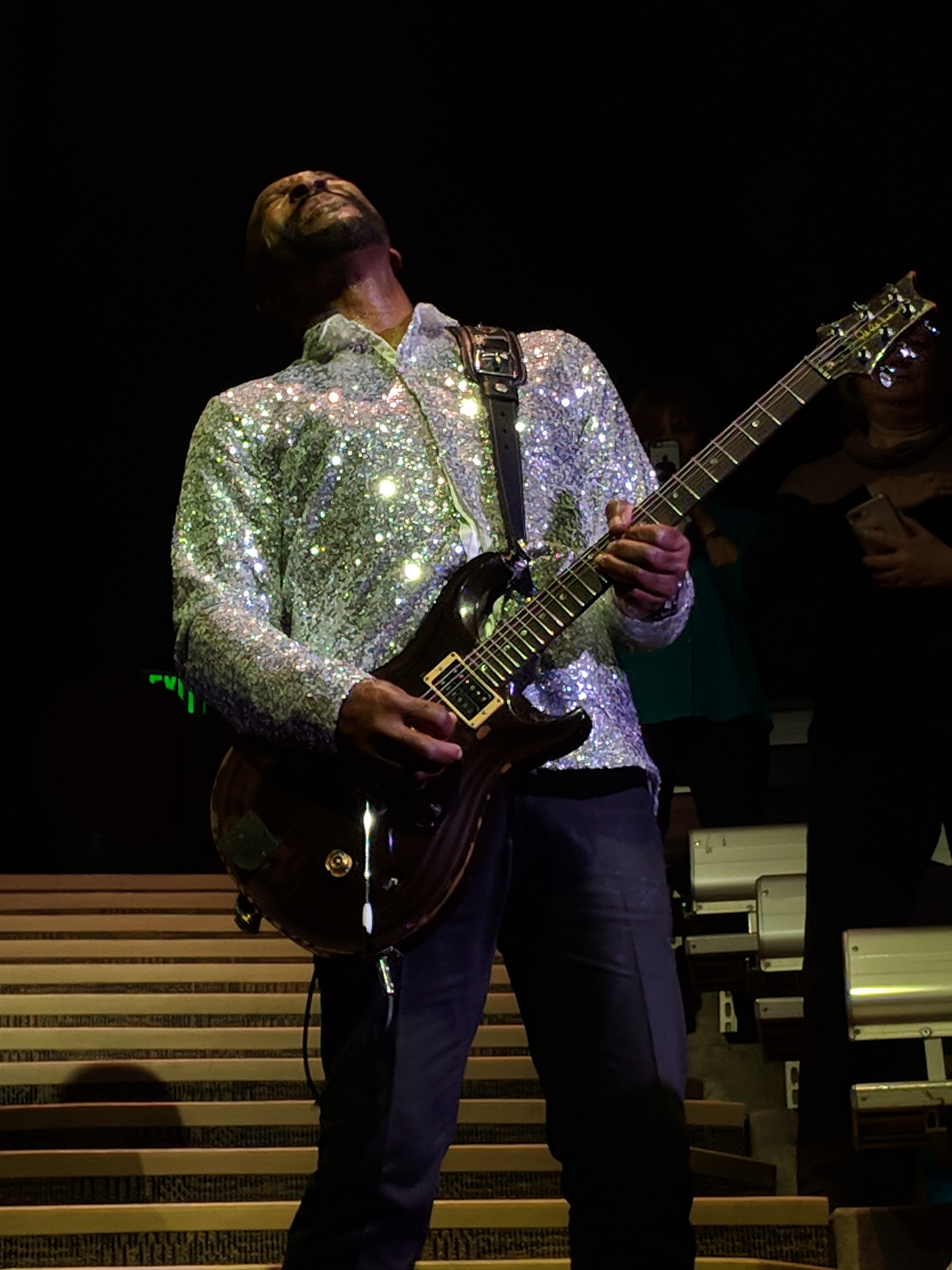
- McClary performing in 2019

Background information
- Born: October 6, 1949 (age 76); Eustis, Florida, United States
- Genres: Soul, R&B, Funk, Gospel, Rock
- Occupations: Musician guitarist songwriter singer record producer
- Instruments: Acoustic guitar, electric guitar, ukulele, vocals
- Years active: 1968–present
- Label: Motown Records
- Website: thomasmcclary.com

Thomas McClary (born October 6, 1949) is an American musician, guitarist, singer, songwriter, and record producer best known as the founder and lead guitarist of The Commodores. McClary is widely credited with having created the signature sound of The Commodores' original music.

== Early life ==
McClary was born in Eustis, Florida, in 1949. He became one of the first African-American students to integrate the Florida school system prior to the enforcement of Brown v. Board of Education. McClary began playing music at a very early age, starting with the ukulele and then adding the acoustic guitar and later the electric guitar to his repertoire. After graduation, McClary went to college at Tuskegee University in Alabama where he majored in business.

== Career ==
As a freshman student at Tuskegee University, McClary met Lionel Richie in the registration line. The two became friends and in 1968 they began to put together a band which they originally called The Mystics. McClary played the lead guitar. The group played local gigs, added members and changed their name to the Commodores. In 1972, the Commodores signed with Berry Gordy and Motown Records.

Thomas McClary performing at the SCERA in Orem, Utah, 2018

McClary spent 15 years as the lead guitarist for the Commodores. His guitar solo in the Commodores song "Easy" earned him his first write-up in Rolling Stone and was called "one of the best solo guitar performances of all time" by writer Dave Thompson. While with the Commodores, McClary wrote one of the group's early number one singles "Slippery When Wet". "Brick House"," "Too Hot ta Trot", and "I Feel Sanctified" are among the many songs McClary contributed to, along with the Commodores. He sang lead on "Sexy Lady" and "Ooo Woman You" (a duet with Melissa Manchester). He played on songs like "Flying High", "Come Inside", "High On Sunshine", "Girl, I Think the World About You", "Midnight Magic", "12:01 am", "Got To Be Together", "Wake Up Children", "Funny Feelings", "Heaven Knows", "Won't You Come Dance With Me", "Visions", "Hold On" and "Free", "Welcome Home" (with Bill Champlin), "You Don't Know That I Know", "Let's Get Started", "Time", "Captured", "Celebrate" (with Larry Davis and Harold Hudson), "Saturday Night" and "Keep On Taking Me Higher".

McClary's musical influence then moved outside of just The Commodores. From the Endless Love soundtrack, he co-wrote (with Lionel Richie) "Dreaming of You" which was performed by Richie and Diana Ross as well as Kenny Rogers' "Without You in My Life". Another was the track "Steam Room" off of Jayne Kennedy's Complete Exercise Program. McClary co-wrote and produced multiple songs for the 1980s pop group Klique's album Try It Out (one of which was "Stop Dogging Me Around" which became the No. 1 song on the Black Contemporary Charts") and "Love Circles". McClary also co-wrote and produced four songs for bassist Michael Henderson's Fickel album.

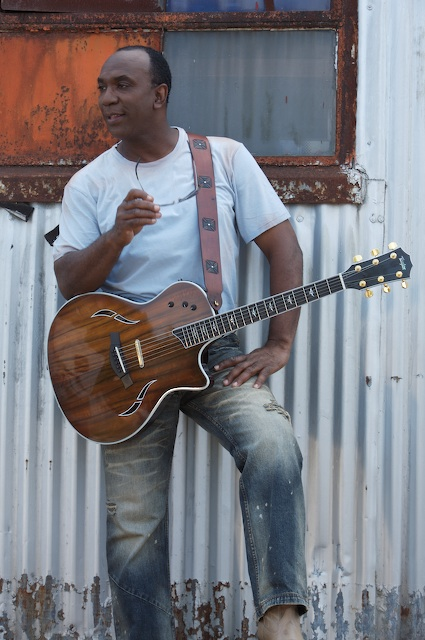
McClary in 2007

After deciding to leave the Commodores in 1984, McClary signed a solo contract with Motown and the following year released a solo album titled, Thomas McClary, which featured the single "Thin Walls". It peaked at No. 57 on the Billboard R&B chart.

In 1986, McClary returned to Florida and turned to his Christian roots by becoming the music director of his church and forming a gospel music record label, under which he released the 2008 album titled A Revolution Not a Revival.

On September 18, 2017, McClary's memoir Rock and Soul, was released.

== Solo discography ==
- 1984 – Thomas McClary (Motown)
- 2008 – A Revolution Not a Revival (CDBY)

== Filmography ==
- 1977 – Scott Joplin (w/The Commodores)
- 1977 – Looking for Mr. Goodbar (w/The Commodores)
- 1977 – James at 15 (w/The Commodores)
- 1978 – Thank God It's Friday (w/The Commodores)
- 1982 – The Last American Virgin (w/The Commodores)
- 1986 – One More Saturday Night (songwriter)
