= Commodores =

American funk and soul band

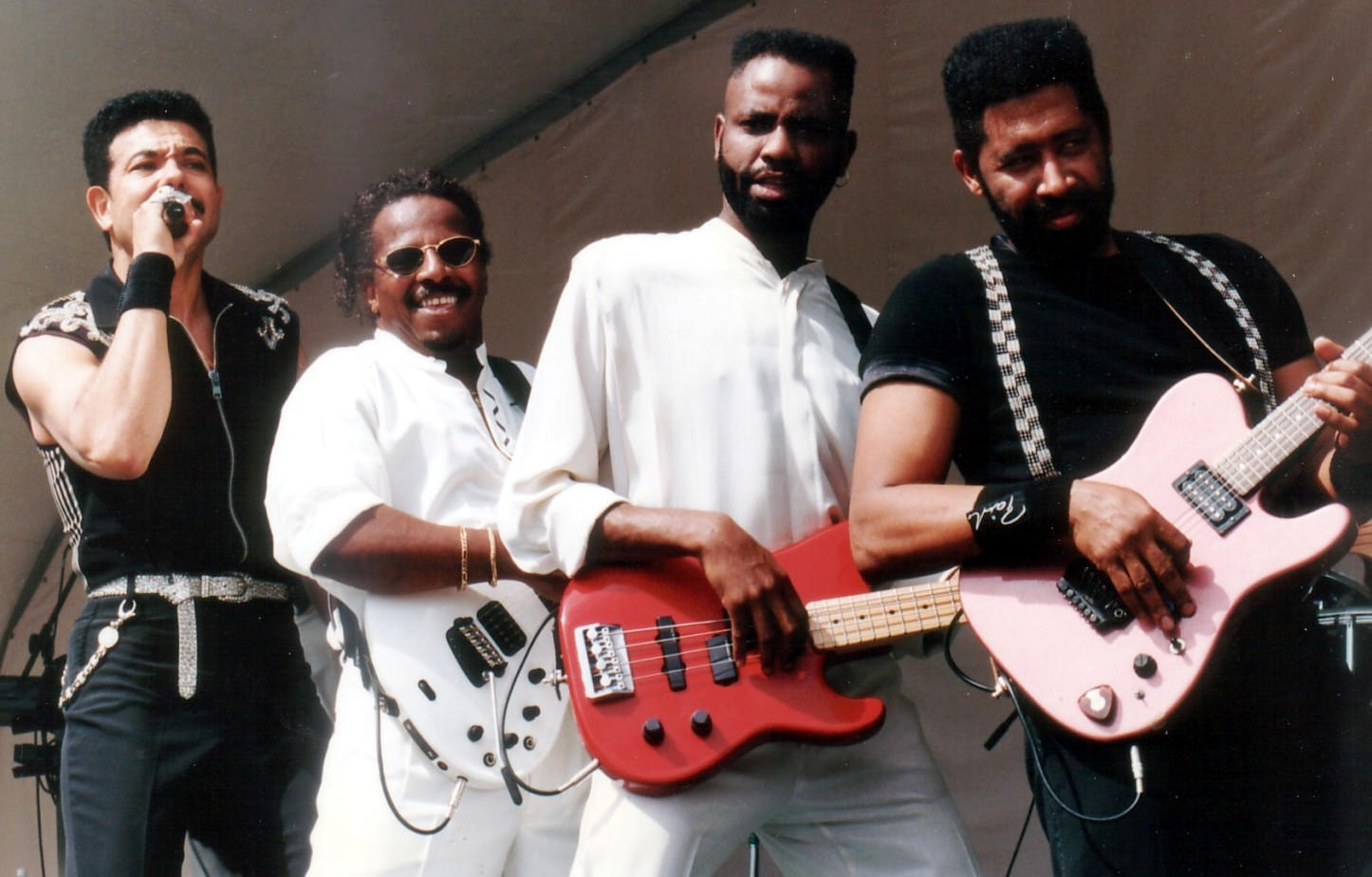
- The Commodores in Hallandale, Florida, in the 1990s

Background information
- Origin: Tuskegee, Alabama, U.S.
- Genres: Funk; soul; R&B; pop; disco
- Years active: 1968–present
- Labels: Motown; Polydor
- Members: William King; Brent Carter; Cody Orange; Colin Orange
- Past members: Milan Williams; Thomas McClary; Lionel Richie; Ronald LaPread; Andre Callahan; Michael Gilbert; James Ingram; Skyler Jett; Sheldon Reynolds; Eugene Ward; Violet Orange; Mikael Manley; David Hodges; Chelsea Powell; Tom Joyner; John Smith; Walter Orange; J.D. Nicholas; Pierre Lewis
- Website: www.commodoreslive.com

Commodores, often billed as the Commodores, are an American funk and soul group. The group's most successful period was in the late 1970s and early 1980s when Lionel Richie was the co-lead singer.

The members of the group met as mostly freshmen at Tuskegee Institute (now Tuskegee University) in 1968, and signed with Motown in November 1972, having first caught the public eye opening for the Jackson 5 while on tour.

The band's biggest hit singles are ballads such as "Easy", "Three Times a Lady", and "Nightshift"; and funk-influenced dance songs, including "Brick House", "Fancy Dancer", "Lady (You Bring Me Up)", and "Too Hot ta Trot".

Commodores were inducted into the Alabama Music Hall of Fame and Vocal Group Hall of Fame. The band has also won one Grammy Award out of nine nominations. The Commodores have sold over 70 million albums worldwide.

== History ==
Commodores were formed from two former student groups: the Mystics and the Jays. Richie described some members of the Mystics as "jazz buffs". The new six-man band featured Lionel Richie, Thomas McClary, and William King from the Mystics, and Andre Callahan, Michael Gilbert, and Milan Williams from the Jays. They chose their present name when King flipped open a dictionary and ran his finger down the page. "We lucked out," he remarked with a laugh when telling this story to People magazine. "We almost became 'The Commodes.'"

The bandmembers attended Tuskegee Institute in Alabama. After winning the college's annual freshman talent contest, they played at fraternity parties as well as a weekend gig at the Black Forest Inn, one of a few clubs in Tuskegee that catered to college students. They performed cover tunes and some original songs with their first singer, James Ingram (not the famous solo artist). Ingram, older than the rest of the band, left to serve in Vietnam, and was later replaced by drummer Walter "Clyde" Orange, who wrote or co-wrote many of their hits. Richie and Orange alternated as lead singers. Orange was the lead singer on the Top 10 hits "Brick House" (1977) and "Nightshift" (1985).

Bassist Michael Gilbert was also drafted to serve in Vietnam. Ronald LaPread, a keyboardist, told the band he was "the baddest-ass player in Tuskegee," then spent the next few days learning to play the bass. He joined the band in 1970.

The early band was managed by Benny Ashburn, who brought them to his family's vacation lodge on Martha's Vineyard in 1971 and 1972. There, Ashburn test-marketed the group by having them play in parking lots and summer festivals.

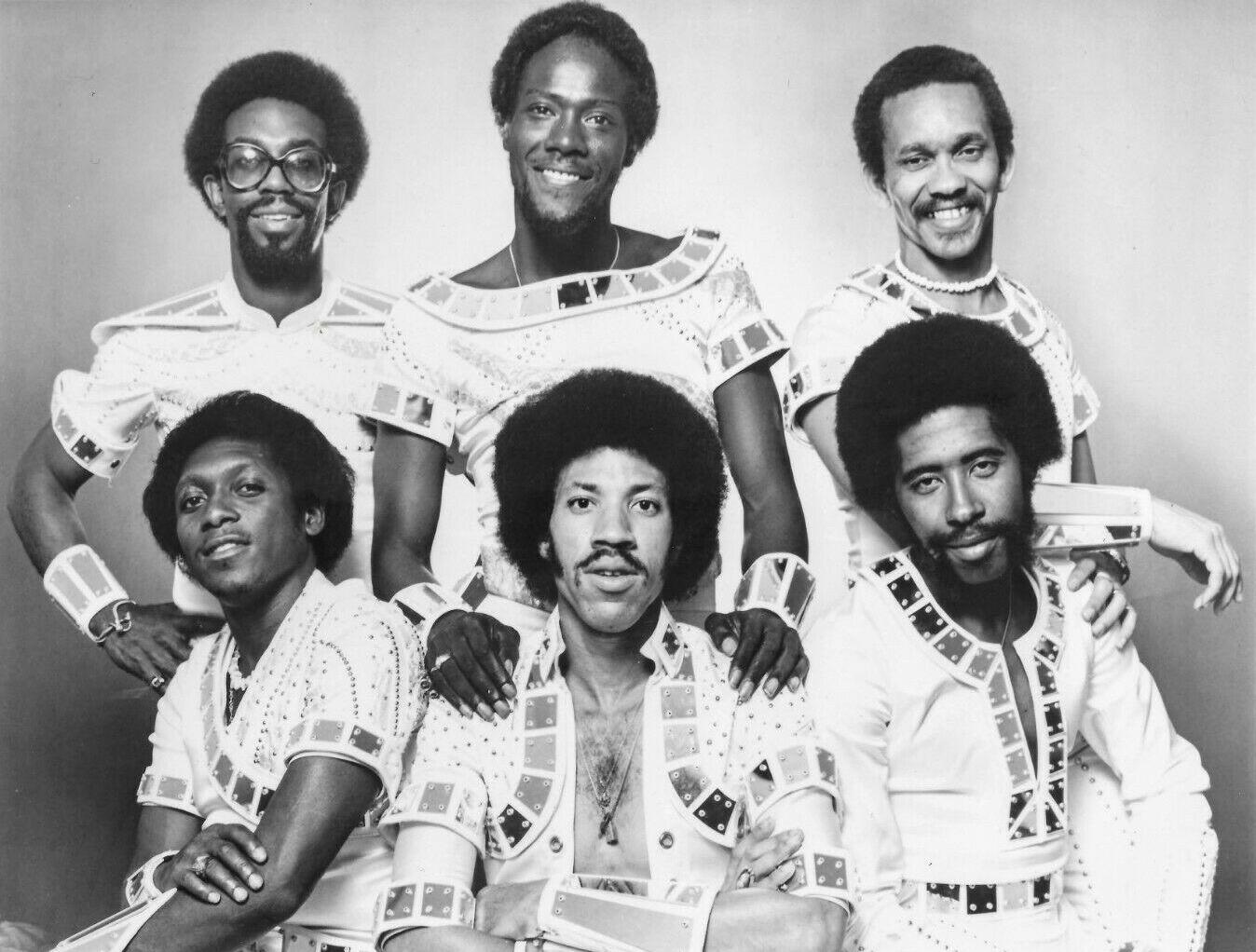
The Commodores, in an early 1970s publicity photograph

"Machine Gun" (1974), the instrumental title track from the band's debut album, became a staple at American sporting events, and is also heard in many films, including Boogie Nights and Looking for Mr. Goodbar. It reached No. 22 on the Billboard Hot 100 in 1974. Another 1974 song "I Feel Sanctified" has been called a "prototype" of Wild Cherry's 1976 big hit "Play That Funky Music". Their three albums released in 1975 and 1976, Caught in the Act, Movin' On and Hot on the Tracks were funk albums, with the latter being their first to reach number 1 on the Billboard R&B Albums chart in 1976. After those recordings the group developed the mellower sound hinted at in their 1976 top-ten hits, "Sweet Love" and "Just to Be Close to You". In 1977, the Commodores released "Easy", which became the group's biggest hit yet, reaching No. 4 in the US, followed by funky single "Brick House", also top 5, both from their album Commodores, as was "Zoom". The group reached No. 1 in 1978 with "Three Times a Lady". In 1979, the Commodores scored another top-five ballad, "Sail On", before reaching the top of the charts once again with another ballad, "Still". In 1981 they released two top-ten hits with "Oh No" (No. 4) and their first upbeat single in almost five years, "Lady (You Bring Me Up)" (No. 8).

Commodores made a brief appearance in the 1978 film Thank God It's Friday. They performed the song "Too Hot ta Trot" during the dance contest; the songs "Brick House" and "Easy" were also played in the movie.

In 1982, the group decided to take a hiatus from touring and recording, during which time Lionel Richie recorded a solo album at the suggestion of Motown and the other group members. Its success encouraged Richie to pursue a solo career, and Skyler Jett replaced him as co-lead singer. Also in 1982, Ashburn died of a heart attack at the age of 54.

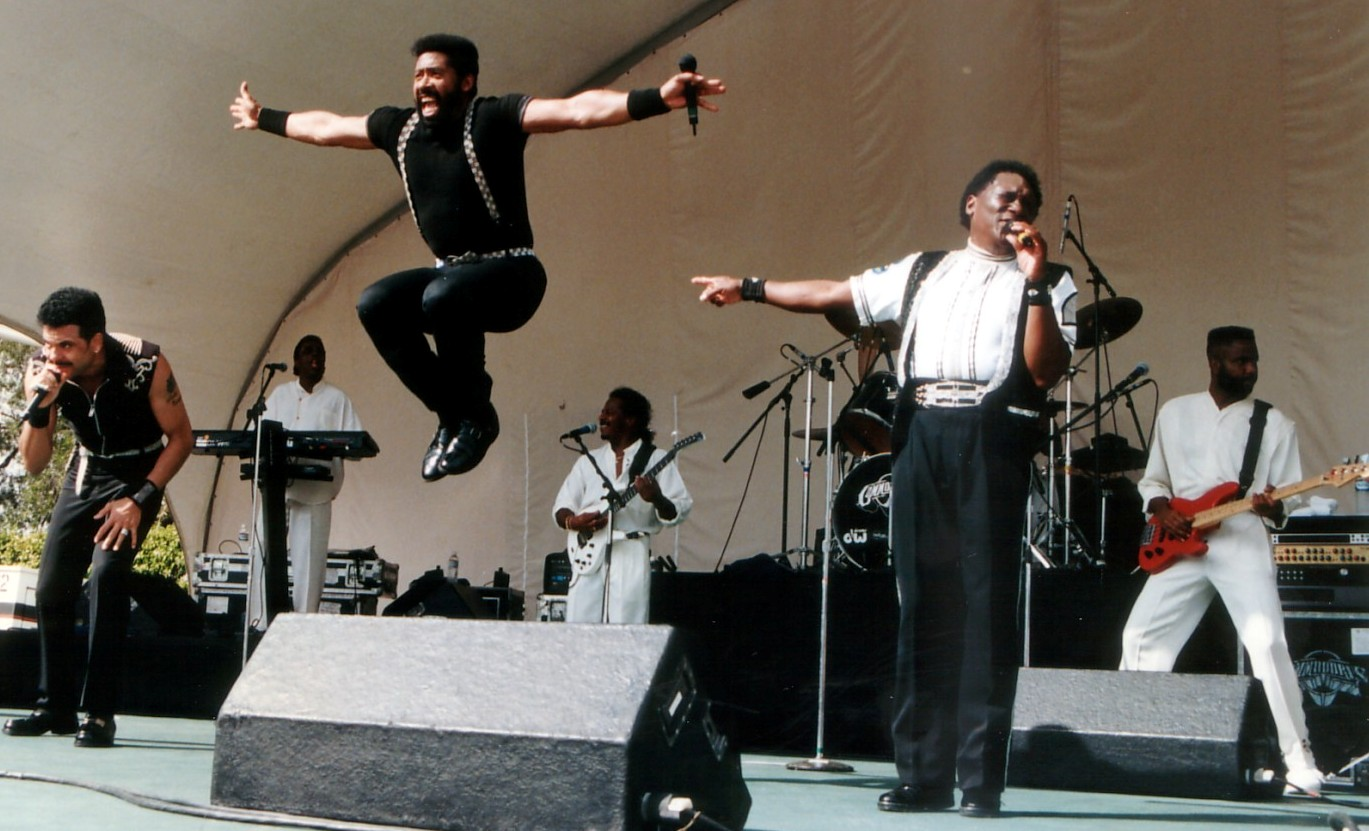
Band performance in Florida during the 1990s

Founding member McClary left in 1984 (shortly after Richie) to pursue a solo career, and to develop a gospel music company. McClary was replaced by guitarist-vocalist Sheldon Reynolds. Then LaPread left in 1986 and moved to Auckland, New Zealand. Reynolds departed for Earth, Wind & Fire in 1987, which prompted trumpeter William "WAK" King to take over primary guitar duties for live performances. Keyboardist Milan Williams exited the band in 1989 after allegedly refusing to tour South Africa.

The group gradually abandoned its funk roots and moved into the more commercial pop arena. In 1984, former Heatwave singer James Dean "J.D." Nicholas replaced Jett, assuming co-lead vocal duties with drummer Walter Orange. That line-up was hitless until 1985 when their final Motown album Nightshift, produced by Dennis Lambert (prior albums were produced by James Anthony Carmichael, who would continue to work with Richie on his albums), delivered the title track "Nightshift", a loving tribute to Marvin Gaye and Jackie Wilson, both of whom had died the previous year. "Nightshift" hit no. 3 in the US and won the Commodores their first Grammy for Best R&B Performance by a Duo or Group With Vocals in 1985.

In 2010 a new version was recorded, dedicated to Michael Jackson. The Commodores were on a European tour performing at Wembley Arena, London, on June 25, 2009, when they walked off the stage after they were told that Michael Jackson had died. Initially the band thought it was a hoax. However, back in their dressing rooms they received confirmation and broke down in tears. The next night at Birmingham's NIA Arena, J.D. Nicholas added Jackson's name to the lyrics of the song, and henceforth the Commodores have mentioned Jackson and other deceased R&B singers. Thus came the inspiration upon the first anniversary of Jackson's death to re-record, with new lyrics, the hit song "Nightshift" as a tribute.

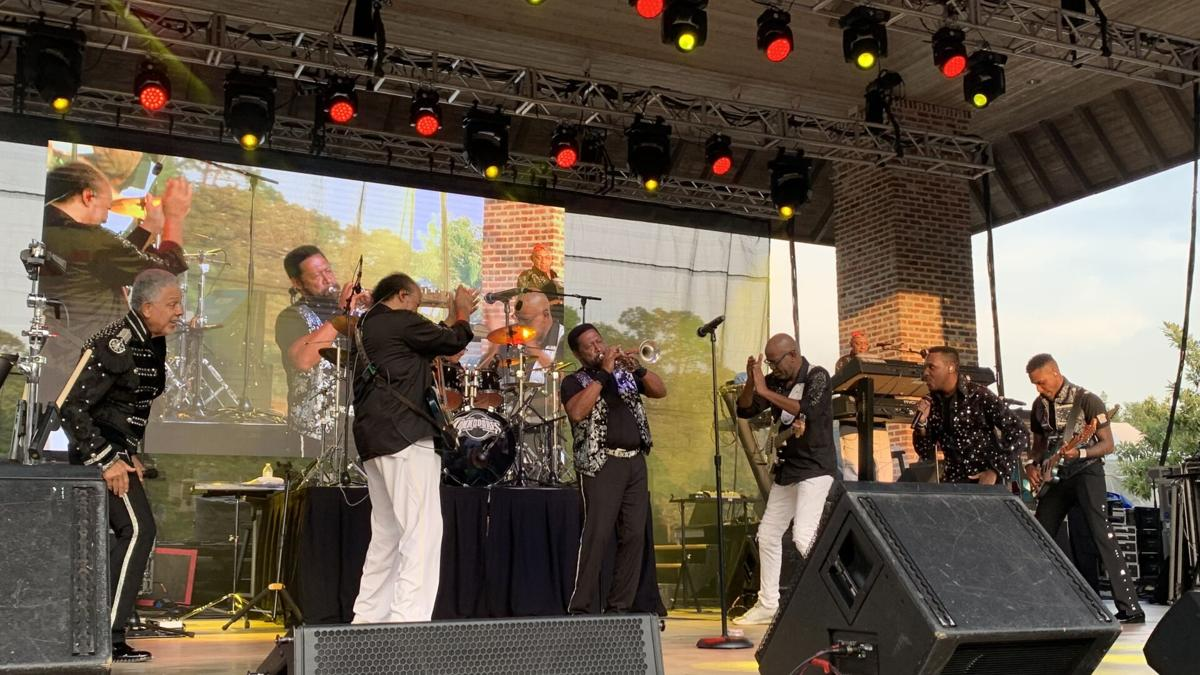
Commodores performing at the 25th Natchitoches Jazz and R&B Festival in 2022

In 1990, they formed Commodores Records and re-recorded their 20 greatest hits as Commodores Hits Vol. I & II. They have recorded a live album, Commodores Live, along with a DVD of the same name, and a Christmas album titled Commodores Christmas. In 2012, the band was working on new material, with some contributions written by current and former members.

The Commodores as of 2025 consist of original member, William "WAK" King along with Brent Carter, Cody Orange, and Colin Orange (both Walter's sons). Also featured is their five-piece band The Mean Machine. They continue to perform, playing at arenas, theaters, and festivals around the world.

Ronald LaPread died in Auckland, New Zealand on May 30, 2026, at the age of 75.

== Personnel ==
=== Current members ===
- William "WAK" King – trumpet, guitar, keyboards, vocals (1968–present)
- Brent Carter – vocals (2025–present)
- Cody Orange – vocals (2025–present)
- Colin Orange – guitar, keyboards, vocals (2025–present)

=== Former members ===
- Lionel Richie – vocals, keyboards, saxophone (1968–1982)
- Milan Williams – keyboards, rhythm guitar (1968–1989; died 2006)
- Thomas McClary – lead guitar, vocals (1968–1983)
- Andre Callahan – drums, vocals, keyboards (1968–70)
- Michael Gilbert – bass guitar, trumpet (1968–1970)
- Eugene Ward – keyboards (1968–1970)
- Ronald LaPread – bass guitar (1970–1986; died 2026)
- James Ingram – vocals, drums (1970–1972)
- Skyler Jett – vocals (1982–1984)
- Sheldon Reynolds – lead guitar (1983–1987; died 2023)
- Mikael Manley – lead guitar (1995–2005)
- Don Williams Sr – keyboards (1999–2001)
- James Dean "J.D." Nicholas – vocals (1984–2024)
- Walter "Clyde" Orange – vocals, drums (1972–2024)
- Pierre Lewis - keyboards (2012-2025)

== Discography ==
Studio albums

- Machine Gun (1974)
- Caught in the Act (1975)
- Movin' On (1975)
- Hot on the Tracks (1976)
- Commodores (1977)
- Natural High (1978)
- Midnight Magic (1979)
- Heroes (1980)
- In the Pocket (1981)
- Commodores 13 (1983)
- Nightshift (1985)
- United (1986)
- Rock Solid (1988)
- Commodores Christmas (1992)
- No Tricks (1993)

== Accolades ==
=== Grammy awards ===
The Commodores have won one Grammy Award out of ten nominations.

Grammy Awards
Year	Category	Work	Result
1978	Best Rhythm & Blues Vocal Performance – Duo, Group Or Chorus	"Easy" "Brick House"	Nominated
1979	Best Rhythm & Blues Vocal Performance – Duo, Group Or Chorus	"Natural High"	Nominated
1979	Best Pop Vocal Performance by a Duo or Group	"Three Times A Lady"	Nominated
1980	Best Pop Vocal Performance by a Duo or Group	"Sail On"	Nominated
1980	Best Rhythm & Blues Vocal Performance – Duo, Group Or Chorus	"Midnight Magic"	Nominated
1981	Best Rhythm & Blues Vocal Performance – Duo, Group Or Chorus	"Heroes"	Nominated
1981	Best Inspirational Performance	"Jesus Is Love"	Nominated
1982	Best Rhythm & Blues Vocal Performance – Duo, Group Or Chorus	"Lady (You Bring Me Up)"	Nominated
1986	Best Rhythm & Blues Vocal Performance – Duo, Group Or Chorus	"Nightshift"	Won

=== Alabama Music Hall of Fame ===
During 1995 the Commodores were inducted into the Alabama Music Hall of Fame.

=== Vocal Group Hall of Fame ===
During 2003 the Commodores were also inducted into the Vocal Group Hall of Fame.
