= Milan Williams =

American musician (1948–2006)

Milan B. Williams
- Born: Milan B. Williams; March 28, 1948; Okolona, Mississippi, U.S.
- Died: July 9, 2006 (aged 58) Houston, Texas, U.S.
- Genres: Soul, funk, R&B
- Occupation: songwriter
- Instrument: Keyboards
- Years active: 1967–1989 (with The Commodores)
- Formerly of: The Commodores

Milan B. Williams (March 28, 1948 – July 9, 2006) was an American keyboardist and a founding member of The Commodores.

He was born in Okolona, Mississippi, and began playing the piano after being inspired by his older brother Earl, who was a multi-instrumentalist. Williams's first band was called The Jays. After they disbanded, he met the other founding members of the Commodores in 1967. They were freshmen at Tuskegee Institute, Alabama and Williams was recruited into the newly formed band. In 1969 he traveled with the band to New York City, where they recorded a single called "Keep on Dancing" on Atlantic Records.

Williams also wrote the Commodores' first hit record, the instrumental track "Machine Gun". Other Commodores songs penned by him are: "The Bump", "Rapid Fire", "I'm Ready", "Better Never Than Forever", "Mary Mary", "Quick Draw", "Patch It Up", "X-Rated Movie", "Wonderland", "Old-Fashion Love", "Only You" (a track Williams also produced, taken from the Commodores first LP without Lionel Richie, Commodores 13), "You Don't Know That I Know", "Let's Get Started" and "Brick House".

While on his way to a concert in 1980 Williams crash-landed his single-engine plane on a freeway in Phoenix, Arizona after it developed engine troubles. He and The Commodores' press agent, Lester Mornay, escaped injury, jumping from the plane before it burst into flames. He left the Commodores in 1989, allegedly after refusing to perform with them in South Africa.

Williams died of cancer at MD Anderson Hospital, Houston, Texas, on July 9, 2006, aged 58.

His nephew Kebbi Williams is an experimental/free jazz saxophonist in Atlanta.
