= William King (singer) =

American singer

- King performing as part of the Commodores in the 1990s
- Born: January 30, 1949 (age 77); Birmingham, Alabama, U.S.
- Other name: Wak
- Occupations: Singer; musician; songwriter
- Years active: 1968–present
- Spouses: Shirley Hanna-King (m. 1976) Deborah Walker-King (m. 2020)

William King (born January 30, 1949) is an American singer, musician and choreographer. He is a founding member of the Commodores, where he plays trumpet, guitar, synthesizer, flute, and congas/percussion and is the group's choreographer.

== Background ==
King was born in Birmingham, Alabama. After attending Tuskegee University, where he received all-conference selections in the SIAC, he considered playing tennis professionally but decided to continue his career with the Commodores. King was also hired by a digital computer company to write software but gave that up as well to join the band.

King's compositions include "Lady" and "I'm In Love", both of which he co-composed with Harold Hudson and his wife Shirley Hanna-King. The latter was the B side to their single "Janet" which was released in 1985.

== Personal life ==
King married his songwriting partner and fellow Grammy Award nominee, Shirley Hanna-King in 1976 and they have four children. King is an avid tennis player, inducted to the SIAC Hall of Fame in 2024, and has participated in many tournaments. King married Deborah Walker-King in 2020.
