= All the Hits, All Night Long =

2013–15 concert tour by Lionel Richie

- Tour by Lionel Richie
- Promotional poster for the tour
- Start date: September 18, 2013
- End date: July 30, 2015
- Legs: 6
- No. of shows: 52 in North America; 11 in Oceania; 9 in Asia; 53 in Europe; 125 Total

Lionel Richie concert chronology
- Tuskegee Tour (2012); All the Hits, All Night Long (2013–15); All the Hits Tour (2017)

All the Hits, All Night Long was a concert tour by American singer-songwriter, musician, and record producer, Lionel Richie.

== Background ==
"I've been around artists that say, 'I just won't play my hits. I'll play something new'. That's why I'm saying it's all the hits, all night. This is just back-to-back karaoke on steroids".

On June 7, 2013, in partnership with NBC and The Today Show, Richie announced that he will launch ‘All the Hits All Night Long’, his first North American tour in over a decade. The tour will visit stadiums and arenas across the United States, Canada, and Mexico, beginning on September 18 in Hollywood, Florida and ending on October 18 in Los Angeles.

Richie said in a media release: "I’m so lucky to have the collection of songs that I can play for my fans, it becomes a giant sing-along most nights", he said in a statement. "People always ask me ‘what are you going to sing tonight Lionel?’ and I always laugh and reply, ‘what are YOU going to sing tonight?’"

Before these, In support of his tenth studio album, Tuskegee, Richie announced an extensive 2012 European tour that featured stops in Austria, Belgium, France, the Netherlands, Hungary, Monaco, Luxembourg, Czech Republic, Denmark, Finland, Norway, Sweden, Switzerland, Ireland and around the UK.

== Opening acts ==
- CeeLo Green (North America, leg 4)
- Marion Raven (Europe, leg 5)
- John Farnham (Australia)
- Larissa Eddie (United Kingdom)
- Dumpstaphunk (New York City, Atlanta, Houston, San Jose, Los Angeles)
- Anastacia (Münster)

== Setlist ==
The following setlist was obtained from the October 17, 2013 concert in San Jose, California at the SAP Center at San Jose. It does not represent all shows during the tour.

1. "Just for You"
2. "Penny Lover"
3. "Easy"
4. "My Love"
5. "Ballerina Girl"
6. "You Are"
7. "Truly"
8. "Endless Love"
9. "Running with the Night"
10. "Still"
11. "Oh No"
12. "Stuck on You"
13. "Dancing on the Ceiling" (contains elements of "Jump")
14. "Three Times a Lady"
15. "Love Will Find a Way"
16. "The Only One"
17. "Sail On"
18. "Fancy Dancer" / "Sweet Love / "Lady (You Bring Me Up)"
19. "Just to Be Close to You"
20. "Zoom"
21. "Say You, Say Me"
22. "Brick House" (contains excerpts from "Fire")
23. "Hello"
24. "All Night Long (All Night)"

Encore

25. "We Are the World"

== Tour dates ==
Date	City	Country	Venue
North America
September 18, 2013	Hollywood	United States	Hard Rock Live
September 21, 2013	Atlantic City	United States	Borgata Event Center
September 22, 2013	Ledyard	United States	MGM Grand Theater
September 24, 2013^{[A]}	Brooklyn	United States	Barclays Center
September 25, 2013	Fairfax	United States	Patriot Center
September 27, 2013	Atlanta	United States	Chastain Park Amphitheater
September 28, 2013	Nashville	United States	Bridgestone Arena
September 29, 2013	Chicago	United States	United Center
October 2, 2013	Rama	Canada	Casino Rama Entertainment Centre
October 3, 2013	Windsor	Canada	The Colosseum at Caesars Windsor
October 5, 2013	Catoosa	United States	The Joint, Tulsa
October 6, 2013^{[B]}	Austin	United States	Zilker Park
October 9, 2013	Mexico City	Mexico	Arena Ciudad de México
October 12, 2013	The Woodlands	United States	Cynthia Woods Mitchell Pavilion
October 13, 2013^{[B]}	Austin	United States	Zilker Park
October 17, 2013	San Jose	United States	HP Pavilion at San Jose
October 18, 2013	Los Angeles	United States	Hollywood Bowl
Oceania
March 2, 2014^{[C]}	Caversham	Australia	Sandalford Wines Estate
March 5, 2014	Adelaide	Australia	Adelaide Entertainment Centre
March 8, 2014	Pokolbin	Australia	Tempus Two Winery Estate
March 10, 2014	Brisbane	Australia	Brisbane Entertainment Centre
March 11, 2014	Brisbane	Australia	Brisbane Entertainment Centre
March 13, 2014	Sydney	Australia	Allphones Arena
March 16, 2014	Melbourne	Australia	Rod Laver Arena
March 17, 2014	Melbourne	Australia	Rod Laver Arena
March 20, 2014	Christchurch	New Zealand	CBS Canterbury Arena
March 22, 2014	New Plymouth	New Zealand	TSB Bowl of Brooklands
March 23, 2014	Auckland	New Zealand	Vector Arena
Asia
March 27, 2014	Yokohama	Japan	National Convention Hall of Yokohama
March 29, 2014	Kobe	Japan	World Memorial Hall
March 31, 2014	Tokyo	Japan	Nippon Budokan
April 3, 2014	Jakarta	Indonesia	JCC Plenary Hall
April 5, 2014	Quezon City	Philippines	Smart Araneta Coliseum
April 8, 2014	Shanghai	China	Mercedes-Benz Arena
April 13, 2014	Genting Highlands	Malaysia	Arena of Stars
April 14, 2014	Singapore		Singapore Indoor Stadium
April 17, 2014	Dubai	United Arab Emirates	Dubai Media City Amphitheater
North America
May 29, 2014	Vancouver	Canada	Rogers Arena
May 30, 2014	Seattle	United States	KeyArena
June 1, 2014	Concord	United States	Concord Pavilion
June 3, 2014	Anaheim	United States	Honda Center
June 6, 2014	Las Vegas	United States	Mandalay Bay Events Center
June 7, 2014	Chula Vista	United States	Sleep Train Amphitheatre
June 8, 2014	Phoenix	United States	Ak-Chin Pavilion
June 10, 2014	West Valley City	United States	USANA Amphitheatre
June 11, 2014	Morrison	United States	Red Rocks Amphitheatre
June 15, 2014	Tinley Park	United States	First Midwest Bank Amphitheatre
June 17, 2014	Louisville	United States	KFC Yum! Center
June 18, 2014	Memphis	United States	FedExForum
June 20, 2014	Clarkston	United States	DTE Energy Music Theatre
June 22, 2014	Cincinnati	United States	Riverbend Music Center
June 24, 2014	Mansfield	United States	Xfinity Center
June 25, 2014	Wantagh	United States	Nikon at Jones Beach Theater
June 27, 2014	Holmdel Township	United States	PNC Bank Arts Center
July 4, 2014^{[D]}	New Orleans	United States	Mercedes-Benz Superdome
July 7, 2014	Atlanta	United States	Chastain Park Amphitheater
July 10, 2014	Austin	United States	Austin360 Amphitheater
July 11, 2014	Dallas	United States	Gexa Energy Pavilion
July 12, 2014	The Woodlands	United States	Cynthia Woods Mitchell Pavilion
July 14, 2014	Tampa	United States	MidFlorida Credit Union Amphitheatre
July 15, 2014	West Palm Beach	United States	Cruzan Amphitheatre
July 17, 2014	Charlotte	United States	PNC Music Pavilion
July 19, 2014	Raleigh	United States	Walnut Creek Amphitheatre
July 21, 2014	Vienna	United States	Filene Center
July 22, 2014	Vienna	United States	Filene Center
July 23, 2014	Camden	United States	Susquehanna Bank Center
July 25, 2014	Saratoga Springs	United States	Saratoga Performing Arts Center
July 26, 2014	Uncasville	United States	Mohegan Sun Arena
July 28, 2014	Montreal	Canada	Bell Centre
July 30, 2014	Toronto	Canada	Molson Canadian Amphitheatre
July 31, 2014	London	Canada	Budweiser Gardens
August 2, 2014	Bethel	United States	Bethel Woods Center for the Arts
Europe
February 5, 2015	Amsterdam	Netherlands	Ziggo Dome
February 7, 2015	Oberhausen	Germany	König Pilsener Arena
February 8, 2015	Hanover	Germany	TUI Arena
February 10, 2015	Nuremberg	Germany	Nuremberg Arena
February 11, 2015	Stuttgart	Germany	Hanns-Martin-Schleyer-Halle
February 13, 2015	Milan	Italy	Mediolanum Forum
February 14, 2015	Vienna	Austria	Wiener Stadthalle
February 16, 2015	Frankfurt	Germany	Festhalle Frankfurt
February 17, 2015	Berlin	Germany	O_{2} World
February 19, 2015	Hamburg	Germany	O_{2} World Hamburg
February 21, 2015	Copenhagen	Denmark	Falkonersalen
February 22, 2015	Stockholm	Sweden	Ericsson Globe
February 24, 2015	Cologne	Germany	Lanxess Arena
February 28, 2015	Manchester	England	Manchester Arena
March 1, 2015	London	England	The O_{2} Arena
March 4, 2015	Leeds	England	First Direct Arena
March 6, 2015	Glasgow	Scotland	SSE Hydro
March 7, 2015	Newcastle	England	Metro Radio Arena
March 10, 2015	Belfast	Northern Ireland	Odyssey Arena
March 11, 2015	Dublin	Ireland	3Arena
March 13, 2015	Liverpool	England	Echo Arena Liverpool
March 14, 2015	Birmingham	England	Barclaycard Arena
March 16, 2015	Cardiff	Wales	Motorpoint Arena Cardiff
March 17, 2015	Nottingham	England	Capital FM Arena Nottingham
March 19, 2015	Antwerp	Belgium	Sportpaleis
March 21, 2015	Monaco		Salle des Étoiles
March 23, 2015	Zürich	Switzerland	Hallenstadion
March 24, 2015	Munich	Germany	Olympiahalle
March 26, 2015	Leipzig	Germany	Arena Leipzig
March 27, 2015	Esch-sur-Alzette	Luxembourg	Rockhal
March 29, 2015	Paris	France	Zénith de Paris
March 31, 2015	London	England	The O_{2} Arena
June 19, 2015	Münster	Germany	Schlossplatz
June 22, 2015^{[E]}	Aachen	Germany	Aachener Kurpark
June 25, 2015^{[F]}	London	England	The Great Room at Grosvenor House
June 27, 2015^{[G]}	Cork	Ireland	The Docklands
June 28, 2015^{[H]}	Pilton	England	Worthy Farm
July 1, 2015^{[I]}	Straubing	Germany	Festzelt am Hagen
July 3, 2015^{[J]}	Kestenholz	Germany	Areal der Kapelle St. Peter
July 4, 2015^{[K]}	Potsdam	Germany	Lustgarten
July 7, 2015^{[L]}	Zürich	Switzerland	Dolder Kunsteisbahn
July 9, 2015^{[M]}	Henley-on-Thames	England	Banks of the River Thames
July 11, 2015^{[N]}	Montreux	Switzerland	Auditorium Stravinski
July 12, 2015^{[O]}	Rotterdam	Netherlands	Theater Hal 1
July 15, 2015^{[P]}	Lörrach	Germany	Marktplatz Lörrach
July 16, 2015^{[Q]}	Juan-les-Pins	France	Pinède Gould
July 19, 2015^{[R]}	Carhaix-Plouguer	France	Château de Kerampuil
July 20, 2015^{[S]}	Arcachon	France	Vélodrome d'Arcachon
July 22, 2015	Edinburgh	Scotland	Edinburgh Castle Esplanade
July 24, 2015^{[T]}	Salem	Germany	Schlossgelände
July 25, 2015^{[U]}	Mainz	Germany	Nordmole
July 29, 2015^{[V]}	Marbella	Spain	Auditorio Starlite
July 30, 2015^{[W]}	Oeiras	Portugal	Parque dos Poetas

Festivals and other miscellaneous performances

^{A} This concert was a part of the "Barclays Center Anniversary Celebration"
^{B} This concert was a part of the "Austin City Limits Music Festival"
^{C} This concert was a part of the "Essence Music Festival"
^{D} This concert was a part of "A Day on the Green"
^{E} This concert was a part of the "Kurpark Classix"
^{F} This concert was a part of the "Annual Caudwell Children Butterfly Ball"
^{G} This concert was a part of "Live at the Marquee"
^{H} This concert was a part of the "Glastonbury Festival of Contemporary Performing Arts"
^{I} This concert was a part of "Bluetone: Das Festival an der Donau"
^{J} This concert was a part of "St. Peter at Sunset"
^{K} This concert was a part of "Stadtwerkefest"
^{L} This concert was a part of "Live at Sunset"
^{M} This concert was a part of the "Henley Festival of Music and the Arts"
^{N} This concert was a part of the "Montreux Jazz Festival"
^{O} This concert was a part of the "North Sea Jazz Festival"
^{P} This concert was a part of the "Stimmen-Festival"
^{Q} This concert was a part of "Jazz à Juan"
^{R} This concert was a part of the "Festival des Vieilles Charrues"
^{S} This concert was a part of the "Festival Arcachon en Scène"
^{T} This concert is a part of the "Schloss-Salem-Open-Airs"
^{U} This concert is a part of "Summer in the City"
^{V} This concert is a part of the "Starlite Festival"
^{W} This concert is a part of "EDP Cool Jazz"

Cancellations and rescheduled shows

June 21, 2014	Cuyahoga Falls, Ohio	Blossom Music Center	Cancelled
July 17, 2015	Nîmes, France	Arènes de Nîmes	Cancelled. This concert was a part of the "Festival de Nîmes"

=== Box office score data ===
Venue	City	Tickets sold / available	Gross revenue
Barclays Center	Brooklyn	6,670 / 6,670 (100%)	$693,465
The Colosseum at Caesars Windsor	Windsor	4,737 / 4,934 (96)%	$457,319
Sandalford Wines Estate	Caversham	11,964 / 12,000 (~%100%)	$1,687,633
Adelaide Entertainment Centre	Adelaide	7,790 / 8,002 (97%)	$989,665
Tempus Two Winery Estate	Pokolbin	9,328 / 9,501 (98%)	$1,355,057
Brisbane Entertainment Centre	Brisbane	15,992 / 17,284 (92%)	$2,124,230
Allphones Arena	Sydney	13,297 / 13,297 (100%)	$1,809,005
Rod Laver Arena	Melbourne	23,597 / 23,597 (100%)	$3,298,100
CBS Canterbury Arena	Christchurch	4,976 / 6,843 (73%)	$613,395
TSB Bowl of Brooklands	New Plymouth	6,974 / 7,024 (99%)	$665,676
Vector Arena	Auckland	8,174 / 9,598 (85%)	$888,916
DTE Energy Music Theatre	Clarkston	9,069 / 14,894 (61%)	$361,279
Mohegan Sun Arena	Uncasville	6,571 / 6,571 (100%)	$534,415
Bell Centre	Montreal	9,130 / 9,130 (100%)	$757,399
Budweiser Gardens	London	5,818 / 8,110 (72%)	$354,024
O_{2} World	Berlin	4,664 / 6,922 (67%)	$327,021
O_{2} World Hamburg	Hamburg	7,036 / 12,964 (54%)	$527,374
Manchester Arena	Manchester	15,027 / 15,245 (98%)	$1,385,180
The O_{2} Arena	London	31,863 / 33,004 (96%)	$2,945,050
Sportpaleis	Antwerp	9,899 / 12,819 (77%)	$586,170
Hallenstadion	Zürich	5,468 / 13,000 (42%)	$569,268
TOTAL		218,044 / 251,409 (87%)	$22,929,641
