= List of awards and nominations received by Lionel Richie =

Lionel Richie awards and nominations
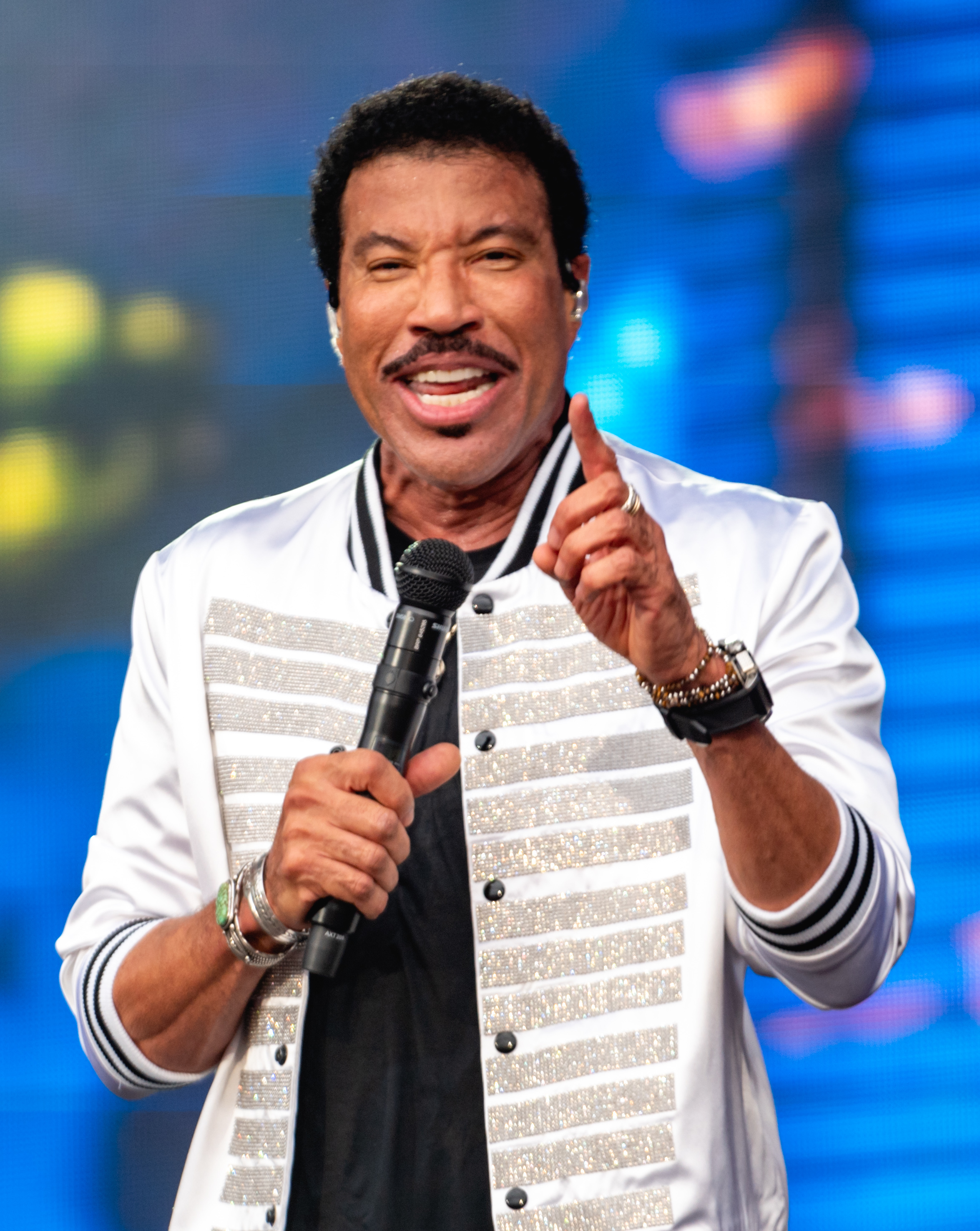
- Richie in 2019
Awards and nominations
Award	Wins	Nominations
Academy Awards	1	3
American Music Awards	10	17
BET Awards	1	1
Billboard Music Awards	0	1
Brit Awards	0	3
Goldene Kamera	1	1
Golden Globe Awards	1	2
Grammy Awards	4	15
MTV Video Music Awards	0	1
Primetime Emmy Awards	0	1

Totals (Note: Certain award groups do not simply award one winner. They acknowledge several different recipients, have runners-up, and have third place. Since this is a specific recognition and is different from losing an award, runner-up mentions are considered wins in this award tally. For simplification and to avoid errors, each award in this list has been presumed to have had a prior nomination.)
- Wins: 21
- Nominations: 48

This article is a list of awards and nominations received by Lionel Richie

Lionel Richie is an American singer who has received numerous accolades including an Academy Award, 11 American Music Awards, four Grammy Awards and a Golden Globe Award as well as nominations for a Primetime Emmy Award and an MTV Video Music Award.

Richie include four Grammy Awards out of 15 nominations. He won his first Grammy for Best Male Pop Vocal Performance for "Truly" (1983). He then won the Grammy Award for Album of the Year for Can't Slow Down and Producer of the Year, Non-Classical (both 1985). The following year he won the Grammy Award for Song of the Year "We Are the World" (1986).

For his work on film he won the Academy Award for Best Original Song and the Golden Globe Award for Best Original Song for "Say You, Say Me" from White Nights (1985). He was Oscar-nominated for "Endless Love" from Endless Love and "Miss Celie's Blues" from The Color Purple.

For his work on television, he was nominated for the Primetime Emmy Award for Outstanding Documentary or Nonfiction Special for the Netflix documentary film The Greatest Night in Pop (2024).

== Major associations ==
=== Academy Awards ===
Year	Category	Nominated work	Result	Ref.
1981	Best Original Song	"Endless Love" (from Endless Love)	Nominated	
1985	Best Original Song	"Say You, Say Me" (from White Nights)	Won	
1985	Best Original Song	"Miss Celie's Blues" (from The Color Purple)	Nominated	

=== Emmy Awards ===
Year	Category	Nominated work	Result	Ref.
2024	Outstanding Documentary or Nonfiction Special	The Greatest Night in Pop	Nominated	

=== Golden Globe Awards ===
Year	Category	Nominated work	Result	Ref.
1981	Best Original Song	"Endless Love" (from Endless Love)	Nominated	
1985	Best Original Song	"Say You, Say Me" (from White Nights)	Won	

=== Grammy Awards ===
Year	Category	Nominated work	Result	Ref.
1979	Song of the Year	"Three Times a Lady" (performed by Commodores)	Nominated	
1981	Song of the Year	"Lady" (performed by Kenny Rogers)	Nominated	
1982	Song of the Year	"Endless Love" (performed by Diana Ross and Richie)	Nominated	
1982	Best Score Soundtrack for Visual Media	Endless Love	Nominated	
1982	Producer of the Year, Non-Classical	Himself	Nominated	
1983	Best Male Pop Vocal Performance	"Truly"	Won	
1984	Song of the Year	"All Night Long (All Night)"	Nominated	
1984	Producer of the Year, Non-Classical	Himself	Nominated	
1985	Song of the Year	"Hello"	Nominated	
1985	Album of the Year	Can't Slow Down	Won	
1985	Producer of the Year, Non-Classical	Himself	Won	
1986	Song of the Year	"We Are the World"	Won	
2002	Best Dance Recording	"Angel"	Nominated	
2007	Best R&B Album	Coming Home	Nominated	
2007	Best Male R&B Vocal Performance	"I Call It Love"	Nominated	

== Miscellaneous awards ==
Organizations	Year	Category	Work	Result	Ref.
American Music Awards	1984	Favorite Pop/Rock Male Artist	Himself	Nominated	
American Music Awards	1984	Favorite Soul/R&B Male Artist	Himself	Nominated	
American Music Awards	1984	Favorite Soul/R&B Album	Lionel Richie	Nominated	
American Music Awards	1984	Favorite Soul/R&B Single	"All Night Long (All Night)"	Won	
American Music Awards	1985	Favorite Pop/Rock Male Artist	Himself	Won	
American Music Awards	1985	Favorite Pop/Rock Male Video Artist	Himself	Won	
American Music Awards	1985	Favorite Soul/R&B Male Artist	Himself	Won	
American Music Awards	1985	Favorite Soul/R&B Male Video Artist	Himself	Won	
American Music Awards	1985	Favorite Pop/Rock Video	"Hello"	Won	
American Music Awards	1985	Favorite Soul/R&B Video	"Hello"	Won	
American Music Awards	1985	Favorite Pop/Rock Album	Can't Slow Down	Nominated	
American Music Awards	1985	Favorite Soul/R&B Album	Can't Slow Down	Nominated	
American Music Awards	1987	Favorite Pop/Rock Male Artist	Himself	Won	
American Music Awards	1987	Favorite Soul/R&B Male Artist	Himself	Won	
American Music Awards	1987	Favorite Soul/R&B Male Video Artist	Himself	Won	
American Music Awards	1987	Favorite Pop/Rock Video	"Dancing on the Ceiling"	Won	
American Music Awards	2012	Favorite Country Album	Tuskegee	Nominated	
Billboard Music Awards	2013	Top Country Album	Tuskegee	Nominated	
Brit Awards	1984	Best International Solo Artist	Himself	Nominated	
Brit Awards	1985	Best International Solo Artist	Himself	Nominated	
Brit Awards	1986	Best International Solo Artist	Himself	Nominated	
MTV Video Music Awards	1984	Best Male Video	"All Night Long (All Night)"	Nominated	
NAACP Image Awards	1989	Entertainer of the Year	Himself	Won	

== Honorary awards ==
Organizations	Year	Accolade	Result	Ref.
Academy of Achievement	1985	Honorary Awards	Honored	
BET Awards	2014	Lifetime Achievement Award	Honored	
Goldene Kamera	2007	Music International Lifetime Achievement	Honored	
Rock & Roll Hall of Fame	2022	Inductee	Honored	
TV Land Award	2008	Music Icon	Honored	
