= All the Hits Tour (Lionel Richie and Mariah Carey) =

2017 concert tour by Lionel Richie and Mariah Carey

- Tour by Lionel Richie and Mariah Carey
- Start date: July 21, 2017
- End date: September 5, 2017
- Legs: 1
- No. of shows: 22 in North America
- Attendance: 223,665 (84%)
- Box office: $17,498,049
Lionel Richie tour chronology
All the Hits, All Night Long (2013–15)	All the Hits Tour (2017)	Hello! Hits Tour (2019)
Mariah Carey concert chronology
The Sweet Sweet Fantasy Tour (2016)	All the Hits Tour (2017)	The Butterfly Returns (2018–20)

The All the Hits Tour was a 2017 summer concert tour by American singer-songwriters Lionel Richie and Mariah Carey. The tour was scheduled to begin on March 15, 2017, at the Royal Farms Arena in Baltimore. The tour was delayed due to Richie's longer than expected recovery from a knee procedure and began in summer 2017.

== Set list ==
=== Mariah Carey ===
1. "Love Hangover"
2. "Heartbreaker" (Diva Remix)
3. "Shake It Off"
4. "Touch My Body"
5. "I Know What You Want"
6. "My All"
7. "Always Be My Baby"
8. "Don't Forget About Us"
9. "One Sweet Day" (With Daniel Moore II and Trey Lorenz)
10. "All I Do" (Interlude) (Performed by Trey Lorenz)
11. "It's Like That" (contains elements of "Hollis Crew" and "Sucker M.C.'s")
12. "Vision of Love"
13. "We Belong Together"
14. "All I Want for Christmas Is You" (acapella)
15. "Hero"
16. "Hero Reprise" (Outro)

=== Lionel Richie ===
1. "Easy"
2. "My Love"
3. "Running with the Night"
4. "Penny Lover"
5. "Truly"
6. "You Are"
7. "Stuck on You"
8. "Dancing on the Ceiling"
9. "Three Times a Lady"
10. "Sail On"
11. "Fancy Dancer"
12. "Sweet Love"
13. "Lady (You Bring Me Up)"
14. "Just to Be Close to You"
15. "Brick House"
16. "Fire"
17. "Hello"
18. "Say You, Say Me"
19. "We Are the World"
20. "All Night Long (All Night)"

=== Notes ===
Carey stated that she would arrange her set list differently each night for her fans who have seen her shows before. The following are the changes made:

- "All I Want for Christmas Is You" was only performed in Oakland.
- Starting on July 30, "Heat" and "I'm That Chick" were added to Carey's set list, and "Shake It Off" was no longer performed.
- "My All" was not performed in Sacramento, Sunrise and Tampa.
- On select dates, "One Sweet Day" and "Love Hangover" were not performed.
- "Vision of Love" was not performed in San Diego.
- "Touch My Body" was not performed in Sunrise.
- "Emotions" was performed in Duluth.
- "Forever" and "U Make Me Wanna" were performed in Kansas City.

== Tour dates ==
List of concerts, showing date, city, country, venue, opening act, tickets sold, number of available tickets and amount of gross revenue
Date	City	Country	Venue	Opening act	Attendance	Revenue
North America
July 21, 2017	Oakland	United States	Oracle Arena	Tauren Wells	11,591 / 12,126 (95%)	$951,858
July 22, 2017	Sacramento	United States	Golden 1 Center	Tauren Wells	12,506 / 12,977 (96%)	$719,584
July 27, 2017	San Diego	United States	Viejas Arena	Tauren Wells	6,628 / 8,314 (79%)	$571,339
July 30, 2017	Anaheim	United States	Honda Center	Tauren Wells	11,566 / 14,287 (80%)	$1,061,089
July 31, 2017	Los Angeles	United States	Hollywood Bowl	Tauren Wells	15,800 / 17,322 (91%)	$1,574,180
August 3, 2017	Dallas	United States	American Airlines Center	Tauren Wells	8,095 / 8,095 (100%)	$670,231
August 4, 2017	Houston	United States	Toyota Center	Tauren Wells	9,359 / 10,952 (85%)	$829,273
August 6, 2017	New Orleans	United States	Smoothie King Center	Tauren Wells	7,772 / 11,917 (65%)	$618,904
August 10, 2017	Sunrise	United States	BB&T Center	Tauren Wells	10,413 / 13,206 (78%)	$885,714
August 11, 2017	Tampa	United States	Amalie Arena	Tauren Wells	10,845 / 12,477 (86%)	$853,015
August 13, 2017	Duluth	United States	Infinite Energy Arena	Tauren Wells	7,974 / 8,635 (92%)	$646,769
August 16, 2017	Philadelphia	United States	Wells Fargo Center	Tauren Wells	9,200 / 14,612 (62%)	$622,386
August 18, 2017	Newark	United States	Prudential Center	Tauren Wells	9,521 / 13,503 (70%)	$631,294
August 19, 2017	New York City	United States	Madison Square Garden	Tauren Wells	14,379 / 14,505 (99%)	$1,168,544
August 22, 2017	Boston	United States	TD Garden	Tauren Wells	10,192 / 13,264 (76%)	$947,678
August 24, 2017	Toronto	Canada	Air Canada Centre	Tauren Wells	13,810 / 13,810 (100%)	$1,081,570
August 26, 2017	Chicago	United States	United Center	Tauren Wells	12,692 / 14,859 (85%)	$958,743
August 27, 2017	Kansas City	United States	Sprint Center	Tauren Wells	9,264 / 11,801 (78%)	$646,490
August 29, 2017	Denver	United States	Pepsi Center	Tauren Wells	8,773 / 13,279 (66%)	$527,074
September 1, 2017	Edmonton	Canada	Rogers Place	Tauren Wells	—N/a	—N/a
September 3, 2017	Vancouver	Canada	Rogers Arena	Tauren Wells	13,628 / 13,914 (97%)	$820,386
September 5, 2017	Seattle	United States	KeyArena	Tauren Wells	9,617 / 11,441 (84%)	$711,998
Total					223,665 / 265,296 (84%)	$17,498,049

== Cancelled shows ==
List of cancelled concerts, showing date, city, country, venue and reason for cancellation
Date	City	Country	Venue	Reason
March 15, 2017	Baltimore	United States	Royal Farms Arena	Richie's longer-than-expected recovery from knee surgery.
March 21, 2017	Pittsburgh	United States	PPG Paints Arena	Richie's longer-than-expected recovery from knee surgery.
March 24, 2017	Saint Paul	United States	Xcel Energy Center	Richie's longer-than-expected recovery from knee surgery.
March 28, 2017	Grand Rapids	United States	Van Andel Arena	Richie's longer-than-expected recovery from knee surgery.
April 5, 2017	Cleveland	United States	Quicken Loans Arena	Richie's longer-than-expected recovery from knee surgery.
April 7, 2017	Uniondale	United States	Nassau Veterans Memorial Coliseum	Richie's longer-than-expected recovery from knee surgery.
April 11, 2017	Auburn Hills	United States	The Palace of Auburn Hills	Richie's longer-than-expected recovery from knee surgery.
April 14, 2017	Columbus	United States	Schottenstein Center	Richie's longer-than-expected recovery from knee surgery.
April 18, 2017	St. Louis	United States	Scottrade Center	Richie's longer-than-expected recovery from knee surgery.
April 21, 2017	Tulsa	United States	BOK Center	Richie's longer-than-expected recovery from knee surgery.
April 25, 2017	Salt Lake City	United States	Vivint Smart Home Arena	Richie's longer-than-expected recovery from knee surgery.
May 20, 2017	Nashville	United States	Bridgestone Arena	Richie's longer-than-expected recovery from knee surgery.
May 21, 2017	Charlotte	United States	Spectrum Center	Richie's longer-than-expected recovery from knee surgery.
