= Deep River Woman =

1986 single by Lionel Richie and Alabama

Single by Lionel Richie with Alabama

from the album Dancing on the Ceiling
- A-side: "Ballerina Girl"
- Released: November 1986
- Genre: Country pop
- Length: 4:35
- Label: Motown
- Songwriter(s): Lionel Richie
- Producer(s): Lionel Richie; James Anthony Carmichael

Lionel Richie singles chronology
"Love Will Conquer All" (1986)	"Deep River Woman" (1986)	"Se La" (1987)

Alabama singles chronology
"Touch Me When We're Dancing" (1986)	"Deep River Woman" (1986)	""You've Got" the Touch" (1986)

"Deep River Woman" is a song written by American R&B artist Lionel Richie and recorded by Richie with American country music band Alabama. It was released in November 1986 as the fourth single from Richie's album Dancing on the Ceiling as double A-side with "Ballerina Girl". The song peaked at number 10 on the Billboard Hot Country Singles chart and number 71 on the Hot 100.

== Chart performance ==
Chart (1986–1987)	Peak position
US Billboard Hot 100	71
US Adult Contemporary (Billboard)	28
US Hot Country Songs (Billboard)	10
Canadian RPM Country Tracks	10

== Cover versions ==
On Richie's 2012 duets album, Tuskegee, he re-recorded the song with Little Big Town. It charted on the Hot Country Songs chart from unsolicited airplay at number 60 for the week of June 16, 2012, spending only one week on the chart.
