= Tuskegee (album) =

Studio album by Lionel Richie
- Released: March 5, 2012
- Recorded: 2010−2011
- Genres: Pop; country; R&B
- Length: 59:10
- Label: Mercury
- Producers: Tony Brown; Buddy Cannon; Nathan Chapman; Kenny Chesney; Dann Huff

Lionel Richie chronology
Just Go (2009)	Tuskegee (2012)

Tuskegee is the eleventh studio album by American singer Lionel Richie, released on March 5, 2012, by Mercury Records. The album consists entirely of reinterpretations of previously released songs by Richie, each performed with a different guest artist, all of which are stars in the country music genre. Tuskegee is named after the Alabama city where Richie was born and later completed his undergraduate degree at Tuskegee Institute.

The album became Richie's third number-one album on the Billboard 200 and his first since Dancing on the Ceiling in 1986. Tuskegee also became Richie's first album to sell more than a million copies in the United States since Dancing on the Ceiling.

== Critical reception ==
Professional ratings
Aggregate scores
Source	Rating
Metacritic	74/100
Review scores
Source	Rating
About.com	3/5 stars
AllMusic	3/5 stars
Country Weekly	5/5 stars
Entertainment Weekly	A−
Los Angeles Times	2/4 stars
Rolling Stone	3/5 stars
Taste of Country	4/5 stars

At Metacritic, which assigns a normalized rating out of 100 to reviews from mainstream critics, Tuskegee has an average score of 74 based on 8 reviews, indicating "generally favorable reviews". Boston Globe critic Sarah Rodman called Tuskegee an "enjoyably sunny new album", writing that "while it would be easy to dismiss this as calculated – which it is – Richie and his guests are having such a good time and the songs themselves are so irresistible it's easy (like a Sunday morning) to get caught up in the spirit." Nate Chinen called Tuskegee a "sleek, sure-footed new country duets album". He wrote that "Richie sounds terrific: easeful and soulful, if no longer exactly youthful. The characteristic smoothness of his delivery makes him both an approachable partner and a malleable backup singer."

Mikael Wood from Entertainment Weekly felt that "it's still gratifying to see how many A-list Nashville stars lined up for guest spots on Tuskegee—Sheldon! Tim! Shania! Willie!—and to hear how naturally the Alabama native countrifies R&B classics like 'Endless Love' and the Jennifer Nettles-assisted 'Hello'". Rolling Stone critic Rob Tannenbaum remarked that "these collaborations jell because Richie's style is so expansive, musically and emotionally." BBC Music critic Lloyd Bradley noted that whether "the album is enough to please hard core country fans is not really the point here – Richie's post-Commodores output was largely ignored by soul fans. He's a pop artist of substance, and as such brings a touch of class and sufficient flavour of another genre to the mainstream to make music that's interesting and lasting."

Los Angeles Times journalist Randy Lewis felt that while "Richie still never really steps away from the polished sheen that characterized his musical heyday, [his] recordings were always among the fluffier hits of the time, anyway, never seriously challenging Prince or Michael Jackson among R&B-rooted pop innovators, and now he's not giving Hank, Merle or Johnny anything to fret about either." Allmusic editor Stephen Thomas Erlewine found that "even if the production has changed – it's not as glossy as the '80s, there are fewer keyboards and more guitars – the sensibility remains the same, so Tuskegee generates a bit of déjà vu: the surroundings are new, yet everything feels familiar. Whether that's a comfortable bit of nostalgia or just a shade too predictable depends entirely on the tastes of the listener."

== Promotion ==
"Endless Love" featuring singer Shania Twain was released as the album's lead single in the United States on February 7, 2012. In Denmark, "Say You, Say Me" featuring Rasmus Seebach was released as the first single on February 22, 2012. Four promotion singles — "Easy" featuring Willie Nelson, "Just for You" featuring Billy Currington, "Stuck on You" featuring Darius Rucker, and "Hello" featuring Jennifer Nettles — were released in advance of the album.

Although it was not released as a single, "Deep River Woman" featuring Little Big Town, charted on the Billboard Hot Country Songs chart from unsolicited airplay and reached a peak of number 60. It was also the only song from the album to make an appearance on the chart, though the album's lead single, "Endless Love", was a Top 20 hit on the Adult Contemporary chart.

== Commercial performance ==
Tuskegee debuted in the United States at number two on the Billboard 200 behind Madonna's MDNA (2012). It sold 199,000 copies in its first week, becoming Lionel Richie's best sales week since Nielsen SoundScan began tracking sales data in 1991. The following week the album sold 95,000 copies and fell two places to number four. In its third week on the chart Tuskegee rose to number one, selling 129,000 copies, while making Tuskegee Richie's third number-one album as well as his first since Dancing on the Ceiling (1986). Tuskegee was certified platinum by the Recording Industry Association of America (RIAA) on May 3, 2012, for shipments of one million units in the US. As of December 2012, it has sold 1,071,000 copies.

In the United Kingdom, the album debuted at number seven on the UK Albums Chart with first-week sales of 19,320 copies. It is Lionel Richie's eleventh top 10 album there. In Canada, the album debuted at number one on the Canadian Albums Chart, selling 18,000 copies.

== Track listing ==
All tracks written by Lionel Richie, with additional writers noted.

=== North American edition ===
Tuskegee track listing
No.	Title	Writer(s)	Producer(s)	Length
1.	"You Are" (with Blake Shelton)	Brenda Harvey Richie	Tony Brown; Richie	5:00
2.	"Say You, Say Me" (with Jason Aldean)		Brown; Richie	5:09
3.	"Stuck on You" (with Darius Rucker)		Brown; Richie	3:21
4.	"Deep River Woman" (with Little Big Town)		Brown; Richie	4:09
5.	"My Love" (with Kenny Chesney)		Buddy Cannon; Chesney; Richie	5:33
6.	"Dancing on the Ceiling" (with Rascal Flatts)	Carlos Rios; Michael Frenchik	Dann Huff; Richie	4:20
7.	"Hello" (with Jennifer Nettles)		Nathan Chapman; Richie	4:30
8.	"Sail On" (with Tim McGraw)		Brown; Richie	5:05
9.	"Endless Love" (with Shania Twain)		Chapman; Richie	4:19
10.	"Just for You" (with Billy Currington)	Paul Barry; Mark Taylor	Huff; Richie	4:11
11.	"Lady" (with Kenny Rogers)		Brown; Richie	4:09
12.	"Easy" (with Willie Nelson)		Brown; Richie	4:30
13.	"All Night Long" (with Jimmy Buffett and Coral Reefer Band)		Brown; Richie	4:57

Australian edition additional track
No.	Title	Writer(s)	Producer(s)	Length
14.	"Angel" (with Pixie Lott)	Barry; Taylor	Brown; Richie	5:01

Home Shopping Network additional CD
No.	Title	Writer(s)	Producer(s)	Length
1.	"You Are" (Live at Wembley Arena)	Harvey Richie
2.	"Say You, Say Me"		Richie; James Anthony Carmichael	4:03
3.	"My Love"		Richie; Carmichael	4:08
4.	"Dancing on the Ceiling"	Rios; Frenchik	Richie; Carmichael	4:21
5.	"Stuck on You"		Richie; Carmichael	3:10

=== British edition ===
No.	Title	Writer(s)	Producer(s)	Length
1.	"You Are" (with Blake Shelton)	Harvey Richie	Brown; Richie	5:01
2.	"Say You, Say Me" (with Rasmus Seebach)		Brown; Richie	5:08
3.	"Stuck on You" (with Darius Rucker)		Brown; Richie	3:19
4.	"Deep River Woman" (with Little Big Town)		Brown; Richie	4:08
5.	"My Love" (with Kenny Chesney)		Cannon; Chesney; Richie	5:34
6.	"Dancing on the Ceiling" (with Rascal Flatts)	Rios; Frenchik	Huff; Richie	4:17
7.	"Hello" (with Jennifer Nettles)		Chapman; Richie	4:28
8.	"Sail On" (with Jill Johnson)		Brown; Richie	5:04
9.	"Endless Love" (with Shania Twain)		Chapman; Richie	4:19
10.	"Just for You" (with Billy Currington)	Barry; Taylor	Huff; Richie	4:11
11.	"Lady" (with Kenny Rogers)		Brown; Richie	4:09
12.	"Easy" (with Willie Nelson)		Brown; Richie	4:29
13.	"All Night Long" (with Jimmy Buffett and Coral Reefer Band)		Brown; Richie	4:57
14.	"Angel" (with Pixie Lott)	Barry; Taylor	Brown; Richie	5:01

Deluxe edition additional tracks
No.	Title	Producer(s)	Length
15.	"Say You, Say Me" (with Jason Aldean)	Brown; Richie	5:08
16.	"Sail On" (with Tim McGraw)	Brown; Richie	5:04

- The deluxe edition includes a bonus DVD featuring the making of the record, artist interviews and behind the scenes footage.

=== Dutch edition ===
No.	Title	Writer(s)	Producer(s)	Length
1.	"You Are" (with Blake Shelton)	Harvey Richie	Brown; Richie	5:01
2.	"Say You, Say Me" (with Rasmus Seebach)		Brown; Richie	5:08
3.	"Stuck on You" (with Darius Rucker)		Brown; Richie	3:19
4.	"Deep River Woman" (with Little Big Town)		Brown; Richie	4:08
5.	"My Love" (with Kenny Chesney)		Cannon; Chesney; Richie	5:34
6.	"Dancing on the Ceiling" (with Rascal Flatts featuring Stefanie Heinzmann)	Rios; Frenchik	Huff; Richie	4:17
7.	"Hello" (with Jennifer Nettles)		Chapman; Richie	4:28
8.	"Sail On" (with Jill Johnson)		Brown; Richie	5:04
9.	"Endless Love" (with Shania Twain)		Chapman; Richie	4:19
10.	"Just for You" (with Billy Currington)	Barry; Taylor	Huff; Richie	4:11
11.	"Lady" (with Kenny Rogers)		Brown; Richie	4:09
12.	"Easy" (with Willie Nelson)		Brown; Richie	4:29
13.	"All Night Long" (with Jimmy Buffett and Coral Reefer Band)		Brown; Richie	4:57
14.	"Angel" (with Cassandra Steen)	Barry; Taylor	Brown; Richie	5:01

Deluxe edition additional DVD
No.	Title	Writer(s)	Producer(s)	Length
1.	"You Are" (with Blake Shelton)	Harvey Richie	Tony Brown and Lionel Richie	5:01
2.	"Say You, Say Me" (with Rasmus Seebach)		Tony Brown and Lionel Richie	5:08
3.	"Stuck on You" (with Darius Rucker)		Tony Brown and Lionel Richie	3:19
4.	"Deep River Woman" (with Little Big Town)		Tony Brown and Lionel Richie	4:08
5.	"My Love" (with Kenny Chesney)		Buddy Cannon, Kenny Chesney and Lionel Richie	5:34
6.	"Dancing on the Ceiling" (with Rascall Flatts)	Rios, Frenchik	Dann Huff and Lionel Richie	4:17
7.	"Hello" (with Jennifer Nettles)		Nathan Chapman and Lionel Richie	4:28
8.	"Sail On" (with Jill Johnson)		Tony Brown and Lionel Richie	5:04
9.	"Endless Love" (with Shania Twain)		Nathan Chapman and Lionel Richie	4:19
10.	"Just for You" (with Billy Currington)	Barry, Taylor	Dann Huff and Lionel Richie	4:11
11.	"Lady" (with Kenny Rogers)		Tony Brown and Lionel Richie	4:09
12.	"Easy" (with Willie Nelson)		Tony Brown and Lionel Richie	4:29
13.	"All Night Long" (with Jimmy Buffett and Coral Reefer Band)		Tony Brown and Lionel Richie	4:57

== Personnel ==
Performers and musicians

- Jason Aldean – vocals (track 2)
- Coral Reefer Band – various instruments (track 13)
- Jimmy Buffett – vocals (track 13), electric guitar (track 13)
- Tom Bukovac – guitar (tracks 1 to 4, 8, 10 to 14)
- Buddy Cannon – backing vocals (track 5)
- Chris Carmichael – strings, string arrangement (track 2)
- Kenny Chesney – vocals (track 5)
- Perry Coleman – backing vocals (tracks 1 to 4, 8, 11 to 14)
- Chad Cromwell – drums (tracks 1 to 4, 7 to 9, 11 to 14)
- Billy Currington – vocals (track 10)
- Jay DeMarcus – backing vocals (track 6), bass guitar (track 6)
- Joe Don Rooney – backing vocals (track 6), electric guitar (track 6)
- Dan Dugmore – steel guitar (tracks 1 to 4, 8, 11 to 14)
- Karen Fairchild – backing vocals (track 4)
- Paul Franklin – steel guitar (tracks 1 to 4, 8, 10 to 14)
- Kenny Greenberg – guitar (tracks 1 to 4, 8, 11 to 14)
- John Jorgenson – electric guitar (track 5)
- Robert Greenidge – steel drums (tracks 1 to 4, 8, 11 to 14)
- Doyle Grisham – steel guitar (tracks 1 to 4, 8, 11 to 14)
- Tina Gullickson – backing vocals (tracks 1 to 4, 8, 11 to 14)
- Roger Guth – drums (tracks 1 to 4, 8, 11 to 14)
- Kim Keyes – backing vocals (tracks 1 to 4, 8, 11 to 14)
- John Jarvis – keyboards (tracks 1 to 4, 8, 11 to 14)
- Gary LeVox – vocals (track 6)
- John Lovell – trumpet (tracks 1 to 4, 8, 11 to 14)
- Pixie Lott – vocals (track 14)
- Mac McAnally – guitar (tracks 1 to 4, 8, 11 to 14), backing vocals (tracks 1 to 4, 8, 11 to 14)
- Ralph MacDonald – percussion (tracks 1 to 4, 8, 11 to 14)
- Jim Mayer – bass (tracks 1 to 4, 8, 11 to 14), backing vocals (tracks 1 to 4, 8, 11 to 14)
- Peter Mayer – guitar (tracks 1 to 4, 8, 11 to 14), backing vocals (tracks 1 to 4, 8, 11 to 14)
- Tim McGraw – vocals (track 8)
- Gordon Mote – keyboards (tracks 1 to 4, 8, 11 to 14)
- Steve Nathan – keyboards (tracks 1 to 4, 8, 11 to 14)
- Willie Nelson – vocals (track 12), guitar (tracks 1 to 4, 8, 11 to 14)
- Jennifer Nettles – vocals (track 7)
- Mickey Raphael – harmonica (tracks 1 to 4, 8, 11 to 14)
- Michael Rhodes – bass (tracks 1 to 4, 8, 11 to 14)
- Lionel Richie – vocals (all tracks), keyboards (tracks 1 to 4, 8, 11 to 14)
- Chris Rodriguez – backing vocals (tracks 1 to 4, 8, 11 to 14)
- Kenny Rogers – vocals (track 11)
- Darius Rucker – vocals (track 3)
- Kimberly Schlapman – backing vocals (track 4)
- Nadirah Shakoor – backing vocals (tracks 1 to 4, 8, 11 to 14)
- Blake Shelton – vocals (track 1)
- Jimmie Lee Sloas – bass (tracks 1 to 4, 6, 8, 10 to 14)
- Phillip Sweet – backing vocals (track 4)
- Ilya Toshinsky – guitar (tracks 1 to 4, 8, 11 to 14)
- Shania Twain – vocals (track 9)
- Michael Utley – keyboards (tracks 1 to 4, 8, 11 to 14)
- Jimi Westbrook – vocals (track 4)
- John Willis – acoustic guitar (track 5)

== Charts ==
=== Weekly charts ===
Weekly chart performance for Tuskegee
Chart (2012)	Peak position
Australian Albums (ARIA)	2
Austrian Albums (Ö3 Austria)	9
Belgian Albums (Ultratop Flanders)	5
Belgian Albums (Ultratop Wallonia)	74
Canadian Albums (Billboard)	1
Danish Albums (Hitlisten)	2
Dutch Albums (Album Top 100)	7
French Albums (SNEP)	134
German Albums (Offizielle Top 100)	7
Irish Albums (IRMA)	42
Italian Albums (FIMI)	52
New Zealand Albums (RMNZ)	6
Norwegian Albums (VG-lista)	26
Scottish Albums (Official Charts)	8
Spanish Albums (Promusicae)	71
Swedish Albums (Sverigetopplistan)	10
Swiss Albums (Schweizer Hitparade)	31
UK Albums (Official Charts)	7
US Billboard 200	1
US Top Country Albums (Billboard)	1

=== Year-end charts ===
2012 yearly chart performance for Tuskegee
Chart (2012)	Position
Australian Albums (ARIA)	77
Canadian Albums (Billboard)	23
Dutch Albums (Album Top 100)	75
US Billboard 200	9
US Top Country Albums (Billboard)	3

2013 yearly chart performance for Tuskegee
Chart (2013)	Position
US Top Country Albums (Billboard)	57

=== Decade-end charts ===
Chart (2010–2019)	Position
US Billboard 200	118

== Certifications ==
Certifications for Tuskegee
Region	Certification	Certified units/sales
Australia (ARIA)	Gold	35,000^{^}
Canada (Music Canada)	Platinum	80,000^{^}
Denmark (IFPI Danmark)	Gold	10,000^{^}
United Kingdom (BPI)	Gold	100,000^{‡}
United States (RIAA)	Platinum	1,071,000
Summaries
Worldwide (2012)	—	1,500,000
^{^} Shipments figures based on certification alone.^{‡} Sales+streaming figures based on certification alone.

== Release history ==
Release history of Tuskegee
Region	Date	Format(s)	Label
Denmark	March 5, 2012	CD; digital download	Mercury; Universal
United Kingdom	March 5, 2012	CD; digital download	Mercury; Universal
United States	March 26, 2012	CD; digital download	Universal Music Nashville
