= Dancing on the Ceiling =

1986 studio album by Lionel Richie

Studio album by Lionel Richie
- Released: August 5, 1986
- Recorded: 1985–1986
- Studios: Ocean Way (Hollywood); Hitsville U.S.A. (Los Angeles); Tarpan (San Rafael, California); Bear Creek (Woodinville, Washington); The Music Mill (Nashville)
- Genres: Pop; R&B
- Length: 46:27
- Label: Motown
- Producers: Lionel Richie; James Anthony Carmichael; Narada Michael Walden

Lionel Richie chronology
| Can't Slow Down (1983) | Dancing on the Ceiling (1986) | Back to Front (1992) |

Singles from Dancing on the Ceiling
- 1. "Say You, Say Me" Released: October 1985; 2. "Dancing on the Ceiling" Released: July 1986; 3. "Love Will Conquer All" Released: September 1986; 4. "Ballerina Girl" / "Deep River Woman" Released: November 1986; 5. "Se La" Released: March 1987

Dancing on the Ceiling is the third solo studio album by American singer Lionel Richie, released by Motown on August 5, 1986. The album was originally to be titled Say You, Say Me, after the Academy Award-winning track of the same name, but it was renamed after Richie rewrote several songs for the album. Released to generally positive reviews, the album – Richie's second with session guitarist Carlos Rios – topped the US Billboard 200 chart, selling 4 million copies. Following Dancing on the Ceiling and the consequent Outrageous tour, Richie went on a long hiatus, not releasing an album of entirely new material for another ten years.

== Background and recording ==
Richie rose to prominence as a member of the Commodores in the late 1970s, but after tensions arose in the band, he left in 1982. His first two solo albums were runaway successes: Lionel Richie (1982) sold 4 million copies, while Can't Slow Down (1983) sold 10 million, and won the Grammy Award for Album of the Year.

Recording for Dancing on the Ceiling began in 1985. "Say You, Say Me" was used in that year's film White Nights for which it had won an Academy Award for Best Original Song and a Golden Globe Award for Best Original Song. Work on the album was done while Richie was finalizing his work with "We Are the World".

During early production, the album was intended to be titled Say You, Say Me and released in December 1985. However, Richie found that he did not "want to do those songs" owing to the social conditions he saw, and began rewriting it "to express what [he] felt the world was boxing itself into". Ultimately, the album's title was changed to Dancing on the Ceiling, as the titular song was Richie's next single. Recording for the album took over a year and a half, and Richie stated that he tried to include a mixture of sounds.

== Reception ==
Professional ratings
Review scores
| Source | Rating |
|---|---|
| AllMusic | 4/5 stars |
| The Village Voice | B+ |
| The Washington Post | (mixed) |

Dancing on the Ceiling has generally received positive reviews. Anthony Decurtis, reviewing in Rolling Stone, gave the album a positive review, writing that it "sets an impressive standard for mainstream pop craft", encompassing Richie's "finest qualities". He especially praised the track "Say You, Say Me", but found "Ballerina Girl" a "virtual anthology of Richie's worst saccharine excesses". Los Angeles Times critic Robert Hilburn found that "We Are the World" had left Richie "with a deeper sense of social purpose, and his attempts to infuse that sense into his traditional approach brings a tension to the new album that makes Dancing on the Ceiling his most satisfying collection."

Robert Christgau of The Village Voice ranked the album a B+. He found that it provided "lulling, almost mantralike entertainment" with "a knack for tune that puts [Richie] over the fine line between lulling and boring". His criticism centered on "Ballerina" for its mawkishness and lack of interest in some of the faster songs. Meanwhile, Stephen Thomas Erlewine of AllMusic retrospectively gave Dancing on the Ceiling four out of five stars, summarizing the album as "a solid, enjoyable affair" but a "comedown" after Richie's previous albums, with its songs generally longer than necessary and the lyrics mixing "silliness ... and sappiness".

== Chart performance ==
The album sold 4 million copies in the US and it became the first album to be simultaneously certified gold, platinum, double platinum, and triple platinum by the Recording Industry Association of America since the institution established double platinum in 1984. In South Africa, initial shipments were 60,000 prerelease units. To promote the album Richie went on a 40-city concert tour, entitled "Outrageous". The first concert was in Phoenix, Arizona.

Dancing on the Ceiling peaked at No.1 on the US Billboard Hot 200. The title track was the album's second biggest single, reaching No.2 in the US and No.7 in the UK Singles Chart, falling behind "Say You, Say Me"'s earlier performance. Other Top 10 singles from the album include "Love Will Conquer All" (US No.9, UK No.45) and "Ballerina Girl" (US No.7, UK No.17). Meanwhile, "Deep River Woman" reached No.10 on Billboard's Hot Country Singles chart.

== Legacy ==
Following the success of Dancing on the Ceiling, Richie withdrew almost entirely from the music industry for six years, which Steve Huey of AllMusic suggests was "quitting while he was ahead". He released a compilation album – with some new material – entitled Back to Front in 1992, with his first all-new release, Louder Than Words, following in 1996. As of 2013, none of his successive albums have been as successful as Lionel Richie, Can't Slow Down, and Dancing on the Ceiling. A remastered edition of Dancing on the Ceiling was released in 2003, featuring four bonus tracks.

== Track listing ==
All tracks are written by Lionel Richie, except where noted. All tracks are produced by Lionel Richie and James Anthony Carmichael, except "Night Train (Smooth Alligator)," produced by Narada Michael Walden.

Side one
| No. | Title | Music | Length |
|---|---|---|---|
| 1. | "Dancing on the Ceiling" | Richie; Carlos Rios; Michael Frenchik | 4:30 |
| 2. | "Se La" | Richie; Greg Phillinganes | 5:22 |
| 3. | "Ballerina Girl" | | 3:38 |
| 4. | "Don't Stop" | Richie; John Barnes | 7:43 |

Side two
| No. | Title | Lyrics | Music | Length |
|---|---|---|---|---|
| 5. | "Deep River Woman" | | | 4:35 |
| 6. | "Love Will Conquer All" | Richie; Cynthia Weil | Richie; Phillinganes | 5:40 |
| 7. | "Tonight Will Be Alright" | | | 5:06 |
| 8. | "Say You, Say Me" | | | 4:00 |
| Total length: | | | | 40:32 |

CD/cassette bonus track
| No. | Title | Lyrics | Music | Length |
|---|---|---|---|---|
| 9. | "Night Train (Smooth Alligator)" | Jeffrey Cohen; Ray St. John | Walden; Preston Glass; Walter Afanasieff; Sade; St. John | 4:59 |
| Total length: | | | | 46:54 |

2003 reissue bonus tracks
| No. | Title | Lyrics | Music | Length |
|---|---|---|---|---|
| 10. | "Dancing on the Ceiling" (12" version) | | Richie; Rios; Frenchik | 7:10 |
| 11. | "Se La" (12" remix by Steve Thompson & Michael Barbiero) | | Richie; Phillinganes | 8:12 |
| 12. | "Don't Stop" | | Richie; Barnes | 9:40 |
| 13. | "Love Will Conquer All" (Remix by Shep Pettibone) | Richie; Weil | Richie; Phillinganes | 7:01 |
| Total length: | | | | 79:01 |

== Personnel ==
Credits lifted from the album's liner notes.

Musicians

- Lionel Richie – vocals, keyboards (6–8), drum machine (6)
- John Barnes – acoustic piano (1), Synclavier programming (4), additional synthesizers (4), additional synthesizer programming (4)
- Michael Boddicker – synthesizers (1–3, 5–9)
- Carlos Rios – synthesizers (1), guitar solo (1), guitars (1, 2, 7), acoustic guitar (8)
- Steve MacMillan – door creek effects (1)
- Ken Caillat – sound effects (1)
- Tom Jones – sound effects (1)
- Greg Phillinganes – keyboards (2, 5, 7, 8), synthesizers (2, 6), drum machine (2, 6), Minimoog bass (8)
- Michael Lang – keyboards (3)
- Neil Larsen – keyboards (3)
- Preston Glass – synthesizers (9)
- Cory Lerios – synthesizers (9)
- Tim May – guitars (3, 5, 7, 8)
- Charles Fearing – guitars (4)
- Louis Shelton – guitar solo (5)
- David Cochrane – guitars (6)
- Eric Clapton – guitar solo (7)
- Steve Lukather – guitars (8)
- Vernon "Ice" Black – guitars (9), guitar solo (9)
- Neil Stubenhaus – bass (1)
- Nathan East – bass (2, 3, 6)
- Joe Chemay – bass (5, 7)
- Abraham Laboriel – bass (8)
- Randy Jackson – bass (9)
- John Robinson – drums (1, 8)
- Paul Leim – drums (2, 3, 5–7), drum machine (8), additional drums (9)
- Narada Michael Walden – drums (9), drum programming (9)
- Paulinho da Costa – percussion (2, 4, 6–9)
- Sheila E. – percussion (4)

Music arrangements

- James Anthony Carmichael – horn arrangements (1, 7), rhythm arrangements (1–3, 5–8), string arrangements (3, 5, 8)
- Lionel Richie – rhythm arrangements (1–3, 5–8), vocal arrangements (1–8), choir arrangements (2), arrangements (4)
- Carlos Rios – rhythm arrangements (1)
- Greg Phillinganes – rhythm arrangements (2, 6)
- John Barnes – arrangements (4)
- Narada Michael Walden – arrangements (9), vocal arrangements (9)

Background vocals

- Maxi Anderson (1, 2)
- Billie Barnum (1, 2)
- Melinda Chatman (1, 2)
- David Cochrane (1, 2)
- Kevin Dorsey (1, 2)
- Karen Jackson (1, 2)
- Marlena Jeter (1, 2)
- Fred Law (1, 2)
- Janice Marie (1, 2)
- Richard Marx (1, 2, 7)
- Rick Nelson (1, 2)
- Brenda Richie (1, 2)
- Anita Sherman (1, 2)
- Karen Siegel (1, 2)
- Alfie Silas (1, 2)
- Phyllis St. James (1, 2)
- Stephanie Taylor (1, 2)
- Deborah Thomas (1, 2, 7)
- Carmen Twillie (1, 2)
- Julia Waters Tillman (1, 2, 7)
- Maxine Waters Willard (1, 2, 7)
- Leslie Smith (2)
- Lionel Richie (4)
- Suzee Ikeda (4)
- Marva King (4, 6, 9)
- Alabama (Randy Owen, Teddy Gentry and Jeff Cook) (5)
- Kitty Beethoven (9)
- Jennifer Hall (9)

Hoopa Hollers on "Dancing on the Ceiling":

- James Anthony Carmichael
- David Egerton
- Wayne Hargrave
- Linda Jenner
- Steve MacMillan
- Greg Phillinganes
- Kathi Pogoda
- Cheryl Pyle
- Carlos Rios
- Maximo Rios
- Dave Rosen
- Kelly Ryan
- Wibert Terrell

=== Production ===
- Lionel Richie – producer
- James Anthony Carmichael – producer
- Narada Michael Walden – producer (9)
- Brenda Harvey-Richie – production assistant
- Suzee Wendy Ikeda – production director
- Wilbert Terrell – assistant to Lionel Richie
- Kimberly Crenshaw Priestly – assistant to James Anthony Carmichael
- Johnny Lee – art direction
- Aaron Rapoport – photography
- Bill Whitten – fashion consultant
- Patrice Walters – stylist
- James Hajdukiewicz – hair
- Kragen & Co. – management

Technical credits

- Brian Gardner – mastering at Bernie Grundman Mastering (Hollywood, California)
- Calvin Harris – mixing, recording (1–8)
- David Frazer – recording (9)
- Gordon Lyon – recording (9)
- Fred Law – additional mixing, additional recording (1–8)
- David Egerton – additional recording (1–8), recording assistant (1–8)
- Steve MacMillan – mix assistant
- Karen Siegel – assistant engineer (1–8)
- Mark Smith – assistant engineer (1–8)
- Jim Cotton – assistant BGV engineer (5)
- Joe Scaife – assistant BGV engineer (5)
- Dana Jon Chappelle – assistant engineer (9)
- Stuart Hirotsu – assistant engineer (9)

== Charts ==
=== Weekly charts ===
| Chart (1986) | Peak position |
|---|---|
| Australian Albums (Kent Music Report) | 2 |
| Austrian Albums (Ö3 Austria) | 4 |
| Canada Top Albums/CDs (RPM) | 3 |
| Dutch Albums (Album Top 100) | 2 |
| German Albums (Offizielle Top 100) | 5 |
| New Zealand Albums (RMNZ) | 3 |
| Norwegian Albums (VG-lista) | 1 |
| Swedish Albums (Sverigetopplistan) | 2 |
| Swiss Albums (Schweizer Hitparade) | 2 |
| UK Albums (Official Charts) | 2 |
| US Billboard 200 | 1 |
| US Top R&B/Hip-Hop Albums (Billboard) | 3 |

=== Year-end charts ===
| Chart (1986) | Position |
|---|---|
| Canada Top Albums/CDs (RPM) | 12 |
| German Albums (Offizielle Top 100) | 55 |
| US Billboard 200 | 99 |
| US Top R&B/Hip-Hop Albums (Billboard) | 48 |

| Chart (1987) | Position |
|---|---|
| Canada Top Albums/CDs (RPM) | 22 |
| New Zealand Albums (RMNZ) | 28 |
| US Billboard 200 | 18 |
| US Top R&B/Hip-Hop Albums (Billboard) | 17 |

== Certifications and sales ==
| Region | Certification | Certified units/sales |
|---|---|---|
| Australia | — | 218,000 |
| Belgium (BRMA) | Gold | 25,000^{*} |
| Brazil | — | 200,000 |
| Canada (Music Canada) | 3× Platinum | 300,000^{^} |
| France (SNEP) | 2× Gold | 200,000^{*} |
| Hong Kong (IFPI Hong Kong) | Platinum | 20,000^{*} |
| Netherlands (NVPI) | Platinum | 100,000^{^} |
| New Zealand (RMNZ) | Platinum | 15,000^{^} |
| Spain (Promusicae) | Gold | 50,000^{^} |
| Switzerland (IFPI Switzerland) | Gold | 25,000^{^} |
| United Kingdom (BPI) | 2× Platinum | 600,000^{^} |
| United States (RIAA) | 4× Platinum | 4,000,000^{^} |
^{*} Sales figures based on certification alone.^{^} Shipments figures based on certification alone.

== Works cited ==
- Berry, Walter (October 18, 1986). "Richie 'conquers all' as an outrageous success". Chicago Sun-Times. Archived from the original on November 17, 2018 – via HighBeam Research.
- Christgau, Robert. "Lionel Richie". robertchristgau.com. Archived from the original on July 30, 2013.
- "Dancing on the Ceiling | Awards". AllMusic. Archived from the original on November 29, 2012.
- Decurtis, Anthony (November 6, 1986). "Lionel Richie: Dancing on the Ceiling". Rolling Stone. Archived from the original on November 30, 2007.
- Erlewine, Stephen Thomas. "Lionel Richie, Dancing on the Ceiling". AllMusic. Archived from the original on January 10, 2013.
- Grein, Paul (November 15, 1986). "Richie Sets Multiplatinum Record: Boston has RIAA Top Debut Album". Billboard. pp. 5, 100.
- Huey, Steve. "Lionel Richie". AllMusic. Archived from the original on February 10, 2013.
- Moleski, Linda (October 4, 1986). "Multiplatinum Life: Lionel Can't Slow Down..." Billboard. p. 24.
- Sloan, Robert (March 1, 2009). "What a Feeling ..I'm Still Dancing on the Ceiling". Sunday Mail. Archived from the original on March 8, 2016.(subscription required)
