= Love Will Conquer All =

Single by Lionel Richie

from the album Dancing on the Ceiling
- B-side: "The Only One"
- Released: September 1986
- Recorded: Fall 1985
- Genre: R&B; pop
- Length: 5:40
- Label: Motown
- Songwriters: Greg Phillinganes, Cynthia Weil, Lionel Richie
- Producers: Lionel Richie, James Anthony Carmichael

Lionel Richie singles chronology
"Dancing on the Ceiling" (1986)	"Love Will Conquer All" (1986)	""Ballerina Girl" (1986) /" (1987)

"Love Will Conquer All" is a track from Lionel Richie's 1986 album Dancing on the Ceiling featuring Marva King on backing vocals. The song was written by Richie along with Greg Phillinganes and Cynthia Weil. "Love Will Conquer All" was Richie's tenth number one on the Adult Contemporary chart. The single spent two weeks at number one and peaked at number nine on the Billboard Hot 100. "Love Will Conquer All" also went to number two for two weeks on the soul chart, behind "Tasty Love" by Freddie Jackson.

== Music video ==
The video is a road trip by Richie from San Francisco to Los Angeles through the rain and night to catch a woman who is concurrently leaving a note for him, refusing to answer his calls, and planning to leave.

== Track listings ==
7" Single

1. "Love Will Conquer All" 4:18
2. "The Only One" 4:17

12" Single

1. "Love Will Conquer All" (12" Vocal Version) 7:01
2. "Love Will Conquer All" (Instrumental) 6:18
3. "Love Will Conquer All" (Radio Edit) 5:01
4. "The Only One" 4:17

Note: tracks 1–3 remixed by Shep Pettibone

== Charts ==
Chart (1986–1987)	Peak position
Australia (Kent Music Report)	71
Canadian RPM Top Singles	19
Netherlands (Dutch Top 40)	24
New Zealand Singles Chart	24
South Africa (Springbok)	24
UK Singles Chart	45
U.S. Billboard Hot 100	9
U.S. Billboard Hot Black Singles	2
U.S. Billboard Hot Adult Contemporary Tracks	1

Year-end chart (1986)	Rank
US Top Pop Singles (Billboard)	97

== Cover versions ==
- 1988: George Howard (instrumental smooth jazz cover)
- 1996: Gwen Guthrie
- 2003: Patti LaBelle
