= Se La =

1987 single by Lionel Richie

Single by Lionel Richie

from the album Dancing on the Ceiling
- B-side: "Serves You Right"
- Released: March 1987
- Recorded: Fall 1985
- Genre: Pop; soul; reggae
- Label: Motown
- Songwriter(s): Greg Phillinganes; Lionel Richie
- Producer(s): Lionel Richie; James Anthony Carmichael

Lionel Richie singles chronology
""Ballerina Girl" (1986) /" (1987)	"Se La" (1987)	"Do It to Me" (1992)

"Se La" is a track from Lionel Richie's 1986 album Dancing on the Ceiling. The song was written by Richie and Greg Phillinganes, and produced by Richie and James Anthony Carmichael. Released in 1987 as the final single from the album, it would be Richie's last single of the 1980s.

== Track listing ==
7" single

1. "Se La" – 4:20
2. "Serves You Right" – 4:52

12" single / CD Single

1. "Se La" – 8:12
2. "Se La" – 4:20
3. "Serves You Right" – 4:52

Note: track 1 remixed by Steve Thompson and Michael Barbiero

== Charts ==
=== Weekly charts ===
Chart (1987)	Peak position
Belgium (Ultratop 50 Flanders)	2
Netherlands (Dutch Top 40)	8
Netherlands (Single Top 100)	12
UK Singles (OCC)	43
US Billboard Hot 100	20
US Adult Contemporary (Billboard)	5
US Hot R&B/Hip-Hop Songs (Billboard)	12
West Germany (GfK)	41

=== Year-end charts ===
Chart (1987)	Position
Belgium (Ultratop Flanders)	32
Netherlands (Dutch Top 40)	67
Netherlands (Single Top 100)	71
