= Penny Lover =

- North American 7" 45 RPM

Single by Lionel Richie

from the album Can't Slow Down
- B-side: "Tell Me"
- Released: September 1984
- Recorded: 1983
- Genre: Pop
- Length: 3:46 (single version); 5:35 (album version)
- Label: Motown
- Songwriters: Lionel Richie; Brenda Harvey Richie
- Producers: Lionel Richie; James Anthony Carmichael

Lionel Richie singles chronology
"Stuck on You" (1984)	"Penny Lover" (1984)	"Say You, Say Me" (1985)

Music video
- "Lionel Richie - Penny Lover (Official Music Video)" on YouTube

"Penny Lover" is the title of the fifth and final single released from Lionel Richie's multi-platinum 1983 album, Can't Slow Down. The song was written by Richie and his then-wife, Brenda Harvey Richie.

As with all the other singles taken from Can't Slow Down ("All Night Long (All Night)", "Running with the Night", "Hello" and "Stuck on You"), "Penny Lover" was a top ten hit on the Billboard Hot 100 chart, spending two weeks at No. 8 in December 1984. The song reached an identical No. 8 peak position on the Billboard R&B chart, while on the Billboard Adult Contemporary chart, the song logged four weeks at No. 1. On the UK Singles Chart, the song reached number 18. In Canada, it peaked at No. 12 on the RPM singles chart.

In a song review printed in Billboard by an anonymous writer in 1984, "Penny Lover" was described as "another of his unfailingly effective universal-appeal ballads".

== Music video ==
The music video was directed by Bob Giraldi, who had also directed "Running with the Night" and "Hello".

== Single version ==
In addition to being shortened by nearly 2 minutes, the single version is remixed with added reverb and more prominent background vocals, as well as a cold ending with just vocals and keyboard.

== Track listings ==
7" single

1. "Penny Lover" – 3:46
2. "Tell Me" – 4:06

12" single

1. "Penny Lover" – 5:33
2. "You Are" – 5:03
3. "My Love" – 4:05

== Charts ==
=== Weekly charts ===
Weekly chart performance for "Penny Lover"
Chart (1984–1985)	Peak position
Australia (Kent Music Report)	73
Belgium (Ultratop 50 Flanders)	10
Canada Top Singles (RPM)	12
Germany (GfK)	37
Ireland (IRMA)	8
Netherlands (Dutch Top 40)	11
Netherlands (Single Top 100)	14
New Zealand (Recorded Music NZ)	30
UK Singles (Official Charts)	18
US Billboard Hot 100	8
US Adult Contemporary (Billboard)	1
US Hot R&B/Hip-Hop Songs (Billboard)	8

=== Year-end charts ===
1984 Year-end chart performance for "Penny Lover"
Chart (1984)	Position
Belgium (Ultratop Flanders)	90
Netherlands (Dutch Top 40)	77

1985 Year-end chart performance for "Penny Lover"
Chart (1985)	Position
US Top Pop Singles (Billboard)	96
US Adult Contemporary (Billboard)	35

== Other versions ==
Jamaican reggae duo Sly and Robbie covered the song in 1997, from their album Friends. It features singer Ambelique, and the song also appears on his 1997 album Sings the Classics. The single reached No. 94 on the UK Singles Chart.

== See also ==
- List of Hot Adult Contemporary number ones of 1984
