= Ballerina Girl =

1986 song written and recorded by Lionel Richie

Single by Lionel Richie

from the album Dancing on the Ceiling
- B-side: "Deep River Woman"
- Released: November 1986
- Recorded: Winter 1985
- Genre: Soul
- Length: 3:36
- Label: Motown
- Songwriter: Lionel Richie
- Producers: Lionel Richie; James Anthony Carmichael

Lionel Richie singles chronology
| "Love Will Conquer All" (1986) | "Ballerina Girl" (1986) | "Se La" (1987) |

Audio
- "Ballerina Girl" on YouTube

"Ballerina Girl" is a song written and recorded by Lionel Richie, from his 1986 album Dancing on the Ceiling. The song was written for Lionel's daughter, Nicole. In the US and Canada, the song was released as a double A-side, with "Deep River Woman" entering the charts in January 1987.

"Ballerina Girl" peaked at number five on the soul charts and became his thirteenth consecutive top ten single and penultimate top ten R&B hit of his career. The song was also the last of Richie's eleven number ones on the Adult Contemporary charts, spending four weeks on top. Richie set a chart record for being the artist with the most number one AC hits of the decade, succeeded by Whitney Houston, who had seven number one singles in the decade, and Billy Joel, who had the third most with six. "Ballerina Girl" peaked at number seven on the Billboard Hot 100 in early 1987, becoming his last top ten hit on that chart to date. The song became Richie's thirteenth (and last) career single to simultaneously reach the top ten on the pop, R&B and AC charts, still the most by a male artist. Artists such as Whitney Houston and Mariah Carey would surpass his numbers with 16 and 14 simultaneous top ten hits on the three charts respectively with Houston still holding the record to this day.

== Music video ==
In the music video, Richie plays the song on a piano in a ballet school, while young ballet students dance.

== Reception ==
Mat Snow of NME said, ""All Night Long" is amongst the most justly infectious floor-fillers ever. Unfortunately, his subsequent output would make Nana Mouskouri cringe, and this richly moustachioed ballad alters this regrettable situation not one whit."

== Track listings ==
7" Single

1. "Ballerina Girl" - 3:36
2. "Deep River Woman" - 4:35

== Charts ==
=== Weekly charts ===
Weekly chart performance for "Ballerina Girl"
| Chart (1986–1987) | Peak position |
|---|---|
| Australia (Kent Music Report) | 43 |
| Belgium (Ultratop 50 Flanders) | 22 |
| Canada Adult Contemporary (RPM) | 1 |
| Canada Top Singles (RPM) | 10 |
| France (SNEP) | 18 |
| Germany (GfK) | 66 |
| Netherlands (Dutch Top 40) | 35 |
| Netherlands (Single Top 100) | 39 |
| South Africa (Springbok SA Top 20) | 24 |
| UK Singles (Official Charts) | 17 |
| US Billboard Hot 100 | 7 |
| US Adult Contemporary (Billboard) | 1 |
| US Hot R&B/Hip-Hop Songs (Billboard) | 5 |

=== Year-end charts ===
1987 year-end chart performance for "Ballerina Girl"
| Chart (1987) | Position |
|---|---|
| Canada Top Singles (RPM) | 79 |
| Europe (Eurochart Hot 100 Singles) | 90 |
| US Top Pop Singles (Billboard) | 95 |
