= Lionel Richie =

American singer (born 1949)

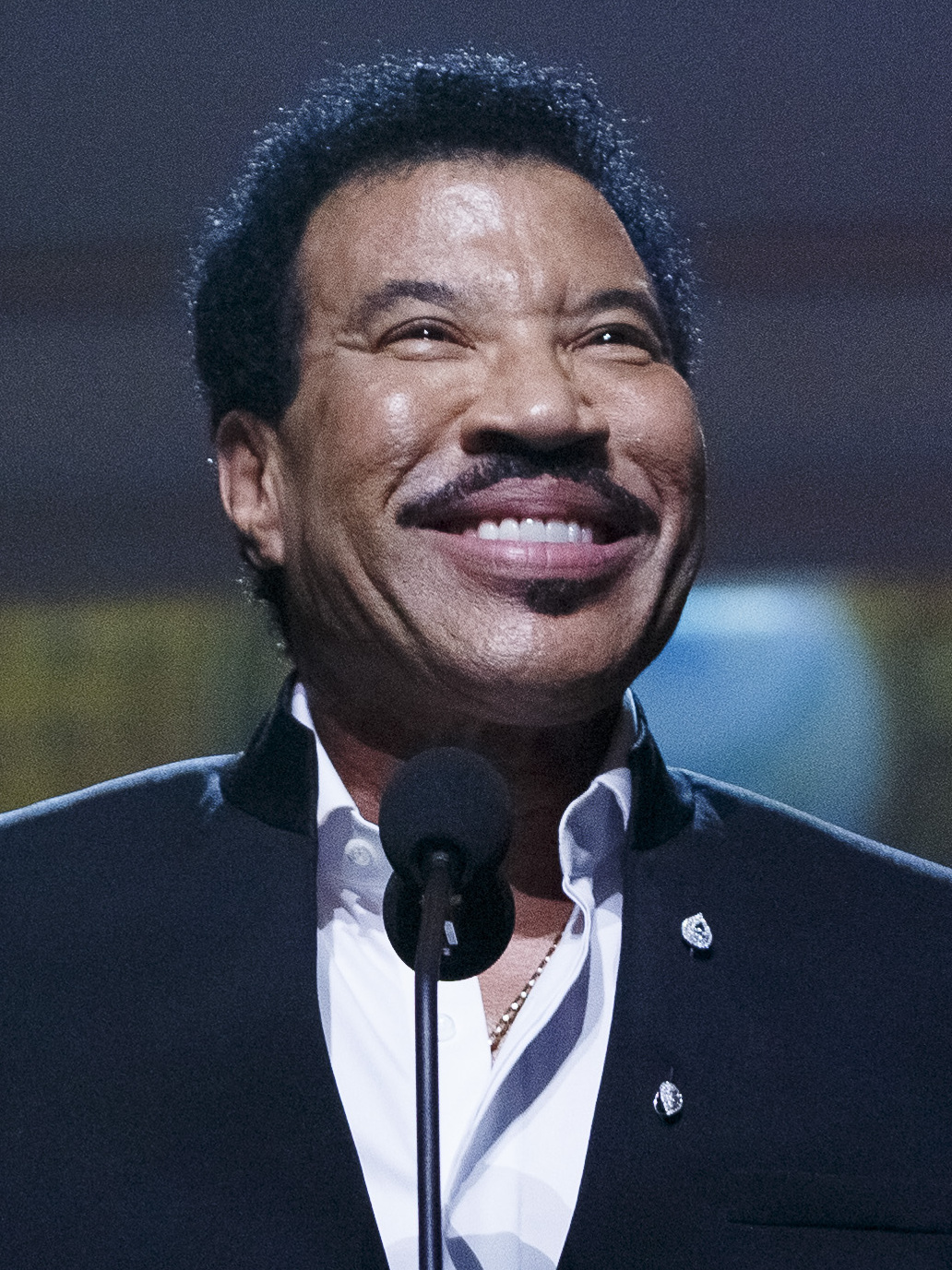
- Richie in 2022
- Born: Lionel Brockman Richie Jr. June 20, 1949 (age 77); Tuskegee, Alabama, U.S.
- Occupations: Singer; songwriter; musician; record producer; television personality
- Years active: 1968–present
- Spouses: Brenda Harvey (m. 1975; div. 1993) Diane Alexander (m. 1995; div. 2004)
- Children: 3, including Nicole and Sofia
- Musical career
- Genres: Soul; R&B; pop; funk
- Instruments: Vocals; keyboards; saxophone
- Labels: Island; Mercury; AAMG; Motown
- Formerly of: Commodores
- Website: lionelrichie.com

Lionel Brockman Richie Jr. (born June 20, 1949) is an American singer, songwriter, musician, record producer, and television personality. He rose to fame in the 1970s as a songwriter and the co-lead singer of the Motown group Commodores; writing and recording the hit singles "Easy", "Sail On", "Three Times a Lady", and "Still" with the group before his departure. In 1980, he wrote and produced the US Billboard Hot 100 number one single "Lady" for Kenny Rogers.

In 1981, Richie wrote and produced the single "Endless Love", which he recorded as a duet with Diana Ross; it remains among the top 20 bestselling singles of all time, and the biggest career hit for both artists. In 1982, he officially launched his solo career with the album Lionel Richie, which sold over four million copies and spawned the singles "You Are", "My Love", and the number one single "Truly".

Richie's second album, Can't Slow Down (1983), reached number one on the US Billboard 200 chart and sold over 20 million copies worldwide, becoming one of the best-selling albums of all time, and spawned the number one singles "All Night Long (All Night)" and "Hello". He then co-wrote the 1985 charity single "We Are the World" with Michael Jackson, which sold over 20 million copies. His third album, Dancing on the Ceiling (1986), contained the number one single "Say You, Say Me" (from the 1985 film White Nights) and the No. 2 hit title track. From 1986 to 1996, Richie took a break from recording; he has since then released seven studio albums. He has joined the singing competition American Idol to serve as a judge, starting from its 16th season (2018 to present).

During his solo career, Richie became one of the most successful balladeers of the 1980s, and has sold over 90 million records worldwide, making him one of the world's best-selling artists of all time. He has won four Grammy Awards, including Song of the Year for "We Are the World", and Album of the Year for Can't Slow Down. "Endless Love" was nominated for an Academy Award, while "Say You, Say Me" won both the Academy Award and the Golden Globe award for Best Original Song.

In 2016, Richie received the Songwriters Hall of Fame's highest honor, the Johnny Mercer Award. In 2022, he received the Gershwin Prize for Popular Song by the Library of Congress; as well as the American Music Awards Icon Award. He was also inducted into Black Music & Entertainment Walk of Fame, and the Rock and Roll Hall of Fame in 2022.

== Early life ==
Lionel Brockman Richie Jr. was born on June 20, 1949, in Tuskegee, Alabama, the son of Lionel Brockman Richie Sr., a U.S. Army systems analyst, and Alberta R. Foster, a teacher and school principal. His grandmother Adelaide Mary Brown was a pianist who played classical music. On March 4, 2011, he appeared on NBC's Who Do You Think You Are?, which found out that his maternal great-grandfather, J. Louis Brown, was most likely the biological son of federal judge and slaveowner Morgan Welles Brown. He was also the national leader of an early Black American fraternal organization. Notably, J. Louis Brown was:

[P]rincipal organizer and Supreme Grand Archon of the Knights of Wise Men, a fraternal organization for black men in the post-Civil War period. Formed in Nashville in 1879, it was a fraternal insurance and burial benefit society, as were so many others during the period.

Richie grew up on the campus of Tuskegee Institute. Their family home was given to his grandparents as a gift from Booker T. Washington. He graduated from Joliet Township High School, East Campus in Joliet, Illinois. A star tennis player in Joliet, he accepted a tennis scholarship to attend Tuskegee Institute, where he was a member of the marching band, the Marching Crimson Pipers , and graduated with a Bachelor of Science degree in economics with a minor in accounting.

Richie considered studying divinity to become a priest in the Episcopal Church, in which he had been baptised, but ultimately decided he was not "priest material" and decided to continue his musical career despite not knowing how to read or write music. He is a member of Kappa Kappa Psi, a national honor fraternity for band members, and an active life member of Alpha Phi Alpha fraternity.

== Career ==
=== Commodores ===
As a student in Tuskegee, Richie formed a succession of R&B groups in the mid-1960s. In 1968, he became a singer and saxophonist with the Commodores. They signed a recording contract with Atlantic Records in 1968 for one record before moving on to Motown Records initially as a support act to The Jackson 5. The Commodores then became established as a popular soul group. Their first several albums had a danceable, funky sound, as in such tracks as "Machine Gun" and "Brick House". Over time, Richie wrote and sang more romantic, easy-listening ballads such as "Easy", "Three Times a Lady", "Still", and the breakup ballad "Sail On".

In 1974, Richie achieved his first commercial success as a songwriter with "Happy People", which he co-wrote with Jeffrey Bowen and Donald Baldwin. Originally intended as a Commodores track, it was recorded by The Temptations, who had their No. 1 R&B with the song. By the late 1970s, Richie had begun to accept songwriting commissions from other artists. He wrote "Lady" for Kenny Rogers, which hit No. 1 in 1980, and produced Rogers' album Share Your Love the following year. Richie and Rogers maintained a strong friendship in later years. Latin jazz composer and salsa romantica pioneer La Palabra enjoyed international success with his cover of "Lady", which was played at Latin dance clubs. Also in 1981, Richie sang the title theme song for the film Endless Love, a duet with Diana Ross. Issued as a single, the song topped the Canada, Brazil, Australia, Japan, New Zealand and US pop music charts, and became one of Motown's biggest hits.

=== Solo career ===
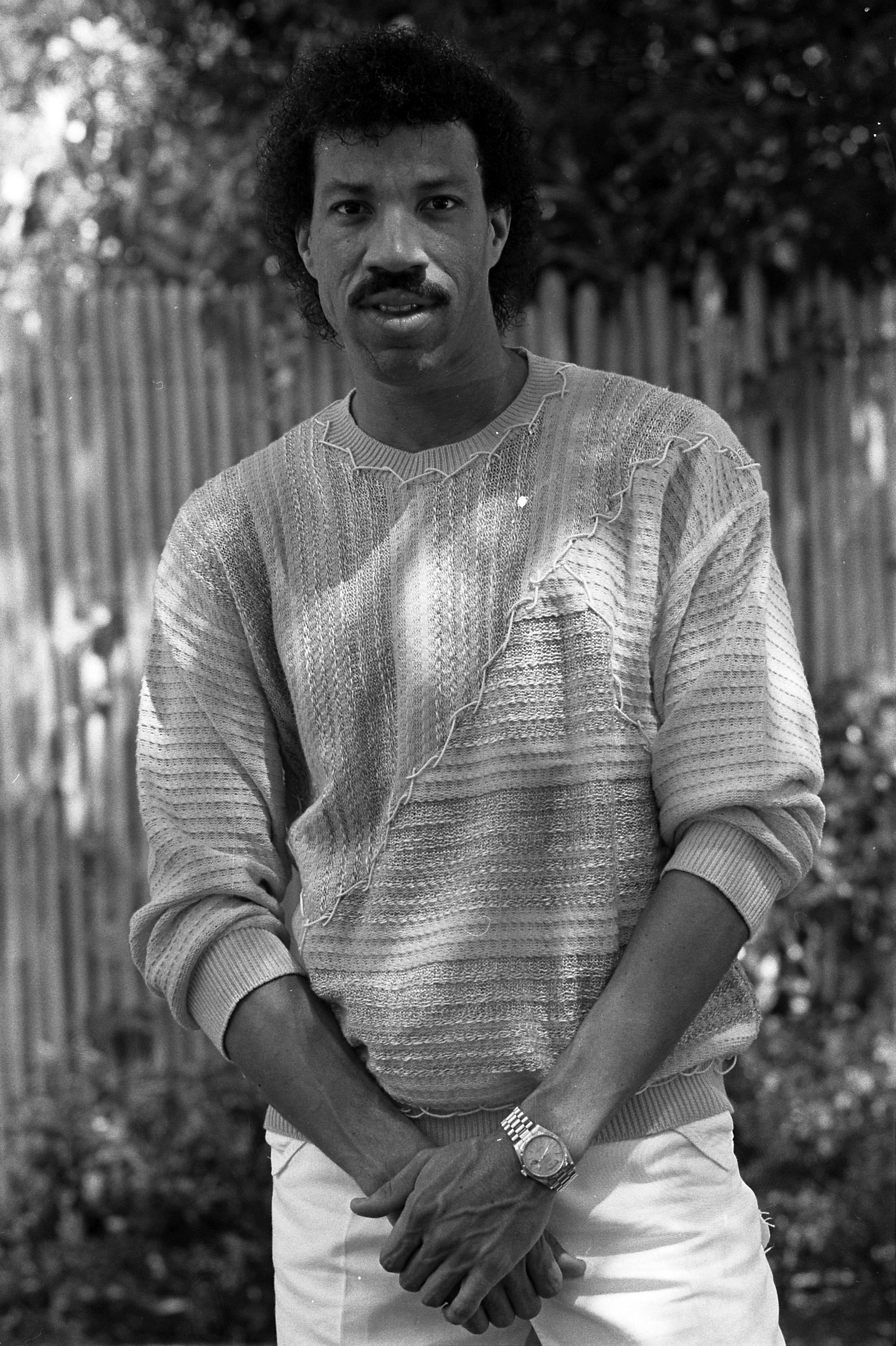
Richie in 1984

Richie's 1982 debut solo album, Lionel Richie, contained three hit singles: the U.S. number-one song "Truly", which continued the style of his ballads with the Commodores and launched his career as one of the most successful balladeers of the 1980s, and the top five hits "You Are" and "My Love". The album hit No. 3 on the music charts and sold over 4 million copies.

His 1983 follow-up album, Can't Slow Down, sold over twice as many copies and won two Grammy Awards, including Album of the Year, propelling him into the first rank of international superstars. The album contained the number-one hit "All Night Long", a Caribbean-flavored dance number that was promoted by a colorful music video produced by former Monkee Michael Nesmith. In 1984, he performed "All Night Long" at the ending ceremony of the XXIII Olympic Games in Los Angeles.

Several more Top 10 hits followed, the most successful of which was the ballad "Hello" (1984), a sentimental love song that showed how far he had moved from his R&B roots. Richie had three more top ten hits in 1984, "Stuck on You" (No. 3), "Running with the Night" (No. 7) and "Penny Lover" (No. 8), as well as writing and producing "Missing You" for former labelmate and duet partner Diana Ross (No. 10 Pop, No. 1 R&B). In 1985, he wrote and performed "Say You, Say Me" for the film White Nights. The song won an Academy Award and reached No. 1 on the U.S. charts, staying there for four weeks, making it the number-two song of 1986 according to Billboard's Year-End Hot 100 chart, behind the charity single "That's What Friends Are For" by Dionne and Friends. He also collaborated with Michael Jackson on the charity single "We Are the World" by USA for Africa, another number-one hit.

In 1986, Richie released Dancing on the Ceiling, his last widely popular album, which produced a run of five US and UK hits, "Say You, Say Me" (U.S. No. 1), "Dancing on the Ceiling" (U.S. No. 2), "Love Will Conquer All" (U.S. No. 9), "Ballerina Girl" (U.S. No. 7), and "Se La" (U.S. No. 20). He made his return to recording and performing following the release of his first greatest-hits collection, Back to Front, in 1992.

Since then, his ever-more-relaxed schedule has kept his recording and live work to a minimum. He broke the silence in 1996 with Louder Than Words, on which he resisted any change of style or the musical fashion-hopping of the past decade, sticking instead with his chosen path of well-crafted soul music, which in the intervening years has become known as contemporary R&B.

Richie's albums in the late 1990s such as Louder Than Words and Time failed to match the commercial success of his earlier work. Some of his recent albums, such as Renaissance and Just for You, have returned to his older style and achieved success in Europe but only modest notice in the United States.

=== Later career ===
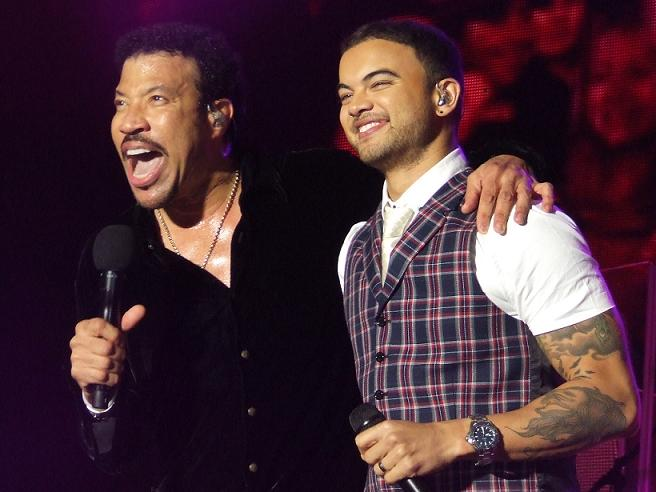
Richie and Guy Sebastian performing "All Night Long" during Richie's 2011 Australian and New Zealand tour

Richie was the headliner at a 2006 Fourth of July tribute concert with Fantasia Barrino at the Philadelphia Museum of Art. On May 7, 2006, Richie performed on the main stage (Acura Stage) at the New Orleans Jazz & Heritage Festival, replacing Antoine "Fats" Domino, who had fallen ill. Richie released his eighth studio album titled "Coming Home" on September 12, 2006. The first single of the album was "I Call It Love" and was premiered in July 2006, becoming his biggest hit in the U.S. in ten years. The album was a success for Richie in the United States, peaking at No. 6.

On May 2, 2008, Richie was the 21st recipient of the George and Ira Gershwin Lifetime Achievement Award at UCLA's annual Spring Sing. In accepting the award, Richie said: "Forget about surviving 30 some odd years in the music business, Lionel Richie survived 27 years of Nicole Richie."

In May 2009, Richie announced that he would like to get The Commodores back together soon. An album, Just Go, was released in 2009. On July 7, 2009, Richie performed "Jesus is Love" at Michael Jackson's memorial service.

Richie returned to Australia in 2011 where he and guest artist Guy Sebastian toured the country and New Zealand with concert dates throughout March and April. Richie and Guy Sebastian recorded Richie's 1983 number-one single "All Night Long" together to raise money for Australian floods and New Zealand earthquake relief.

On March 26, 2012, Richie released his tenth studio album, Tuskegee, which featured 13 of his hit songs performed as duets with country stars. The album returned him to the top of the Billboard 200 chart, his first number one album there since Dancing on the Ceiling, and achieved platinum status within six weeks of release.

On June 28, 2015, Richie played to an audience of between 100,000 and 120,000 people at the Glastonbury Festival, England. His show was described as "triumphant" by the BBC and was followed by his return to the top of the UK albums chart with a reissued compilation album of his work as both a solo artist and with the Commodores. In September 2017, ABC announced that Richie would be a judge for the revival of American Idol. Richie has been a judge on the reboot for seven seasons, including 2024.

In May 2017, Richie was honored at Berklee College of Music during its 2017 commencement concert when graduating students performed a medley of his discography. Richie was also awarded an Honorary Doctorate of Music. On December 3, 2017, Richie received the Kennedy Center Honors. In October 2017, it was reported that Richie had secured the rights to produce a Curtis Mayfield biopic.

On March 25, 2019, Richie announced a 33-date tour across North America for the summer. His 'Hello Tour' started in May at Arlington's KAABOO Festival and ran through August.

In May 2023, Richie was invited to be a headline act at Windsor Castle for the Coronation Concert, in celebration of the Coronation of Charles III and Camilla. Richie is the First Global Ambassador and First Chairman of the Global Ambassador Group for the Prince's Trust.

In September 2025, Richie released his memoir, Truly, which reached #3 on The New York Times Best Seller list for Hardcover Nonfiction.

=== Popularity in the Arab states ===
Richie is a popular musician in various Arab states, and has performed in Morocco, the United Arab Emirates, Egypt and Libya. John Berman for ABC News reported in 2006 that "Grown Iraqi men get misty-eyed by the mere mention of his name. 'I love Lionel Richie,' they say. They can sing an entire Lionel Richie song." Berman wrote that Richie said he was told that Iraqi civilians were playing "All Night Long" the night U.S. tanks invaded Baghdad. Richie was against the war and has said he would like to perform in Baghdad someday.

== Personal life ==
On October 18, 1975, Richie married his college sweetheart, Brenda Harvey. In 1983, the couple informally adopted Nicole Camille Escovedo (now Nicole Richie), the two-year-old daughter of a member of Richie's band, who is also the niece of drummer Sheila E. The Richies raised Nicole and adopted her legally when she was nine years old.

In June 1988, Harvey was arrested and charged with corporal injury to a spouse, resisting arrest, trespassing, vandalism, battery, and disturbing the peace after she found Richie at Diane Alexander's Beverly Hills apartment.

Richie married Diane Alexander on December 21, 1995. They have a son, Miles Richie, and a daughter, Sofia Richie. The marriage ended in 2004.

Richie became a grandfather in 2008 when Nicole Richie gave birth to a baby girl with Joel Madden, lead singer of the rock band Good Charlotte. Richie's second grandchild was born to the couple in 2009.

Richie is a Freemason.

Richie helped to raise over $3.1 million for the Breast Cancer Research Foundation. Richie told the crowd that his grandmother was diagnosed with breast cancer in her 80s, but that she survived and lived until she was 103 years old. He stated that she was his enduring symbol of hope and his reason for becoming a breast cancer activist.

=== Health ===
Richie suffered prolonged throat problems and underwent surgery four times over a four-year period. Conventional doctors subsequently told him that he could lose his singing career. He later sought treatment from a holistic doctor, who attributed the problem to acid reflux caused by foods Richie was eating before going to bed.

On June 24, 2026, during a joint concert with Earth, Wind & Fire in Saint Paul, Minnesota, Richie became dizzy while performing, and the concert was cut short. As a precaution, subsequent concerts in Chicago and Columbus, Ohio were postponed. The tour resumed in Pittsburgh on June 30.

On August 29, 2026, following his concert at the Muny in St. Louis, Richie checked himself into an intensive care unit to undergo medical tests. He was discharged on September 2.

On September 22, 2026, Richie was hospitalized again for heart-related issues and was receiving treatment for atrial fibrillation. As a result, the next three dates of the "Sing a Song All Night Long Tour with Earth, Wind & Fire" were cancelled.

== Awards ==
Richie has won four Grammy Awards including Song of the Year in 1985 for "We Are the World" which he co-wrote with Michael Jackson, Album of the Year in 1984 for Can't Slow Down, Producer of the Year (Non-Classical) in 1984, and Best Male Pop Vocal Performance for Truly in 1982.

Richie was the first person to receive an RIAA diamond album award.

Richie has been nominated for two Golden Globe awards and won one. In 1982, he was nominated for Best Original Song for the film Endless Love. In 1986, he was nominated and won the award for Best Original Song for the song "Say You, Say Me", featured in the film White Nights. This song also won the Academy Award for Best Original Song.

== Tours ==
=== Headlining ===
- Running With the Night Tour (1984)
- The Outrageous Tour (1986–1987)
- In Concert (1998–2001)
- The One World Tour (2004)
- Coming Home Tour (2007)
- Just Go Tour (2009)
- Tuskegee Tour (2012)
- All the Hits, All Night Long (2013–2016)
- All the Hits Tour (with Mariah Carey) (2017–2019)
- Hello! Hits Tour (2019)
- Sing a Song All Night Long Tour (with Earth, Wind & Fire) (2023–2024, 2026)
- Say Hello To The Hits Tour (2024–2025)

== Discography ==
=== Solo albums ===
- Lionel Richie (1982)
- Can't Slow Down (1983)
- Dancing on the Ceiling (1986)
- Louder Than Words (1996)
- Time (1998)
- Renaissance (2000)
- Just for You (2004)
- Coming Home (2006)
- Sounds of the Season (2006)
- Just Go (2009)
- Tuskegee (2012)

=== With Commodores ===
- Machine Gun (1974)
- Caught in the Act (1975)
- Movin' On (1975)
- Hot on the Tracks (1976)
- Commodores (1977)
- Natural High (1978)
- Midnight Magic (1979)
- Heroes (1980)
- In the Pocket (1981)

== Filmography ==
=== Television ===
Year	Title	Role	Notes
2007	The Simpsons	Himself (voice)	Episode "He Loves to Fly and He D'ohs"
2011	Who Do You Think You Are?	Himself	Episode: "Lionel Richie"
2012	Sport Relief 2012	Barman	Sketch: "Mo Farah and Misery Bear"
2014	Oprah's Master Class	Himself	Episode: "Lionel Richie"
2018–present	American Idol	Himself	Judge, Season 16–present
2019	American Housewife	Himself	Episode: "American Idol"
2020	Jeopardy! The Greatest of All Time	Himself	Episode: "Match 1"
2020	The Rookie	Himself	Episode: "The Overnight"
2022	Jeopardy!	Himself	Contestant; One episode

=== Film ===
Year	Title	Role	Notes	Ref
1977	Scott Joplin	The Minstrel Singers	Credited as The Commodores	
1978	Thank God It's Friday	Himself	with The Commodores	
1991	Madonna: Truth or Dare	Himself	Documentary	
1996	The Preacher's Wife	Britsloe		
1998	Pariah	Lavender Mob		
2019	The Black Godfather	Himself	Documentary	
2022	Studio 666	Himself		
2024	The Greatest Night in Pop	Himself	Documentary	
2026	Earth, Wind & Fire (To Be Celestial vs That's the Weight of the World)	Himself	Documentary	
2027	High in the Clouds	Gladstone	Voice role; In production	

== See also ==
- List of best-selling music artists
- List of highest-certified music artists in the United States
