= White Nights (1985 film) =

1985 American musical drama film

- Theatrical release poster
- Directed by: Taylor Hackford
- Screenplay by: James Goldman; Eric Hughes; Nancy Dowd (uncredited)
- Story by: James Goldman
- Produced by: William S. Gilmore; Taylor Hackford
- Starring: Mikhail Baryshnikov; Gregory Hines; Geraldine Page; Helen Mirren; Jerzy Skolimowski; Isabella Rossellini
- Cinematography: David Watkin
- Edited by: Fredric Steinkamp; William Steinkamp
- Music by: Michel Colombier
- Color process: Metrocolor
- Production company: Delphi IV Productions
- Distributed by: Columbia Pictures
- Release dates: November 8, 1985 (Chicago International Film Festival); November 22, 1985 (United States)
- Running time: 136 minutes
- Country: United States
- Languages: English; Russian
- Budget: $10–20 million
- Box office: $42.2 million

White Nights is a 1985 American musical drama film directed by Taylor Hackford and starring Mikhail Baryshnikov, Gregory Hines, Jerzy Skolimowski, Helen Mirren and Isabella Rossellini. It was choreographed by Twyla Tharp. The title refers to the sunlit summer nights of Leningrad (now Saint Petersburg), the setting for the majority of the film, situated just a few degrees below the Arctic Circle.

The film is notable both for the dancing of Hines and Baryshnikov and for the Academy Award-winning song "Say You, Say Me" by Lionel Richie in 1986, as well as "Separate Lives" performed by Phil Collins and Marilyn Martin and written by Stephen Bishop (also nominated). The film was the international film debut of Isabella Rossellini and Taylor Hackford met his future wife, Helen Mirren, during filming.

== Plot ==
Nikolai 'Kolya' Rodchenko (Baryshnikov) is a Russian ballet dancer who had previously defected from the Soviet Union. When the plane carrying him to his next performance in Tokyo has electrical problems and crash lands in Siberia, he is injured and recognized by KGB officer Colonel Chaiko (Jerzy Skolimowski). Chaiko contacts tap dancer Raymond Greenwood (Hines), who has defected to the Soviet Union, and gets them both to Leningrad. Chaiko wants Kolya to dance at the season's opening night at the Kirov, and Raymond to look after Kolya. To convince Kolya, Chaiko uses Galina Ivanova (Helen Mirren), a former ballerina who never left the Soviet Union and is an old flame of Kolya.

After an initial period of racial and artistic friction, the two dancers (and defectors in opposite directions) become strong friends. When Raymond discovers that his wife Darya (Isabella Rossellini) is pregnant, he decides he does not want their child to grow up in the Soviet Union, and together, with Kolya, they plan an escape with the help of Galina, who still has feelings for Rodchenko. During the escape attempt, Raymond chooses to stay behind in order to delay Chaiko, gaining time for Kolya and Darya to get to the U.S. consulate at Leningrad. Although Raymond is captured and incarcerated, he is traded by the Soviets for a political prisoner from Latin America, and reunites with Darya and Kolya.

== Cast ==
- Mikhail Baryshnikov as Nikolai 'Kolya' Rodchenko
- Gregory Hines as Raymond Greenwood
- Jerzy Skolimowski as Colonel Chaiko
- Helen Mirren as Galina Ivanova
- Geraldine Page as Anne Wyatt
- Isabella Rossellini as Darya Greenwood
- John Glover as Wynn Scott
- Stefan Gryff as Captain Kirigin
- William Hootkins as Chuck Malarek
- Shane Rimmer as Ambassador Larry Smith
- Marc Sinden as Charles
- Maryam d'Abo as French Girlfriend
- Daniel Benzali as Dr. Asher

== Production ==
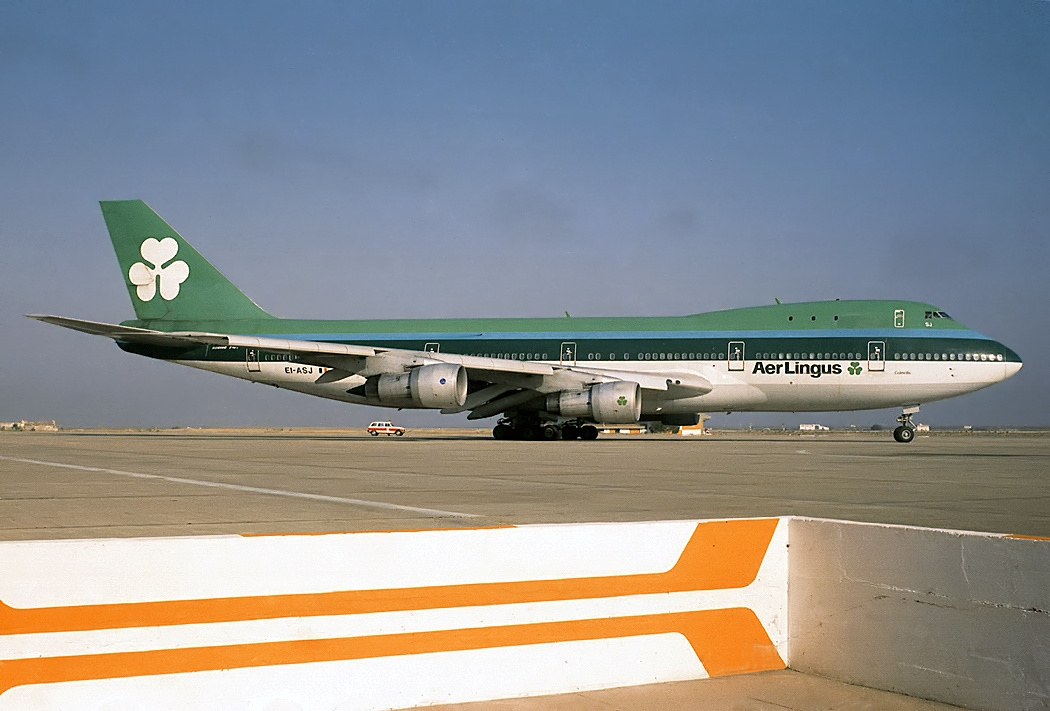
EI-ASJ, the 747 used in the film, seen in 1986

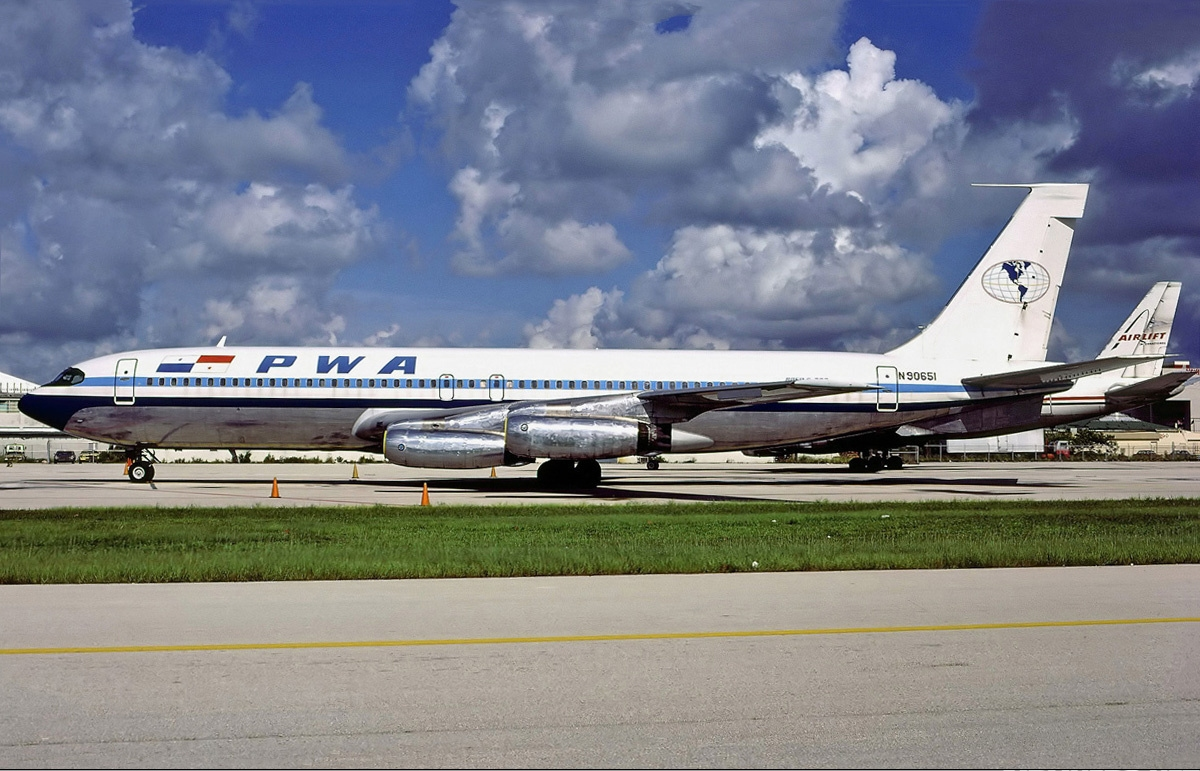
N90651, the 707 used in the film, seen in 1981

The opening ballet sequence, Le Jeune Homme et La Mort, originally choreographed by Roland Petit in 1946 and performed anew by Baryshnikov and Florence Faure, was filmed at the Bristol Hippodrome. The gentleman paging the curtain for Baryshnikov is John Randall, the theatre's technical director at the time.

In 1985, many western Cold War movies supposedly set in Russia would use locations in the Finnish capital with an architectural style resembling Leningrad. For White Nights, a team of travelogue filmmakers from Finland, who previously had done work in the Soviet Union, were hired to film a number of locations in Leningrad, such as the Kirov Theatre and the Lenin monument, as well as a Chaika state limousine. These scenes were then inserted into the movie, some being in-car scenes. Hackford was disappointed with critics who wrote negative reviews based on their belief that Helsinki had been used.

The film was also shot in Finland (including the island of Reposaari) and Lisbon, Portugal, as well as other parts of the United Kingdom, including Elstree Studios and RAF Machrihanish in Scotland.

Filmmakers normally use models to film the crash-landing of an aircraft as expensive as a Boeing 747. For the filming of the crash sequence of a British Orient 747 at the beginning of White Nights, two different full-sized aircraft were used.

- For shots representing the British Orient 747 while still aloft, a rebadged Aer Lingus Boeing 747 (EI-ASJ) performed a touch-and-go landing at RAF Machrihanish.
- For shots representing the British Orient 747 after touchdown, the production team purchased an older Boeing 707 from South America. The 707 was converted with the famous 747 hump, a painted cockpit and a small vision slit on the original cockpit, so the stunt pilots could perform the live action crash-landing. Due to the size differences, forced perspective was used to give the impression of a larger aircraft and short actors used in a brief sequence where a vehicle is almost hit. The 707 aircraft in question had originally been built for South African Airways (SAA) in July 1960 and registered as ZS-CKC (serial number 17928), and was retired from SAA in 1977. It was next operated by Panama World Airways as N90651, and commercially retired by same in 1981. Finally in September 1984 the aircraft was purchased by Columbia Pictures for the making of White Nights.

The film contains an early-career performance by Maryam d'Abo, later to star as a Bond girl in the James Bond film The Living Daylights.

White Nights was dedicated "in loving memory" to Mary E. Hackford (mother of Taylor) and Jerry Benjamin (father of executive supervisor Stuart Benjamin), both of whom died prior to its release.

== Reception ==
The film opened the Chicago International Film Festival on November 8, 1985, at McClurg Court. It then opened at the Ziegfeld Theatre in New York City on November 22 as well as in Chicago, Los Angeles, and Toronto before expanding nationally on December 6.

White Nights received mixed reviews from critics, as it currently holds a 46% rating on Rotten Tomatoes based on 13 reviews. The New York Times film critic Vincent Canby criticized the script as "ludicrous" but praised the acting and dance choreography, including Baryshnikov's "all of the dynamic force and intelligence that distinguish his dance performances" and Hines as "a great tap dancer but not in the same league with Mr. Baryshnikov as a film personality". Los Angeles Times film critic Sheila Benson criticized the story as "wretched high-concept, low-intelligence", the film's "oversimplification" of Russians as "hateful and corrupt" with an exception of "old Russian babushka", without the film explaining the character's transition "to kindness", and dance performances as "jazzed-up and simplistic". However, the film was a commercial success at the box office, grossing over $42 million in the United States.

=== Accolades ===
Award	Category	Nominee(s)	Result	Ref.
Academy Awards	Best Original Song	"Say You, Say Me"; Music and Lyrics by Lionel Richie	Won	
Academy Awards	Best Original Song	"Separate Lives"; Music and Lyrics by Stephen Bishop	Nominated	
BMI Film & TV Awards	Most Performed Song from a Film	"Separate Lives"; Music and Lyrics by Stephen Bishop	Won	
Golden Globe Awards	Best Original Score – Motion Picture	Michel Colombier	Nominated	
Golden Globe Awards	Best Original Song – Motion Picture	"Say You, Say Me"; Music and Lyrics by Lionel Richie	Won	

== Soundtrack ==
White Nights: Original Motion Picture Soundtrack

Soundtrack album by Various artists
- Released: October 16, 1985
- Genre: Rock
- Label: Atlantic

Singles from White Nights: Original Motion Picture Soundtrack
- 1. "Separate Lives" Released: September 1985; 2. "Say You, Say Me" Released: October 1985

The soundtrack album for the film contains the most successful single on the album, "Separate Lives" by Phil Collins and Marilyn Martin, which reached the top of the Billboard Hot 100 singles chart and was nominated for an Academy Award in 1986. The prize instead went to Lionel Richie's "Say You, Say Me", another chart topper which appeared in the film but was not included on the original soundtrack due to licensing issues. It was included in the album reissue as a bonus track along with "I Don't Wanna Know" by Phil Collins.

Allmusic gave the soundtrack three stars out of five.

1. "Separate Lives" - Phil Collins & Marilyn Martin
2. "Prove Me Wrong" - David Pack
3. "Far Post" - Robert Plant
4. "People on a String" - Roberta Flack
5. "This Is Your Day" - Nile Rodgers & Sandy Stewart
6. "Snake Charmer" - John Hiatt
7. "The Other Side of the World" - Chaka Khan
8. "My Love Is Chemical" - Lou Reed
9. "TapDance" - David Foster
10. "People Have Got to Move" - Jenny Burton
11. "Say You, Say Me" - Lionel Richie (bonus track - reissue)
12. "I Don't Wanna Know" - Phil Collins (bonus track - reissue)

=== Charts ===
Chart (1986)	Peak position
Australia (Kent Music Report)	17
Austrian Albums (Ö3 Austria)	15
Canada Top Albums/CDs (RPM)	14
Swedish Albums (Sverigetopplistan)	30
US Billboard 200	17
