= Can't Slow Down (Lionel Richie album) =

Studio album by Lionel Richie
- Released: October 14, 1983
- Recorded: March–September 1983
- Studios: Sunset Sound Recorders and Ocean Way Recording (Hollywood, California); Motown/Hitsville U.S.A. Recording Studios (Los Angeles, California)
- Genres: Dance-pop; R&B; pop; soul
- Length: 40:56
- Label: Motown
- Producers: James Anthony Carmichael; Lionel Richie; David Foster

Lionel Richie chronology
Lionel Richie (1982)	Can't Slow Down (1983)	Dancing on the Ceiling (1986)

Singles from Can't Slow Down
- 1. "All Night Long (All Night)" Released: August 1983; 2. "Running with the Night" Released: November 1983; 3. "Hello" Released: February 1984; 4. "Stuck on You" Released: June 1984; 5. "Penny Lover" Released: September 1984

Can't Slow Down is the second solo studio album by American recording artist Lionel Richie. It was released on October 14, 1983, by Motown.

Can't Slow Down has been certified Diamond by the RIAA, selling over 10 million copies in the United States and over 20 million copies worldwide, making it Richie's best-selling album, and one of the best-selling albums of the 1980s. Five singles were released from the album, all of which hit the top ten of the Billboard Hot 100 chart, including two that reached No. 1: "All Night Long (All Night)" and "Hello". The album subsequently won the Grammy Award for Album of the Year at the 27th Annual Grammy Awards in 1985.

== Critical reception ==
Professional ratings
Review scores
Source	Rating
AllMusic	4.5/5 stars
Robert Christgau	B+
Encyclopedia of Popular Music	4/5 stars
Rolling Stone	4/5 stars

In a contemporary review for The Village Voice, music critic Robert Christgau gave the album a "B+" and called it a "surprisingly solid" improvement, particularly with respect to Richie's ballad singing. He felt that its "jumpy international dance-pop" suited Richie more than the Commodores' funk had and predicted that, considering his "well-established appeal to white people," Can't Slow Down had the potential to become a "mini-Thriller". Don Shewey of Rolling Stone magazine gave the album four out of five stars and said that, although the ballads were monotonous, Richie successfully broadened his music for different listeners and drew on contemporary artists such as Stevie Wonder and Michael Jackson: "if you can't innovate, imitate. And the more honest they are about their sources, the better."

In a retrospective review for AllMusic, Stephen Thomas Erlewine gave it four-and-a-half out of five stars and wrote that Richie took a conservative, melodic hook-based approach on an album whose hits showed him at his best and whose only weakness was a short running time. In 1999, Q magazine included Can't Slow Down on its list of the best Motown records of all time and stated, "Production values are high, his songwriting craft is at its peak and at least one track – the global smash 'All Night Long' – is an anthem to good times that makes the heart sing and feet twitch".

== Commercial performance and re-releases ==
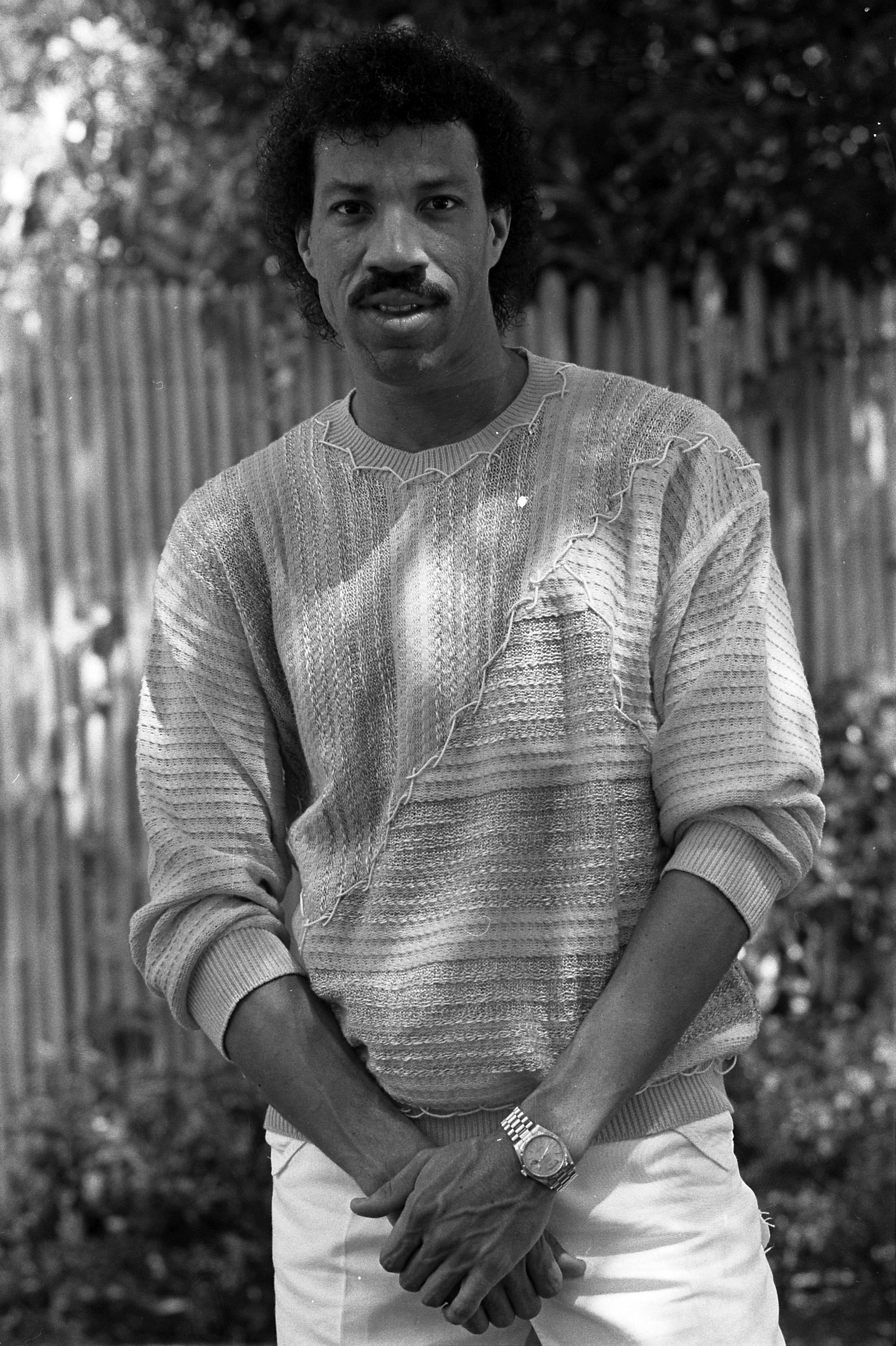
Richie in 1984. Can't Slow Down went on to win Album of the Year at the 27th Annual Grammy Awards in 1985, and remains one of the best-selling albums of the 1980s.

The album reached No. 1 on the Billboard album chart. It also spent 59 consecutive weeks inside the top 10 (including the entire year of 1984) and a total of 160 weeks (over three years) on the Billboard 200. After being the third best-selling album of 1984, it went on to win a Grammy Award for Album of the Year in 1985, beating out such heavyweight contenders as Born in the U.S.A. by Bruce Springsteen and Purple Rain by Prince. By 1986 the album had sold 15 million copies, eventually selling over 20 million.

Can't Slow Down achieved the feat of having every single released hit the top ten on the Billboard Hot 100 chart. Two songs, "Hello" and "All Night Long (All Night)", both went to No. 1. Other hits include "Stuck on You" (US No. 3), "Running With the Night" (US No. 7), and "Penny Lover" (US No. 8). The single "Stuck on You" also reached No. 24 on the Billboard Hot Country Singles & Tracks chart.

On May 6, 2003, a two-CD deluxe edition of the album was released in conjunction of the 20th anniversary of the album's original release date. This version included several mixes originally included on various singles from the album at the end of the first CD, including instrumental versions of the 12-inch extended mixes of "All Night Long (All Night)" and "Running with the Night". Disc 2 showcased demo or alternate versions of all tracks from the original album, plus additional unfinished songs from the same sessions, all previously unreleased.

== Track listing ==
All tracks are written by Lionel Richie, with additional writers noted.

Side one
No.	Title	Writer(s)	Length
1.	"Can't Slow Down"	David Cochrane	4:43
2.	"All Night Long (All Night)"		6:25
3.	"Penny Lover"	Brenda Harvey-Richie	5:34
4.	"Stuck on You"		3:13

Side two
No.	Title	Writer(s)	Length
5.	"Love Will Find a Way"	Greg Phillinganes	6:16
6.	"The Only One"	David Foster	4:21
7.	"Running with the Night"	Cynthia Weil	6:01
8.	"Hello"		4:08
Total length:			40:56

2003 Deluxe Edition bonus tracks
No.	Title	Writer(s)	Length
9.	"All Night Long (All Night)" (12" version)		6:42
10.	"Penny Lover" (7" single remix)	Harvey-Richie	3:49
11.	"All Night Long (All Night)" (instrumental) (12" B-side)		6:44
12.	"Running with the Night" (instrumental)	Weil	6:58

2003 Deluxe Edition disc 2
No.	Title	Writer(s)	Length
1.	"Can't Slow Down" (alternate version)	Cochrane	4:55
2.	"Ain't No Sayin' No" (unfinished demo version)	Phillinganes	4:57
3.	"Tell Me" (unfinished demo version)	Cochran	4:58
4.	"All Night Long (All Night)" (original demo version)		7:21
5.	"Penny Lover" (alternate version)	Harvey-Richie	6:25
6.	"Stuck on You" (original demo version)		3:00
7.	"Can't Find Love" (unfinished demo version)		5:51
8.	"Love Will Find a Way" (original demo version)	Phillinganes	6:35
9.	"The Only One" (original demo version)	Foster	4:29
10.	"The Groove" (interlude)		1:15
11.	"Running with the Night" (undubbed version)	Weil	6:14
12.	"Hello" (original demo version)		4:27
13.	"Blues" (outro)		1:13

== Personnel ==
Credits adapted from the album's liner notes, except where noted.

Musicians

- Lionel Richie – lead vocals, Yamaha GS-1 (2–4), backing vocals (2–7), acoustic piano (8)
- David Cochrane – synthesizer (1), synthesizer programming (1), vocoder (1), guitars (1, 5), bass synthesizer (1), backing vocals (2, 5, 7)
- Greg Phillinganes – Yamaha GS-1 (2, 5), synthesizer (5)
- John Hobbs – Fender Rhodes (3), electric piano (7)
- Michael Boddicker – synthesizers (3, 4, 7, 8), Wave (3), Emulator (4), additional synthesizer (5), vocoder (7)
- Brian Banks – synthesizer programming (5)
- Anthony Marinelli – synthesizer programming (5)
- David Foster – keyboards (6), bass guitar (6)
- Reginald "Sonny" Burke – Fender Rhodes (8)
- Darrell Jones – guitar (2), acoustic guitar (4), electric guitar (8)
- Tim May – guitar (2), acoustic guitar (8)
- Carlos Rios – guitar (3, 7)
- Mitch Holder – guitar (4)
- Louie Shelton – guitar (4, 8)
- Steve Lukather – guitar (6), guitar solo (7)
- Fred Tackett – acoustic guitar (4)
- Abraham Laboriel – bass guitar (2, 3)
- Joe Chemay – bass guitar (4, 7, 8)
- Nathan East – bass guitar (5)
- Paul Leim – Simmons drum (1), drums (3, 4, 8)
- John Robinson – drums (2, 6)
- Jeff Porcaro – drums (7)
- Paulinho da Costa – percussion (2, 7)
- Charlie Loper – trombone (2)
- Bill Reichenbach Jr. – trombone (2)
- Chuck Findley – trumpet (2)
- Gary Grant – trumpet (2)
- Jerry Hey – trumpet (2)
- Israel Baker – concertmaster (3, 4, 6)
- Harry Bluestone – concertmaster (8)
- James Anthony Carmichael – backing vocals (2)
- Richard Marx – backing vocals (2, 5–7)
- Deborah Thomas – backing vocals (2, 5, 7)
- Kin Vassy – backing vocals (2)
- Melinda Joyce Chatman – vocal sound effects (2)
- Jeanette Hawes – backing vocals (5)

Music arrangements

- Lionel Richie – all vocal arrangements, arrangements (1), rhythm arrangements (2–4, 6–8)
- James Anthony Carmichael – arrangements (1), rhythm arrangements (2–5, 7, 8), string arrangements (2–4, 8), horn arrangements (2, 3)
- David Cochrane – arrangements (1)
- Greg Phillinganes – rhythm arrangements (5)
- David Foster – rhythm arrangements (6)
- Jeremy Lubbock – string arrangements (6)

Chant on "All Night Long"

- Diane Burt
- James Anthony Carmichael
- Melinda Joyce Chatman
- David Cochrane
- Dr. Lloyd Byron Greig
- Cal Harris
- Brenda Harvey-Richie
- Jeanette Hawes
- Janice Marie Johnson
- Richard Marx
- Deborah Joyce Richie
- Lionel Richie
- Suzanne Stanford
- Deborah Thomas

Hoopa Hollers on "All Night Long"

- Marilyn Ammons
- Sue Ann Butler
- Melinda Joyce Chatman
- Sheldon J. Cohn, Esq.
- Sandy Dent-Crimmel
- Ruth Diaz
- David Egerton
- Sylvia Genauer
- Rejauna Lynn Green
- Gabrielle Greig
- Sally Greig
- Tanya Greig
- Darrell Jones
- David Malvin
- Alison Maxwell
- Jerry Montes
- John Michael Montes
- Billy "Bass" Nelson
- Greg Phillinganes
- Carlos Rios
- Suzanne Stanford
- Randy Stern
- Wilbert Terrell
- Susan Wood

Technical

- Lionel Richie – producer
- James Anthony Carmichael – producer (1–5, 7, 8)
- David Foster – producer (6)
- Calvin Harris – recording engineer, mixing engineer (1–5, 7, 8)
- Larry Fergusson – recording engineer (6)
- Humberto Gatica – recording engineer (6), mixing engineer (6)
- Jane Clark – additional recording and mixing engineer
- David Egerton – second recording engineer (1–5, 7)
- Mark Ettel – second recording engineer (1–5, 7)
- Steve Crimmel – second recording engineer (1–5, 7)
- Terry Christian – second recording engineer (6)
- Jim Cassell – second recording engineer (8)
- Fred Law – second mixing engineer
- Karen Siegel – second mixing engineer
- Bernie Grundman – mastering
- Brenda Harvey-Richie – production assistant
- Melinda Joyce Chatman – assistant to the production assistant
- Rita Leigh – creative assistant
- Johnny Lee – art direction
- Greg Gorman – front and back cover photography
- Chris Callis – inner spread photography
- Kragen & Co. – management

== Charts ==
=== Weekly charts ===
Weekly chart performance for Can't Slow Down
Chart (1983–1984)	Peak position
Argentinian Albums (CAPIF)	2
Australian Albums (Kent Music Report)	1
Austrian Albums (Ö3 Austria)	17
Canada Top Albums/CDs (RPM)	1
Dutch Albums (Album Top 100)	1
European Albums (European Top 100 Albums)	2
German Albums (Offizielle Top 100)	2
New Zealand Albums (RMNZ)	1
Norwegian Albums (VG-lista)	3
Swedish Albums (Sverigetopplistan)	2
Swiss Albums (Schweizer Hitparade)	3
UK Albums (Official Charts)	1
US Billboard 200	1
US Top R&B/Hip-Hop Albums (Billboard)	1
US Top Country Albums (Billboard)	55

=== Year-end charts ===
1983 year-end chart performance for Can't Slow Down
Chart (1983)	Position
Dutch Albums (Album Top 100)	15

1984 year-end chart performance for Can't Slow Down
Chart (1984)	Position
Australian Albums (Kent Music Report)	1
Canadian Albums (RPM)	6
Dutch Albums (Album Top 100)	1
German Albums (Offizielle Top 100)	4
New Zealand Albums (RMNZ)	11
Swiss Albums (Schweizer Hitparade)	7
UK Albums (OCC)	1
US Billboard 200	3
US Top R&B/Hip-Hop Albums (Billboard)	1

1985 year-end chart performance for Can't Slow Down
Chart (1985)	Position
Australian Albums (Kent Music Report)	12
Canadian Albums (RPM)	64
Dutch Albums (Album Top 100)	78
US Billboard 200	22
US Top R&B/Hip-Hop Albums (Billboard)	29

=== Decade-end charts ===
Decade-end chart performance for Can't Slow Down
Chart (1980–1989)	Position
Australian Albums (Kent Music Report)	6

== Certifications and sales ==
Certifications and sales for Can't Slow Down
Region	Certification	Certified units/sales
Australia	—	400,000
Belgium (BRMA)	4× Platinum	200,000^{*}
Brazil	—	190,000
Canada (Music Canada)	Diamond	1,000,000^{^}
Finland (Musiikkituottajat)	Platinum	50,608
France (SNEP)	Gold	100,000^{*}
Germany (BVMI)	Gold	250,000^{^}
Hong Kong (IFPI Hong Kong)	Platinum	20,000^{*}
Netherlands (NVPI)	Platinum	100,000^{^}
New Zealand (RMNZ)	Platinum	15,000^{^}
South Africa	—	200,000
Spain (Promusicae)	Gold	50,000^{^}
United Kingdom (BPI)	3× Platinum	1,891,896
United States (RIAA)	Diamond	10,000,000^{^}
Summaries
Worldwide	—	20,000,000
^{*} Sales figures based on certification alone.^{^} Shipments figures based on certification alone.

== See also ==
- List of best-selling albums
- List of best-selling albums in the United States
