= Say You, Say Me =

1985 single by Lionel Richie

- Standard picture sleeve

Single by Lionel Richie

from the album White Nights: Original Motion Picture Soundtrack and Dancing on the Ceiling
- B-side: "Can't Slow Down"
- Released: October 29, 1985
- Genre: Pop
- Length: 4:03
- Label: Motown
- Songwriter: Lionel Richie
- Producers: Lionel Richie; James Anthony Carmichael

Lionel Richie singles chronology
| "Penny Lover" (1984) | "Say You, Say Me" (1985) | "Dancing on the Ceiling" (1986) |

Audio
- "Say You, Say Me" on YouTube

"Say You, Say Me" is a song written and recorded by American singer and songwriter Lionel Richie for the film White Nights. The single hit number one on the Billboard Hot 100 and on the Hot Black Singles chart in December 1985. It also became Richie's ninth number-one on the Billboard Adult Contemporary chart. The track is not available on the film's soundtrack album, as Motown did not want Richie's first single following the massive success of his 1983 album Can't Slow Down to appear on another label. It was included by Motown on Richie's 1986 release Dancing on the Ceiling.

== Development and production ==
For the 1985 film White Nights, a ballet drama starring Mikhail Baryshnikov and Gregory Hines, director Taylor Hackford asked Richie to write a title theme. Unable to compose a song with "White Nights" in the title, Richie submitted a demo of the ballad "Say You, Say Me". Eventually, Hackford approved the song and included the completed version in White Nights. Produced by Richie and James Anthony Carmichael, the song was primarily recorded in Richie's living room. "Say You, Say Me" made its official radio debut in Chicago, Illinois, on then-Top 40 radio station WLS-FM on October 15, in connection of the White Nights world premiere at the 1985 Chicago International Film Festival. In the movie itself, "Say You, Say Me" was introduced over the closing credits.

== Music video ==
A music video, also directed by Hackford, was made for the song. It featured inserted clips from White Nights.

== Critical reception ==
For The New York Times in 1986, Stephen Holden called the song "a powerful mid-80's echo of the Beatles' late-60's chant-like ballads." In a mixed review of Dancing on the Ceiling, Mike Joyce of The Washington Post called the song "silly and horrendously overexposed."

In a 2007 retrospective of the January 11, 1986 Billboard Hot 100 chart, Whitney Pastorek of Entertainment Weekly graded "Say You, Say Me" with an A-minus, calling it "an enduring love song" and commenting "the cranked-up electric bridge alone should be enough to make it a classic."

In 2008, the song was ranked at number 74 of the top songs of all time on the Billboard Hot 100 chart, commemorating the first 50 years of the chart.

== Commercial performance ==
In the US, the "Say You, Say Me" single sold a million copies and was no. 1 for two weeks on the Billboard "Hot Black" chart and for four weeks on the Hot 100.

The single was hugely successful in South Africa, attaining the No. 1 spot on the weekly charts for a total of 30 weeks. It was the No. 1 single of 1986 on the year-end Springbok chart.

== Accolades ==
| Award | Date of ceremony | Category | Result | Ref. |
|---|---|---|---|---|
| Academy Awards | March 24, 1986 | Best Original Song | Won | |
| Golden Globe Awards | January 24, 1986 | Best Original Song | Won | |

== Track listing ==
1. "Say You Say Me" – 3:59
2. "Can't Slow Down" – 4:40

== Personnel ==
- Lionel Richie – vocals, keyboards, rhythm and vocal arrangement
- Greg Phillinganes – keyboards, Minimoog bass
- Michael Boddicker – Yamaha DX7
- Carlos Rios – acoustic guitar
- Steve Lukather – guitar
- Tim May – guitar
- Abraham Laboriel – electric bass guitar
- John Robinson – drums
- Paulinho da Costa – percussion
- Paul Leim – Oberheim DMX and Linn LM-1
- James Anthony Carmichael – rhythm and string arrangement

== Charts ==
=== Weekly charts ===
| Chart (1985–1986) | Peak position |
|---|---|
| Australia (Kent Music Report) | 3 |
| Austria (Ö3 Austria Top 40) | 6 |
| Belgium (Ultratop 50 Flanders) | 2 |
| Belgium (VRT Top 30 Flanders) | 2 |
| Canada Retail Singles (The Record) | 1 |
| Canada Adult Contemporary (RPM) | 1 |
| Canada Top Singles (RPM) | 1 |
| Finland (Suomen virallinen lista) | 1 |
| France (SNEP) | 4 |
| Ireland (IRMA) | 3 |
| Japan (Oricon) | 42 |
| Netherlands (Dutch Top 40) | 2 |
| Netherlands (Single Top 100) | 1 |
| New Zealand (Recorded Music NZ) | 8 |
| Norway (VG-lista) | 1 |
| South Africa (Springbok) | 1 |
| Sweden (Sverigetopplistan) | 1 |
| Switzerland (Schweizer Hitparade) | 1 |
| UK Singles (Official Charts) | 8 |
| US Billboard Hot 100 | 1 |
| US Adult Contemporary (Billboard) | 1 |
| US Hot R&B/Hip-Hop Songs (Billboard) | 1 |
| US Cash Box Top 100 | 1 |
| West Germany (GfK) | 12 |

| Chart (2009) | Peak position |
|---|---|
| Japan (Japan Hot 100) | 25 |

=== Year-end charts ===
| Chart (1985) | Position |
|---|---|
| Belgium (Ultratop 50 Flanders) | 84 |
| Canada Top Singles (RPM) | 42 |
| Netherlands (Dutch Top 40) | 82 |
| Netherlands (Single Top 100) | 39 |

| Chart (1986) | Position |
|---|---|
| Australia (Kent Music Report) | 35 |
| Austria (Ö3 Austria Top 40) | 27 |
| Belgium (Ultratop 50 Flanders) | 45 |
| Canada Top Singles (RPM) | 40 |
| Netherlands (Dutch Top 40) | 91 |
| South Africa (Springbok Radio) | 1 |
| Switzerland (Schweizer Hitparade) | 8 |
| US Billboard Hot 100 | 2 |
| US Adult Contemporary (Billboard) | 2 |
| US Hot Black Singles (Billboard) | 11 |
| US Cash Box Top 100 | 23 |
| West Germany (Media Control) | 49 |

=== All-time charts ===
| Chart (1958–2018) | Position |
|---|---|
| US Billboard Hot 100 | 94 |

== Certifications ==
| Region | Certification | Certified units/sales |
|---|---|---|
| Belgium (BRMA) | Gold | 100,000 |
| Canada (Music Canada) | Platinum | 100,000^{^} |
| Denmark (IFPI Danmark) | Gold | 45,000^{‡} |
| Netherlands (NVPI) | Gold | 75,000^{^} |
| New Zealand (RMNZ) | Gold | 15,000^{‡} |
| Spain (Promusicae) | Gold | 30,000^{‡} |
| United Kingdom (BPI) | Silver | 200,000^{‡} |
| United States (RIAA) | Gold | 1,000,000^{^} |
^{^} Shipments figures based on certification alone.^{‡} Sales+streaming figures based on certification alone.

== Lionel Richie and Rasmus Seebach version ==
"Say You, Say Me"

Single by Lionel Richie and Rasmus Seebach

from the album Tuskegee
- Released: February 24, 2012
- Recorded: 2012
- Genre: Country; pop
- Length: 5:09
- Label: Mercury
- Songwriter: Lionel Richie
- Producers: Dann Huff; Lionel Richie

Lionel Richie singles chronology
| "Endless Love" (2012) | "Say You, Say Me" (2012) |

Rasmus Seebach singles chronology
| "Millionær" (2011) | "Say You, Say Me" (2012) |

Music video
- "Say You, Say Me" on YouTube

In 2012, Lionel Richie re-recorded the song with Danish pop singer-songwriter Rasmus Seebach. The duet is featured on Richie's album Tuskegee, for which Richie has picked a host of best-selling singers from around the world in collaborations. The album version features American country singer Jason Aldean.

=== Track listing ===
1. "Say You, Say Me" – 5:09

=== Charts ===
| Chart (2012) | Peak position |
|---|---|
| Denmark (Tracklisten) | 3 |

== See also ==
- List of number-one singles and albums in Sweden
- List of number-one singles of the 1980s (Switzerland)
- List of number-one adult contemporary singles of 1985 (U.S.)
- List of number-one adult contemporary singles of 1986 (U.S.)
- List of Billboard Hot 100 number-one singles of 1985
- List of Billboard Hot 100 number-one singles of 1986
- List of number-one R&B singles of 1986 (U.S.)
- List of number-one singles of 1985 (Canada)
- List of number-one singles of 1986 (Canada)
