= Running with the Night =

Single by Lionel Richie

from the album Can't Slow Down
- B-side: "Serves You Right"
- Released: November 1983
- Genre: Rock; R&B
- Length: 4:05 (single version); 6:02 (album version)
- Label: Motown
- Songwriters: Lionel Richie; Cynthia Weil
- Producers: Lionel Richie; James Anthony Carmichael

Lionel Richie singles chronology
"All Night Long (All Night)" (1983)	"Running with the Night" (1983)	"Hello" (1984)

Music video
- "Lionel Richie - Running With The Night" on YouTube

"Running with the Night" is the second single released from American singer and songwriter Lionel Richie's multi-platinum and Grammy Award-winning 1983 album, Can't Slow Down. Richie co-wrote the song with songwriter Cynthia Weil and co-produced it with James Anthony Carmichael.

== Recording ==
The electric guitar solo on "Running with the Night" was played by Steve Lukather, best known as a member of the rock band Toto. Lukather sat down in the studio and the engineer played the basic tracks of the song, for him to hear for the first time, so he could plan his part. As the music played, he jammed along on his instrument. At the conclusion of the tune, he said to the engineer, “Ok, I think I’ve got a handle on this. Let me do one.” Lionel goes, “You just did one. That’s it.” -- I go, “You were recording? No, no, man. I played all over this thing. I was just warming up. I stepped all over the vocals. What are you talking about?” He goes, “No, really, it’s done.” Some adult contemporary stations edited out Lukather's guitar solo. Singer Richard Marx added backing vocals on the track as a session singer; he had also lent his vocals to Richie's "All Night Long (All Night)" and "You Are".

== Reception ==
Released as the follow-up single to Richie's hit "All Night Long (All Night)", "Running with the Night" became another Billboard Hot 100 top ten for the singer, peaking at #7 in early 1984. The song also reached the top ten on two other Billboard charts that year, topping out at #6 on both the adult contemporary and R&B charts. "Running with the Night" also made the top ten on the UK Singles Chart, reaching #9 in January 1984.

In its contemporary review of the single, Cash Box said that "Richie presents a dramatic, smooth, mid-tempo tale of tripping the light fantastic, and he once again proves his ability to synthesize a melting pot of styles." In a positive retrospective review Stephen Thomas Erlewine of AllMusic wrote "he even adds a bit of rock with the sleek nocturnal menace of 'Running With the Night,' one of the best songs here. He doesn't swing for the fences like Michael did in 1982; he makes safe bets, which is more in his character."

== Music video ==
The music video for the song was directed by Bob Giraldi. It begins at a wedding reception, and focuses on a bridesmaid (Sheila E.) who sits alone. It then cuts to Richie and a group of men who pair up with women, except for Richie. They dance through streets and then crash the wedding reception during which Richie then pairs up with the lonely bridesmaid. The wedding guests and Richie's company then dance together.

== Charts ==
=== Weekly charts ===
Chart (1983)	Peak Position
Netherlands (Single Top 100)	8

Chart (1984)	Peak Position
Australia (Kent Music Report)	24
Belgium (Ultratop 50 Flanders)	10
Belgium (VRT Top 30 Flanders)	7
Canada Top Singles (RPM)	12
Canada Adult Contemporary (RPM)	1
Canada (CHUM)	9
Finland (Suomen virallinen lista)	13
Ireland (IRMA)	17
Netherlands (Dutch Top 40)	7
New Zealand (Recorded Music NZ)	33
UK Singles (Official Charts)	9
US Billboard Hot 100	7
US Adult Contemporary (Billboard)	6
US Hot R&B/Hip-Hop Songs (Billboard)	6
US Cash Box Top 100	9
West Germany (GfK)	33

=== Year-end charts ===
Chart (1984)	Rank
Canada Top Singles (RPM)	99
US Billboard Hot 100	53
US Adult Contemporary (Billboard)	39
US Hot R&B/Hip-Hop Songs (Billboard)	44
US Cash Box Top 100	71

== Samples ==
- Rihanna sampled this song on "Push Up On Me", a track from her 2007 album Good Girl Gone Bad. Both Richie and Weil are given songwriter credit.

== In popular culture ==
This song can be heard in the 2002 video game Grand Theft Auto: Vice City on the Flash FM radio station. It is only present in the PlayStation 2 version of the game; it was removed in subsequent versions.
