= Dancing on the Ceiling (Lionel Richie song) =

Single by Lionel Richie

from the album Dancing on the Ceiling
- B-side: "Love Will Find a Way"
- Released: July 15, 1986
- Recorded: 1985
- Genre: Pop
- Length: 4:21
- Label: Motown
- Songwriters: Lionel Richie, Carlos Rios, Michael Frenchik
- Producers: Lionel Richie, James Anthony Carmichael

Lionel Richie singles chronology
"Say You, Say Me" (1985)	"Dancing on the Ceiling" (1986)	"Love Will Conquer All" (1986)

"Dancing on the Ceiling" is a song by American singer-songwriter Lionel Richie. It was written by Richie, Mike Frenchik, and Carlos Rios for Richie's third studio album of the same name (1986), while production was helmed by Richie and James Anthony Carmichael. Released as the album's leading single, it became a worldwide hit, reaching top five in Sweden and Belgium as well as peaking on the top spot on the national singles chart in Norway. It peaked at number two on the US Billboard Hot 100 in September 1986.

== Reception ==
"This [sense of swagger] isn't entirely a good thing, since it means he indulges in silliness [...]" – Stephen Thomas Erlewine, AllMusic. In the early 21st century, Blender magazine published a list of the "50 worst songs of all time", with "Dancing on the Ceiling" listed at No. 20. Despite some negative views expressed since its release, the song remains a regular addition to '80s music nights at clubs and bars.

== Personnel ==
- Lionel Richie – lead vocals, rhythm and vocal arrangements
- John Barnes – acoustic piano
- Michael Boddicker – synthesizers
- Carlos Rios – synthesizers, guitars, rhythm arrangements
- Steve MacMillan – door creak effects
- Ken Caillat – sound effects
- Tom Jones – sound effects
- Neil Stubenhaus – bass guitar
- John Robinson – drums
- James Anthony Carmichael – horn and rhythm arrangements
- Maxi Anderson, Billie Barnum, Melinda Chatman, David Cochrane, Kevin Dorsey, Karen Jackson, Marlena Jeter, Fred Law, Janice Marie, Richard Marx, Brenda Richie, Anita Sherman, Karen Siegel, Alfie Silas, Phyllis St. James, Stephanie Taylor, Deborah Thomas, Carmen Twillie, Julia Waters Tillman and Maxine Waters Willard – backing vocals
- James Anthony Carmichael, David Egerton, Wayne Hargrave, Linda Jenner, Steve MacMillan, Greg Phillinganes, Kathi Pogoda, Cheryl Pyle, Carlos Rios, Maximo Rios, Dave Rosen, Kelly Ryan and Wibert Terrell – hoopa hollers

== Music video ==
The accompanying music video for "Dancing on the Ceiling" was directed by Stanley Donen who also co-produced it with Glenn Goodwin through Glenn Goodwin & Associates. Michael Peters choreographed and Daniel Pearl was the director of photography. Shooting took place during three days at Laird Studios in Culver City and one day on location at the LeMondrian Hotel in West Hollywood. The video reportedly cost somewhere between $350,000 and $500,000 (or around $400,000), making it the most expensive short form music video production at the time.

In the video, which premiered on September 8, 1986, Richie and friends attend a party and dance on the ceiling reminiscent of Fred Astaire's routine in Donen's 1951 film Royal Wedding. Donen later said that Richie actually adapted easier and quicker to the rotating room used in the video than Astaire did while shooting Royal Wedding. There is also a reference in the video to The Seven Year Itch when air blows a woman's skirt over her head. At the end Rodney Dangerfield and Cheech Marin make cameo appearances. The video also features dancer Diane Alexander, who would later become Richie's second wife.

In the fall of 1986 HBO aired a half-hour TV special, Lionel Richie: The Making of Dancing on the Ceiling, directed by Sandra Hay and Alan J. Kozlowski, which takes a look at behind the scenes of the music video shoot. This documentary was also released on VHS and LaserDisc by Lorimar Home Video, and later as a hidden extra on Richie's The Definitive Collection DVD.

== Track listings ==
- 7" single
1. "Dancing on the Ceiling" - 4:20
2. "Love Will Find a Way" - 6:10
- 12" single
1. "Dancing on the Ceiling" - 7:10
2. "Love Will Find a Way" - 6:14

== Charts ==
=== Weekly charts ===
Chart (1986)	Peak position
Australia (Kent Music Report)	2
Austria (Ö3 Austria Top 40)	11
Belgium (Ultratop 50 Flanders)	4
Canada (The Record)	2
Canada Top Singles (RPM)	3
Finland (Suomen virallinen lista)	3
France (SNEP)	42
Netherlands (Dutch Top 40)	14
Netherlands (Single Top 100)	8
New Zealand (Recorded Music NZ)	7
Norway (VG-lista)	1
South Africa (Springbok)	1
Sweden (Sverigetopplistan)	3
Switzerland (Schweizer Hitparade)	6
UK Singles (Official Charts)	7
US Billboard Hot 100	2
US Adult Contemporary (Billboard)	3
West Germany (GfK)	13

=== Year-end charts ===
Chart (1986)	Position
Australia (Kent Music Report)	15
Belgium (Ultratop Flanders)	15
Netherlands (Dutch Top 40)	81
Netherlands (Single Top 100)	37
US Billboard Hot 100	39
US Adult Contemporary (Billboard)	22

== Certifications ==
Region	Certification	Certified units/sales
Canada (Music Canada)	Gold	50,000^{^}
New Zealand (RMNZ)	Gold	15,000^{‡}
United Kingdom (BPI)	Platinum	600,000^{‡}
^{^} Shipments figures based on certification alone.^{‡} Sales+streaming figures based on certification alone.
