= Lionel Richie discography =

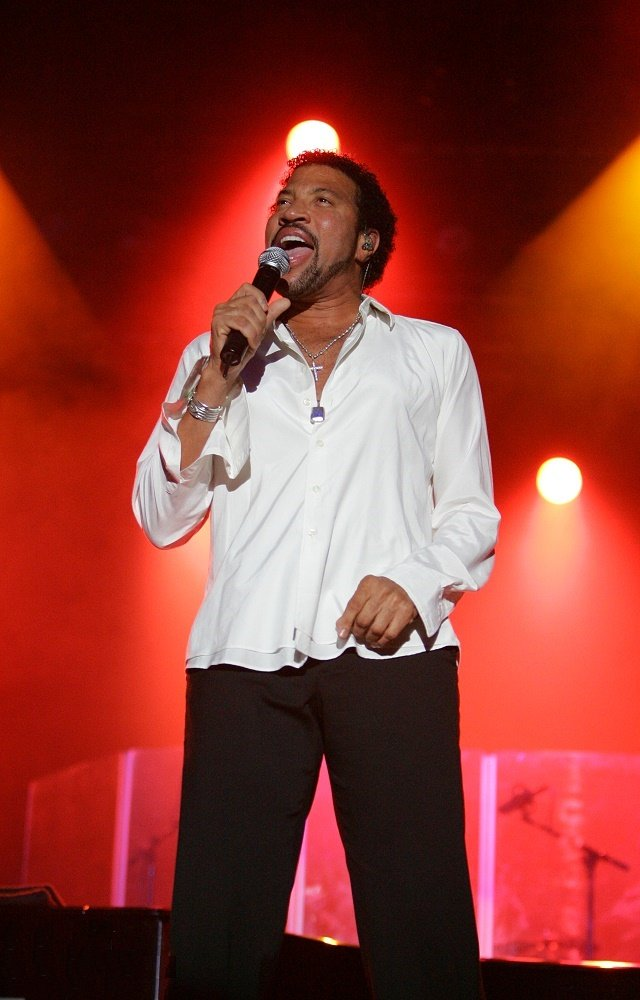
- Richie performing at the Chumash Casino Resort in Santa Ynes, California, on July 6, 2006
- Studio albums: 11
- Live albums: 4
- Compilation albums: 6
- Singles: 42

The American singer Lionel Richie has released 11 studio albums, three live albums, and seven compilation albums. Formerly the lead vocalist of The Commodores, Richie began a solo career in the early 1980s and has released over 40 singles, five of which became number-one hits on the US Billboard Hot 100.

Richie's first three studio albums have all been certified "Multi-Platinum" by the Recording Industry Association of America. His second album, Can't Slow Down, is his most successful, being certified 10× Platinum (i.e. Diamond) in the US. The album spent 59 consecutive weeks inside the Billboard Top 10 (including the entire year of 1984) and a total of 160 weeks (over three years) on the Billboard 200 chart. It became the third best-selling album of 1984, and eventually sold over 20 million copies worldwide.

In addition to multiple pop, R&B, and adult contemporary hit singles, two of his singles reached the Top 30 of the Hot Country Singles & Tracks chart (now Hot Country Songs). "Deep River Woman", which features country music group Alabama, was a Top 10 hit on the country music charts in 1987.

Richie's eleventh studio album, Tuskegee, was released in 2012 and peaked at number one on the US Billboard 200, making it his third number one album on the chart.

== Albums ==
=== Studio albums ===
List of albums, with selected chart positions, and certifications
Title	Album details	Peak chart positions											Certifications
Title	Album details	US	US R&B	AUS	CAN	GER	NLD	NZ	NOR	SWE	SWI	UK	Certifications
Lionel Richie	Released: October 6, 1982; Label: Motown; Format: LP, Cassette, 8-track, CD	3	1	18	5	—	21	3	—	41	—	9	US: 4× Platinum; CAN: 4× Platinum; UK: Platinum
Can't Slow Down	Released: October 14, 1983; Label: Motown; Format: LP, Cassette, Reel-to-Reel, 8-track, CD	1	1	1	1	2	1	1	3	2	3	1	US: Diamond (10× Platinum); CAN: Diamond (10× Platinum); FRA: Gold; GER: Gold; NZ: Gold; UK: 3× Platinum
Dancing on the Ceiling	Released: August 5, 1986; Label: Motown; Format: LP, Cassette, 8-track, CD	1	3	2	3	5	2	3	1	2	2	2	US: 4× Platinum; CAN: 3× Platinum; FRA: 2× Gold; UK: 2× Platinum
Louder Than Words	Released: April 16, 1996; Label: Mercury; Format: CD, Cassette, DCC	28	15	32	25	26	6	31	29	21	10	11	US: Gold; FRA: Gold; UK: Silver
Time	Released: June 23, 1998; Label: Mercury; Format: CD, Cassette, digital download	152	77	174	—	15	71	—	—	—	9	31	
Renaissance	Released: October 16, 2000; Label: Island; Format: CD, HDCD, Cassette	62	54	—	—	3	10	—	24	45	6	6	GER: Platinum; NVPI: Platinum; SWI: Gold; UK: Platinum
Just for You	Released: May 4, 2004; Label: Island; Format: CD, SACD, Cassette	47	22	44	—	10	21	—	—	—	8	5	UK: Gold
Coming Home	Released: September 12, 2006; Label: Island; Format: CD, digital download, Cassette	6	3	—	33	8	20	—	—	—	9	15	US: Gold; UK: Gold
Sounds of the Season	Released: December 4, 2006; Label: Island; Format: CD, digital download	—	—	—	—	—	—	—	—	—	—	—	
Just Go	Released: February 17, 2009; Label: Island; Format: CD, digital download	24	9	—	—	9	22	—	—	—	28	10	UK: Silver
Tuskegee	Released: March 5, 2012; Label: Mercury Nashville; Format: CD	1	—	2	1	7	7	6	26	10	31	7	US: Platinum; AUS: Gold; CAN: Platinum; UK: Gold
"—" denotes album that did not chart or was not released

=== Live albums ===
List of albums, with selected chart positions, and certifications
Title	Album details	Peak chart positions								Certifications
Title	Album details	US	US R&B	AUS	GER	NLD	SWE	SWI	UK	Certifications
Encore	Released: November 26, 2002; Label: Island; Format: CD, Cassette	—	—	198	23	28	16	10	8	SWI: Gold; UK: Platinum
Live in Paris / Live – His Greatest Hits and More	Released: September 24, 2007; Label: Mercury; Format: CD	—	54	—	39	—	—	—	91	
Symphonica in Rosso	Released: 2008; Label: Universal Music; Format: CD	—	—	—	—	1	—	—	—	NVPI: Platinum
Hello from Las Vegas	Released: August 16, 2019; Label: Universal Music; Format: CD, LP, digital download	2	—	—	—	—	—	—	—	
"—" denotes album that did not chart or was not released

=== Compilation albums ===
List of albums, with selected chart positions, and certifications
Title	Album details	Peak chart positions											Certifications
Title	Album details	US	US R&B	AUS	CAN	GER	NLD	NZ	NOR	SWE	SWI	UK	Certifications
Back to Front	Released: May 5, 1992; Label: Motown; Format: CD, LP, Cassette, DCC	19	7	1	13	2	1	1	2	22	3	1	US: Platinum; AUS: 2× Platinum; FRA: 3× Platinum; GER: Platinum; SWI: 2× Platinum; UK: 4× Platinum
Truly: The Love Songs	Released: November 25, 1997; Label: Motown; Format: CD, Cassette, SACD	—	—	74	—	73	22	35	—	8	34	5	US: Gold; FRA: Gold; UK: Platinum
The Definitive Collection	Released: 2003; Label: Universal Music TV / Motown; Format: CD, Cassette, LP	19	31	16	—	40	23	7	4	31	45	1	US: Platinum; AUS: Platinum; UK: 5× Platinum
20th Century Masters – The Millennium Collection: The Best of Lionel Richie	Released: October 7, 2003; Label: Motown; Format: CD	63	—	—	30	—	—	—	—	—	—	—	UK: Silver
Gold	Released: January 10, 2006; Label: Hip-O/Motown; Format: CD	—	—	—	—	—	—	—	—	—	—	147	
Soul Legends	Released: July 25, 2006; Label: Motown; Format: CD	—	—	—	—	—	—	—	—	—	—	—	
The Best Collection	Released: November 24, 2009; Label: Universal Music; Format: CD	—	—	—	—	—	—	—	—	—	—	—	
"—" denotes album that did not chart or was not released

== Singles ==
List of singles, with selected chart positions and certifications
Title	Year	Peak chart positions										Certifications (sales threshold)	Album
Title	Year	US	US R&B	US AC	US Dance	US Country	AUS	GER	JPN	NL	UK	Certifications (sales threshold)	Album
"Endless Love" (with Diana Ross)	1981	1	1	1	—	—	1	—	—	10	7	US: Platinum; CAN: Platinum; NZ: Platinum; UK: Platinum	Endless Love: Original Motion Picture Soundtrack
"Truly"	1982	1	2	1	—	—	7	—	—	—	6	US: Gold; CAN: Platinum; UK: Silver	Lionel Richie
"You Are"	1983	4	2	1	—	—	17	—	—	29	43		Lionel Richie
"My Love"	1983	5	6	1	—	—	88	—	—	—	70		Lionel Richie
"All Night Long (All Night)"	1983	1	1	1	5	—	1	2	—	1	2	US: Gold; CAN: Platinum; NZ: 3× Platinum; UK: 2× Platinum	Can't Slow Down
"Running with the Night"	1983	7	6	6	—	—	24	33	—	8	9		Can't Slow Down
"Hello"	1984	1	1	1	—	—	1	2	—	1	1	US: Gold; NZ: Gold; UK: Platinum	Can't Slow Down
"Stuck on You"	1984	3	8	1	—	24	24	45	—	18	12	NZ: Platinum; UK: Gold	Can't Slow Down
"Penny Lover"	1984	8	8	1	—	—	73	37	—	14	18		Can't Slow Down
"Say You, Say Me"	1985	1	1	1	—	—	3	12	25	1	8	US: Gold; CAN: Platinum; NZ: Gold; UK: Silver	Dancing On the Ceiling
"Dancing on the Ceiling"	1986	2	6	3	—	—	2	13	—	8	7	UK: Platinum; CAN: Gold; NZ: Platinum	Dancing On the Ceiling
"Love Will Conquer All"	1986	9	2	1	—	—	71	—	—	24	45		Dancing On the Ceiling
"Ballerina Girl"	1986	7	5	1	—	—	43	66	—	39	17		Dancing On the Ceiling
"Deep River Woman" (with Alabama)	1987	71	—	28	—	10	—	—	—	—	—		Dancing On the Ceiling
"Se La"	1987	20	12	5	—	—	—	41	—	12	43		Dancing On the Ceiling
"Do It to Me"	1992	21	1	3	—	—	45	26	—	12	33		Back to Front
"My Destiny"	1992	—	56	7	—	—	125	23	—	1	7	UK: Silver	Back to Front
"Love, Oh Love"	1992	—	—	—	—	—	165	71	—	15	52		Back to Front
"Don't Wanna Lose You"	1996	39	17	5	—	—	53	66	—	28	17		Louder Than Words
"Ordinary Girl"	1996	— (Note: "Ordinary Girl" did not enter the Billboard Hot 100, but peaked at number one on the Bubbling Under Hot 100 Singles chart.)	76	9	—	—	—	—	—	—	147		Louder Than Words
"Still in Love"	1996	—	—	10	—	—	—	—	—	—	66		Louder Than Words
"Climbing"	1996	—	—	—	—	—	—	—	—	45	—		Louder Than Words
"Time"	1998	—	—	7	—	—	—	—	—	—	—		Time
"I Hear Your Voice"	1998	—	—	15	—	—	—	—	—	—	—		Time
"Closest Thing to Heaven"	1998	—	—	—	—	—	—	99	—	98	26		Time
"Angel"	2000	70	—	4	32	—	123	9	—	6	18	NVPI: Gold	Renaissance
"Don't Stop the Music"	2000	—	—	—	—	—	—	68	—	73	34		Renaissance
"Tender Heart"	2001	—	—	—	—	—	—	—	—	—	29		Renaissance
"I Forgot"	2001	—	—	—	—	—	—	—	—	—	34		Renaissance
"Cinderella"	2001	—	—	—	—	—	—	74	—	82	—		Renaissance
"The One" (with Juliette)	2001	—	—	—	—	—	—	—	—	—	—		Renaissance
"To Love a Woman" (with Enrique Iglesias)	2003	—	—	—	—	—	—	52	—	—	19		Encore
"Just for You"	2004	92	—	6	14	—	—	24	—	47	20		Just for You
"Long Long Way to Go"	2004	—	—	20	—	—	—	54	—	93	—		Just for You
"I Call It Love"	2006	62	19	9	10	—	—	29	—	93	45		Coming Home
"What You Are"	2006	—	57	—	—	—	—	—	—	—	—		Coming Home
"Why"	2006	—	—	—	—	—	—	—	—	—	143		Coming Home
"Reason to Believe"	2007	—	—	—	—	—	—	76	—	—	—		Coming Home
"All Around the World"	2007	—	—	—	6	—	—	—	—	—	—		Coming Home
"Face in the Crowd" (with Trijntje Oosterhuis)	2008	—	—	—	—	—	—	—	—	3	—		Just Go
"Good Morning"	2008	—	120	—	—	—	—	67	—	—	—		Just Go
"Just Go"	2009	—	116	11	18	—	—	—	97	—	52		Just Go
"I'm in Love"	2009	—	101	—	—	—	—	—	—	—	—		Just Go
"All Night Long 2011" (featuring Guy Sebastian)	2011	—	—	—	—	—	26	—	—	—	—		Non-album single
"Endless Love" (with Shania Twain)	2012	— (Note: "Endless Love" did not enter the Billboard Hot 100, but peaked at number 16 on the Bubbling Under Hot 100 Singles chart.)	—	12	—	—	—	—	—	—	—		Tuskegee
"Say You, Say Me" (with Rasmus Seebach)	2012	—	—	—	—	—	—	—	—	—	—		Tuskegee
"—" denotes releases that did not chart or were not released to that country

== Other charted songs ==
Title	Year	Peak positions	Album
Title	Year	US Country	Album
"Deep River Woman" (with Little Big Town)	2012	60	Tuskegee

== Music videos ==
Year	Video
1982	"Truly"
1983	"You Are"
1983	"My Love"
1983	"All Night Long (All Night)"
1983	"Running with the Night"
1984	"Hello"
1984	"Penny Lover"
1985	"Say You, Say Me"
1986	"Dancing on the Ceiling"
1986	"Love Will Conquer All"
1986	"Ballerina Girl"
1987	"Se La"
1992	"Do It to Me"
1992	"My Destiny"
1992	"Love, Oh Love"
1996	"Don't Wanna Lose You"
1996	"Ordinary Girl"
1998	"Time"
2000	"Angel"
2000	"Don't Stop the Music"
2001	"Cinderella"
2003	"To Love a Woman"
2004	"Just for You"
2006	"I Call It Love"
2009	"Just Go"
2012	"Endless Love"
