= The Definitive Collection (Lionel Richie album) =

Greatest hits album by Lionel Richie
- Released: February 4, 2003
- Recorded: 1974–2002
- Genre: Pop; R&B; dance-pop; soul
- Length: 78:31
- Label: Motown

Lionel Richie chronology
Encore (2002)	The Definitive Collection (2003)	20th Century Masters – The Millennium Collection: The Best of Lionel Richie (2003)

Professional ratings
Review scores
Source	Rating
AllMusic	4.5/5 stars

The Definitive Collection is a compilation album by American singer-songwriter Lionel Richie, released in 2003 by Motown. It compiles the hit singles from Richie's solo career, as well as select singles released during his time with the Commodores.

The album was initially released in North America as a single-disc compilation in February 2003; a limited edition release included a bonus disc with rare extra tracks. A two-disc edition was released for the international market which collects 38 songs over 20 years. A special edition of the album was released later which includes a DVD selecting highlights throughout this period of Richie's career. The DVD also includes a live performance from Amsterdam and the making of the Dancing on the Ceiling music video, as a hidden extra.

The album was unusual in that it hit the number-one spot on the UK Albums Chart twelve years after it was first released, following a live performance by Richie described as "triumphant" at Glastonbury Festival 2015. It became his first UK number one in 23 years.

== Track listing ==
=== North American version ===
All tracks are written by Lionel Richie, except where noted.

No.	Title	Writer(s)	Original release	Length
1.	"Hello"		Can't Slow Down, 1983	4:08
2.	"Just to Be Close to You" (Commodores) (single version)		Hot on the Tracks, 1976	3:30
3.	"Easy" (Commodores)		Commodores, 1977	4:15
4.	"Running with the Night" (single version)	Richie; Cynthia Weil	Can't Slow Down	4:09
5.	"Three Times a Lady" (Commodores) (single version)		Natural High, 1978	3:37
6.	"Still" (Commodores) (single version)		Midnight Magic, 1979	3:44
7.	"All Night Long (All Night)" (single version)		Can't Slow Down	4:22
8.	"Endless Love" (with Diana Ross)		Endless Love OST, 1981	4:25
9.	"Truly"		Lionel Richie, 1982	3:19
10.	"Penny Lover" (single version)	Richie; Brenda Harvey-Richie	Can't Slow Down	3:49
11.	"You Are" (single version)	Richie; Harvey-Richie	Lionel Richie	4:06
12.	"Sail On" (Commodores) (single version)		Midnight Magic	4:00
13.	"Stuck on You"		Can't Slow Down	3:12
14.	"Say You, Say Me"		Dancing on the Ceiling, 1986	4:01
15.	"Dancing on the Ceiling"	Richie; Carlos Rios; Michael Frenchik	Dancing on the Ceiling	4:32
16.	"Do It to Me" (single version)		Back to Front, 1992	4:30
17.	"Ballerina Girl"		Dancing on the Ceiling	3:36
18.	"Angel" (single version)	Richie; Paul Barry; Mark Taylor	Renaissance, 2000	3:43
19.	"To Love a Woman" (with Enrique Iglesias)	Richie; Barry; Iglesias	Encore, 2002	3:54
20.	"Goodbye"		Encore	3:39
Total length:				78:31

Limited edition bonus disc
No.	Title	Writer(s)	Original release	Length
1.	"Zoom" (Commodores) (unreleased alternate mix)	Richie; Ronald LaPread	Commodores	8:15
2.	"Oh No" (Commodores)		In the Pocket, 1981	3:03
3.	"Can't Slow Down" (early working version)	Richie; David Cochrane	Can't Slow Down	5:11
4.	"Lady"		Time, 1998	4:29
5.	"Brick House" (Commodores) (hidden track)		Commodores	3:28

=== International version ===
Disc 1
No.	Title	Writer(s)	Original release	Length
1.	"All Night Long (All Night)"		Can't Slow Down	4:23
2.	"Say You, Say Me"		Dancing on the Ceiling	4:04
3.	"My Destiny"		Back to Front	4:51
4.	"Running with the Night"	Richie; Weil	Can't Slow Down	4:10
5.	"Dancing on the Ceiling"	Richie; Rios; Frenchik	Dancing on the Ceiling	4:36
6.	"Don't Stop the Music"	Richie; Barry; Taylor	Renaissance	4:16
7.	"Love, Oh Love"	Richie; Harvey-Richie	Back to Front	5:49
8.	"Ballerina Girl"		Dancing on the Ceiling	3:39
9.	"Love Will Conquer All"	Richie; Weil; Greg Phillinganes	Dancing on the Ceiling	5:43
10.	"Do It to Me"		Back to Front	4:31
11.	"Cinderella"	Richie; Joe Wolfe	Renaissance	3:43
12.	"Tender Heart"	Richie; Barry; Billy Lawrie	Renaissance	4:30
13.	"Don't Wanna Lose You"	Richie; James Harris III; Terry Lewis	Louder Than Words, 1996	4:59
14.	"The Closest Thing to Heaven"	Diane Warren	Time	4:02
15.	"I Forgot"	Richie; Patrice Guirao; Pascal Obispo	Renaissance	4:54
16.	"Angel"	Richie; Barry; Taylor	Renaissance	3:44
17.	"To Love a Woman" (with Enrique Iglesias)	Richie; Barry; Iglesias	Encore	3:54
18.	"Goodbye"		Encore	3:39

UK version disc 1
No.	Title	Writer(s)	Original release	Length
1.	"All Night Long (All Night)"		Can't Slow Down	4:19
2.	"Say You, Say Me"		Dancing on the Ceiling	4:02
3.	"My Destiny"		Back to Front	4:50
4.	"Running with the Night"	Richie; Weil	Can't Slow Down	4:10
5.	"Dancing on the Ceiling"	Richie; Rios; Frenchik	Dancing on the Ceiling	4:31
6.	"Don't Stop the Music"	Richie; Barry; Taylor	Renaissance	4:15
7.	"Love, Oh Love"	Richie; Harvey-Richie	Back to Front	5:48
8.	"Ballerina Girl"		Dancing on the Ceiling	3:38
9.	"My Love"		Lionel Richie	4:06
10.	"Love Will Conquer All"	Richie; Weil; Phillinganes	Dancing on the Ceiling	5:41
11.	"Do It to Me"		Back to Front	4:31
12.	"Cinderella"	Richie; Joe Wolfe	Renaissance	3:40
13.	"Tender Heart"	Richie; Barry; Billy Lawrie	Renaissance	4:29
14.	"Don't Wanna Lose You"	Richie; Harris; Lewis	Louder Than Words	4:33
15.	"The Closest Thing to Heaven"	Warren	Time	4:00
16.	"I Forgot"	Richie; Guirao; Obispo	Renaissance	4:53
17.	"Angel"	Richie; Barry; Taylor	Renaissance	4:15
18.	"To Love a Woman" (with Enrique Iglesias)	Richie; Barry; Iglesias	Encore	3:54
Total length:				79:46

Disc 2
No.	Title	Writer(s)	Original release	Length
1.	"Three Times a Lady" (Commodores)		Natural High	3:41
2.	"Easy" (Commodores)		Commodores	4:16
3.	"Endless Love" (with Diana Ross)		Endless Love OST	4:27
4.	"Hello"		Can't Slow Down	4:10
5.	"Still" (Commodores)		Midnight Magic	3:45
6.	"Sail On" (Commodores)		Midnight Magic	4:04
7.	"Stuck on You"		Can't Slow Down	3:12
8.	"You Are"	Richie; Harvey-Richie	Lionel Richie	4:08
9.	"Truly"		Lionel Richie	3:21
10.	"Just to Be Close to You" (Commodores)		Hot on the Tracks	3:35
11.	"Sweet Love" (Commodores)		Movin' On, 1975	3:28
12.	"Penny Lover"	Richie; Harvey-Richie	Can't Slow Down	3:47
13.	"Oh No" (Commodores)		In the Pocket	3:02
14.	"Lady (You Bring Me Up)" (Commodores)	Harold Hudson; William King; Shirley Hanna-King	In the Pocket	4:03
15.	"Wonderland" (Commodores)	Milan Williams	Midnight Magic	3:49
16.	"Machine Gun" (Commodores) (instrumental)	Williams	Machine Gun, 1974	2:40
17.	"Brick House" (Commodores)	Richie; Williams; Walter Orange; LaPread; Thomas McClary; King	Commodores	3:34
18.	"Too Hot ta Trot" (Commodores)	Richie; Williams; Orange; LaPread; McClary; King	Commodores Live!, 1977	3:31
19.	"Flying High" (Commodores)	Richie; McClary	Natural High	3:54
20.	"Zoom" (Commodores)	Richie; LaPread	Commodores	4:21
Total length:				77:05

=== DVD ===
1. "My Destiny"
2. "All Night Long (All Night)"
3. "Love Will Conquer All"
4. "You Are"
5. "Say You, Say Me"
6. "Dancing on the Ceiling"
7. "Running with the Night"
8. "Penny Lover"
9. "Hello"
10. "Ballerina Girl"
11. "Se La"
12. "Love, Oh Love"
13. "Truly"
14. "Do It to Me"
15. "Three Times a Lady" (live in Amsterdam)

== Charts ==
=== Weekly charts ===
Chart (2003)	Peak position
Canadian Albums (Nielsen SoundScan)	22
Canadian R&B Albums (Nielsen SoundScan)	10
Irish Albums (IRMA)	32
Scottish Albums (OCC)	18
UK Albums (OCC)	10
US Billboard 200	19
Chart (2004)	Peak position
Australian Albums (ARIA)	16
Austrian Albums (Ö3 Austria)	61
Belgian Albums (Ultratop Flanders)	31
Dutch Albums (Album Top 100)	23
German Albums (Offizielle Top 100)	40
Italian Albums (FIMI)	30
Swedish Albums (Sverigetopplistan)	31
Swiss Albums (Schweizer Hitparade)	45
Chart (2005)	Peak position
Norwegian Albums (VG-lista)	4
Chart (2006)	Peak position
New Zealand Albums (RMNZ)	7
Chart (2015)	Peak position
Scottish Albums (OCC)	1
UK Albums (OCC)	1

=== Year-end charts ===
Chart (2003)	Position
UK Albums (OCC)	61
Chart (2004)	Position
UK Albums (OCC)	131
Chart (2015)	Position
UK Albums (OCC)	46

== Certifications ==
Region	Certification	Certified units/sales
Australia (ARIA) album	Platinum	70,000^{^}
Australia (ARIA) video	Platinum	15,000^{^}
Germany (BVMI) album	Gold	100,000^{‡}
New Zealand (RMNZ)	Platinum	15,000^{^}
United Kingdom (BPI)	5× Platinum	1,500,000^{‡}
United States (RIAA)	Platinum	1,000,000^{^}
Summaries
Europe (IFPI)	Platinum	1,000,000^{*}
^{*} Sales figures based on certification alone.^{^} Shipments figures based on certification alone.^{‡} Sales+streaming figures based on certification alone.
