= Tender Heart (Lionel Richie song) =

Single by Lionel Richie

from the album Renaissance
- Released: 2001
- Length: 4:28
- Label: Island Def Jam
- Songwriters: Lionel Richie; Paul Barry; Billy Lawrie
- Producers: Brian Rawling; Mark Taylor

Lionel Richie singles chronology
"Don't Stop the Music" (2000)	"Tender Heart" (2001)	"I Forgot" (2001)

"Tender Heart" is a song by American singer Lionel Richie. It was written by Richie along with Paul Barry and Billy Lawrie for his sixth studio album Renaissance (2001), while production was helmed by Brian Rawling and Mark Taylor. In the United Kingdom, the song was released as the album's third single in 2001 and reached number 29 on the UK Singles Chart.

== Track listing ==
CD maxi single
No.	Title	Writer(s)	Producer(s)	Length
1.	"Tender Heart"	Lionel Richie; Paul Barry; Billy Lawrie	Brian Rawling; Mark Taylor	4:05
2.	"Don't Stop the Music" (Joey Negro Revival Mix Radio Edit)	Richie; Barry; Taylor	Rawling; Taylor; Joey Negro^{[a]}	3:47
3.	"All Night Long" (Hustlers Convention DMC Mix)	Richie	Richie; James Anthony Carmichael; Hustlers Convention^{[a]}	6:21

Notes

- ^{^[a]} signifies an additional producer

== Credits and personnel ==
Credits adapted from the album's liner notes.

- Chris Anderson – assistant engineer
- Paul Barry – acoustic guitar, writer
- Paul Jackson Jr. – additional guitar
- L.M.O. Studio Orchestra – strings
- Billy Lawrie – writer
- Adam Phillips – electric guitar
- Brian Rawling – producer
- Lionel Richie – fender rhodes, vocals, writer
- Mark Taylor – arranger, mixing, producer, recording
- Lionel Richie – vocals, writer
- Robyn Smith – strings arranger
- Dirk Vanoucek – additional recording
- Jong uk Yoon – assistant engineer

== Charts ==
Chart (2001)	Peak position
UK Singles (OCC)	29
