= Encore (Lionel Richie album) =

Live album by Lionel Richie
- Released: November 26, 2002
- Venue: Wembley Arena, London
- Genre: R&B
- Length: 48:33
- Label: Island
- Producer: Richie Jones; Lionel Richie (exec.); Mark Taylor; Ric Wake

Lionel Richie chronology
| Renaissance (2000) | Encore (2002) | The Definitive Collection (2003) |

Encore is a live album by American singer Lionel Richie. It was released by Island Records first on November 26, 2002, in Europe. The album features his May 2001 concert at Wembley Arena in London, as part of his tour in support of his sixth solo studio album Renaissance (2000). Most of the songs on Encore originate from previous studio albums as well as from Richie's repertoire with his former band The Commodores, although he also performed the songs "Angel," "Tender Heart" and "Don't Stop the Music" from the Renaissance album.

Upon release, the album earned a mixed response, with some American reviewers criticizing Island's decision to omit two previously unreleased original tracks, the Ric Wake-produced "Goodbye" and "To Love a Woman," a duet with Spanish singer Enrique Iglesias, from US editions of Encore. A commercial success, the live album reached the top ten in Austria, Switzerland, and the United Kingdom. It was certified double platinum by the British Phonographic Industry (BPI) and gold by the Swiss arm of the International Federation of the Phonographic Industry (IFPI).

== Critical reception ==
Professional ratings
Review scores
| Source | Rating |
|---|---|
| AllMusic | 3/5 stars |

Allmusic editor William Ruhlmann found that "Richie is an engaging cheerleader of a frontman, endlessly encouraging his already enthusiastic listeners with such interjections as "C'mon!," "Yeah!," and "Let's go!." [...] No doubt this show was more enjoyable for Richie fans in the arena than it will be for those listening at home [...] This is a performer who is playing much more to the audience in front of him than to the one that will hear the concert later on disc. Even leaving aside the truncated form of this version of the collection, this is not a memorable live album."

== Track listing ==
International edition
| No. | Title | Writer(s) | Producer(s) | Length |
|---|---|---|---|---|
| 1. | "Hello" | Lionel Richie | | 1:45 |
| 2. | "Running with the Night" | Richie; Cynthia Weil | | 3:14 |
| 3. | "Penny Lover" | Richie; Brenda Harvey-Richie | | 4:00 |
| 4. | "Tender Heart" | Richie; Paul Barry; Billy Lawrie | | 3:35 |
| 5. | "Dancing on the Ceiling" | Richie; Carlos Rios; Michael Frenchik | | 4:55 |
| 6. | "Easy" | Richie | | 5:27 |
| 7. | "Stuck on You" | Richie | | 4:10 |
| 8. | "Brick House" | Richie; Milan Williams; Ronald LaPread; Thomas McClary; Walter Orange; William King | | 4:05 |
| 9. | "Three Times a Lady" | Richie | | 3:40 |
| 10. | "Don't Stop the Music" | Richie; Mark Taylor; Barry | | 4:23 |
| 11. | "All Night Long (All Night)" | Richie | | 5:00 |
| 12. | "Say You, Say Me" | Richie | | 4:21 |
| 13. | "Angel" | Richie; Taylor; Barry | | 2:42 |
| 14. | "Still" | Richie | | 5:10 |
| 15. | "Goodbye" | Richie | Ric Wake | 3:37 |
| 16. | "To Love a Woman" (featuring Enrique Iglesias) | Richie; Iglesias; Barry | Taylor; Wake^{[a]}; Richie Jones^{[b]} | 3:52 |

Notes

- ^{^[a]} signifies a co-producer
- ^{^[b]} signifies an additional producer

== Charts ==
=== Weekly charts ===
| Chart (2002–2003) | Peak position |
|---|---|
| Australian Albums (ARIA) | 198 |
| Austrian Albums (Ö3 Austria) | 4 |
| Belgian Albums (Ultratop Wallonia) | 14 |
| Dutch Albums (Album Top 100) | 28 |
| French Albums (SNEP) | 14 |
| German Albums (Offizielle Top 100) | 23 |
| Swedish Albums (Sverigetopplistan) | 16 |
| Swiss Albums (Schweizer Hitparade) | 10 |
| UK Albums (OCC) | 8 |

=== Year-end charts ===
| Chart (2002) | Position |
|---|---|
| UK Albums (OCC) | 65 |
| Chart (2003) | Position |
| French Albums (SNEP) | 177 |

== Certifications ==
| Region | Certification | Certified units/sales |
|---|---|---|
| Germany (BVMI) | Gold | 150,000^{‡} |
| Switzerland (IFPI Switzerland) | Gold | 20,000^{^} |
| United Kingdom (BPI) | Platinum | 300,000^{^} |
^{^} Shipments figures based on certification alone.^{‡} Sales+streaming figures based on certification alone.
