= Truly: The Love Songs =

Compilation album by Lionel Richie
- Released: November 25, 1997
- Length: 55:19; 76:58 (International version)
- Label: Motown
- Producer: Lionel Richie

Lionel Richie chronology
Louder Than Words (1996)	Truly: The Love Songs (1997)	Time (1998)

Truly: The Love Songs is the second compilation album by Lionel Richie, released on November 25, 1997. The international version included the tracks "My Destiny", "Don't Wanna Lose You", "Ballerina Girl", "Still in Love", and "Oh No". Many of the tracks included on this album were performed with the Commodores.

Professional ratings
Review scores
Source	Rating
Allmusic	link

== Track listing ==
All romantic love songs by Lionel Richie, unless stated otherwise.

1. "Hello"
2. "Penny Lover"
3. "Three Times a Lady" (The Commodores)
4. "Just to Be Close to You" (The Commodores)
5. "Still" (The Commodores)
6. "Sail On" (The Commodores)
7. "Easy" (The Commodores)
8. "Endless Love" (Richie/Diana Ross)
9. "Truly"
10. "Love Will Conquer All"
11. "Say You, Say Me"
12. "Do It to Me"
13. "Sweet Love" (The Commodores)
14. "Stuck on You"

=== International version ===
1. "My Destiny"
2. "Endless Love" (Richie/Diana Ross)
3. "Three Times a Lady" (The Commodores)
4. "Don't Wanna Lose You"
5. "Hello"
6. "Sail On" (The Commodores)
7. "Easy" (The Commodores)
8. "Say You, Say Me"
9. "Do It to Me"
10. "Penny Lover"
11. "Truly"
12. "Still" (The Commodores)
13. "Love Will Conquer All"
14. "Sweet Love" (The Commodores)
15. "Ballerina Girl"
16. "Still in Love"
17. "Oh No" (The Commodores)
18. "Just to Be Close to You" (The Commodores)
19. "Stuck on You"

== Charts ==
Chart performance for Truly: The Love Songs
Chart (1997–1998)	Peak position
Australian Albums (ARIA)	74
Austrian Albums (Ö3 Austria)	33
Dutch Albums (Album Top 100)	22
German Albums (Offizielle Top 100)	73
New Zealand Albums (RMNZ)	35
Swedish Albums (Sverigetopplistan)	8
Swiss Albums (Schweizer Hitparade)	34
UK Albums (OCC)	8

== Certifications ==
Certifications for Truly: The Love Songs
Region	Certification	Certified units/sales
Brazil (Pro-Música Brasil)	Gold	100,000^{*}
France (SNEP)	Gold	100,000^{*}
United Kingdom (BPI)	Platinum	300,000^{^}
United States (RIAA)	Gold	500,000^{^}
^{*} Sales figures based on certification alone.^{^} Shipments figures based on certification alone.
