= All the Great Hits (Commodores album) =

Compilation album by Commodores
- Released: November 5, 1982
- Studios: Motown/Hitsville U.S.A. Recording Studios (Hollywood, California); Web IV Studios (Atlanta, Georgia)
- Genres: Funk; soul
- Length: 37:09
- Label: Motown
- Producers: James Anthony Carmichael; Commodores

Commodores chronology
Love Songs (1981)	All the Great Hits (1982)	Commodores 13 (1983)

All the Great Hits is a compilation album by the Commodores, released in 1982 by Motown Records. The album was certified Gold in the US by the RIAA for selling over 500,000 copies.

== Background ==
All the Great Hits consists of Commodores' hit singles, like "Three Times a Lady" and "Still". Along with two new songs, "Painted Picture" and "Reach High".

"Painted Picture" was released as a single by Motown. The song peaked at No. 19 on the US Billboard Hot R&B Singles chart.

== Critical reception ==
Professional ratings
Review scores
Source	Rating
AllMusic	4/5 stars
Rolling Stone	4/5 stars

With a 4 out of 5 stars rating, Stephen Thomas Erlewine of AllMusic praised the album saying "While there are many Commodores greatest-hits packages available, All the Great Hits offers most of their biggest hits, making it ideal for the casual fan."

Dave Marsh of Rolling Stone gave the album a 4 out of 5 stars rating. Marsh took note that "the real genius of the group has been in appropriating the stylistic devices of country-pop (as sung by Eddie Rabbitt and Kenny Rogers, for example) into a black band's context."

== Track listing ==
Side one

1. "Painted Picture" (Harold Hudson, Walter Orange) – 4:55
2. "Lady (You Bring Me Up)" – 4:01
3. "Sail On" – 3:58
4. "Still" – 3:43
5. "Machine Gun" – 2:41

Side two

1. "Brick House" – 3:26
2. "Easy" – 4:15
3. "Oh No" – 3:00
4. "Three Times a Lady" – 3:35
5. "Reach High" (Commodores) – 3:35

== Production ==
- Commodores – producers, arrangements
- James Anthony Carmichael – producer, arrangements
- Jane Clark – recording, mixing (1, 10)
- Calvin Harris – recording, mixing (2–9)
- Phil Brown – assistant engineer
- Michael Johnson – assistant engineer
- Richard Wells – assistant engineer
- John Matousek – mastering
- Paulinho da Costa – percussion on "Painted Picture"
- Johnny Lee – art direction
- Ron Slenzak – photography
- Suzee Wendy Ikeda – project manager
