= I Forgot =

Single by Lionel Richie

from the album Renaissance
- Released: 11 June 2001 (UK)
- Length: 4:58
- Label: Island Def Jam
- Songwriters: Lionel Richie; Patrice Guirao; Pascal Obispo

Lionel Richie singles chronology
"Tender Heart" (2001)	"I Forgot" (2001)	"Cinderella" (2001)

"I Forgot" is a song by American singer Lionel Richie. An English language version of the French song "L'important c'est d'aimer" (1999), originally written and performed by Pascal Obispo, it was adapted by Richie and Patrice Guirao for Richie's sixth studio album Renaissance (2000) and appeared on several selected versions of the album. The song was released as the album's third single in Belgium and France, also serving as Renaissance's fourth single in United Kingdom. It peaked at number 18 in the Wallonian region of Belgium and reached the top forty of the UK Singles Chart.

== Track listings ==
CD maxi single
No.	Title	Writer(s)	Producer(s)	Length
1.	"I Forgot" (radio edit)	Lionel Richie; Patrice Guirao; Pascal Obispo	Richie	3:16
2.	"Still" (live)	Richie	James Anthony Carmichael; Wolfe^{[a]}	5:16
3.	"Don't Stop the Music" (extended album version)	Richie; Paul Barry; Mark Taylor	Taylor; Brian Rawling	6:12

Notes

- ^{^[a]} signifies a co-producer

== Credits and personnel ==
Credits adapted from the album's liner notes.

- Patrice Guirao – writer
- Pascal Obispo – writer
- Lionel Richie – vocals, writer

== Charts ==
Chart (2001)	Peak position
Belgium (Ultratop 50 Wallonia)	18
UK Singles (Official Charts)	34
