= All the Great Hits =

All the Great Hits can refer to:

- All the Great Hits (Diana Ross album)
- All the Great Hits (Jimmy Buffett album)
- All the Great Hits (Commodores album)
