= Mike & The Mechanics (1999 album) =

Mike & The Mechanics (M6)

Studio album by Mike + The Mechanics
- Released: 31 May 1999
- Recorded: 1998–99
- Studios: Fisher Lane Farm Studios (Surrey, UK); Dreamland Studios (London, UK)
- Genre: Pop rock
- Length: 54:11
- Label: Virgin
- Producers: Nick Davis; Christopher Neil; Brian Rawling; Mike Rutherford; Mark Taylor; Matthew Vaughan

Mike + The Mechanics chronology
Hits (1996)	Mike & The Mechanics (M6) (1999)	Rewired (2004)

Singles from Mike + The Mechanics
- 1. "Now That You've Gone" Released: 24 May 1999; 2. "Whenever I Stop" Released: 16 August 1999; 3. "All the Light I Need" Released: 1999

Professional ratings
Review scores
Source	Rating
Allmusic	3/5 stars
Q	4/5 stars

Mike & The Mechanics is the fifth studio album by Mike + The Mechanics, released in 1999. To avoid confusion with the band's 1985 debut album Mike + The Mechanics, it is often referred to as M6, which is written on the album cover, this being the band's sixth album counting the Hits compilation. It includes the top 40 hit "Now That You've Gone".

This was the last studio album with Paul Young, who died the year after its release; the group did not release another album until Rewired in 2004.

The album was not officially released in North America and is only available as an import there. However, the band's former US label Atlantic Records is still thanked in the liner notes.

== Track listing ==
No.	Title	Writer(s)	Producer(s)	Length
1.	"Whenever I Stop"	Paul Carrack, Mike Rutherford	Rutherford	3:38
2.	"Now That You've Gone"	Carrack, Rutherford	Brian Rawling, Mark Taylor	4:47
3.	"Ordinary Girl"	Carrack, Rutherford, Paul Young	Rutherford	3:50
4.	"All the Light I Need"	BA Robertson, Rutherford	Christopher Neil, Rutherford	4:36
5.	"What Will You Do"	Robertson, Rutherford	Nick Davis, Rutherford, Matthew Vaughan	3:15
6.	"My Little Island"	Robertson, Rutherford	Davis, Rutherford	4:05
7.	"Open Up"	Carrack, Rutherford	Davis, Rutherford, Vaughan	4:04
8.	"When I Get Over You"	Neil, Rutherford	Neil, Rutherford	4:10
9.	"If Only"	Carrack, Rutherford	Rutherford	4:42
10.	"Asking (for the Last Time)"	Carrack, Rutherford	Davis, Rutherford	4:16
11.	"Always Listen to Your Heart"	Carrack, Rutherford, Young	Davis, Rutherford, Vaughan	4:16
12.	"Did You See Me Coming"	Carrack, Rutherford	Davis, Rutherford	4:04
13.	"Look Across at Dreamland"	Robertson, Rutherford	Neil, Rutherford	4:14

== Personnel ==
Mike and The Mechanics

- Mike Rutherford – electric guitars, bass guitar, backing vocals
- Paul Carrack – lead vocals (1, 2, 4, 5, 7, 9, 10, 12), backing vocals, keyboards, electric guitars, drums
- Paul Young – lead vocals (3, 6, 8, 11, 13), backing vocals, percussion
- Gary Wallis – drums, programming

Additional personnel

- Oskar Paul – programming
- Steve Pigott – programming
- Matthew Vaughan – programming
- Simon Hale – string arrangements and conductor
- Sharon Woolf – backing vocals

Technical and design

- Nick Davis – engineer (1, 3, 5–7, 9–12), mixing (1, 3–13)
- Mark Taylor – engineer (2), mixing (2)
- Simon Hurrell – engineer (4, 8, 13)
- Ian Huffam – additional engineer (1, 3, 5–7, 9–12)
- Wherefore Art? – Cover design

== Charts ==
Chart (1999)	Peak position
German Albums (Offizielle Top 100)	9
Scottish Albums (Official Charts)	32
Swiss Albums (Schweizer Hitparade)	17
