= Back to Front (Lionel Richie album) =

1992 compilation album by Lionel Richie

Compilation album by Lionel Richie
- Released: May 5, 1992
- Recorded: 1976–1992
- Genres: Pop; R&B; dance-pop; soul
- Length: 68:28
- Label: Motown
- Producers: Lionel Richie; Stewart Levine; James Anthony Carmichael; Commodores

Lionel Richie chronology
Dancing on the Ceiling (1986)	Back to Front (1992)	Louder Than Words (1996)

Singles from Back to Front
- 1. "Do It to Me" Released: April 1992; 2. "My Destiny" Released: July 1992; 3. "Love, Oh Love" Released: November 1992 (Europe)

Professional ratings
Review scores
Source	Rating
AllMusic	3.5/5 stars
Chicago Tribune	3/5 stars

Back to Front is the first compilation album by American singer Lionel Richie, which was released on May 5, 1992, by Motown. It contains songs from both his successful solo career and as part of the band the Commodores, along with three new tracks (1–3). The international version of the album also includes the tracks "Dancing on the Ceiling" and "Stuck on You". It debuted atop both the UK Albums Chart and the ARIA Albums Chart, and spent 12 weeks at number one on the Dutch Album Top 100. The single "Do It to Me" reached number 21 on the U.S. Billboard Hot 100.

== Track listing ==
All songs are performed by Lionel Richie, unless stated otherwise. All songs are written by Lionel Richie, with additional writers noted.

North American version
No.	Title	Writer(s)	Original release	Length
1.	"Do It to Me"		Previously unreleased	6:04
2.	"My Destiny"		Previously unreleased	4:50
3.	"Love, Oh Love"	Brenda Harvey-Richie	Previously unreleased	5:48
4.	"All Night Long (All Night)" (single version)		Can't Slow Down, 1983	4:20
5.	"Easy" (The Commodores)		Commodores, 1977	4:18
6.	"Still" (The Commodores)		Midnight Magic, 1979	3:47
7.	"Endless Love" (Lionel Richie & Diana Ross)		Endless Love OST, 1981	4:28
8.	"Running with the Night" (single version)	Cynthia Weil	Can't Slow Down	4:10
9.	"Sail On" (The Commodores)		Midnight Magic	4:00
10.	"Hello"		Can't Slow Down	4:10
11.	"Truly"		Lionel Richie, 1982	3:22
12.	"Penny Lover" (single version)	Harvey-Richie	Can't Slow Down	3:47
13.	"Say You, Say Me"		Dancing on the Ceiling, 1986	4:03
14.	"Three Times a Lady" (The Commodores, single version)		Natural High, 1978	3:37
Total length:				60:44

International edition
No.	Title	Writer(s)	Original release	Length
9.	"Dancing on the Ceiling"	Carlos Rios; Michael Frenchik	Dancing on the Ceiling	4:21
10.	"Sail On" (The Commodores)		Midnight Magic	4:00
11.	"Hello"		Can't Slow Down	4:10
12.	"Truly"		Lionel Richie	3:22
13.	"Penny Lover"	Harvey-Richie	Can't Slow Down	3:47
14.	"Stuck on You"		Can't Slow Down	3:10
15.	"Say You, Say Me"		Dancing on the Ceiling	4:03
16.	"Three Times a Lady" (The Commodores)		Natural High	3:37
Total length:				68:28

== Personnel ==
Tracks 1, 2 & 3

- Lionel Richie – lead vocals, keyboards, rhythm arrangements, vocal arrangements, backing vocals (1, 2)
- Brad Cole – synthesizers, synthesizer programming
- Michael Landau – guitars (1, 2, 3)
- David Williams – guitars (2)
- Freddie Washington – bass
- Quincy Jones III – drum programming (1, 2)
- Jim Keltner – drums (3)
- Lenny Castro – percussion
- Marc Russo – saxophone solo (1)
- Stewart Levine – rhythm arrangements
- Paul Buckmaster – horn and string orchestrations (2, 3)
- Jim Gilstrap, Terry Holcomb, Marva King, Darlene Koldenhoven, Laura Lombardo, Benjamin McCrary, Quincy McCrary, Eve Reinhardt, Alice Sanderson, Richard Stuart, Carmen Twillie and Myla Twillie – backing vocals (3)

Track 7

- Lionel Richie – lead vocals, vocal arrangements
- Diana Ross – lead vocals
- Reginald "Sonny" Burke – Fender Rhodes
- Barnaby Finch – acoustic piano
- Paul Jackson Jr. – electric guitar, acoustic guitar solo
- Fred Tackett – guitar
- Nathan East – bass
- Rick Shlosser – drums
- Gene Page – horn, rhythm and string arrangements
- Harry Bluestone – concertmaster

=== Production ===
- Stewart Levine – producer (1, 2, 3)
- Lionel Richie – producer (1–4, 7, 8, 10–15)
- James Anthony Carmichael – producer (4, 5, 6, 8–16)
- Commodores – producers (5, 6, 9, 14, 16)
- Darren Klein – recording (1, 2, 3), mixing (1, 2, 3)
- Marnie Riley – assistant engineer (1, 2, 3)
- Reginald Dozier – engineer (7)
- Guy Costa – mixing (7)
- Bernie Grundman – mastering
- Johnny Lee – art direction, design
- Matthew Rolston – photography

Studios

- Tracks 1, 2 & 3 recorded and mixed at Conway Studios (Hollywood, California).
- Track 7 recorded at Devonshire Sound Studios (Hollywood, California). Mixed at Motown Recording Studios (West Hollywood, California).
- Mastered at Bernie Grundman Mastering (Hollywood, California).

== Charts ==
=== Weekly charts ===
Weekly chart performance for Back to Front
Chart (1992–93)	Peak position
Australian Albums (ARIA)	1
Austrian Albums (Ö3 Austria)	3
Belgian Albums (Ultratop Flanders)	38
Canada Top Albums/CDs (RPM)	13
Dutch Albums (Album Top 100)	1
German Albums (Offizielle Top 100)	2
Hungarian Albums (MAHASZ)	29
New Zealand Albums (RMNZ)	1
Norwegian Albums (VG-lista)	2
Swedish Albums (Sverigetopplistan)	22
Swiss Albums (Schweizer Hitparade)	3
UK Albums (Official Charts)	1
US Billboard 200	19
US Top R&B/Hip-Hop Albums (Billboard)	7

=== Year-end charts ===
1992 year-end chart performance for Back to Front
Chart (1992)	Position
Australian Albums (ARIA)	6
Austrian Albums (Ö3 Austria)	35
Canadian Albums (RPM)	69
Dutch Albums (Album Top 100)	2
European Albums (European Top 100 Albums)	7
German Albums (Offizielle Top 100)	16
New Zealand Albums (RMNZ)	6
Swiss Albums (Schweizer Hitparade)	14
US Billboard 200	100
US Top R&B/Hip-Hop Albums (Billboard)	40

1993 year-end chart performance for Back to Front
Chart (1993)	Position
Dutch Albums (Album Top 100)	16
European Albums (European Top 100 Albums)	98
UK Albums (OCC)	82

2001 year-end chart performance for Back to Front
Chart (2001)	Position
UK Albums (OCC)	196

== Certifications and sales ==
Certifications and sales for Back to Front
Region	Certification	Certified units/sales
Australia (ARIA)	2× Platinum	140,000^{^}
Austria (IFPI Austria)	Platinum	50,000^{*}
Canada (Music Canada)	Gold	50,000^{^}
France (SNEP)	3× Platinum	1,006,800
Germany (BVMI)	Platinum	500,000^{^}
Italy (FIMI) sales since 2009	Gold	25,000^{*}
Netherlands (NVPI)	Gold	50,000^{^}
New Zealand (RMNZ)	Platinum	15,000^{^}
Spain (Promusicae)	Gold	50,000^{^}
Switzerland (IFPI Switzerland)	2× Platinum	100,000
United Kingdom (BPI)	4× Platinum	1,793,978
United States (RIAA)	Platinum	1,000,000^{^}
Summaries
Worldwide	—	8,000,000
^{*} Sales figures based on certification alone.^{^} Shipments figures based on certification alone.
