= 20th Century Masters – The Millennium Collection: The Best of Lionel Richie =

Compilation album by Lionel Richie
- Released: October 7, 2003
- Genre: Contemporary R&B
- Length: 54:30
- Label: Motown
- Producer: Richie and Harry Weinger

Lionel Richie chronology
The Definitive Collection (2003)	20th Century Masters – The Millennium Collection: The Best of Lionel Richie (2003)	Just for You (2004)

20th Century Masters – The Millennium Collection: The Best of Lionel Richie is a compilation album by the American contemporary R&B singer Lionel Richie, released on October 7, 2003 by Motown, released as his volume in Universal Music's 20th Century Masters, a series of albums compiled with the intent of remastering old music for consumers of the 21st century to enjoy at an affordable price.

== Reception ==
Professional ratings
Review scores
Source	Rating
AllMusic	3.5/5 stars

Stephen Thomas Erlewine wrote in a review of the album that "There are a lot of songs that should have made the cut if this was going to be a truly representative, excellent 11-track recap of his solo career", noting that "this isn't bad for a budget-line compilation, since it's an enjoyable, concise sampler".

Popmatters reviewer Jon Langmead noted that "this disc just doesn’t do him justice", noting "What’s not really funny is that this disc really gives only a slight bit of insight towards answering that question; only five of the big hits are on this disc", concluding by saying that "This collection, because it’s missing so many worthwhile songs, seems especially unnecessary. He may be one of the few cases where it’s worth it to shell out a few more dollars for a more complete collection."

== Track listing ==
All tracks are written by Lionel Richie, except where noted.

Standard edition
No.	Title	Writer(s)	Original album	Length
1.	"You Are"	Richie and Brenda Harvey-Richie	Lionel Richie (1983)	5:01
2.	"Lionel Richie"		Lionel Richie	4:04
3.	"All Night Long (All Night)"		Can't Slow Down (1984)	6:22
4.	"Hello"		Can't Slow Down	4:09
5.	"Say You, Say Me"		Dancing on the Ceiling (1986)	4:01
6.	"Dancing on the Ceiling"	Richie, Carlos Rios and Michael Frenchik	Dancing on the Ceiling	4:32
7.	"Deep River Woman"		Dancing on the Ceiling	4:38
8.	"Cinderella"	Richie and Jon Wolfe	Renaissance (2001)	3:42
9.	"Zoom" (Originally by the Commodores)	Richie and Ronald LaPread	Commodores (1977)	7:05
10.	"Lady (You Bring Me Up)" (Originally by the Commodores)	Harold Hudson, Shirley King and William King	In the Pocket (1981)	4:50
11.	"Jesus is Love"		Heroes (1980)	6:06
Total length:				54:30

== Charts ==
Chart (2012)	Peak position
US Billboard 200	63
US Top Catalog Albums (Billboard)	5

== Certifications ==
Certifications for 20th Century Masters – The Millennium Collection: The Best of Lionel Richie
Region	Certification	Certified units/sales
United Kingdom (BPI)	Silver	60,000^{‡}
^{‡} Sales+streaming figures based on certification alone.
