= Painted Picture =

Single by Commodores

from the album All the Great Hits
- B-side: "Reach High (Instrumental)"
- Released: 1982
- Genre: R&B
- Label: Motown
- Songwriter(s): Harold Hudson, Walter Orange
- Producer(s): The Commodores, James Anthony Carmichael

Commodores singles chronology
"Lucy" (1982)	"Painted Picture" (1982)	"Reach High" (1983)

"Painted Picture" is a single by the Commodores released in 1982 by Motown Records. The song peaked at No. 19 on the Billboard Hot Soul Singles chart.

== Critical reception ==
RPM in their review of All the Great Hits, described "Painted Picture" as a "danceable, funkier than usual track".

Dave Marsh of Rolling Stone, in his review of the parent album, described "Painted Picture" as one of "the most funk-oriented (tracks) the Commodores have offered in awhile."

== Sampling ==
"Painted Picture" was sampled on "Dollars Make Sense" by Warren G featuring Kurupt and Crucial Conflict from the 1999 album I Want It All.

== Charts ==
Chart (1982)	Peak position
US Billboard Hot 100	70
US Hot Soul Singles (Billboard)	19
