= Relentless (Jo O'Meara album) =

Studio album by Jo O'Meara
- Released: 3 October 2005
- Recorded: 2004–2005
- Genre: Pop
- Length: 52:16
- Label: Sanctuary
- Producer: Fred Johansen; Cliff Masterson; Paul Meehan; Stefan Olsson; Bill Padley; Brian Rawling; Graham Stack; Jeff Taylor; Mark Taylor; Eg White

Jo O'Meara chronology
Relentless (2005)	With Love (2021)

Singles from Relentless'
- 1. "What Hurts the Most" Released: 26 September 2005

Relentless is the debut solo album by English singer Jo O'Meara. It was released by Sanctuary Records on 3 October 2005 in the United Kingdom, two and a half years after the initial split of her band S Club 7 in May 2003. Chiefly produced by Brian Rawling and co-written by O'Meara, the album is a mix of contemporary pop, disco and soulful ballads. It debuted and peaked at 48 on the UK Albums Chart.

== Critical reception ==
Professional ratings
Review scores
Source	Rating
The Guardian	2/5 stars

Caroline Sullivan from The Guardian found that "her solo album confirms beyond debate that [O'Meara] does indeed have a voice, and an Aguilera-type tornado at that, but it also proves that S Club's club-footed balladry still has a pernicious hold. The Celine Dion-ised slurpiness of the opening title track kickstarts a whole album's worth of future hen party classics. To hear her wasting her strong, sure vocals on sub-Kylie generica like "Let's Love" and the Nashville-via-Essex stab at country, "Never Felt Like This," is a pain. The joyous redemption of "Wish I Was Over You" is reminiscent of S Club's one claim to fabness, "Don't Stop Moving, and," similarly, just highlights the tepidness of the rest." BBC Music's James Blake called Relentless "slick, well constructed and safer than a bet on black still being in fashion this time next year [...] However that doesn't detract from this being a fairly decent debut; far better than certain other ex boy and girl band members."

== Track listing ==
No.	Title	Writer(s)	Producer(s)	Length
1.	"Relentless"	Paul Meehan; Steve Torch; Tim Woodcock	Brian Rawling; Meehan	3:52
2.	"What Hurts the Most"	Jeffrey Steele; Steve Robson	Rawling	3:29
3.	"Wish I Was Over You"	Jeff Taylor; Karen Poole; Mark Taylor	M. Taylor; J. Taylor; Rawling; Graham Stack	3:11
4.	"To Ease Your Pain"	Billy Steinberg; Jimmy Harry; Laila Samuelsen	Stack	3:52
5.	"You Didn't Know"	Andy Hayman; Fred Johansen; Jo O'Meara; Stefan Olssen	Johansen; Olsson; Meehan^{[a]}	4:46
6.	"Never Felt Like This"	Meehan; Woodcock	Meehan	3:41
7.	"Let's Love"	Hayman; Johansen; Olssen	Johansen; Olssen; Meehan^{[a]}	3:51
8.	"Baby I'm a Fool"	Bill Padley; Eg White	Padley; White; Meehan^{[a]}	3:27
9.	"I Believe in You"	Hayman; Cliff Masterson; O'Meara	Masterson	3:41
10.	"Never Meant to Break Your Heart"	O'Meara; Meehan; Woodcock	Meehan	3:52
11.	"It's Your Love"	Stephony Smith	Rawling; Meehan	3:43
12.	"It Felt Like Love"	Ben Adams; Mark Read	Meehan	3:37
13.	"That's Where I'll Belong"	Katherine Ellis; Meehan; Woodcock	Meehan	3:29
14.	"Rainbow's End"	Masterson; O'Meara	Meehan	3:45
Total length:				52:16

Notes

- ^{^[a]} signifies an additional producer.

== Charts ==
Chart (2005)	Peak position
Scottish Albums (OCC)	56
UK Albums (OCC)	48
UK Independent Albums (OCC)	16
