= European Hit Radio (chart) =

European music chart

The European Hit Radio chart (also known as European Airplay Top 50 or European Radio Top 50) was a weekly chart compiled and published by pan-European magazine Music & Media.

== Number one singles on the European Hit Radio chart ==
Key
†	Best-performing airplay song of the year

Song	Artist(s)	Issue date	Wks.
1990
"Another Day in Paradise"	Phil Collins	18 November 1989	12
"Dear Jessie"	Madonna	27 January 1990	1
"Nothing Compares 2 U"	Sinéad O'Connor	24 February 1990	7
"Enjoy the Silence"	Depeche Mode	7 April 1990	2
"Black Velvet"	Alannah Myles	28 April 1990	2
"Vogue"	Madonna	12 May 1990	7
"Se bastasse una canzone"	Eros Ramazzotti	30 June 1990	1
"Hold On"	Wilson Phillips	7 July 1990	2
"It Must Have Been Love"	Roxette	21 July 1990	3
"Hanky Panky"	Madonna	11 August 1990	4
"Club at the End of the Street"	Elton John	8 September 1990	1
"Praying for Time"	George Michael	15 September 1990	3
"Tom's Diner"	DNA featuring Suzanne Vega	6 October 1990	2
"I've Been Thinking About You"	Londonbeat	20 October 1990	4 (Note: "I've Been Thinking About You" returned to number one on 19 January 1991.)
"I'm Your Baby Tonight"	Whitney Houston	10 November 1990	6 (Note: "I'm Your Baby Tonight" returned to number one on 26 January 1991.)
"I'll Be Your Baby Tonight"	Robert Palmer featuring UB40	15 December 1990	4 (Note: No chart issued on 29 December 1990.)
1991
"All This Time"	Sting	2 February 1991	8
"Joyride"	Roxette	30 March 1991	6
"Secret Love"	Bee Gees	13 April 1991	1
"The One and Only"	Chesney Hawkes	18 May 1991	1
"Love Is a Wonderful Thing"	Michael Bolton	25 May 1991	3
"Fading Like a Flower (Every Time You Leave)"	Roxette	15 June 1991	1
"The Shoop Shoop Song (It's in His Kiss)"	Cher	22 June 1991	5
"Rush Rush"	Paula Abdul	20 July 1991	1
"(Everything I Do) I Do It for You" †	Bryan Adams	3 August 1991	10 (Note: "(Everything I Do) I Do It for You" stayed at number one until 12 October 1991. Music & Media had since stopped published European Airplay Top 50.)
"Calling Elvis"	Dire Straits	21 September 1991	1
1990
"I'm Your Baby Tonight"	Whitney Houston	22 December 1990	1
1991
"Freedom! '90"	George Michael	12 January 1991	3
"All This Time"	Sting	2 February 1991	4
"Cry for Help"	Rick Astley	2 March 1991	2
"Auberge"	Chris Rea	16 March 1991	1
"My Side of the Bed"	Susanna Hoffs	23 March 1991	1
"Joyride"	Roxette	30 March 1991	2 (Note: "Joyride" returned to number one on 11 May 1991.)
"Rhythm of My Heart"	Rod Stewart	6 April 1991	8
"Love Is a Wonderful Thing"	Michael Bolton	8 June 1991	3
"Fading Like a Flower (Every Time You Leave)"	Roxette	29 June 1991	2
"Rush Rush"	Paula Abdul	20 July 1991	4
"(Everything I Do) I Do It for You" †	Bryan Adams	10 August 1991	11
"Something Got Me Started"	Simply Red	2 November 1991	4
"Change"	Lisa Stansfield	30 November 1991	1
"No Son of Mine"	Genesis	7 December 1991	1
"Black or White"	Michael Jackson	14 December 1991	8
1992
"I Can't Dance"	Genesis	22 February 1992	2
"Remember the Time"	Michael Jackson	7 March 1992	4
"Human Touch"	Bruce Springsteen	4 April 1992	4
"Why"	Annie Lennox	2 May 1992	4
"Do It to Me"	Lionel Richie	30 May 1992	4
"The One"	Elton John	27 June 1992	4
"Too Funky" †	George Michael	25 July 1992	2
"This Used to Be My Playground"	Madonna	8 August 1992	8
"My Destiny"	Lionel Richie	3 October 1992	2
"Iron Lion Zion"	Bob Marley and the Wailers	17 October 1992	2
"Erotica"	Madonna	31 October 1992	4
"Sleeping Satellite"	Tasmin Archer	28 November 1992	2
"I Will Always Love You"	Whitney Houston	12 December 1992	9
1993
"If I Ever Lose My Faith in You"	Sting	27 February 1993	3
"Ordinary World"	Duran Duran	20 March 1993	1
"I'm Every Woman"	Whitney Houston	27 March 1993	4
"Give In to Me"	Michael Jackson	24 April 1993	1
"Jump They Say"	David Bowie	1 May 1993	1
"Informer"	Snow	8 May 1993	1
"Somebody to Love"	George Michael and Queen	15 May 1993	1
"That's the Way Love Goes"	Janet Jackson	22 May 1993	5
"I Don't Wanna Fight"	Tina Turner	26 June 1993	2
"(I Can't Help) Falling in Love with You"	UB40	10 July 1993	6
"What's Up?" †	4 Non Blondes	21 August 1993	5
"Dreamlover"	Mariah Carey	25 September 1993	4
"Go West"	Pet Shop Boys	23 October 1993	2
"Both Sides of the Story"	Phil Collins	6 November 1993	5
"Please Forgive Me"	Bryan Adams	11 December 1993	5
1994
"All for Love"	Bryan Adams, Rod Stewart, and Sting	29 January 1994	7
"Streets of Philadelphia"	Bruce Springsteen	19 March 1994	6
"The Most Beautiful Girl in the World"	Symbol	30 April 1994	7
"I'll Stand by You"	The Pretenders	18 June 1994	2
"Love Is All Around"	Wet Wet Wet	2 July 1994	9
"7 Seconds"	Youssou N'Dour and Neneh Cherry	3 September 1994	7
"Always"	Bon Jovi	22 October 1994	8 (Note: "Always" returned to number one on 26 November 1994, remaining there until 7 January 1995.)
"Secret"	Madonna	5 November 1994	3
1995
"Stay Another Day"	East 17	14 January 1995	3
"She's a River"	Simple Minds	4 February 1995	3
"No More 'I Love You's"	Annie Lennox	25 February 1995	7
"Back for Good"	Take That	15 April 1995	5
"Have You Ever Really Loved a Woman?"	Bryan Adams	20 May 1995	4
"Scream"	Michael Jackson and Janet Jackson	17 June 1995	5
"This Ain't a Love Song"	Bon Jovi	22 July 1995	2
"Hold Me, Thrill Me, Kiss Me, Kill Me"	U2	5 August 1995	2
"Shy Guy"	Diana King	19 August 1995	5
"You Are Not Alone"	Michael Jackson	23 September 1995	4
"Fantasy"	Mariah Carey	21 October 1995	3
"Fairground"	Simply Red	11 November 1995	1
"Heaven for Everyone"	Queen	18 November 1995	3
"Exhale (Shoop Shoop)"	Whitney Houston	9 December 1995	1
"GoldenEye"	Tina Turner	16 December 1995	2
1996
"Earth Song"	Michael Jackson	6 January 1996	4
"Jesus to a Child"	George Michael	3 February 1996	5
"Let Your Soul Be Your Pilot"	Sting	9 March 1996	3
"How Deep Is Your Love"	Take That	30 March 1996	4
"They Don't Care About Us"	Michael Jackson	27 April 1996	2
"Fastlove"	George Michael	11 May 1996	6
"The Only Thing That Looks Good on Me Is You"	Bryan Adams	22 June 1996	4
"Killing Me Softly"	Fugees	20 July 1996	5
"Woman"	Neneh Cherry	24 August 1996	3
"Se a vida é (That's the Way Life Is)"	Pet Shop Boys	14 September 1996	2
"Wannabe"	Spice Girls	28 September 1996	2
"Dance into the Light"	Phil Collins	12 October 1996	2
"I Love You Always Forever"	Donna Lewis	26 October 1996	3
"Say You'll Be There"	Spice Girls	16 November 1996	6
1997
"Step by Step"	Whitney Houston	18 January 1997	1
1997
"Step by Step"	Whitney Houston	25 January 1997	2
"Don't Speak"	No Doubt	8 February 1997	5
"Your Woman"	White Town	15 March 1997	4
"The Real Thing"	Lisa Stansfield	12 April 1997	4
"Blood on the Dance Floor"	Michael Jackson	10 May 1997	5
"MMMBop"	Hanson	14 June 1997	7
"I'll Be Missing You"	Puff Daddy and Faith Evans featuring 112	2 August 1997	6
"Men in Black"	Will Smith	13 September 1997	5
"Anybody Seen My Baby?"	The Rolling Stones	18 October 1997	3
"Spice Up Your Life"	Spice Girls	8 November 1997	3
"As Long as You Love Me"	Backstreet Boys	29 November 1997	2 (Note: "As Long as You Love Me" returned to number one on 13 December 1997)
"Sunchyme"	Dario G	6 December 1997	1
"Back to You"	Bryan Adams	20 December 1997	1
"Together Again"	Janet Jackson	27 December 1997	7 (Note: "Together Again" returned to number one on 24 January, 31 January, 7 February, and 21 February)
1998
"Torn"	Natalie Imbruglia	17 January 1998	3 (Note: "Torn" returned to number one on 14 February and 28 February)
"Frozen"	Madonna	7 March 1998	9
"Stop"	Spice Girls	9 May 1998	1
"Truly Madly Deeply"	Savage Garden	16 May 1998	1
"Say You Love Me"	Simply Red	23 May 1998	3
"Ray of Light"	Madonna	13 June 1998	4
"Life"	Des'ree	11 July 1998	7
"Viva Forever"	Spice Girls	29 August 1998	4
"Millennium"	Robbie Williams	26 September 1998	5
"Outside"	George Michael	31 October 1998	5
"Believe"	Cher	5 December 1998	7
1999
"Big Big World"	Emilia Rydberg	23 January 1999	4
"Wish I Could Fly"	Roxette	20 February 1999	2
"...Baby One More Time"	Britney Spears	6 March 1999	9
"No Scrubs"	TLC	8 May 1999	1
"In Our Lifetime"	Texas	15 May 1999	1
"I Want It That Way"	Backstreet Boys	22 May 1999	4
"Canned Heat"	Jamiroquai	19 June 1999	1
"Beautiful Stranger"	Madonna	26 June 1999	8
"If You Had My Love"	Jennifer Lopez	21 August 1999	1
"Summer Son"	Texas	28 August 1999	4
"Genie in a Bottle"	Christina Aguilera	25 September 1999	3 (Note: "Genie on a Bottle returned to number one on 16 October and 23 October 1999)
"Unpretty"	TLC	2 October 1999	2
"I Saved the World Today"	Eurythmics	30 October 1999	4
"Waiting for Tonight"	Jennifer Lopez	27 November 1999	8

== See also ==
- Music & Media on World Radio History
