= My Destiny (Lionel Richie song) =

1992 single by Lionel Richie

Single by Lionel Richie

from the album Back to Front
- B-side: "Do It to Me"
- Released: July 28 1992
- Genre: Pop; R&B
- Length: 4:50 (album version); 3:40 (single edit/video version)
- Label: Motown
- Songwriter: Lionel Richie
- Producers: Lionel Richie; Stewart Levine

Lionel Richie singles chronology
"Do It to Me" (1992)	"My Destiny" (1992)	"Love, Oh Love" (1992)

Music video
- "My Destiny" on YouTube

"My Destiny" is a song recorded by American singer and songwriter Lionel Richie. It was released on July 28 1992 by Motown Records as the second single from his first compilation album, Back to Front (1992). It was written by Richie and produced by himself and Stewart Levine. The song topped the Dutch Single Top 100 and was a top-10 hit in Ireland, the UK and Belgium, It also appeared on Richie's best of albums Truly: The Love Songs and The Definitive Collection.

== Critical reception ==
Bryan Buss from AllMusic described the song as "classic, smooth Richie". J.D. Considine noted its "low-key vocals and understated, fatback groove". Larry Flick from Billboard magazine wrote, "Lively pop/R&B instrumentation, a la Simply Red, triggers his most relaxed and spirited vocal in years. Familiarity of chorus will assist in winning friends at urban, top 40, and AC levels. Far more satisfying than the previous 'Do It to Me'." Fell and Rufer from the Gavin Report commented, "A love song with a brilliant beat, this fresh Richie track from his retrospective album, Back to Front, is sure to be a crowdpleaser."

== Music video ==
In the accompanying music video for "My Destiny", directed by Mary Lambert, Richie sings in front of four dancing supermodels with his shirt unbuttoned.

== Track listings ==
- 7-inch single
1. "My Destiny" (Lite mix edit) – 3:50
2. "Do It to Me" (Rhythm Method single edit) – 4:35
- 12-inch maxi
1. "My Destiny" (Hiphouse 2 mix) – 5:55
2. "Do It to Me" (Rhythm Method single edit) – 4:35
3. "Do It to Me" (Rhythm Method extended mix) – 6:32
4. "My Destiny" (Lite mix edit) – 3:50
- CD maxi
1. "My Destiny" (Lite mix edit) – 3:49
2. "Do It to Me" (Rhythm Method single edit) – 4:36
3. "My Destiny" (Hiphouse 2 mix) – 5:59
4. "Do It to Me" (Rhythm Method extended mix) – 6:32
- Cassette
1. "My Destiny" (Lite mix edit)
2. "Do It to Me" (Rhythm Method single edit)

== Charts ==
=== Weekly charts ===
Chart (1992)	Peak position
Australia (ARIA)	125
Austria (Ö3 Austria Top 40)	22
Belgium (Ultratop 50 Flanders)	6
Europe (European AC Radio)	1
Europe (European Dance Radio)	12
Europe (European Hit Radio)	1
France (SNEP)	18
Germany (GfK)	23
Ireland (IRMA)	10
Netherlands (Dutch Top 40)	2
Netherlands (Single Top 100)	1
New Zealand (Recorded Music NZ)	38
Switzerland (Schweizer Hitparade)	19
UK Singles (OCC)	7
UK Airplay (Music Week)	1
UK Dance (Music Week)	29
US Adult Contemporary (Billboard)	7
US Hot R&B/Hip-Hop Songs (Billboard)	56

=== Year-end charts ===
Chart (1992)	Position
Belgium (Ultratop Flanders)	33
Europe (European Hit Radio)	7
Netherlands (Dutch Top 40)	21
Netherlands (Single Top 100)	22
UK Singles (OCC)	32
UK Airplay (Music Week)	11
US Adult Contemporary (Billboard)	50

== Certifications ==
Region	Certification	Certified units/sales
United Kingdom (BPI)	Silver	200,000^{‡}
^{‡} Sales+streaming figures based on certification alone.
