= To Love a Woman =

"To Love A Woman"

Single by Lionel Richie featuring Enrique Iglesias

from the album Encore and Escape
- Released: April 7, 2003
- Length: 3:55
- Label: Island
- Songwriter(s): Paul Barry; Enrique Iglesias; Lionel Richie
- Producer(s): Mark Taylor; Richie Jones (co.); Ric Wake (co.)

Lionel Richie singles chronology
"The One" (2001)	"To Love a Woman" (2003)	"Just for You" (2004)

Music video
- "To Love a Woman" on YouTube

"To Love a Woman" is a song by American singer Lionel Richie, featuring vocals from Spanish singer Enrique Iglesias. It was written by Richie, Iglesias and Paul Barry for Richie's live album Encore (2002), while production was helmed by Mark Taylor along with co-producers Ric Wake and Richie Jones. The song was released as the album's first and only single in Europe where it became a top ten hit in Belgium and entered the top 20 in Switzerland and United Kingdom. "To Love a Woman" was later also included on the 2002 re-issue of Iglesias' fifth studio album, Escape (2001).

== Track listings ==
CD maxi single
No.	Title	Writer(s)	Producer(s)	Length
1.	"To Love a Woman" (Radio Edit)	Paul Barry; Enrique Iglesias; Lionel Richie	Mark Taylor; Richie Jones^{[a]}; Ric Wake^{[a]}	3:53
2.	"Just to Be Close to You" (Live)	Richie		3:53
3.	"Cinderella" (Live)	Richie; Joe Wolfe		4:03
4.	"To Love a Woman" (Video)			3:53

Notes

- ^{^[a]} signifies a co-producer

== Charts ==
=== Weekly charts ===
Weekly chart performance for "To Love a Woman"
Chart (2003)	Peak position
Austria (Ö3 Austria Top 40)	50
Belgium (Ultratip Bubbling Under Flanders)	2
Belgium (Ultratip Bubbling Under Wallonia)	8
Canada (Nielsen SoundScan)	32
Germany (GfK)	52
Switzerland (Schweizer Hitparade)	14
Romania (Romanian Top 100)	5
UK Singles (OCC)	19

=== Year-end charts ===
2003 year-end chart performance for "To Love a Woman"
Chart (2003)	Position
Romania (Romanian Top 100)	63
