= Cinderella (Lionel Richie song) =

2001 song performed by Lionel Richie

Single by Lionel Richie

from the album Renaissance
- Released: 21 May 2001
- Genre: Latin pop
- Length: 3:42
- Label: Island Def Jam
- Songwriters: Lionel Richie; Joe Wolfe
- Producers: Lionel Richie; Joe Wolfe

Lionel Richie singles chronology
"I Forgot" (2001)	"Cinderella" (2001)	"The One" (2001)

"Cinderella" is a song by American singer Lionel Richie. It was written and produced by Richie along with Joe Wolfe for his sixth studio album Renaissance (2000). The latin pop song was released as the album's third single in Continental Europe in the second quartet of 2001. A minor commercial success, it peaked within the top fifty of the Swiss Singles Chart, while also reaching the charts in Germany and the Netherlands.

== Track listings ==
CD maxi single
No.	Title	Writer(s)	Producer(s)	Length
1.	"Cinderella"	Lionel Richie; Joe Wolfe	Richie; Wolfe	3:42
2.	"Just Can't Say Goodbye"	Richie; Paul Barry; Mark Taylor	Taylor; Brian Rawling	4:08
3.	"Still" (Live)	Richie	James Anthony Carmichael; Wolfe^{[a]}	5:16
4.	"Don't Stop the Music" (Extended Album Version)	Richie; Taylor; Barry	Taylor; Rawling	6:12

Notes

- ^{^[a]} signifies a co-producer

== Credits and personnel ==
Credits adapted from the album's liner notes.

- Alex Al – bass
- Gary Bias – horns
- Raymond Brown – horns, horns arrangement
- Gerald Cox – background vocals
- Jared Douglas – background vocals
- James Hoover – engineering assistant
- Paul Jackson Jr. – guitar
- Lionel Richie – producer, vocals, writer
- Michael Stewart – horns
- Dirk Vanoucek – recording
- Kelly Wendall – horns
- Joe Wolfe – keyboards, producer, programming, writer
- Reginald Young – horns
- Wassim Zriek – engineering assistant

== Charts ==
Chart (2001)	Peak position
Germany (GfK)	74
Netherlands (Single Top 100)	82
Poland (Polish Airplay Chart)	16
Switzerland (Schweizer Hitparade)	49
