= Angel (Lionel Richie song) =

2000 song by Lionel Richie

Single by Lionel Richie

from the album Renaissance
- Released: October 2000
- Recorded: 1999–2000
- Genre: Dance-pop, house
- Length: 4:16
- Label: Island Def Jam
- Songwriters: Lionel Richie; Paul Barry; Mark Taylor
- Producers: Brian Rawling; Mark Taylor

Lionel Richie singles chronology
"Closest Thing to Heaven" (1998)	"Angel" (2000)	"Don't Stop the Music" (2000)

Music video
- "Angel" (Metro Mix) on YouTube

"Angel" is a song by American singer Lionel Richie. It was written by Richie, Paul Barry, and Mark Taylor for his sixth studio album Renaissance (2000), while production was helmed by Brian Rawling and Taylor. Island Def Jam released "Angel" as the album's lead single in October 2000. Richie's highest-charting success in years, it reached the top ten in Austria, Germany, the Netherlands, and on the US Billboard Adult Contemporary chart, while peaking at number 18 on the UK Singles Chart.

== Music video ==
An accompanying music video for "Angel" was filmed by German directors Wolf Gresenz und Bernard Wedig and took ten days to be completed. Budgeted at 650.000 D-Mark, it marked production company Blow Film's first video with international clients. Shot in Berlin, including locations such as the Babelsberg Studios in Potsdam-Babelsberg and the Berlin Alexanderplatz station, it went into post production after its third day of filming.

== Credits and personnel ==
Credits adapted from the liner notes of Renaissance.

- Production – Brian Rawling, Mark Taylor
- Assistant engineers – Jong Uk Yoon, Chris Anderson
- Additional guitars – Paul Jackson Jr.
- Additional recording – Dirk Vanoucek
- Keyboards, programming – Mark Taylor
- Background vocals – Tracy Ackerman
- Executive producer – Skip Miller

== Track listing ==
CD Maxi Single

1. "Angel" (Metro Mix) - 3:45
2. "Angel" (Boogieman Remix Radio Edit) - 3:59
3. "Angel" (Boogieman Remix Extended) - 6:45
4. "Angel" (Crash & Burn Remix Dub) - 5:47
5. "Angel" (Crash & Burn Remix Vocal) - 6:02
6. "Angel" (Boogieman Remix Dub) - 6:21

Australia CD Single

1. "Angel" (Chuckii B Mix) - 3:56
2. "Angel" (Metro Mix) - 3:45
3. "Angel" (Crash & Burn Remix Dub) - 5:47
4. "Angel" (Crash & Burn Remix Vocal) - 6:02

UK CD Single 1

1. "Angel" (Metro Mix) - 3:45
2. "Angel" (Boogieman Remix Extended) - 6:45
3. "Angel" (Crash & Burn Remix Vocal) - 6:02

UK CD Single 2

1. "Angel" (Metro Mix) - 3:45
2. "Shout It To The World" - 3:59
3. "All Night Long" (Live) - 5:51

UK Cassette Single

1. "Angel" (Metro Mix) - 3:45
2. "All Night Long" (Live) - 5:51

== Charts ==
=== Weekly charts ===
Chart (2000–01)	Peak position
Australia (ARIA)	123
Austria (Ö3 Austria Top 40)	6
France (SNEP)	49
Germany (GfK)	9
Hungary (MAHASZ)	3
Italy (FIMI)	34
Netherlands (Dutch Top 40)	8
Netherlands (Single Top 100)	6
New Zealand (Recorded Music NZ)	31
Poland (Polish Airplay Charts)	5
Portugal (AFP)	5
Sweden (Sverigetopplistan)	42
Switzerland (Schweizer Hitparade)	27
UK Singles (OCC)	18
US Billboard Hot 100	70
US Adult Contemporary (Billboard)	4
US Dance Club Songs (Billboard)	32

=== Year-end charts ===
Year-end chart performance for "Angel" by Lionel Richie
Chart (2000)	Position
Germany (Media Control)	86

Chart (2001)	Position
Canada Radio (Nielsen BDS)	41
Netherlands (Dutch Top 40)	84
Netherlands (Single Top 100)	58
US Adult Contemporary (Billboard)	14

== Certifications ==
Region	Certification	Certified units/sales
Netherlands (NVPI)	Gold	40,000^{^}
^{^} Shipments figures based on certification alone.
