= Midnight Magic (album) =

Studio album by Commodores
- Released: July 27, 1979
- Recorded: 1979
- Studios: Motown (Los Angeles, California)
- Genres: Disco; R&B; funk
- Length: 38:57
- Label: Motown
- Producers: James Anthony Carmichael; Commodores

Commodores chronology
| Greatest Hits (1978) | Midnight Magic (1979) | Heroes (1980) |

Singles from Midnight Magic
- 1. "Sail On" Released: July 27, 1979; 2. "Still" Released: September 14, 1979; 3. "Wonderland" Released: December 14, 1979

Midnight Magic is the seventh studio album by the musical group the Commodores, released in 1979. It was certified Gold in the UK by the BPI. Midnight Magic was nominated for a Grammy Award in the category of Best R&B Performance by a Duo, Group or Chorus.

== Critical reception ==
Professional ratings
Review scores
| Source | Rating |
|---|---|
| AllMusic | 2.5/5 stars |
| MusicHound Rock: The Essential Album Guide | 3/5 stars |
| Music Week | 4/4 stars |
| Smash Hits | 5/10 |
| The Virgin Encyclopedia of R&B and Soul | 3/5 stars |

The New York Times stated that "the Commodores, too, have their disco‐dance numbers. But this group's principal appeal would seem to be its ability to come up with classy 'makeout' music. The new Midnight Magic, which is moving up the album charts quickly, will disappoint no one in search of just that. And as usual, the Commodores' ability to span a wide stylistic range and to avoid some of the more tired cliches of black vocal instrumental groups is extremely refreshing." Smash Hits called it, "solid professional funk, but still faceless and only moderately entertaining - mainly because of a distinct threadbareness in the melody department." The Bay State Banner noted that "the vocals, it is true, are rather toneless—grouped together in the mix, the textural interest of a single throat is erased—but the rhythm section plays with verve through unusual chordings that oddly parallel the vocal register."

== Singles ==
"Still" became the band's second U.S. No. 1 single. Another single was the No. 4 hit "Sail On".

Record World said of the single "Wonderland" that "the vocals will mesmerize all tastes." "Wonderland" reached No. 25.

== Track listing ==
| No. | Title | Writer(s) | Length |
|---|---|---|---|
| 1. | "Gettin' It" | David Cochrane, Walter Orange | 4:18 |
| 2. | "Midnight Magic" | Lionel Richie, Jr., Thomas McClary | 5:42 |
| 3. | "You're Special" | Harold Hudson, William King | 5:10 |
| 4. | "Still" | Lionel Richie, Jr | 5:51 |
| 5. | "Wonderland" | Milan Williams | 5:28 |
| 6. | "Sexy Lady" | Thomas McClary | 3:30 |
| 7. | "Lovin' You" | Ronald LaPread | 4:36 |
| 8. | "Sail On" | Lionel Richie, Jr. | 5:43 |
| 9. | "12:01 A.M. (Reprise)" | Lionel Richie, Jr., Thomas McClary | 0:59 |
| Total length: | | | 41:17 |

== Personnel ==
Commodores

- Lionel Richie – vocals, acoustic piano, keyboards, saxophones
- Milan Williams – keyboards
- Thomas McClary – vocals, lead guitar
- Ronald LaPread – vocals, bass
- Walter Orange – vocals, drums, percussion
- William King – vocals, trumpet, keyboards, percussion

Additional personnel

- Harold Hudson – horn and string arrangements (1, 3, 6)
- James Anthony Carmichael – horn and string arrangements (2, 4, 5, 7–9)

The Mean Machine

- David Cochrane – saxophones
- Harold Hudson – trumpet
- Darrell Jones – rhythm guitar
- Winston Sims – saxophones

Production

- Commodores – producers, arrangements
- James Anthony Carmichael – producer, arrangements
- Calvin Harris – engineer, mixing
- Jane Clark – engineer, mixing
- Bernie Grundman – mastering at A&M Studios (Hollywood, California)
- John Cabalka – art direction
- Ginny Livingston – design
- Tom Nikosey – cover and logo design
- Gene Gurley – photography
- Suzee Ikeda – product manager

== Charts ==
=== Weekly charts ===
| Chart (1979–1980) | Peak position |
|---|---|
| U.S. Billboard 200 | 3 |
| U.S. Billboard R&B Albums | 1 |
| Australia | 56 |
| C.A. RPM Pop Albums | 17 |
| New Zealand | 7 |
| Netherlands | 9 |
| Sweden | 44 |
| UK Albums Chart (OCC) | 15 |
| Norway | 20 |

=== Year-end charts ===
| Chart (1979) | Peak position |
|---|---|
| Billboard R&B | 36 |

| Chart (1980) | Peak position |
|---|---|
| U.S. Billboard 200 | 22 |
| Billboard R&B | 10 |

=== Singles ===
| Single | Chart | Position |
|---|---|---|
| "Sail On" | Belgium (VRT Top 30) | 14 |
| "Sail On" | Canada (RPM) | 3 |
| "Sail On" | Ireland Singles Chart | 8 |
| "Sail On" | Netherlands Singles Top 100 | 8 |
| "Sail On" | Official New Zealand Music Chart | 6 |
| "Sail On" | UK Singles Chart | 8 |
| "Sail On" | U.S.Billboard Hot 100 | 4 |
| "Sail On" | U.S. Billboard Adult Contemporary | 9 |
| "Sail On" | U.S. Billboard Hot R&B Singles | 8 |
| "Still" | Canada (RPM) | 2 |
| "Still" | Ireland Singles Chart | 3 |
| "Still" | Netherlands Singles Top 100 | 16 |
| "Still" | Official New Zealand Music Chart | 13 |
| "Still" | UK Singles Chart | 4 |
| "Still" | U.S.Billboard Hot 100 | 1 |
| "Still" | U.S. Billboard Adult Contemporary | 6 |
| "Still" | U.S. Billboard Hot R&B Singles | 1 |
| "Wonderland" | Canada (RPM) | 70 |
| "Wonderland" | UK Singles Chart | 40 |
| "Wonderland" | U.S.Billboard Hot 100 | 25 |
| "Wonderland" | U.S. Billboard Adult Contemporary | 43 |
| "Wonderland" | U.S. Billboard Hot R&B Singles | 21 |

== Sales and certifications ==
Certifications for Midnight Magic
| Region | Certification | Certified units/sales |
|---|---|---|
| Netherlands (NVPI) | Gold | 50,000^{^} |
| United Kingdom (BPI) | Gold | 100,000^{^} |
^{^} Shipments figures based on certification alone.
