= Skip Miller =

Alvin "Skip" Miller
- Born: 1946
- Origin: New York, New York, U.S.
- Died: September 4, 2009 (aged 62–63)
- Genres: Rock, soul, pop, rap, jazz
- Occupation: Record executive
- Years active: 1971–2009
- Labels: Motown, RCA

Alvin "Skip" Miller (1946 - September 4, 2009) was an American recording industry executive. He worked for 17 years at Motown Records (1971–1988) and served as the label's last president before the company was sold to MCA. While at Motown, he was credited with developing Rick James, DeBarge and the Commodores. After the sale of Motown, Miller worked for a decade at RCA Records, where he was credited with rejuvenating the label's black music division and helping to develop the rap genre. He later worked as the manager of Lionel Richie's solo career.

== Personal life ==
Born in New York City, Miller was the son of a fireman. He graduated from Hofstra University with a degree in chemistry. Miller joined the U.S. Army in 1968 and served in the Vietnam War.

In September 2009, Miller died of a heart attack while being treated for an intestinal infection at Cedars Sinai Hospital in Los Angeles. After Miller's death, Smokey Robinson called Miller "an integral part of . . . our Motown family. He was my brother, and I loved him very much. What a loss."

== Career ==
=== Motown ===
Miller began his career in the recording industry as a stock clerk for Motown in 1971. He was promoted through the ranks at Motown to positions in sales, marketing and artist relations. He received the Recording Industry Association of America's Music Executive of the Year award in 1980 and became the president of Motown Records in 1987. He remained president of Motown until the company was sold to MCA in 1988. In his 17 years at Motown, Miller has been credited with being a key to the success of numerous artists, including Rick James, DeBarge and the Commodores. He also worked with Stevie Wonder, Smokey Robinson and Diana Ross.

=== RCA Records ===
After the sale of Motown, Miller worked for a decade at RCA Records. He was the senior vice president of black, jazz and progressive music at RCA, where he was credited with rejuvenating the label’s black music division. He discovered and developed SWV, Me Phi Me and Stacy Earl. He also helped develop to the rap genre, working with DJ Jazzy Jeff and the Fresh Prince (Will Smith), Kool Moe Dee, Too Short and KRS-One.

=== Lion Tracks and Panda Entertainment Group ===
In 1998, Miller he took over Lion Tracks, where he was the manager of Lionel Richie's solo career. In 2004, he established Panda Entertainment Group, a talent management company where he worked with Richie, R. Kelly, Lina, Nathan Stone and Megan Peeler.
