= Time (Lionel Richie album) =

1998 album by Lionel Richie

Studio album by Lionel Richie
- Released: June 23, 1998
- Studio: The Castle (Franklin, Tennessee); Conway Studios and Ocean Way Recording (Hollywood, California); Chartmaker Studios (Malibu, California); Barking Doctor Recording (Mount Kisco, New York)
- Genre: Pop rock; R&B
- Length: 55:35
- Label: Mercury
- Producer: James Anthony Carmichael; Lionel Richie; David Foster

Lionel Richie chronology
Truly: The Love Songs (1997)	Time (1998)	Renaissance (2000)

Singles from Time
- 1. "Time" Released: 1998; 2. "I Hear Your Voice" Released: 1998; 3. "Closest Thing to Heaven" Released: 1998

Time is the fifth studio album by Lionel Richie, released on June 23, 1998. It was a commercial disappointment, selling far fewer copies than any of his previous material.

== Critical reception ==
Professional ratings
Review scores
Source	Rating
AllMusic	3/5 stars
Los Angeles Times	2/4 stars

Allmusic editor Stephen Thomas Erlewine found that Time "doesn't quite match the heights of Lionel Richie or Can't Slow Down, but it successfully updates his familiar concoction of sweet, seductive ballads and light funk for the late '90s. Whenever he incorporates light hip-hop rhythms here, it sounds less forced, and the dance numbers are often infectious. Similarly, the ballads have strong (albeit sappy) hooks that make them memorable [...] Time is the most satisfying effort he has released in quite some time." Los Angeles Times critic Connie Johnson found that "what Richie does best is create lush aural valentines – this album’s “Everytime” and “The Closest Thing to Heaven” are beautifully worded, personal-sounding testimonies. He stumbles, however, on his attempts at social commentary. A hybrid of Wyclef Jean and Bob Dylan he's not, so tracks such as “To the Rhythm” are well-intended but lightweight and riddled with cliches."

== Track listing ==
No.	Title	Writer(s)	Producer(s)	Length
1.	"Zoomin'"	Lionel Richie; Lloyd Tolbert; James Anthony Carmichael	Richie; Carmichael	4:23
2.	"I Hear Your Voice"	Richie; Diane Warren; David Foster	Foster	4:00
3.	"Touch"	Richie; Tolbert	Richie; Carmichael	5:08
4.	"Forever"	Richie	Richie; Carmichael	6:13
5.	"Everytime"	Richie	Richie; Carmichael	4:15
6.	"Time"	Richie	Richie; Carmichael	6:11
7.	"To the Rhythm"	Richie; Da Boogie Man	Richie; Carmichael	5:14
8.	"Stay"	Richie; Tolbert	Richie; Carmichael	4:09
9.	"(That's) The Way I Feel"	Richie; Keith Andes	Richie; Carmichael	3:07
10.	"The Closest Thing to Heaven"	Warren	Foster	4:00
11.	"Someday"	Richie; Dinky Bingham; Andre Betts	Richie; Carmichael	4:23
12.	"Lady"	Richie	Richie	4:26

== Personnel ==
Credits adapted from the album's liner notes.

Performers and musicians

- Lionel Richie – lead vocals, keyboards (4–7)
- Michael Boddicker – synthesizers (1, 3–9, 11)
- Lloyd Tolbert – keyboards (1, 3–9, 11), drum programming (1, 3, 7, 8, 11), string arrangements and conductor (3)
- David Foster – keyboards (2, 10, 12), arrangements (2, 10), string arrangements (2), acoustic piano (12)
- Felipe Elgueta – synthesizer programming (2, 10, 12)
- John Hobbs – keyboards (4–6, 9)
- Dean Parks – guitars (2, 9, 10)
- Michael Thompson – guitars (3–6, 8, 10–12)
- Larry Byrom – guitars (4–6, 9)
- Jon Clark – guitars (8)
- Keith Rouster – bass (1, 3, 4, 6–8, 11)
- Joe Chemay – bass (4, 5, 9)
- Nathan East – bass (6, 12)
- John Robinson – drums (2, 12)
- Paul Leim – drums (4–6, 9)
- Guy Roche – drum and percussion programming (10)
- Munyungo Jackson – percussion (1, 3–9, 11)
- William Ross – string arrangements (2)
- James Anthony Carmichael – string arrangements and conductor (4, 5, 9), keyboards (5, 7)
- Ricky Jones – backing vocals (1, 3–9, 11)
- Marva King – backing vocals (1, 3–9, 11)
- Sherrie Woodward – backing vocals (2)
- Sue Ann Carwell – backing vocals (3, 6, 9)
- Jackie Smiley – backing vocals (3, 6, 9)
- Phyllis Williams – backing vocals (6)
- Da Boogie Man – poet vocals (7)
- Jeff Pescetto – backing vocals (10)

Technical and management

- Ralph Price Sutton – engineer (1, 3–9, 11, mixing (1, 3–9, 11, 12)
- Felipe Elgueta – engineer (2, 10, 12)
- David Reitzas – engineer (2, 12)
- Mick Guzauski – mixing (2, 10)
- Vlado Meller – mastering at Sony Music Studios (New York, NY)
- Wherfore Art? – design
- Peter Lindbergh – photography
- David Croker – management
- Melanie Greene – management
- John Reid – management

== Charts ==
Chart (1998)	Peak position
Australian Albums (ARIA)	174
Austrian Albums (Ö3 Austria)	16
Dutch Albums (Album Top 100)	71
French Albums (SNEP)	35
German Albums (Offizielle Top 100)	15
Swiss Albums (Schweizer Hitparade)	6
UK Albums (OCC)	31
US Billboard 200	152
