= Renaissance (Lionel Richie album) =

Lionel Richie album

Studio album by Lionel Richie
- Released: October 16, 2000
- Genres: Pop; dance-pop; R&B
- Length: 52:06 (standard)
- Label: Island Def Jam
- Producers: Skip Miller (exec.); Walter Afanasieff; LaShawn Daniels; Fred Jerkins III; Rodney Jerkins; Brian Rawling; Daryl Simmons; Mark Taylor; Lloyd Tolbert; Joe Wolfe

Lionel Richie chronology
Time (1998)	Renaissance (2000)	Encore (2002)

Renaissance is the sixth studio album by American singer Lionel Richie. It was released by The Island Def Jam Music Group on October 16, 2000 in the United States. A breakaway from his previous two albums Louder Than Words (1996) and Time (1998) which had been released after a decade-long hiatus and featured chief production from James Anthony Carmichael, Richie consulted a team of new collaborators to work with him, including Walter Afanasieff, Brian Rawling, Daryl Simmons, and Mark Taylor as well as Rodney Jerkins and his brother Fred.

Upon release, Renaissance earned largely mixed reviews, with critics comparing it to other Eurodance-influenced, Taylor-produced albums such as Cher's Believe (1998), Enrique Iglesias' Enrique (1999), and Tina Turner's Twenty Four Seven (1999). Commercially, it became Richie's most successful album since Dancing on the Ceiling (1986), particularly in German-speaking Europe, the Netherlands, and the United Kingdom, where it entered the top ten of the albums charts and was certified gold or platinum, respectively. Lead single "Angel", a top ten hit throughout Europe, received a Grammy nomination in the category of Best Dance Recording.

== Critical reception ==
Professional ratings
Aggregate scores
Source	Rating
Metacritic	(48/100)
Review scores
Source	Rating
AllMusic	2/5 stars
Billboard	(favorable)
Entertainment Weekly	C
New York Post	2/4 stars
Rolling Stone	(favourable)
Indianapolis Star	(favourable)

Upon release, Renaissance received mixed reviews from music critics. At Metacritic, which assigns a normalized rating out of 100 to reviews from mainstream critics, the album has an average score of 48 based on 6 reviews, indicating "mixed or average reviews". Billboard wrote that "equal parts Cher's Believe and Enrique Iglesias' Enrique, Renaissance finds Richie in an oh-so-contemporary setting, encompassing uptempo dance, Latin-hued and funky pop, and power ballads [..] While this may sound like a farfetched concept on paper, it works surprisingly well on disc – albeit without breaking any new ground." Rolling Stone critic Richard Skanse described Renaissance as "unabashedly slick adult contemporary fare – file between Eric Clapton's work with Babyface and the last Tina Turner album – but Richie can still write and sing the hell out of a get-you-right-there-where-it-hurts ballad [...] Richie scores a hit with it himself."

AllMusic editor Liana Jonas found that Renaissance was "another post-Commodores album that misses the mark. Most of the songs don't particularly fit any radio format, with the exception of adult contemporary, but that's not the problem. Lacking a radio home doesn't make for a bad recording. It's the material on Renaissance, which is uninteresting, and Richie's voice is often out of place with the music [...] It's painful to hear such floundering work by a performer who listeners know can do better." Entertainment Weekly critic Matt Diehl remarked that "on Reniassance, the soul slickster tries to get back on top with the help of superproducer Rodney Jerkins and by channeling Cher on the Eurodisco "Angel". But the sappy lyrics indicate he hasn’t ended his affair with romantic cliches, and the island rhythms of "Cinderella" call to mind Richie’s own 1983 smash "All Night Long". More a retread than a renaissance."

== Track listing ==
Standard version
No.	Title	Writer(s)	Producer(s)	Length
1.	"Angel" (Metro Mix Album Version)	Lionel Richie; Paul Barry; Mark Taylor	Brian Rawling; Taylor	4:15
2.	"Cinderella"	Richie; Joe Wolfe	Richie; Wolfe	3:42
3.	"Tender Heart"	Richie; Barry; Billy Lawrie	Rawling; Taylor	4:28
4.	"Dance the Night Away"	Richie; Walter Afanasieff	Afanasieff	5:08
5.	"Tonight"	Rodney Jerkins; Fred Jerkins III; Richie; LaShawn Daniels	Jerkins; Daniels^{[a]}	4:31
6.	"How Long"	Richie	Richie; Wolfe	3:55
7.	"Don't You Ever Go Away^{[c]}"	Richie; Lloyd Tolbert	Richie; Tolbert	4:13
8.	"Wasted Time"	Jerkins III; Daniels; Richie; Harvey Mason, Jr.	Jerkins III; Daniels^{[a]}	4:07
9.	"Piece of My Heart"	Richie; Wolfe	Richie; Wolfe	4:15
10.	"It May Be the Water"	Richie; Daryl Simmons	Simmons	4:56
11.	"Here Is My Heart"	Richie; Barry; Taylor	Rawling; Taylor	4:03
12.	"Don't Stop the Music"	Richie; Barry; Taylor	Rawling; Taylor	4:13

International version (bonus track)
No.	Title	Writer(s)	Producer(s)	Length
13.	"Angel" (Boogieman Remix Extended)	Richie; Barry; Taylor	Rawling; Taylor; Boogieman^{[b]}; Island Bros^{[b]}	4:03

European version
No.	Title	Writer(s)	Producer(s)	Length
11.	"Just Can't Say Goodbye"	Richie; Barry; Taylor	Rawling; Taylor	4:08
12.	"Here Is My Heart"	Richie; Barry; Taylor	Rawling; Taylor	4:03
13.	"Don't Stop the Music"	Richie; Barry; Taylor	Rawling; Taylor	4:13

Notes

- ^{^[a]} signifies a vocal producer
- ^{^[b]} signifies a remixer
- ^{^[c]} On some editions, the track "Don't You Ever Go Away" is replaced by "I Forgot".

== Charts ==
=== Weekly charts ===
Chart (2000–01)	Peak position
Austrian Albums (Ö3 Austria)	5
Danish Albums (Hitlisten)	26
Dutch Albums (Album Top 100)	10
Belgian Albums (Ultratop Flanders)	30
French Albums (SNEP)	36
German Albums (Offizielle Top 100)	3
Italian Albums (FIMI)	27
Norwegian Albums (VG-lista)	24
Polish Albums (ZPAV)	16
Scottish Albums (Official Charts)	10
Swedish Albums (Sverigetopplistan)	45
Swiss Albums (Schweizer Hitparade)	6
UK Albums (Official Charts)	6
US Billboard 200	62
US Top R&B/Hip-Hop Albums (Billboard)	54

=== Year-end charts ===
Year-end chart performance for Renaissance by Lionel Richie
Chart (2000)	Position
Dutch Albums (Album Top 100)	74
German Albums (Offizielle Top 100)	71
Swiss Albums (Schweizer Hitparade)	68
Chart (2001)	Position
Canadian Albums (Nielsen SoundScan)	187
Canadian R&B Albums (Nielsen SoundScan)	40
Dutch Albums (Album Top 100)	50
German Albums (Offizielle Top 100)	50
UK Albums (Official Charts)	78

== Certifications and sales ==
Region	Certification	Certified units/sales
Austria (IFPI Austria)	Gold	20,000^{*}
Germany (BVMI)	Platinum	300,000^{^}
Italy (FIMI)	Gold	50,000^{*}
Netherlands (NVPI)	Platinum	80,000^{^}
Switzerland (IFPI Switzerland)	Gold	20,000^{^}
United Kingdom (BPI)	Platinum	300,000^{^}
Summaries
Europe (IFPI)	Platinum	1,000,000^{*}
Worldwide	—	1,000,000
^{*} Sales figures based on certification alone.^{^} Shipments figures based on certification alone.
