= Don't Wanna Lose You (Lionel Richie song) =

Single by Lionel Richie

from the album Louder Than Words
- Released: March 1996
- Length: 5:01
- Label: Mercury
- Songwriters: James Harris III; Terry Lewis; Lionel Richie
- Producer: Jimmy Jam and Terry Lewis

Lionel Richie singles chronology
"Love, Oh Love" (1992)	"Don't Wanna Lose You" (1996)	"Ordinary Girl" (1996)

"Don't Wanna Lose You" is a song by American singer and songwriter Lionel Richie. It was written by Richie along with James Harris III and Terry Lewis for his fourth studio album, Louder Than Words (1996), while production was helmed by Harris and Lewis under their production moniker Jimmy Jam and Terry Lewis. The song was released in March 1996 by Mercury Records and reached numbers 39 and 42 on the US Billboard Hot 100 and Cash Box Top 100 charts, becoming Richie's final top-40 hit. It also peaked at number 17 on the UK Singles Chart and charted in Australia, Austria, Germany, the Netherlands, New Zealand, Sweden and Switzerland.

== Critical reception ==
Larry Flick from Billboard magazine wrote, "Richie ends a lengthy break from recording with a smooth, rhythmic ballad that eagle-ears will quickly compare to his classic Commodores hit 'Just to Be Close to You'. There is a sweet, unmistakable melodic vibe linking the two songs—creating a warm familiarity that will help raise the interest and awareness of radio programmers at top 40, R&B, and AC. It is nice to have Richie's friendly baritone back on active duty, and producers Jimmy Jam and Terry Lewis have treated it with proper respect and TLC, as evident in the lush arrangement of quiet funk guitars and sweet strings."

== Track listing ==
CD single
No.	Title	Writer(s)	Producer(s)	Length
1.	"Don't Wanna Lose You" (Radio Edit)	Lionel Richie; James Harris III; Terry Lewis	Jimmy Jam and Terry Lewis	4:37
2.	"Don't Wanna Lose You" (Album Version)	Richie; Harris; Lewis	Jimmy Jam and Terry Lewis	4:57
3.	"What Do They Know"	Richie	Richie; James Anthony Carmichael	3:49
4.	"Don't Wanna Lose You" (Radio With Talk)	Richie; Harris; Lewis	Jimmy Jam and Terry Lewis	4:37
5.	"Hello"	Richie	Richie; Carmichael	4:07

== Credits and personnel ==
Credits lifted from the album's liner notes.

- James Harris III – producer, writer
- Steve Hodge – mixing
- Terry Lewis – producer, writer
- Lionel Richie – vocals, writer

== Charts ==
=== Weekly charts ===
Chart (1996)	Peak position
Australia (ARIA)	53
Austria (Ö3 Austria Top 40)	34
Germany (GfK)	66
Netherlands (Single Top 100)	28
New Zealand (Recorded Music NZ)	43
Sweden (Sverigetopplistan)	57
Switzerland (Schweizer Hitparade)	32
UK Singles (Official Charts)	17
US Billboard Hot 100	39
US Adult Contemporary (Billboard)	5
US Hot R&B/Hip-Hop Songs (Billboard)	17
US Cash Box Top 100	42

=== Year-end charts ===
Chart (1996)	Position
US Hot R&B/Hip-Hop Songs (Billboard)	89

== Release history ==
List of release dates, showing region, formats, label, and reference
Region	Date	Format(s)	Label	Ref.
United States	March 6, 1996	Radio	Mercury Records	
United States	March 26, 1996	CD; cassette	Mercury Records	
