= Louder Than Words (album) =

1996 album by Lionel Richie

Studio album by Lionel Richie
- Released: April 16, 1996
- Studios: Record Plant, Manor Studio, Speeding Bullet Sound and Cochrane Studios (Los Angeles, California); Conway Studios, Ocean Way Recording, Capitol Studios, A&M Studios and The Tracken Place (Hollywood, California); Encore Studios and Warner Bros. Recording Studios (Burbank, California); The Hit Factory (New York City, New York); Flyte Time Studios (Edina, Minnesota)
- Genre: R&B
- Length: 67:05
- Label: Mercury
- Producers: James Anthony Carmichael; David Foster; Jimmy Jam and Terry Lewis; Lionel Richie

Lionel Richie chronology
Back to Front (1992)	Louder Than Words (1996)	Truly: The Love Songs (1997)

Singles from Louder Than Words
- 1. "Don't Wanna Lose You" Released: March 11, 1996; 2. "Ordinary Girl" Released: August 19, 1996; 3. "Still in Love" Released: November 11, 1996 (UK); 4. "Climbing" Released: November 11, 1996 (Netherlands); 5. "Can't Get Over You" Released: 1996 (France)

Louder Than Words is the fourth studio album by American singer Lionel Richie. It was released by Mercury Records on April 16, 1996, in the United States. The album marked Richie's debut with the record label as well as his first album of new material in 10 years after a longer hiatus during which he went through a much-publicized divorce from his first wife Brenda Harvey and the loss of his father and a close friend. Apart from chief producer James Anthony Carmichael, the singer worked with Jimmy Jam and Terry Lewis, Babyface and David Foster on Louder Than Words.

Upon release, the album earned generally mixed to positive review from music critics, many of whom praised Richie's vocal performances and the ballads on the album but found the overall material old-fashioned. Commercially, Louder Than Words failed to reprise the success of Richies's previous multi-platinum studio albums Can't Slow Down (1983) and Dancing on the Ceiling (1986), though it entered the top thirty on the majority of the album charts it appeared on, going gold in France and the US and silver in the United Kingdom.

== Background ==
Following years of intense touring and recording, Richie was suffering from burnout symptoms by March 1986. While he only intended to take a year off, his father, Lionel Richie Sr., fell ill before dying in 1990. After his death, Richie struggled with what he described as "a massive depression". At the same time, he was divorcing from his first wife Brenda Harvey after nearly two decades of marriage. Right after that, amid the release of his first compilation album Back to Front (1992) and the pre-production of a new studio album, his best friend informed Richie that he was dying from AIDS-related causes. It was not until his passing, that Richie felt ready to produce new music. Welcoming his second child, son Miles, with his second wife Diane Alexander in May 1994 eventually helped jumpstarting a return to recording. In a 2018 interview with People magazine, Richie commented: "They didn’t know what the hell I did for a living so I thought at that particular point, let’s go back and prove to the kids what I do. And so that was the incentive. I realized, this is what I should be doing."

== Critical reception ==
Professional ratings
Review scores
Source	Rating
AllMusic	2.5/5 stars
Billboard	(favorable)
Robert Christgau	(neither)
Entertainment Weekly	B+
The Guardian	2/5 stars
Los Angeles Times	3/4 stars
USA Today	3/4 stars

AllMusic editor Stephen Thomas Erlewine found that "although there are some slight attempts to incorporate new jack and hip-hop influences into Richie's sound, Louder Than Words relies on his trademark balladeering, which remains his forte. All of the weak moments on Louder Than Words are ill-advised forays into rap – to put it bluntly, he can rap about as well as Snoop Dogg can sing. Although the ballads aren't as strong as his late-'70s and early-'80s standards, they are nevertheless pleasant, which makes the record a worthwhile purchase for fans." Chicago Tribune critic Calvin Wilson declared the album "a mixed bag. Some of the selections are little more than filler – but when Richie is fully engaged, he comes up with music that's truly exhilarating. To be sure, Richie understands what's expected of him."

Cheo Hodari Coker, writing for the Los Angeles Times, called the album a "welcome return" and wrote: "From beginning to end, Louder Than Words is palatable enough for the crossover crowd, but also soulful enough for his now-older black female fans, many of whom moved on to Babyface in Richie’s absence. The elegant “Don’t Wanna Lose You,” the uncharacteristically sensual "Say I Do" and the easygoing jam "Ordinary Girl" show that Richie hasn't lost any of his charm or compositional powers." Entertainment Weekly critic J.D. Considine remarked that "Richie’s middle-of-the-road R&B may as well be from another century. It isn’t that he can’t work a groove; what makes Richie seem so old-fashioned is that he doesn’t understand that these days the groove is everything. A pity, because even if he hasn’t kept up with the times, he has grown [...] Even if Louder Than Words doesn’t put him back on top of the charts, it’s proof that Richie is on top of his game."

== Chart performance ==
In the United States, Louder Than Words debuted at number 33 on the US Billboard 200 with first weeks sales of 28,000 copies. It peaked at number 28.

== Track listing ==
No.	Title	Writer(s)	Producer(s)	Length
1.	"Piece of Love"	Booker T. Jones; Marva King; Jeff Byrd	Richie; James Anthony Carmichael	4:04
2.	"Still in Love"	Richie	Richie; Carmichael; Humberto Gatica^{[a]}	4:33
3.	"I Wanna Take You Down"	James Harris III; Terry Lewis	Richie; Jimmy Jam and Terry Lewis	5:01
4.	"Can't Get Over You"	Richie	Richie; Carmichael	4:33
5.	"Change"	Richie; David Cochrane	Richie; Carmichael	5:01
6.	"Nothing Else Matters"	Richie	Richie; Carmichael	4:34
7.	"Ordinary Girl"	Richie; Babyface	Richie; Carmichael	5:01
8.	"Say I Do"	Harris; Lewis; James Wright	Jimmy Jam and Terry Lewis	5:01
9.	"Paradise"	Richie; Lloyd Tolbert	Richie; Carmichael	5:02
10.	"Don't Wanna Lose You"	Richie; Harris; Lewis	Jimmy Jam and Terry Lewis	5:01
11.	"Now You're Gone"	Richie	Richie; Carmichael	5:43
12.	"Lovers at First Sight"	Richie	Richie; Carmichael	6:59
13.	"Climbing"	Richie	Richie; David Foster	6:26

Italian bonus track
No.	Title	Writer(s)	Producer(s)	Length
14.	"Amo, T'Amo, Ti Amo"	Richie; Alberto Testa; Tony Renis	Richie; Carmichael; Gatica^{[a]}	4:04

Japanese bonus track
No.	Title	Writer(s)	Producer(s)	Length
13.	"What Do They Know"	Richie	Richie; Carmichael	4:04
14.	"Climbing"	Richie	Richie; Foster	6:26

Notes

- ^{^[a]} signifies a co-producer

== Personnel ==
Credits lifted from the album's liner notes.

Performers and musicians

- Lionel Richie – lead vocals, backing vocals (1, 4, 5, 7, 9, 10), keyboards (2, 11), rhythm arrangements (5), tenor sax solo (11), acoustic piano (12)
- Michael Boddicker – synthesizers (1, 2, 4–6, 9, 11, 12)
- Lloyd Tolbert – keyboards (1, 4, 9, 11), synth bass (1), drum programming (1, 2, 4, 9, 11), rhythm arrangements (9)
- Greg Phillinganes – keyboards (1, 11, 12), acoustic piano (5), synth bass (9)
- John Barnes – synthesizers (2, 6, 11)
- James Anthony Carmichael – keyboards (2, 4), string arrangements and conductor (2, 4, 6, 7, 11), rhythm arrangements (5), horn arrangements and conductor (11)
- Simon Franglen – synthesizers (2, 7, 11)
- James "Big Jim" Wright – keyboards (3, 8, 10)
- Jimmy Jam – all other instruments (3, 8, 10)
- Terry Lewis – all other instruments (3, 8, 10)
- David Cochran – synthesizers (5), guitars (5), drum programming (5), saxophone (5), horn and rhythm arrangements (5)
- Steve Porcaro – synthesizers (6, 13), programming (13), rhythm arrangements (13)
- Tony Smith – programming (6, 12)
- Babyface – keyboards (7), drum programming (7), backing vocals (7)
- Claude Gaudette – synthesizers (13)
- William Ross – synthesizers (13)
- David Paich – keyboards (13), rhythm arrangements (13)
- Michael Thompson – guitars (1, 2, 4–6, 9, 11, 12)
- Timothy May – guitars (2)
- Dean Parks – guitars (2, 12)
- Mike Scott – guitars (3, 8, 10)
- Robert Palmer – guitars (5)
- Steve Lukather – guitars (13)
- Sekou Bunch – bass guitar (4, 6)
- Nathan East – bass guitar (6, 7, 12)
- Randy Jackson – bass guitar (11, 12)
- Alex Richbourg – drum programming (3)
- Ricky Lawson – drums (6)
- John Robinson – drums (7)
- Jeff Taylor – drum programming (8)
- Chris Dave – drums (10)
- Omar Hakim – drums (11, 12)
- Jeff Porcaro – drums (13)
- Paulinho da Costa – percussion (2, 4, 7, 11)
- Michael Fisher – percussion (13)
- Tommy Morgan – harmonica (2)
- Toots Thielemans – harmonica (6)
- Brandon Fields – saxophones (6, 12)
- Dan Higgins – saxophones (6, 12)
- Kim Hutchcroft – saxophones (12)
- George Bohanon – trombone (6), French horn (12)
- Andrew Martin – trombone (6)
- Bill Reichenbach, Jr. – trombone (12)
- Jerry Hey – trumpet (1)
- Darrel Anthony Browning – trumpet (5)
- Daniel Fornero – trumpet (6)
- Oscar Brashear – trumpet (6, 12)
- Gary Grant – trumpet (6, 12)
- Charles Davis – trumpet (12)
- Warren Luening – trumpet (12)
- Don Waldrup – tuba (6)
- John Dickson – French horn (6)
- Marylin Johnson – French horn (6)
- Brad Warnaar – French horn (6, 12)
- David Duke – French horn (12)
- Brian O'Connor – French horn (12)
- Jeremy Lubbock – string arrangements and conductor (6, 12)
- Marva King – backing vocals (1, 4, 5, 7, 9, 11), BGV arrangements (1, 9)
- 4.0 – backing vocals (3, 8)
- Phillip Ingram – backing vocals (4, 5)
- Arnold McCuller – backing vocals (4, 7, 9)
- Peter Gabriel – backing vocals (7)
- Ayub Ogada – backing vocals (7)
- Sue Ann Carwell – backing vocals (11)

Technical

- Calvin Harris – engineer and mixing (1, 2, 4–7, 9, 11)
- Milton Chen – engineer (1, 2, 5, 9, 12), assistant engineer
- Barney Perkins – engineer (2, 6, 11, 12)
- Steve Hodge – engineer and mixing (3, 8, 10)
- Jeff Taylor – engineer (3, 8, 10), assistant engineer
- Fred Law – engineer (4, 9)
- Humberto Gatica – engineer (6, 13), mixing (13)
- John Jessel – engineer (6)
- Brad Gilderman – engineer (7)
- David Reitzas – engineer (13)
- Drake Ayen – assistant engineer
- David Betencourt – assistant engineer
- Craig Brock – assistant engineer
- Darrel Anthony Browning – assistant engineer
- Jim Champange – assistant engineer
- Michael W. Douglass – assistant engineer
- Gasten Kamal Graham – assistant engineer
- Patrick Karamian – assistant engineer
- Bill Kinsley – assistant engineer
- Bill Leonard – assistant engineer
- Doug Michael – assistant engineer
- Jennifer Monnar – assistant engineer
- Pierre Monroe – assistant engineer
- Jim Nelson – assistant engineer
- John Nelson – assistant engineer
- Kenny Ochoa – assistant engineer
- Sean O'Dwyer – assistant engineer
- Greg Pinto – assistant engineer
- Alex Reed – assistant engineer
- Mike Retter – assistant engineer
- Rail Rogut – assistant engineer
- Bill Smith – assistant engineer
- John Srebalus – assistant engineer
- Ken Villeneuve – assistant engineer
- Guy Costa – mastering at Quadim Studio (Westlake Village, California)
- Ivy Skoff – production coordinator
- John Coulter – art direction, design
- Alan Silfen – art direction, design, photography
- Erin Flanagan – styling
- Freddy Demann – management

== Charts ==
=== Weekly charts ===
Chart (1996)	Peak position
Australian Albums (ARIA)	32
Austrian Albums (Ö3 Austria)	12
Belgian Albums (Ultratop Flanders)	25
Belgian Albums (Ultratop Wallonia)	21
Dutch Albums (Album Top 100)	6
French Albums (SNEP)	38
German Albums (Offizielle Top 100)	26
New Zealand Albums (RMNZ)	31
Norwegian Albums (VG-lista)	29
Swedish Albums (Sverigetopplistan)	21
Swiss Albums (Schweizer Hitparade)	10
UK Albums (Official Charts)	11
US Billboard 200	28

=== Year-end charts ===
Chart (1996)	Position
Dutch Albums (Album Top 100)	60

== Certifications ==
Region	Certification	Certified units/sales
France (SNEP)	Gold	100,000^{*}
United Kingdom (BPI)	Silver	60,000^{^}
United States (RIAA)	Gold	500,000^{^}
^{*} Sales figures based on certification alone.^{^} Shipments figures based on certification alone.

== Release history ==
List of release dates, showing region, formats, label, and reference
Region	Date	Format(s)	Label	Ref.
Europe	April 9, 1996	CD; cassette	Mercury Records	
United States	April 16, 1996	CD; cassette	Mercury Records	
