= Do It to Me =

1992 single by Lionel Richie

Single by Lionel Richie

from the album Back to Front
- Released: April 27, 1992
- Genre: R&B; quiet storm; soft rock
- Length: 6:03
- Label: Motown
- Songwriter: Lionel Richie
- Producers: Stewart Levine; Lionel Richie

Lionel Richie singles chronology
"Se La" (1987)	"Do It to Me" (1992)	"My Destiny" (1992)

Music video
- "Do It to Me" on YouTube

"Do It to Me" is a song by American singer-songwriter Lionel Richie. The song was written by Richie, and produced by himself and Stewart Levine. It was released on April 27, 1992 by Motown Records as the first single from his first compilation album, Back to Front (1992). The song spent one week at number one on the US Billboard Hot R&B Singles chart and peaked at number 21 on the Billboard Hot 100. "Do It to Me" also achieved some success in European countries, becoming a top ten hit in France and Norway. The song samples the drum break "Sneakin' in the Back" by Tom Scott.

== Critical reception ==
Bryan Buss from AllMusic described the song as "classic, smooth Richie". US magazine Cash Box wrote, "This is quite a surprise. Lionel Richie is back and in full thrust with the first single taken off his upcoming Back To Front album." The reviewer added, "Being away from the industry for such a long period of time, you would think that he would be a little "rusty", but listening to this single, one can hear an improvement in his entire sound. Put a catchy beat, some nice chords and melodies to a legend's vocals, and you have a hit." Bill Wyman from Entertainment Weekly called it "a pallid single".

== Track listings ==
- CD and 7-inch single
1. "Do It to Me" (single radio edit) – 4:37
2. "Ballerina Girl" – 3:35
- CD maxi
1. "Do It to Me" (single radio edit)
2. "Do It to Me" (instrumental)
3. "Do It to Me" (extended version)
4. "Ballerina Girl"

== Charts ==
=== Weekly charts ===
Chart (1992)	Peak position
Australia (ARIA)	41
Austria (Ö3 Austria Top 40)	23
Belgium (Ultratop 50 Flanders)	11
Europe (European Dance Radio)	4
Europe (European Hit Radio)	1
France (SNEP)	6
Germany (GfK)	26
Netherlands (Dutch Top 40)	15
Netherlands (Single Top 100)	12
New Zealand (Recorded Music NZ)	29
Norway (VG-lista)	7
Switzerland (Schweizer Hitparade)	12
UK Singles (Official Charts)	33
UK Airplay (Music Week)	18
US Billboard Hot 100	21
US Adult Contemporary (Billboard)	3
US Hot R&B/Hip-Hop Songs (Billboard)	1
US Cash Box Top 100	20

=== Year-end charts ===
Chart (1992)	Position
Belgium (Ultratop)	78
Brazil (Crowley)	56
Europe (European Hit Radio)	8
Germany (Media Control)	83
US Adult Contemporary (Billboard)	21
US Hot R&B Singles (Billboard)	43

== See also ==
- List of number-one R&B singles of 1992 (U.S.)
