= Mark Taylor (music producer) =

British record producer and songwriter

- Born: 1970 (age 55–56); England
- Origin: Great Britain
- Occupations: Record producer and Songwriter

Mark Taylor (born 1970 in Windsor, England) is a British record producer and songwriter. He has worked with artists such as Cher, Tina Turner, Lady Gaga, Nelly Furtado, Lionel Richie, Hall & Oates, Rod Stewart, Belinda Carlisle, Daniel Bedingfield, Ronan Keating, Enrique Iglesias, Britney Spears, James Morrison, Kylie Minogue, Jennifer Lopez. Taylor worked on Cher's 1998 album Believe, with whom he won a Grammy for its title track. The album went on to sell over 20 million copies worldwide. The song "Believe" featured an early example of the vocal effect auto tune.

== Songwriting and production credits ==
Title	Year	Artist	Album	Songwriter	Producer			
Title	Year	Artist	Album	Songwriter	Primary	Secondary	Additional	Vocal
"Believe"	1998	Cher	Believe		Yes			
"Runaway"	1998	Cher	Believe	Yes	Yes			
"All or Nothing"	1998	Cher	Believe	Yes	Yes			
"Strong Enough"	1998	Cher	Believe	Yes	Yes			
"Dov'è l'amore"	1998	Cher	Believe	Yes	Yes			
"Takin' Back My Heart"	1998	Cher	Believe		Yes			
"Now That You're Gone"	1999	Mike + the Mechanics	M6		Yes			
"When the Heartache Is Over"	1999	Tina Turner	Twenty Four Seven		Yes			
"Don't Leave Me This Way"	1999	Tina Turner	Twenty Four Seven	Yes	Yes			
"Rhythm Divine"	1999	Enrique Iglesias	Enrique	Yes	Yes			
"Be With You"	1999	Enrique Iglesias	Enrique	Yes	Yes			
"Bailamos"	1999	Enrique Iglesias	Enrique	Yes	Yes			
"Ritmo Total" (Rhythm Divine)	1999	Enrique Iglesias	Enrique	Yes	Yes			
"Stronger"	1999	Gary Barlow	Twelve Months, Eleven Days		Yes			
"Viva La Musica"	2000	Gipsyland	Viva La Musica		Yes			
"Torito"	2000	Gipsyland	Viva La Musica		Yes			
"Ana Maria"	2000	Gipsyland	Viva La Musica		Yes			
"La Bodega"	2000	Gipsyland	Viva La Musica		Yes			
"La Quiero, No, No"	2000	Gipsyland	Viva La Musica		Yes			
"La Droga"	2000	Gipsyland	Viva La Musica		Yes			
"Me Siento Triste"	2000	Gipsyland	Viva La Musica		Yes			
"Cantame Gitano"	2000	Gipsyland	Viva La Musica		Yes			
"Mama"	2000	Gipsyland	Viva La Musica		Yes			
"Me Va Me Va"	2000	Gipsyland	Viva La Musica		Yes			
"Amigo De Verdad"	2000	Gipsyland	Viva La Musica		Yes			
"Ole Ola"	2000	Gipsyland	Viva La Musica		Yes			
"Santa Sarah"	2000	Gipsyland	Viva La Musica		Yes			
"Hang On in There Baby"	2000	Curiosity	Back to Front		Yes			
"Gimme the Sunshine"	2000	Curiosity	Back to Front		Yes			
"Could I Have This Kiss Forever" (with Enrique Iglesias)	2000	Whitney Houston	Whitney: The Greatest Hits		Yes			
"On a Night Like This"	2000	Kylie Minogue	Light Years	Yes	Yes			
"Angel"	2000	Lionel Richie	Renaissance	Yes	Yes			
"Tender Heart"	2000	Lionel Richie	Renaissance		Yes			
"Just Can't Say Goodbye"	2000	Lionel Richie	Renaissance	Yes	Yes			
"Here is My Heart"	2000	Lionel Richie	Renaissance	Yes	Yes			
"Don't Stop the Music"	2000	Lionel Richie	Renaissance	Yes	Yes			
"Livin' for Love"	2000	Natalie Cole	The Greatest Hits, Vol. 1		Yes			
"Hero"	2001	Enrique Iglesias	Escape	Yes	Yes			
"Chain Reaction"	2001	Steps	Gold: Greatest Hits		Yes			
"E Sara' A Settembre (Someone Like You)"	2001	Andrea Bocelli	Cieli di Toscana		Yes			
"L' Incontro" (featuring Bono)	2001	Andrea Bocelli	Cieli di Toscana		Yes			
"L'Ultimo Re"	2001	Andrea Bocelli	Cieli di Toscana		Yes			
"Love to See You Cry"	2001	Enrique Iglesias	Escape	Yes	Yes			
"One Night Stand"	2001	Enrique Iglesias	Escape	Yes	Yes			
"She Be the One"	2001	Enrique Iglesias	Escape	Yes	Yes			
"Heroe"	2001	Enrique Iglesias	Escape	Yes	Yes			
"Surrender"	2002	Laura Pausini	From the Inside			Yes		
"If You're Not the One"	2002	Daniel Bedingfield	Gotta Get Thru This		Yes			
"Honest Questions"	2002	Daniel Bedingfield	Gotta Get Thru This		Yes			
"Never Gonna Leave Your Side"	2002	Daniel Bedingfield	Gotta Get Thru This		Yes			
"Miss America"	2002	Nick Carter	Now or Never	Yes	Yes			
"To Love a Woman" (featuring Enrique Iglesias)	2002	Lionel Richie	Encore		Yes			
"Breathe on Me"	2003	Britney Spears	In the Zone		Yes			
"Turn It On Again"	2003	Ronan Keating	Turn It On		Yes			
"She Gets Me Inside"	2003	Ronan Keating	Turn It On		Yes			
"First Time"	2003	Ronan Keating	Turn It On	Yes	Yes			
"Let Her Down Easy"	2003	Ronan Keating	Turn It On		Yes			
"She Believes (In Me)"	2003	Ronan Keating	Turn It On		Yes			
"The Best of Me"	2003	Ronan Keating	Turn It On		Yes			
"Hold You Now"	2003	Ronan Keating	Turn It On	Yes	Yes			
"I Wouldn't Change a Thing"	2003	Ronan Keating	Turn It On	Yes	Yes			
"Not in Love"	2003	Enrique Iglesias	7	Yes	Yes			
"California Callin'"	2003	Enrique Iglesias	7	Yes	Yes			
"Addicted"	2003	Enrique Iglesias	7	Yes	Yes			
"Free"	2003	Enrique Iglesias	7		Yes			
"Be Yourself"	2003	Enrique Iglesias	7		Yes			
"Wish You Were Here (With Me)"	2003	Enrique Iglesias	7	Yes	Yes			
"You Rock Me"	2003	Enrique Iglesias	7	Yes	Yes			
"Adicto"	2003	Enrique Iglesias	7	Yes	Yes			
"Batcha Never"	2004	Cherie	Cherie		Yes			
"I Belong"	2004	Cherie	Cherie		Yes			
"Never Gone"	2005	Backstreet Boys	Never Gone		Yes			
"Unbelievable"	2005	Craig David	The Story Goes...	Yes	Yes			
"Wish I Was Over You"	2005	Jo O'Meara	Relentless	Yes	Yes			
"And Then We Kiss" (Junkie XL remix)	2005	Britney Spears	B in the Mix: The Remixes	Yes		Yes		
"All Over Again" (featuring Kate Rusby)	2006	Ronan Keating	Bring You Home		Yes			
"Friends in Time"	2006	Ronan Keating	Bring You Home		Yes			
"This I Promise You"	2006	Ronan Keating	Bring You Home	Yes	Yes			
"Iris"	2006	Ronan Keating	Bring You Home		Yes			
"Superman"	2006	Ronan Keating	Bring You Home		Yes			
"It's So Easy Lovin' You"	2006	Ronan Keating	Bring You Home		Yes			
"Bring You Home"	2006	Ronan Keating	Bring You Home	Yes	Yes			
"Hello Again"	2006	Ronan Keating	Bring You Home		Yes			
"Just When I'd Given Up Dreaming"	2006	Ronan Keating	Bring You Home		Yes			
"(We Just Need) Time"	2006	Ronan Keating	Bring You Home		Yes			
"So Far Away"	2006	Ronan Keating	Bring You Home	Yes	Yes			
"Introducing The Brand"	2006	The Ordinary Boys	How To Get Everything You Ever Wanted In Ten Easy Steps		Yes			
"Lonely At The Top"	2006	The Ordinary Boys	How To Get Everything You Ever Wanted In Ten Easy Steps	Yes	Yes			
"The Great Big Rip Off"	2006	The Ordinary Boys	How To Get Everything You Ever Wanted In Ten Easy Steps		Yes			
"Club Chez-Moi"	2006	The Ordinary Boys	How To Get Everything You Ever Wanted In Ten Easy Steps		Yes			
"I Luv U"	2006	The Ordinary Boys	How To Get Everything You Ever Wanted In Ten Easy Steps		Yes			
"Nine2Five"	2006	The Ordinary Boys	How To Get Everything You Ever Wanted In Ten Easy Steps		Yes			
"Commercial Breakdown"	2006	The Ordinary Boys	How To Get Everything You Ever Wanted In Ten Easy Steps		Yes			
"Ballad of an Unrequited Self-Love Affair"	2006	The Ordinary Boys	How To Get Everything You Ever Wanted In Ten Easy Steps		Yes			
"The Higher The Highs"	2006	The Ordinary Boys	How To Get Everything You Ever Wanted In Ten Easy Steps		Yes			
"Shut Your Mouth"	2006	The Ordinary Boys	How To Get Everything You Ever Wanted In Ten Easy Steps		Yes			
"We've Got The Best Job Ever"	2006	The Ordinary Boys	How To Get Everything You Ever Wanted In Ten Easy Steps		Yes			
"Walking On The Faultlines (The Ultimate Step)"	2006	The Ordinary Boys	How To Get Everything You Ever Wanted In Ten Easy Steps		Yes			
"Thank You And Goodnight"	2006	The Ordinary Boys	How To Get Everything You Ever Wanted In Ten Easy Steps		Yes			
"Who's That Boy?"	2006	The Ordinary Boys	How To Get Everything You Ever Wanted In Ten Easy Steps		Yes			
"Boys Will Be Boys"	2006	The Ordinary Boys	How To Get Everything You Ever Wanted In Ten Easy Steps		Yes			
"Little Girl"	2007	Enrique Iglesias	Insomniac	Yes	Yes			
"Don't You Forget About Me"	2007	Enrique Iglesias	Insomniac	Yes	Yes			
"You Make It Real"	2008	James Morrison	Songs for You, Truths for Me		Yes			
"Broken Strings" (featuring Nelly Furtado)	2008	James Morrison	Songs for You, Truths for Me		Yes			
"Nothing Ever Hurt Like You"	2008	James Morrison	Songs for You, Truths for Me	Yes	Yes			
"3 Little Words"	2008	Frankmusik	Complete Me				Yes	
"The First Thing"	2009	Esmée Denters	Outta Here	Yes	Yes			
"When You're Around"	2009	Frankmusik	Complete Me				Yes	
"Standing Tears Apart"	2009	Remi Nicole	Cupid Shoot Me		Yes			
"Cupid Shoot Me"	2009	Remi Nicole	Cupid Shoot Me		Yes			
"In My Dreams"	2009	Remi Nicole	Cupid Shoot Me		Yes			
"Nice Boy"	2009	Remi Nicole	Cupid Shoot Me		Yes			
"Loveless"	2009	Remi Nicole	Cupid Shoot Me		Yes			
"Another Day"	2009	Remi Nicole	Cupid Shoot Me		Yes			
"Broken Hearted People"	2009	Remi Nicole	Cupid Shoot Me				Yes	
"Come Find Me"	2009	Remi Nicole	Cupid Shoot Me		Yes			
"Going It Alone"	2009	Remi Nicole	Cupid Shoot Me		Yes			
"I'll Be Waiting"	2009	Remi Nicole	Cupid Shoot Me		Yes			
"Love Me So"	2009	Remi Nicole	Cupid Shoot Me		Yes			
"I Don't Know How"	2009	Remi Nicole	Cupid Shoot Me		Yes			
"Heartbeat" (featuring Nicole Scherzinger)	2010	Enrique Iglesias	Euphoria	Yes	Yes			
"Welcome to Burlesque"	2010	Cher	Burlesque: OST					Yes
"You Haven't Seen the Last of Me"	2010	Cher	Burlesque: OST					Yes
"Don't Say Goodbye"	2010	Olly Murs	Olly Murs	Yes	Yes			
"Heartbreaker"	2011	Enrique Iglesias	Euphoria	Yes	Yes			
"Coming Home"	2011	Enrique Iglesias	Euphoria	Yes	Yes			
"I Won't Let You Go"	2011	James Morrison	The Awakening		Yes			
"Up" (featuring Jessie J)	2011	James Morrison	The Awakening		Yes			
"Glitter & Gold"	2011	Rebecca Ferguson	Heaven		Yes			
"Love & Hate"	2012	Marcus Collins	Marcus Collins	Yes	Yes			
"That's Just Life"	2012	Marcus Collins	Marcus Collins	Yes	Yes			
"Buildings and Treetops"	2012	Nell Bryden	Non-album single		Yes			
"White and Black"	2013	Josh Kumra	Good Things Come to Those; Who Wait		Yes			
"Take It Like a Man"	2013	Cher	Closer to the Truth		Yes			
"My Love"	2013	Cher	Closer to the Truth		Yes			
"Dressed to Kill"	2013	Cher	Closer to the Truth	Yes	Yes			
"Lovers Forever"	2013	Cher	Closer to the Truth		Yes			
"Sirens"	2013	Cher	Closer to the Truth	Yes	Yes			
"I Hope You Find It"	2013	Cher	Closer to the Truth		Yes			
"That's Alright with Me"	2013	Olly Murs	Right Place Right Time	Yes	Yes			
"Beautiful" (with Kylie Minogue)	2014	Enrique Iglesias	Sex and Love / Kiss; Me Once	Yes	Yes			
"Only a Woman"	2014	Enrique Iglesias	Sex and Love	Yes	Yes			
"Always"	2015	Ella Eyre	Feline	Yes	Yes			
"I Need You Tonight"	2015	James Morrison	Higher Than Here	Yes	Yes			
"Sticks and Stones"	2017	Nelly Furtado	The Ride	Yes		Yes		
"Phoenix"	2017	Nelly Furtado	The Ride	Yes				
"Bliss"	2017	Nelly Furtado	The Ride	Yes				
"The Letter"	2017	Mike + the Mechanics	Let Me Fly	Yes	Yes			
"I'll Be There for You"	2017	Mike + the Mechanics	Let Me Fly	Yes	Yes			
"Raining Glitter"	2018	Kylie Minogue	Golden	Yes	Yes			
"Gimme! Gimme! Gimme! (A Man After Midnight)"	2018	Cher	Dancing Queen		Yes			
"SOS"	2018	Cher	Dancing Queen		Yes			
"One of Us"	2018	Cher	Dancing Queen		Yes			
"Dancing Queen"	2018	Cher	Dancing Queen		Yes			
"The Name of the Game"	2018	Cher	Dancing Queen		Yes			
"Waterloo"	2018	Cher	Dancing Queen		Yes			
"Mamma Mia"	2018	Cher	Dancing Queen		Yes			
"Chiquitita"	2018	Cher	Dancing Queen		Yes			
"Fernando"	2018	Cher	Dancing Queen					Yes
"The Winner Takes It All"	2018	Cher	Dancing Queen		Yes			
"My Love Goes On" ( Featuring Joss Stone)	2019	James Morrison	You're Stronger Than You Know		Yes			
"Brighter Kind Of Love"	2019	James Morrison	You're Stronger Than You Know		Yes			
"So Beautiful"	2019	James Morrison	You're Stronger Than You Know		Yes			
"Feels Like The First Time"	2019	James Morrison	You're Stronger Than You Know	Yes	Yes			
"Glorious"	2019	James Morrison	You're Stronger Than You Know		Yes			
"Power"	2019	James Morrison	You're Stronger Than You Know		Yes			
"Slowly"	2019	James Morrison	You're Stronger Than You Know		Yes			
"Ruins"	2019	James Morrison	You're Stronger Than You Know		Yes			
"I Still Need You"	2019	James Morrison	You're Stronger Than You Know	Yes	Yes			
"Don't Wanna Lose You Now"	2019	James Morrison	You're Stronger Than You Know	Yes	Yes			
"Cross The Line"	2019	James Morrison	You're Stronger Than You Know		Yes			
"Until The Stars Go Out"	2019	James Morrison	You're Stronger Than You Know	Yes	Yes			
"DJ Play a Christmas Song"	2023	Cher	Christmas		Yes			
"What Christmas Means to Me" (with Stevie Wonder)	2023	Cher	Christmas		Yes			
"Run Rudolph Run"	2023	Cher	Christmas		Yes			
"Christmas (Baby Please Come Home)" (with Darlene Love)	2023	Cher	Christmas		Yes			
"Angels in the Snow"	2023	Cher	Christmas		Yes			
"Home" (with Michael Bublé)	2023	Cher	Christmas		Yes			
"Please Come Home for Christmas"	2023	Cher	Christmas		Yes			
"I Like Christmas"	2023	Cher	Christmas		Yes			
"Christmas Ain't Christmas Without You"	2023	Cher	Christmas	Yes	Yes			
"Santa Baby"	2023	Cher	Christmas		Yes			
"Put a Little Holiday in Your Heart" (with Cyndi Lauper)	2023	Cher	Christmas		Yes			
"This Will Be Our Year"	2023	Cher	Christmas		Yes			
