= Sail On (song) =

- Side A variant of the original US single

Single by Commodores

from the album Midnight Magic
- B-side: "Thumpin' Music" (US); "Captain Quick Draw" (UK)
- Released: July 27, 1979
- Genre: Pop, country
- Length: 5:32 (album version); 3:57 (single edit)
- Label: Motown
- Songwriter: Lionel Richie
- Producers: James Anthony Carmichael, Commodores

Commodores singles chronology
"Flying High" (1978)	"Sail On" (1979)	"Still" (1979)

Music video
- "Sail On" on YouTube

"Sail On" is a Commodores song written by Lionel Richie from their 1979 album Midnight Magic. Released as the first of three singles from the album, it was produced by both Commodores and James Anthony Carmichael. The song reached the top ten on both the US and UK music charts that same year. "Sail On" got as high as #4 on the Billboard Hot 100 chart while it made it all the way to #1 on the Cash Box Top 100 singles chart. Richie later recorded the song with Tim McGraw for 2012's Tuskegee.

Cash Box described it as "a sparkling ballad." Billboard called it "a surprising country flavored ballad" and said that "the subdued backing featuring prominent guitar and keyboards and the slick country intonations to Lionel Richie's vocal carry the melody." Record World called it a "beautiful, country-colored ballad."

== Track listings ==
US 7" single

1. "Sail On" – 3:57
2. "Thumpin' Music" – 3:24

UK 7" single

1. "Sail On" – 3:57
2. "Captain Quick Draw" – 3:00

== Charts ==
=== Weekly charts ===
Chart (1979)	Peak position
Australia (Kent Music Report)	86
Belgium (Ultratop 50 Flanders)	14
Canada (RPM)	3
Netherlands (Dutch Top 40)	4
Netherlands (Single Top 100)	8
New Zealand (Recorded Music NZ)	6
Sweden (Sverigetopplistan)	19
UK Singles (Official Charts)	8
US Billboard Hot 100	4
US Cash Box Top 100	1
US Adult Contemporary (Billboard)	9
US Hot R&B/Hip-Hop Songs (Billboard)	8

=== Year-end charts ===
Chart (1979)	Position
Netherlands (Dutch Top 40)	38
US Billboard Hot 100	98
