= Still (Commodores song) =

Single by Commodores

from the album Midnight Magic
- B-side: "Such a Woman"
- Released: September 14, 1979 (US)
- Genre: Pop; soul; easy listening
- Length: 5:50; 3:45 (single edit)
- Label: Motown
- Songwriter: Lionel Richie
- Producers: James Anthony Carmichael, Commodores

Commodores singles chronology
"Sail On" (1979)	"Still" (1979)	"Wonderland" (1979)

"Still" is a 1979 song by the soul music group the Commodores. It was released as a single on Motown Records with "Such a Woman" as the B-side. The song appears on their 1979 hit album Midnight Magic. This was their last No. 1 hit in the United States.

Cash Box said it was a "tender, lilting ballad" with "a soft, building piano figure" and "expressive, plaintive lead vocal." Billboard praised the " poignant lyric and slow, romantic melodyline." Record World said that "The fragile piano and sensitive vocal ballad make an impact with a simple arrangement that bursts into a horn/string melodrama."

== Charts ==
=== Weekly charts ===
Chart (1979–1980)	Peak position
Australia (Kent Music Report)	38
Canada RPM Adult Contemporary	15
Canada RPM Top Singles	2
Ireland (IRMA)	3
New Zealand (RIANZ)	13
UK Singles Chart	4
US Billboard Hot 100	1
US Billboard Adult Contemporary	6
US Billboard R&B Singles	1
US Cash Box Top 100	1

=== Year-end charts ===
Chart (1979)	Rank
US Cash Box Top 100	55

Chart (1980)	Rank
Canada	77
US Billboard Hot 100	23

=== All-time charts ===
Chart (1958–2018)	Position
US Billboard Hot 100	322

== Cover versions ==
In 1981, actor-singer John Schneider took a cover version to No. 69 on the pop chart. It was the B-side to his country single "Them Good Ol' Boys Are Bad", which reached No. 13 on the country chart.

In 1991, UK artist Shirley Bassey covered this song on her album titled, "Keep The Music Playing". This album was a hit both in the United Kingdom and New Zealand. Shirley included this song in her worldwide concert line-up throughout the 1990s.

The song was covered in a Cantonese version by Hong Kong singer Alan Tam as "My Heart Is Only You" (我心只有您).
