= Brian Rawling =

British record producer and songwriter

- Born: 1958 (age 67–68); Bootle, Merseyside, England
- Origin: United Kingdom
- Genre: Pop
- Occupations: Record producer; Songwriter; Drummer
- Years active: 1980s–present
- Formerly of: 3D; The Groove Brothers; Keep It Dark

Brian Rawling (born June 1958) is a British record producer and songwriter from Bootle, Merseyside. He is the founder and managing director of the music production and publishing company Metrophonic.

== Career ==
=== Early performing career (1980s) ===
Rawling played drums in the Liverpool-based synth-pop band 3D (originally known as 3D (A Fish in Sea)), joining the band in August 1983 replacing Fred Palethorpe and releasing singles on RAK Records. Rawling later played drums and percussion for the band Keep It Dark.

=== Production (1990s–present) ===
By the 1990s, Rawling became a producer, founding the production company Metrophonic in Surrey. In 1998, he co-produced Cher's single "Believe" alongside Mark Taylor. For his work on the same-named album, Rawling won a Grammy Award for Best Dance Recording at the 42nd Annual Grammy Awards in 2000.

Rawling and his Metrophonic team also produced tracks and albums for other popular artists, including Tina Turner, Enrique Iglesias, and One Direction.

== Discography ==
=== As performer / band member ===
==== Singles ====
| Year | Artist | Single Title | Label & Catalog | Format |
|---|---|---|---|---|
| 1984 | 3D | "Break The Fix(Ation)" | RAK Records (RAK 374) | 7", 12" |
| 1984 | 3D | "Nearer" | RAK Records (RAK 377) | 7" |
| 1985 | 3D | "Dance to Believe" | RAK Records (RAK 382) | 7", 12" |

==== Albums ====
| Year | Artist | Album Title | Label & Catalog | Role |
|---|---|---|---|---|
| 1986 | Keep It Dark | 1st Down & Ten | Elektra / Asylum Records (207 700-620) | Drums, percussion, vocals |

=== Selected production credits ===
| Year | Artist | Release | Role / Notes |
|---|---|---|---|
| 1997 | Pandora | This Could Be Heaven | Producer |
| 1998 | Cher | Believe | Producer |
| 1999 | Tina Turner | Twenty Four Seven | Producer ("When the Heartache Is Over") |
| 1999 | Enrique Iglesias | Enrique | Producer ("Rhythm Divine", "Be with You", "I Have Always Loved You", "Bailamos") |
| 2000 | Lara Fabian | Lara Fabian | Producer |
| 2000 | Mónica Naranjo | Minage | Producer |
| 2000 | Lionel Richie | Renaissance | Producer ("Tender Heart", "Here Is My Heart", "Don't Stop the Music") |
| 2001 | Rod Stewart | Human | Producer ("Run Back into Your Arms") |
| 2001 | Kaci Battaglia | Paradise (remix) | Producer |
| 2002 | Marta Sánchez | Soy Yo | Producer |
| 2002 | David Bowie | Heathen | Co-producer ("Everyone Says 'Hi'") |
| 2003 | Girls Aloud | Sound of the Underground | Producer ("Forever and a Night") |
| 2005 | Jo O'Meara | Relentless | Producer |
| 2005 | Sergey Lazarev | Don't Be Fake | Producer ("I'm Gone") |
| 2006 | The Corrs | Dreams: The Ultimate Corrs Collection | Producer |
| 2008 | Craig David | Greatest Hits | Producer ("Just My Imagination") |
| 2009 | Mica Paris | Born Again | Producer |
| 2011 | One Direction | Up All Night | Producer ("More than This", "Stole My Heart") |
| 2012 | Ronan Keating | Fires | Producer ("Lullaby", "NYC Girl", "The One You Love") |
| 2013 | Boyzone | BZ20 | Producer |
| 2015 | Blue | Colours | Producer (except "Nothing like You", "Special" and "Endless Love") |
| 2015 | Anggun | Toujours un ailleurs | Producer |
| 2019 | Emma Bunton | My Happy Place | Producer |
