= Don't Stop the Music (Lionel Richie song) =

2001 song by Lionel Richie

Single by Lionel Richie

from the album Renaissance
- Released: 2000
- Genre: Pop; dance-pop; disco
- Length: 4:13
- Label: Island Def Jam
- Songwriters: Lionel Richie; Paul Barry; Mark Taylor
- Producers: Brian Rawling; Mark Taylor

Lionel Richie singles chronology
"Angel" (2000)	"Don't Stop the Music" (2000)	"Tender Heart" (2001)

"Don't Stop the Music" is a song by the American singer Lionel Richie. It was written by Richie, Paul Barry and Mark Taylor for his sixth studio album, Renaissance (2000), and produced by Brian Rawling and Taylor. The song was released as the album's second single in late 2000 by Island Def Jam.

== Track listing ==
CD Maxi Single

1. "Don't Stop the Music" (Album Version) - 4:13
2. "Don't Stop the Music" (Joey Negro Revival Mix Radio Edit) - 3:38
3. "Shout It To The World" - 4:37
4. "All Night Long" (Live from Edinburgh Castle) - 5:26

UK CD Single

1. "Don't Stop the Music" (Radio Edit) - 3:38
2. "Dancing On The Ceiling" (Live) - 4:30
3. "Angel" (Boogieman Remix Radio Edit) - 4:02

CD Single Promo LRCDP4

1. "Don't Stop The Music" (The Joey Negro Revival Mix Radio Edit) - 3:38
2. "Don't Stop The Music" (The Joey Negro Rodox Dub) - 6:17
3. "Don't Stop The Music" (Original Version Radio Edit) - 3:36

== Charts ==
Chart (2001)	Peak position
Austria (Ö3 Austria Top 40)	74
Netherlands (Single Top 100)	73
Germany (GfK)	68
Italy (FIMI)	19
Switzerland (Schweizer Hitparade)	36
UK Singles (OCC)	34
