= Gotta Be You (3T song) =

Single by 3T

from the album Brotherhood
- Released: March 12, 1996
- Recorded: 1995
- Genre: Pop, R&B, new jack swing
- Length: 3:34
- Label: Epic/MJJ Music
- Songwriters: Max Martin, Herbert Crichlow, Denniz PoP
- Producers: Max Martin, Denniz PoP

3T singles chronology
"I Need You" (1996)	"Gotta Be You" (1996)	"Stuck on You" (2003)

Music video
- 3T, Herbie – "Gotta Be You" on YouTube

"Gotta Be You" is a song by American pop group 3T. It was written by Max Martin, Herbert Crichlow and Denniz PoP. It was released in 1995 only in Europe. The album version features English producer Herbie (though he is not officially credited on the single) and is from the album Brotherhood.

== Track listings ==
=== CD single ===
1. New Radio Edit (3:34)
2. Eurodance Dream Mix Radio Edit (3:40)

=== Limited edition CD single ===
1. Radio Edit (3:34)
2. Eurodance Dream Mix (4:28)
3. Black Radio Mix (3:55)
4. Anything (3T & D.T. Mix) (4:49)

=== Maxi CD ===
1. New Radio Edit (3:34)
2. Eurodance Dream Mix (4:28)
3. Maurice Joshua Remix (4:28)
4. Extended Mix (5:31)

== Charts ==
Chart performance for "Gotta Be You"
Chart (1997)	Peak position
Australia (ARIA)	61
Belgium (Ultratip Bubbling Under Flanders)	6
Belgium (Ultratop 50 Wallonia)	40
Estonia Airplay (Eesti Top 25)	19
Europe (Eurochart Hot 100)	32
Europe (European Hit Radio)	32
France (SNEP)	16
France Airplay (SNEP)	15
Germany (GfK)	84
Netherlands (Dutch Top 40)	24
Netherlands (Single Top 100)	33
Spain Airplay (Top 40 Radio)	30
UK Singles (Official Charts)	10
UK Airplay (Music Week)	34
