= Tito Time =

Studio album by Tito Jackson
- Released: December 21, 2016
- Genre: R&B; jazz
- Length: 53:01
- Label: Play It Right Music

Singles from Tito Time
- 1. "Get It Baby" Released: 2016; 2. "When the Magic Happens" Released: 2017; 3. "One Way Street" Released: 2017; 4. "We Made It" Released: 2018

Tito Time is the first solo studio album by American singer Tito Jackson. It was released on December 21, 2016, by Play It Right Music.

== Background ==
The album is the first solo album by Tito Jackson decades after being a founding member of the Jackson 5.

== Track listing ==
Tito Time track listing
No.	Title	Writer(s)	Producer(s)	Length
1.	"Get It Baby" (featuring Big Daddy Kane)	Tito Jackson; Sylvester "Earl" Powell; Jeff "Tight" Roberson; Michael K. Jackson; Byron Dorris; Antonio Hardy	Earl Powell; Jeff "Tight" Roberson; Michael K. Jackson; Byron Dorris	2:57
2.	"When the Magic Happens" (featuring Jocelyn Brown)	Tito Jackson; Sylvester "Earl" Powell; Jeff "Tight" Roberson; Michael K. Jackson	Earl Powell; Jeff "Tight" Roberson; Michael K. Jackson	3:38
3.	"Put It on Me"	Tito Jackson; Sylvester "Earl" Powell; Jeff "Tight" Roberson; Michael K. Jackson	Earl Powell; Jeff "Tight" Roberson; Michael K. Jackson	3:10
4.	"We Made It"	Ryan Pate; Gabriel Ollie; TJ Jackson	Ryan Pate; Ollie Gabriel; Taryll Jackson; TJ Jackson	3:56
5.	"One Way Street"	Tito Jackson; Sylvester "Earl" Powell; Jeff "Tight" Roberson; Michael K. Jackson; Terrance "Slim" Holmes	Earl Powell; Jeff "Tight" Roberson; Michael K. Jackson	3:42
6.	"So Far So Good"	Taryll Jackson; TJ Jackson	Taryll Jackson; TJ Jackson	3:35
7.	"On My Way Home"	Tito Jackson; Sylvester "Earl" Powell; Jeff "Tight" Roberson; Michael K. Jackson; Terrance "Slim" Holmes; Isaiah Sharkey	Earl Powell; Jeff "Tight" Roberson; Michael K. Jackson	3:05
8.	"Jammer Street" (featuring 3T)	Taryll Jackson; TJ Jackson	Taj Jackson; Taryll Jackson; TJ Jackson	2:55
9.	"She's Gotta Go"	Ryan Pate; Gabriel Ollie	Ryan Pate; Gabriel Ollie	3:40
10.	"Not Afraid"	Tito Jackson; Sylvester "Earl" Powell; Jeff "Tight" Roberson; Michael K. Jackson; Terrance "Slim" Holmes; Isaiah Sharkey	Earl Powell; Jeff "Tight" Roberson; Michael K. Jackson	4:17
11.	"Cruisin'" (featuring Betty Wright)	TJ Jackson; Ryan Pate; Gabriel Ollie	Ryan Pate; Gabriel Ollie; TJ Jackson	3:55
12.	"T.I.T.O Love"	Tito Jackson; Sylvester "Earl" Powell; Jeff "Tight" Roberson; Michael K. Jackson; Terrance "Slim" Holmes	Earl Powell; Jeff "Tight" Roberson; Michael K. Jackson	2:42
13.	"I Ain't Going Nowhere"	Taryll Jackson; TJ Jackson	Taryll Jackson; TJ Jackson	3:59
14.	"Home Is Where the Heart Is"	Tito Jackson; Ryan Pate; Gabriel Ollie; TJ Jackson	Ryan Pate; Ollie Gabriel; TJ Jackson	4:50
15.	"Get It Baby" (no rap version; bonus track)	Tito Jackson; Sylvester "Earl" Powell; Jeff "Tight" Roberson; Michael K. Jackson; Byron Dorris	Earl Powell; Jeff "Tight" Roberson; Michael K. Jackson; Byron Dorris	2:40
Total length:				53:01

== Personnel ==
Credits adapted from AllMusic.

- Tito Jackson – vocals, composer, songwriter

== Release history ==
Release history and formats for Tito Time
Country	Date	Format(s)	Label
Japan	December 21, 2016	CD; digital download	Play It Right Music
United States	January 20, 2017	CD; digital download	Play It Right Music
