= The Jacksons: Next Generation =

- Starring: 3T
- Theme music composer: 3T
- Country of origin: United States
- No. of seasons: 1
- No. of episodes: 6

Production
- Running time: 60 minutes

Original release
- Network: Lifetime
- Release: October 2 – November 6, 2015

The Jacksons: Next Generation is an American reality television series which stars members of the group 3T, and other members of the Jackson family. It aired on Lifetime between October 2, and November 6, 2015.

== Background ==
Performing since the 1980s, the sons of Tito Jackson, Taj, Taryll and TJ, known as the music group 3T had success in the 1990s, selling more than three million copies of their debut album, Brotherhood, and touring in Europe in early 1997.

On August 3, 2015, Lifetime announced that they ordered a docuseries which would follow the three brothers as they work to jumpstart their career, plan to record a new album. They are portrayed "as traditional family men while living up to the pressures and demands that comes with their last name 'facing constant rumours, stalkers and frauds who all want a piece of anything and anyone related to the family's legacy.'" Talking to journalist Paulette Cohn, TJ Jackson said "For me, it's about showing who we are as a family, and going beyond the brand 'Jackson,' and showing that there's real people behind that brand. Taryll Jackson said, "It's also finding a way for us to do something, where the focus is not just us, but what it is we're doing. "If we're creating an album, how do we make it about the music and not about Michael Jackson's nephews?"

Taj Jackson wanted to use the series to counter rumors and misconceptions about his family. "We are a private family but at the same time, with social media, if you don't address certain things, people think it's true and people keep spreading those lies and rumors. I've seen people quote stuff on message boards that are completely false... then someone else picks it up and starts quoting it, and it's kind of one of those things where we have to just nip it in the bud." Reportedly, two of Michael's children asked to be in the show after their cousin TJ pulled them aside and told them what they were planning to do.

== Synopsis ==
Still affected by the loss of their mother Dee Dee, and the death of their uncle Michael, the brothers live their day-to-day life with their children. The good and the bad of living with a world-famous name often gets in the way of their quest to find normalcy. TJ faces additional challenges as the co-legal guardian of Prince, Paris, and Blanket, Michael's three children and the brothers' cousins.

== Reception ==
Reviews in The New York Times and Variety were mixed. Variety was more cynical regarding the motives behind the series. Jon Caramanica wrote that the brothers seemed vulnerable and didn't play for the cameras... that "lack of artifice is built into the show itself". According to critic Brian Lowry "it was hard to imagine a more glaring demonstration of irony and hypocrisy than this series. He said the brothers were using the show to plot a comeback and secure another 15 minutes of fame.

Movie and television critic Melissa Camacho called the series a "somewhat bland celebreality series which doesn't offer anything beyond its standard reality contemporaries" but lauded it for its positive message about the importance of family.

== Episodes ==
No.	Title	Original release date
1	"Ordinary Family, Extraordinary Name"	October 2, 2015
Being a part of the legendary Jackson family is a blessing...and a curse. Tito's sons, Taj, Taryll and TJ Jackson, struggle to manage their day-to-day lives, careers and families under the constant spotlight of their famous last name. Now, they are ready to tell their side of the story of what it really means to be a Jackson.
2	"Back to the Future"	October 9, 2015
With the help of childhood friend Kim Kardashian, Taj, Taryll and TJ are reunited with their long-lost family heirlooms. After a trip down memory lane, the brothers renew an old-time family tradition and plan a camping trip for all of the Jackson cousins. However, with all their other commitments, they are unsure if they can pull it together. Meanwhile, TJ and Frances are celebrating their anniversary and he's pulling out all the stops while Taryll's relationship with Bre is tearing at the seams.
3	"Full of Surprises"	October 16, 2015
The family tries to have a woman, Tanay Jackson, get a DNA test. They claim she is their sister.
4	"The Mother of All Confrontations"	October 23, 2015
Taryll, Taj and TJ are finally ready to come to terms with their mother's death and travel to Las Vegas to record a song with their father, Tito.
5	"Now or Never"	October 30, 2015
Taryll, Taj and TJ are still suffering the stress of their uncle Michael's death and don't have enough time to rehearse for a concert in Holland.
6	"The Price of Fame"	November 6, 2015
Tensions are mounting as TJ and Taryll are deciding the fate of their relationships with their loved ones.
