= I Need You (Eric Carmen song) =

Song written by Eric Carmen

Single by Euclid Beach Band

from the album Euclid Beach Band
- B-side: "Hard to Say Goodbye"
- Released: March 1979
- Genre: Soft rock
- Length: 3:30
- Label: Epic
- Songwriter: Eric Carmen
- Producer: Eric Carmen

Euclid Beach Band singles chronology
"There's No Surf in Cleveland" (1978)	"I Need You" (1979)	"Headlands" (1982)

"I Need You" is a song written by Eric Carmen. Versions by Euclid Beach Band (1979) and then 3T (1996) were released as singles.

== Early versions ==
"I Need You" was originally recorded in 1977 by Frankie Valli on his album Lady Put the Light Out. Euclid Beach Band released their version as a single in 1979 which reached No. 81 on the U.S. Billboard Hot 100. Carmen provided keyboard and production work on the song. The lead vocalist is Peter Hewlett.

== 3T version ==
"I Need You"

Single by 3T

from the album Brotherhood
- B-side: "Brotherhood" (single edit); "Anything" (acoustic version)
- Released: February 20, 1996
- Recorded: 1995
- Studio: Cheiron (Stockholm); Titan (Los Angeles)
- Genre: Pop; R&B; gospel
- Length: 3:55
- Label: Epic; MJJ Music
- Songwriter: Eric Carmen
- Producers: Max Martin; Denniz PoP

3T singles chronology
"Why" (1996)	"I Need You" (1996)	"Gotta Be You" (1996)

Music video
- "I Need You" on YouTube

The song was covered by American R&B group 3T in 1996, released as the fifth single from their debut album, Brotherhood (1995). It was a success on the European charts, but was never released in the US. Michael Jackson, their uncle, provides background vocals.

=== Critical reception ===
A reviewer from Music Week gave the song a score of four out of five, adding, "Uncle Michael provides backing vocals on this ballad which sends 3T harmonising down the schmaltz road via an arrangement oddly reminiscent of East 17's 'Stay Another Day'."

=== Track listings ===
- CD single
1. "I Need You" (album version) – 3:55
2. "Brotherhood" (single edit) – 3:16
- CD maxi
1. "I Need You" (Christmas mix) – 4:13
2. "I Need You" (singalong version) – 3:55
3. "Anything" (acoustic version) – 4:02
- CD maxi (2)
1. "I Need You" (album version) – 3:55
2. "I Need You" (Linslee Campbell remix) – 5:27
3. "I Need You" (Linsee Campbell Breakdown remix) – 5:27
4. "Brotherhood" (single edit) – 3:16

=== Charts and certifications ===
==== Weekly charts ====
Chart (1996–1997)	Peak position
Australia (ARIA)	17
Belgium (Ultratop 50 Flanders)	9
Belgium (Ultratop 50 Wallonia)	8
Czech Republic (IFPI CR)	8
Estonia Airplay (Eesti Top 25)	5
Europe (Eurochart Hot 100)	13
Europe (European Dance Radio)	8
Europe (European Hit Radio)	22
Europe (Atlantic Crossovers)	21
France (SNEP)	5
France Airplay (SNEP)	18
Germany (GfK)	22
Ireland (IRMA)	14
Netherlands (Dutch Top 40)	5
Netherlands (Single Top 100)	5
New Zealand (Recorded Music NZ)	30
Scotland (OCC)	4
Sweden (Sverigetopplistan)	42
Switzerland (Schweizer Hitparade)	9
UK Singles (OCC)	3
UK Airplay (Music Week)	21

==== Year-end charts ====
Chart (1996)	Position
UK Singles (OCC)	77

Chart (1997)	Position
Australia (ARIA)	69
Belgium (Ultratop Flanders)	52
Belgium (Ultratop Wallonia)	47
Europe (Eurochart Hot 100)	43
France (SNEP)	37
Netherlands (Dutch Top 40)	91
Netherlands (Single Top 100)	97
Switzerland (Schweizer Hitparade)	36

==== Certifications ====
Region	Certification	Certified units/sales
Australia (ARIA)	Gold	35,000^{^}
Belgium (BRMA)	Gold	25,000^{*}
France (SNEP)	Gold	250,000^{*}
United Kingdom (BPI)	Silver	200,000^{^}
^{*} Sales figures based on certification alone.^{^} Shipments figures based on certification alone.

== Disco Stewie Harrison version ==
"I Need You"

Single by Disco Stewie Harrison featuring Roma W.
- Released: 2005
- Genre: Dance
- Length: 3:32
- Label: Disco Stewie Harrison
- Songwriter: Eric Carmen

The song was covered by Australian dance group Disco Stewie Harrison, featuring Roma Waterman in 2005. The song peaked at number 21 on the Australian charts.

=== Track listing ===
1. "I Need You" (dance mix) – 3:32
2. "I Need You" (Love mix) – 3:30

=== Charts ===
Chart (2006)	Peak position
Australia (ARIA)	21
