= AzMarie Livingston =

American actress (born 1986)

- Born: Ashley Marie Livingston; December 28, 1986 (age 39); San Fernando Valley, California, U.S.
- Years active: 2008–present
- Height: 5 ft 10 in (1.78 m)

Ashley Marie "AzMarie" Livingston (born December 28, 1986) is an American fashion model, actress, singer and DJ who rose to fame after appearing on America's Next Top Model: British Invasion in 2012. Livingston was cast to play the role of Chicken on the Fox show Empire.

== Early life ==
Livingston was born Ashley Marie Livingston in California's San Fernando Valley and raised in Milwaukee, Wisconsin. According to Livingston, the name "AzMarie" is an amalgam of her first and middle names. Livingston was raised primarily by her single mother. Her father is gay, and Livingston describes the relationship between her parents as them being "best friends". She came out to him first as a lesbian, with her father being immediately accepting because of his own orientation; her mother taking more time, with initial disappointment. Now her mother is a strong supporter of her career. Livingston says she was bullied growing up over her androgyny. As a child, she moved to the Milwaukee, Wisconsin area, where she later attended Nicolet High School. At age 9, Livingston became interested in modeling after traveling with her father on vacation to Los Angeles, California, but according to Livingston, "I took a break when I was younger because it didn't pick up as much. I wanted to have a childhood." After graduating high school, Livingston attended the University of Wisconsin-Whitewater before dropping out after three semesters and moving to Los Angeles to further her career. She is primarily of African-American ancestry, but also partial German and Indian descent.

== Career ==
=== Modeling ===
Livingston began her career as a runway model in Los Angeles and New York City. From 2009 to 2011, she appeared in various magazines and participated in several fashion shows, including London Fashion Week and BET's Rip the Runway.

==== America's Next Top Model ====
In 2012, Livingston first came into the public eye as a participant in The CW program America's Next Top Model: British Invasion. She was noted for her tattoos and androgynous look. Despite her initial strength in the competition, including two first callouts, Livingston was eliminated in the sixth episode. She became the sixth eliminated overall in her first-ever bottom two appearance which Kyle Gober survived.

=== Acting ===
Livingston portrayed Hakeem's best friend Chicken on Fox's Empire. In 2009, Livingston appeared in the award-winning film Precious. In 2010, she went on to appear on the television shows The Real Housewives of New York City and The Jacksons: A Family Dynasty. After her stint on Top Model, Livingston acquired a role on the gay television series, DTLA, which aired on OUTtv and Logo. Working alongside actresses Melanie Griffith and Sandra Bernhard, Livingston played the role of Ricki, who is Griffith's girlfriend on the show. Of her breakthrough role, Livingston said, "Being a rookie with all-stars made me a little nervous, but I don't think I showed it." Livingston starred in a leading role in the romantic comedy Almost Amazing by director Justin Price (The Cloth).

=== Music ===
Livingston started out as an extra in several music videos prior to her solo career as well as before competing on America's Next Top Model, including Kelly Rowland's "Motivation" and Nicki Minaj's "Moment 4 Life". Her debut single "Morning Guarantee" was released in December 2012. On August 31, 2014, Livingston released her debut EP on SoundCloud titled HipPopMelodicPoetry. Her single "We Hot" was released in 2015.

== Filmography ==
=== Film ===
Year	Title	Role	Notes
2009	Precious	Girl with Jermaine	
2024	Goon Squad	Vangie	

=== Television ===
Year	Title	Role	Notes
2010	The Real Housewives of New York City	Herself	
2010	The Jacksons: A Family Dynasty	Herself	
2012	America's Next Top Model: British Invasion	Herself	
2012	DTLA	Ricki	
2015	Empire	Chicken	
2015	Grey's Anatomy	Intern	
2018	The Purge	Bracka	
2025	The Family Business: New Orleans	Kendal	

== Discography ==
=== Extended plays ===
- HipPopMelodicPoetry (2014)

=== Singles ===
- 2012: "Morning Guarantee"
- 2015: "We Hot"
