= Rob Mounsey =

American musician (born 1952)

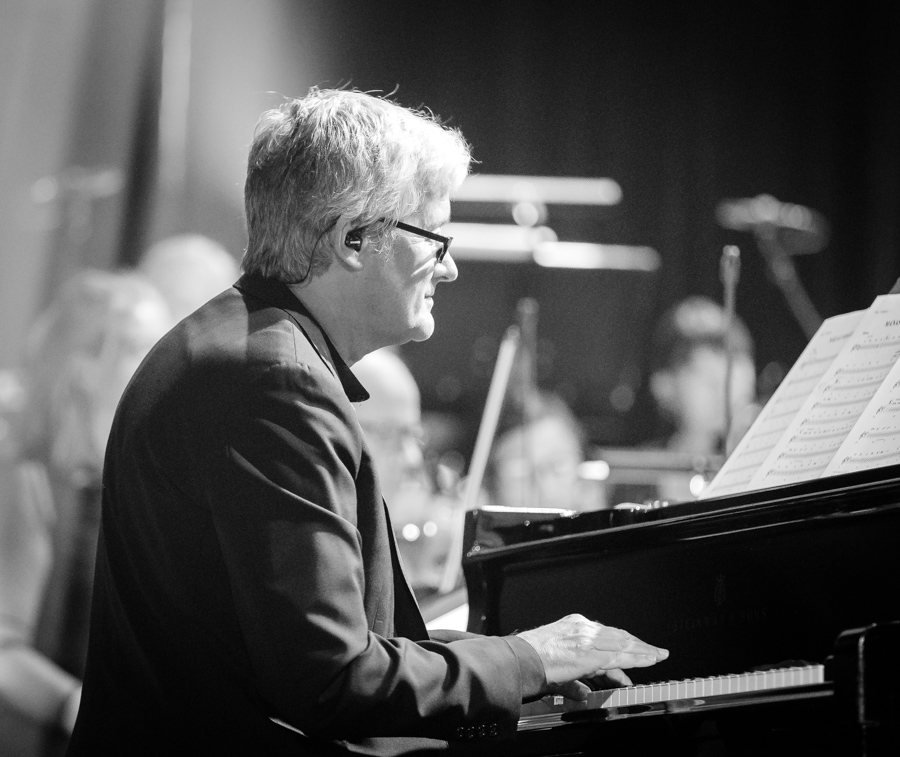
- Rob Mounsey performing in Oslo in 2018

Background information
- Born: December 2, 1952 (age 73); Berea, Ohio, U.S.
- Genres: Pop, rock, R&B, jazz
- Occupations: Musician, composer, arranger, producer
- Instrument: Keyboards
- Years active: 1976 – present
- Website: robmounsey.com

Rob Mounsey (born December 2, 1952) is an American musician, composer, and arranger.

== Music career ==
Mounsey was born in Berea, Ohio, and grew up in Seattle, Washington, spending a few years each in Findlay and Granville, Ohio. At the age of 17, he was awarded a 1970 BMI Student Composer Award for his orchestral work Ilium, New York, Is Divided into Three Parts. He attended Berklee College of Music in Boston from 1971 to 1975.

In 1976, he moved to New York City to become a studio musician, arranger, and producer for a wide range of well-known artists, including Aaron Neville, Aztec Camera, Brian Wilson, Carly Simon, Chaka Khan, Chromeo, Brett Eldredge, Diana Krall, Diana Ross, Donald Fagen, Eric Clapton, James Taylor, Karen Carpenter, Madonna, Michael Franks, Natalie Cole, Paul Simon, Rihanna, Steely Dan, and others. He performed on keyboards in 1981 for Simon and Garfunkel's Concert in the Park.

In 1985, he played keyboards in a New-York-based group called Joe Cool with Will Lee, Jeff Mironov and Christopher Parker. They released one album, Party Animals, on the Pony Canyon label in Japan, followed by a Japanese tour.

Mounsey released three solo albums as a recording artist: Dig (Sona Gaia, 1990), and two self-released albums on his own Monkeyville label, Back in the Pool and Mango Theory.

He toured as musical director and pianist for Idina Menzel in her Pops Symphony tours (2010-2015,) for which he created nearly all of the arrangements.

He has composed for film and television, including the 1988 Mike Nichols film Working Girl (with Carly Simon), the film Bright Lights, Big City (with Donald Fagen) and the HBO hit series Sex and the City. Mounsey wrote two long-running Emmy-winning themes for the television show Guiding Light. He is a six-time Grammy Award nominee, and a winner of two Emmy Awards. He is a Zen Buddhist who resides in Brooklyn, New York.

== Selected discography ==
=== As leader ===
Year	Album	Artist/Group	Label	Refs
1985	Party Animals	with Joe Cool	Canyon	
1987	Local Color	with Steve Khan	Denon	
1989	Dig	with the Flying Monkey Orchestra	Sona Gaia	
1993	Back in the Pool	with the Flying Monkey Orchestra	Monkeyville	
1995	Mango Theory	with the Flying Monkey Orchestra	Monkeyville	
1998	You Are Here	with Steve Khan	Siam	

=== As producer ===
Year	Album	Artist	Label	Refs
1983	Passionfruit	Michael Franks	Warner Bros.	
1985	Skin Dive	Michael Franks	Warner Bros.	
1987	The Camera Never Lies	Michael Franks	Warner Bros.	
1987	Love	Aztec Camera	WEA	
1989	There Were Signs	Bill Gable	Private Music	
2003	Nature Boy	Aaron Neville	Verve	
2007	Destination Moon	Deborah Cox	Universal	
2011	Barefoot at the Symphony	Idina Menzel	Concord	
2014	Billy's Back on Broadway	Billy Porter	Concord	
2016	Glow	Brett Eldredge		

=== As arranger/pianist ===
Year	Album	Artist	Label	Refs
1977	Cissy Houston	Cissy Houston	Private Stock	
1977	Blue Lights in the Basement	Roberta Flack	Atlantic	
1977	Say It in Private	Steve Goodman	Asylum	
1977	The Player Not the Game	Jess Roden	Island	
1978	Think It Over	Cissy Houston	Private Stock	
1978	Roberta Flack	Roberta Flack	Atlantic	
1978	Spinozza	David Spinozza	A&M	
1978	One-Eyed Jack	Garland Jeffreys	A&M	
1978	Burnin'	Carol Douglas	Midsong	
1978	Desire Wire	Cindy Bullens	United Artists	
1978	All Things Beautiful	Jimmy Ponder	Lester Radio	
1978	Let's All Chant	Michael Zager	Private Stock	
1979	Step Aside for a Lady	Cissy Houston	Columbia	
1979	Fate for Breakfast	Art Garfunkel	CBS	
1979	Arrows	Steve Khan	Columbia	
1979	Stay Free	Ashford & Simpson	Warner Bros.	
1979	Browne Sugar	Tom Browne	Arista/GRP	
1979	Two Sides to Every Woman	Carlene Carter	Warner Bros.	
1979	If the Shoe Fits	Ronnie Dyson	Columbia	
1979	Euclid Beach Band	Euclid Beach Band	Epic/Cleveland	
1979	Bottom Line	John Mayall	DJM	
1979	Dancin' and Lovin'	The Spinners	Atlantic	
1979	Life's a Party	Michael Zager	Private Stock	
1980	Gaucho	Steely Dan	MCA	
1980	Carnaval	Spyro Gyra	MCA	
1980	A Musical Affair	Ashford & Simpson	Warner Bros.	
1980	About Love	Gladys Knight	Columbia	
1980	The Best Side of Goodbye	Jane Olivor	Columbia	
1980	TP	Teddy Pendergrass	Philadelphia International	
1980	Impressions of Virus	Teo Macero Presents	Denon	
1980	Beats Workin'	Jimmy Maelen	Pavilion	
1981	Scissors Cut	Art Garfunkel	Columbia	
1981	Freetime	Spyro Gyra	MCA	
1981	Why Do Fools Fall in Love	Diana Ross	Capitol/EMI	
1981	Touch	Gladys Knight	Columbia	
1981	Pirates	Rickie Lee Jones	Warner Bros.	
1981	Labor of Love	The Spinners	Atlantic	
1982	The Nightfly	Donald Fagen	Warner Bros.	
1982	Objects of Desire	Michael Franks	Warner Bros.	
1982	Incognito	Spyro Gyra	MCA	
1982	Silk Electric	Diana Ross	Capitol	
1982	The Nylon Curtain	Billy Joel	Columbia	
1982	The Concert in Central Park	Simon & Garfunkel	Warner Bros.	
1983	Hearts and Bones	Paul Simon	Warner Bros.	
1983	Passionfruit	Michael Franks	Warner Bros.	
1983	Hello Big Man	Carly Simon	Warner Bros.	
1983	Ross	Diana Ross	RCA	
1983	Rhythm Hymn	Jaki Whitren	Elektra	
1984	I Feel for You	Chaka Khan	Warner Bros.	
1984	Civilized Man	Joe Cocker	Capitol	
1984	Against All Odds (Take a Look at Me Now)	Phil Collins	Atlantic	
1984	In the Evening	Sheryl Lee Ralph	New York Music	
1985	Skin Dive	Michael Franks	Warner Bros.	
1985	20/20	George Benson	Warner Bros.	
1985	Wanna Play Your Game!	Joyce Kennedy	A&M	
1985	Surprize	Ralph MacDonald	Polydor	
1986	Graceland	Paul Simon	Warner Bros.	
1986	The Animals' Christmas by Jimmy Webb	Art Garfunkel	CBS	
1986	Good Time for Love	Sadao Watanabe	Elektra	
1986	Back in the High Life	Steve Winwood	Island	
1986	The Bridge	Billy Joel	Columbia	
1987	The Camera Never Lies	Michael Franks	Warner Bros.	
1987	One from the Heart	Jocelyn Brown	Warner Bros.	
1987	Jude Cole	Jude Cole	Warner Bros.	
1987	Love	Aztec Camera	WEA	
1987	The Hunger	Michael Bolton	Columbia	
1987	Jill Jones	Jill Jones	Paisley Park	
1987	Voices	Karen Kamon	Atco	
1987	Coming Around Again	Carly Simon	Arista	
1988	CK	Chaka Khan	Warner Bros.	
1988	Brian Wilson	Brian Wilson	Sire/Reprise	
1989	Journeyman	Eric Clapton	Reprise	
1989	Blackwood	Eddie Daniels	GRP	
1989	Lovelines	The Carpenters	A&M	
1989	Something Real	Phoebe Snow	Elektra	
1990	Sings Cole Porter	Dionne Warwick	Arista	
1991	Days Like These	Jay Hoggard	GRP	
1993	Earth Step	Sadao Watanabe	Verve Forecast	
1994	Oh!	Will Lee	Go Jazz	
1995	The Finer Things	Steve Winwood	Island	
1996	Karen Carpenter	Karen Carpenter	A&M	
1996	Stardust	Natalie Cole	Elektra	
1997	Hourglass	James Taylor	Columbia	
1997	Still Waters	Bee Gees	Polydor	
1997	Dans Ma Chair	Patricia Kaas	Columbia	
1997	Nascimento	Milton Nascimento	Warner Bros.	
1998	Painted from Memory	Elvis Costello	Mercury	
1998	Port Pleasure	Ralph MacDonald	Videoarts	
1999	Aida	Elton John	Rocket/Island	
1999	Lifetime Guarantee	Michael Johnson	Magic	
1999	Songs from the Last Century	George Michael	Virgin/Aegean	
2001	This Is the Moment	Donny Osmond	Decca	
2002	October Road	James Taylor	Columbia	
2002	Ask a Woman Who Knows	Natalie Cole	Verve	
2002	Live in Paris	Diana Krall	Verve	
2002	This Is Who I Am	Heather Headley	RCA/BMG	
2002	Smile Songs from the Movies	Lyle Lovett	Curb/MCA	
2002	It Had to Be You: The Great American Songbook	Rod Stewart	J/BMG	
2002	The Season for Romance	Lee Ann Womack	MCA Nashville	
2003	Nature Boy: The Standards Album	Aaron Neville	Verve	
2003	As Time Goes By: The Great American Songbook Vol. II	Rod Stewart	J/BMG	
2003	Soulful	Ruben Studdard	J/19 Recordings	
2004	Taking a Chance on Love	Jane Monheit	Sony Classical	
2005	It's Time	Michael Bublé	143/Reprise	
2005	Last Quarter Moon	Chiara Civello	Verve Forecast	
2006	James Taylor at Christmas	James Taylor	Columbia	
2006	Real Street	Mark Sholtez	Universal/Verve	
2007	Borrowed Time	Steve Khan	Tone Center	
2007	Destination Moon	Deborah Cox	Decca	
2007	At the Movies	Dave Koz	Capitol	
2011	Parting Shot	Steve Khan	Tone Center	
2012	Live Barefoot at the Symphony	Idina Menzel	Concord	
2012	Dinosaurs Are Coming Back Again	Valerie Simpson	Hopsack & Silk	
2014	Subtext	Steve Khan	ESC	
2014	Christmas in New York	Renee Fleming	Decca	
2015	Before This World	James Taylor	Concord	
2016	Backlog	Steve Khan	ESC	
2017	La Même Tribu	Eddy Mitchell	Polydor	
2018	La Même Tribu Volume 2	Eddy Mitchell	Polydor	
