= DTLA =

DTLA may refer to:

- Downtown Los Angeles, the central business district of Los Angeles, United States
- DTLA (TV series), 2012 gay television series
- Digital Transmission Content Protection, a Digital Transmission Licensing Administrator
- Đồng Tâm Long An F.C., (DTLA FC), Vietnamese football club based in Tân An
