= The Jacksons: An American Dream =

1992 miniseries directed by Karen Arthur

- DVD cover
- Written by: Joyce Eliason
- Directed by: Karen Arthur
- Starring: Lawrence Hilton Jacobs; Angela Bassett; Holly Robinson Peete; Margaret Avery; Alex Burrall; Jermaine Jackson Jr. Bumper Robinson; Floyd Meyers Jr. Monica Calhoun; Jason Weaver; Angel Vargas; Terrence Howard; Vanessa Williams; Billy Dee Williams; Wylie Draper; Colin Steele
- Theme music composer: Harold Wheeler
- Country of origin: United States
- Original language: English
- No. of episodes: 2

Production
- Producers: Suzanne de Passe; Joyce Eliason; Jermaine Jackson; Margaret Maldonado; Stan Margulies
- Running time: 300 min.
- Production companies: Motown Productions; KJS Films; PolyGram Filmed Entertainment de Passe Entertainment; Stan Margulies Productions

Original release
- Network: ABC
- Release: November 15 – November 18, 1992

The Jacksons: An American Dream is an American five-hour miniseries broadcast in two halves on ABC and originally broadcast on November 15 through November 18, 1992. It spans five decades, beginning with the rise of the Jackson family, one of the most successful musical families in show business, from a midwestern steel town to the early and successful years of the popular Motown group the Jackson 5.

The miniseries was executive produced by Suzanne de Passe and Stan Margulies, produced by Joyce Eliason, Jermaine Jackson and Margaret Maldonado, and directed by Karen Arthur. The movie was filmed in Los Angeles and Pittsburgh, where director Arthur had previously filmed her feature film Lady Beware. The miniseries features an all-star cast, including Lawrence Hilton Jacobs as the Jacksons' patriarch Joe Jackson, and Angela Bassett as the family matriarch Katherine Jackson; Abolade David Olatunde, Alex Burrall, Jason Weaver and the late Wylie Draper, who died the following year, played Michael Jackson in different eras, while Bumper Robinson and Terrence Howard played Jackie Jackson in different eras. Jermaine Jackson was portrayed by his son Jermaine Jackson Jr. and Colin Steele; Shakiem Jamar Evans and Angel Vargas played Tito Jackson; Floyd Myers Jr., Jacen Wilkerson, and Marcus Maurice played Marlon Jackson; Margaret Avery played Katherine's mother, Martha Scruse; Holly Robinson Peete played Diana Ross; Billy Dee Williams played Berry Gordy; and Vanessa Williams played de Passe.

The Jacksons: An American Dream is based on Katherine Jackson's My Family autobiography. A ratings success, the program won an Emmy Award for Outstanding Individual Achievement in Choreography, while the performances of Hilton Jacobs and Bassett received widespread acclaim.

== Plot ==
The opening sequence of the film features footage of the real Jacksons rehearsing and performing on stage, a few clips from the "Can You Feel It" music video, album covers, magazine covers, a snippet from their cartoon, and pictures of the family. The film is mostly based on the autobiography written by Katherine Jackson, and issued in 1990, entitled My Family. The entire mini-series spans a period of about 40 years.

Act 1 of the film is based on young Katherine Scruse and Joseph Jackson meeting and courting in the 1940s and showing how they managed to start out raising their children in Gary, Indiana in the 1950s and 1960s, how Joseph discovers the children have talent and starts entering them in talent shows, and finally how the Jackson 5 go on to have early fame and face its consequences in the late 1960s.

Act 2 of the film deals with the struggles of young Michael Jackson as he faces his brothers marrying early into the Jackson 5's success, his problems with acne as a teenager, and the group's eventual switch to Epic Records in the 1970s, his eventual solo superstardom based on the success of his albums Off the Wall and Thriller, the commercial mishap that caused his hair to ignite, and his legendary Motown 25 performance of "Billie Jean", as well as confronting his difficult relationship with his estranged father in the 1980s. Katherine confronts Joseph when she learns that he is seeing a woman who works for Joe's company. They later reconcile after Michael's burning accident. The series concludes with the 1984 Victory Tour.

Michael Jackson's voice is heard on: "Beat It", "Human Nature", "Billie Jean", "I Want You Back", "I Wanna Be Where You Are", "I'll Be There", "Rockin' Robin", "ABC", and "Dancing Machine". On all other songs, the Michael Jackson vocal part is performed by Anthony Harrell, Jason Weaver or Kipp Lennon.

== Cast ==
- Lawrence Hilton Jacobs as Joe Jackson
- Angela Bassett as Katherine Jackson
- Holly Robinson Peete as Diana Ross
- Margaret Avery as Martha Scruse
- Billy Dee Williams as Berry Gordy
- Vanessa Williams as Suzanne de Passe
- Wylie Draper as Michael Jackson (ages 17–26)
  - Abolade David Olatunde as Michael Jackson (baby)
  - Alex Burrall as Michael Jackson (ages 6–8)
  - Jason Weaver as Michael Jackson (ages 9–14)
- Colin Steele as Jermaine Jackson
  - Jermaine Jackson Jr. as Jermaine Jackson (ages 10–17)
- Terrence Howard as Jackie Jackson
  - Bumper Robinson as Jackie Jackson (ages 12–16)
- Monica Calhoun as Rebbie Jackson
- Ebonie Smith as La Toya Jackson
  - Kelli Martin as La Toya Jackson (ages 8–10)
- Angel Vargas as Tito Jackson
  - Shakiem Jamar Evans as Tito Jackson (ages 11–15)
- Maya Nicole Johnson as Janet Jackson
- Monica Allison as Hazel Gordy
- Robert Redcross as Randy Jackson
  - Nicolas Phillips as Randy Jackson (ages 7–9)
- Marcus Maurice as Marlon Jackson
  - Floyd Myers Jr. as Marlon Jackson (ages 7–9)
  - Jacen Wilkerson as Marlon Jackson (ages 10–15)
- Amanda Hall as Danielle

Boyz II Men make a cameo appearance as a group of teenagers that bully Jackie Jackson.

== Production ==
Jermaine Jackson and his then-partner Margaret Maldonado helped with the production of the series. Stan Margulies described the miniseries as exploring fame, fortune, and family, as well as both the price and success of it. He described it as not a docudrama but made as accurately as it can be. Michael Jackson approved of the script and Angela Bassett as his mother Katherine. Bassett refused to listen to agents' advice not to take on the role and became emotionally connected to the character.

Actor and dancer, Wylie Draper played adult Michael Jackson in the series. Draper died on December 20, 1993, at the age of 24 from Leukemia.

The role of young Marlon Jackson was given to actor Floyd Roger Myers Jr., who would later be featured in the third season of The Fresh Prince of Bel-Air, portraying a young Will Smith. Myers Jr. died in October 2025 at age 42.

== Reception ==
The Jacksons: An American Dream became one of the most popular and successful music-biography miniseries of the 1990s. Part 1 of the miniseries was the third highest-rated program broadcast during the week of November 9–15 with a 21.1 rating. Part 2 of the miniseries was watched by 38.4 million viewers in 22.3 million households becoming the highest-rated program broadcast during the week of November 16–22 posting a 23.9 rating, and 36 share. Overall, the miniseries was watched in 38.3 million households and posted a 22.3 rating and 33 share.

=== Critical response ===
On the review aggregator website Rotten Tomatoes, 45% of 40 critics' reviews are positive, with an average rating of 5.6/10. The website's consensus reads: "Despite its lavish musical numbers and visual flair, The Jacksons: An American Dream collapses under shallow characterizations and a fragmented narrative that turns one of showbiz's most prominent families into an emotionally hollow spectacle."

Todd Everett, writing in Variety, thought that the miniseries was bland, particularly in the first part, but praised Bassett's performance and called the series "a commendable effort at approximating the truth". Ken Tucker of Entertainment Weekly gave the miniseries a "C+", praising the acting but felt the series did not delve deeply into the later years of the family. The Biopic Story gave the miniseries three out of four stars.

=== Accolades ===
The series was ultimately nominated for four Emmy Awards, with Michael Peters winning the Primetime Emmy Award for Outstanding Individual Achievement in Choreography at the 45th Primetime Emmy Awards. The other nominations included Robert L. Stevenson for Outstanding Individual Achievement in Hairstyling for a Miniseries or a Special, Claude Riggins, Daniel J. Leahy, Michael C. Casper, and Gary Lux for Outstanding Sound Mixing for a Drama Miniseries or a Special for "Part 2," and Outstanding Miniseries. Bumper Robinson won a Young Artist Award for Best Young Actor in a Television Movie and Alex Burrall and Jason Weaver both won a special award for Outstanding Young Performers Starring in a Mini-Series at the 14th Youth in Film Awards.

=== Home media ===
The miniseries was later rebroadcast on VH1 and released to VHS and DVD. The DVD version of the miniseries was released as a two-disc set. The first disc was named The Early Years and the second disc was named The Success Years.

The miniseries aired frequently after the death of Michael Jackson. It has been shown on TV One, BET, Centric and VH1.

== Soundtrack ==
The Jacksons: An American Dream

Soundtrack album by The Jackson 5
- Released: October 20, 1992
- Length: 37:52
- Label: Motown

The Jackson 5/The Jacksons chronology
2300 Jackson Street (1989)	The Jacksons: An American Dream (1992)	Children of the Light (1993)

=== Track listing ===
No.	Title	Writer(s)	Artist(s)	Length
1.	"Who's Lovin' You" (live in Gary, Indiana, May 29, 1971)	Smokey Robinson		5:39
2.	"Kansas City"	Jerry Leiber and Mike Stoller	Jason Weaver	2:19
3.	"I'll Be There"	Berry Gordy; Bob West; Willie Hutch; Hal Davis		3:56
4.	"In the Still of the Nite (I'll Remember)"	Fred Parris	Boyz II Men	2:51
5.	"Medley: Walk On / The Love You Save" (live in Gary, Indiana, May 29, 1971)	The Corporation		6:05
6.	"I Wanna Be Where You Are"	Arthur Ross; Leon Ware	Jason Weaver	4:21
7.	"Dancing Machine"	H. Davis; Don Fletcher; Dean Parks		3:17
8.	"The Dream Goes On"	Andy Anderson; Eric Beall; Jermaine Jackson; John Barnes; Stephen Lunt	Jermaine Jackson	3:50
9.	"Medley: I Want You Back / ABC" (live at the Forum, August 26, 1972)	The Corporation		3:23
10.	"Stay with Love"	Dianne Quander; J. Jackson; Barnes	Jermaine Jackson and Syreeta Wright	4:19
11.	"Never Can Say Goodbye"	Clifton Davis		4:19
12.	"You Are the One" (interlude)	Taj Jackson; Taryll Jackson; T. J. Jackson	3T	1:51
13.	"Dancing Machine" (remix)	H. Davis; Fletcher; Parks		3:43
Total length:				37:52

=== Charts ===
Chart (1992/93)	Peak position
Australian Albums (ARIA Charts)	16

== See also ==
- Man in the Mirror: The Michael Jackson Story (2004)
- Michael Jackson: Searching for Neverland (2017)
- Michael (2026)
