= Brotherhood (3T album) =

Studio album by 3T
- Released: November 7, 1995
- Recorded: 1995
- Genre: Pop; R&B; new jack swing; soul
- Length: 55:19
- Label: MJJ; 550
- Producer: 3T; Gerald B.; Michael Vail Blum; Gardner Cole; Michael Jackson (also exec.); Kenneth Komisar (exec.); Max Martin; Mark Morales; Dean Pleasants; Denniz Pop; Mark C. Rooney; Chris Stokes; Damon Thomas

3T chronology
Brotherhood (1995)	Identity (2004)

Singles from Brotherhood
- 1. "Anything" Released: August 27, 1995; 2. "24/7" Released: October 28, 1995; 3. "Tease Me" Released: January 4, 1996; 4. "Why" Released: January 11, 1996; 5. "I Need You" Released: February 20, 1996; 6. "Gotta Be You" Released: March 12, 1996

Professional ratings
Review scores
Source	Rating
AllMusic	3/5 stars
Cash Box	(favorable)
Los Angeles Times	2.5/4 stars
Q	2/5 stars

Brotherhood is the debut studio album by American R&B group 3T. The album was released in 1995 through MJJ Music and 550 Music.

== Background ==
Produced by their uncle Michael Jackson, who also served as the executive producer with Kenneth Komisar, the album was released on Jackson's record label MJJ Music. In 1997, after 3T completed their tour, a Limited European Tour Edition was released that included a remix CD. The album was dedicated to the memory of the band's mother, Delores Vilma "Dee Dee" Jackson (April 1, 1955 – August 27, 1994), who was found dead floating in a swimming pool the year before the album's release.

== Commercial performance ==
Brotherhood sold three million copies worldwide. The album peaked at #127 on the US Billboard 200, while in the UK it peaked at #11 on the UK Albums Chart. Six singles were released: "Anything", "24/7" ", "Tease Me", "Why" (a duet with Michael Jackson), "I Need You" (with Michael Jackson on backing vocals) and "Gotta Be You".

== Track listing ==
No.	Title	Writer(s)	Producer(s)	Length
1.	"Anything"	Taj Jackson; Taryll Jackson; TJ Jackson	3T	5:21
2.	"24/7"	Gerald Baillergeau; Taryll Jackson; TJ Jackson	Gerald B.; 3T^{[a]}	4:39
3.	"Why" (featuring Michael Jackson)	Babyface	Michael Jackson	5:20
4.	"Gotta Be You" (featuring Herbie)	Herbie Crichlow; Max Martin; Denniz Pop	Martin; Pop	3:34
5.	"With You"	Taj Jackson; Taryll Jackson; TJ Jackson; Dean Pleasants	3T; Michael Vail Blum; Pleasants	5:00
6.	"Sexual Attention"	Robin Thicke; Damon Thomas	Thomas	4:09
7.	"Memories"	Taryll Jackson	Chris Stokes	4:32
8.	"I Need You"	Eric Carmen	Martin; Pop	3:55
9.	"Give Me All Your Lovin'"	Gardner Cole; Taj Jackson; Taryll Jackson; TJ Jackson	3T; Cole	4:08
10.	"Tease Me"	Balliergeau; Taryll Jackson	Gerald B.; 3T^{[a]}	5:28
11.	"Words Without Meaning"	Taryll Jackson	3T; Michael Jackson	4:00
12.	"Brotherhood" (featuring Prince Markie Dee)	Taj Jackson; Taryll Jackson; TJ Jackson; Mark Morales; Mark C. Rooney	3T; Morales; Rooney	5:10

Disc 2: Limited European Tour Edition
No.	Title	Writer(s)	Producer(s)	Length
1.	"Anything" (the 3T & D.T. remix)	Taj Jackson; Taryll Jackson; TJ Jackson	3T^{[b]}; D.T.^{[b]}	4:49
2.	"24/7" (Linslee's live mix)	Baillergeau; Taryll Jackson; TJ Jackson	Linslee Campbell^{[b]}	4:23
3.	"Tease Me" (Todd Terry's Tease Club Mix)	Balliergeau; Taryll Jackson	Gerald B.^{[b]}	4:52
4.	"Why" (DW bonus mix)	Babyface	Michael Jackson	5:04
5.	"I Need You" (Linslee Campbell mix)	Carmen	Campbell^{[b]}	5:24

- ^{^[a]} signifies a co-producer
- ^{^[b]} signifies a remixer

== Credits ==
- Paulinho Da Costa – percussion (track 1)
- Chuck Anthony – guitars (tracks 4 & 8)
- Jody Cortez – drums (track 5)
- Dean Pleasants – guitars, bass, organ (track 5)
- Luis Conte – percussion (track 5)
- Dean Parks – acoustic guitars (track 11)
- Jonathan Moffett – drums (track 11)
- Mark Morales – drum programming (track 12)
- Mark C. Rooney – keyboards (track 12)
- Damon Thomas – all instruments (track 6)
- Michael Jackson – backing vocals (tracks 3 & 8)
- Jeanette Söderholm – backing vocals (track 4)
- Herbie Crichlow – rap (track 4)

== Charts and certifications ==
=== Weekly charts ===
Chart (1996)	Peak position
Australian Albums (ARIA)	22
Belgian Albums (Ultratop Flanders)	5
Belgian Albums (Ultratop Wallonia)	10
Dutch Albums (Album Top 100)	12
European Albums Chart	21
French Albums (SNEP)	2
German Albums (Offizielle Top 100)	30
Norwegian Albums (VG-lista)	23
Scottish Albums (OCC)	45
Swedish Albums (Sverigetopplistan)	25
Swiss Albums (Schweizer Hitparade)	25
UK Albums (OCC)	11
US Billboard 200	127

=== Year-end charts ===
Chart (1996)	Position
Dutch Albums Chart	47
French Albums Chart	23
UK Albums (OCC)	96
Chart (1997)	Position
Belgian (Flanders) Albums Chart	64
Belgian (Wallonia) Albums Chart	73
Dutch Albums Chart	36

=== Certifications ===
Region	Certification	Certified units/sales
Australia (ARIA)	Gold	35,000^{^}
Belgium (BRMA)	Platinum	50,000^{*}
France (SNEP)	Platinum	330,000
Germany	—	120,000
Netherlands (NVPI)	Gold	50,000^{^}
Switzerland (IFPI Switzerland)	Gold	25,000^{^}
United Kingdom (BPI)	Gold	170,000
^{*} Sales figures based on certification alone.^{^} Shipments figures based on certification alone.
