= 24/7 (3T song) =

Single by 3T

from the album Brotherhood
- Released: October 28, 1995
- Recorded: 1995
- Genre: R&B; pop
- Length: 4:39
- Label: Epic; MJJ
- Songwriters: Taryll Jackson; T. J. Jackson
- Producer: Gerald B.

3T singles chronology
"Anything" (1995)	"24/7" (1995)	"Tease Me" (1996)

Music video
- "24/7" on YouTube

"24/7" is a song by American R&B/pop music trio 3T, released as the second single from their debut album, Brotherhood (1995). It was released only in Europe and Oceania.

== Critical reception ==
Alan Jones from Music Week wrote that the song "is a delicate and pretty release, slightly faster in tempo, but still not working up a head of sweat. Their harmonies are light and sweet and recall Uncle Michael at his best. Another hit."

== Track listing ==
- CD maxi #1
1. "24/7" (radio edit) – 3:56
2. "24/7" (Maurice's radio edit) – 4:35
3. "24/7" (Linslee's master mix) – 4:34
4. "24/7" (Linslee's live mix) – 4:34
- CD maxi #2
1. "24/7" (album version) – 4:39
2. "24/7" (Maurice's 24 Hour club mix) – 6:30
3. "24/7" (Maurice's 24/7 dub) – 4:42
4. "Anything" (Spanish version) – 4:34

== Charts ==
Chart performance for "24/7"
Chart (1996)	Peak position
Australia (ARIA)	29
Europe (Eurochart Hot 100)	51
Europe (European AC Radio)	14
Europe (European Dance Radio)	3
Europe (European Hit Radio)	35
Europe (Atlantic Crossovers)	10
Germany (GfK)	67
Netherlands (Dutch Top 40)	16
Netherlands (Single Top 100)	14
New Zealand (Recorded Music NZ)	21
Spain Airplay (Top 40 Radio)	33
Sweden (Sverigetopplistan)	28
Switzerland (Schweizer Hitparade)	32
UK Singles (Official Charts)	11
UK Airplay (Music Week)	15
