= Tease Me (3T song) =

Single by 3T

from the album Brotherhood
- Released: April 16, 1996
- Length: 5:28 (album version); 4:25 (single edit)
- Label: Epic; MJJ
- Songwriters: Taryll Jackson; Gerald B.
- Producer: Gerald B.

3T singles chronology
"24/7" (1995)	"Tease Me" (1996)	"Why" (1996)

Music video
- "Tease Me" on YouTube

"Tease Me" is a song by American R&B/pop music trio 3T, released in 1996 as the second single from their debut album, Brotherhood (1995). The original idea of the song belongs to Taryll Jackson, who co-wrote the lyrics.

== Critical reception ==
Larry Flick from Billboard magazine described the song as a "seductive rhythm ballad". He noted that "the lyrics are suave and delivered with a youthful soul that will keep the kids happy, while appealing to older pop listeners."

== Charts ==
Chart (1996)	Peak position
New Zealand (Recorded Music NZ)	20
US Bubbling Under Hot 100 Singles (Billboard)	3
US Hot R&B Singles (Billboard)	90
