= Identity (3T album) =

Studio album by 3T
- Released: December 29, 2004 (France); January 18, 2005 (U.S.)
- Genre: Pop
- Labels: TF1 Musique; Warner Music; Brotherhood Inc.
- Producer: 3T

3T chronology
Brotherhood (1995)	Identity (2004/2005)	Chapter III (2015)

Singles from Identity
- 1. "Stuck on You" Released: November 25, 2003; 2. "Sex Appeal" Released: April 4, 2004

Identity is the second studio album by American R&B group 3T. The album was first released independently and was then released through Warner Music. The album spawned two singles including "Stuck on You" and "Sex Appeal" and the Tredox remix for "Sex Appeal" features their cousin DEALZ. In Germany, the album was re-titled Sex Appeal.

== Release history ==
- On December 29, 2004, the album was released in France by TF1 Musique. This version contained #13 as a bonus track.
- On January 18, 2005, the album was released in the USA by Fonky Records.
- On December 21, 2007, the album was released by WEA International. This version contained the two bonus tracks.
- In 2008, the album was available as a digital download on iTunes and Amazon MP3.

== Track listing ==
- All tracks written by Taj Jackson, Taryll Jackson, and TJ Jackson, except where noted.

No.	Title	Writer(s)	Length
1.	"Detour"	Taryll Jackson; TJ Jackson	3:06
2.	"Sex Appeal"		3:50
3.	"Guilty"		3:43
4.	"I Appreciate"	Taryll Jackson; TJ Jackson	5:06
5.	"Party Tonight"		3:52
6.	"Stubborn (It's a Shame)"	Taryll Jackson	3:44
7.	"Stuck on You"	Lionel Richie	3:35
8.	"Without You"		3:55
9.	"Disappeared"	Taryll Jackson; TJ Jackson	3:29
10.	"They Say"		3:58
11.	"Someone to Love"	Taryll Jackson	5:32
12.	"Thankful"	Taryll Jackson	4:04

Bonus tracks
No.	Title	Writer(s)	Length
13.	"Sex Appeal" (Organized Playas remix)		3:48
14.	"Stuck on You" (smooth mix)	Richie	4:00

== Charts ==
Chart (2004)	Peak position
Belgian Albums (Ultratop Wallonia)	37
Dutch Albums (MegaCharts)	32
French Albums (SNEP)	74
