= Chapter III (3T album) =

- Original U.S. cover, featuring a childhood photo of 3T

Studio album by 3T
- Released: November 13, 2015 (U.S.); May 25, 2018 (Europe)
- Recorded: 1999–2015
- Genre: R&B; soul; pop
- Length: 36:00
- Label: Warrior
- Producer: 3T

3T chronology
Identity (2004)	Chapter III (2015)

Singles from Chapter III
- 1. "The Story of Love" Released: 2015; 2. "Power of Love" Released: 2015

Chapter III is the third studio album by American R&B/pop music group 3T. Initially self-released in the U.S. on November 13, 2015, the album was distributed in Europe by Warrior Records on May 25, 2018.

The entire album was written and produced solely by the trio and is their first release since Identity (2004).

== Track listing ==
All tracks are written by Taj Jackson, Taryll Jackson, and T. J. Jackson.

No.	Title	Length
1.	"That's Our Family (Intro)"	0:26
2.	"Power of Love"	4:41
3.	"Gotta Have You"	2:59
4.	"Heaven"	4:10
5.	"Fire"	4:44
6.	"Missing You"	3:51
7.	"Sugar"	4:13
8.	"I Do (The Wedding Song)"	4:14
9.	"Forever Girl"	3:24
10.	"The Story of Love"	3:25
Total length:		36:00
