= Why (3T song) =

1996 single by 3T

Single by 3T featuring Michael Jackson

from the album Brotherhood
- B-side: "Didn't Mean to Hurt You"; "What Will It Take"; "Tease Me"
- Released: January 11, 1996
- Recorded: 1994–1995
- Genre: Soul
- Length: 5:20 (album version); 4:10 (radio edit)
- Label: Epic; MJJ
- Songwriter: Kenneth "Babyface" Edmonds
- Producer: Michael Jackson

3T singles chronology
"Tease Me" (1996)	"Why" (1996)	"I Need You" (1996)

Michael Jackson singles chronology
"Earth Song" (1995)	"Why" (1996)	"They Don't Care About Us" (1996)

Music video
- "Why" on YouTube

"Why" is a song by American R&B group 3T featuring their uncle Michael Jackson. It was written by Kenneth "Babyface" Edmonds. Jackson also produced it. The song was released as the fourth single from the group's debut album, Brotherhood (1995). "Why" was well received on European and Asian music charts.

== Critical reception ==
British magazine Music Week gave the song a full score of five out of five, adding, "This smoochy soul ballad bringing together the family is a dead cert for the top three, with the older Jackson's vocals making it possible number one material."

== Music video ==
A music video was produced to promote the single, featuring 3T and Jackson. It is shot in black-and-white and was also released on the Michael Jackson box set, Michael Jackson's Vision.

== Track listing ==
- CD single
1. "Why" (radio edit) – 4:10
2. "Didn't Mean to Hurt You" ('96) – 4:30
- CD single #2
1. "Why" (radio edit) – 4:10
2. "Tease Me" (single edit) – 4:25
- CD maxi
1. "Why" (radio edit) – 4:10
2. "Tease Me" (single edit) – 4:25
3. "Didn't Mean to Hurt You" – 5:45
4. "What Will It Take" – 5:16
- CD maxi #2
1. "Why" (album version) – 5:28
2. "Tease Me" (Todd Terry's Tease club mix) – 6:49
3. "Tease Me" (Todd Terry's TNT Tease dub) – 6:11
4. "Tease Me" (acapella) – 4:40

== Charts ==
=== Weekly charts ===
Chart (1996)	Peak position
Australia (ARIA)	46
Austria (Ö3 Austria Top 40)	21
Belgium (Ultratop 50 Flanders)	19
Belgium (Ultratop 50 Wallonia)	10
Europe (Eurochart Hot 100)	14
Europe (European AC Radio)	2
Europe (European Dance Radio)	1
Europe (European Hit Radio)	5
Europe (Atlantic Crossovers)	2
France (SNEP)	9
France Airplay (SNEP)	6
Germany (GfK)	29
Hungary (Mahasz)	8
Iceland (Íslenski Listinn Topp 40)	27
Ireland (IRMA)	14
Latvia (Latvijas Top 20)	13
Netherlands (Dutch Top 40)	10
Netherlands (Single Top 100)	13
New Zealand (Recorded Music NZ)	9
Poland Airplay (Music & Media)	8
Scotland (OCC)	4
Spain Airplay (Top 40 Radio)	28
Sweden (Sverigetopplistan)	14
Switzerland (Schweizer Hitparade)	11
UK Singles (OCC)	2
UK Airplay (Music Week)	4
UK R&B (OCC)	1
US Bubbling Under Hot 100 Singles (Billboard)	12
US Hot R&B Singles (Billboard)	71

=== Year-end charts ===
Chart (1996)	Position
Belgium (Ultratop 50 Wallonia)	63
Europe (Eurochart Hot 100)	72
Europe (Atlantic Crossovers)	22
France (SNEP)	43
France Airplay (SNEP)	40
Netherlands (Dutch Top 40)	67
Netherlands (Single Top 100)	94
Sweden (Topplistan)	68
UK Singles (OCC)	70

== Certifications ==
Region	Certification	Certified units/sales
France (SNEP)	Silver	125,000^{*}
^{*} Sales figures based on certification alone.
