= The Jacksons: A Family Dynasty =

- Genre: Reality
- Starring: Jermaine Jackson; Jackie Jackson; Marlon Jackson; Tito Jackson
- Theme music composer: Michael Jackson; Jackie Jackson
- Opening theme: "Can You Feel It"
- Country of origin: United States
- Original language: English
- No. of seasons: 1
- No. of episodes: 6

Production
- Running time: 42 minutes

Original release
- Network: A&E
- Release: December 13, 2009 – January 17, 2010

The Jacksons: A Family Dynasty is an American reality television series starring members of the musical Jackson family which aired on A&E. Prior to the debut of the series, the show had initially been filmed as a one-off hour-long special about The Jacksons (minus lead singer Michael and younger brother Randy), and their intention to release an album and begin a tour in celebration of the band's fortieth year in music. Following Michael's death in June 2009, more footage of the family was shot and it was commissioned as series.

The show debuted on December 13, 2009 and ended on January 27, 2010.

== Production ==
The original intention behind the creation of the series—initially titled The Jackson Family—was that it would be a one-off hour-long special aired by the cable network A&E. The show was to center around The Jacksons (previously known as The Jackson 5) and their planning of a new album and tour in celebration of the band's fortieth year in the music industry. The initial filming of the brothers began in January 2009, but did not involve lead singer Michael Jackson. It was finished days before the entertainer's death in June 2009, which subsequently influenced the show's production company, Point 7 Entertainment, to shoot more footage and air it as a television series. Robert Sharenow, a senior worker for A&E, stated in July 2009 that the original show was commissioned as a special but that the company thought of all of their specials as "backdoor pilots".

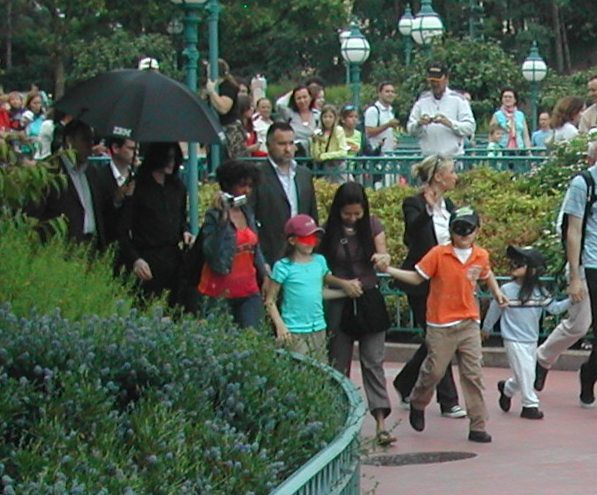
Speculation on whether Michael Jackson's children would appear in the show surfaced shortly after his death.

The new footage was to showcase the Jackson family coping with the loss of Michael. Executive producer Jodi Gomes of Point 7 Entertainment noted that those involved with the series wanted a television show that was "very genuine". She added that the Jackson siblings were "not shy about talking about their brother, they just want to find it a way to do it honestly." Gomes concluded that they had "done a great job opening up about losing a brother".

Debate arose in the media as to whether Michael Jackson's three children (Prince, Paris and Blanket) were to appear in the series. The magazine Us Weekly commented that the trio would be featured in some capacity in the series, despite some members of the Jackson family being opposed to the idea; Michael's elder sister Rebbie—who along with La Toya and Janet, were not involved with the production—supposedly felt that "he would spin in his grave if he knew his kids would be on this show". (For the majority of their early lives, Michael had attempted to keep his children out of the spotlight by using hats, masks, veils and other disguises.) Jackson's mother Katherine, the legal guardian of the three, denounced the rumours that her grandchildren would be starring in the show. A&E Network also issued a statement proclaiming that the three youngsters would not be appearing in the series at that particular time, but that appearances in the future were a possibility:

"A&E's series will chronicle the unscripted real lives of, principally, four Jackson brothers — Jackie, Jermaine, Tito and Marlon — as they go about their lives following the death of their brother Michael. Filming is taking place right now. As production moves forward, it is entirely possible that the brothers' paths will intersect with other members of the Jackson family, who may or may not be included in the finished series. However, we cannot at this point definitively know who else may make an appearance in the series."

== Episodes ==
No.	Title	Original release date
1	"The Jackson Family"	December 13, 2009
Jackie, Jermaine, Marlon and Tito announce at a press conference that they are to release an album to mark the 40th anniversary of the Jackson 5. At their family's Californian mansion, they hold a party to celebrate the milestone. Afterward, they begin a choreography session for a possible return to the stage. The siblings also start work on the production of the new album, but they face disagreements regarding it and Jermaine becomes upset after Jackie erases a track that he had been working on. Acting upon a suggestion from their mother Katherine, Marlon and Tito return to their hometown of Gary, Indiana, where they visit their former school and house. Back together at the family home in California, the brothers have a heart-to-heart discussion about their departure from Motown and they become emotional as they reflect on the situation. Later, after the news is broken that their brother Michael has died, the Jackson siblings assert that they are to continue on in his legacy.
2	"The Aftermath"	December 13, 2009
Jackie and Marlon individually recount the moments in which they were informed of Michael's death. Jermaine asserts that in death his younger sibling is now at peace, as he states that his brother faced much pain and ridicule in life. Two months after Michael's burial, his four older brothers meet with their family attorney Virgil Roberts, who informs them that a concert promoter has threatened to reveal that the siblings have reneged on an agreement to perform for them and that they want the brothers to prepare for a concert within eight weeks. The information is met with a negative reaction from the four, who reveal that they are no longer interested in doing the reunion show. Afterward, they contact producers Jimmy Jam and Terry Lewis, who agree to help them with two new songs for the concert, which the siblings have yet to agree to. Later, Jermaine announces that he is to prepare a Michael Jackson tribute concert in Vienna. His brothers are made aware of the plans by a television announcement and subsequently attend a photoshoot without him, as he has refused to attend. Meanwhile, Tito and his three sons (3T) start work on a solo album for the Jackson 5 member. Thereafter, Jermaine meets up with his brothers to state that he did not attend the group photoshoot because he was tired and suffering from conjunctivitis. They also agree that they are to go ahead with the group concert.
3	"The Jacksons Abroad"	December 20, 2009
4	"Come Together"	January 3, 2010
5	"Lock Down"	January 10, 2010
6	"Now, What?"	January 17, 2010

== Reception ==
Criticism of the series began before it had even premiered. Lisa de Moraes of The Washington Post expressed her opinion that people would have watched the original show before Michael Jackson's death, when it was a "lame 'See the Non-Michael Jackson Brothers Go on Tour' special". De Moraes claimed that such individuals were the type to have celebrity news website TMZ.com as their homepage. During her report of the preview of the show, De Moraes followed up on Jermaine Jackson's ponderings on how to pull off a successful reunion with his "brothers".

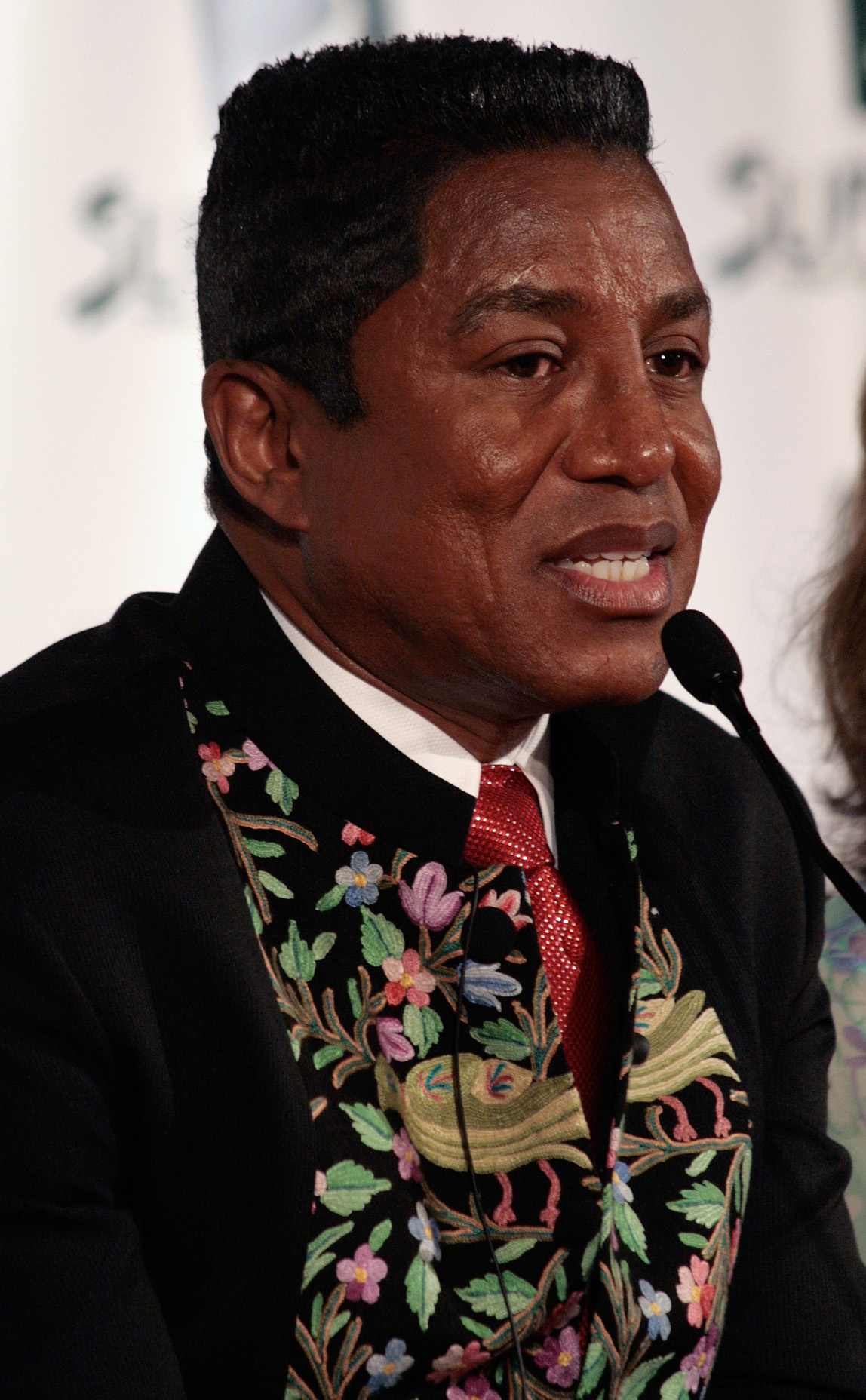
A scene from The Jacksons: A Family Dynasty in which Jermaine Jackson cries was described as being a "high point" in a review of the show in The Spokesman-Review.

Frazier Moore condemned The Jacksons: A Family Dynasty as being "stagey, self-conscious and, most of all, self-serving on the part of its participants" in an article for The Spokesman-Review. He stated that some people may enjoy the program and highlighted a moment in which Jermaine Jackson cries as being a "high point" for him. Moore added that the emotional scene featuring Jermaine and his three brothers seemed to have been carefully arranged so that they would get "maximum visual effect".

In an Entertainment Weekly review of the series' first episode, Ken Tucker revealed that he felt that the Jackson brothers, in serving as executive producers, had created a very "stage-managed and controlled" reality television show. He felt that such actions on the part of the siblings made other moments in the show more interesting. Tucker concluded that with the absence of Michael and younger brother Randy, the show served to only show viewers "what an uphill battle the other brothers face in trying to stay in the public eye". He rated the episode "C+".

Writing for The New York Times, Mike Hale conveyed his thoughts on the first episode. He suggested that it would be easy to view the series as an exploitation of Michael Jackson by his family, in order for them to gain money from the late entertainer's legacy. He countered that such opinions were not reflected in the content of the show, which he felt showed the Jackson siblings' egos and "childlike need for affirmation" as a larger motivator. Like Tucker, Hale expressed that the show suffered due to there being no Michael Jackson. He explained that while the other brothers had led fascinating lives, they were not fascinating individuals. Hale finished his review by stating that "The Jackson 4" had talent and charm, but that those positive qualities are outweighed by "self-absorption and arrested development".

Mary McNamara of the Los Angeles Times also spoke negatively of the show. In the daily Californian publication, she voiced her cynicism over the Jackson siblings' motivation behind the production of the series and why they had wanted to star in it. McNamara offered the opinion that perhaps the four took part in the show to attain some of the attention and following that their younger brother Michael had during his lifetime. She also stated, like those before her, that the lack of Michael Jackson was a loss to the show, and concluded that if it were not for the singer being dead, the series would have most likely never have aired.

Reviewing the first episodes of the series for San Jose Mercury News, journalist Chuck Barney acknowledged the "obvious voyeuristic intrigue" that came with the series following Michael Jackson's death. While the run of programs was billed as offering "unprecedented access" into the lives of the surviving siblings, Barney warned that the series was over-hyped and that it sounds more interesting than it is in actuality. He commented that some parts of the show were "ridiculous", while pointing towards the theme of "brotherly pettiness" which ran through the majority of the two previews he was provided with. Barney concluded that while some moments in the show were poignant, the most engaging sections of the episodes were the clips that showed the Jackson 5 at the height of their fame. "When you mentally juxtapose those images against scenes of four bickering middle-aged guys, it becomes apparent that there are times when it's much more fun to live in the past."

Critical comments also came from Alan Pergament, who was writing for The Buffalo News. The journalist stated that the series opened with two "excruciating" hourlong episodes and scoffed that viewers would "need a magnifying glass to find something interesting here". Labeling Jermaine Jackson "the diva of the group", Pergament insisted that there was much contrived controversy in the show and that the first two hours had a "lifeless, going-through-the-motions quality", despite his view that Jermaine and Tito added a "little personality" to the shows. Awarding the show one star out of four, Pergament concluded that the shows were "an unnecessary, dull creation that cashes in on the family name without providing the thing that Michael was best known for — entertainment."

Journalist Randee Dawn also expressed cynicism regarding why the brothers would want to participate in a reality television show so soon after their younger sibling's death. Dawn noted, however, that the Jackson family were, in her opinion, "not like most folks. They are sui generis, an entity unto itself." The writer asserted that spontaneity was lacking in the show, due to the four brothers wearing sunglasses and joking around. Overall, Dawn felt that the episodes reflected the image of a "high-concept press kit", but acknowledged that the siblings were dedicated to the project.
