= DTLA (TV series) =

- Genre: Drama; Comedy
- Created by: Larry Kennar
- Directed by: Larry Kennar
- Composer: Alexander Bornstein
- Countries of origin: United States; Canada
- Original language: English
- No. of seasons: 1
- No. of episodes: 9

Production
- Executive producers: Larry Kennar; Darryl Stephens; Michael Andres Palmieri; Helen Shaw
- Producer: Charisse Reneau
- Cinematography: Alex Milosevic
- Production companies: Larry Kennar Entertainment; OUTtv

Original release
- Network: OUTtv; Logo
- Release: October 24 – December 1, 2012

DTLA (acronym for Downtown Los Angeles) is a gay-themed television series which premiered October 24, 2012. The series was created, and is co-produced and directed by Larry Kennar. It follows a group of friends in Downtown Los Angeles under the slogan: One City, Seven Lives / Old Friends, New Stories. The seven main characters are Lenny, Bryan, Sara Jane, Matthew, Marky, Kai and Stefan.

== Cast ==
- Darryl Stephens as Leonard "Lenny", a civil litigation attorney and Bryan's boyfriend of six years
- Matthew Stephen Herrick as Bryan, a stoner and Lenny's boyfriend who has been unemployed for over a year
- Marshelle Fair as SJ, a Professor of fashion merchandizing, textiles, and accessories, she is a college friend of Lenny, Kai and Kevin, and estranged wife of Norm
- Hiro Tanaka as Kai Nakamoto, a high school math teacher
- Scott Pretty as Marky, a military man and boyfriend of Matthew
- Patrick McDonald as Matthew Bouvier, Bryan's friend who recently moved to LA to be an actor
- Ernest Pierce as Stefan, a lawyer and friend of Lenny
- JC Jones as Trey, Stefan's young boyfriend, he works in a doughnut shop part-time and has a stage act at night as a drag queen
- Jeremy Jackson as Kevin, a former model, college friend of Lenny, Kai, and SJ, who recently moved back to LA for a new start
- Michael Basilli as Rafi, a manager of a Downtown Los Angeles club, who after meeting Kai soon becomes a romantic interest of Kai
- B. Scott as Bosco, owner of a restaurant they frequently gather at
- Sandra Bernhard as Carla, one of Bryan's mothers
- Melanie Griffith as Kimberley, one of Bryan's mothers
- Paul Mooney as Silas, Lenny's estranged father
- AzMarie Livingston as Ricki, Kimberly's current girlfriend
- William McNamara as Norm, a lawyer and SJ's husband
- Ryan Izay as Rod
- Cesar D' La Torre as Ceasar Gomez
- Luenell as Racine, Trey's mother and Ressie's sister
- Tiffany Pollard as Reesie, Trey's aunt and Racine's sister
- Jeffrey Damnit as Shef, one of Lenny's naked neighbors

== Production ==
DTLA was originally made as a movie. The U.S.'s two main LGBT cable channels were not enthusiastic about the project; here! passed on the project and Logo was initially non-committal. Brad Danks, COO of OUTtv said, "He called us because he had heard from people in the U.S. that we were doing good things in Canada with the service." After screening a rough cut of the movie for executives of OUTtv they commissioned a series instead. It was originally expected that the series would premiere on OUTtv in the late spring of 2012. On January 25, 2012 Kennar created an account on Kickstarter.com for the series, to secure the remaining required financing via crowd funding. In 6 days 50 people had pledged a total of $4762. On February 21, 2012 it was announced that they had surpassed their target of $25000. In April 2012 it was announced that the premiere of DTLA would be delayed until after the launch of OUTtv's HD channel which would be coming in a few months. In September 2012 it was announced that DTLA had been acquired by Logo. DTLA is the first series funded in part via Kickstarter to receive domestic and international distribution. Distribution outside of Canada and the U.S. is being handled by OUTtv.

== Episodes ==
No.	Title	Directed by	Written by	Canadian air date	U.S. air date
1	"Episode 1 – The Pilot - Part 1"	Larry Kennar	Larry Kennar	October 24, 2012	October 24, 2012
2	"Episode 2 – The Pilot – Part 2"	Larry Kennar	Larry Kennar	October 24, 2012	October 24, 2012
3	"Episode 3"	Larry Kennar	Larry Kennar	October 31, 2012	October 31, 2012
4	"Episode 4"	Larry Kennar	Darryl Stephens	November 7, 2012	November 7, 2012
5	"Episode 5"	Larry Kennar	Larry Kennar & Michael Andres Palmieri	November 14, 2012	November 17, 2012
6	"Episode 6"	Larry Kennar	Michael Andres Palmieri	November 21, 2012	November 24, 2012
7	"Episode 7"	Larry Kennar	Larry Kennar	November 28, 2012	November 24, 2012
8	"Episode 8 – Season Finale – Part 1"	Larry Kennar	Larry Kennar	December 5, 2012	December 1, 2012
9	"Episode 9 – Season Finale – Part 2"	Larry Kennar	Larry Kennar	December 12, 2012	December 1, 2012
