= Taj Jackson =

American musician and producer (born 1973)

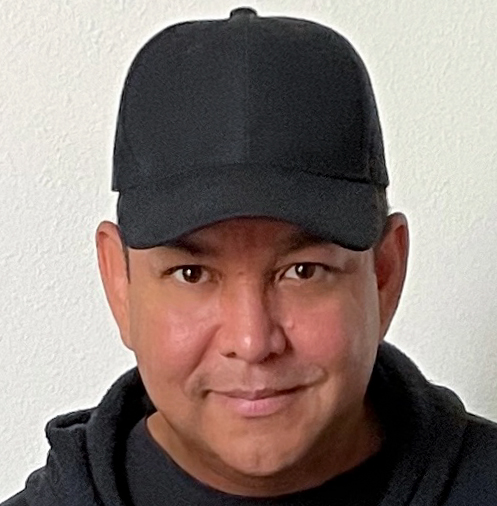
- Jackson in 2022
- Born: Tariano Adaryll Jackson II; August 4, 1973 (age 53); Los Angeles, California, U.S.
- Occupations: Singer; songwriter; musician; director; producer
- Years active: 1992–present
- Spouse: Thayana Sco (m. 2013)
- Children: 3
- Father: Tito Jackson
- Family: Jackson
- Musical career
- Genres: Pop; R&B; soul
- Instrument: Vocals
- Labels: Sony; Warner Bros.; Epic; MJJ Music; 550; Warrior
- Member of: 3T
- Website: tajjackson.com

Tariano Adaryll "Taj" Jackson II (born August 4, 1973) is an American singer, songwriter, producer, and director. He is an original member of 3T, along with his brothers Taryll Adren Jackson and Tito Joe ("TJ") Jackson. His career includes work in television and documentary production, and he has appeared publicly as a spokesperson on behalf of the Jackson family. As of 2023, 3T were touring.

== Early life and education ==
Tariano Adaryll "Taj" Jackson II was born on August 4, 1973, in Los Angeles, California. He is the first child of Tito Jackson and Delores "Dee Dee" Martes. Through his mother, he is of Dominican descent. He is the nephew of Rebbie, Jackie, Jermaine, La Toya, Marlon, Michael, Randy, and Janet. He has two younger brothers, Taryll Adren Jackson and Tito Joe Jackson ("TJ"). Jackson's parents married in June 1972 and divorced in 1988.

Jackson graduated from Buckley School in 1991. He studied television production and recording arts at Loyola Marymount University, with a minor in music.

== Career ==
=== 3T ===
Under the guidance of their father Tito and uncle Michael, Jackson and his brothers formed the group 3T. Michael mentored the group and signed them to his label, MJJ Music. Their debut album, Brotherhood, was released in 1995. Its debut single was "Anything".

3T recorded an album after Brotherhood, which was not released due to a strained relationship between Sony and MJJ Music. The group later released Identity in 2004 and Chapter III in 2015. They have written and produced music for films including The Jacksons: An American Dream, Free Willy, Free Willy 2: The Adventure Home, Men in Black, and Trippin'. Jackson has directed music videos and documentary projects. As of 2022, 3T were touring and headlining concerts and music festivals.

=== Reality series (2015–2016) ===
In October 2015, Jackson, Taryll, and TJ starred in and co-produced the reality series The Jacksons: Next Generation. The series aired on Lifetime (TV network) in USA, Canada, UK, Ireland, Asia (2016), and South Africa from 2015 to 2016.

=== Solo work and other projects ===
In 2014, Big Screen Entertainment Group optioned the rights to Code Z, a script by Jackson and the Brazilian Sco triplets (Thaisa, Thaina, and Thayana Sco). He directed the short film.

In 2018, Jackson directed the music video for 3T's song "Fire". He also pursued photography; his uncle Michael bought him his first camera and video camera. As of 2023, Jackson was working on a documentary series addressing public perceptions of Michael.

== Personal life ==
=== Family ===
Jackson married Thayana Sco Jackson on June 16, 2013, at Hayvenhurst, the Jackson family home. His uncle Jermaine performed at the event. The couple have three daughters. Jackson has stated that he experienced abuse from an uncle on his mother's side during childhood and that his uncle Michael was supportive during that period.

In August 1994, Jackson's mother, Dee Dee, was found dead in her backyard swimming pool in Ladera Heights, California. In August 1995, he and family members filed a wrongful death suit against her then-boyfriend, Don Bohana. Her death was initially ruled accidental. Bohana was later charged and convicted of second‑degree murder in 1998.

=== Charity work ===
After the death of their mother, Jackson and his brothers launched the Dee Dee Jackson Foundation, a non-profit organization providing community and music therapy support to individuals who have lost family members. In 2021, the foundation received a HOPEE Award (Helping Others Practice Enduring Empowerment). Jackson collaborates with his cousin Prince Jackson to design a haunted house for Thriller Night, a Halloween event supporting the Heal Los Angeles Foundation.

=== Advocacy for Michael Jackson ===
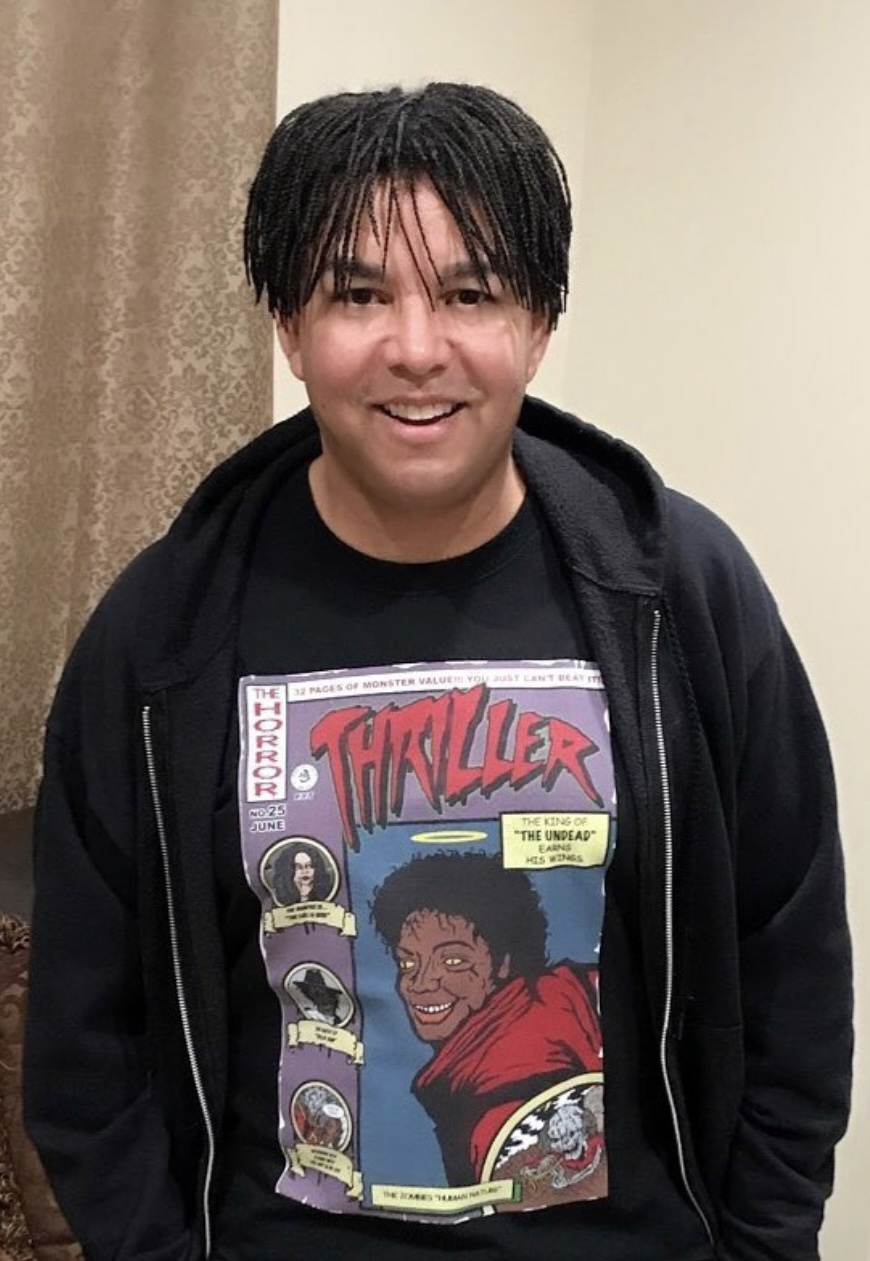
Jackson wearing a shirt depicting his uncle Michael

During and after the 2019 release of Leaving Neverland, Jackson participated in media interviews responding to the film's allegations. He has stated that he believes the allegations against Michael were unfounded and has referenced FBI investigations that did not result in charges. Jackson also commented publicly on Wade Robson, including Robson's attendance at his uncle Michael's 2009 memorial. Jackson has said that his cousin Brandi had a relationship with Robson during the period Robson alleges abuse. Jackson and Brandi appeared in Neverland Firsthand: Investigating the Michael Jackson Documentary, which addressed claims made in Leaving Neverland.

Jackson appeared in the 2019 documentary Square One: Michael Jackson, which examined the 1993 child sexual abuse allegations against Michael.

In November 2020, journalist Martin Bashir was criticized for his methods in securing his 1995 interview with Diana, Princess of Wales. Jackson and his family subsequently announced an inquiry into Bashir's role in obtaining his uncle Michael's participation in the 2003 documentary Living with Michael Jackson.

In August 2022, Rolling Stone referred to Harry Styles as the "new King of Pop." The description was criticized by Jackson fans and by Jackson, who noted that the title was associated with his uncle Michael's estate. In March 2023, Jackson criticized comments made by Chris Rock in a Netflix special regarding his uncle Michael and R. Kelly.
