= Euclid Beach Band =

American rock band, founded in 1978 in Cleveland, Ohio

- Origin: Cleveland, Ohio, U.S.
- Genre: Rock
- Years active: 1978–1980, 1982
- Labels: Cleveland International, Epic
- Past members: Jim Girard; Rich Reising; Pete Hewlett; John Hart

The Euclid Beach Band was a rock band from Cleveland, Ohio best known for their local hit song "There's No Surf in Cleveland". The band was formed in 1978 by Scene magazine editor Jim Girard and Rich Reising, a guitarist in Eric Carmen's band who also worked at Scene. The group took its name from Euclid Beach Park, a defunct amusement park which closed in 1969.

"There's No Surf in Cleveland" was written by Girard and Reising as a "pro-Cleveland song" at a time when the city's reputation was waning. The song is performed in the style of the Beach Boys with elaborate vocal harmonies by Pete Hewlett and John Hart. It was recorded with various local musicians during the Great Blizzard of 1978 and after seeing television coverage of Red Cross volunteers rescuing people during the storm, all proceeds from the record were donated to the Cleveland Chapter of the American Red Cross. The record was released in May 1978 and quickly became the top selling single in the Cleveland area and reached No. 80 on the Record World singles chart and No. 103 in Cash Box.

Following the success of "There's No Surf in Cleveland", Reising was offered a recording contract by Steve Popovich of Cleveland International Records. The band's self-titled debut album, produced by Eric Carmen, was released in August 1979 but did not chart. The album was preceded by the single "I Need You", a song written by Carmen. The single reached No. 81 on the Billboard Hot 100 in April 1979. The group disbanded in 1980.

Reising and Hart reunited as the Euclid Beach Band in 1982 to record another single, "Headlands", a tribute to Headlands Beach State Park in Mentor, Ohio.
