= Stuck on You (Lionel Richie song) =

1984 single by Lionel Richie

Single by Lionel Richie

from the album Can't Slow Down
- B-side: "Round and Round"
- Released: June 1984
- Recorded: 1983
- Genre: Country pop, soft rock
- Length: 3:10
- Label: Motown
- Songwriter: Lionel Richie
- Producers: Lionel Richie; James Anthony Carmichael

Lionel Richie singles chronology
"Hello" (1984)	"Stuck on You" (1984)	"Penny Lover" (1984)

Audio
- "Stuck On You" on YouTube

"Stuck on You" is a song written and originally recorded by American singer and songwriter Lionel Richie. It was the fourth single released from his second studio album, Can't Slow Down, released in June 1984, by Motown, and achieved chart success, particularly in the US and the UK, where it peaked at number three and number 12, respectively. "Stuck on You" reached number one on the Adult Contemporary chart, Richie's seventh chart topper.

The song marks Lionel Richie's country music debut and the single's cover photo shows Richie wearing a cowboy hat. "Stuck on You" peaked at number 24 on the Country chart.

== Background ==
The song differs from Richie's other compositions, as it displays a country pop influence rather than R&B.

Cash Box described the song as "an airtight and tender ballad with a nearly country twinge."

== Track listings ==
- 7" single
1. "Stuck on You" – 3:10
2. "Round and Round" – 4:48
- 12" maxi
1. "Stuck on You" – 3:10
2. "Round and Round" – 4:48
3. "Tell Me" – 5:28

== Charts ==
=== Weekly charts ===
Chart (1984)	Peak position
Australia (Kent Music Report)	24
Belgium (Ultratop 50 Flanders)	13
Brazil (ABPD)	4
Canada Top Singles (RPM)	3
Canada Adult Contemporary (RPM)	1
Canada Country Singles (RPM)	18
Chile (UPI)	9
Finland (Suomen virallinen lista)	22
Guatemala (UPI)	5
Ireland (IRMA)	2
Netherlands (Dutch Top 40)	21
Netherlands (Single Top 100)	18
New Zealand (Recorded Music NZ)	26
Peru (UPI)	7
Switzerland (Schweizer Hitparade)	26
UK Singles (Official Charts)	12
US Billboard Hot 100	3
US Adult Contemporary (Billboard)	1
US Hot Country Songs (Billboard)	24
US Hot Black Singles (Billboard)	8
West Germany (GfK)	45

=== Year-end charts ===
Chart (1984)	Position
US Top Pop Singles (Billboard)	32
US Adult Contemporary (Billboard)	3

== Certifications ==
Region	Certification	Certified units/sales
Denmark (IFPI Danmark)	Gold	45,000^{‡}
New Zealand (RMNZ)	Platinum	30,000^{‡}
United Kingdom (BPI)	Gold	400,000^{‡}
^{‡} Sales+streaming figures based on certification alone.

== 3T version ==
"Stuck on You"

Single by 3T

from the album Identity
- B-side: "Disappeared"
- Released: November 25, 2003
- Recorded: 2002
- Genre: Dance-pop
- Length: 3:32
- Label: DOF; Warner
- Songwriter: Lionel Richie
- Producer: 3T

3T singles chronology
"Eternal Flame" (1996)	"Stuck on You" (2003)	"Sex Appeal" (2003)

Music video
- "Stuck on You" on YouTube

In 2003, "Stuck on You" was covered by American group 3T. It was the first single from their second studio album Identity, on which the song also appears in a remixed version called the "Smooth Mix" (also available on the CD maxi). Released in summer 2003, it achieved success in the Netherlands, Belgium and France, where it was a top ten hit.

=== Track listings ===
- CD maxi
1. "Stuck on You" – 3:32
2. "Stuck on You" (smooth mix) – 3:58
3. "Disappeared" – 3:32
- CD single – promo
1. "Stuck on You" (radio mix) – 3:32

=== Charts ===
==== Weekly charts ====
Chart (2003–2004)	Peak position
Belgium (Ultratop 50 Wallonia)	4
Canada Hot 100 (Billboard)	3
France (SNEP)	10
Germany (GfK)	100
Netherlands (Dutch Top 40)	5
Netherlands (Single Top 100)	3
Sweden (Sverigetopplistan)	45
Switzerland (Schweizer Hitparade)	32

==== Year-end charts ====
Chart (2003)	Position
Belgium (Ultratop Wallonia)	50
France (SNEP)	60
Chart (2004)	Position
Netherlands (Dutch Top 40)	16
Netherlands (Single Top 100)	14

=== Certifications ===
Region	Certification	Certified units/sales
France (SNEP)	Silver	125,000^{*}
^{*} Sales figures based on certification alone.

== Other versions and sampling ==
- British reggae singer Trevor Walters covered the song in 1984 (only 3 months after the original). This version was Walters' biggest hit in his home country peaking inside the top 10 of the UK Singles Chart, higher than Richie's original.
- The song's chorus was used in the 2010 song "Stuck on Replay" by German EDM group Scooter.
- In 2022, the song was used in a Super Bowl LVI commercial for Pringles called "Stuck In".

== See also ==
- List of Hot Adult Contemporary number ones of 1984
