= 3T =

American R&B/pop music group

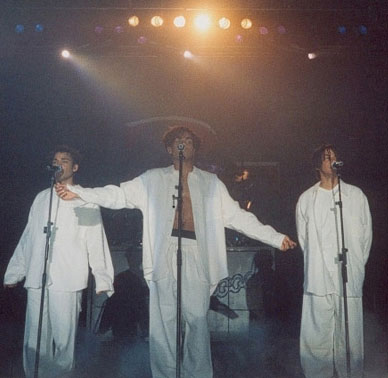
- 3T performing in 1996; From left to right: Taryll, T.J., Taj

Background information
- Origin: Los Angeles, California, U.S.
- Genres: R&B; pop
- Years active: 1994–present
- Labels: Warrior; Sony; Warner Bros.; Epic; MJJ Music; 550
- Members: Taj Jackson; Taryll Jackson; T.J. Jackson
- Website: Official website

3T is an American R&B/pop music trio featuring the three sons of Tito Jackson (from the Jackson 5) and Delores "Dee Dee" Jackson, from whom they inherit their Dominican ancestry. The band members include, from eldest, Tariano Adaryll Jackson II ("Taj") (born August 4, 1973), Taryll Adren Jackson (born August 8, 1975) and Tito Joe Jackson ("T.J.") (born July 16, 1978). Their late uncle Michael Jackson mentored the trio, and signed them to his label MJJ Music.

== History ==
=== Brotherhood (1995–1997) ===
3T released their debut album Brotherhood in 1995. The album sold approximately three million copies worldwide. The group achieved an international hit with their debut single "Anything". 3T released several hit singles in Europe, including "24/7", "Why" (a duet with their uncle Michael Jackson), "I Need You" (with a brief appearance by Michael), "Tease Me" and "Gotta Be You". In 1996, they were ranked second behind the Spice Girls, as the biggest-selling group in Europe. 3T have also written and produced songs for soundtracks to films such as; The Jacksons: An American Dream, Free Willy, Free Willy 2: The Adventure Home, Men in Black and Trippin'. In early 1997, they went on a hugely successful European tour with their album Brotherhood, which included all of the songs from the album, as well as a Jackson 5 tribute (featuring Tito 'Poppa T'), and a surprise performance of the Oasis hit "Wonderwall".

3T completed an album after the release of Brotherhood, with over 20 songs being recorded and 12 planned to be included on the final tracklist. The album was never released by Sony due to a strained relationship with Michael Jackson (MJJ Music), and is considered by many fans to be The Lost Album.

=== Identity (2003–2005) ===
Taryll and T. J. have written and produced tracks for their aunt Janet Jackson as well as for Lindsay Lohan and Bruno Mars. After signing with the French label TF1/NRJ in 2003, 3T continued to perform in France, the Netherlands and Belgium. The group signed with the Dutch label Digidance in 2004 for Dutch releases, appearances, and performances. The album titled Identity was released on March 23, 2004. Two singles were released: "Stuck On You" (a cover of the Lionel Richie song) was released in 2003 in France and Belgium and in 2004 in the Netherlands, and "Sex Appeal" in 2004. Neither single was released outside of Europe. In 2008, 3T made Identity available on both iTunes and amazon.com worldwide.

=== On-and-off appearances (2007–2011) ===
The brothers appeared on the show This Is David Gest in 2007, including recording the theme tune "Crazy Kinda Guy". The show began on April 22, 2007. They appeared in an episode where Gest took cameras for a rare glimpse of the Jackson family house in Encino, California, where he met Tito and 3T as well as matriarch Katherine Jackson, as well as a later episode showing them recording the theme tune. The brothers would occasionally bring Jermajesty on tour as an on and off DJ.

During the summer of 2008, the Jackson family (including Tito) stayed at a holiday let (rental) for six weeks in Appledore, Devon, England while searching for a house to buy in the area. The project was filmed for a Channel 4 documentary called The Jacksons are Coming, which was aired in 2008. Taj and T. J. appear with their father, but Taryll did not join them on the trip. The three family members also attended a Michael Jackson fan event in Devon as part of their stay, ringing him up during the event which led to Michael talking to the fans over a loudspeaker on the phone.

All three of them appeared on the A&E TV show entitled The Jacksons: A Family Dynasty. They appear with their father Tito, who is trying to convince them to relaunch their career.

On January 31, 2010, the three brothers appeared on stage at the 52nd Grammy Awards to support their cousins Prince Michael Jr. and Paris Michael Katherine Jackson as they accepted the Lifetime Achievement Award on behalf of their father, Michael Jackson. On February 1, 2010, all three brothers then appeared in the remake of "We Are the World", this time in aid of the Haiti Appeal. However, they did not sing the main parts of the song and instead contributed to the background vocals. Currently, Taj is working on the Code Z zombie series and a science fiction project called Clone 3. T. J. was selected to play the role of Prince Jean-Luc in the new stage version of Larry Hart's musical Sisterella that was scheduled to premiere in the fall of 2011. Taryll is working on his first solo album that he hopes will make his family and fans proud.

On October 8, 2011, 3T performed at the Michael Forever – The Tribute Concert held at the Millennium Stadium in Cardiff. They performed the Jacksons' track "Heartbreak Hotel" (also known as "This Place Hotel") followed by their own number 2 hit single "Why", which was originally a duet recorded with Michael for their 1995 album Brotherhood. At the end of the performance of "Why", all three brothers broke down into tears. They then appeared in the finale of the show performing Michael's hit "Don't Stop Til You Get Enough" with various other performers from the concert as well as members of the Jackson family who had been in attendance, including Michael's children Prince, Paris and Blanket (Prince II).

=== Charity tour, The Big Reunion and Chapter III (2013–present) ===
After almost two years away from the stage, 3T performed live on stage in Rome, Milan, Torino, and Verona during four charity concerts in Italy from December 5–8. 3T performed a 30-minute show and the setlist featured "Stuck On You", 'Anything', 'I Need You', the new song 'Forever Girl', 'With You', a jam session (Ed Sheeran's 'The A-Team', Oasis' 'Wonderwall' and 'Give Me All Your Lovin') and 'We Are the World'. .

On December 26, 2013, British television station ITV2 announced that 3T would be part of season 2 of The Big Reunion. The episodes were broadcast on ITV2 between February 6 and March 27, 2014. Along with 3T, the other bands that took part were A1, Damage, Eternal, Girl Thing and 5th Story. On February 21 The Big Reunion concert took place in a sold out Hammersmith Apollo in London and was broadcast on ITV2 on March 27, 2014.

On March 20, 2014, it was announced that the boy bands from both series (Five, 911, Blue, A1, 3T, Damage and 5th Story) would go on The Big Reunion Boy Band Tour in October 2014.

On September 27, 2014, 3T performed at a sold-out Back 2 the 90's [sic] event in Rotterdam Ahoy. The next day, on September 28, 2014, 3T were special guests on the popular Dutch TV show Carlo & Irene: Life 4 You. 3T share a special history with Carlo & Irene since they have been guests on their previous TV shows Telekids in 1996 and Carlo & Irene: Life & Cooking in 2003. During their interview on Carlo & Irene: Life 4 You 3T talked about their performance at the Back 2 the 90's [sic] event and performed one of their new songs called "Forever Girl". On September 29, 2014, 3T were guests at dj Giel Beelen on radio NPO 3FM. After their interview with DJ Giel Beelen, 3T performed 'I Need You' live on radio NPO 3FM. 3T also visited DJ One'sy on FunX radio where one lucky fan got the chance to meet Taj, Taryll and T. J. in the studio because she won the meet & greet contest organized by FunX radio. To thank their fans for their continuing support a meet & greet was held later that day at the NH Schiller hotel in Amsterdam.

On March 12, 2015, Dutch radio station Q-music announced 3T would perform at the Foute Party on June 26, 2015. The event took place at the Brabanthallen in 's Hertogenbosch, Netherlands.

On September 16, 2016, 3T had their up Close and Personal in RAI Amsterdam. A surprise concert was held September 17 as well, showcasing the album launch of "Chapter III" at the Melkweg concert venue in Amsterdam, Netherlands

On September 1, 2018, 3T performed their greatest hits at La Cigale, Paris, France. Following this sold-out concert at La Cigale, on May 18 and 19, 2019, 3T returned to Paris, France to perform 2 unplugged shows at the Nouveau Casino de Paris. On August 29, 2018, 3T went to Naples, Italy to honor their uncle Michael Jackson on MJ Day, organized by MJJ Foundation Naples-Onlus. They held a press conference at Gran Teatro - Edenlandia before they performed at Teatro Mediterraneo. On December 16, 2018, 3T performed at La Madeleine in Brussels, Belgium, it had been 20 years since they last performed in Belgium.

On May 7, 2022, 3T performed their biggest hits at "Forever 90" at Zénith in Strasbourg, France.

On August 27, 2022, 3T headlined and performed at one of the biggest dance festivals in Europe, "We Love the 90s" at a sold-out Goffertpark in Nijmegen, Netherlands. The 10th anniversary was originally planned for 2020. The Covid pandemic postponed it twice.

== Taj Jackson's later work ==
Taj directed the short film "Code Z" in 2014, that Big Screen Entertainment Group optioned the rights to. The script was written by Taj and the Brazilian Sco triplets (Thaisa, Thaina, and Thayana Sco) Thayana is Taj's wife.

In 2015, Taj executive produced the reality series The Jacksons: Next Generation. His brothers Taryll and TJ also co-produced the series.

In 2018, Taj directed the music video for 3T's song "Fire".

Taj is now currently working on his forthcoming documentary series called "Righting History" where he will tell his uncle Michael story, saying "This documentary series will conclusively destroy decades of salacious myths which have been told and sold about Michael ad nauseam. In doing so, we will shine a light on the corruption within the media and entertainment industries which conceived and perpetuated them." iHeartRadio reported on January 26, 2019. Taj has been vocal about how the allegations against Michael were false and defamatory. He said he felt betrayed by Wade Robson, who asked him to help get seats for him and his whole family at Michael's 2009 memorial.

== Taryll Jackson's solo career ==
Taryll released his debut solo single "4Ever" on April 5, 2012, from his debut EP, "My Life Without You" which was released on Mother's Day, May 13, 2012, in honor of his mother Dee Dee Jackson. Other songs on this E.P are "My Life Without You", "When You Come Back To Earth", "Doubt", "Be My Girl", "When It Falls Down" and "Unlove You".

On his birthday, August 8, 2012, Taryll released the single "Best of All Time", a tribute to his uncle Michael. The single is taken from his second EP "Undeniable", which was released on August 29, 2012, in honor of Michael. Other songs on this E.P are "Undeniable", "Can't Stop Falling In Love", "Tonight", "Hope", "You Girl", "Dance Floor" and "What Can I Do To Change Your Mind?".

On April 21, 2019, Taryll released the 10 track-album "Crazy Love", and on June 8, 2019, Taryll performed his first solo concert at the Melkweg in Amsterdam, Netherlands. Taryll's father Tito surprised him right before his concert, and later joined him on stage together with Taryll's partner Breana Cabral, and sons Bryce Connor and Adren Michael.

On July 17, 2020, Taryll released the full solo project, "Digital 8". Beyond the original 2012 solo debut EP's "My Life Without You" and "Undeniable", the 50 song-album includes completely remastered songs, special mixes, previously unreleased songs and bonus tracks.

== TJ Jackson's solo career ==
On March 20, 2020, TJ released his debut solo E.P "Obsession" featuring his first single "Insomnia". Other songs on this E.P. are "Obsession", "I Can't Stand It", "I Don't Deserve this" and "#1 Fan". TJ went to Nashville, Tennessee to record and produce the E.P, and he wanted to mix the current urban sound with his 90's R&B roots. On November 20, 2020, TJ released his second E.P "Damaged" which includes the single "Last Night, and two other songs; "Good Time" and "Senseless Drama"

On March 26, 2021, TJ released the first single "Dreamgirl" off his project "Magic Mystery Memories" (MMM). The second single "Secret" was released May 7, and the third single "A Night To Remember" (co-written with Rhyan Shirley and David Thulin) was released July 2. "Secret" was inspired by his uncle Michael, and so was the single's artwork. TJ also wanted to pay homage to the R&B he grew up on with this project.

On May 27, 2022, TJ released his first solo album "Acoustic Sessions 1" a 9 track acoustic album which includes his stripped-down cover of "Human Nature" in honor of his uncle Michael, and on June, 24 he released the single "Heaven on My Lips" (co-written with Sam Tinnesz and David Thulin) the first single from his forthcoming album, "Pressure". On this album TJ wanted to focus on live instrumentation. On June 24 and 26, and July 1, 2022, TJ embarked on his first European solo tour "A Night To Remember" at the Théâtre de la Contrescarpe in Paris, France performing the acoustic versions from the album. TJ's father Tito came to Paris to support him and his wife Frances Jackson, and children Royal, Delores Dior, Dallas and Rio as a surprise. The tour included stops in France, Spain, Italy, England, Belgium, and the Netherlands.

== Reality series (2015–2016) ==
In October 2015, Taj, Taryll and TJ appeared in and co-produced the reality series The Jacksons: Next Generation. The series aired on Lifetime USA and Lifetime Canada (2015), Lifetime UK and Ireland (2016), Lifetime Asia (2016) and Lifetime South Africa (2016).

== Discography ==
=== Studio albums ===
Title	Details	Peak chart positions									
Title	Details	US	AUS	BEL	FRA	GER	NDL	NOR	SWE	SWI	UK
Brotherhood	Released: 1995; Label: MJJ Music	127	22	5	2	30	12	23	25	25	11
Identity	Released: 2004; Label: Digidance	—	—	—	74	—	32	—	—	—	—
Chapter III	Released: 2015; Label: Warrior	—	—	—	—	—	—	—	—	—	—

=== Compilations ===
- 3T Meets the Family of Soul (2005)

=== Singles ===
Year	Title	Peak chart positions										Album
Year	Title	US	AUS	AUT	BEL	GER	IRE	NED	NZ	SWI	UK	Album
1995	"Anything"	15	5	—	13	12	2	4	4	8	2	Brotherhood
1996	"Tease Me"	—	—	—	—	—	—	—	20	—	—	Brotherhood
1996	"24/7"	—	29	—	—	67	—	14	21	32	11	Brotherhood
1996	"Why" (featuring Michael Jackson)	—	46	21	19	29	14	13	9	11	2	Brotherhood
1996	"I Need You"	—	17	—	9	22	14	5	30	9	3	Brotherhood
1997	"Gotta Be You" (featuring Herbie Crichlow)	—	61	—	6	84	—	33	—	—	10	Brotherhood
2003	"Stuck on You"	—	—	—	—	100	—	3	45	32	—	Identity
2004	"Sex Appeal"	—	—	—	7	—	—	27	—	69	—	Identity
2004	"If You Leave Me Now" (featuring T-Rio)	—	—	—	—	—	—	—	—	86	—	Non-album single
2015	"The Story of Love"	—	—	—	—	—	—	—	—	—	—	Chapter III
2015	"Power of Love"	—	—	—	—	—	—	—	—	—	—	Chapter III

=== Other releases ===
- 1992: "You Are the Ones" (appears on The Jacksons: An American Dream mini series' soundtrack)
- 1993: "Didn't Mean to Hurt You" (appears on the Free Willy soundtrack)
- 1995: "What Will It Take" (appears on the Free Willy 2: The Adventure Home soundtrack)
- 1997: "Waiting for Love" (appears on the Men in Black soundtrack)
- 1997: "Endless Christmas" (appears on the Superstars Christmas compilation)
- 1999: "Thinkin'" (appears on the Trippin' soundtrack)

=== Guest appearances ===
Year	Track	Artist	Album
1989	"2300 Jackson Street"	The Jacksons	2300 Jackson Street
1992	"The Dream Goes On" (backing vocal)	Jermaine Jackson	The Jacksons An American Dream soundtrack
1997	"Eternal Flame"	Tomoya Nagase	single
2004	"If You Leave Me Now"	T-Rio	single
2010	"We Are the World 25 for Haiti" (backing vocal)	Artists for Haiti	single
2016	"I Ain't Goin’ Nowhere"	Tito Jackson	TITO Time
2016	"Jammer Street"	Tito Jackson	TITO Time
2016	"So Far So Good"	Tito Jackson	TITO Time
