= Herbie Crichlow =

British music producer and songwriter

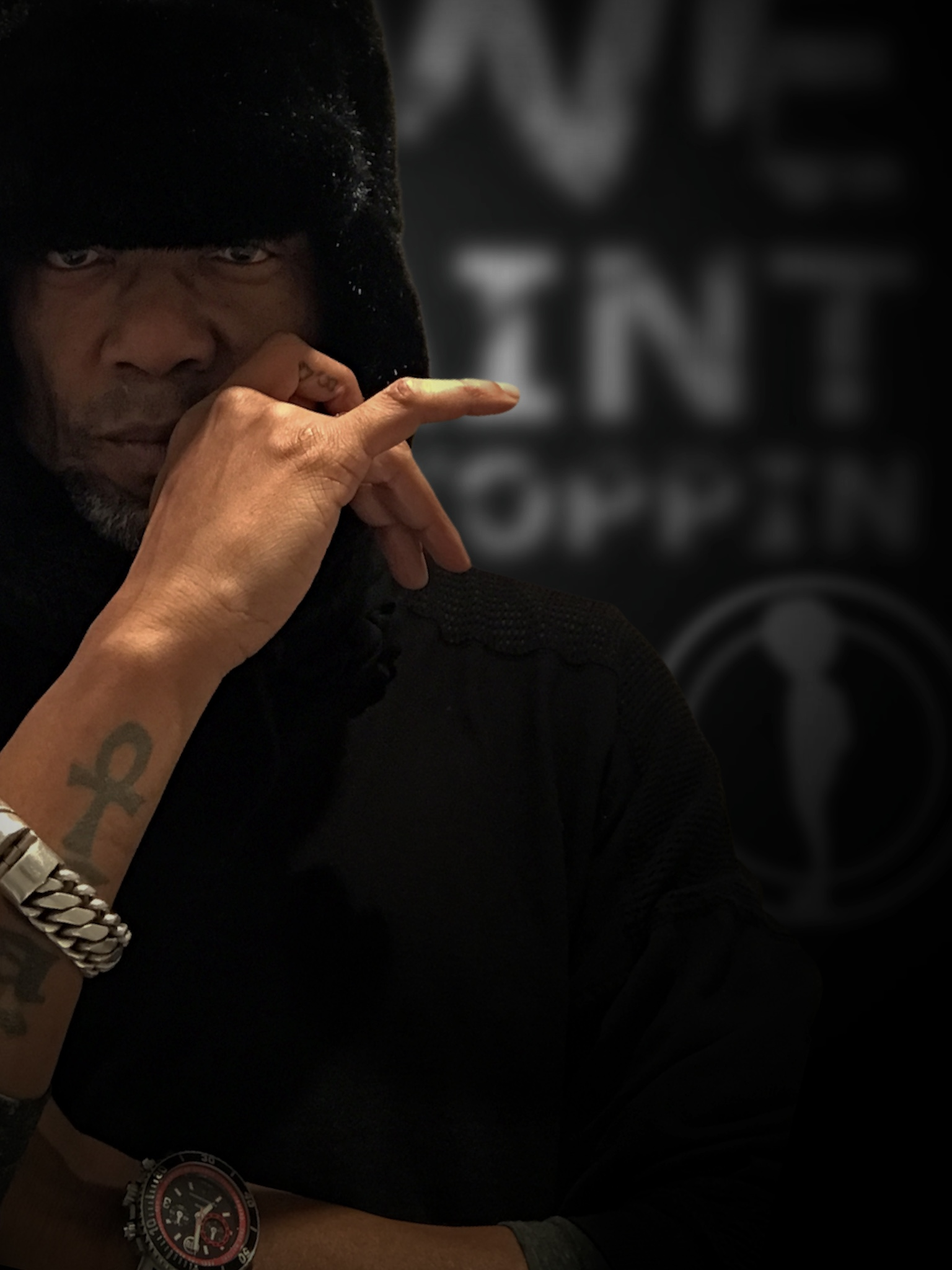
- Herbie Crichlow

Background information
- Born: Herbert St. Clair Crichlow; 26 November 1968 (age 57); England
- Genres: Pop; dance-pop; pop rock; R&B; Europop; Eurodance
- Occupations: Songwriter, producer, singer

Herbert Crichlow (born 26 November 1968) is a British music producer and songwriter based in Sweden. Born in England and raised in Barbados, he is best known for his multiple diamond, platinum and gold awarded works. He is also known for his written collaborations with Max Martin, RedOne, David Franks and Denniz Pop. In 1997, he was awarded the UN Non Violence project Special Award for outstanding works. Crichlow has crafted hits for pop artists such as Backstreet Boys, Zayn Malik, Robyn, Leila K, Rita Ora, Five, amongst many others. His songs have been Grammy Award nominated five times.

== Discography ==
=== Songwriter/producer ===
| Artist | Album | Song |
|---|---|---|
| 3T | Brotherhood | "Gotta Be You" |
| 5ive | | "Everybody Get Up" |
| 5ive | | "It's The Things You Do" |
| 5ive | | "My Song" |
| 5ive | | "Partyline 555-online" |
| 5ive | | "Serious" |
| 5ive | | "Shake" |
| 5ive | | "Slam Dunk (Da Funk)" |
| 5ive | | "Straight up Funk" |
| 5ive | | Official song for the N.B.A 1998 |
| 9Muses | | "Hurt Locker" |
| Abraham Mateo | | "Señorita" |
| Abraham Mateo | | "Who I Am" |
| Afro-dite | | "Surrender" |
| Al Di-meola | | "Shame" feat. Joe |
| Al Di-meola | | "That's the Truth" feat. Angie Stone |
| Alagami | | "Buggin Like Taps" |
| Alexandra Burke | | "Gotta Go" |
| Andy Abrahams | | "All around the world" |
| Backstreet Boys | | "Nobody But You" |
| Backstreet Boys | | "Quit Playing Games with My Heart" |
| Backstreet Boys | | "Show Me The Meaning Of Being Lonely" |
| Backstreet Boys | | "That's The Way I Like It" |
| Backstreet Boys | | "We've Got It Going On" |
| The Baseballs | | "Let it Go" |
| Chuck Anthony | | "Baby Come Back" |
| CLIQ | | "Wavey" feat. Alika |
| CLIQ | | Google Me Feat. Alika & Ms Banks |
| Dana Dragomir | | "One man Woman" |
| Danny Fernandes | | "Overdose" |
| DeDe | | "Party" |
| DeDe | | "What Am I Gonna Do" |
| DeDe | Metaphor | "I'm In Love" |
| DeDe | Metaphor | "Next To your Heart" |
| DeDe | I Do | "My Lover" |
| DeDe | I Do | "Say Say Say" |
| Deep Fried | | "Channel Girl" |
| Drain STH | Freaks Of Nature | "Simon Says" |
| E-Type | Made in Sweden | "Hold Your Horses" |
| E-Type | Made in Sweden | "Me No Want Miseria" |
| Ewa Farna | | " Poznasz mnie, bo to ja" |
| Ewa Farna | | "Nemám na vybranou (I'm in Love)" |
| Ewa Farna | | "Poznasz mnie, bo to ja" |
| Faky | | "Girl Digger" |
| The Fooo Conspiracy | | "Build a girl" |
| The Fooo Conspiracy | | "Fridays are Forever" |
| The Fooo Conspiracy | | "Jump" |
| f(x) | | "Toy" |
| Graaf | Graaf | "You Got What I Want" |
| Hatty Keane | | "In Your Arms" |
| Hatty Keane | | "Pointless" |
| Herbie | | "Silver Surfer" feat. Maja |
| Herbie | | "The Rush" |
| Herbie | | "Hip Hop Hall of Fame" |
| Herbie | | "Zenga Zeng" |
| Herbie | | "Doppelganger" |
| Herbie | | "Calm the FK Down" feat. Ayo the Jitz |
| Herbie | | "Daft Punk Don't Go" |
| Herbie | | "Strong" |
| Herbie | | "Theres nothing like this" |
| Herbie | | "War" |
| Herbie | | "Back in da daze" |
| Herbie | | "Hate me now" Feat, Solo |
| Herbie | Fingers | "Big Funky Dealer" |
| Herbie | Fingers | "Change" |
| Herbie | Fingers | "Come Together" |
| Herbie | Fingers | "Free" |
| Herbie | Fingers | "Gangs to the Max" |
| Herbie | Fingers | "I Believe" |
| Herbie | Fingers | "Jessica" |
| Herbie | Fingers | "Pickit up" |
| Herbie | Fingers | "Rainbow Child" |
| Herbie | Fingers | "Right Type of Mood" |
| Herbie | Fingers | "The Skank" |
| Herbie | The Art of Making Music for the People | |
| Herbie | The Art of Making Music for the People | "Moment of Silence" |
| Herbie | The Art of Making Music for the People | "The Art of Making Music for the People" |
| Herbie | The Art of Making Music for the People | "Dr Funk" |
| Herbie | The Art of Making Music for the People | "Real Talk" |
| Herbie | The Art of Making Music for the People | "Lowriders" |
| Herbie | The Art of Making Music for the People | "Interlude-Find yourself" |
| Herbie | The Art of Making Music for the People | "Interlude-RealTalk" |
| Herbie | The Art of Making Music for the People | "Some of your Loving" |
| Herbie | The Art of Making Music for the People | "Fill my Cup" |
| Herbie | The Art of Making Music for the People | "Outro" |
| Herbie | Connected | |
| Herbie | Connected | "Make em Great" |
| Herbie | Connected | "Retrofunk" |
| Herbie | Connected | "Quantum" |
| Herbie | Connected | "Jab Jab" (J ouvert Morning) |
| Herbie | Connected | "Fly lets fly" |
| Herbie | TO4DV | |
| Herbie | TO4DV | "Only the strong survive" |
| Herbie | TO4DV | "Im Alive" |
| Herbie | TO4DV | "Press rewind" |
| Herbie | TO4DV | "What the hell is this" |
| Igloo | | "Never Gonna Take U Back" feat. River |
| Jane Zhang | | "Together" |
| Jessica Folker | | "Tell Me What You Like" |
| Jessica Folker | | "Tell Me Why" |
| JIMNY | | "Waves" feat. Ruby Prophet |
| Kat De Luna | | "You Are Only Mine " |
| Krishane | | "Inconsiderate" |
| Leila K | Carousel | "Carousel" |
| Leila K | Carousel | "Check the Dan" |
| Leila K | Carousel | "Close Your Eyes" |
| Leila K | Carousel | "Glam" |
| Leila K | Carousel | "Massively Massive" |
| Leila K | Carousel | "Open Sesame" |
| Leila K | Carousel | "Pyramid" |
| Leila K | Carousel | "Slow Motion" |
| Leila K | Manic Panic | "Come on now" |
| Leila K | Manic Panic | "Electric" |
| Leila K | Manic Panic | "Rude Boy" feat. Papa Dee |
| LYSA | | "Lights On" |
| Maja | | "All Night" feat. Herbie |
| Momo Wu | | "My Lips" |
| Makeyouknowlove MYKL | | "Vitamin " |
| Makeyouknowlove MYKL | | "Conversation" |
| Makeyouknowlove MYKL | | "The Highest" |
| Nataliya | | "Gone To Stay" |
| NG3 | | "Holler" |
| NG3 | | "Keep Yo Head Up" |
| NG3 | | "My Way" |
| NG3 | | "Nasty Girls" |
| NG3 | | "Ng3 for Life" |
| NG3 | | "Ooops Up" feat. Snap! |
| NG3 | | "Ready Or Not" |
| NG3 | | "Rumors" |
| NG3 | | "Tainted Love" |
| NG3 | | "The Anthem" |
| Northern Line | | "Run For Your Life" |
| NXTGEN featuring Will I am | | "Embrace" |
| O-Town | | "Sensitive" |
| Private | | "Hell Ain't a Bad Place to Be" |
| Red Velvet | | "Oh Boy" |
| Rita Ora | | "Kiss Me " (Fifty Shades Darker) |
| Robyn | Robyn is Here | "Do You Know (What It Takes)" |
| Shinee | | "Destination" |
| Shinee | | "Like a Fire" |
| Shinee | | "Punch Drunk Love" |
| Southside Rockers | | "Jump" |
| Stan Walker | | "Bully" feat. Herbie Crichlow |
| Stefanie Heinzmann | | "Diggin' in the Dirt" |
| Super Junior | | "Stand Up" |
| Supernatural | | "Closer I get to you" |
| Supernatural | | "Code Red" |
| Supernatural | | "Dance" |
| Supernatural | | "Don’t Pop me Down" |
| Supernatural | | "I'm Gonna Love you" |
| Supernatural | | "Kryptonite" |
| Supernatural | | "Rock U" |
| Supernatural | | "Show me" |
| Supernatural | | "Supernatural" |
| Sweet California | | "GoodLovin" |
| Taeyeon | | "Up & Down" |
| TVXQ | | "Y3K" |
| Ulrich Munther | | "Crash test Dummies" |
| W-ind | | "Candle Light" |
| W-ind | | "Midnight Venus" |
| Waldo's People | | "Bounce" |
| Zayn | | "TiO" |
| Zayn | | "Good Years" |
| Zayn | | "Common" |

== Awards ==
- Most played song of the year 1997 ASCAP Award winner
- Most played song of the year 1998 ASCAP Award winner
- Most played song of the year 1999 ASCAP Award winner
- Most played song of the year 2001 ASCAP Award winner
