= Tito Jackson =

American musician (1953–2024)

- Jackson in 1984
- Born: Tariano Adaryll Jackson; October 15, 1953; Gary, Indiana, U.S.
- Died: September 15, 2024 (aged 70); Gallup, New Mexico, U.S.
- Burial place: Forest Lawn Memorial Park, Hollywood Hills, California, U.S.
- Occupations: Musician; singer; songwriter
- Years active: 1964–2024
- Spouses: Dee Dee Martes (m. 1972; div. 1988) Mizuki Matsui (m. 2020)
- Children: 4, including Taj
- Parents: Joe Jackson; Katherine Jackson
- Family: Jackson family
- Musical career
- Genres: Pop; R&B; soul; blues; rock
- Instruments: Vocals; guitar; synthesizers
- Labels: Steeltown; Motown; PIR; Epic; CBS
- Formerly of: Jackson 5; The Jacksons
- Website: https://www.titojackson.com

Tariano Adaryll "Tito" Jackson (October 15, 1953 – September 15, 2024) was an American musician, singer and songwriter. He was a founding member of the Jackson 5 (later known as the Jacksons), a group who rose to fame in the late 1960s and 1970s with the Motown label and had continued success on the Epic label in the late 1970s and 1980s.

Tito and Jackie Jackson were the most consistently present members of the Jacksons, with Jermaine, Marlon, Michael, and Randy leaving at different times. After the end of the Victory Tour, Tito performed session work and as a record producer. In 2001, Tito reunited with his brothers on Michael's 30th anniversary concert special at Madison Square Garden.

Tito began a solo career in 2003 performing as a blues musician. He was nominated for a Grammy Award three times, and was inducted into the Rock and Roll Hall of Fame as a member of the Jackson 5.

== Early life ==
Tariano Adaryll Jackson was born on October 15, 1953, at St. Mary's Mercy Hospital in Gary, Indiana. He was the third of ten children of the Jackson family: Rebbie, Jackie, Jermaine, La Toya, Marlon, Brandon (1957–1957), Michael (1958–2009), Randy, and Janet, who lived in a two-bedroom house in Gary. His father, Joseph (July 26, 1928 – June 27, 2018), was a steel mill worker and played R&B in a band, the Falcons, with his brother Luther. His mother, Katherine (May 4, 1930), is a Jehovah's Witness and played the piano, cello, and clarinet. At 10 years of age, Tito was caught playing his father's guitar after breaking a string. After fixing the string, Joe demanded that he play for him. Once he finished, Joe bought him his own guitar and encouraged Tito, Jackie, and Jermaine to form a singing group. He was impressed with Jackie and Jermaine's vocals.

By 1964, Marlon and Michael joined the group, the Jackson 5, after Katherine discovered that they could sing. A country-and-western fan, she sang harmonies with her sons. Before Motown signed them, the brothers spent years rehearsing at home. After school, they rehearsed for hours, played a gig, did homework, and went to bed.

== Career ==
=== The Jackson 5 ===
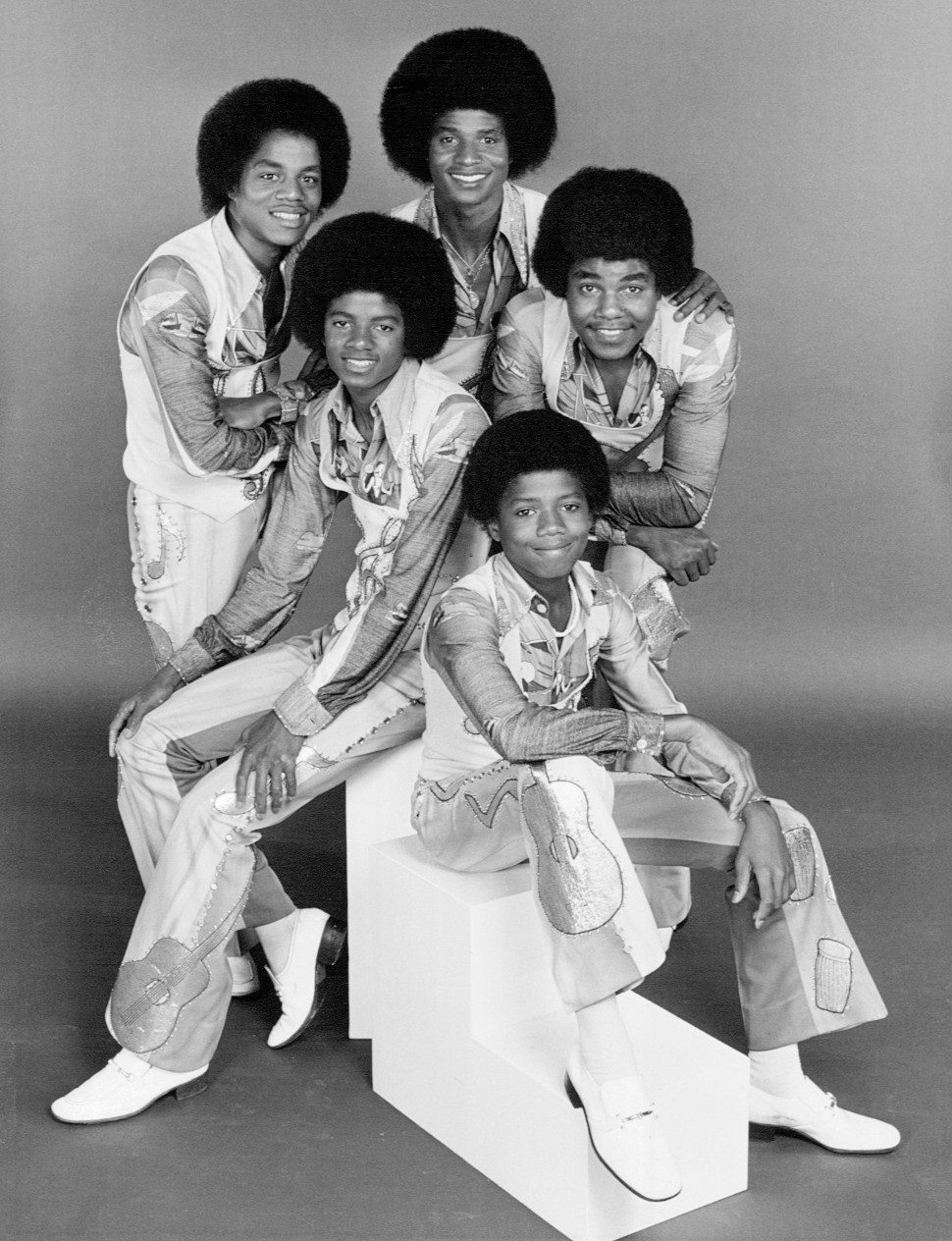
Tito Jackson (2nd row, right) with the Jacksons in 1976

After first performing in school functions and supermarkets, the brothers began participating in local talent shows when Tito was twelve. By then, his younger brother Michael, then seven, had become the official lead singer of the group. In 1965, they changed their name from the Jackson Brothers to the Jackson Five, and won several talent shows around the Gary area. After winning the Amateur Night competition for the Apollo Theater in August 1967, Joe Jackson began to work part-time at the steel mill to help his sons secure a recording contract. The group signed with Steeltown Records in Gary in November of that year. In January 1968, the Jackson Five's first single, "Big Boy", was released on the Steeltown label.

In July 1968, The Jackson 5 signed with Motown Records in Detroit, and scored several hit songs, including their number-one singles "I Want You Back", "ABC", "The Love You Save", and "I'll Be There", but despite his talent as a guitar player, Motown refused to allow Tito perform guitar on any of the Jackson 5 recording sessions, instead forcing all their guitar parts to be performed by session musicians. As a direct result, his guitar work did not make its debut until he and the Jacksons left Motown for CBS Records in 1976.

He began writing songs with his brothers during this time. Tito and Jackie Jackson were the most consistently present members of the Jacksons, with Jermaine, Marlon, Michael, and Randy leaving at different times. After the end of the Victory Tour, Tito performed session work and as a record producer. After releasing 2300 Jackson Street, the Jacksons ceased recording work. Tito was inducted with his brothers into the Rock and Roll Hall of Fame in 1997.

In 2001, Tito reunited with his brothers on Michael's 30th anniversary concert special at Madison Square Garden.

=== Solo work and other projects ===
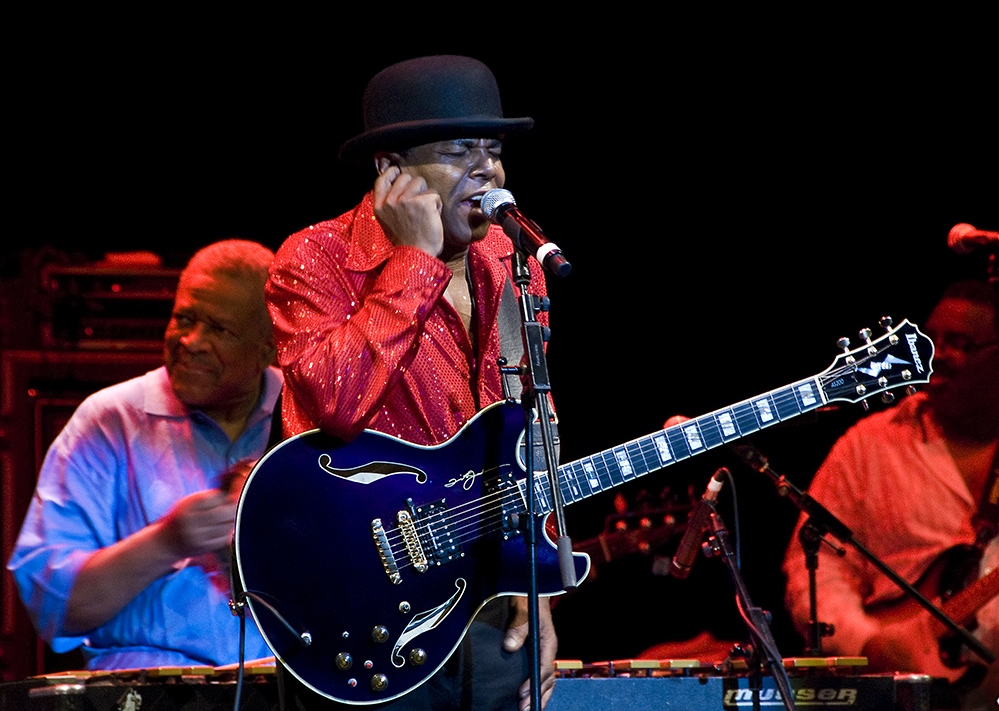
Jackson in 2009

Tito began a solo career in 2003 performing as a blues musician in various clubs with his band, which included producer and guitarist Angelo Earl, and a management team that included Ed Tate. In 2007, in the United Kingdom, Jackson appeared as a judge on the BBC celebrity singing competition Just the Two of Us for series two of the show. He replaced singer Lulu, who was a judge on series one. His co-judges were vocal coach CeCe Sammy, musician Stewart Copeland, and radio DJ Trevor Nelson. In 2009, he was the executive producer of The Jacksons: A Family Dynasty, together with his brothers after Michael died.

In 2016, he had his first commercially successful solo single on the Billboard charts with the single, "Get It Baby", featuring Big Daddy Kane from his album Tito Time becoming the ninth and final Jackson family sibling to place a solo single on the charts. The album was released in Japan late in 2016, and in the U.S. on iTunes in April 2017. Subsequent to its launch, three singles were released to radio in the United States. The first single, "When the Magic Happens", featuring Jocelyn Brown, was released on April 1, 2017. Jackson launched the album for the UK market in September 2017.

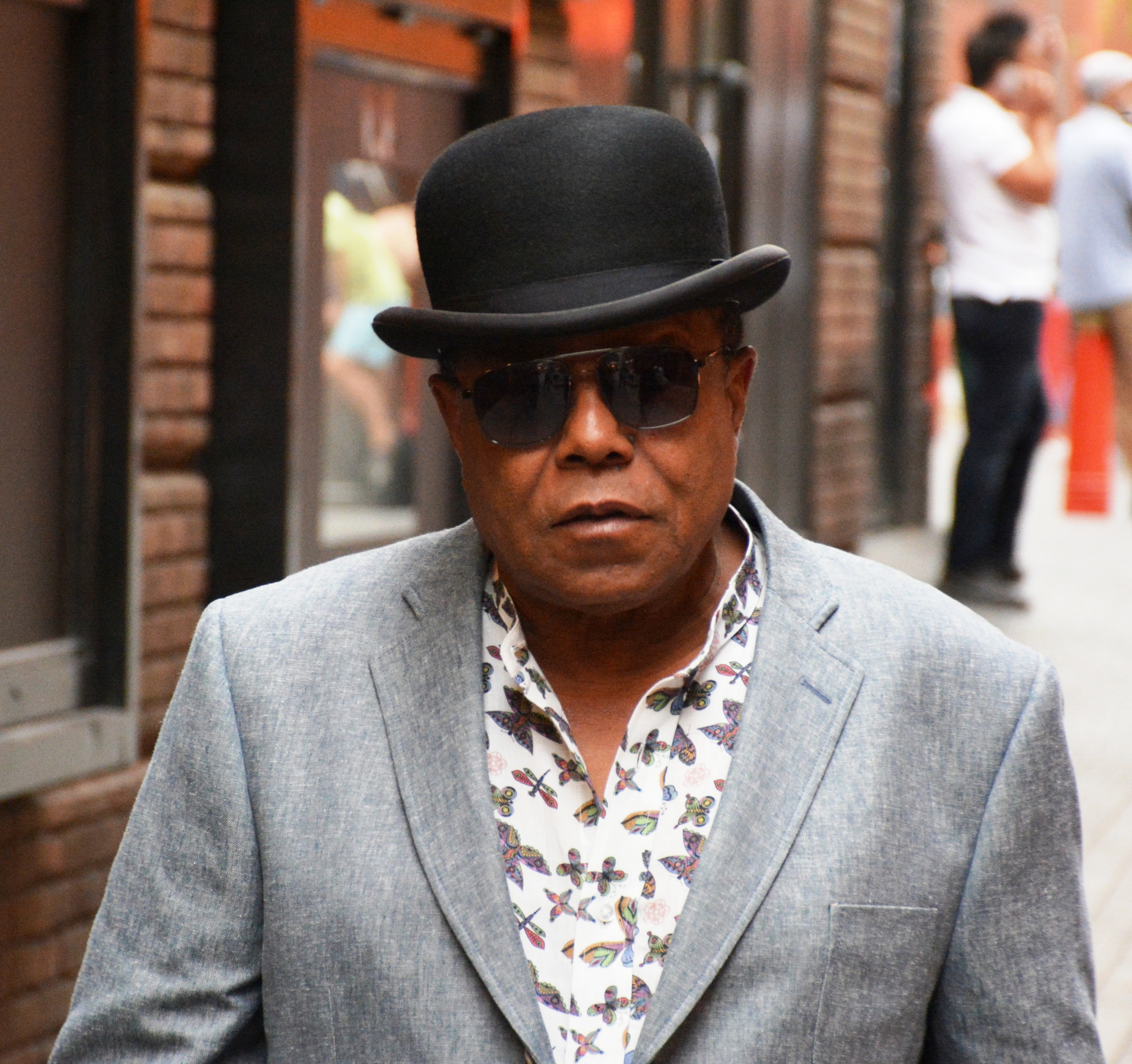
Jackson in 2017

Tito performed at the 2019 Living Legends foundation's (LLF) Annual Awards Dinner and Gala, performing his single "One Way Street" off his album Tito Time. "One Way Street" features a remix from producer Gregg Pagani, who has worked with Charlie Wilson and Johnny Gill.

On July 9, 2021, Tito released the first single "Love One Another" from his second solo album Under Your Spell, released August 6. The single features his brother Marlon Jackson, Kenny Neal, Bobby Rush, and Stevie Wonder. On this album he turned to blues compared to his debut album, Tito Time, which explored more pop and R&B sounds. The album Under Your Spell also featured collaborations with George Benson, rock guitarist Joe Bonamassa, Grady Champion, Claudette King, The O'Jay's Eddie Levert, and Steven Powell.

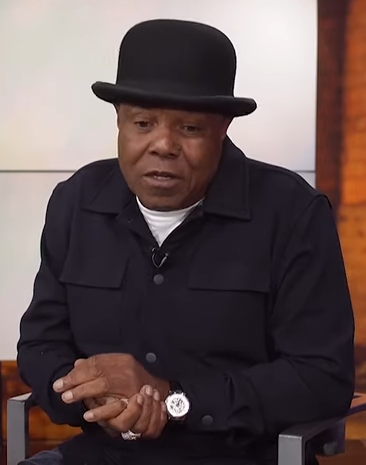
Jackson in 2019

On September 16, 2022, Tito took the stage at Ground Zero Blues Club in Biloxi, Mississippi together with Kenny Neal. This was their second show from their "Straight From The Heart Tour". First show was on August 27 at Winston-Salem Fairgrounds Annex in Winston-Salem, North Carolina.Third show was on September 23, in Bogalusa, Louisiana at the Bogalusa Blues and Heritage Festival.

On March 17, 2023, Tito teamed up with Brazilian artist Natalia Damini bringing the Motown and the early Jacksons feel back with a new song "Attitude", and a music video. This collaboration came to be because Jackson's long time friend Charve the Don is also Damini's manager.

== Personal life and death ==
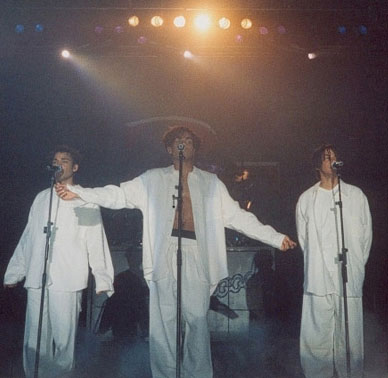
Taryll, TJ, and Taj Jackson

In June 1972, Tito married Delores "Dee Dee" Martes at the age of 18, and the couple divorced in 1988. In 1994, Martes was found dead, floating in a swimming pool. The death was originally ruled accidental. Later, Los Angeles businessman Donald Bohana, who was dating Martes at the time, was charged with and, in 1998, found guilty of second-degree murder. The couple had three sons—Taj (b. 1973), Taryll (b. 1975), and TJ (b. 1978)—who comprise the R&B/pop group 3T. Jackson had nine grandchildren.

Michael Jackson's memorial service was held at the Staples Center on July 7, 2009, in Los Angeles. To honor him, Tito and his brothers Marlon, Jackie, Jermaine, and Randy served as pallbearers, each wearing a single spangled white glove and sunglasses. On the 12th anniversary of Michael's death, Jackson told Manchester Evening News that he turned to Michael's music in remembrance of his brother. In the 2021 interview, Jackson said that the month of June was difficult for him because of his brother's death. He also defended his brother against child molestation allegations.

On September 15, 2024, Tito suffered a fatal heart attack in Gallup, New Mexico. He was on a road trip with his business partner Terry Harvey to transport Tito's antique cars from California to his new residence in Claremore, Oklahoma, when he began sweating and complaining of chest pains. His last words to Harvey were "I ain't feeling good in my chest." Gallup police stated they were alerted to Jackson being in need of medical attention near a mall before he was taken by ambulance to a local hospital, where he was pronounced dead at the age of 70.

Following Tito's death, it was revealed that he had a daughter named Tariana Katherine, born in March 2020 with Mizuki Matsui.

On November 4, 2024, Tito was buried in a private family garden in Forest Lawn Memorial Park in Hollywood Hills, following a memorial service attended by family members and friends at Forest Lawn Memorial Park in Glendale, where his brother Michael and father Joe are also buried.

The 2026 biopic Michael, about his younger brother (in which Tito is portrayed by Judah Edwards and Rhyan Hill) was dedicated to his memory.

== Discography ==
=== Studio albums ===
List of studio albums, with selected details
Title	Album details	Ref
Tito Time	Released December 21, 2016; Label: Play It Right Music; Formats: CD, digital download	
Under Your Spell	Released August 6, 2021; Label: Gulf Coast / Hillside Global; Formats: CD, vinyl, digital download	

=== Singles ===
List of singles, with selected peak chart positions
Title	Year	Peak chart positions	Album
Title	Year	US Adult R&B	Album
"Get It Baby" (featuring Big Daddy Kane)	2016	20	Tito Time
"When the Magic Happens"	2017	—	Tito Time
"One Way Street"	2017	29	Tito Time
"We Made It"	2018	—	Tito Time
"Love One Another"	2021	—	Under Your Spell
"—" denotes items which were not released in that country or failed to chart.

=== Streaming ===
In 2021, Jackson released "Make Your Mind Up", a collaboration with EEDB and Toni Tuklan, featuring Kaos Mc And Duendy Primeiro.
