= Anything (3T song) =

1995 single by 3T

Single by 3T

from the album Brotherhood
- B-side: "What Will It Take"
- Released: August 27, 1995
- Genre: Soul; R&B
- Length: 5:21 (album version); 4:24 (single edit)
- Label: MJJ; 550 Music
- Songwriters: Taj Jackson; Taryll Jackson; T. J. Jackson
- Producer: 3T

3T singles chronology
"Anything" (1995)	"24/7" (1995)

Music video
- "Anything" on YouTube

"Anything" is a song written and recorded by American R&B trio 3T, released by label MJJ as the first single from their debut album, Brotherhood (1995). The song peaked at number two on the UK Singles Chart and number 15 on the US Billboard Hot 100. It received a gold certification on January 26, 1996.

== Critical reception ==
Gil L. Robertson IV from Cash Box named "Anything" a "standout track" of the Brotherhood album. Connie Johnson from Los Angeles Times felt the trio's potential is best realized on the song, describing it as "a ballad so yearningly tender that it makes the rest of the album pale by comparison." James Masterton for Dotmusic viewed it as "a perfectly creditable soul record". Alan Jones from Music Week wrote, "Though they had the obvious advantage of having Michael Jackson as an uncle, 3T's debut single "Anything" would have been a hit regardless." Helen Lamont from Smash Hits gave the single two out of five, calling it "another ever-so-pleasant, ever-so-bland swingbeat "classic"."

== Track listings ==
- CD single
1. "Anything" (single edit with acappella intro) – 4:24
2. "What Will It Take" – 5:16
- CD maxi
1. "Anything" (single edit with acappella intro) – 4:24
2. "Anything" (Cool Out urban Mix) – 4:00
3. "Anything" (2B3 Street Level mix) – 4:32
4. "Anything" (2B3 instrumental mix) – 4:33
5. "Anything" (Misty funk mix) – 4:22
6. "Anything" (Cory's R&B smooth mix) – 3:50
- 12-inch maxi
1. "Anything" (2B3 Street Level mix) – 4:32
2. "Anything" (2B3 instrumental mix) – 4:33
3. "Anything" (single edit with acappella intro) – 4:24
4. "Anything" (Misty funk mix) – 4:22
5. "Anything" (Cool Out urban mix) – 4:00
6. "Anything" (Cory's R&B smooth mix) – 3:50

== Charts ==
=== Weekly charts ===
Chart (1996)	Peak position
Australia (ARIA)	5
Belgium (Ultratop 50 Flanders)	13
Belgium (Ultratop 50 Wallonia)	9
Denmark (IFPI)	6
Europe (Eurochart Hot 100)	8
Europe (European AC Radio)	16
Europe (European Dance Radio)	1
Europe (European Hit Radio)	6
Europe (Atlantic Crossovers)	3
France (SNEP)	6
France Airplay (SNEP)	8
Germany (GfK)	12
Iceland (Íslenski Listinn Topp 40)	31
Ireland (IRMA)	2
Israel (Israeli Singles Chart)	17
Netherlands (Dutch Top 40)	5
Netherlands (Single Top 100)	4
New Zealand (Recorded Music NZ)	4
Norway (VG-lista)	3
Spain Airplay (Top 40 Radio)	9
Sweden (Sverigetopplistan)	2
Switzerland (Schweizer Hitparade)	8
UK Singles (Official Charts)	2
UK Airplay (Music Week)	4
US Billboard Hot 100	15
US Top 40/Mainstream (Billboard)	18
US Top 40/Rhythm-Crossover (Billboard)	7
Zimbabwe (ZIMA)	6

=== Year-end charts ===
Chart (1996)	Position
Australia (ARIA)	31
Belgium (Ultratop 50 Flanders)	46
Belgium (Ultratop 50 Wallonia)	25
Europe (Eurochart Hot 100)	21
Europe (European Hit Radio)	26
Europe (Atlantic Crossovers)	15
France (SNEP)	38
Germany (Media Control)	51
Netherlands (Dutch Top 40)	11
Netherlands (Single Top 100)	25
New Zealand (RIANZ)	23
Sweden (Topplistan)	32
Switzerland (Schweizer Hitparade)	21
UK Singles (OCC)	20
US Billboard Hot 100	43

== Certifications ==
Region	Certification	Certified units/sales
Australia (ARIA)	Gold	35,000^{^}
France (SNEP)	Silver	125,000^{*}
Norway (IFPI Norway)	Gold	
United Kingdom (BPI)	Gold	400,000^{^}
United States (RIAA)	Gold	700,000
^{*} Sales figures based on certification alone.^{^} Shipments figures based on certification alone.

== Release history ==
Region	Date	Format(s)	Label(s)	Ref(s).
United States	August 27, 1995	—N/a	MJJ; 550 Music	
United States	September 12, 1995	Rhythmic contemporary radio	MJJ; 550 Music	
United States	October 24, 1995	Contemporary hit radio	MJJ; 550 Music	
United Kingdom	January 15, 1996	CD; cassette	MJJ; 550 Music; Epic	
