= 1973 in music =

This is a list of music-related events in 1973.

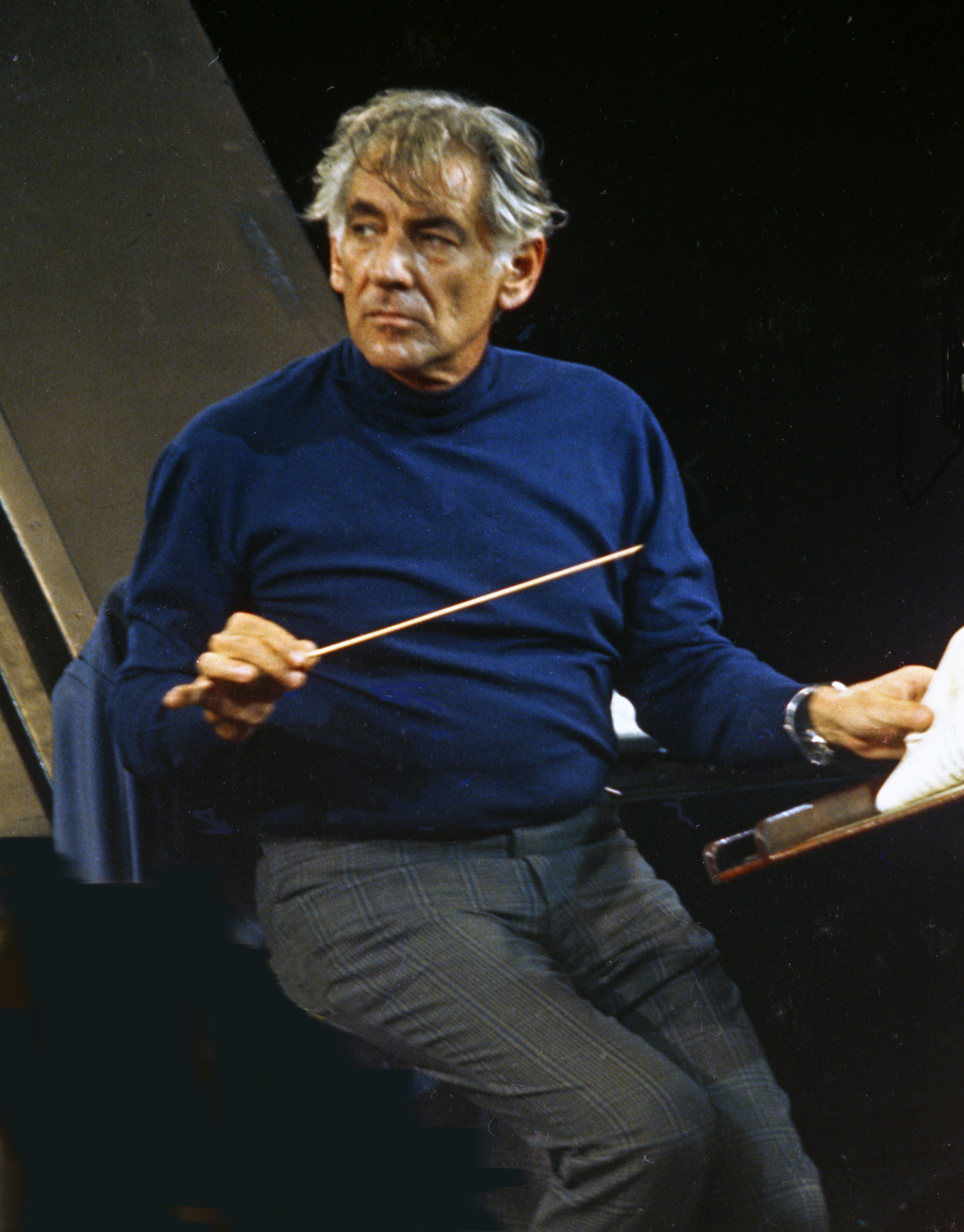
Leonard Bernstein in 1973

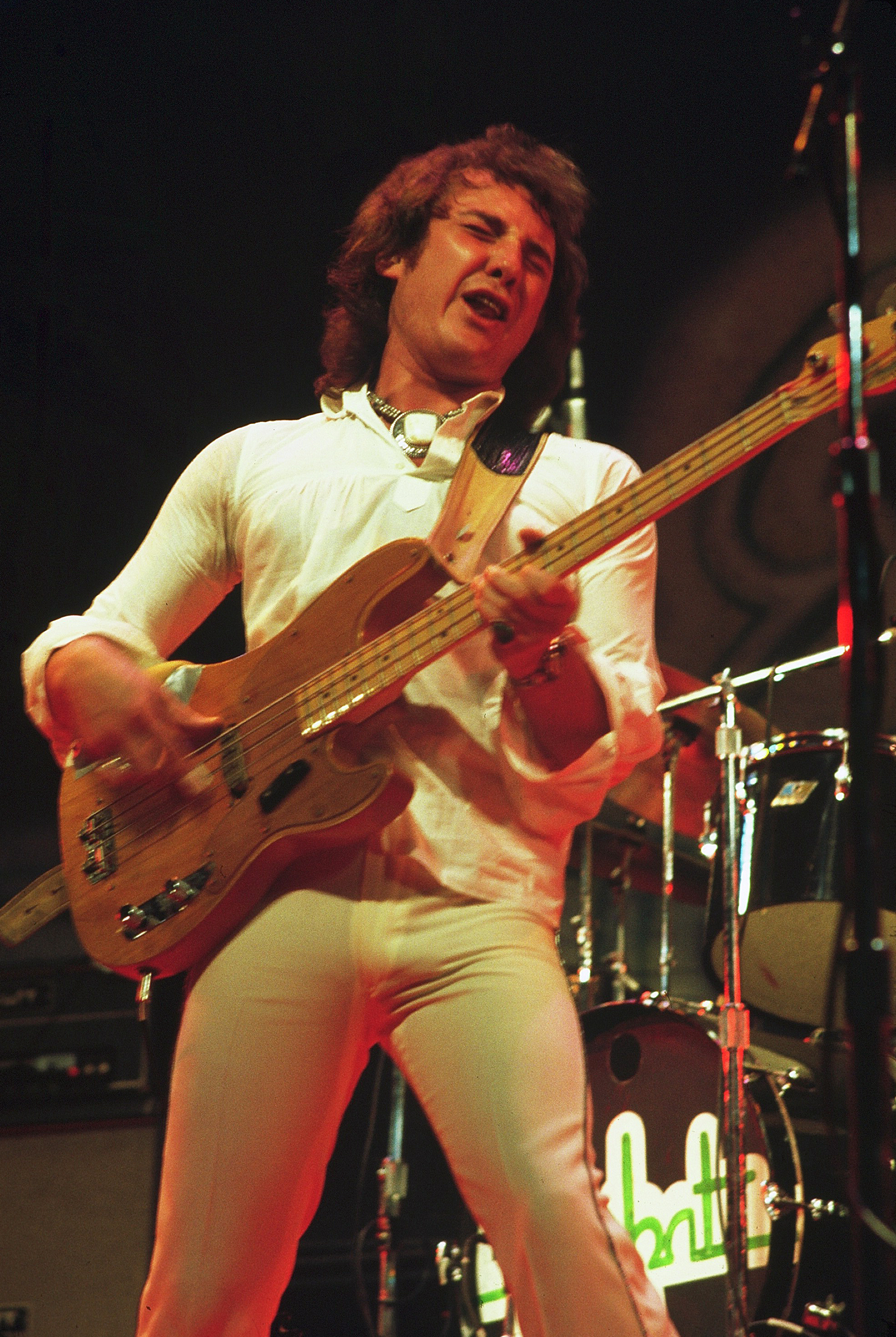
Foghat's Tony Stevens in 1973

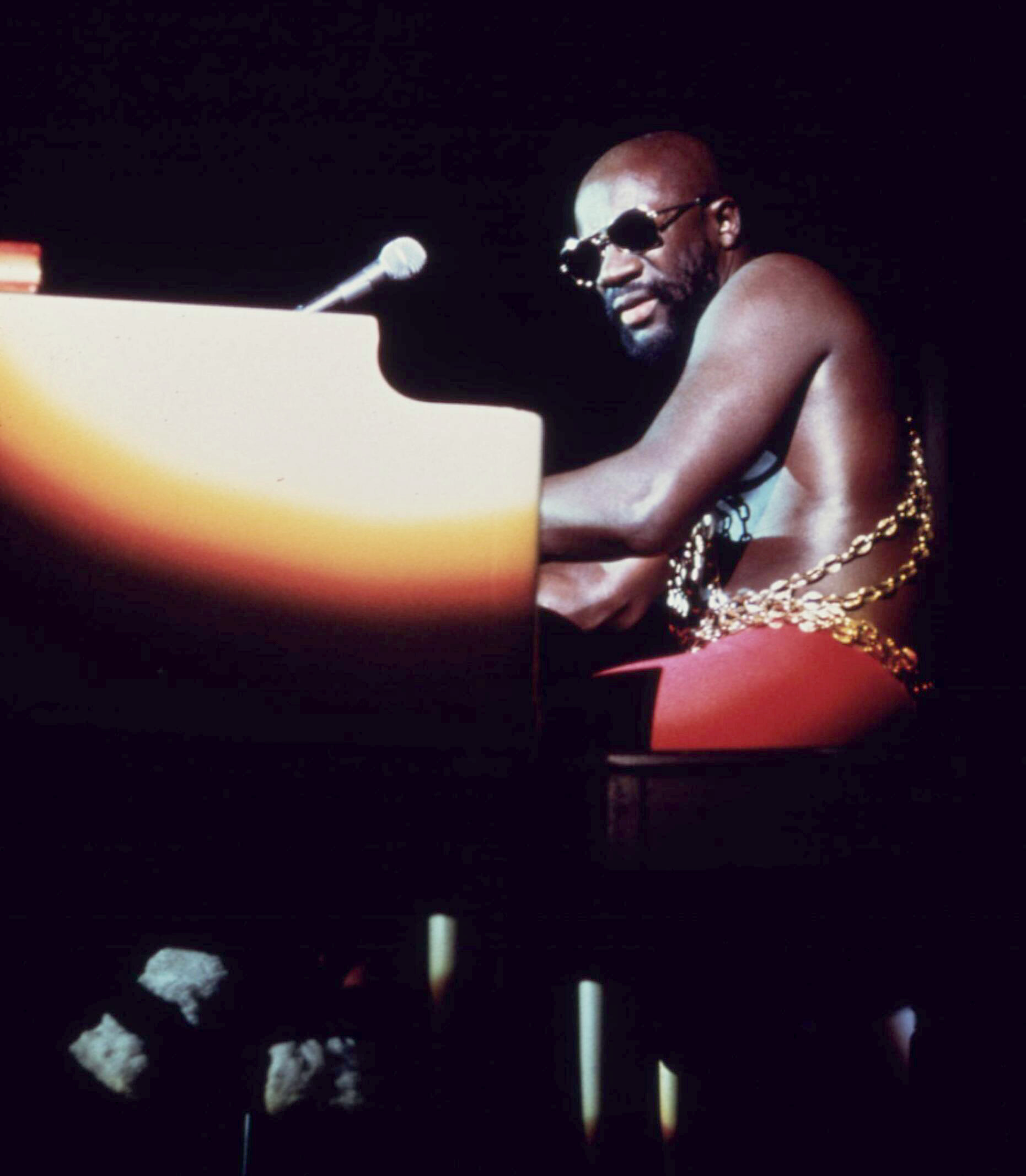
Isaac Hayes in 1973

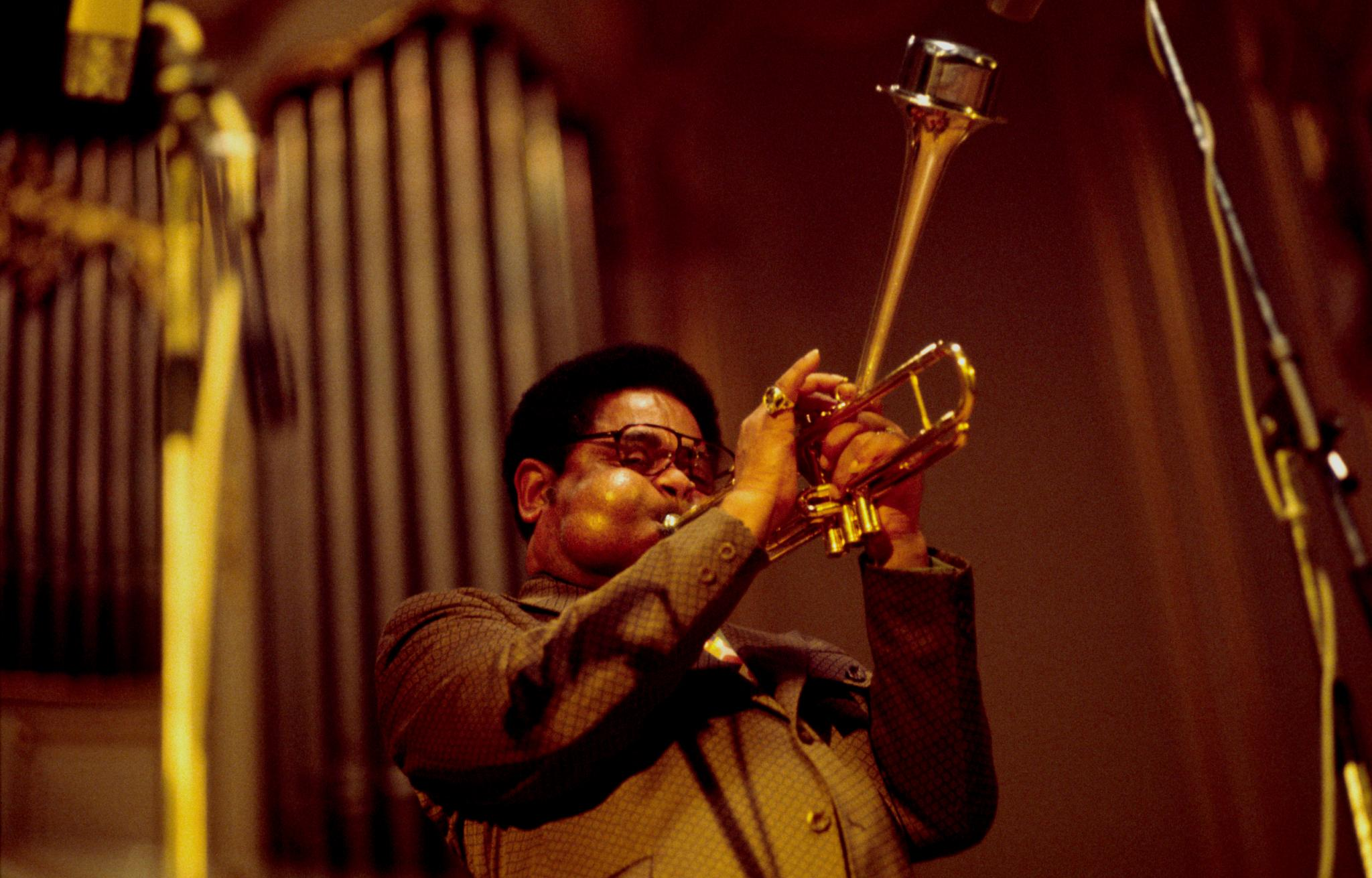
Dizzy Gillespie in 1973

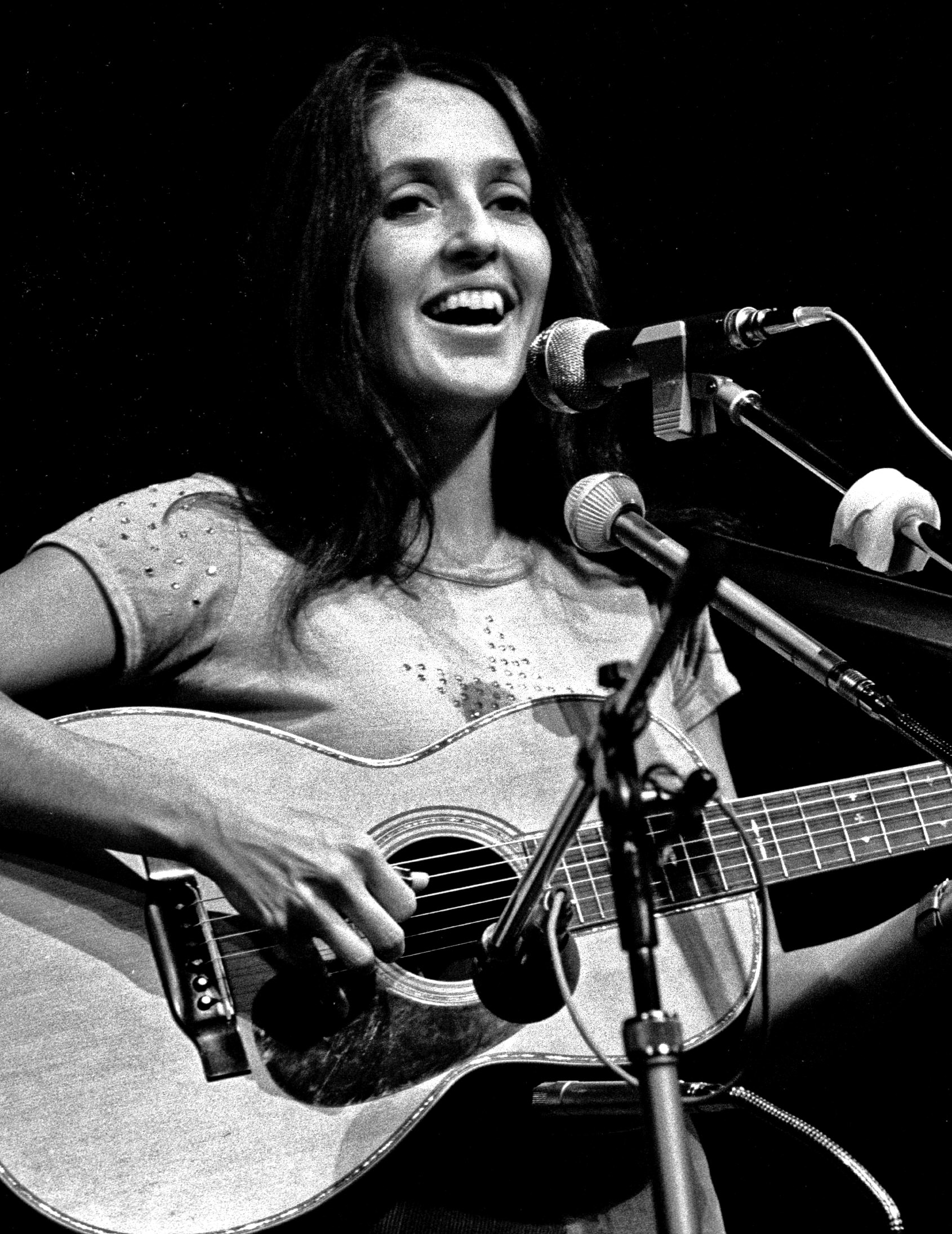
Joan Baez in 1973

== Specific locations ==
- 1973 in British music
- 1973 in Japanese music
- 1973 in Norwegian music
- 1973 in Scandinavian music

== Specific genres ==
- 1973 in country music
- 1973 in heavy metal music
- 1973 in jazz
- 1973 in progressive rock

== Events ==
=== January–April ===
- January 8 – British Rail authorities restrict Pipe Major Gordon Speirs to playing his bagpipes just one minute in every fifteen on Liverpool Street station, London, on grounds that his playing (part of a holiday campaign by the Scottish Tourist Board) "interferes with station business".
- January 9 – Mick Jagger's request for a Japanese visa is rejected on account of a 1969 drug conviction, putting an abrupt end to The Rolling Stones' plans to perform in Japan during their forthcoming tour.
- January 13 - The Sweet release "Block Buster!", their only number one hit in the UK. It stays at the top of the charts for 5 weeks. This is one of the first Glam hits of the decade. The Sweet follow this up with 3 straight number 2 singles: "Hell Raiser", "The Ballroom Blitz" and "Teenage Rampage".
- January 14
  - Elvis Presley's Aloha From Hawaii Via Satellite television special is broadcast in over 40 countries around the world.
  - Grateful Dead bassist Phil Lesh is arrested for drug possession at his Marin County home.
- January 18 – The Rolling Stones' benefit concert for Nicaraguan earthquake victims raises over $350,000. On December 22, 1972, an earthquake destroyed Managua, the capital of Nicaragua.
- January 21 – The Rolling Stones open their Pacific tour of Hawaii, Australia and New Zealand in Honolulu, Hawaii.
- January 30 – Kiss perform their first concert, at the Coventry Club in Queens, New York City, United States.
- February 2 – The Midnight Special makes its début as a regular series on US TV channel NBC. Helen Reddy is the featured artist.
- February 14 – David Bowie collapses from exhaustion after a performance at New York's Madison Square Garden.
- February 18 – The King Biscuit Flower Hour is first broadcast with performances by Blood, Sweat & Tears, The Mahavishnu Orchestra, and new artist Bruce Springsteen.
- March 1
  - Leonard Bernstein conducts Pyotr Ilyich Tchaikovsky's Violin Concerto for the first time in his career, with soloist Isaac Stern and the New York Philharmonic Orchestra.
  - The Joffrey Ballet's Deuce Coupe Ballet opens. The ballet is set entirely to music by The Beach Boys.
  - Pink Floyd releases The Dark Side of the Moon, which goes on to become one of the best-selling albums of all time. The album debuts on the Billboard 200 on March 17, reaches #1 on April 28, and eventually logs the all-time record of 741 weeks on that chart. Sleeve design is by Hipgnosis.
- March 5 – Jimi Hendrix's former personal manager, Michael Jeffery, is killed in a plane crash while travelling from Majorca to England; no passengers survive.
- March 6 – The New York Office of the US Immigration Department cancels John Lennon's visa extension five days after granting it.
- March 7 – The director of talent acquisition at Columbia Records, John H. Hammond, suffers a non-fatal heart attack following a performance by one of his most recent finds, Bruce Springsteen.
- March 8 – Paul McCartney is fined $240 after pleading guilty to charges of growing marijuana outside his Scottish farm.
- March 14 – The singers Stephen Stills and Véronique Sanson are married near Guildford, England.
- March 24 – Lou Reed is bitten on the buttocks by a fan during a concert in Buffalo, New York.
- April 2 – Capitol Records releases two collections of The Beatles' greatest hits, The Beatles 1962-1966 and The Beatles 1967-1970 (commonly referred to as the "Red Album" and the "Blue Album", respectively).
- April 7 – In Luxembourg City, the 18th Eurovision Song Contest is won by Luxembourg for the second consecutive year, this time with "Tu te reconnaîtras", sung by Anne-Marie David. Spain finish in second place with "Eres Tú", sung by Mocedades; the United Kingdom finish third with Cliff Richard singing "Power to All Our Friends". The top three placed songs become international hits.
- April 8 – Opening of the first La Rochelle Festival of Contemporary Music, under the direction of Claude Samuel. Featured composers include Karlheinz Stockhausen and Iannis Xenakis
- April 15 – Tenth Royan Festival of International Contemporary Art begins, including concerts featuring music by Jean Barraqué and Horațiu Rădulescu, amongst others.
- April 16 – Paul McCartney's first solo television special, James Paul McCartney, airs on ABC. The special includes performances by McCartney and Wings.
- April 18 – Violinist Jascha Heifetz deposits parts from his prized Guarnerius violin in the newly poured wet concrete of the foundation for the new Virginia Ramo Hall of Music, under construction at the University of Southern California, United States, in order to ensure the building will be "in tune", and to bring luck.

=== May–August ===
- May 4 – July 29 – Led Zeppelin embarks on a tour of the United States, during which they set the record for highest attendance for a concert, 56,800, at the Tampa Stadium in Tampa, Florida. The record was previously held by The Beatles. Performances for the movie The Song Remains the Same are also filmed.
- May 9 – Mick Jagger adds $150,000 of his own money to the $350,000 raised by The Rolling Stones' January 18 benefit concert for the victims of the Nicaraguan earthquake.
- May 12 – David Bowie is the first rock artist to perform at Earls Court Exhibition Centre in London.
- May 13 – Daniel Barenboim collapses with a gastric upset during a concert at the Brighton Festival in England, but later had sufficiently recovered to be driven home.
- May 19 – Première of Havergal Brian's Symphony No. 2 in E minor at the Brighton Dome, performed by the Kensington Symphony Orchestra conducted by Leslie Head.
- May 23 – Don Robey sells Duke Records, Peacock Records and Backbeat Records to ABC Dunhill Records.
- May 25 – Mike Oldfield's Tubular Bells becomes the first release on Richard Branson's newly launched Virgin label in the UK.
- June 1 - Robert Wyatt falls three storeys from a London apartment block, becoming paralized from the waist down. After a six-month stay in hospital, where he composes the material for his Rock Bottom album, he continues his musical career using a wheelchair.
- June 4 – Ronnie Lane plays his last show with Faces at the Edmonton Sundown in London. Lane had informed the band three weeks earlier that he was quitting.
- June 15 – The first Istanbul International Music Festival opens.
- June 16 – Benjamin Britten's opera Death in Venice, receives its première at Snape Maltings in the UK.
- June 29 – The Scorpions play their first gig with Uli Roth at a festival in Vechta, Germany. Roth was originally intended as a temporary replacement for Michael Schenker, who had just been snapped up by U.F.O. earlier in the month.
- July 3 – David Bowie 'retires' his stage persona Ziggy Stardust in front of a shocked audience at the Hammersmith Odeon in London at the end of his British tour.
- July 4 – Slade drummer Don Powell is critically injured in a car crash in Wolverhampton; his 20-year-old girlfriend is killed. With his life in danger, the band's future is left in the balance. Powell recovers after surgery, and is able to join the band ten weeks later in New York, to record "Merry Xmas Everybody".
- July 13 – The Everly Brothers break up after Phil Everly smashes his guitar on the floor midway through their final show together.
- July 15 – Ray Davies of The Kinks makes an emotional outburst during a performance at White City Stadium in London, announcing he is quitting the group. He later recants the statement.
- July 28 – Summer Jam at Watkins Glen rock festival in New York (state) is attended by 600,000, who see The Allman Brothers Band, The Band and the Grateful Dead.
- July 30 – Soviet officials grant permission for Gennadi Rozhdestvensky to accept a three-year appointment as chief conductor of the Stockholm Philharmonic Orchestra, the first time a Soviet orchestra conductor has been allowed to take up such a position outside of the Eastern Bloc.
- August 6 – Stevie Wonder is seriously injured in a car accident outside Durham, North Carolina, spending the next four days in a coma.
- August 11 – DJ Kool Herc originates the hip-hop genre in New York City.
- August 20 – The London Symphony Orchestra becomes the first British orchestra to take part in the Salzburg Festival.
- August 25 – The Allman Brothers nearly suffer another tragedy when Butch Trucks crashes his car near Macon, Georgia, not far from where Duane Allman was killed two years earlier. Trucks survives with only a broken leg.

=== September–December ===
- September 1 – The Rolling Stones open their European tour in Vienna, Austria.
- September 6 - "Here he is, the biggest, largest, most gigantic and fantastic man, the co-star of my next movie - Elton John!" That's how John is introduced at the Hollywood Bowl. The concert's emcee is none other than pornographic film star Linda Lovelace.
- September 20 – Jim Croce, Maury Muehleisen and four others die in a plane crash in Louisiana.
- September 22 – Benita Valente makes her debut with the Metropolitan Opera, singing Pamina in The Magic Flute.
- September 23 – The Roxy Theatre opens in West Hollywood, California.
- September 27 – Don Kirshner's Rock Concert is premièred on syndicated television in the United States, including a performance by The Rolling Stones.
- September 29 – Jan Akkerman from the Netherlands was chosen 'Best Guitarist in The World' by the readers of the UK magazine, Melody Maker.
- October 5 – Genesis releases their 5th studio album Selling England by the Pound, one of their most commercially successful albums.
- October 6 – Brighouse and Rastrick Brass Band become the national brass-band champions of Great Britain by defeating 18 other bands at the Albert Hall in London.
- October 13 – Family play their last concert at De Montfort Hall at Leicester Polytechnic (now De Montfort University) before splitting up for good. A farewell party at a local Holiday Inn after the show ends in a good-natured melée, with people jumping in or pushed into the motel pool.
- October 17 – The 1973 oil crisis begins, causing shortages of the vinyl needed to manufacture records. A number of new albums are either delayed or only available in limited quantities until after the holiday season.
- October 20 – Queen Elizabeth II of the United Kingdom opens Sydney Opera House.
- November 1 – Kiss becomes the first act signed to Neil Bogart's new label, Casablanca Records.
- November 5
  - Cellist Jacqueline du Pré is forced to retire because she has been diagnosed with multiple sclerosis.
  - Two friends of the recently deceased Gram Parsons hand themselves in to police and confess to having carried out an impromptu cremation of the singer's body at the Joshua Tree National Monument.
- November 7 – Harold Holt Ltd., agent for Jacqueline du Pré, deny newspaper reports that she will never perform again, while at the same time confirming she has been diagnosed with "a mild case of multiple sclerosis" and has no definite plans for future performances.
- November 10 – The 2nd OTI Festival, held at the Palácio das Artes in Belo Horizonte, Brazil, is won by the song "Qué alegre va María", written by Celia Bonfil, and performed by Imelda Miller representing Mexico.
- November 20 – The Who open their Quadrophenia US tour with a concert at San Francisco's Cow Palace, but drummer Keith Moon passes out and has to be carried off the stage. 19-year old fan Scot Halpin is selected from the audience to finish the show.
- November 24 – Première of Górecki's Three Dances, Op. 34, in Rybnik. Performed by the Rybnik Philharmonic Orchestra conducted by Antoni Szafranek.
- December – Paul Pena produces his second album, New Train, but due to a dispute with Albert Grossman of Bearsville Records the release was canceled. The album would later be released on Hybrid Recordings in 2000.
- December 10 – CBGB music club opens in Manhattan.
- December 15 – Jermaine Jackson marries Hazel Gordy, daughter of Motown Records executive Berry Gordy.
- December 25 – Universal Pictures releases The Sting, reviving interest in the ragtime music of Scott Joplin.
- December 31
  - Brothers Malcolm and Angus Young perform under the name AC/DC at the former Sydney nightclub 'Chequers' for their New Year's Eve party.
  - The second annual New Year's Rockin' Eve airs on NBC, with performances by Tower of Power, Billy Preston and The Pointer Sisters.

=== Unknown dates ===
- Musica Antiqua Köln formed.
- Royal Manchester College of Music and the Northern School of Music merge to create the Royal Northern College of Music.
- Seiji Ozawa is appointed musical director of the Boston Symphony Orchestra.
- The Santa Fe Chamber Music Festival is launched, with Pablo Casals as its president.
- U.F.O. signs a contract with Chrysalis Records.
- Approximate date – Salsa music originates in New York City.
- The pioneer disco gay nightclub the Tenth Floor closes in Manhattan.

== Bands formed ==
- See Musical groups established in 1973

== Bands disbanded ==
- See Musical groups disestablished in 1973

== Albums released ==
=== January ===
Day	Album	Artist	Notes
1	Precious Lord: New Recordings of the Great Songs of Thomas A. Dorsey	Various Artists	-
5	Aerosmith	Aerosmith	Debut
5	Greetings from Asbury Park, N.J.	Bruce Springsteen & the E-Street Band	Debut
8	Approximately Infinite Universe	Yoko Ono	-
8	Holland	The Beach Boys	-
12	Who Do We Think We Are	Deep Purple	US
12	Palepoli	Osanna	-
15	Any Old Wind That Blows	Johnny Cash	-
19	Life in a Tin Can	Bee Gees	-
19	Birds of Fire	Mahavishnu Orchestra	-
23	The Six Wives of Henry VIII	Rick Wakeman	-
25	Dixie Chicken	Little Feat	-
25	The Great Lost Kinks Album	The Kinks	Compilation of unreleased material
26	Don't Shoot Me I'm Only the Piano Player	Elton John	-
30	Funky Serenity	Ramsey Lewis	-
-	Life and Times	Jim Croce	-
-	Artificial Paradise	The Guess Who	-
-	Back in '72	Bob Seger	-
-	Doug Sahm and Band	Doug Sahm	-
-	GP	Gram Parsons	-
-	Heartbreaker	Free	-
-	In Concert	Derek and the Dominos	Live 1970
-	Let Me Touch Your Mind	Ike & Tina Turner	-
-	Naked Songs	Al Kooper	-
-	Prelude	Eumir Deodato	-
-	True Stories and Other Dreams	Judy Collins	-
-	We the People	Ellen McIlwaine	-

=== February ===
Day	Album	Artist	Notes
1	Aloha from Hawaii Via Satellite	Elvis Presley	Live
7	Raw Power	The Stooges	-
10	Cameo	Dusty Springfield	-
12	We Found It	Porter Wagoner and Dolly Parton	-
18	Blueprint	Rory Gallagher	-
21	Masterpiece	The Temptations	-
22	Amabutho	Ladysmith Black Mambazo	-
27	Billion Dollar Babies	Alice Cooper	-
28	Camel	Camel	Debut
-	Tyranny and Mutation	Blue Öyster Cult	-
-	Greenslade	Greenslade	Debut
-	All Out	Grin	-
-	In the Right Place	Dr. John	-
-	Back Up Against the Wall	Atlanta Rhythm Section	-
-	The Best of Mountain	Mountain	Compilation
-	Black Caesar	James Brown	Soundtrack
-	David Ruffin	David Ruffin	-
-	Heaven Help the Child	Mickey Newbury	-
-	Rosie	Fairport Convention	-
-	Shoot Out at the Fantasy Factory	Traffic	-
-	Solid Air	John Martyn	-
-	A Woofer in Tweeter's Clothing	Sparks	UK release (released in 1972 in US)

=== March ===
Day	Album	Artist	Notes
1	The Dark Side of the Moon	Pink Floyd	US; released in UK on 16 March
1	Paris 1919	John Cale	-
1	The Singer	Liza Minnelli	-
1	A Wizard, a True Star	Todd Rundgren	-
2	ELO 2/Electric Light Orchestra II	Electric Light Orchestra	-
2	The Captain and Me	The Doobie Brothers	-
5	In Deep	Argent	-
6	Closing Time	Tom Waits	-
7	Byrds	The Byrds	-
9	The New Age	Canned Heat	-
16	Tanx	T. Rex	-
23	For Your Pleasure	Roxy Music	-
23	Larks' Tongues in Aspic	King Crimson	-
26	Beck, Bogert & Appice	Beck, Bogert & Appice	-
26	Ring Ring	ABBA	-
27	I've Got So Much to Give	Barry White	-
28	Houses of the Holy	Led Zeppelin	-
28	My Tennessee Mountain Home	Dolly Parton	-
29	Skywriter	The Jackson 5	-
30	Sextant	Herbie Hancock	-
-	Penguin	Fleetwood Mac	-
-	Ooh La La	Faces	-
-	Rock and Roll	Foghat	aka Rock and Roll
-	After You, Pride's Not Hard to Swallow	Hank Williams, Jr.	-
-	Atem	Tangerine Dream	-
-	Cosmic Wheels	Donovan	-
-	Grand Hotel	Procol Harum	-
-	Heart Food	Judee Sill	-
-	A Letter to Myself	The Chi-Lites	-
-	Lonesome, On'ry and Mean	Waylon Jennings	-
-	Losin' Streak	Ray Stevens	-
-	My Feet Are Smiling	Leo Kottke	Live
-	Neither One of Us	Gladys Knight & the Pips	-
-	No Ruinous Feud	Incredible String Band	-
-	Raunch 'N' Roll Live	Black Oak Arkansas	Live
-	Spinners	The Spinners	-
-	Still Alive and Well	Johnny Winter	-
-	Sylvester and the Hot Band	Sylvester	-
-	Twice Removed from Yesterday	Robin Trower	-
-	Where Are You Now, My Son?	Joan Baez	-

=== April ===
Day	Album	Artist	Notes
2	1962-1966	The Beatles	Compilation
2	1967-1970	The Beatles	Compilation
2	The Gospel Road	Johnny Cash	Soundtrack
12	Bloodshot	The J. Geils Band	-
13	Catch a Fire	Bob Marley & The Wailers	-
13	Music & Me	Michael Jackson	-
17	Desperado	Eagles	-
18	Renaissance	The Miracles	-
19	Aladdin Sane	David Bowie	-
23	Down the Road	Manassas	-
30	Red Rose Speedway	Paul McCartney and Wings	-
-	Air Cut	Curved Air	-
-	Bittersweet White Light	Cher	-
-	The Blue Ridge Rangers	John Fogerty	-
-	Call Me	Al Green	-
-	Danny's Song	Anne Murray	Studio and live
-	Diamond Girl	Seals and Crofts	-
-	Eat It	Humble Pie	Double LP; three sides studio, one side live
-	Home Thoughts	Clifford T. Ward	-
-	Last of the Brooklyn Cowboys	Arlo Guthrie	-
-	Live Songs	Leonard Cohen	Live
-	The Marshall Tucker Band	The Marshall Tucker Band	-
-	Ma	Rare Earth	-
-	Melanie at Carnegie Hall	Melanie	Live
-	Parcel of Rogues	Steeleye Span	-
-	Thirty Seconds Over Winterland	Jefferson Airplane	Live
-	Uriah Heep Live	Uriah Heep	Live
-	Zarathustra	Museo Rosenbach	-

=== May ===
Day	Album	Artist	Notes
5	There Goes Rhymin' Simon	Paul Simon	-
7	Daltrey	Roger Daltrey	
11	Space Ritual	Hawkwind	Live
11	Wishbone Four	Wishbone Ash	-
16	Now & Then	Carpenters	-
17	Bachman–Turner Overdrive	Bachman–Turner Overdrive	Debut
18	History of The Byrds	The Byrds	Compilation
18	Yessongs	Yes	Live
21	What's Your Mama's Name	Tanya Tucker	-
25	Flying Teapot	Gong	-
25	Tubular Bells	Mike Oldfield	-
30	Les Granges Brûlées	Jean Michel Jarre	-
30	Living in the Material World	George Harrison	US
-	Any Day Now	Scott Walker	-
-	Bananamour	Kevin Ayers	-
-	Country Casanova	Commander Cody	-
-	Eddie Kendricks	Eddie Kendricks	-
-	Head to the Sky	Earth, Wind & Fire	-
-	Honey in the Rock	Charlie Daniels	-
-	I Knew Jesus (Before He Was a Star)	Glen Campbell	-
-	Oora	Edgar Broughton Band	-
-	The Pointer Sisters	Pointer Sisters	-
-	Razamanaz	Nazareth	-
-	Rigor Mortis Sets In	John Entwistle	-
-	Tower of Power	Tower of Power	-
-	You Broke My Heart So I Busted Your Jaw	Spooky Tooth	-

=== June ===
Day	Album	Artist	Notes
1	Touch Me	Gary Glitter	-
4	A White Sport Coat and a Pink Crustacean	Jimmy Buffett	-
8	Facts of Life	Bobby Womack	-
11	Shotgun Willie	Willie Nelson	-
15	Messin'	Manfred Mann's Earth Band	-
18	Extension of a Man	Donny Hathaway	-
18	The Smoker You Drink, the Player You Get	Joe Walsh	-
19	Smokey	Smokey Robinson	-
22	Touch Me in the Morning	Diana Ross	-
25	Chicago VI	Chicago	-
25	Hey Now Hey (The Other Side of the Sky)	Aretha Franklin	-
25	Honky Tonk Heroes	Waylon Jennings	-
30	Never Turn Your Back on a Friend	Budgie	-
-	All I Need Is Time	Gladys Knight & the Pips	-
-	Fresh	Sly & the Family Stone	-
-	The Plan	The Osmonds	-
-	10	The Guess Who	-
-	Crossword Puzzle	The Partridge Family	-
-	Fantasy	Carole King	-
-	Farewell Andromeda	John Denver	-
-	Jesus Christ Superstar	Various Artists	Soundtrack
-	A Little Touch of Schmilsson in the Night	Harry Nilsson and Gordon Jenkins	-
-	Roger McGuinn	Roger McGuinn	-

=== July ===
Day	Album	Artist	Notes
2	Love and Music	Porter Wagoner and Dolly Parton	-
9	Cosmic Slop	Funkadelic	-
13	A Passion Play	Jethro Tull	-
13	History of the Grateful Dead, Volume One (Bear's Choice)	Grateful Dead	Live 1970
13	Pat Garrett & Billy the Kid	Bob Dylan	Soundtrack
13	Queen	Queen	Debut
16	Elvis	Elvis Presley	-
16	We're an American Band	Grand Funk Railroad	-
18	Rufus	Rufus	-
20	Genesis Live	Genesis	Live
20	Love Devotion Surrender	Carlos Santana and John McLaughlin	-
20	Mott	Mott the Hoople	-
23	Long Hard Climb	Helen Reddy	-
26	Tres Hombres	ZZ Top	-
27	New York Dolls	New York Dolls	-
-	Foreigner	Cat Stevens	-
-	10cc	10cc	-
-	African Herbsman	The Wailers	Compilation
-	Barry Manilow	Barry Manilow	-
-	Boulders	Roy Wood	-
-	Countdown to Ecstasy	Steely Dan	-
-	Janis Joplin's Greatest Hits	Janis Joplin	Compilation
-	Styx II	Styx	-
-	The Morning After	Maureen McGovern	-
-	The Sweet	Sweet	US-only compilation and debut
-	Unlucky Boy	Chicken Shack	-
-	Whatever Turns You On	West, Bruce and Laing	-

=== August ===
Day	Album	Artist	Notes
1	Killing Me Softly	Roberta Flack	-
3	Innervisions	Stevie Wonder	-
7	3 + 3	The Isley Brothers	-
7	Pressure Cookin'	Labelle	-
10	Sing It Again Rod	Rod Stewart	Compilation
13	(Pronounced 'Lĕh-'nérd 'Skin-'nérd)	Lynyrd Skynyrd	-
17	And I Love You So	Perry Como	-
23	Body Talk	George Benson	-
28	Let's Get It On	Marvin Gaye	-
31	Goats Head Soup	The Rolling Stones	-
31	Legend	Henry Cow	Debut
-	Moontan	Golden Earring	-
-	41 Original Hits from the Soundtrack of American Graffiti	Various Artists	Soundtrack
-	Bio	Chuck Berry	-
-	Brothers and Sisters	The Allman Brothers Band	-
-	Chi-Lites	The Chi-Lites	-
-	Deliver the Word	War	-
-	Future Days	Can	-
-	Hard Nose the Highway	Van Morrison	-
-	Kindling	Gene Parsons	-
-	Live at Montezuma Hall	Mickey Newbury	Live
-	Maria Muldaur	Maria Muldaur	-
-	No Sweat	Blood, Sweat & Tears	-
-	Valley Hi	Ian Matthews	-
-	Volcanic Rock	Buffalo	-
-	Yeah!	Brownsville Station	-

=== September ===
Day	Album	Artist	Notes
3	Sweet Freedom	Uriah Heep	-
3	Johnny Cash and His Woman	Johnny Cash and June Carter Cash	-
5	Buckingham Nicks	Buckingham Nicks	-
7	Over-Nite Sensation	Frank Zappa	-
10	Eric Clapton's Rainbow Concert	Eric Clapton	Live
10	Side 3	Raspberries	-
11	Angel Clare	Art Garfunkel	-
14	Bubbling Over	Dolly Parton	-
21	In a Glass House	Gentle Giant	-
21	Vagabonds of the Western World	Thin Lizzy	-
21	Faust IV	Faust	-
21	G.I.T.: Get It Together	The Jackson 5	-
21	Everybody Likes Some Kind of Music	Billy Preston	-
24	Milestones	Roy Orbison	-
24	Super Fly T.N.T.	Osibisa	Soundtrack
28	Hello!	Status Quo	-
28	Sladest	Slade	Compilation
-	Back into the Future	Man	Live
-	Communication	Junipher Greene	
-	Bang	James Gang	-
-	Call of the Wild	Ted Nugent and The Amboy Dukes	-
-	Crazy Eyes	Poco	-
-	Don't Call Me Mama Anymore	Cass Elliot	Live
-	Hank Wilson's Back Vol. I	Leon Russell	-
-	Ecstasy	Ohio Players	
-	From the Depths of My Soul	Marlena Shaw	-
-	Full Moon	Kris Kristofferson and Rita Coolidge	-
-	Half-Breed	Cher	-
-	I'm a Writer, Not a Fighter	Gilbert O'Sullivan	-
-	It's Only a Movie	Family	-
-	Live! The World of Ike & Tina	Ike & Tina Turner	Live
-	Mine	Dolly Parton	Compilation
-	Nice 'n' Greasy	Atomic Rooster	-
-	Paper Roses	Marie Osmond	-
-	Pretty Much Your Standard Ranch Stash	Michael Nesmith	-
-	Song for Juli	Jesse Colin Young	-
-	Show Your Hand	Average White Band	Debut
-	Ten Years Are Gone	John Mayall	-
-	Where My Heart Is	Ronnie Milsap	-
-	Wild and Peaceful	Kool & the Gang	-

=== October ===
Day	Album	Artist	Notes
1	Raised on Rock	Elvis Presley	-
1	Spectrum	Billy Cobham	-
1	Don't Cry Now	Linda Ronstadt	-
2	Stone Gon'	Barry White	-
5	Berlin	Lou Reed	-
5	For Girls Who Grow Plump in the Night	Caravan	-
5	Goodbye Yellow Brick Road	Elton John	-
5	Selling England by the Pound	Genesis	
5	These Foolish Things	Bryan Ferry	Solo Debut
9	Cyan	Three Dog Night	-
9	Imagination	Gladys Knight & the Pips	-
10	Inside	Eloy	-
13	Ol' Blue Eyes Is Back	Frank Sinatra	-
14	Jackie Jackson	Jackie Jackson	-
15	For Everyman	Jackson Browne	-
15	Moondog Matinee	The Band	-
15	Mystery to Me	Fleetwood Mac	-
15	Time Fades Away	Neil Young	Live
15	Wake of the Flood	Grateful Dead	-
16	Live in Europe	Creedence Clearwater Revival	Live
17	Montrose	Montrose	-
19	Burnin'	Bob Marley & The Wailers	-
19	The Joker	Steve Miller Band	-
19	Jonathan Livingston Seagull	Neil Diamond	-
19	Pin Ups	David Bowie	Covers album
23	High on the Hog	Black Oak Arkansas	-
25	Honky Tonk Heroes	Waylon Jennings	-
26	Quadrophenia	The Who	
26	Diana & Marvin	Diana Ross and Marvin Gaye	-
26	Hat Trick	America	-
26	Head Hunters	Herbie Hancock	-
29	It's Like You Never Left	Dave Mason	-
-	Ashes Are Burning	Renaissance	-
-	At the Rainbow	Focus	Live
-	The Adventures of Panama Red	New Riders of the Purple Sage	-
-	All American Boy	Rick Derringer	-
-	Bodacious DF	Bodacious DF	-
-	Bulletin Board	The Partridge Family	-
-	Cyborg	Klaus Schulze	-
-	Dreams Are Nuthin' More Than Wishes	David Cassidy	-
-	Earth	Vangelis	-
-	Five & Dime	David Ackles	-
-	Full Sail	Loggins and Messina	-
-	Gone Crazy	Grin	-
-	Hymn of the Seventh Galaxy	Return to Forever	-
-	Inside Out	John Martyn	-
-	It's Been a Long Time	The New Birth	-
-	I Remember Hank Williams	Glen Campbell	-
-	Laid Back	Gregg Allman	-
-	Marjory Razorblade	Kevin Coyne	-
-	Nine	Fairport Convention	-
-	On the Road	Traffic	Live
-	Playin' Favorites	Don McLean	-
-	Please Don't Ever Change	Brinsley Schwarz	-
-	Ralf und Florian	Kraftwerk	-
-	Suzi Quatro	Suzi Quatro	-
-	Sweet Revenge	John Prine	-
-	Takin' My Time	Bonnie Raitt	-
-	You've Got It Bad Girl	Quincy Jones	-

=== November ===
Day	Album	Artist	Notes
1	Stranded	Roxy Music	-
2	Barbra Streisand...And Other Musical Instruments	Barbra Streisand	-
2	On the Road to Freedom	Alvin Lee	-
2	Ringo	Ringo Starr	-
5	The Wild, the Innocent & the E Street Shuffle	Bruce Springsteen	-
9	Ladies Invited	The J. Geils Band	-
9	Loud 'n' Proud	Nazareth	UK
9	(No Pussyfooting)	Robert Fripp and Brian Eno	Debut
9	Welcome	Santana	-
14	Piano Man	Billy Joel	-
16	Back Street Crawler	Paul Kossoff	-
16	Bette Midler	Bette Midler	-
16	Between Nothingness and Eternity	Mahavishnu Orchestra	Live
16	Mind Games	John Lennon	-
16	Next	The Sensational Alex Harvey Band	-
16	Preservation Act 1	The Kinks	-
19	The Beach Boys in Concert	The Beach Boys	Live
19	Dylan	Bob Dylan	Outtakes recorded 1969–'70
20	Muscle of Love	Alice Cooper	-
23	Feeling the Space	Yoko Ono	-
26	Ass	Badfinger	-
30	Sabbath Bloody Sabbath	Black Sabbath	
30	Solar Fire	Manfred Mann's Earth Band	-
-	Tattoo	Rory Gallagher	-
-	Abandoned Luncheonette	Hall & Oates	-
-	Bedside Manners Are Extra	Greenslade	-
-	Rockin' with Curly Leads	The Shadows	-
-	Electric Jewels	April Wine	-
-	Friends and Legends	Michael Stanley	-
-	The Human Menagerie	Cockney Rebel	-
-	John Denver's Greatest Hits	John Denver	Compilation
-	Live Dates	Wishbone Ash	Live
-	Nutbush City Limits (album)	Ike & Tina Turner	-
-	On the Third Day	Electric Light Orchestra	US
-	Ship Ahoy	The O'Jays	-
-	Quiet Places	Buffy Sainte-Marie	-
-	Stretch	Scott Walker	-
-	Viva Terlingua	Jerry Jeff Walker	Live
-	Witness	Spooky Tooth	-
-	Wovoka	Redbone	-

=== December ===
Day	Album	Artist	Notes
	I Got a Name	Jim Croce	Posthumous
6	Last Time I Saw Him	Diana Ross	-
6	Livin' for You	Al Green	-
7	1990	The Temptations	-
7	Angel's Egg	Gong	-
7	Band on the Run	Paul McCartney & Wings	
7	Brain Salad Surgery	Emerson, Lake & Palmer	
7	Freedom for the Stallion	The Hues Corporation	Debut
7	Tales from Topographic Oceans	Yes	Double album
21	Ridin' the Storm Out	REO Speedwagon	-
-	Short Stories	Harry Chapin	-
-	Comin' Atcha	Madeline Bell	-
-	Bachman–Turner Overdrive II	Bachman–Turner Overdrive	-
-	Essence to Essence	Donovan	-
-	The Ozark Mountain Daredevils	Ozark Mountain Daredevils	-
-	Virtuoso	Joe Pass	-

=== Release date unknown ===
- 8th Street Nites - Back Door
- 953 West - Siegel-Schwall Band
- Abbiamo tutti un blues da piangere – Perigeo
- Afrodisiac – Fela Kuti
- Afrodisiac - The Main Ingredient
- After the Ball - John Fahey
- The Alchemist - Home
- Andy Pratt - Andy Pratt
- Anthenagin - Art Blakey
- Aquashow – Elliott Murphy
- Arbeit macht frei – Area
- Astral Traveling - Lonnie Liston Smith
- Attempted Mustache – Loudon Wainwright III
- Back to the World – Curtis Mayfield
- Bad Dreams - Ike Turner
- Baron von Tollbooth & the Chrome Nun - Paul Kantner, Grace Slick, and David Freiberg
- Basic Miles: The Classic Performances of Miles Davis – Miles Davis
- Be What You Are - The Staple Singers
- Beans and Fatback - Link Wray
- Behind Closed Doors – Charlie Rich
- Betty Davis – Betty Davis
- Black & Blue - Harold Melvin & the Blue Notes
- Black Byrd - Donald Byrd
- Bongo Rock - Incredible Bongo Band
- Both Feet on the Ground - Kenny Burrell
- Brenda - Brenda Lee
- Bummm! – Locomotiv GT
- Bursting at the Seams - Strawbs
- Butterfly Dreams - Flora Purim
- Call of the Wild - The Amboy Dukes
- Can't Get No Grindin' - Muddy Waters
- Canto por travesura – Víctor Jara
- Cannons in the Rain - John Stewart
- Carnegie Hall - Hubert Laws
- Chameleon in the Shadow of the Night - Peter Hammill
- The Chieftains 4 – The Chieftains
- Chemins de Terre – Alan Stivell
- Le Cimetière des arlequins – Ange
- Come into My Life - Jermaine Jackson
- Composite Truth - Mandrill
- Concerto delle menti – Pholas Dactylus
- Conference of the Birds – Dave Holland
- Cosmic Cowboy Souvenir - Michael Martin Murphey
- Crystal Silence - Chick Corea and Gary Burton
- Dave Mason Is Alive - Dave Mason
- Dear Folks, Sorry I Haven't Written Lately - Roger Miller
- Doing It to Death - The J.B.'s
- Don't Mess with Mister T. - Stanley Turrentine
- Double Diamond – If
- Dublin Street Songs / Through Dublin City – Frank Harte
- Duncan Browne - Duncan Browne
- Etta James - Etta James
- Evolution - Malo
- Extensions - McCoy Tyner
- Farewell to Paradise – Emitt Rhodes
- The Faust Tapes – Faust
- Felona e Sorona – Le Orme
- For Real! – Ruben and the Jets
- Forever and Ever – Demis Roussos
- Funky Kingston - Toots and the Maytals
- Gentleman - Fela Kuti
- Ghetto: Misfortune's Wealth - 24-Carat Black
- Giant Box - Don Sebesky
- Gluggo - The Spencer Davis Group
- Grimms – Grimms
- How Sweet to Be an Idiot – Neil Innes
- Have a Good Time for Me – Jonathan Edwards
- I'm in Love with You – The Detroit Emeralds
- Join Inn – Ash Ra Tempel
- Journey - Kingdom Come
- Joy - Isaac Hayes
- Julien – Dalida
- Just Outside of Town - Mandrill
- Kings of Oblivion - Pink Fairies
- Layers - Les McCann
- Lifemask – Roy Harper
- Light as a Feather – Return to Forever
- Live at the Lighthouse – Elvin Jones – Live
- Live in Japan: Spring Tour 1973 – Donovan
- The London Bo Diddley Sessions - Bo Diddley
- Looking Back – Leon Russell
- Louisiana Rock & Roll - Potliquor
- Louisiana Woman, Mississippi Man - Conway Twitty and Loretta Lynn
- Love Is the Message – MFSB
- Lucy & Carly – The Simon Sisters Sing for Children – The Simon Sisters
- Main Street People - Four Tops
- Marlena Shaw Live at Montreux - Marlena Shaw (Live Album)
- Mëkanïk Dëstruktïẁ Kömmandöh – Magma
- MFSB – MFSB
- The MG's - The MG's
- Mr. Jones – Elvin Jones
- Monk in Tokyo – Thelonious Monk
- Moon Germs - Joe Farrell
- Moonshine - Bert Jansch
- Multiple - Joe Henderson
- Natural High - Bloodstone
- Neu! 2 – Neu!
- The New Quartet - Gary Burton
- Newport Jazz Festival: Live at Carnegie Hall – Ella Fitzgerald
- Nothing Ever Hurt Me (Half as Bad as Losing You) - George Jones
- October - Claire Hamill
- One Man Band - Ronnie Dyson
- Oooh So Good 'n Blues – Taj Mahal
- Our Lady of Late – Meredith Monk
- Outside the Dream Syndicate - Tony Conrad and Faust
- Over the Rainbow - Livingston Taylor
- Penny Arcade - Joe Farrell
- Pipedream – Alan Hull (solo début)
- Plain and Simple – The Dubliners
- Planxty – Planxty (début)
- The Power of Joe Simon - Joe Simon
- Really – J.J. Cale
- Right Now! – Little Richard
- Rock On – David Essex
- Rockin' Duck – Grimms
- Sings in Italian for You – Dalida
- Solitaire – Andy Williams
- Solo Concerts: Bremen/Lausanne – Keith Jarrett
- Songs That Made America Famous – Patrick Sky
- Southern Roots: Back Home to Memphis – Jerry Lee Lewis
- Starring Rosi – Ash Ra Tempel
- Studio One Presents Burning Spear - Burning Spear
- Super Natural – Edwin Birdsong
- The Supremes Live! In Japan – Supremes – Live
- The Táin – Horslips
- Tango – Tanguito
- There's No Me Without You – The Manhattans
- The Three Degrees – The Three Degrees
- Take Love Easy – Ella Fitzgerald and Joe Pass
- Upsetters 14 Dub Blackboard Jungle – Lee Perry
- Viva Chile! – Inti-Illimani
- The Way – The Way
- The Well Below the Valley – Planxty
- Wizzard Brew – Wizzard (début)

== Biggest hit singles ==
The following songs achieved the highest chart positions in the charts of 1973.

#	Artist	Title	Year	Country	Chart entries
1	The Rolling Stones	Angie	1973	(United Kingdom)	US BB 1 – Sep 1973, Canada 1 – Sep 1973, Netherlands 1 – Sep 1973, France 1 – Sep 1973, Switzerland 1 – Sep 1973, Norway 1 – Oct 1973, Australia 1 for 5 weeks Jun 1974, Australia Goset 1 – Oct 1973, Europe 3 of the 1970s, Germany 4 – Jan 1974, Belgium 4 of all time, UK 5 – Sep 1973, Italy 6 of 1974, Austria 8 – Oct 1973, DDD 11 of 1973, Australia 19 of 1973, RYM 27 of 1973, Poland 43 of all time, Scrobulate 51 of ballad, US CashBox 69 of 1973, OzNet 71, Germany 190 of the 1970s, WXPN 571, Acclaimed 1093
2	Tony Orlando & Dawn	Tie a Yellow Ribbon Round the Ole Oak Tree	1973	(United States)	UK 1 – Mar 1973, US BB 1 – Mar 1973, US CashBox 1 of 1973, Canada 1 – Mar 1973, Netherlands 1 – Apr 1973, Norway 1 – May 1973, Australia 1 of 1973, Éire 1 – Apr 1973, Australia 1 for 7 weeks Dec 1973, Australia Goset 1 – May 1973, Austria 2 – Jun 1973, France 3 – Apr 1973, Germany 10 – Jun 1973, South Africa 10 of 1973, US BB 11 of 1973, TOTP 14, Global 33 (5 M sold) – 1973, POP 36 of 1973, DDD 88 of 1973
3	Sweet	The Ballroom Blitz	1973 1975 (us)	(United Kingdom)	Canada 1 – Aug 1975, France 1 – Oct 1973, Éire 1 – Sep 1973, Australia Goset 1 – Nov 1973, UK 2 – Sep 1973, Norway 2 – Oct 1973, Switzerland 3 – Sep 1973, Germany 3 – Jan 1974, Netherlands 4 – Sep 1973, US BB 5 – Aug 1975, Austria 5 – Nov 1973, Australia 9 of 1974, Scrobulate 9 of glam rock, US BB 11 of 1975, RYM 15 of 1973, POP 30 of 1975, US CashBox 46 of 1975, DDD 51 of 1973, Germany 137 of the 1970s, TheQ 188, OzNet 217, Acclaimed 2373
4	Elton John	Crocodile Rock	1972	(United Kingdom)	US BB 1 – Dec 1972, Canada 1 – Dec 1972, Switzerland 1 – Jan 1973, Italy 1 of 1973, Australia Goset 2 – Jan 1973, Norway 3 – Feb 1973, US CashBox 4 of 1973, Germany 4 – Jan 1973, UK 5 – Nov 1972, Australia 5 of 1973, Austria 6 – Feb 1973, France 9 – Dec 1972, POP 9 of 1973, Netherlands 12 – Dec 1972, OzNet 12, US BB 16 of 1973, RYM 26 of 1972, DDD 27 of 1972, Germany 223 of the 1970s, Acclaimed 2325
5	Roberta Flack	Killing Me Softly With His Song	1973	(United States)	US BB 1 – Feb 1973, Canada 1 – Feb 1973, Australia 1 for 2 weeks Nov 1973, Australia Goset 1 – Mar 1973, Grammy in 1973, Netherlands 3 – Feb 1973, Norway 4 – Aug 1973, France 5 – Apr 1973, UK 6 – Feb 1973, DDD 8 of 1973, Australia 17 of 1973, Austria 19 – Dec 1973, US CashBox 21 of 1973, RYM 25 of 1973, Switzerland 32 – Oct 1996, RIAA 101, Rolling Stone 360, Acclaimed 631, OzNet 863

== Top 40 Chart hit singles ==
Song title	Artist(s)	Release date(s)	US	UK	Highest chart position	Other Chart Performance(s)
"5:15"	The Who	September 1973	45	20	20 (United Kingdom)	n/a
"48 Crash"	Suzi Quatro	July 1973	n/a	3	1 (Australia)	See chart performance entry
"20th Century Boy"	T. Rex	March 1973	n/a	3	1 (Ireland)	8 (West Germany) - 9 (Norway) - 28 (Spain) - 57 (Australia)
"A Hard Rain's a-Gonna Fall"	Bryan Ferry	September 1973	n/a	10	10 (United Kingdom)	13 (Ireland) - 34 (Australia)
"A Love Song"	Anne Murray	December 1973	12	n/a	1 (Canada)	1 (U.S. Billboard Adult Contemporary) - 5 (U.S. Billboard Hot Country Songs) - 88 (Australia)
"After the Goldrush"	Prelude	November 1973	22	21	21 (United Kingdom)	51 (Australia)
Ain't No Woman (Like the One I've Got)	Four Tops	January 1973	4	n/a	4 (United States)	1 (U.S. Cash Box Top 100) - 2 (U.S Billboard Best Selling Soul Singles) - 11 (Canada) - 14 (U.S. Billboard Adult Contemporary)
"All I Know"	Art Garfunkel	August 1973	9	n/a	1 (Canada)	1 (U.S. Billboard Adult Contemporary) - 6 (U.S. Cash Box Top 100) - 7 (Canada) - 17 (New Zealand) - 36 (Australia)
"All the Way from Memphis"	Mott the Hoople	July 1973	n/a	10	10 (United Kingdom)	n/a
"Alright Alright Alright"	Mungo Jerry	June 1973	n/a	3	2 (Netherlands [Dutch Single Top 100])	4 (Ireland) - 12 (Belgium [Flanders], Germany) - 16 (Belgium [Wallonia]) - 26 (Australia)
"Also Sprach Zarathustra (2001)"	Deodato	January 1973	2	7	2 (United States)	3 (Canada) - 5 (U.S. Billboard Easy Listening) - 22 (Canadian RPM AC Chart)
"Angel Fingers (A Teen Ballad)"	Wizzard	September 1979	n/a	1	1 (United Kingdom)	7 (Ireland) - 42 (Australia)
"Angie"	The Rolling Stones	August 1973	1	5	1 (9 countries)	See chart performance entry
"Are You Man Enough"	The Four Tops	June 1973	15	55	15 (U.S. Billboard Hot 100)	2 (U.S Billboard Best Selling Soul Singles) - 35 (Canada)
"Armed and Extremely Dangerous"	First Choice	March 1973	28	16	16 (United Kingdom)	1 (UK Blues & Soul magazine chart) - 11 (U.S. Billboard Best Selling Soul Singles) - 19 (U.S. Cash Box Top 100) - 55 (Canada)
"Baby, I Love You"	Dave Edmunds	January 1973	n/a	8	8 (United Kingdom)	n/a
"Bad, Bad Leroy Brown"	Jim Croce	March 1973	1	n/a	1 (United States)	2 (Canada) - 7 (New Zealand) - 34 (Australia)
"Basketball Jones"	Cheech & Chong	August 1973	15	n/a	15 (United States)	n/a
"Be"	Neil Diamond	October 1973	34	n/a	34 (United States)	2 (U.S. Billboard Adult Contemporary)
"Behind Closed Doors"	Charlie Rich	January 1973	15	n/a	1 (U.S. Billboard Hot Country Singles)	15 (United States) - 8 (U.S. Billboard Adult Contemporary)
"Blinded by the Light"	Bruce Springsteen	February 1973	n/a	n/a	n/a	n/a
"Block Buster!"	Sweet	January 1973	73	1	1 (5 countries)	See chart performance entry
"Boogie Woogie Bugle Boy"	Bette Midler	May 1973	8	n/a	1 (U.S. Billboard Adult Contemporary)	8 (United States)
"Born to Be with You"	Dave Edmunds	June 1973	96	5	2 (Netherlands)	5 (United Kingdom) - 12 (Ireland) - 59 (Australia)
"Brother Louie"	Hot Chocolate	March 1973	n/a	7	7 (United Kingdom)	n/a
"Brother Louie"	Stories	June 1973	1	n/a	1 (United States)	1 (Canada) - 1 (U.S. Cash Box Top 100) - 22 (U.S. Billboard Hot Soul Singles)
"Call Me (Come Back Home)"	Al Green	February 1973	10	n/a	2 (U.S. Billboard Hot Soul Singles)	10 (United States) - 60 (Canada)
"Can the Can"	Suzi Quatro	May 1973	56	1	1 (5 countries)	See chart performance entry
"Candle in the Wind"	Elton John	October 1973	n/a	11	11 (United Kingdom)	5 (Ireland) - 34 (Australia)
"Caroline"	Status Quo	August 1973	n/a	5	5 (United Kingdom)	7 (Ireland) - 36 (Germany)
"C'est pour toi"	Mocedades	March 1973	n/a	n/a	n/a	French language release of "Eres tú"
"China Grove"	The Doobie Brothers	July 1973	15	n/a	15 (United States)	7 (Canada) - 61 (Australia)
"Cindy Incidentally"	Faces	February 1973	58	2	2 (United Kingdom)	4 (Ireland)
"Close Your Eyes"	Edward Bear	February 1973	37	n/a	3 (Canada)	37 (United States) - 11 (U.S. Billboard Adult Contemporary)
"Could It Be I'm Falling in Love"	The Spinners	December 1972	4	12	1 (U.S. Billboard Hot Soul Singles)	4 (United States) - 12 (United Kingdom) - 12 (Canada)
"Cum on Feel the Noize"	Slade	February 1973	98	1	1 (United Kingdom)	1 (Ireland) - 8 (GSA) - 18 (Australia)
"Daddy's Home"	Jermaine Jackson	November 1972	9	n/a	3 (U.S. Billboard Hot Soul Singles)	9 (United States)
"Daisy a Day"	Jud Strunk	February 1973	14	n/a	1 (Australia)	14 (United States) - 4 (U.S. Billboard Adult Contemporary)
"Dancin' (on a Saturday Night)"	Barry Blue	April 1973	93	2	2 (United Kingdom)	2 (Australia) - 3 (Ireland) - 14 (Germany)
"Dancing in the Moonlight"	King Harvest	July 1972	13	n/a	5 (Canada)	13 (United States) - 22 (U.S. Cash Box Top 100)
"Daniel"	Elton John	March 1973	2	4	1 (Canada)	1 (U.S. Billboard Adult Contemporary) - 2 (United States) - 4 (United Kingdom) - 7 (Australia)
"Daydreamer" / "The Puppy Song"	David Cassidy	October 1973	n/a	1	1 (United Kingdom)	1 (Ireland) - 3 (South Africa) - 10 (Australia)
"Delta Dawn"	Helen Reddy	June 1973	1	n/a	1 (United States)	1 (Canada) - 1 (U.S. Billboard Adult Contemporary) - 34 (Australia)
"Diamond Girl"	Seals and Crofts	April 1973	6	n/a	4 (U.S. Billboard Adult Contemporary)	6 (United States) - 5 (Canada)
"Do It Again"	Steely Dan	November 1972	6	39	6 (United States)	6 (Canada) - 60 (Australia)
"Do You Wanna Dance"	Barry Blue	October 1973	n/a	7	7 (United Kingdom)	14 (Australia)
"Do You Wanna Dance?"	Bette Midler	November 1972	17	n/a	17 (United States)	6 (U.S. Billboard Adult Contemporary)
"Do You Wanna Touch Me (Oh Yeah)"	Gary Glitter	January 1973	n/a	2	2 (United Kingdom)	9 (Australia) - 11 (Ireland)
"Don't Expect Me to Be Your Friend"	Lobo	November 1972	8	n/a	1 (U.S. Billboard Adult Contemporary)	8 (United States) - 3 (Canada)
"Don't Let Me Be Lonely Tonight"	James Taylor	November 1972	14	n/a	3 (U.S. Billboard Adult Contemporary)	14 (United States) - 18 (Canada)
"Doo Doo Doo Doo Doo (Heartbreaker)"	The Rolling Stones	December 1973	15	n/a	15 (United States)	5 (Canada)
"Dream On"	Aerosmith	June 1973	59	n/a	59 (United States)	n/a
"Drive-In Saturday"	David Bowie	April 1973	n/a	3	3 (United Kingdom)	4 (Ireland) - 16 (Finland)
"D'yer Mak'er"	Led Zeppelin	September 1973	20	n/a	20 (United States)	7 (Canada)
"Everything's Been Changed"	The 5th Dimension	April 1973	70	n/a	18 (U.S. Billboard Adult Contemporary)	70 (United States)
"Eye Level"	Simon Park Orchestra	August 1973	n/a	1	1 (United Kingdom)	3 (South Africa) - 6 (Australia) - 23 (Germany)
"Feelin' Stronger Every Day"	Chicago	June 1973	10	n/a	10 (United States)	4 (Canada)
"For Your Love"	Gwen McCrae	April 1973	n/a	n/a	n/a	n/a
"Frankenstein"	The Edgar Winter Group	February 1973	1	18	1 (United States)	See chart performance entry
"Get Down"	Gilbert O'Sullivan	March 1973	7	1	1 (United Kingdom)	See chart performance entry
"Give Me Love (Give Me Peace on Earth)"	George Harrison	May 1973	1	8	1 (United States)	See chart performance entry
"Goin' Home"	The Osmonds	June 1973	36	4	4 (United Kingdom)	36 (United States)
"Goodbye Yellow Brick Road"	Elton John	October 1973	2	6	1 (Canada)	See chart performance entry
"Gypsy Man"	War	June 1973	8	n/a	6 (U.S. Cash Box Top 100)	8 (United States) - 6 (Canada)
"Half-Breed"	Cher	July 1973	1	n/a	1 (United States)	1 (Canada) - 3 (U.S. Billboard Adult Contemporary) - 4 (Australia)
"Heartbeat - It's a Lovebeat"	DeFranco Family	August 1973	3	n/a	1 (Canada)	3 (United States) - 58 (Australia)
"Helen Wheels"	Paul McCartney & Wings	October 1973	10	12	7 (Australia)	10 (United States) - 12 (United Kingdom)
"Hell Raiser"	Sweet	April 1973	n/a	2	1 (Germany)	2 (United Kingdom) - 2 (Ireland) - 4 (Switzerland) - 11 (Australia)
"Hello Hooray"	Alice Cooper	January 1973	35	6	6 (United Kingdom)	6 (Ireland) - 13 (Germany) - 14 (Canada) - 95 (Australia)
"Hello It's Me"	Todd Rundgren	September 1973	5	n/a	5 (United States)	17 (Canada)
"Hello, Hello, I'm Back Again"	Gary Glitter	March 1973	n/a	2	2 (United Kingdom)	2 (Ireland) - 10 (Australia) - 12 (Germany)
"Here I Am (Come and Take Me)"	Al Green	June 1973	10	n/a	2 (U.S. Billboard Hot Soul Singles)	10 (United States) - 19 (Canada)
"Hi, Hi, Hi" / "C Moon"	Wings	December 1972	10	5	1 (Canada)	5 (United Kingdom) - 7 (Australia) - 16 (Germany)
"Higher Ground"	Stevie Wonder	July 1973	4	29	1 (U.S. Billboard Hot Soul Singles)	4 (United States) - 9 (Canada) - 62 (Australia)
"Hocus Pocus"	Focus	February 1973	9	20	9 (United States)	15 (Australia) - 18 (Canada)
"Hummingbird"	Seals and Crofts	October 1972	20	n/a	12 (U.S. Billboard Adult Contemporary)	20 (United States) - 46 (Canada)
"Hurting Each Other"	The Carpenters	December 1971	2	n/a	1 (U.S. Billboard Adult Contemporary)	2 (United States) - 2 (Canada) - 4 (Australia)
"I Believe in You (You Believe in Me)"	Johnnie Taylor	June 1973	11	n/a	1 (U.S. Billboard Hot Soul Singles)	11 (United States) - 36 (Canada)
"I Got a Name"	Jim Croce	September 1973	10	n/a	4 (U.S. Billboard Adult Contemporary)	10 (United States) - 6 (Canada)
"I Love You Love Me Love"	Gary Glitter	November 1973	n/a	1	1 (United Kingdom)	1 (Ireland) - 2 (Australia) - 11 (Germany)
"I Wanna Be with You"	Raspberries	November 1972	16	n/a	16 (United States)	15 (Canada)
"I Wish It Could Be Christmas Everyday"	Wizzard	November 1973	n/a	4	4 (United Kingdom)	6 (Ireland)
"If You Don't Know Me by Now"	Harold Melvin & the Blue Notes	September 1972	3	9	1 (U.S. Billboard Hot Soul Singles)	3 (United States) - 9 (United Kingdom)
"I'm Doin' Fine Now"	New York City	February 1973	17	20	14 (U.S. Billboard Hot Soul Singles)	17 (United States) - 20 (United Kingdom) - 11 (Canada)
"I'm Gonna Love You Just a Little More Baby"	Barry White	April 1973	3	23	1 (U.S. Billboard Hot Soul Singles)	3 (United States) - 23 (United Kingdom) - 14 (Canada)
"I'm Just a Singer (In a Rock and Roll Band)"	The Moody Blues	January 1973	12	36	8 (Canada)	12 (United States) - 36 (United Kingdom) - 39 (Australia)
"I'm the Leader of the Gang (I Am)"	Gary Glitter	July 1973	n/a	1	1 (United Kingdom)	1 (Ireland) - 9 (Germany) - 11 (Australia)
"I've Got to Use My Imagination"	Gladys Knight & the Pips	November 1973	4	n/a	1 (U.S. Billboard Hot Soul Singles)	4 (United States) - 11 (Canada)
"Jambalaya (On the Bayou)"	John Fogerty	January 1973	16	n/a	5 (Canada)	16 (United States)
"Jimmy Loves Mary-Anne"	Looking Glass	July 1973	33	n/a	33 (United States)	19 (Canada)
"Just You 'n' Me"	Chicago	September 1973	4	n/a	1 (Canada)	4 (United States) - 7 (U.S. Billboard Adult Contemporary) - 67 (Australia)
"Keep On Truckin'"	Eddie Kendricks	August 1973	1	18	1 (United States)	1 (U.S. Billboard Hot Soul Singles) - 18 (United Kingdom) - 6 (Canada)
"Keeper of the Castle"	Four Tops	October 1972	10	n/a	7 (U.S. Billboard Hot Soul Singles)	10 (United States) - 35 (Canada)
"Killing Me Softly with His Song"	Roberta Flack	January 1973	1	6	1 (4 countries)	See chart performance entry
"Kodachrome"	Paul Simon	May 1973	2	n/a	1 (Canada)	2 (United States) - 2 (U.S. Billboard Adult Contemporary) - 12 (Australia)
"Lamplight"	David Essex	November 1973	n/a	7	7 (United Kingdom)	n/a
"Last Song"	Edward Bear	September 1972	3	n/a	1 (Canada)	3 (United States) - 2 (U.S. Billboard Adult Contemporary) - 4 (Australia)
"Leave Me Alone (Ruby Red Dress)"	Helen Reddy	October 1973	3	n/a	1 (U.S. Billboard Adult Contemporary)	3 (United States) - 2 (Australia) - 1 (Canada)
"Let It Ride"	Bachman–Turner Overdrive	November 1973	23	n/a	3 (Canada)	23 (United States)
"Let Me Be There"	Olivia Newton-John	September 1973	6	n/a	2 (Canada)	6 (United States) - 3 (U.S. Billboard Adult Contemporary) - 7 (U.S. Billboard Hot Country Singles) - 11 (Australia)
"Let Me In"	The Osmonds	August 1973	36	2	2 (United Kingdom)	5 (Ireland) - 36 (United States)
"Let Me Serenade You"	Three Dog Night	October 1973	17	n/a	17 (United States)	12 (Canada)
"Let's Get It On"	Marvin Gaye	June 1973	1	31	1 (United States)	1 (U.S. Billboard Hot Soul Singles) - 31 (United Kingdom) - 11 (Canada)
"Life on Mars?"	David Bowie	June 1973	n/a	3	3 (United Kingdom)	4 (Ireland) - 39 (Germany)
"Live and Let Die"	Wings	June 1973	2	9	2 (United States)	2 (Canada) - 5 (Australia) - 9 (United Kingdom)
"Living for the City"	Stevie Wonder	November 1973	8	15	1 (U.S. Billboard Hot Soul Singles)	8 (United States) - 15 (United Kingdom) - 17 (Canada)
"Living Together, Growing Together"	The 5th Dimension	January 1973	32	n/a	5 (U.S. Billboard Adult Contemporary)	32 (United States)
"Long Train Runnin'"	The Doobie Brothers	March 1973	8	n/a	8 (United States)	8 (Canada) - 58 (Australia)
"Love Isn't Easy (But It Sure Is Hard Enough)"	ABBA	June 1973	n/a	n/a	n/a	n/a
"Love Train"	The O'Jays	December 1972	1	9	1 (United States)	1 (U.S. Billboard Hot Soul Singles) - 9 (United Kingdom) - 15 (Canada) - 91 (Australia)
"Loves Me Like a Rock"	Paul Simon	July 1973	2	39	1 (U.S. Billboard Adult Contemporary)	2 (United States) - 1 (Canada) - 39 (United Kingdom)
"Mama Loo"	Les Humphries Singers	February 1973	n/a	n/a	1 (Germany)	1 (Austria) - 1 (Switzerland)
"Masterpiece"	The Temptations	February 1973	7	n/a	1 (U.S. Billboard Hot Soul Singles)	7 (United States) - 15 (Canada)
"Me and Mrs. Jones"	Billy Paul	September 1972	1	12	1 (United States)	1 (U.S. Billboard Hot Soul Singles) - 12 (United Kingdom) - 14 (Canada)
"Merry Xmas Everybody"	Slade	December 1973	n/a	1	1 (United Kingdom)	1 (Ireland) - 4 (Germany) - 55 (Australia)
"Midnight Rider"	Gregg Allman	November 1973	19	n/a	19 (United States)	17 (Canada)
"Midnight Train to Georgia"	Gladys Knight & the Pips	August 1973	1	10	1 (United States)	1 (U.S. Billboard Hot Soul Singles) - 10 (United Kingdom) - 19 (Canada)
"Mind Games"	John Lennon	October 1973	18	26	11 (Canada)	18 (United States) - 26 (United Kingdom) - 16 (Australia)
"Money"	Pink Floyd	May 1973	13	n/a	6 (Canada)	13 (United States) - 10 (Austria)
"Muskrat Love"	America	June 1973	67	n/a	11 (U.S. Billboard Adult Contemporary)	67 (United States)
"My Coo Ca Choo"	Alvin Stardust	November 1973	n/a	2	1 (Australia)	2 (United Kingdom) - 1 (Ireland) - 3 (Germany)
"My Friend Stan"	Slade	September 1973	n/a	2	1 (Ireland)	2 (United Kingdom) - 5 (Germany) - 44 (Australia)
"My Love"	Paul McCartney & Wings	March 1973	1	9	1 (United States)	See chart performance entry
"My Maria"	B. W. Stevenson	August 1973	9	n/a	1 (U.S. Billboard Adult Contemporary)	9 (United States) - 7 (Canada)
"Natural High"	Bloodstone	April 1973	10	40	4 (U.S. Billboard Hot Soul Singles)	10 (United States) - 40 (United Kingdom)
"Neither One of Us (Wants to Be the First to Say Goodbye)"	Gladys Knight & the Pips	December 1972	2	n/a	1 (U.S. Billboard Hot Soul Singles)	2 (United States) - 15 (Canada)
"Nina, Pretty Ballerina"	ABBA	October 1973	n/a	n/a	8 (Austria)	n/a
"No More Mr. Nice Guy"	Alice Cooper	March 1973	25	10	10 (United Kingdom)	25 (United States) - 38 (Canada) - 50 (Australia)
"Nutbush City Limits"	Ike & Tina Turner	August 1973	22	4	1 (Austria)	4 (United Kingdom) - 2 (Germany) - 14 (Australia) - 22 (United States)
"Oh, Babe, What Would You Say?"	Hurricane Smith	May 1972	3	4	1 (Canada)	3 (United States) - 4 (United Kingdom) - 3 (U.S. Billboard Adult Contemporary)
"One and One Is One"	Medicine Head	April 1973	n/a	3	3 (United Kingdom)	14 (Germany)
"One of a Kind (Love Affair)"	The Spinners	April 1973	11	n/a	1 (U.S. Billboard Hot Soul Singles)	11 (United States) - 19 (Canada)
"Painted Ladies"	Ian Thomas	August 1973	34	n/a	4 (Canada)	34 (United States)
"Paper Plane"	Status Quo	November 1972	n/a	8	8 (United Kingdom)	11 (Ireland)
"Paper Roses"	Marie Osmond	August 1973	5	2	1 (U.S. Billboard Hot Country Singles)	5 (United States) - 2 (United Kingdom) - 1 (Canada)
"Photograph"	Ringo Starr	September 1973	1	8	1 (United States)	1 (Canada) - 1 (Australia) - 8 (United Kingdom)
"Pick Up the Pieces"	Hudson Ford	July 1973	n/a	8	8 (United Kingdom)	n/a
"Pillow Talk"	Sylvia	March 1973	3	14	1 (U.S. Billboard Hot Soul Singles)	3 (United States) - 14 (United Kingdom)
"Playground in My Mind"	Clint Holmes	June 1972	2	n/a	1 (Canada)	2 (United States) - 7 (Australia)
"Power to All Our Friends"	Cliff Richard	March 1973	109	4	1 (Malaysia)	4 (United Kingdom) - 2 (Ireland) - 4 (Germany)
"Pretty Lady"	Lighthouse	September 1973	53	n/a	9 (Canada)	53 (United States)
"Radar Love"	Golden Earring	August 1973	13	7	1 (Netherlands)	7 (United Kingdom) - 13 (United States) - 10 (Australia)
"Ramblin' Man"	The Allman Brothers Band	August 1973	2	n/a	2 (United States)	7 (Canada) - 41 (Australia)
"Randy"	Blue Mink	June 1973	n/a	9	9 (United Kingdom)	n/a
"Reelin' in the Years"	Steely Dan	March 1973	11	n/a	11 (United States)	15 (Canada) - 62 (Australia)
"Right Place, Wrong Time"	Dr. John	April 1973	9	n/a	9 (United States)	6 (Canada)
"Ring Ring"	ABBA	February 1973	n/a	32	1 (Sweden)	32 (United Kingdom) - 92 (Australia)
"Rock On"	David Essex	August 1973	5	3	1 (Canada)	3 (United Kingdom) - 5 (United States)
"Rocky Mountain High"	John Denver	October 1972	9	n/a	3 (U.S. Billboard Adult Contemporary)	9 (United States) - 8 (Canada)
"Rocky Mountain Way"	Joe Walsh	June 1973	23	n/a	23 (United States)	n/a
"Roll Away the Stone"	Mott the Hoople	November 1973	n/a	8	4 (Ireland)	8 (United Kingdom) - 68 (Australia)
"Roll Over Beethoven"	Electric Light Orchestra	January 1973	42	6	6 (United Kingdom)	42 (United States) - 19 (Canada) - 53 (Australia)
"Rubber Bullets"	10cc	May 1973	73	1	1 (United Kingdom)	1 (Ireland) - 3 (Australia)
"Sail On, Sailor"	The Beach Boys	February 1973	79	n/a	79 (United States)	n/a
"Saturday Night's Alright for Fighting"	Elton John	June 1973	12	7	7 (United Kingdom)	12 (United States) - 13 (Ireland) - 31 (Australia)
"See My Baby Jive"	Wizzard	April 1973	n/a	1	1 (United Kingdom)	1 (Ireland) - 5 (Germany) - 12 (Australia)
"Send a Little Love My Way"	Anne Murray	July 1973	72	n/a	10 (U.S. Billboard Adult Contemporary)	72 (United States) - 25 (Canadian RPM AC)
"Shambala"	Three Dog Night	May 1973	3	n/a	1 (Canada)	3 (United States) - 3 (U.S. Cash Box Top 100)
"Show and Tell"	Al Wilson	October 1973	1	n/a	1 (United States)	10 (U.S. Billboard Hot Soul Singles) - 2 (Canada)
"Sing"	The Carpenters	February 1973	3	n/a	1 (U.S. Billboard Adult Contemporary)	3 (United States) - 4 (Canada) - 24 (Australia)
"Skweeze Me, Pleeze Me"	Slade	June 1973	n/a	1	1 (United Kingdom)	1 (Ireland) - 3 (Germany) - 25 (Australia)
"Smarty Pants"	First Choice	June 1973	56	9	9 (United Kingdom)	25 (U.S. Billboard Hot Soul Singles) - 56 (United States)
"Smoke on the Water"	Deep Purple	May 1973	4	21	2 (Canada)	4 (United States) - 21 (United Kingdom) - 54 (Australia)
"Solitaire"	Andy Williams	September 1973	n/a	4	4 (United Kingdom)	23 (U.S. Billboard Adult Contemporary)
"Sorrow"	David Bowie	October 1973	n/a	3	1 (Australia)	3 (United Kingdom) - 2 (Ireland) - 1 (New Zealand)
"Soul Makossa"	Manu Dibango	June 1973	35	n/a	21 (U.S. Cash Box Top 100)	35 (United States) - 14 (U.S. Billboard Hot Soul Singles)
"Space Race"	Billy Preston	September 1973	4	n/a	1 (U.S. Billboard Hot Soul Singles)	4 (United States) - 3 (U.S. Cash Box Top 100)
"Stir It Up"	Johnny Nash	November 1972	12	13	11 (U.S. Cash Box Top 100)	12 (United States) - 13 (United Kingdom) - 26 (Australia)
"Stuck in the Middle with You"	Stealers Wheel	January 1973	6	8	2 (Canada)	6 (United States) - 8 (United Kingdom) - 28 (Australia)
"Sunday Sunrise"	Brenda Lee	July 1973	n/a	n/a	6 (U.S. Billboard Hot Country Singles)	8 (Canada Country Tracks)
"Superstition"	Stevie Wonder	October 1972	1	11	1 (United States)	1 (U.S. Billboard Hot Soul Singles) - 11 (United Kingdom) - 6 (Canada)
"Sweet Understanding Love"	Four Tops	August 1973	33	29	10 (U.S. Billboard Hot Soul Singles)	33 (United States) - 29 (United Kingdom)
"Sylvia"	Focus	January 1973	89	4	4 (United Kingdom)	89 (United States)
"Take Me to the Mardi Gras"	Paul Simon	June 1973	n/a	7	7 (United Kingdom)	n/a
"Teenage Lament '74"	Alice Cooper	November 1973	48	12	12 (United Kingdom)	48 (United States) - 16 (Ireland)
"That Lady, Pt. 1 & 2"	The Isley Brothers	July 1973	6	14	2 (U.S. Billboard Hot Soul Singles)	6 (United States) - 14 (United Kingdom) - 15 (Canada)
"The Ballroom Blitz"	Sweet	September 1973	5	2	1 (6 countries)	See chart performance entry
"The Cisco Kid"	War	February 1973	2	n/a	2 (United States)	5 (U.S. Billboard Hot Soul Singles) - 20 (Canada)
"The Cover of "Rolling Stone""	Dr. Hook & the Medicine Show	November 1972	6	n/a	2 (Canada)	6 (United States) - 11 (Australia)
"The Dean and I"	10cc	August 1973	n/a	10	10 (United Kingdom)	1 (Ireland)
"The Free Electric Band"	Albert Hammond	April 1973	48	19	19 (United Kingdom)	48 (United States) - 32 (Canada) - 9 (Australia)
"The Groover"	T. Rex	June 1973	n/a	4	4 (United Kingdom)	11 (Ireland) - 50 (Australia)
"The Jean Genie"	David Bowie	November 1972	71	2	2 (United Kingdom)	71 (United States) - 22 (Canada) - 42 (Australia)
"The Joker"	Steve Miller Band	October 1973	1	1	1 (United States)	See chart performance entry
"The Morning After"	Maureen McGovern	May 1973	1	n/a	1 (United States)	6 (U.S. Billboard Adult Contemporary) - 2 (Canada) - 34 (Australia)
"The Most Beautiful Girl"	Charlie Rich	September 1973	1	2	1 (3 countries)	See chart performance entry
"The Night the Lights Went Out in Georgia"	Vicki Lawrence	January 1973	1	n/a	1 (United States)	1 (Canada) - 6 (Australia)
"The Old Fashioned Way"	Charles Aznavour	July 1973	n/a	38	38 (United Kingdom)	n/a
"The Right Thing to Do"	Carly Simon	March 1973	17	17	4 (U.S. Billboard Adult Contemporary)	17 (United States) - 17 (United Kingdom) - 20 (Canada)
"The World Is a Ghetto"	War	November 1972	7	n/a	3 (U.S. Billboard Hot Soul Singles)	7 (United States) - 23 (Canada)
"Tie a Yellow Ribbon Round the Ole Oak Tree"	Dawn featuring Tony Orlando	February 1973	1	1	1 (8 countries)	See chart performance entry
"Time in a Bottle"	Jim Croce	November 1973	1	n/a	1 (United States)	1 (U.S. Billboard Adult Contemporary) - 1 (Canada) - 60 (Australia)
"Top of the World"	The Carpenters	September 1973	1	5	1 (United States)	See chart performance entry
"Touch Me in the Morning"	Diana Ross	May 1973	1	9	1 (United States)	1 (U.S. Billboard Adult Contemporary) - 9 (United Kingdom) - 5 (Canada)
"Trouble Man"	Marvin Gaye	November 1972	7	n/a	4 (U.S. Billboard Hot Soul Singles)	7 (United States) - 21 (Canada)
"Welcome Home"	Peters and Lee	May 1973	n/a	1	1 (United Kingdom)	1 (Ireland) - 12 (Australia)
"We're an American Band"	Grand Funk Railroad	July 1973	1	n/a	1 (United States)	4 (Canada) - 87 (Australia)
"What About Me"	Anne Murray	March 1973	64	n/a	2 (U.S. Billboard Adult Contemporary)	64 (United States) - 22 (Canada)
"Whisky in the Jar"	Thin Lizzy	November 1972	n/a	6	1 (Ireland)	6 (United Kingdom) - 7 (Germany)
"Why Me"	Kris Kristofferson	February 1973	16	n/a	1 (U.S. Billboard Hot Country Singles)	16 (United States) - 9 (Australia)
"Wildflower"	Skylark	February 1973	9	n/a	1 (Canada)	9 (United States)
"Will It Go Round in Circles"	Billy Preston	March 1973	1	n/a	1 (United States)	10 (U.S. Billboard Hot Soul Singles) - 2 (Canada)
"Wonderful Dream (Tu Te Reconnaîtras)"	Anne-Marie David	April 1973	n/a	n/a	2 (Belgium)	3 (Netherlands) - 6 (Germany)
"Won't Somebody Dance with Me"	Lynsey de Paul	October 1973	n/a	14	14 (United Kingdom)	3 (Ireland) - 17 (Netherlands)
"Yesterday Once More"	The Carpenters	May 1973	2	2	1 (3 countries)	See chart performance entry
"You Are the Sunshine of My Life"	Stevie Wonder	March 1973	1	7	1 (United States)	See chart performance entry
"Young Love"	Donny Osmond	August 1973	23	1	1 (United Kingdom)	1 (Ireland) - 23 (United States) - 45 (Australia)
"Your Mama Don't Dance"	Loggins and Messina	November 1972	4	n/a	4 (United States)	17 (Canada)
"You're Gettin' a Little Too Smart"	The Detroit Emeralds	June 1973	101	n/a	10 (U.S. Billboard Hot Soul Singles)	101 (United States)
"You're So Vain"	Carly Simon	November 1972	1	3	1 (3 countries)	See chart performance entry

=== Other Chart hit singles ===
- "All the Way from Memphis" – Mott the Hoople (# 10 UK)
- "Baby, I Love You – Dave Edmunds
- "Bad Bad Leroy Brown" – Jim Croce
- "The Ballroom Blitz" – Sweet
- "Basketball Jones" – Cheech and Chong
- "Be" – Neil Diamond
- "Behind Closed Doors" – Charlie Rich (#15 US)
- "Blinded By the Light" – Bruce Springsteen
- "Blockbuster!" – Sweet
- "Boogie Woogie Bugle Boy" – Bette Midler
- "Born To Be With You – Dave Edmunds
- "Brother Louie" – Hot Chocolate
- "Brother Louie" – Stories
- "Call Me (Come Back Home)" – Al Green
- "Candle in the Wind" – Elton John
- "Can the Can" – Suzi Quatro
- "Caroline" – Status Quo
- "C'est pour toi" (French version of "Touch the Wind") – Mocedades
- "China Grove" – The Doobie Brothers
- "Cindy Incidentally" – Faces
- "The Cisco Kid" – War (#2 US)
- "Close Your Eyes" – Edward Bear
- "Could It Be I'm Falling in Love" – The Spinners
- "The Cover Of "Rolling Stone"" – Dr. Hook & The Medicine Show
- "Cum on Feel the Noize" – Slade
- "Daddy's Home" – Jermaine Jackson
- "Daisy a Day" – Jud Strunk (#14 US)
- "Dancin' (on a Saturday Night)" – Barry Blue
- "Dancing in the Moonlight" – King Harvest
- "Daniel" – Elton John
- "Daydreamer"/"The Puppy Song" – David Cassidy
- "The Dean and I" – 10cc
- "Delta Dawn" – Helen Reddy
- "Diamond Girl" – Seals and Crofts (#6 US)
- "Do It Again" – Steely Dan
- "Do You Wanna Dance" – Barry Blue
- "Do You Wanna Dance?" – Bette Midler
- "Do You Wanna Touch Me" – Gary Glitter
- "Don't Expect Me to Be Your Friend" – Lobo
- "Don't Let Me Be Lonely Tonight" – James Taylor
- "Doo Doo Doo Doo Doo (Heartbreaker)" – The Rolling Stones
- "Dream On" – Aerosmith
- "Drive-In Saturday" – David Bowie (#3 UK)
- "D'yer Mak'er" – Led Zeppelin
- "Everything's Been Changed" – The 5th Dimension
- "Eye Level" – Simon Park Orchestra
- "Feelin' Stronger Every Day" – Chicago
- "For Your Love" – Gwen McCrae
- "Frankenstein" – Edgar Winter Group
- "The Free Electric Band" – Albert Hammond
- "Get Down" – Gilbert O'Sullivan
- "Give Me Love (Give Me Peace on Earth)" – George Harrison
- "Goin' Home" – The Osmonds
- "Goodbye Yellow Brick Road" – Elton John
- "The Groover" – T.Rex
- "Gypsy Man" – War
- "Half-Breed" – Cher
- "A Hard Rain's a-Gonna Fall" – Bryan Ferry
- "Heartbeat - It's a Lovebeat" – DeFranco Family
- "Helen Wheels" – Paul McCartney and Wings
- "Hell Raiser" – Sweet
- "Hello, Hello, I'm Back Again" – Gary Glitter
- "Hello Hooray" – Alice Cooper
- "Hello It's Me" – Todd Rundgren (#5 US)
- "Here I Am (Come and Take Me)" – Al Green
- "Hi, Hi, Hi"/"C Moon" – Wings
- "Higher Ground" – Stevie Wonder
- "Hocus Pocus" – Focus
- "Hummingbird" – Seals and Crofts
- "Hurting Each Other" – The Carpenters
- "I Believe in You (You Believe in Me)" – Johnny Taylor
- "I Got a Name" – Jim Croce
- "I Love You Love Me Love" – Gary Glitter
- "I Wanna Be With You" – Raspberries
- "I Wish It Could Be Christmas Everyday" – Wizzard
- "I'm Doin' Fine Now" – New York City
- "I'm Gonna Love You Just a Little More Baby" – Barry White
- "I'm Just a Singer (In a Rock and Roll Band)" – The Moody Blues
- "I'm the Leader of the Gang (I Am)" – Gary Glitter
- "I've Got to Use My Imagination" – Gladys Knight & The Pips
- "If You Don't Know Me By Now" – Harold Melvin and the Blue Notes
- "Jambalaya (On the Bayou)" – John Fogerty
- "The Jean Genie" – David Bowie
- "Jimmy Loves Mary-Anne" – Looking Glass
- "The Joker" – Steve Miller Band
- "Just You 'N' Me" – Chicago
- "Keep On Truckin'" – Eddie Kendricks (#1 US)
- "Keeper of the Castle" – The Four Tops
- "Killing Me Softly with His Song" – Roberta Flack
- "Kodachrome" – Paul Simon
- "Lamplight" – David Essex
- "Last Song" – Edward Bear
- "Leave Me Alone (Ruby Red Dress)" – Helen Reddy
- "Let It Ride" – Bachman–Turner Overdrive
- "Let Me Serenade You" – Three Dog Night
- "Let's Get It On" – Marvin Gaye
- "Let Me Be There" – Olivia Newton-John
- "Let Me In" – The Osmonds
- "Life on Mars?" – David Bowie
- "Live and Let Die" – Wings
- "Living For the City" – Stevie Wonder
- "Living Together, Growing Together" – The 5th Dimension
- "Long Train Runnin'" – The Doobie Brothers
- "Love Isn't Easy (But It Sure Is Hard Enough)" – ABBA
- "Love Train" – The O'Jays
- "Loves Me Like a Rock" – Paul Simon (with The Dixie Hummingbirds)
- "A Love Song" – Anne Murray
- "Mama Loo" – Les Humphries Singers
- "Masterpiece" – The Temptations (#7 US)
- "Me and Mrs. Jones" – Billy Paul
- "Merry Xmas Everybody" – Slade
- "Midnight Train to Georgia" – Gladys Knight and The Pips
- "Midnight Rider" – Gregg Allman
- "Mind Games" – John Lennon
- "Money" – Pink Floyd
- "The Morning After" – Maureen McGovern
- "The Most Beautiful Girl" – Charlie Rich
- "Muskrat Love" – America
- "My Coo-Ca-Choo" – Alvin Stardust
- "My Friend Stan" – Slade
- "My Love" – Paul McCartney & Wings
- "My Maria" – B. W. Stevenson
- "Natural High" – Bloodstone
- "Neither One of Us (Wants to Be the First to Say Goodbye)" – Gladys Knight & the Pips
- "The Night the Lights Went Out in Georgia" – Vicki Lawrence
- "Nina, Pretty Ballerina" – ABBA
- "No More Mr. Nice Guy" – Alice Cooper
- "Nutbush City Limits – Ike & Tina Turner
- "Oh, Babe, What Would You Say?" – Hurricane Smith
- "One and One is One" – Medicine Head
- "One of a Kind (Love Affair)" – The Spinners
- "Painted Ladies" – Ian Thomas
- "Paper Plane" – Status Quo
- "Paper Roses" – Marie Osmond
- "Photograph" – Ringo Starr (#1 US)
- "Pick Up the Pieces" – Hudson Ford
- "Pillow Talk" – Sylvia
- "Playground in My Mind" – Clint Holmes
- "Pretty Lady" – Lighthouse
- "Power to All Our Friends" – Cliff Richard
- "Radar Love" – Golden Earring
- "Ramblin' Man" – Allman Brothers Band
- "Randy" – Blue Mink
- "Reelin' in the Years" – Steely Dan
- "Right Place, Wrong Time" – Dr. John
- "The Right Thing to Do" – Carly Simon
- "Ring Ring" – ABBA
- "Rock On" – David Essex
- "Rocky Mountain High" – John Denver
- "Rocky Mountain Way" – Joe Walsh
- "Roll Away the Stone" – Mott the Hoople
- "Roll Over Beethoven" – Electric Light Orchestra
- "Rubber Bullets" – 10cc
- "Sail On, Sailor" – The Beach Boys
- "Saturday Night's Alright for Fighting" – Elton John
- "See My Baby Jive" – Wizzard
- "Send a Little Love My Way" – Anne Murray
- "Shambala" – Three Dog Night
- "Show and Tell" – Al Wilson
- "Sing" – The Carpenters
- "Skweeze Me, Pleeze Me" – Slade
- "Smarty Pants" – First Choice
- "Smoke on the Water" – Deep Purple
- "Solitaire" – Andy Williams
- "Sorrow" – David Bowie
- "Soul Makossa" – Manu Dibango
- "Space Race" – Billy Preston
- "Stir It Up" – Johnny Nash
- "Stuck in the Middle with You" – Stealers Wheel
- "Sunday Sunrise" – Brenda Lee
- "Superstition" – Stevie Wonder
- "Sweet Understanding Love" – The Four Tops
- "Sylvia" – Focus
- "Take Me to the Mardi Gras" – Paul Simon
- "Teenage Lament '74" – Alice Cooper
- "Tie a Yellow Ribbon Round the Ole Oak Tree" – Dawn featuring Tony Orlando
- "Time in a Bottle" – Jim Croce
- "That Lady, Pt. 1 & 2" – The Isley Brothers
- "The Old Fashioned Way" – Charles Aznavour
- "Top of the World" – The Carpenters
- "Touch Me in the Morning" – Diana Ross
- "Trouble Man" – Marvin Gaye
- "Welcome Home" – Peters and Lee
- "We're an American Band" – Grand Funk Railroad
- "What About Me" – Anne Murray
- "Whisky in the Jar" – Thin Lizzy
- "Why Me" – Kris Kristofferson
- "Wildflower" – Skylark
- "Will It Go Round in Circles" – Billy Preston
- "Wonderful Dream (Tu Te Reconnaîtras)" – Anne-Marie David (Eurovision winner)
- "Won't Somebody Dance With Me" – Lynsey de Paul
- "The World Is a Ghetto" – War
- "Yesterday Once More" – The Carpenters (#2 US)
- "You Are the Sunshine of My Life" – Stevie Wonder
- "You're Gettin' a Little Too Smart" – The Detroit Emeralds
- "You're So Vain" – Carly Simon (#1 US)
- "Young Love" – Donny Osmond
- "Your Mama Don't Dance" – Kenny Loggins & Jim Messina

== Notable singles ==
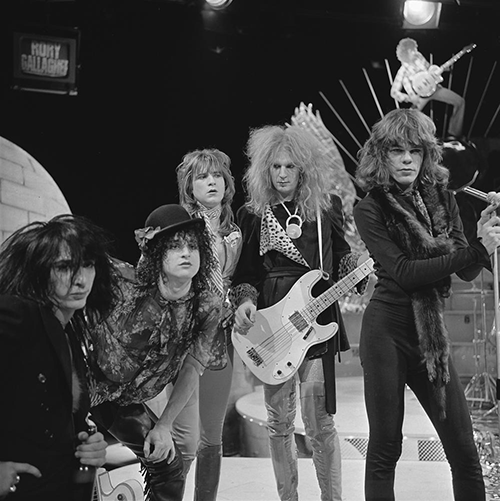
New York Dolls on TopPop in 1973

Song title	Artist(s)	Release date(s)	Other Chart Performance(s)
"Jet Boy" b/w "Vietnamese Baby"	New York Dolls	April 1973	n/a
"Life on Mars" b/w "The Man Who Sold the World"	David Bowie	June 1973	3 (UK Singles Chart) - 39 (West Germany)
"Personality Crisis" b/w "Looking for a Kiss"	New York Dolls	July 1973	n/a
"Search and Destroy"	Iggy and the Stooges	June 1973	n/a
"Shake Appeal" b/w "Search and Destroy"	Iggy and the Stooges	1973	n/a
"Trash" b/w "Personality Crisis"	New York Dolls	July 1973	n/a

=== Other Notable singles ===
- "Ashes to Ashes" - The 5th Dimension
- "Daddy" b/w "It Was Written Down" - Toots and the Maytals

== Published popular music ==
- "And I Love You So" w.m. Don McLean
- "Candle in the Wind" w. Bernie Taupin m. Elton John
- "Empty Tables" w. Johnny Mercer m. Jimmy Van Heusen. Introduced by Frank Sinatra
- "I'll Have to Say I Love You in a Song" w.m. Jim Croce
- "I've Got to Use My Imagination" w.m. Gerry Goffin & Barry Goldberg
- "Last Song" w.m. Lawrence Wayne Evoy
- "Liaisons" w.m. Stephen Sondheim from the musical A Little Night Music
- "Midnight Train to Georgia" w.m. Jim Weatherly
- "Misdemeanor" w.m. Foster Sylvers
- "Nadia's Theme" m. Barry DeVorzon and Perry Botkin, Jr., from the TV soap opera The Young and the Restless
- "(Say Has Anybody Seen) My Sweet Gypsy Rose" w.m. Irwin Levine & L. Russell Brown
- "Piano Man" w.m. Billy Joel
- "Send in the Clowns" w.m. Stephen Sondheim from the musical A Little Night Music
- "Stuck in the Middle with You" w.m. Joe Egan & Gerry Rafferty
- "There Used To Be A Ballpark" w.m. Joe Raposo
- "Top of the World" w.m. John Bettis & Richard Carpenter
- "The Way We Were" w. Alan and Marilyn Bergman m. Marvin Hamlisch from the film The Way We Were
- "WOLD (song)" – Harry Chapin
- "Yesterday Once More" w.m. John Bettis & Richard Carpenter

== Other notable songs (world) ==
- "Desert Of Passion" – The Peanuts (Japan)
- "Fusil Contra Fusil" – Silvio Rodríguez (Cuba)
- "Goodbye, My Love, Goodbye" – Demis Roussos (Europe-wide)
- "I Love You Because" – Michel Polnareff (France)
- "J'ai un probleme" – Sylvie Vartan (France)
- "Mistero" – Gigliola Cinquetti (Italy)

== Classical music ==
- Jean Absil – Concerto for Piano and Orchestra No. 3
- William Alwyn – Fantasy Sonata for flute and harp
- Malcolm Arnold – Symphony No. 7
- Günter Bialas – Trois Moments Musicaux, for piano
- Luciano Berio
  - Concerto for Two Pianos and Orchestra
  - Still, for orchestra
  - Linea for Two Pianos, Marimba and Vibraphone
- John Cage
  - Etcetera, for small orchestra, tape and, optionally, three conductors
  - Exercise, for an orchestra of soloists (based on Etcetera)
- Carlos Chávez
  - Estudio a Rubinstein, for piano
  - Paisajes mexicanos, for orchestra
  - Partita, for timpani
  - Sonante, for orchestra
- Gloria Coates – Music on Open Strings (Symphony No. 1)
- George Crumb – Makrokosmos, Volume II for amplified piano
- Morton Feldman
  - String Quartet and Orchestra
  - For Frank O'Hara, for flute, clarinet, percussion, piano, violin, and cello
  - Voices and Cello, for 2 female voices and cello
- Alberto Ginastera – String Quartet No. 3
- Lou Harrison – Organ Concerto with Percussion
- Anthony Iannaccone – Rituals
- Ben Johnston
  - "I'm Goin' Away", for SATB choir
  - String Quartet No. 3, "Vergings"
  - String Quartet No. 4, "Ascent" ("Amazing Grace")
- Paul Lansky – Mild und leise (computer music)
- Bruno Maderna – Oboe Concerto No. 3
- Frank Martin – Requiem
- Donald Martino – Notturno, for piccolo/flute/alto flute, clarinet/bass clarinet, violin, viola, 'cello, piano, and percussion (awarded the 1974 Pulitzer Prize in Music)
- Akira Miyoshi – Nocturne
- Luigi Nono – Canto per il Vietnam
- Carl Orff – De temporum fine comoedia
- Arvo Pärt – Ukuaru valss
- Walter Piston – Three Counterpoints, for violin, viola, and cello
- Henri Pousseur – Vue sur les Jardins interdits, for saxophone quartet
- Dmitri Shostakovich – Six Poems of Marina Tsvetaeva, Op. 143
- Eduard Tubin – Symphony No. 10
- Henryk Górecki - Three Dances for Orchestra, Op. 34

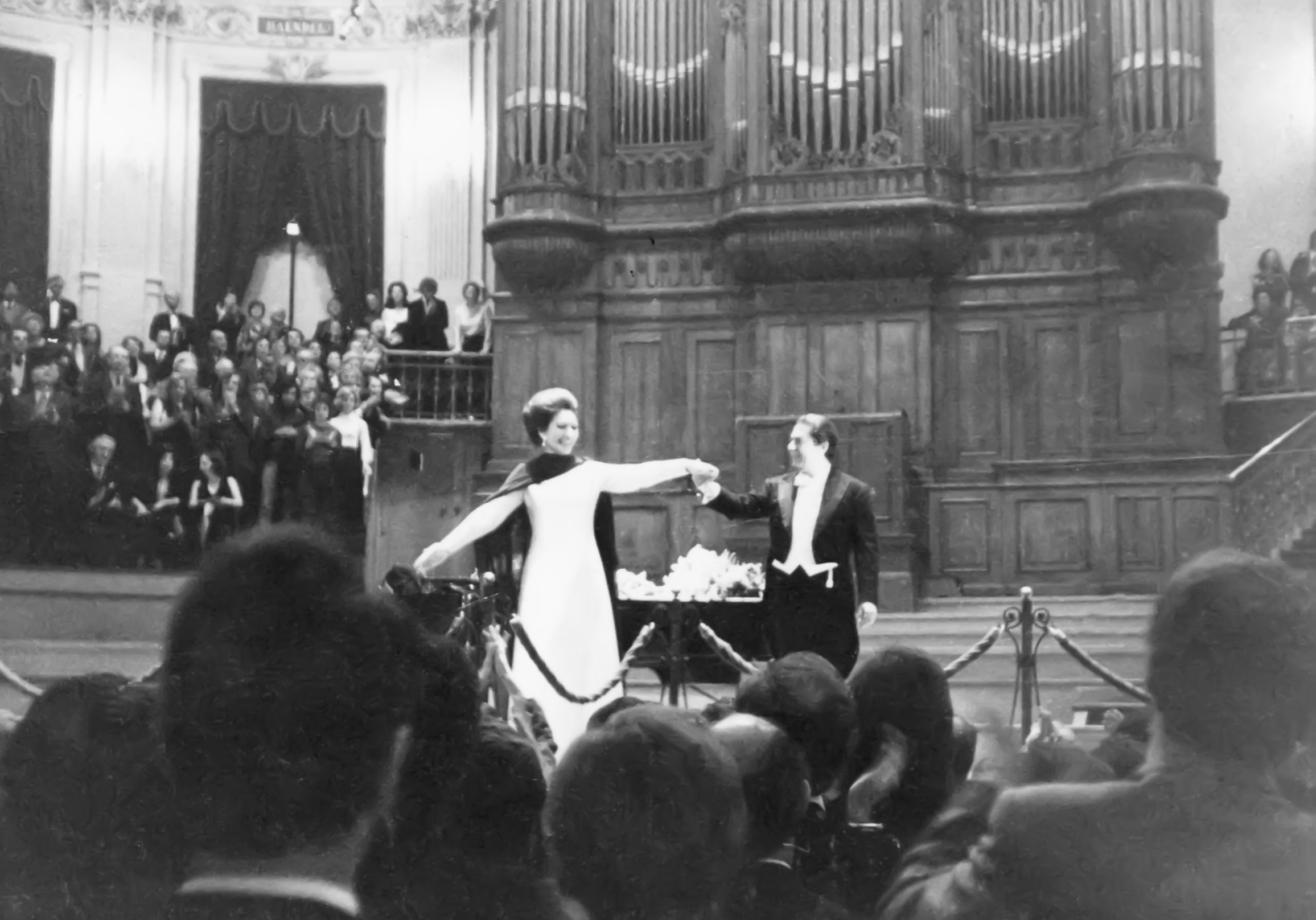
Maria Callas farewell tour, 1973

== Opera ==
- Robert Beadell – Napoleon (2 February, University of Nebraska, Lincoln)
- Nikolai Korndorf – Feast in the Time of Plague

== Musical theater ==
- Gigi (Alan Jay Lerner and Frederick Loewe) – Broadway production (adaptation of the film version)
- Grease – London production
- Gypsy (Jule Styne and Stephen Sondheim) – London production opened at the Piccadilly Theatre on May 29 starring Angela Lansbury, Barrie Ingham and Zan Charisse
- Irene – Broadway revival
- The King and I (Rodgers & Hammerstein) – London revival
- La Révolution Française (Claude-Michel Schönberg, Raymond Jeannot, Alain Boublil and Jean-Max Rivière) – Original production opened at the Palais des Sports de Paris.
- A Little Night Music (Stephen Sondheim) – Broadway production opened at the Shubert Theatre and ran for 601 performances
- No, No, Nanette (Irving Caesar, Otto Harbach, Vincent Youmans) – London revival
- The Pajama Game (Richard Adler and Jerry Ross) – Broadway revival
- Pippin – London production
- Raisin – Broadway production opened at the 46th Street Theatre and ran for 847 performances
- The Rocky Horror Show (Richard O'Brien) – London production
- Seesaw – Broadway production opened at the Uris Theatre on March 18 and ran for 296 performances
- Treasure Island London production opened at the Mermaid Theatre on December 17. Starred Bernard Miles, Jonathan Scott Taylor and Spike Milligan.
- Two Gentleman of Verona – London production

== Musical films ==
- Allá en el Norte
- Andrea
- Charlotte's Web
- Godspell
- Jaal
- Jesus Christ Superstar
- Lost Horizon
- Maria d'Oro und Bello Blue
- Robin Hood
- Tom Sawyer

== Births ==
- January 1 – Magnus Sahlgren, Swedish guitarist and linguist
- January 7 – Jonna Tervomaa, Finnish singer
- January 9 – Sean Paul, reggae and dancehall artist
- January 12
  - Hande Yener, Turkish singer
  - Matt Wong (Reel Big Fish)
- January 13 - Juan Diego Flórez, Peruvian operatic tenor
- January 14 – Katie Griffin, Canadian actress and singer
- January 17 – Ari Lasso, Indonesian singer
- January 19 – Antero Manninen, Finnish cellist
- January 23 – Masha Katz, Russian singer
- February 1 – Joe Wilson, English musician and record producer (Sneaker Pimps)
- February 2 - Latino, Brazilian singer-songwriter
- February 4 – Brett Hestla, American guitarist and lead singer (Dark New Day)
- February 7 – Kate Thornton, English television presenter and journalist
- February 8 – Project Pat, American rapper
- February 11 – Jeon Do-yeon, South Korean actress
- February 21
  - Heri Joensen, Faroese musician (Týr)
  - Justin Sane, singer, guitarist and songwriter
- February 22
  - Gustavo Assis-Brasil, Brazilian guitarist
  - Scott Phillips, drummer
- February 23 – Corey Lowery (Seether)
- February 24 – Chris Fehn, American rock percussionist (Slipknot)
- February 26
  - André Tanneberger, German DJ
  - Anders and Jonas Björler, Swedish rock guitarists
- February 27 – Peter Andre, English-born Australian singer-songwriter, businessman and television personality
- March 1 – Ryan Peake, Canadian rock musician (Nickelback)
- March 6 – Peter Lindgren, Swedish musician
- March 8 – Anneke van Giersbergen, Dutch singer and guitarist
- March 10
  - Dan Swanö, Swedish musician
  - John LeCompt, American guitarist (We Are the Fallen, Evanescence)
- March 13 – David Draiman, American vocalist (Disturbed (band))
- March 17 – Caroline Corr, Irish drummer (The Corrs)
- March 19 – Bun B, American rapper
- March 22 – Beverley Knight, English actress and singer-songwriter
- March 25 – Anders Fridén, Swedish vocalist
- March 28 – Matt Nathanson, American folk/rock singer-songwriter
- March 30 – DJ AM, American DJ (d. 2009)
- April 3
  - Marija Gluvakov, pianist
  - Andreas Carlsson, Swedish music producer, composer and pop songwriter
- April 4 – Kelly Price, soul singer
- April 5 – Pharrell Williams, American rapper, singer-songwriter and record and film producer (The Neptunes, N.E.R.D, Chad Hugo)
- April 16 – Akon, American singer-songwriter, businessman, record producer and actor
- April 20 – Gabry Ponte, Italian musician, DJ, and record producer (Eiffel 65)
- April 22 – Jung Woo-sung, South Korean actor
- April 24 – Brian Marshall, American musician and songwriter (Creed)
- April 25 – Fredrik Larzon, Swedish rock musician (Millencolin)
- April 27 – Sharlee D'Angelo, Swedish guitarist
- April 28
  - Alejandro Ibarra, Mexican actor and singer
  - Big Gipp, American rapper (Ali & Gipp)
- April 29 – Mike Hogan, Irish bassist (The Cranberries)
- April 30 – Jeff Timmons, American singer
- May 2 – Justin Burnett, film score composer
- May 3 – Brad Martin, American country musician (died 2022)
- May 5 – Casino Versus Japan, electronic musician
- May 8 – Kim Ji-hoon, South Korean singer (Two Two) (d. 2013)
- May 13 – Eric Lewis, jazz pianist
- May 14
  - Natalie Appleton, British singer (All Saints)
  - Shanice, American singer
  - Sinéad O'Carroll, Irish singer (B*Witched)
- May 16 – Sonny Sandoval, American musician, rapper, singer and songwriter (P.O.D.)
- May 17
  - Joshua Homme, guitarist and vocalist of Queens of the Stone Age
  - Stefanie Ridel, American R&B singer and actress (Wild Orchid)
- May 20 – Elsa Lunghini, French singer and actress
- May 21 – Noel Fielding, English comedian, writer, actor, artist, musician and television presenter
- May 22 – Donell Jones, American R&B singer, songwriter, and record producer
- May 23
  - Jacopo Gianninoto, Italian musician
  - Emperor Magus Caligula, Swedish musician
  - Maxwell, American singer-songwriter and record producer
- May 24
  - Dermot O'Leary, English-Irish broadcaster
  - Ruslana, Ukrainian singer-songwriter
  - Jill Johnson, Swedish country and pop singer
- May 26 - Magdalena Kožená, Czech mezzo-soprano
- May 31 – Cadaveria, Italian singer (Opera IX)
- June 1 – Jason Truby, American guitarist (Living Sacrifice, P.O.D.)
- June 5 - Michelle Leonard, German / British singer and songwriter
- June 9 – Jana Sýkorová, Czech operatic contralto
- June 10
  - Faith Evans, singer-songwriter, record producer and actress
  - Flesh-n-Bone, American rapper
- June 13
  - Cheryl "Coko" Clemons, American singer (SWV)
  - Kasia Kowalska, Polish singer, songwriter and actress
- June 14 – Ceca, Serbian folk singer
- June 17 – Krayzie Bone, American rapper and producer (Bone Thugs-N-Harmony)
- June 19 – Jörg Widmann, German clarinetist and composer
- June 19 – Yuko Nakazawa, Japanese singer (Morning Musume)
- June 20 – Chino Moreno, American singer-songwriter (Deftones, Team Sleep, and Crosses)
- June 22 – Chris Traynor, American musician, songwriter and producer (Bush)
- June 23 – Marija Naumova, Latvian Eurovision-winning singer
- June 24 – Lee Sang-min, South Korean singer, songwriter, record producer and television personality (Roo'ra)
- June 25 – Nuno Resende, Portuguese singer
- June 26 – Gretchen Wilson, American singer
- June 28
  - DJ Vlad, American hip-hop interviewer
  - Frost, Norwegian drummer
- June 30 – Chan Ho Park, South Korean baseball
- July 1 – Brenton Brown, South African-American Christian musician and worship leader
- July 4 – Gackt, singer-songwriter and musician
- July 5
  - Joe, American R&B singer
  - Bengt Lagerberg, Swedish drummer (The Cardigans)
  - Róisín Murphy, Irish singer-songwriter and record producer
- July 8 – Jack Knight, American songwriter
- July 11 – Andrew Bird, singer-songwriter
- July 15
  - Buju Banton, reggae/dancehall artist
  - John Dolmayan, Lebanese-born rock drummer for the band System of a Down
- July 17 – Tony Dovolani, Albanian-American dancer and actor
- July 22
  - Aleksey Igudesman, Russian violinist, composer, conductor and actor
  - Daniel Jones, English-Australian guitarist, songwriter and producer (Savage Garden)
  - Petey Pablo, American rapper and actor
  - Rufus Wainwright, American-Canadian singer-songwriter and composer
- July 23
  - Fran Healy, British singer (Travis)
  - Monica Lewinsky, American activist
- July 25 – Dani Filth, Israeli-born musician (Cradle of Filth)
- July 29
  - Wanya Morris, American singer (Boyz II Men)
  - Amy S. Foster, Canadian singer-songwriter and author
- July 30 – Sonu Nigam, Indian singer
- August 4 – Taj Jackson, American R&B singer (3T)
- August 6 – Vera Farmiga, American actress
- August 7 – Zane Lowe, New Zealand born radio and TV presenter, DJ and record producer
- August 8 – Scott Stapp, American singer (Creed)
- August 9
  - Meg Okura, American jazz violinist, Erhu player and composer
  - Oleksandr Ponomariov, Ukrainian singer
- August 12 – Grey DeLisle, American voice actress and singer
- August 12 – Amir El-Falaki, Danish group (Toy-Box)
- August 13 - Gregory Vajda, Hungarian clarinetist, conductor and composer
- August 15 – Adnan Sami, British born singer, music composer, pianist
- August 21 – Mickey Joe Harte, Irish singer-songwriter
- August 22
  - Beenie Man, reggae/dancehall artist
  - Howie Dorough, American singer (Backstreet Boys)
- August 30 – Maino, American rapper and radio personality
- September 1 – J.D. Fortune, Canadian rock singer (INXS)
- September 3
  - Jennifer Paige, American singer-songwriter
  - Utt Panichkul, Thai-American actor and TV presenter
- September 5 – Rose McGowan, American actress, model, singer and author
- September 7 – Tara Slone, Canadian singer (Joydrop)
- September 10 – Nancy Coolen, Dutch singer and television presenter (Twenty 4 Seven)
- September 12 - Dorota Miśkiewicz, Polish singer-songwriter, composer and violinist
- September 14 – Nas, American rapper
- September 15 – Indira Levak, Croatian lead vocalist of Colonia
- September 17 – Amy Black, operatic mezzo-soprano (died 2009)
- September 18 – Ami Onuki, Japanese singer
- September 19
  - David Zepeda, Mexican actor, model and singer
  - Amil, American rapper and singer
- September 22
  - Yoo Chae-yeong, South Korean singer and actress
  - Martin Owen (BBC Symphony Orchestra)
- September 26
  - Julienne Davis, American actress/model/singer
  - Ras Kass, American rapper
- September 27 – Lee Brennan, English singer (911)
- September 29
  - Alfie Boe, operatic tenor
  - Rie Eto, Japanese singer
- October 1 – Christian Borle, American actor and singer
- October 2
  - Proof American Rapper and member of D12 (died 2006)
  - Lene Nystrøm, Norwegian musician, singer-songwriter and actress (Aqua)
  - Verka Serduchka, Ukrainian pop star
- October 3 – LaTocha Scott, American R&B singer-songwriter and actress (Xscape)
- October 4 – Craig Robert Young, English actor
- October 9
  - Steve Burns, American actor, musician, voice actor, singer and television host
  - Brad Kane, American actor, singer, producer and screenwriter
  - Jen Cloher, Australian singer/songwriter/musician
  - Fabio Lione, Italian singer
  - Rimi Natsukawa, Japanese singer
  - Charles Burton, American wrestler
- October 10 – Mario Lopez, American actor and television host
- October 11 – Mike Smith, American guitarist (Snot, TheStart, Limp Bizkit)
- October 24
  - Laura Veirs, American singer-songwriter
  - Madlib, American record producer, rapper, songwriter and disc jockey (Lootpack)
- October 25 – Lamont Bentley, American actor and rapper (died 2005)
- October 26 – Seth MacFarlane, American actor, screenwriter, producer, director and singer
- October 27 – Jessica Andersson, Swedish singer and songwriter (Fame)
- October 30 – Maurizio Lobina, Italian musician and singer (Eiffel 65)
- November 2
  - Wildchild, American rapper (Lootpack)
  - Stevie J, American DJ, record producer and television personality
- November 3
  - Sticky Fingaz, American rapper (onyx)
  - Mick Thomson, guitarist of Slipknot
- November 6 – Rumi Shishido, Japanese voice actress and singer
- November 9
  - Nick Lachey, American singer (98 Degrees)
  - Maija Vilkkumaa, Finnish pop rock singer
- November 10
  - Jacqui Abbott, English singer (The Beautiful South)
  - Róbert Gulya, Hungarian composer
- November 11 – Jason White, American rock musician (Green Day)
- November 12 – Mayte Garcia, American actress, singer, author and dancer
- November 17 – Leslie Bibb, American actress and model
- November 19
  - Billy Currington, American country singer
  - Savion Glover, American tap dancer, actor and choreographer
- November 27 – Twista, American rapper and record producer
- November 28 – Jade Puget (AFI)
- December 4
  - Kate Rusby, English folk singer-songwriter
  - Tyra Banks, American model and TV personality
- December 5
  - Neil Codling, English musician and singer (Suede)
  - Nature, American rapper (The Firm)
- December 7
  - Chantelle Barry, Australian singer-songwriter and actress
  - Damien Rice, Irish singer-songwriter, musician and record producer
- December 8 – Corey Taylor, vocalist of Slipknot
- December 9 - Bárbara Padilla, operatic soprano
- December 11 – Mos Def, rapper
- December 16 – Mariza, fado singer
- December 17 – Eddie Fisher, pop rock drummer and songwriter (OneRepublic)
- December 21 – Karmen Stavec, Slovenian musician and singer
- December 22 – Sarina Paris, Canadian singer
- December 27 – Kristoffer Zegers, Dutch composer
- December 29 – Pimp C, American rapper (d. 2007)
- December 30 – Jon Theodore, American drummer (Queens of the Stone Age)
- unknown date – Xian Zhang, Chinese-born orchestral conductor

== Deaths ==
- January 16 – Clara Ward, gospel singer, 48 (stroke)
- January 23 – Kid Ory, jazz trombonist and bandleader, 86
- February 3 – Andy Razaf, composer, poet and lyricist, 77
- February 5 – Kathleen Riddick, British conductor, 65
- February 7 – Pixinguinha, choro composer and woodwind player, 75
- February 19
  - Joseph Szigeti, violinist, 80
  - Leon Washington, jazz saxophonist, 63 (leukemia)
- February 24 – Manolo Caracol, Spanish flamenco singer (b. 1909)
- February 28 – Terig Tucci, Argentine composer, violinist, pianist and mandolinist, 75
- March 5 – Michael Jeffery, English personal manager of Jimi Hendrix, 39 (air crash)
- March 8 – Ron Pigpen McKernan, American musician and songwriter (Grateful Dead), 27 (stomach hemorrhage)
- March 14 – Rafael Godoy, Colombian composer, 65
- March 19 – Lauritz Melchior, Danish-born American Wagnerian tenor, 82
- March 26
  - Safford Cape, American composer and musicologist, 66
  - Noël Coward, English composer and dramatist, 73
- March 28 – Gertrude Johnson, Australian coloratura soprano, 78
- April 2 – Achim Stoia, Romanian composer and conductor, 62
- April 16
  - Nino Bravo, Spanish singer, 28 (car accident)
  - Istvan Kertesz, Hungarian conductor, 43 (drowned)
- April 18 – Willie 'The Lion' Smith, US jazz pianist, 79
- May 9
  - Owen Brannigan, singer
  - Mark Wessel, pianist and composer, 79
- May 21 – Vaughn Monroe, US singer and bandleader, 61
- May 27 – Ilona Kabos, Hungarian-British pianist and teacher, 79
- May 29 – P. Ramlee, Malaysian film actor, director, singer, songwriter, composer, and producer, 44 (heart attack)
- June 4 – Murry Wilson, musician and record producer, 55
- June 8 – Tubby Hayes, jazz musician, 38 (during heart surgery)
- June 29 – Germán Valdés, Mexican actor, singer and comedian (hepatitis)
- July 2 – Betty Grable, US actress and singer, 56 (lung cancer)
- July 3 – Karel Ančerl, conductor, 65
- July 6 – Otto Klemperer, conductor, 88
- July 11 – Alexander Mosolov, Russian composer, 72
- July 15 – Clarence White, guitarist (The Byrds), 29 (road accident)
- August 2 – Rosetta Pampanini, operatic soprano, 76
- August 4 – Eddie Condon, jazz banjoist and guitarist, 67
- August 6 – Memphis Minnie, blues singer and guitarist, 76
- August 16 – Astra Desmond, operatic contralto, 80
- August 17
  - Jean Barraqué, French classical composer, 45
  - Paul Williams, baritone singer and co-founder of the Motown group, The Temptations, 34 (suicide by gunshot)
- August 19 – Brew Moore, jazz saxophonist, 49 (fell downstairs)
- September 1 – Graziella Pareto, operatic soprano, 84
- September 6 – Sir William Henry Harris, organist and composer, 90
- September 10 – Allan Gray, composer, 71
- September 11 – Martha Angelici, operatic soprano, 66
- September 16 – Víctor Jara, Chilean folk singer, 40 (murdered)
- September 17– Hugo Winterhalter, US conductor and arranger, 53
- September 19 – Gram Parsons, guitarist/vocalist, 26 (drug overdose)
- September 20
  - Jim Croce, 30, singer-songwriter and
  - Maury Muehleisen, 24, multi-instrumentalist and songwriter (plane crash)
  - Ben Webster, jazz saxophonist, 64
- October 9 – Sister Rosetta Tharpe, gospel singer, 58
- October 16
  - Gene Krupa, drummer, 64
  - Jorge Peña Hen, composer, 45
- October 22 – Pablo Casals, cellist, 95
- October 27 – Norman Allin, English singer, 88
- October 28 – Mária Gyurkovics, Hungarian soprano, 58
- November 10
  - Zeke Zettner (The Stooges), 25 (heroin overdose)
  - David "Stringbean" Akeman, country banjo player and comedian, 57 (murdered)
- November 18 – Alois Hába, composer, 80
- November 23 – De De Pierce, jazz trumpeter, 69
- November 26 – Edith Mason, operatic soprano, 81
- November 27 – Frank Christian, jazz trumpeter, 85
- December 13 – Fanny Heldy, operatic soprano, 85
- December 20 – Bobby Darin, American singer and actor, 37 (heart failure)
- December 31 – Emile Christian, jazz trombonist, 78
- date unknown – Cäwdät Fäyzi, Tatar composer and folklorist

== Awards ==
=== Grammy Awards ===
- Grammy Awards of 1973

=== Country Music Association Awards ===
- Entertainer of the Year: Roy Clark
- Male Vocalist of the Year: Charlie Rich
- Female Vocalist of the Year: Loretta Lynn
- Song of the Year: Kenny O'Dell – "Behind Closed Doors"
- Album of the Year: Behind Closed Doors

=== Eurovision Song Contest ===
- Eurovision Song Contest 1973
