= Living Together, Growing Together (album) =

Eighth studio album by The 5th Dimension

Studio album by The 5th Dimension
- Released: March 1, 1973
- Recorded: Wally Heider Studios
- Studios: Wally Heider Recording, Hollywood, Calif.
- Label: Bell
- Producer: Bones Howe

The 5th Dimension chronology
Individually & Collectively (1972)	Living Together, Growing Together (1973)	Soul & Inspiration (1974)

Professional ratings
Review scores
Source	Rating
AllMusic	3/5 stars

Living Together, Growing Together is the eighth studio album by the American pop group The 5th Dimension. It was released on March 1, 1973. Living Together, Growing Together reached No. 108 on the Billboard Top LPs chart, and No. 25 on Billboard's R&B albums chart. The album includes the early World Beat composition, "Woyaya", originally recorded by the British-Ghanaian-Caribbean ensemble Osibisa, in 1971. The song was also covered in 1973 by Art Garfunkel on his debut solo album Angel Clare.

The 5th Dimension founder, LeMonte McLemore, gave the Living Together, Growing Together album period a largely unfavorable mention in his autobiography, From Hobo Flats to The 5th Dimension - A Life Fulfilled in Baseball, Photography, and Music:

I'll speak for myself (but probably for some of the other members) when I say it ["Living Together, Growing Together"] was the worst single we ever put out. "Living Together, Growing Together" came from a bomb of a movie, '73's musical remake of Lost Horizon, and we were strong-armed into covering it, as Bell Records was a subsidiary of Columbia Pictures, who produced the film. While we tried our best to put life into a basically bland choral arrangement for a soulless choir, even the tune's composer, Burt Bacharach, is quoted as calling the entire movie's notion a "giant bust." Conversely, besides the "Living Together, Growing Together" album's meaningful "Ashes to Ashes," I liked the "havin' church," revival-meeting feel of "Day By Day" from Broadway's Godspell, which we had the opportunity to present in our live concerts, too.

After the "Living Together, Growing Together" fiasco we seemed jinxed; we just couldn't find the right material for the next hit. People were bringing us boxes of songs, and even more songs, and we just couldn't find a thing. And I think that's what helped Marilyn and Billy make their decision to go out on their own.

This album began the vocal group's somewhat unintentional transition to mainly adult contemporary fare, as they would never again prove noteworthy on the Billboard pop charts.

== Singles ==
Three singles were released from Living Together, Growing Together in the United States:

- "Living Together, Growing Together" b/w "What Do I Need to Be Me" reached No. 32 on the Billboard Hot 100 and No. 5 on the Easy Listening chart.
- "Everything's Been Changed" b/w "There Never Was a Day" reached No. 70 on the Billboard Hot 100 and No. 18 on the Easy Listening chart.
- "Ashes to Ashes" b/w "The Singer" (from "Love's Lines, Angles and Rhymes") reached No. 52 on the Billboard Hot 100, No. 54 on the Billboard Hot R&B chart, and No. 7 on the Easy Listening chart.

== Track listing ==
Side A

1. "Open Your Window" (Harry Nilsson)
2. "Ashes to Ashes" (Brian Potter, Dennis Lambert)
3. "Everything's Been Changed" (Paul Anka)
4. "The Riverwitch" (Jeffrey Comanor)
5. "Living Together, Growing Together" (Burt Bacharach, Hal David)

Side B

1. "Day by Day" (Stephen Schwartz)
2. "There's Nothin' Like Music" (Jeffrey Comanor)
3. "What Do I Need to Be Me" (Bobby Arvon)
4. "There Never Was a Day" (Randy McNeill)
5. "Let Me Be Lonely" (Burt Bacharach, Hal David)
6. "Woyaya (Amao, Tontoh, Bailey, Bedeau, Amarfio, Osei, Richardson)

== Personnel ==
=== The 5th Dimension ===
- Marilyn McCoo – Soprano voice, lead vocals (track A1), background vocals
- Florence LaRue – Alto voice, lead vocals (track B4) , background vocals
- Billy Davis Jr. – Baritone voice, lead vocals (tracks A4, B1, B3), background vocals
- Ron Townson – Tenor voice, lead vocals (track B2), background vocals
- Lamonte McLemore – Baritone and bass voice, background vocals

=== Instrumentalists ===
- Hal Blaine, Earl Palmer – drums
- Joe Osborn – bass guitar
- Larry Knechtel – organ, electric piano, piano
- Artie Butler, Jimmy Rowles – piano
- Dennis Budimir, Larry Carlton, Jeffrey Comanor, Tommy Tedesco – guitar
- Zavier – twelve-string guitar
- King Errisson – congas (track B6)
- Paul Humphrey – drums (track B6)
- Max Bennett – bass guitar (track B6)
- Larry Bunker – Afro percussion
- Bob Alcivar – conductor
- Tom Scott – tenor saxophone (track B6)
- Bud Brisbois – trumpet (track B6)
- Clarence McDonald – organ (track B6)

=== Production ===
- Producer – Bones Howe
- Engineer – Bones Howe
- Assistant engineers – Ed Barton, Ken Caillat
- Vocal arranger – Bob Alcivar
- Accompanied by, Orchestra – The 5th Dimension Studio Orchestra
- Art direction – Beverly Weinstein
- Concertmaster – Sid Sharp
- Coordinator [Production Co-ordination] – Pam Vale
- Album design – Kaleidoscope
- Horn arrangement on "Woyaya" – Tom Scott

== Reception ==
Lindsay Planer of AllMusic rated the album three out of five stars, saying the band "[sounded] splendid."

== Chart performance ==
=== Album ===
Chart peaks for Living Together, Growing Together
Chart (1973)	Peak position
CAN RPM Top 100 Albums	77
US Billboard Top LP's & Tape	108
US Billboard Best-Selling Soul LP's	25
US Cashbox Top 100 Albums	74

=== Singles ===
Year	Song	Chart	Peak position
1973	"Living Together, Growing Together"	Billboard Hot 100	32
1973	"Everything's Been Changed"	Billboard Hot 100	70
1973	"Ashes to Ashes"	Billboard Hot 100	52
