= Op. 113 =

In music, Op. 113 stands for Opus number 113. Compositions that are assigned this number include:

- Arnold – Symphony No. 7
- Beethoven – The Ruins of Athens
- Schumann – Märchenbilder
- Shostakovich – Symphony No. 13
