= Pholas Dactylus (band) =

Pholas Dactylus is an Italian avant-prog band active in the 1970s. The name is that of a shell.

The band was formed around 1972 by Bergamo's musicians, coming from two previously existing ones, with the name of Spectre. After intense live activity, in 1973 they released their sole LP, Concerto delle menti ("Concerto of minds"): this a rather experimental, avantgarde work including Biblical, mythological and science fiction influences, marked by a strong symbolism.

Though full of suggestion and praised by critics, the album had little success and the band split up due to financial problems.

== Line up ==
- Paolo Carella – voice
- Valentino Galbusera – keyboards
- Maurizio Pancotti – keyboards
- Eleino Colledet – guitars
- Rinaldo Linati – bass
- Giampiero Nava – drums
