= Symphony No. 7 (Arnold) =

Symphony by Malcolm Arnold

Cover of the printed score of Malcolm Arnold's Symphony No. 7

The Symphony No. 7, Op. 113 by Malcolm Arnold was finished in 1973. It is in three movements:

1. Allegro energico ("Katherine")
2. Andante con moto – Molto vivace – Lento ("Robert")
3. Allegro – Allegretto – Allegro – Allegretto – Allegro ("Edward")

The score was largely written at Sir William Walton's home La Mortella on Ischia. Each movement is a portrait of one of his three children, to whom the work is dedicated. The work was commissioned by the New Philharmonia Orchestra.

It was premiered by the composer on 5 May 1974 with the New Philharmonia Orchestra at the Royal Festival Hall.

As of 2016, the manuscript is on deposit in the library of Eton College, having been discovered by Arnold's daughter for sale on eBay.

== Instrumentation ==
The symphony is scored for 2 flutes, piccolo, 2 oboes, 2 clarinets, 2 bassoons, contrabassoon, 4 horns, 3 trumpets, 3 trombones, tuba, timpani, bass drum, snare drum, tam-tam, cymbals (crash and suspended), wood block, whip, 2 cowbells, conga, bongos, 2 timbales, tubular bells, tenor drum, harp and strings.

== Commercial recordings ==
- 1991 Vernon Handley and the Royal Philharmonic Orchestra on Conifer Records 74321-15005-2 (re-released on Decca 4765337)
- 2001 Andrew Penny and the RTÉ National Symphony Orchestra on Naxos Records 8.552001 (recorded 21–22 February 2000, in the presence of the composer)
- 2001 Rumon Gamba and the BBC Philharmonic Orchestra on Chandos Records CHAN 9967
- 2015 Martin Yates and the Royal Scottish National Orchestra on Dutton Vocalion Dutton Epoch CDLX7318
