= Everything's Been Changed =

Single by The 5th Dimension

from the album Living Together, Growing Together
- B-side: "There Was Never a Day"
- Released: March 1973
- Genre: Soul
- Length: 3:47
- Label: Bell
- Songwriter(s): Paul Anka
- Producer(s): Bones Howe

The 5th Dimension singles chronology
"Living Together, Growing Together" (1972)	"Everything's Been Changed" (1973)	"Ashes to Ashes" (1973)

"Everything's Been Changed" is a song written by Paul Anka and performed by The 5th Dimension. The song was produced by Bones Howe and arranged by Bill Holman, Bob Alcivar, and Howe.

== Chart performance ==
It reached #17 on the Canadian adult contemporary chart, #18 on the U.S. adult contemporary chart, #49 on the Canadian pop chart, and #70 on the Billboard Hot 100 in 1973. It was featured on their 1973 album, Living Together, Growing Together.

== Other versions ==
- Anka released the original version of the song as the B-side to his 1972 single, "Jubilation".
- Anne Murray released a version of the song on her 1972 album, Annie.
