= Tenth Floor =

Gay nightclub in New York City

Coordinates: 40°44′43″N 73°59′37″W

The Tenth Floor was a members-only gay nightclub in the Chelsea neighborhood of New York City that was open from 1972 to 1973. The club attracted a wealthy white gay male clientele and was based in a former industrial building in two small rooms.

== History ==
It opened in December 1972 and was located on the 10th floor of a former industrial building at 151 West 25th Street in Manhattan. The club had minimal decoration. It was established by David Bruie, Jim Jessup and David Sokoloff. In spring and winter Ray Yeats was the DJ. The club had space for about 200 patrons in "two smallish rooms". It was only open on the weekends. The club closed in spring 1973. The Tenth Floor was portrayed as the "Twelfth Floor" in Andrew Holleran's 1978 novel Dancer from the Dance.

Favored records among the Tenth Floor patrons included "Think (About It)" by Lyn Collins and "Make Me Believe in You" by Patti Jo.

== Clientele ==
The club was aimed at white gay men. In his book 33 Revolutions per Minute, Dorian Lynskey described the club as "unashamedly elitist and profoundly caucasian". Dancing was seen as secondary to cruising. The membership basis for entry was inspired by David Mancuso's The Loft nightclub, which enabled events to be held in a private apartment to circumvent the New York City Cabaret Law. Only non-alcoholic drinks were permitted to be served to comply with the law. The founders of the Tenth Floor consulted Mancuso and told him that they wanted to establish "a Loft-style party that would be strictly gay and white". The club catered to a wealthy white gay "elite" where "attitude (and sex) trumped partying" according to cultural historian Alice Echols. The patrons of the Tenth Floor were pioneers of the "Castro clone" style of the early 1970s. Topless dancing at the Tenth Floor and the Flamingo Club may have led to the promotion of "sculpted pectoral muscles" becoming "one of the main attributes of gay male desirability".

In an article on the origins of disco for The Advocate, Robert Hofler wrote that the club was associated with the Fire Island Pines "crowd" and that the club "really got going after 3am". The members of the club referred to themselves as "the 500" in their belief that they were, according to dance historian Tim Lawrence, "the 500 most desirable (creative, stylish, attractive, successful, knowing, etc.) gay men in New York". Following the closure of the club, a lot of patrons frequented events hosted by George‐Paul Rosell before the opening of the Flamingo club in 1974. In Guy Trebay's 2024 memoir, Coming of Age Amid the Glitter and Doom of '70s New York, he recalls working at the Tenth Floor and described the crowd as "slick and professional gay men who obviously had money", and that they were known as "Pines queens" after their association with Fire Island Pines.
