= Living Together, Growing Together =

- Spanish release picture sleeve

Single by The 5th Dimension

from the album Living Together, Growing Together
- B-side: "What Do I Need to Be Me"
- Released: December 1972
- Genre: Soul
- Length: 3:50
- Label: Bell
- Songwriters: Burt Bacharach, Hal David
- Producer: Bones Howe

The 5th Dimension singles chronology
"If I Could Reach You" (1972)	"Living Together, Growing Together" (1972)	"Everything's Been Changed" (1973)

"Living Together, Growing Together" is a song written by Burt Bacharach and Hal David for the 1973 film Lost Horizon, and originally performed by James Shigeta and the Shangri-La chorus in the film.

== Fifth Dimension recording ==
"Living Together, Growing Together" had commercial success as a single performed by The 5th Dimension. The single, produced by Bones Howe and arranged by Bob Alcivar and Artie Butler, reached #5 on the U.S. adult contemporary chart, #9 on the Canadian adult contemporary chart, and #32 on the Billboard Hot 100 in 1973, marking the band's last Top 40 hit. It was featured on their 1973 album, Living Together, Growing Together.

== Other versions ==
- Tony Bennett featuring The Mike Curb Congregation released a version of the song as a single in 1972 that reached #111 on the Billboard chart.
- Ferrante & Teicher released a version of the song on their 1973 album, Killing Me Softly.
- Bacharach released his own version of the song on his 1973 album Living Together.
