= Ashes to Ashes (The 5th Dimension song) =

Single by The 5th Dimension

from the album Living Together, Growing Together
- B-side: "The Singer"
- Released: July 1973
- Genre: Soul
- Length: 3:30
- Label: Bell
- Songwriters: Dennis Lambert, Brian Potter
- Producer: Bones Howe

The 5th Dimension singles chronology
"Everything's Been Changed" (1973)	"Ashes to Ashes" (1973)	"Flashback" (1973)

"Ashes to Ashes" is a song written by Dennis Lambert and Brian Potter and performed by The 5th Dimension. It reached #7 on both the Canadian adult contemporary and the U.S. adult contemporary charts, #50 on the Canadian pop chart, #52 on the Billboard Hot 100, and #54 on the U.S. R&B chart in 1973. It was featured on their 1973 album, Living Together, Growing Together.

The song was produced by Bones Howe and arranged by Rene DeKnight.

== Other versions ==
- Lambert released the original version of the song as the B-side to his 1972 single, "Dream On".
