= Losin' Streak (album) =

Studio album by Ray Stevens
- Released: March 1973
- Studio: Ray Stevens Sound Laboratory, Nashville, Tennessee
- Genre: Pop; adult contemporary; country
- Label: Barnaby (Issued on the CBS label)
- Producer: Ray Stevens

Ray Stevens chronology
Turn Your Radio On (1972)	Losin' Streak (1973)	Nashville (1973)

Losin' Streak is Ray Stevens' ninth studio album and his fourth for Barnaby Records, released in 1973. The second track is a re-recording of one of Stevens' songs that was included on his second album, This Is Ray Stevens (1963). Cover versions include the Everly Brothers' hit "Bye Bye Love" and singer/songwriter Freddie Hart's hit "Easy Lovin'". Both the album and the title track (the album's sole single) did not chart.

In 1974, the third track from this album, "Inside", was released along with a non-album track entitled "Everybody Needs a Rainbow" as a double A-side single.

The front and back of the album each contain one photo of Stevens playing the piano and singing into a microphone at a recording studio.

== Track listing ==
Side 1
No.	Title	Writer(s)	Length
1.	"Losin' Streak"	Nick Van Maarth	4:08
2.	"Just One of Life's Little Tragedies"	Ray Stevens	3:02
3.	"Inside"	Ray Stevens	3:44
4.	"Things Work Out"	Tupper Saussy	2:44
5.	"Bye Bye Love"	Boudleaux Bryant, Felice Bryant	4:06

Side 2
No.	Title	Writer(s)	Length
1.	"Being Friends"	Layng Martine, Jr.	2:53
2.	"Idaho Wine"	Layng Martine, Jr.	2:20
3.	"This Is Your Life"	Ray Stevens	3:16
4.	"Laid Back"	Ray Stevens	2:51
5.	"Easy Lovin'"	Freddie Hart	2:51
6.	"What Do You Know"	Ray Stevens	3:24

== Personnel ==
- Ray Stevens – producer
- Ben Tallent – engineer
- John Donegan – photography

== Charts ==
Singles – Billboard (North America)

Year	Single	Chart	Position
1974	"Everybody Needs a Rainbow" / "Inside"	Canadian RPM Adult Contemporary Tracks	16
1974	"Everybody Needs a Rainbow" / "Inside"	Billboard Adult Contemporary	18
1974	"Everybody Needs a Rainbow" / "Inside"	Billboard Hot Country Singles & Tracks	37
