= Jacopo Gianninoto =

- Jacopo Gianninoto in H.ER.O.M.E.TIC

Background information
- Born: Jacopo Gianninoto; 23 May 1973 (age 53); Padua, Italy
- Genres: Art music, Baroque, Renaissance
- Occupations: Musician, composer
- Instruments: Lute, guitar
- Years active: 1997–present
- Website: http://jacopo.gianninoto.it

Jacopo Gianninoto is an Italian lutenist, guitarist and composer living in Bangkok, Thailand.

He has published a series of books of transcriptions of ancient music for Lute, Baroque guitar and Theorbo, adapted for classical guitar, contributing to the rediscovery of ancient Italian repertoire. His publishing work include a revision for guitar of the Antonio Vivaldi's "Concerto per due Violini Leuto e Basso RV93", a transcription for guitar of the J.S. Bach's sonatas originally written for solo violin, works on Vincenzo Galilei (father of the scientist Galileo Galilei), Johannes Hieronymus Kapsberger, Francesco Corbetta, Johannes Matelart, Alessandro Piccinini, Francesco Spinacino, Vincenzo Capirola and S.L. Weiss.

Gianninoto performs mainly in Europe and South-East Asia, and has published several LP albums, both as a performer and as a composer and he is the creator and director of several artistic multidisciplinary projects such as "Baroque Me Baby", "Renaissance Redux", "The Praise of Folly", "The Giordano Bruno Project", "Lux In Tenebris", "Chiaroscuro", "Herometic", often mixing theatre, music, visual art, poetry including his collaboration with thai writer S.P. Somtow and several theatre and dance companies.
