= Concerto delle menti =

Studio album by Pholas Dactylus
- Released: 1973
- Recorded: 1973
- Studio: Studio G, Genoa
- Genre: Avant-garde progressive rock
- Length: 53:05
- Label: Magma Records
- Producer: Vittorio De Scalzi

Concerto delle menti ("Concerto of minds") is a progressive rock album released in 1973 by Italian band Pholas Dactylus. It was produced by Vittorio De Scalzi, a member of the New Trolls band.

The work revolves around a bizarre history rich of visionary symbolism, dealing with an apocalyptic end of Earth, full of Biblical and mythological visions. Authors like Henry Miller and Baudelaire has been cited as inspiration for the lyrics. The album is introduced by a long voice declamation ("Soon you'll be aboard a tramway..."). After several minutes the music evolves gradually into a full sway with what would have a been a single suite if not to the technical limits of old LPs. The music sometimes resembles Gentle Giant or ELP's one. It includes passages of total improvisation.

== Track listing ==
1. "Concerto delle menti - Parte 1" – 29:15
2. "Concerto delle menti - Parte 2" – 23:50

== Personnel ==
- Paolo Carelli - voice
- Eleino Colladet - guitars
- Valentino Galbusera - keyboards
- Rinaldo Linati - bass
- Giampiero Nava - drums
- Maurizio Pancotti - keyboards
