= Baby It's You! =

Jukebox musical

- The Musical
- Music: Various Artists
- Lyrics: Various Artists
- Book: Floyd Mutrux; Colin Escott
- Basis: The life and career of Florence Greenberg
- Productions: 2009 Los Angeles; 2009 Pasadena; 2011 Broadway

Baby It's You! is a jukebox musical written by Floyd Mutrux and Colin Escott, featuring pop and rock hits of the 1960s, with a special emphasis on songs by the Shirelles and other acts signed to Scepter Records. The show "tells the story of Florence Greenberg and Scepter Records, the label Greenberg started when she signed the Shirelles." After several tryouts and premieres, the show debuted on Broadway in April 2011, directed by Sheldon Epps.

== Background ==
=== Greenberg and the Shirelles ===
The Shirelles were an American girl group in the early 1960s, and the first to have a number one single on the Billboard Hot 100. The members of the quartet were Shirley Owens (the main lead singer), Doris Coley, Beverly Lee, and Addie "Micki" Harris.

Florence Greenberg (September 16, 1913 – November 2, 1995) originally created Tiara Records. The first song recorded and released on the label was "I Met Him On a Sunday", by the Shirelles. Just as the record started to break locally, Greenberg sold the company with the Shirelles' contract to Decca Records for US$4000. With that money, she started a new label in 1959, called Scepter Records, which became one of the leading record labels in the 60s.

=== Mutrux and Escott's collaborations ===
Mutrux and Escott had collaborated on the book for the Broadway musical Million Dollar Quartet, which was nominated for a Tony Award for Best Musical and Best Book of a Musical. Mutrux, who knew about Florence Greenberg, conceived Baby It's You! The Musical, which is part of Mutrux's planned "American Pop Anthology" series, focusing on American music from the 1950s to the 1980s. Million Dollar Quartet was also part of this series.

=== Involvement of Epps ===
Epps is director of the Pasadena Playhouse. In late 2009, one of the shows scheduled to play there suddenly closed:

". . . I'd heard several good things about a smaller workshop production of this show that was at the Coast Playhouse in West Hollywood. I did a little reading about the subject matter — about the Shirelles and Florence Greenberg and all of that — and went over to see it. I was very taken with it and very taken with the idea of developing it for a larger venue, so we were able to make an arrangement to make it the last show of our season."

This is not the first jukebox musical Epps had worked on: he directed Play On!, with Duke Ellington songs, and Blues in the Night.

== Synopsis ==
Florence Greenberg is an average New Jersey housewife. A talent show is held at her daughter's school, and a group of African-American girls are preparing to perform. Florence's daughter is surprised at their talent, quickly notifying her mother, and Florence decides to make the group recording artists. To accommodate them, she founds Scepter Records. After the success of the Shirelles, the new name of the group, Florence and Scepter Records go on to "discover recording artists like the Kingsmen, the Isley Brothers and Dionne Warwick."

== Musical numbers ==
Act I

- Mr. Lee – Company
- Book of Love – Company
- Rockin' Robin – Company
- Dance With Me – Company
- Mama Said – Florence
- Yakety Yak – Bernie
- Get a Job – Stanley
- The Stroll – Orchestra
- I Met Him on a Sunday – Shirley, Beverly, Doris and Micki
- Dedicated to the One I Love – Florence, Stan, Shirley, Beverly, Doris and Micki
- 16 Candles – Florence
- Tonight's the Night – Luther, Shirley, Beverly, Doris and Micki
- Dedicated to the One I Love (Reprise) – Florence and Stanley
- Since I Don't Have You – Chuck Jackson
- Big John (Ain't You Gonna Marry Me) – Shirley, Beverly, Doris and Micki
- He's So Fine – Shirley, Beverly, Doris and Micki
- Soldier Boy – Florence, Luther, Shirley, Beverly, Doris and Micki
- Dedicated to the One I Love (Reprise) – Shirley, Beverly, Doris, Micki, and Company

Act II

- Shout – Ron Isley, Shirley, Beverly, Doris and Micki
- Twist And Shout – Ron Isley, Shirley, Beverly, Doris and Micki
- Mama Said (Reprise) – Shirley, Beverly, Doris, Micki, Luther and Florence
- Mr. Bassman – Johnny Cymbal and Bass Men
- Duke of Earl – Gene Chandler, Shirley, Micki, Beverly and Doris
- Foolish Little Girl – Shirley, Beverly, Doris and Micki
- It's My Party – Lesley Gore
- Our Day Will Come – Ruby & the Romantics
- The Dark End of the Street – Luther, Florence, Chuck Jackson and Shirley
- Rhythm of the Rain – Stanley, Mary Jane and Florence
- You're So Fine – Chuck Jackson, Shirley, Beverly, Doris and Micki
- Hey Paula – Chuck Jackson, Shirley, Beverly, Doris and Micki
- Louie Louie – Kingsmen, Chuck Jackson, Shirley, Beverly, Doris and Micki
- You Really Got a Hold on Me – Chuck Jackson, Beverly, Shirley, Micki, Doris, Mary Jane and Florence
- Baby It's You – Shirley, Beverly, Doris, Micki, Florence and Luther
- Any Day Now – Chuck Jackson
- A Thing of the Past – Beverly, Micki and Shirley
- Don't Make Me Over – Dionne Warwick and Florence
- Walk On By – Dionne Warwick, Florence and Luther
- Baby It's You (Reprise) – Shirley, Beverly, Doris and Micki
- Tonight's the Night (Reprise) – Shirley, Beverly, Doris and Micki
- Dedicated to the One I Love (Reprise) – Shirley, Beverly, Doris, Micki and Florence
- I Say a Little Prayer – Company

== Original Broadway cast ==
Character	Original Cast
Florence Greenberg	Beth Leavel
Luther Dixon	Allan Louis
Shirley Owens±	Christina Sajous
Doris Coley±	Crystal Starr Knighton
Addie "Micki" Harris±	Erica Ash
Beverly Lee±	Kyra Da Costa
Bernie Greenberg	Barry Pearl
Mary Jane Greenberg	Kelli Barrett
Stanley Greenberg	Brandon Uranowitz
Chuck Jackson	Geno Henderson
Ensemble	Erica Dorfler
Ensemble	Jahi A. Kearse

±Denotes that character is a member of the Shirelles.

== Productions ==
=== California (2009) ===
The show premiered at the Coast Playhouse in Los Angeles on July 18, 2009, playing until August 30, 2009, choreographed by Birgitte Mutrux, directed by Floyd Mutrux, and starring Meeghan Holaway. Other cast members included Erica Ash and Barry Pearl. Another production with the same cast played at the Pasadena Playhouse from November 13, 2009, to December 13, 2009.

=== Broadway (2011) ===
The show opened on Broadway at the Broadhurst Theatre, starring Beth Leavel as Florence, directed by Sheldon Epps, and with musical supervision and arrangements by Rahn Coleman. Baby It's You! began previews on March 26, 2011, and officially opened on April 27, with choreography by Brigitte Mutrux, orchestrations by Don Sebesky, scenic design by Anna Louizos, costume design by Lizz Wolf, lighting design by Howell Binkley, and projection design by Jason H. Thompson. Joining Leavel as the Shirelles were Christina Sajous, Erica Ash, Kyra DaCosta, and Crystal Starr Knighton. The production closed on September 4, 2011.

== Response ==
Entertainment Weekly's Clark Collis gave the musical a "B−" rating, calling it "a night out that is easy on the ear ... 'Baby It's You' gives Leavel, a Tony Award-winner for The Drowsy Chaperone, a platform for both her vocal and her dramatic talents ... [T]he quartet playing the Shirelles are given little to do but capably sing and dance their way through the group's repertoire while breaking a succession of costume change land speed records. But there is never any doubt that the main attractions here ARE the hits — this is a jukebox musical so unashamed about its nature that it starts with the projected image of an actual jukebox."

Charles Isherwood in The New York Times called the production "dismal" and criticized the "[i]nvitations to sing along" and the "inducements to wallow in visions of happy yesterdays".

Steven Suskin in Variety unfavorably compared the show to Jersey Boys: "Imagine [the latter] without the carefully integrated character development of Frankie Valli and Bob Gaudio, and with a tunestack only one quarter as imperishable. You needn't imagine it; just wander to the Broadhurst for Baby It's You!" He further stated that Leavel did a capable job filling a poorly scripted role.

In the Chicago Tribune, Chris Jones wrote, "The Shirelles, one of the greatest girl groups of all time, get a show of such total ineptitude and cynical profiteering that your mouth pretty much dangles open in disbelief for the duration of the entire tawdry proceedings." Linda Winer (Newsday) said of the show: "[I]t's just another jukebox musical."

== Awards and nominations ==
Year	Award	Category	Nominee	Result
2011	Drama Desk Award	Outstanding Actress in a Musical	Beth Leavel	Nominated
2011	Tony Award	Best Performance by a Leading Actress in a Musical	Beth Leavel	Nominated

== Recordings ==
An original Broadway cast recording was released by Universal Music Group on June 14, 2011. The album, recorded from April 17 to 25, 2011, is produced by Richard Perry and associate-produced by Rahn Coleman.

== 2011 lawsuit ==
On April 27, 2011, the date the production opened on Broadway, it was announced that a personality rights lawsuit against the play's producers had been filed with the Supreme Court of the State of New York. The suit alleged unauthorized and uncompensated use of the names, likenesses, and biographical information of Beverly Lee (a surviving member of The Shirelles who owns the trademark to the group's name); late Shirelles members Doris Coley Jackson and Addie Harris Jackson; Dionne Warwick; and Chuck Jackson. The suit sought damages on the plaintiffs' behalf. (The other surviving member of the original Shirelles, Shirley Alston Reeves, was not named as a plaintiff.) On December 15, 2011, a federal judge asserted that the suit be discontinued after both sides agreed to settle.
