= The Shirelles and King Curtis Give a Twist Party =

Studio album by King Curtis and The Shirelles
- Released: 1962
- Genre: Girl group
- Length: 30:01
- Language: English
- Label: Scepter
- Producer: Luther Dixon; Bob Irwin

King Curtis and The Shirelles chronology
| The Shirelles Sing to Trumpets and Strings (1961) | The Shirelles and King Curtis Give a Twist Party (1962) | Baby It's You (1962) |

The Shirelles and King Curtis Give a Twist Party is a 1962 collaborative album between American blues and rhythm and blues saxophonist King Curtis and girl group The Shirelles. In 1968, the album was re-released as Eternally Soul.

== Reception ==
Editors of AllMusic Guide gave this album three out of five stars, with critic Richie Unterberger characterizing the release as "respectable but not terribly exciting, and a bit schizo in concept", due to alternating tracks between the musical acts rather than having them collaborate directly. In a review of reissues for Billboard, Chris Morris called this album a "bopping session".

== Track listing ==
1. "Mama Here Comes the Bride" (Luther Dixon and Jerome Richardson) – 2:26
2. "Take the Last Train Home" (Instrumental) (Dixson and Curtis Ousley) – 3:06
3. "Welcome Home, Baby" (Dixon) – 2:32
4. "I've Got a Woman" (Ray Charles) – 4:58
5. "I Still Want You" (Dixson and Ousley) – 2:29
6. "Take the Last Train Home" (Vocal) (Dixson and Ousley) – 1:56
7. "Love Is a Swinging Thing" (Willie Denson, Dixon, and Shirley Owens) – 2:12
8. "Ooh Poo Pah Doo" (Jessie Hill) – 2:19
9. "New Orleans" (Ousley) – 3:25
10. "Mister Twister" (Otis Blackwell) – 2:29
11. "Potato Chips" (Ousley) – 2:37

== Personnel ==
- King Curtis – saxophone, vocals

The Shirelles

- Doris Coley – lead and backing vocals
- Addie "Micki" Harris – lead and backing vocals
- Beverly Lee – lead and backing vocals
- Shirley Owens – lead and backing vocals

Additional personnel

- Luther Dixon – engineering, production
- Ira Howard – liner notes
- Bob Irwin – production
- Jeff Smith – design

== See also ==
- List of 1962 albums
