= Hear & Now (Shirelles album) =

Studio album by The Shirelles
- Released: 1965
- Recorded: 1962–1963
- Genre: Girl group
- Length: 30:28
- Language: English
- Label: Pricewise, a division of Scepter
- Producer: Luther Dixon; Bob Irwin

The Shirelles chronology
The Shirelles Sing the Golden Oldies (1964)	Hear & Now (1965)	Swing the Most (1965)

Hear & Now is a 1965 studio album by American girl group The Shirelles.

== Reception ==
Editors of AllMusic Guide scored this release 3.5 out of five stars, with critic Richie Unterberger noting that "the music was fairly good" on this budget release of outtakes from previous recording sessions.

== Track listing ==
1. "Happy Birthday" – 2:57
2. "Tonight You're Gonna Fall in Love With Me" (Artie Kornfeld and Toni Wine) – 2:57
3. "Maybe Tonight" (Van McCoy) – 2:32
4. "Make the Night a Little Longer" (Gerry Goffin and Carole King) – 2:18
5. "Dooms Day" (Don Covay and Luther Dixon) – 2:35
6. "Sha La La" (Robert Mosely and Robert Taylor) – 2:15
7. "Don't Say Goodnight and Mean Goodbye" (Jon De Angelis and Charles Partree) – 2:39
8. "Lost Love" (Larry Harrison and Jimmy Williams) – 2:40
9. "Only Time Will Tell" (J. W. Alexander and Sam Cooke) – 2:43
10. "Hard Times" (Jackie Ross) – 2:23
11. "The Gospel Truth" (Mike Anthony, Barry Mann, and Cynthia Weil) – 2:02
12. "Not for All the Money in the World" (Ron Miller and Lee Porter) – 2:27

At least some pressings of the LP feature "Happy Birthday" listed on the sleeve but the song is not present on the album.

== Personnel ==
The Shirelles

- Doris Coley – lead and backing vocals
- Addie "Micki" Harris – lead and backing vocals
- Beverly Lee – lead and backing vocals
- Shirley Owens – lead and backing vocals

Additional personnel

- Luther Dixon – production
- Rock "G" – liner notes
- Bob Irwin – production

== See also ==
- List of 1965 albums
