= The Shirelles Sing to Trumpets and Strings =

Studio album by The Shirelles
- Released: June 1961
- Genre: Girl group
- Length: 29:39
- Language: English
- Label: Scepter
- Producer: Luther Dixon; Bob Irwin

The Shirelles chronology
Tonight's the Night (1960)	The Shirelles Sing to Trumpets and Strings (1961)	The Shirelles and King Curtis Give a Twist Party (1962)

The Shirelles Sing to Trumpets and Strings is the sophomore album from American soul girl group The Shirelles, released in 1961. The album has received positive reviews from critics.

== Reception ==
A review in Billboard recommended the album to retailers for the success of "Mama Said". Editors of AllMusic Guide gave this album 3.5 out of five stars, with critic Richie Unterberger noting the strong vocals of the group, but pointing out that the singles are much stronger than the other songs. The New Rolling Stone Album Guide rates this album three out of five stars, noting that this period of early Scepter albums was the band's most commercially and critically successful, due to the high-quality but risk-averse production from Luther Dixon.

== Track listing ==
1. "Mama Said" (Willie Denson and Luther Dixon) – 2:10
2. "What a Sweet Thing That Was" (Gerry Goffin and Carole King) – 2:30
3. "It's Mine" (Denson) – 2:31
4. "I Saw a Tear" (Shirley Owens) – 2:25
5. "I Don't Want to Cry" (Dixon and Chuck Jackson) – 2:18
6. "Rainbow Valley" (Dixon) – 2:59
7. "My Willow Tree" (Dixon) – 2:48
8. "The First One" (Van McCoy) – 2:20
9. "What's Mine Is Yours" (Vernon Duke and Barney Williams) – 2:18
10. "Without a Word of Complaint" (Duke Ellington, Johnny Hodges, and George David Weiss) – 2:06
11. "I'll Do the Same Thing Too" (McCoy) – 1:55
12. "Blue Holiday" (Denson and Dixon) – 3:19

A 2017 reissue from Cornbread Records (catalogue code CRNBR16023) adds the final track "Please Be My Boyfriend".

== Personnel ==
The Shirelles

- Doris Coley – lead and backing vocals
- Addie "Micki" Harris – lead and backing vocals
- Beverly Lee – lead and backing vocals
- Shirley Owens – lead and backing vocals

Additional personnel

- Luther Dixon – production
- Bob Irwin – production
- Mary Schlachter – liner notes
- Jeff Smith – design

== See also ==
- List of 1961 albums
