= Baby It's You (album) =

Studio album by The Shirelles
- Released: 1962
- Genre: R&B, pop
- Length: 28:58
- Label: Scepter
- Producer: Luther Dixon, Bob Irwin

The Shirelles chronology
The Shirelles and King Curtis Give a Twist Party (1962)	Baby It's You (1962)	Foolish Little Girl (1962)

Singles from Baby It's You
- 1. "Big John (Ain't You Gonna Marry Me)" Released: September 1961; 2. "Baby It's You" Released: 1961; 3. "Soldier Boy" Released: March 1962

Professional ratings
Review scores
Source	Rating
AllMusic	3/5 stars
The Encyclopedia of Popular Music	4/5 stars
(The New) Rolling Stone Album Guide	3/5 stars

Baby It's You is a studio album by the Shirelles, released in 1962. It contains the hits "Baby It's You" and "Soldier Boy".

== Reception ==
In his retrospective review of the release, Richie Unterberger for AllMusic wrote that "it's a pretty solid effort for its day, featuring state-of-the-art orchestral early-'60s New York girl group production and decent songwriting."

== Track listing ==
=== Side 1 ===
1. "Baby It's You" (Burt Bacharach, Mack David, Barney Williams) – 2:43
2. "Irresistible You" (Luther Dixon, Al Kasha) – 2:14
3. "The Things I Want to Hear (Pretty Words)" (Fred Anisfield, Willie Denson) – 2:42
4. "Big John (Ain't You Gonna Marry Me)" (Big John Patton, Amiel Summers, Titus Turner) – 2:20
5. "The Same Old Story" (Luther Dixon) – 2:21
6. "Voice of Experience" (Big John Patton) – 2:20

=== Side 2 ===
1. "Soldier Boy" (Luther Dixon, Florence Green) – 2:42
2. "A Thing of the Past" (Bob Brass, Irwin Levine) – 2:39
3. "Twenty-One" (Luther Dixon) – 2:02
4. "Make the Night a Little Longer" (Gerry Goffin, Carole King) – 2:32
5. "Twisting in the U.S.A." (Kal Mann) – 1:54
6. "Putty (In Your Hands)" (Big John Patton) – 2:29

== Personnel ==
- Doris Coley – lead and backing vocals
- Addie "Micki" Harris – lead and backing vocals
- Beverly Lee – lead and backing vocals
- Shirley Owens – lead and backing vocals
