= Foolish Little Girl (song) =

Single by The Shirelles

from the album Foolish Little Girl
- B-side: "Not For All the Money in the World"
- Released: March 1963
- Genre: R&B
- Length: 2:19
- Label: Scepter 1248
- Songwriters: Helen Miller, Howard Greenfield
- Producers: Luther Dixon, Stan Greenberg

The Shirelles singles chronology
"Everybody Loves a Lover" (1962)	"Foolish Little Girl" (1963)	"Don't Say Goodnight and Mean Goodbye" (1963)

"Foolish Little Girl" is a song written by Helen Miller and Howard Greenfield and performed by The Shirelles. It reached No. 4 on the Billboard Hot 100, No. 9 on the R&B chart, and No. 38 on the UK Singles Chart in 1963. The song appeared on their 1963 album, Foolish Little Girl and was ranked No. 57 on Billboard magazine's Top Hot 100 songs of 1963.

== Background ==
Cash Box described it as "a most attractive, easy beat cha cha romancer." The song released as a single was a demo recorded at Associated Studios in NYC on 7th Avenue.

== Personnel ==
=== The Shirelles' version ===
- Lead vocals by Shirley Owens and Beverly Lee
- Spoken intro by Doris Coley
- Backing vocals by Addie "Micki" Harris, Doris Coley, and Beverly Lee
- Charles Macey: Guitar, upright bass
- Buddy Saltzman: Drums
- Leroy Glover: Organ

=== Chart performance ===
Chart (1963)	Peak position
Canada (CHUM Chart)	8
UK Singles (The Official Charts Company)	38
US Billboard Hot 100	4
US Billboard Hot R&B Singles	9

== Other versions ==
- French-Vietnamese singer Tiny Yong released a French language cover of the song, Tais-toi petite folle, in 1963.
- Jin sampled the song on his song "Foolish Little Girls" from his 2005 album, The Emcee's Properganda.
- Dionne Bromfield included it on her 2009 album, Introducing Dionne Bromfield.

== In media ==
- The song was used in Act II in the 2009 jukebox musical, Baby It's You!.
