= Foolish Little Girl =

Studio album by The Shirelles
- Released: 1963
- Recorded: 1962–1963
- Genre: R&B, Pop, Soul
- Length: 24:19
- Label: Scepter Records; LP-511
- Producer: Luther Dixon; Stan Green

The Shirelles chronology
Baby It's You (1962)	Foolish Little Girl (1963)	It's a Mad, Mad, Mad, Mad World (1963)

Professional ratings
Review scores
Source	Rating
Allmusic	3/5 stars

Foolish Little Girl is a 1963 album by The Shirelles. The title track turned out to be the last of the group's big hits, stopping at number four on the U.S. pop charts. The album's other single, "Don't Say Goodnight and Mean Goodbye," (#26 US) was The Shirelles' last top forty US hit. Cash Box described it as "a tender, soft beat cha cha weeper...that the gals again polish off with finesse." Despite their weakening chart impact, the demand for Shirelles recordings continued to grow. The same year, they had provided material for the film It's A Mad Mad Mad Mad World. By this period, the main producer of The Shirelles, Luther Dixon, had gone to Capitol Records and production was taken over by Stan Green; some of Dixon's previously recorded tracks with the group appear on this album. Foolish Little Girl also contains material by Ellie Greenwich and Van McCoy.

Dionne Bromfield covered the title song on her debut album Introducing Dionne Bromfield in 2009 along with another Shirelles hit "Mama Said".

== Track listing ==
=== Side 1 ===
1. "Foolish Little Girl" (Howard Greenfield, Helen Miller)
2. "Hard Times" (Jackie Ross)
3. "Abra Ka Dabra" (Van McCoy)
4. "What's the Matter Baby" (Luther Dixon, Van McCoy)
5. "I Didn't Mean to Hurt You" (Ellie Greenwich, Tony Powers)
6. "Ooh Poo Pah Doo" (Jessie Hill)

=== Side 2 ===
1. "Don't Say Goodnight and Mean Goodbye" (Joseph DeAngelis, Charles Partee)
2. "Not for All the Money in the World" (R. Miller, Porter)
3. "Only Time Will Tell" (James W. Alexander, Sam Cooke)
4. "I Don't Think So" (Van McCoy)
5. "Talk Is Cheap" (Bob Crewe, Bob Gaudio)
6. "The Twitch" (Goodman, Simon)

== Singles history ==
- "Foolish Little Girl"/"Not for All the Money in the World" (#4 US),(#9 R&B),(#38 UK)
- "Don't Say Goodnight and Mean Goodbye"/"I Didn't Mean to Hurt You" (#26 US)

== Personnel ==
- Shirley Owens, Doris Coley, & Beverly Lee – lead and backing vocals
- Addie "Micki" Harris – backing vocals
- Luther Dixon & Stan Green – producers
