= Tonight's the Night (The Shirelles song) =

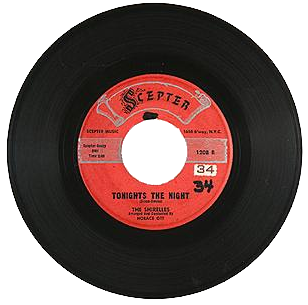

Single by The Shirelles

from the album Tonight's the Night
- B-side: "The Dance Is Over"
- Released: April 1960
- Recorded: 1960
- Studio: Bell Sound (New York City)
- Genre: R&B, Pop
- Length: 2:00
- Label: Scepter
- Songwriters: Luther Dixon; Shirley Owens
- Producer: Luther Dixon

The Shirelles singles chronology
"Dedicated to the One I Love" (1959)	"Tonight's the Night" (1960)	"Will You Love Me Tomorrow" (1960)

Audio sample
- The introduction to The Shirelle's version, with the strings and Owens' vocals clearly heard: file; help

"Tonight's the Night" is a song by the American girl group the Shirelles, from their 1961 album Tonight's the Night. Written by Luther Dixon and Shirley Owens, the song dealt with a woman's feelings before losing her virginity and was released as the pre-album's second single in 1960. In 2010, Rolling Stone listed it as one of the 500 greatest songs of all time.

== Production ==
"Tonight's the Night" was cowritten by the Shirelles' lead singer Shirley Owens, as well as Luther Dixon. It was the first production for the band by Dixon, who was booked by Florence Greenberg after having worked with Perry Como, Nat King Cole, and Pat Boone. It also marks the debut of composer Horace Ott.

== Critical reception ==
Richie Unterberger of AllMusic wrote of the album "these tracks are excellent".

== Theme and Style ==
"Tonight's the Night" deals with "Romantic Surrender" and "Soulful yearning"; it tells of a woman who is both expectant and hesitant regarding her first sexual experience, the degree of enthusiasm has been described as similar to that shown in Buddy Holly's "Oh, Boy!". Owens' vocals are described as full of "desire and vulnerability", as well as with a sense of "innocence and striving"; the effect is from her singing almost out of tune.

The strings in the song are similar to "There Goes My Baby", although Dixon notes that it was influenced by Brazilian Baião. Rolling Stone also notes the Latin style, with numerous instances of syncopation.

== Release ==
The single was released in April 1960, as the B-side to "The Dance Is Over". "The Dance is Over" did not make the Billboard Hot 100 chart. In September 1960, "Tonight's the Night" first appeared on the chart, eventually peaking at number 39. By 1961 it had reached gold status (500,000 copies sold). According to Greil Marcus, the song was shocking when it was released for its frank depiction of "a woman ... aware of her mind and body".

Soon after its release, it had to compete with a cover by the Chiffons (not the New York later group on Laurie Records with several hits, this was a Los Angeles Chiffons group), which used a similar arrangement and style. The Chiffons' cover eventually peaked at 76, becoming their first hit.

== Chart history ==
Chart (1960)	Peak position
US Billboard Hot 100	39
US Hot R&B/Hip-Hop Songs	14

== Legacy ==
Rolling Stone selected "Tonight's the Night" as the 409th best song of all time in their 2010 update to The 500 Greatest Songs of All Time list. It was the lower-ranked of two Shirelles songs; "Will You Love Me Tomorrow" was ranked 126th.

The song "The Dance is Over" was sampled by indie pop band TV Girl on their song "Lovers Rock", from French Exit.

== Personnel ==
- Lead vocals: Shirley Owens
- Backing vocals: Doris Coley, Beverly Lee, Addie "Micki" Harris
