= Tonight's the Night (The Shirelles album) =

Studio album by The Shirelles
- Released: December 1960
- Recorded: 1959–60
- Genre: R&B, pop, soul
- Length: 27:23
- Label: Scepter Records; S-501

The Shirelles chronology
| Tonight's the Night (1960) | The Shirelles Sing to Trumpets and Strings (1961) |

Tonight's the Night is the debut album by American girl group the Shirelles, released in December 1960 by Scepter Records. It contains the hit song "Will You Love Me Tomorrow" as well as "Tonight's the Night", which became a minor hit for the Shirelles. The album was remastered and restored by Cornbread Records. It was then reissued in 2017 on 180 Gram Vinyl with 2 bonus tracks, one track was " Look A Here Baby" on the end of side A and the second track was "A Teardrop And A Lollipop" on the end of side B.

In 2022, the album was selected by the Library of Congress for preservation in the National Recording Registry.

== Background ==
Although Shirley Owens was the group's main lead singer, Tonight's the Night also features lead vocals by Doris Coley and Beverly Lee; all four members share lead for "Doin' the Ronde". Later on in 1963, "Unlucky" was covered by Dionne Warwick for her debut album. "Boys", which had been the B-side of "Will You Love Me Tomorrow" and a regional hit on its original release, became better known after it was covered by the Beatles on their debut album Please Please Me in 1963.

== Reception ==
Professional ratings
Review scores
| Source | Rating |
|---|---|
| AllMusic | 3.5/5 stars |

In his retrospective review of the release, Richie Unterberger for AllMusic wrote "For the most part, even more so than some other Shirelles' long-players, the LP evokes a bygone era when innocuous young love and its accompanying hurts were the centers of many teenagers' universes, fretted over with the detailed seriousness of international diplomacy." The New Rolling Stone Album Guide rates this album three out of five stars, noting that this period of early Scepter albums was the band's most commercially and critically successful, due to the high-quality but risk-averse production from Luther Dixon.

== Track listing ==
Side one
| No. | Title | Writer(s) | Length |
|---|---|---|---|
| 1. | "Tonight's the Night" | Luther Dixon, Shirley Owens |
| 2. | "Johnny on My Mind" | Edward Lyons |
| 3. | "Lower the Flame" | Barney Williams, Eddie Snyder, Stanley Kahan |
| 4. | "Will You Love Me Tomorrow" | Carole King, Gerry Goffin |
| 5. | "Doin' the Ronde" | Addie Harris, Beverly Lee, Doris Coley, Shirley Owens |
| 6. | "You Don't Want My Love" | Luther Dixon |

Side two
| No. | Title | Writer(s) | Length |
|---|---|---|---|
| 7. | "Dedicated to the One I Love" | Lowman Pauling, Ralph Bass |
| 8. | "Boys" | Luther Dixon, Wes Farrell |
| 9. | "The Dance Is Over" | Luther Dixon |
| 10. | "Oh, What a Waste of Love" | Allyson R. Khent, Luther Dixon |
| 11. | "Unlucky" | Bobby Banks, Lillian Shockley |
| 12. | "Tonight at the Prom" | Barney Williams, Eddie Snyder, Stanley Kahan |

== Singles ==
- "Dedicated to the One I Love"/"Look a Here Baby" (#83 [1959] US, #3 [1961] US)
- "Tonight's the Night"/"The Dance Is Over" (#39 US, #14 US R&B)
- "Will You Love Me Tomorrow"/"Boys" (#1 US, #2 US R&B, #4 UK)

== Personnel ==
- Doris Coley – lead and backing vocals
- Addie "Micki" Harris – lead and backing vocals
- Beverly Lee – lead and backing vocals
- Shirley Owens – lead and backing vocals
