= Happy and In Love =

Studio album by The Shirelles
- Released: 1971
- Recorded: 1969–1971, New York City
- Label: RCA Victor LSP-4581
- Producer: Randy Irwin

The Shirelles chronology
Spontaneous Combustion (1967)	Happy and In Love (1971)	Shirelles (1972)

Singles from Happy and In Love
- 1. "Go Away and Find Yourself" Released: 1969; 2. "It's Gonna Take a Miracle" Released: 1970; 3. "Dedicated to the One I Love" Released: December 1970; 4. "No Sugar Tonight" Released: October 1971

Happy and In Love is the eleventh studio album by the Shirelles, released in 1971 on RCA Victor.

== Singles ==
"Go Away and Find Yourself" was originally released in 1969 when the group was with Bell Records. "It's Gonna Take a Miracle" and "Dedicated to the One I Love" was released in 1970 under contract with United Artists Records. "No Sugar Tonight" was released in October 1971.

== Reception ==
Professional ratings
Review scores
Source	Rating
AllMusic	3/5 stars
The Encyclopedia of Popular Music	2/5 stars

AllMusic editor Mark Deming stated "Happy and in Love revealed Alston (who takes the lead vocals on these albums), Harris, and Lee were all in fine voice, but seemingly caught between the youthful themes and approach of their best-known tunes and the richer, more mature sound of these women."

On September 25, 1971, Billboard wrote that:

Surprise, plus a little Magic of believing, returns us to the Sweet Shirelles, who have found the producer who can deliver them into a second-childhood of hits, hits, hits in Randy Irwin. Shirley, Micki, and Beverly dip into "No Sugar Tonight", "Go Away and Find Yourself", "Gonna Take a Miracle", and "Dedicated to the One I Love".

== Track listing ==
No.	Title	Length
1.	"No Sugar Tonight"	2:10
2.	"Boy You're Too Young"	2:18
3.	"Go Away And Find Yourself"	3:08
4.	"There's Nothing In This World"	2:34
5.	"Gotta Hold On This Feeling / I've Never Found A Boy"

No.	Title	Length
1.	"Take Me"	2:15
2.	"Dedicated To The One I Love"	2:12
3.	"It's Gonna Take A Miracle"	3:23
4.	"We Got A Lot Of Lovin' To Do"	2:30
5.	"Strange, I Still Love You"	2:13

== Credits ==
Adapted from liner notes.

- A&R Supervision – Buzz Willis
- Arranged By, Conductor – George Andrews, Joe Scott
- Engineer, Recorded By – Bruce Staple
- Producer – Randy Irwin
