= Shirley Owens =

American singer (born 1941)

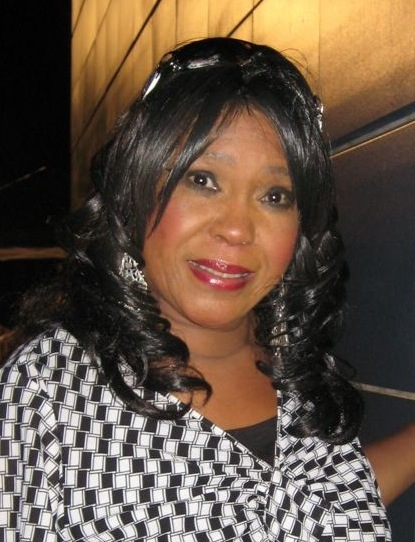
- Owens in 2008

Background information
- Born: June 10, 1941 (age 85); Henderson, North Carolina, U.S.
- Origin: Passaic, New Jersey, U.S.
- Genres: R&B, pop, soul
- Occupation: Singer
- Years active: 1958–present
- Formerly of: The Shirelles

Shirley Alston Reeves (born June 10, 1941), born Shirley Owens, is an American soul singer who was the main lead singer of the hit girl group the Shirelles.

== The Shirelles ==
In addition to Owens, The Shirelles consisted of fellow Passaic High School (New Jersey) alumni Doris Kenner Jackson, Addie "Micki" Harris McPhadden and Beverly Lee. Owens' strong, distinctive voice meant that she was a natural choice for the lead singer, though Jackson was also featured as lead on several songs, as well.

Reeves enjoyed a string of hits with The Shirelles throughout the 1960s, the most notable being "Will You Love Me Tomorrow". She left The Shirelles in 1975 to begin a solo career, initially recording under the name "Lady Rose".

The Shirelles were inducted into the Rock and Roll Hall of Fame in 1996. She also performed on the Doo Wop 51 PBS special in 2000.

== Solo ==
In 1975, she recorded an album entitled With A Little Help From My Friends, after the hit song by the Beatles, which featured members of the Flamingos, the Drifters, Shep and the Limelites, the Five Satins, the Belmonts, Danny & the Juniors, Herman's Hermits and La La Brooks of the Crystals.

Shirley continues to tour under the name 'Shirley Alston Reeves and her Shirelles'.

== Personal life ==
Through marriages, she became Shirley Alston and later, Shirley Alston Reeves. Her nephew, Gerald Alston is the lead singer of The Manhattans.

== Discography ==
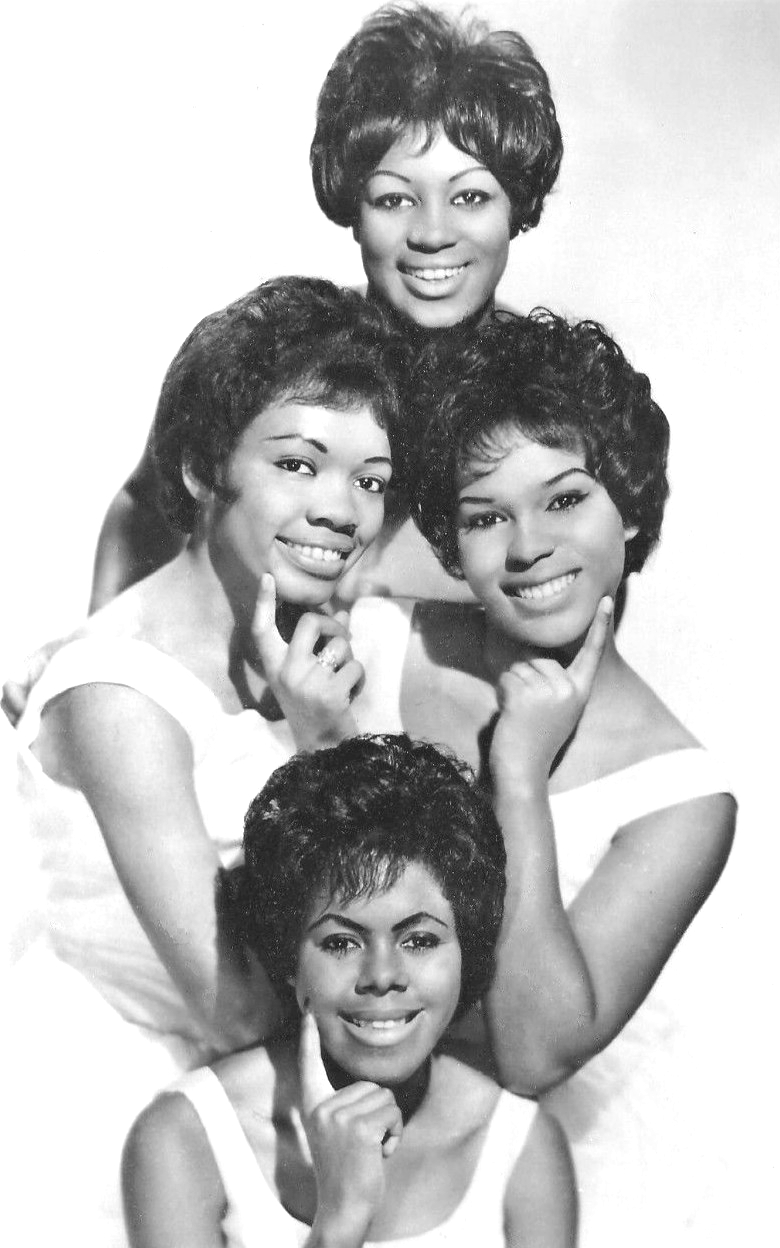
The Shirelles in 1962

=== Albums ===
Year	Album	Billboard 200	Record label
1960	Tonight's the Night	—	Scepter Records
1960	The Shirelles Sing to Trumpets and Strings	—	Scepter Records
1962	The Shirelles and King Curtis Give a Twist Party	—	Scepter Records
1962	Baby It's You	—	Scepter Records
1963	Foolish Little Girl	133	Scepter Records
1963	It's a Mad, Mad, Mad, Mad World	—	Scepter Records
1965	Hear and Now	—	Pricewise Records
1965	Swing the Most	—	Pricewise Records
1967	Spontaneous Combustion	—	Scepter Records
1971	Happy and in Love	—	RCA Records
1972	The Shirelles	—	RCA Records
1973	Eternally, Soul	—	Scepter Records
"—" denotes releases that did not chart.

=== Compilation albums ===
Year	Album	Billboard 200	Record label
1963	The Shirelles' Greatest Hits	67	Scepter Records
1964	The Shirelles Sing the Golden Oldies	—	Scepter Records
1967	The Shirelles's Greatest Hits Vol. II	—	Scepter Records
1972	Remember When Volume 1	—	Wand Records
1972	Remember When Volume 2	—	Wand Records
1973	The Shirelles Sing Their Very Best	—	Springboard
1975	The Very Best of the Shirelles	—	United Artists Records
1984	Anthology 1959–1964	—	Rhino Records
"—" denotes releases that did not chart.

=== Singles ===
Year	Single (A-side, B-side) Both sides from same album except where indicated	Chart positions			Album
Year	Single (A-side, B-side) Both sides from same album except where indicated	US	US R&B	UK	Album
1958	"I Met Him on a Sunday (Ronde-Ronde)" b/w "I Want You to Be My Boyfriend"	49	—	—	Non-album tracks
1958	"My Love Is a Charm" b/w "Slop Time"	—	—	—	Non-album tracks
1958	"I Got the Message" b/w "Stop Me"	—	—	—	Non-album tracks
1959	"Dedicated to the One I Love" b/w "Look a Here Baby" (Non-album track)	83	—	—	Tonight's the Night
1959	"Doin' the Ronde" b/w "A Teardrop and A Lollipop" (Non-album track)	—	—	—	Tonight's the Night
1960	"Please Be My Boyfriend" b/w "I Saw a Tear" (from The Shirelles Sing to Trumpets and Strings)	—	—	—	The Shirelles' Greatest Hits Vol. II
1960	"Tonight's the Night" b/w "The Dance Is Over"	39	14	—	Tonight's the Night
1960	"Will You Love Me Tomorrow" b/w "Boys"	1	2	4	Tonight's the Night
1961	"Dedicated to the One I Love" (reissue) b/w "Look a Here Baby" (Non-album track)	3	2	—	Tonight's the Night
1961	"Mama Said" b/w "Blue Holiday"	4	2	—	The Shirelles Sing to Trumpets and Strings
1961	"A Thing of the Past" b/w "What a Sweet Thing That Was" (from The Shirelles Sing to Trumpets and Strings)	41 54	26 —	— —	Baby It's You
1961	"Big John (Ain't You Gonna Marry Me)" b/w "Twenty-One"	21	2	—	Baby It's You
1961	"Baby It's You" b/w "Things I Want to Hear (Pretty Words)"	8 107	3 —	— —	Baby It's You
1962	"Soldier Boy" b/w "Love Is a Swingin' Thing" (from Give a Twist Party)	1 109	3 —	23 —	Baby It's You
1962	"Welcome Home, Baby" b/w "Mama, Here Comes the Bride"	22 104	20 —	— —	Give a Twist Party (With King Curtis)
1962	"Stop the Music" b/w "It's Love That Really Counts (In the Long Run)"	36 102	— —	— —	The Shirelles' Greatest Hits
1962	"Everybody Loves a Lover" b/w "I Don't Think So" (from Foolish Little Girl)	19	15	—	The Shirelles' Greatest Hits
1963	"Foolish Little Girl" b/w "Not for All the Money in the World"	4 100	9 —	38 —	Foolish Little Girl
1963	"Don't Say Goodnight and Mean Goodbye" b/w "I Didn't Mean to Hurt You"	26	—	—	Foolish Little Girl
1963	"What Does a Girl Do?" b/w "Don't Let It Happen to Us" (Non-album track)	53	*	—	The Shirelles Swing the Most
1963	"It's a Mad, Mad, Mad, Mad World" b/w "31 Flavors"	92 97	*	— —	It's a Mad, Mad, Mad, Mad World
1964	"Tonight You're Gonna Fall in Love with Me" b/w "20th Century Rock N' Roll" (from It's a Mad, Mad, Mad, Mad World)	57	*	—	Hear & Now
1964	"Sha-La-La" b/w "His Lips Get in the Way" (from The Shirelles Swing the Most)	69	*	—	Hear & Now
1964	"Thank You Baby" b/w "Dooms Day" (from Hear & Now)	63	*	—	The Shirelles' Greatest Hits Vol. II
1964	"Maybe Tonight" b/w "Lost Love"	88 125	*	— —	Hear & Now
1964	"Are You Still My Baby" b/w "I Saw a Tear" (from The Shirelles Sing to Trumpets and Strings)	91	*	—	Non-album tracks
1965	"Shhh, I'm Watching the Movie" b/w "A Plus B"	—	—	—	Non-album tracks
1965	"March (You'll Be Sorry)" b/w "Everybody's Goin' Mad" (from It's a Mad, Mad, Mad, Mad World)	108	—	—	Non-album tracks
1965	"My Heart Belongs to You" b/w "Love That Man" (Non-album track)	125	—	—	The Shirelles' Greatest Hits Vol. II
1965	"Mama, My Soldier Boy Is Coming Home" b/w "Soldier Boy" (from Baby, It's You)	—	—	—	Non-album track
1966	"I Met Him on a Sunday – '66" b/w "Love That Man" (Non-album track)	—	—	—	The Shirelles' Greatest Hits Vol. II
1966	"Que Sera Sera" b/w "Till My Baby Comes Home"	—	—	—	Remember When
1966	"Shades of Blue" b/w "When the Boys Talk About the Girls" (from Remember When)	122	—	—	Non-album tracks
1966	"Teasin' Me" b/w "Look Away"	—	—	—	Non-album tracks
1967	"Don't Go Home (My Little Darlin')" b/w "Nobody Baby After You" (Non-album track)	110	—	—	The Shirelles' Greatest Hits Vol. II
1967	"Bright Shiny Colors" b/w "Too Much of a Good Thing"	—	—	—	Non-album tracks
1967	"Last Minute Miracle" b/w "No Doubt About It"	99	41	—	Spontaneous Combustion
1968	"Sweet Sweet Lovin'" b/w "Don't Mess with Cupid"	—	—	—	Non-album tracks
1968	"Call Me (If You Want Me)" b/w "There's a Storm Going On in My Heart"	—	—	—	Non-album tracks
1969	"A Most Unusual Boy" b/w "Look What You've Done to My Heart"	—	—	—	Non-album tracks
1969	"Playthings" b/w "Looking Glass"	—	—	—	Non-album tracks
1969	"Go Away and Find Yourself" b/w "Never Give You Up (Never Gonna Give You Up)"	—	—	—	Non-album tracks
1970	"There Goes My Baby/Be My Baby" b/w "Strange, I Love You"	—	—	—	Non-album tracks
1970	"It's Gonna Take a Miracle" b/w "Lost"	—	—	—	Non-album tracks
1970	"Dedicated to the One I Love" (new version) b/w "Take Me"	—	—	—	Non-album tracks
1971	"No Sugar Tonight" b/w "Strange, I Love You"	—	—	—	Happy and In Love
1972	"Sunday Dreaming" b/w "Brother, Brother"	—	—	—	The Shirelles
1973	"Let's Give Each Other Love" b/w "Deep in the Night" (from The Shirelles)	—	—	—	Non-album tracks
1973	"Do What You've a Mind To" b/w "Touch the Wind"	—	—	—	Non-album tracks
"—" denotes releases that did not chart or were not released in that territory.
