= Loving Up a Storm =

"Loving Up a Storm" is the title of the following works:

== Songs ==
- "Lovin' Up a Storm" (Jerry Lee Lewis song), 1959
- "Loving Up a Storm" (Razzy Bailey song), 1980
