= Boys (The Shirelles song) =

1960 song by The Shirelles, later recorded by the Beatles

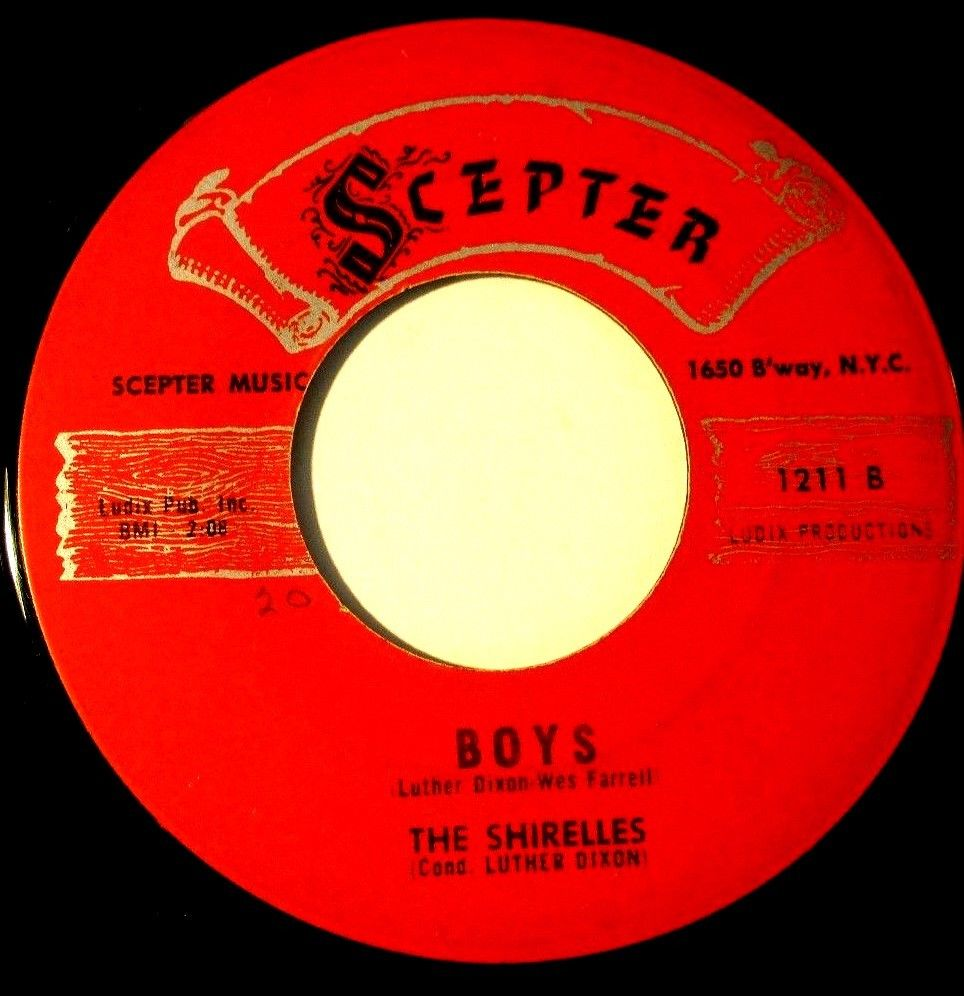

Single by the Shirelles

from the album Tonight's the Night
- A-side: "Will You Love Me Tomorrow"
- Released: November 1960 (US); 1961 (UK)
- Recorded: 1960
- Studio: Bell Sound (New York City)
- Genre: R&B
- Length: 2:08
- Label: Scepter
- Songwriters: Luther Dixon; Wes Farrell
- Producer: Luther Dixon

"Boys" is a song written by Luther Dixon and Wes Farrell, originally recorded by the Shirelles at Bell Sound Studios in New York City and released as the B-side of their "Will You Love Me Tomorrow" single in November 1960. It was recorded more than two years later by the Beatles and included on their debut album in the United Kingdom, Please Please Me (1963).

== The Shirelles' version ==
In 1960, the American girl group the Shirelles released "Boys" as the B-side of "Will You Love Me Tomorrow" (Scepter single 1211), published by Ludix Pub. Inc. (BMI).

== The Beatles' version ==
"Boys"
- Cover of the song's sheet music

Song by the Beatles

from the album Please Please Me
- Released: March 22, 1963
- Recorded: February 11, 1963
- Genre: Rock and roll
- Length: 2:24
- Label: Parlophone
- Songwriters: Luther Dixon; Wes Farrell
- Producer: George Martin

Music video
- "Boys" on YouTube

The Beatles' version was recorded at EMI Recording Studios on February 11, 1963, in a single take. It is Ringo Starr's first recorded lead vocal with the Beatles and, as the fifth track on the Beatles' first album, Please Please Me, represents the first time many fans heard Starr singing a lead vocal. This version bears many similarities to Ray Charles's hit "What'd I Say", particularly during the chorus verses. February 11 was a marathon day for the Beatles, because they recorded 10 of the 14 tracks they needed for Please Please Me. The band also included another song by the Shirelles, "Baby It's You", on the album.

The Beatles did not concern themselves about possible homosexual undertones that go with singing a song about boys, although they altered the gender pronouns employed on the Shirelles' version (e.g. "My girl says when I kiss her lips..."). In an October 2005 Rolling Stone interview, Paul McCartney stated: "Any one of us could hold the audience. Ringo would do 'Boys', which was a fan favourite with the crowd. And it was great — though if you think about it, here's us doing a song and it was really a girls' song. 'I talk about boys now!' Or it was a gay song. But we never even listened. It's just a great song. I think that's one of the things about youth — you just don't give a shit. I love the innocence of those days."

McCartney also said: "Ringo always used to do a song in the show. Back then he had 'Boys'. It was a little embarrassing because it went, 'I'm talking about boys - yeah, yeah - boys'. It was a Shirelles hit and they were girls singing it, but we never thought we should call it Girls, just because Ringo was a boy. We just sang it the way they'd sung it and never considered any implications." (Paul McCartney. From Anthology.)

"Boys" had always been the Beatles' "drummer" song during their Cavern days – Pete Best sang it at that time – and it was their main "drummer" song until 1964. Coincidentally, Starr also sang the song for his solo spot with Rory Storm and the Hurricanes, and Cilla Black would sometimes join him on stage, sharing the microphone. Best released his own version of the song in 1965.

A live version of the song was included on the Beatles live album The Beatles at the Hollywood Bowl, first released in 1977, and re-released in 2016 as Live at the Hollywood Bowl. Recorded on 23 August 1964, 'Boys' was the first track to be released on digital download and streaming platforms, one week prior to the full remastered album release on 9 September 2016.

The Beatles' version of the song is playable on The Beatles: Rock Band video game.

On February 9, 2014, Ringo performed "Boys" as part of the finale on the CBS 50th-anniversary special of the Beatles' first Ed Sullivan Show appearance on February 9, 1964, and later performed it again, with the help of Green Day, for his Rock and Roll Hall of Fame induction.

On July 7, 2020, Joe Walsh performed the song as part of a virtual concert celebrating Ringo Starr's 80th birthday.

=== Personnel ===
- Ringo Starr – vocals, drums
- John Lennon – rhythm guitar, backing vocals
- Paul McCartney – bass, backing vocals
- George Harrison – lead guitar, backing vocals

Engineered by Norman Smith

Personnel per Ian MacDonald
