= Everybody Loves a Lover =

1958 single by Doris Day

Single by Doris Day
- B-side: "Instant Love"
- Released: 1958
- Genre: Pop
- Length: 2:41
- Label: Columbia 41195
- Composer: Robert Allen
- Lyricist: Richard Adler

Doris Day singles chronology
"A Very Precious Love" (1958)	"Everybody Loves a Lover" (1958)	"Tunnel of Love" (1958)

"Everybody Loves a Lover" is a popular song which was a hit single for Doris Day in 1958. Its lyricist Richard Adler and its composer Robert Allen were both best known for collaborations with other partners. The music Allen composed, aside from this song, was usually in collaboration with Al Stillman, and Adler wrote the lyrics after the 1955 death of his usual composing partner Jerry Ross.

== Background and Doris Day recording ==
The song's genesis was a comment made to Adler by his lawyer: "You know what Shakespeare said, 'All the world loves a lover.'" (In fact, this was a misattribution of a quote by Ralph Waldo Emerson.) Adler and Allen quickly wrote "Everybody Loves a Lover" in New York City. Doris Day and Adler knew each other from the film version of The Pajama Game, whose songs Adler and Ross had written (originally for the stage musical version of The Pajama Game). Day had mentioned to Adler that she was looking for a new novelty song to record, and on a visit to Los Angeles Allen presented "Everybody Loves a Lover" for consideration by Day, her husband-manager Marty Melcher, and Mitch Miller, head of Columbia Records, Day's record label. Although Day, Melcher, and Miller all saw the song's potential as a hit, Melcher made Day's recording of "Everybody Loves a Lover" conditional on the song's copyright being granted to Artists Music, the publishing firm he owned with Day – a condition to which Allen was not agreeable. However, after a few days, Melcher phoned Allen to say that Day would record the song without her and Melcher acquiring its publishing rights.

Day recorded "Everybody Loves a Lover" in May 1958 with Frank DeVol producing and Earl Palmer on drums. Issued as Columbia catalog number 41195, "Everybody Loves a Lover" first appeared on the Billboard charts on July 21, 1958. On the Disk Jockey chart it peaked at number 6, number 17 on the Best Seller chart; and number 14 on the Hot 100 composite chart. The Doris Day version is noteworthy for the third verse, in which, through overdubbing, the first four lines of verse 2 are sung over the first four lines of verse 1, creating a counterpoint duet. The two segments end on the same word, "Pollyanna", sung in harmony. The song was Day's last big charting hit in the U.S., although she would hit number 4 in 1964 in the UK with the title song of her then-current movie Move Over, Darling. The Doris Day version of "Everybody Loves a Lover" was used in the soundtrack for the BBC's period drama Call the Midwife.

== The Shirelles version and rock and roll remakes ==
"Everybody Loves a Lover"

Single by The Shirelles
- B-side: "I Don't Think So"
- Released: 1962
- Genre: R&B
- Length: 2:38
- Label: Scepter 1243
- Composer: Robert Allen
- Lyricist: Richard Adler

The Shirelles singles chronology
"It's Love That Really Counts (In the Long Run)" (1962)	"Everybody Loves a Lover" (1962)	"Foolish Little Girl" (1963)

"Everybody Loves a Lover" was remade by the Shirelles in 1962, reaching #19 in January 1963. This version, the group's final collaboration with producer Luther Dixon, replicates the backbeat and instrumentation of the Barbara George hit "I Know (You Don't Love Me No More)".

Cash Box described it as "a contagious New Orleans-styled shuffle showcase," saying that "the gals (and the instrumentalists) polish it off in sparkling style."

Besides concurrent covers for the UK market by both the Undertakers and Cliff Bennett, the Shirelles' version of "Everybody Loves a Lover" was also the template for the Sandie Shaw version recorded for her 1965 Sandie album as well as the Peaches and Herb version recorded for their 1967 album For Your Love. Additionally a live performance by Beryl Marsden of "Everybody Loves a Lover" with the Shirelles' version's arrangement was recorded at the Cavern Club in June 1963 and released on the multi-artist album At The Cavern in 1964. Checkmates, Ltd. released a version of the song as part of a medley on their 1967 debut album, Live! At Caesar's Palace. Guy Mitchell also recorded the song in 1960.

== Remakes - pop music ==
In its original traditional pop format, "Everybody Loves a Lover" has also been covered by The Angels (whose 1962 version bubbled under the Hot 100 with a #103 peak), Alice Babs (as "Den som glad är" _{Swedish}), Chisu (as "Kellä Kulta, Sillä Onni" _{Finnish}), Sacha Distel (as "Dis! O Dis!" _{French}), Nana Gualdi (as "Junge Leute Brauchen Liebe" _{German}), Jan Howard, Laila Kinnunen (as "Kellä Kulta, Sillä Onni" _{Finnish}), Lill-Babs (as "Den som glad är" _{Swedish}), Angélica María (as "Vivaracho" _{Spanish}), Guy Mitchell, Jane Morgan, Line Renaud (as "Dis! O Dis!" _{French}), and Keely Smith. In 2010 Australian singer Melinda Schneider recorded the song for her Doris Day tribute album Melinda Does Doris. Instrumental versions have been recorded by Joe Loss and Shirley Scott.

On 19 November 2015 a remake of "Everybody Loves a Lover" by Scott Dreier and Jane Monheit was made available for download at the Doris Day Animal Foundation website in return for a $5 donation. All monies raised went entirely to the foundation with the song's publishers and artists having waived any royalties. Recorded at EastWest Studios, the track is a preview of Dreier's upcoming tribute CD The Doris Day Project.
