= Florence Greenberg =

American record label owner, music executive and record producer (1913–1995)

- Born: September 16, 1913
- Died: November 2, 1995 (aged 82); Hackensack University Medical Center, Hackensack, New Jersey, U.S.
- Occupations: Music executive; record producer
- Children: 2
- Musical career
- Years active: 1956–1976
- Labels: Tiara Records; Scepter Records; Hob Records; Wand Records

Florence Greenberg (September 16, 1913 – November 2, 1995) was an American record label owner, music executive, and record producer. She was the founder and owner of Tiara Records, Scepter Records, Hob Records, and Wand Records. She is best known for working as a record producer and music executive with several popular singers in the 1960s including Dionne Warwick, the Shirelles, Tammi Terrell, Chuck Jackson, and B.J. Thomas.

== Early life and career ==
Greenberg was a housewife in Passaic, New Jersey. In 1956, a 43-year-old Greenberg was desperately searching for an escape from her suburban lifestyle with not much to do. She often hung out at the Turf restaurant in New York City as she was enamored with the atmosphere surrounding the Brill Building. Her two children, Mary Jane and Stanley were in school. A friend of her husband, Freddy Bienstock, helped her to get in the record business by one day inviting her over to the Hill & Range Music offices while he was working with his cousins Jean and Julian Aberbach.

In 1958, Greenberg started her own record label, called Tiara Records. After a performance by a group of girls at Passaic High School in 1957, her daughter Mary Jane convinced her that she had to hear the group sing. She signed the group, The Shirelles, to Tiara after they auditioned for Greenberg in her living room. The first song recorded and released on the Tiara Records label was "I Met Him on a Sunday," The Shirelles' talent show song which grabbed the attention of Greenberg in the first place. Just as the record began to break locally, Greenberg sold the company with the Shirelles' contract to Decca Records for $4,000.

However, Greenberg started a new label in 1959, called Scepter Records, which became one of the leading independent record labels in the 1960s. Under Scepter Records, she re-signed The Shirelles, again becoming their manager. In 1961, she launched another record label, called Wand Records, as a subsidiary of Scepter. In 1963, the Shirelles learned that a trust holding their royalties which Greenberg and Scepter allegedly had promised to give them and they were supposed to receive on their 21st birthdays, did not exist. In response, they left the label later filing a breach of contract suit against the company. Scepter met the action with a countersuit for quitting; both suits were withdrawn in 1965 after an agreement was reached.

Greenberg, who was not a musician, once said of herself that she was "a white woman who was in a black business and who couldn't carry a tune." Addressing those shortcomings, she began a partnership with Luther Dixon. After bringing Dixon into Scepter, Greenberg focused primarily on the business operations of the label, while Dixon managed Scepter's publishing and artistic production. Around the same time, she moved her labels' offices to 1650 Broadway, a building which also housed Aldon Music (employing Carole King and Gerry Goffin among other songwriters). It was close to the Brill Building at 1619 Broadway.

In 1965, Greenberg received an offer of $6 million for Scepter from Gulf+Western; she rejected it later regretting not accepting the deal. She retired in 1976 and sold all of her labels to Springboard International.

== Personal life and death ==
Greenberg was married to an accountant with whom she had two children, Mary Jane (Greenberg) Goff and Stanley Greenberg. At the time of her death, she was a grandmother to six and had five great-grandchildren. Her son-in-law, Sam Goff, is a managing partner in Essex Entertainment. She was Jewish.

Greenberg died on November 2, 1995, of heart failure at Hackensack University Medical Center in Hackensack, New Jersey. She was 82 and was living in Teaneck, New Jersey.

== Legacy ==
In 2011, a Broadway show based on Greenberg's life called Baby It's You! debuted starring Beth Leavel as Greenberg. Prior to the show’s opening, a lawsuit was filed “seeking damages on behalf of performers Beverly Lee of The Shirelles, Dionne Warwick, and Chuck Jackson as well as the Estates of Doris Coley Jackson and Addie Harris Jackson, for the unauthorized use of their names and likenesses” against Warner Bros. Theatre Ventures. The lawsuit was settled by Warner Bros. in December 2011, three months after the show closed and the case did not go to trial.

== Notable works ==
Greenberg's labels produced these songs:

- "Dedicated to the One I Love" - The Shirelles
- "I Don't Want To Cry" - Chuck Jackson
- "Louie Louie" - The Kingsmen
- "Raindrops Keep Fallin' On My Head" - B. J. Thomas (featured in Butch Cassidy and the Sundance Kid and subsequently the winner of the Academy Award for Best Original Song)
- "Soldier Boy" - The Shirelles (a Florence Greenberg composition)
- "Tonight's the Night" - The Shirelles
- "Twist and Shout" - The Isley Brothers
- "Walk On By" - Dionne Warwick
- "Will You Love Me Tomorrow" - The Shirelles (the first girl group single to reach Number One on the charts)
