= Welcome Home, Baby =

Single by The Shirelles

from the album The Shirelles and King Curtis Give a Twist Party
- B-side: "Mama, Here Comes the Bride"
- Released: 1962
- Recorded: Bell Sound (New York City)
- Genre: R&B
- Length: 2:32
- Label: Scepter
- Songwriter(s): Luther Dixon
- Producer(s): Luther Dixon

The Shirelles singles chronology
"Soldier Boy" (1962)	"Welcome Home, Baby" (1962)	"It's Love That Really Counts (In the Long Run)" (1962)

"Welcome Home, Baby" is a song written by Luther Dixon and performed by The Shirelles. The song reached #20 on the R&B chart, #22 on the Billboard Hot 100, and #31 in Canada in 1962. It was featured on their 1962 album, The Shirelles and King Curtis Give a Twist Party.

The song was arranged by Bert Keyes.

The single's B-side, "Mama, Here Comes the Bride", reached #104 on the Billboard chart.
