= Will You Love Me Tomorrow =

1960 single by the Shirelles

- Side A variant of the original US single

Single by the Shirelles

from the album Tonight's the Night
- B-side: "Boys"
- Released: November 1960 (US); 1961 (UK)
- Recorded: 1960
- Studio: Bell Sound (New York City)
- Genre: Brill Building; doo-wop; pop; soul
- Length: 2:41
- Label: Scepter
- Composer: Carole King
- Lyricist: Gerry Goffin
- Producer: Luther Dixon

The Shirelles singles chronology
"Tonight's the Night" (1960)	"Will You Love Me Tomorrow" (1960)	"Mama Said" (1961)

"Will You Love Me Tomorrow" (sometimes titled "Will You Still Love Me Tomorrow") is a song written by Gerry Goffin and Carole King. It was first recorded in 1960 by the Shirelles for their album Tonight's the Night; released as a single that November, it became the first song by a girl group to top the Billboard Hot 100 chart. It has since been recorded by many other artists, including King on her 1971 album Tapestry.

== The Shirelles' version ==
=== Background ===
In 1960, the American girl group the Shirelles released the first version of the song as Scepter single 1211, with "Boys" on the B-side, and both songs featured on their debut album Tonight's the Night. The single's first pressing was labeled simply "Tomorrow", then lengthened later. When first presented with the song, lead singer Shirley Owens thought it was "too country", but relented after a string arrangement was added. Session musicians on the recording included Paul Griffin on piano and Gary Chester on drums. Owens recalled on Jim Parsons' syndicated radio program Shake Rattle Showtime that some radio stations had banned the record because they felt the lyrics were too sexually charged. The song is in AABA form.

=== Release and legacy ===
In addition to reaching No. 1 in the United States Billboard Hot 100, the song reached No. 2 on the Billboard R&B chart and No. 4 on the UK singles chart. It reached No. 3 in New Zealand.

The song was ranked at No. 126 on Rolling Stone's list of The 500 Greatest Songs of All Time. Billboard named the song No. 3 on its list of the "100 Greatest Girl Group Songs of All Time" in 2017.

In 1999, the song was inducted into the Grammy Hall of Fame.

=== Charts ===
==== Weekly charts ====
Chart (1960–1961)	Peak position
Canada (CHUM Hit Parade)	2
Chile (Discomania Madrid)	1
Italy (Musica e Dischi)	20
New Zealand (Lever Hit Parade)	3
UK Singles Chart	4
US Billboard Hot 100	1
US Billboard R&B Singles	2
US Cash Box Top 100	1

== Certifications ==
Region	Certification	Certified units/sales
United Kingdom (BPI)	Silver	200,000^{‡}
^{‡} Sales+streaming figures based on certification alone.

=== Year-end charts ===
Chart (1961)	Rank
US Billboard Hot 100	20
US Billboard R&B	14
US Cash Box Top 100	3

=== Answer songs ===
Bertell Dache recorded an answer song entitled "Not Just Tomorrow, But Always" in 1960, which was arranged by Carole King.

The Satintones, an early Motown group, also recorded an answer song called "Tomorrow and Always" (in two different versions), which used the same melody as the original but initially neglected to credit King and Gerry Goffin. Following a threat of litigation, later pressings of the record included proper credit. Eventually, it was withdrawn and replaced by the song "Angel" with the same B-side "A Love That Can Never Be". The Satintones' versions are included in the box set The Complete Motown Singles, Volume 1: 1959–1961.

== Carole King version ==
=== Background ===
In 1971, Carole King, who composed the music of the song, recorded a version of "Will You Love Me Tomorrow" for her second studio album Tapestry, with Joni Mitchell and James Taylor performing background vocals on separate audio channels. King's version of the song was taken at a considerably slower tempo. David Hepworth analyzed it as "less like the pleas for gentleness on the part of a trembling virgin and more like a mature woman requiring parity in a relationship." It gained considerable album-oriented rock airplay due to the large-scale commercial success of the album.

The song became a feature of King's live shows. Taylor recreated his part during their joint arena-based Troubadour Reunion Tour of 2010.

In the 2013 Broadway musical Beautiful: The Carole King Musical, the song is featured in part four times: once during its writing, once during King recording a demo of it, then with the Shirelles performing it, and then King singing and playing it later during an especially bad time in her marriage with Goffin. No other song is featured as frequently in the musical.

=== Personnel ===
- Carole King – piano, vocals
- Danny "Kootch" Kortchmar – acoustic guitar
- Russ Kunkel – drums
- Charles "Charlie" Larkey – bass guitar
- Joni Mitchell – background vocals
- James Taylor – acoustic guitar, backing vocals

== Notable cover versions ==
- Dusty Springfield recorded a cover for her debut album A Girl Called Dusty in 1964. The song was also included on Springfield's first U.S. release Stay Awhile / I Only Want To Be With You.
- New Zealand band Larry's Rebels included a garage rock cover version on their 1967 debut album A Study in Black.
- The Four Seasons included a cover on their compilation album Edizione D'Oro: The 4 Seasons Gold Edition – 29 Gold Hits and hit number 15 in Cash Box and number 24 on the Billboard Hot 100 with the song in 1968.
- Linda Ronstadt released a version on her 1970 album Silk Purse. It reached number 98 in Cash Box and peaked at number 111 on the Billboard Bubbling Under Hot 100 chart.
- Roberta Flack's version from her album Quiet Fire hit number 76 on the Billboard Hot 100 in 1972 as "Will You Still Love Me Tomorrow".
- Smokey Robinson recorded a version for his 1973 album Smokey. This cover was later sampled on the Kanye West song "Devil in a New Dress" from his 2010 album My Beautiful Dark Twisted Fantasy.
- Melanie included a version on her album Madrugada which reached number 82 on the Billboard Hot 100 in 1973 and reached the top 40 in the United Kingdom in 1974.
- Dana Valery recorded a dance version that hit number 95 on the Billboard Hot 100 in 1976.
- The Michael Stanley Band included a version for their 1977 live album Stage Pass, recorded at Cleveland's Agora Ballroom.
- Dave Mason recorded the song in 1978 for his album Mariposa de Oro, and had a number 39 hit on the Billboard Hot 100 with his remake. It was his final top 40 hit on that chart.
- Ram & Tam had a hit on the UK reggae chart, reaching no. 25 with their version in late 1979 and included it on their 1986 album Love & Life.
- Dionne Warwick recorded her version for her 1983 album How Many Times Can We Say Goodbye, which featured the original Shirelles on guest vocals.
- Laura Branigan covered the song for her 1984 Self Control album. It was a piano version, and in concerts and television appearances throughout her career, Branigan accompanied herself on the piano for the song.
- Bryan Ferry recorded his version of the song for his 1993 album Taxi. It was released as the album's second single, with the accompanying music video starring Ferry and Anna Nicole Smith.
- The Bee Gees covered the song in contribution to the 1995 tribute album: Tapestry Revisited: A Tribute to Carole King.
- Amy Winehouse sang a version for the 2004 film Bridget Jones: The Edge of Reason, which was included on the European edition of the soundtrack album. The song also appeared on Winehouse's posthumous album Lioness: Hidden Treasures in 2011.
- Kelly Clarkson was inspired by Winehouse's style to perform the song herself on The Kelly Clarkson Show.
- Leslie Grace released a bachata version in 2012 which became her debut single. Her version peaked at number one on the Billboard Tropical Songs chart and number one on the Latin Airplay chart, becoming the youngest female artist to do so. She also released a dance version for her 2013 self-titled album, Leslie Grace.
- Kamasi Washington covered the song on his 2018 LP The Choice.
- Taylor Swift performed the song in King's honor at the 2021 Rock and Roll Hall of Fame induction ceremony.
- Brian Fallon recorded a cover of the song for the movie Ready or Not 2: Here I Come featuring Madi Diaz.
- Farley (2026)

== See also ==
- List of Hot 100 number-one singles of 1961 (U.S.)
- List of Billboard number-one Latin songs of 2012
