= Beth Leavel =

American actress and singer (born 1955)

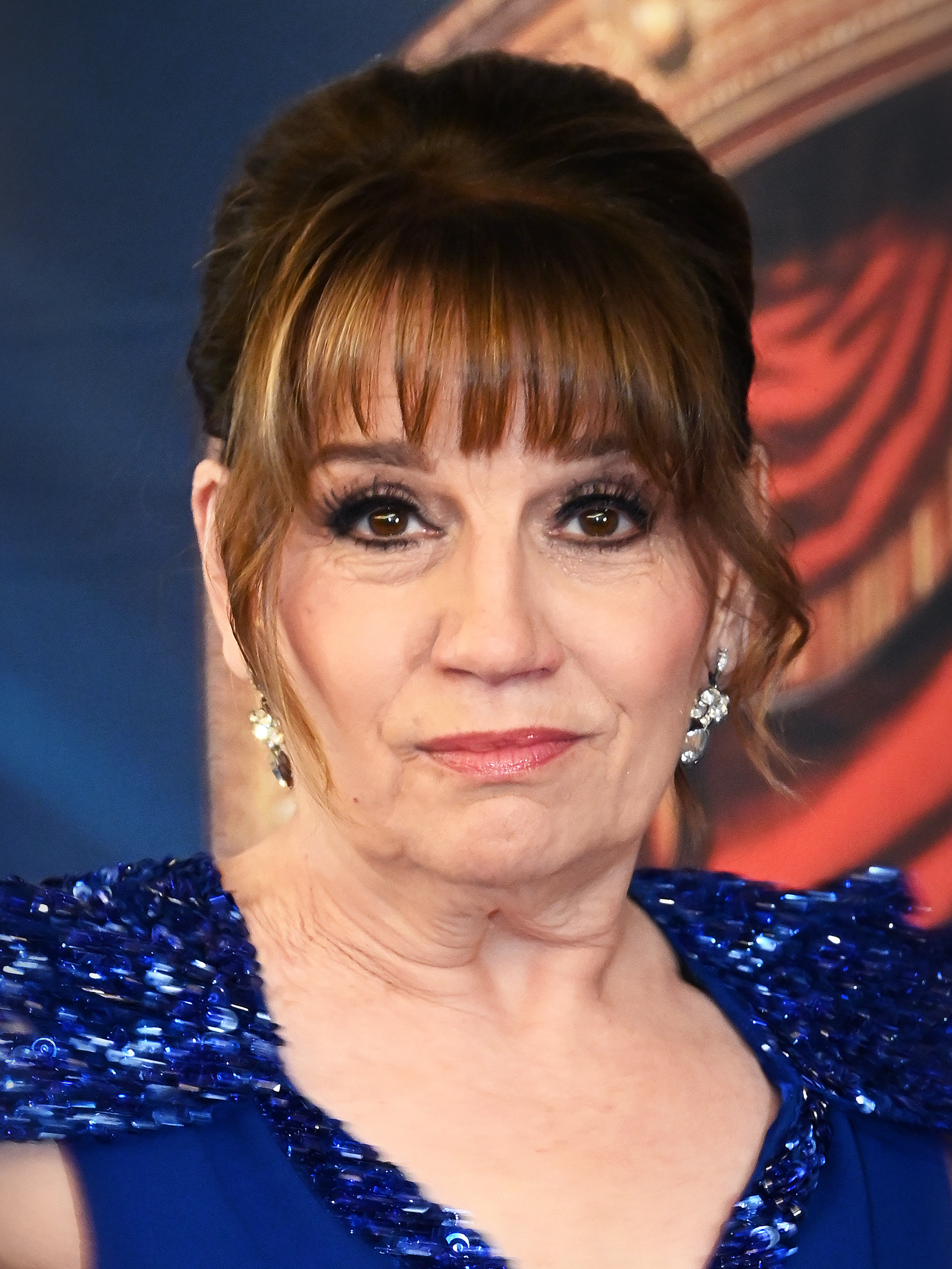
- Leavel in 2025
- Born: November 1, 1955 (age 70); Raleigh, North Carolina, U.S.
- Education: Meredith College (BA); University of North Carolina, Greensboro (MFA)
- Occupations: Actress, singer
- Years active: 1980–present
- Spouse: Adam Heller

Beth Leavel (born November 1, 1955) is an American stage and screen actress and singer. She is best known for her performances in Broadway musicals such as The Drowsy Chaperone, Baby It's You! and The Prom, receiving Tony Award nominations for all three and winning for The Drowsy Chaperone.

== Life and career ==
Leavel attended Needham B. Broughton High School and Meredith College, earning a degree in social work. She completed a graduate theatre degree at the University of North Carolina at Greensboro in 1980. She acted during college, appearing in productions such as Cabaret and Hello, Dolly!

Her Broadway debut was in the 1980 production of 42nd Street as a replacement for Annie Reilly. Leavel was in the original Broadway cast of Crazy for You (1992) as Tess Parker and an understudy for Polly Baker.

In 1999, she played the roles of Mabel and Mrs. Lydia Bixby in The Civil War. Leavel returned to the Broadway revival of 42nd Street in 2001 as a standby for Maggie Jones and Dorothy Brock, eventually playing the latter.

She played the starring role of Beatrice Stockwell in The Drowsy Chaperone, for which she helped to create the character's backstory and which she referred to as "a compilation of a lot of different women in theatre." For this role, she received a Tony Award for Best Featured Actress in a Musical at the 60th Tony Awards and a Drama Desk Award for Outstanding Featured Actress in a Musical.

Leavel succeeded Andrea Martin as Frau Blucher in the Broadway production of Young Frankenstein on July 15, 2008, and remained with the show until it closed on January 4, 2009. She starred in the world premiere of the burlesque-rich musical Minsky's in Los Angeles, which ran at the Center Theatre in the Ahmanson Theatre from January 21-March 1, 2009; the musical also starred her former Young Frankenstein co-stars Christopher Fitzgerald and Sarrah Strimel.

In 2009, Leavel starred in a stage reading of Dylan Glatthorn's Republic with Lauren Worsham and Kelli Barrett. She also starred in the staged reading of Vincent Crapelli's Otherwise, with Karen Ziemba and Laura Bonarrigo-Koffman.

She starred as Donna Sheridan in the Broadway production of Mamma Mia!, succeeding Carolee Carmello in the role on September 22, 2009, and leaving the show on October 10, 2010.

Leavel starred as Emily Hobbs in Elf the Musical on Broadway. The production opened November 14, 2010, at the Al Hirschfeld Theatre and ran through January 2, 2011. Following Elf, she appeared in the Broadway production of Baby It's You!, which began previews on March 26, 2011, and closed on September 4, 2011. Leavel earned a nomination for the Tony Award for Best Actress in a Musical at the 65th Tony Awards for her performance of Florence Greenberg in Baby It's You!

In November 2013, she appeared Off-Broadway at the Minetta Lane Theatre in Standing on Ceremony: The Gay Marriage Plays. In January and February 2012, she starred in a limited run of Boeing-Boeing at the Paper Mill Playhouse in Millburn, New Jersey.

Leavel was cast as Bea in the musical Something Rotten! and began the workshop/reading for it, held in 2014. Before the musical opened on Broadway (in March 2015) she was replaced by Heidi Blickenstaff because "the writers decided that the character needed to be younger so she could become pregnant, a key plot point."

In 2014, Leavel starred in the world premiere of the musical Dog and Pony at the Old Globe Theatre, San Diego. She starred in the musical The Prom which opened on Broadway in November 2018. For this, she was nominated for the 2019 Tony Award for Best Performance by Leading Actress in a Musical at the 73rd Tony Awards.

In 2022, she starred as Miranda Priestly in the Chicago world premiere production of The Devil Wears Prada. In 2024, Manhattan Theatre Club announced she would join Bernadette Peters and Lea Salonga in the 2025 Broadway mounting of the Stephen Sondheim musical celebration Old Friends. Prior to its Broadway bow at MTC's Samuel J. Friedman Theatre, Old Friends was presented by Los Angeles’ Center Theatre Group from February 8 through March 9, 2025. In the summer of 2026, she played the titular role in Hello, Dolly! at the Ogunquit Playhouse.

== Personal life ==
She is married to fellow actor Adam Heller.

== Credits ==
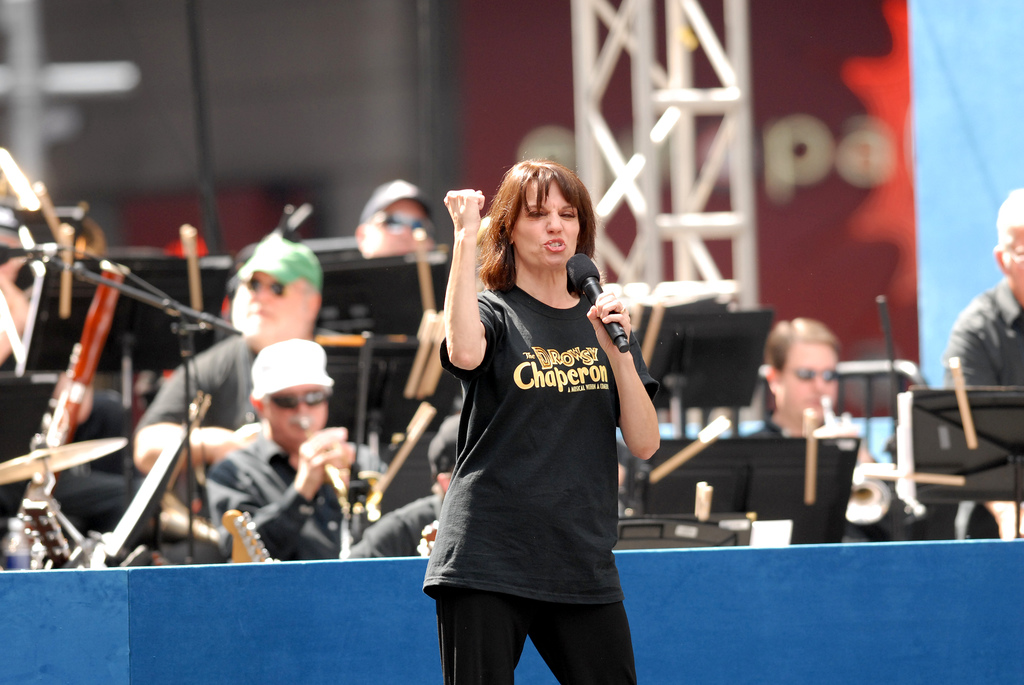
Broadway on Broadway, September 10, 2006

=== Broadway theatre ===
Year	Title	Role	Venue
1985	42nd Street	Annie Reilly	St. James Theatre
1992	Crazy for You	Tess Parker	Shubert Theatre
1994	Show Boat	Ellie	George Gershwin Theatre
1999	The Civil War	Mrs. Lydia Bixby/Mabel	St. James Theatre
2001	42nd Street	Dorothy Brock	Ford Center for the Performing Arts
2006	The Drowsy Chaperone	Beatrice Stockwell	Marquis Theatre
2008	Young Frankenstein	Frau Blucher	Hilton Theatre
2009	Mamma Mia!	Donna Sheridan	Winter Garden Theatre
2010	Elf	Emily Hobbs	Al Hirschfeld Theatre
2011	Baby It's You!	Florence Greenberg	Broadhurst Theatre
2017	Bandstand	Mrs. June Adams	Bernard B. Jacobs Theatre
2018	The Prom	Dee Dee Allen	Longacre Theatre
2023	Gutenberg! The Musical!	The Guest Producer	James Earl Jones Theatre
2024	Lempicka	The Baroness Cara Carolina Kuffner de Diószegh	Longacre Theatre
2025	Stephen Sondheim's Old Friends	Performer	Samuel J. Friedman Theatre

=== Film and television ===
Year	Title	Role	Notes
2004	Law & Order: Criminal Intent	Mom	Episode: "Silver Lining"
2009	ER	Amy Taylor	Episode: "And in the End..."
2009	The Unusuals	Ellen Baker	Episode: "The E.I.D."
2011–2012	Submissions Only	Val Reilly	2 episodes
2014	This Is Where I Leave You	Renee	
2020	The Walking Dead: World Beyond	Dr. K	Episode: "Brave"
2021	The Bite	Petra Bresser	Episode: "The First Wave"
2022	Ghosts of Christmas Always	Susan Kraine	Television film

=== Podcasts ===
Year	Title	Voice role	Ref.
2020–21	In Strange Woods	Sandra	

== Awards and nominations ==
Year	Award	Category	Work	Result
2006	Tony Award	Best Featured Actress in a Musical	The Drowsy Chaperone	Won
2006	Drama Desk Award	Outstanding Featured Actress in a Musical	The Drowsy Chaperone	Won
2006	Outer Critics Circle Award	Outstanding Featured Actress in a Musical	The Drowsy Chaperone	Won
2011	Tony Award	Best Actress in a Musical	Baby It's You!	Nominated
2011	Drama Desk Award	Outstanding Actress in a Musical	Baby It's You!	Nominated
2011	Outer Critics Circle Award	Outstanding Actress in a Musical	Baby It's You!	Nominated
2019	Tony Award	Best Actress in a Musical	The Prom	Nominated
2019	Drama Desk Award	Outstanding Actress in a Musical	The Prom	Nominated
2019	Drama League Award	Distinguished Performance	The Prom	Nominated
2019	Outer Critics Circle Award	Outstanding Actress in a Musical	The Prom	Nominated
