= The Shirelles =

African American girl group (1957–1982)

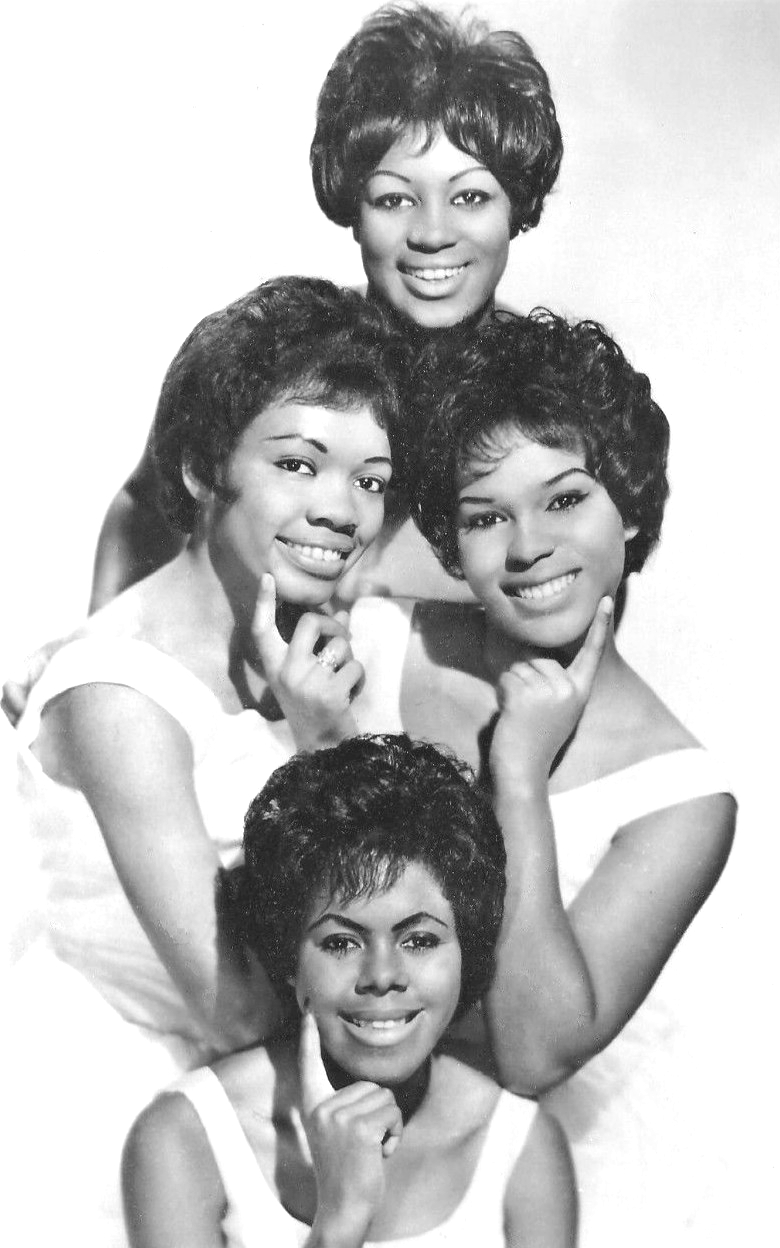
- The Shirelles in 1962; clockwise from top: Addie Harris, Shirley Owens, Beverly Lee, and Doris Coley

Background information
- Also known as: The Poquellos; Shirley & the Shirelles
- Origin: Passaic, New Jersey, U.S.
- Genres: R&B; doo-wop; pop; soul; rock
- Years active: 1957–1982
- Labels: Tiara; Decca; Scepter; Bell; RCA; Top Rank; Stateside; Pye International
- Past members: Shirley Owens; Doris Coley; Addie Harris; Beverly Lee

The Shirelles were an American girl group formed in Passaic, New Jersey, in 1957. They consisted of schoolmates Shirley Owens (later Shirley Alston Reeves), Doris Coley (later Doris Kenner-Jackson), Addie "Micki" Harris (later Addie Harris McFadden), and Beverly Lee.

Founded in 1957 for a talent show at their high school, they were signed by Florence Greenberg of Tiara Records. Their first single, "I Met Him on a Sunday", was released by Tiara and licensed by Decca Records in 1958. After a brief and unsuccessful period with Decca, they went with Greenberg to her newly formed company, Scepter Records. Working with Luther Dixon, the group rose to fame with "Tonight's the Night". After a successful period of collaboration with Dixon and promotion by Scepter, with seven top 20 hits, the Shirelles left Scepter in 1966. Afterwards, they were unable to maintain their previous popularity.

The Shirelles have been described as having a "naive schoolgirl sound" that contrasted with the sexual themes of many of their songs. Several of their hits used strings and featured the influence of Brazilian baião music. They have been credited with launching the girl group genre, with much of their music reflecting the genre's essence. Their acceptance by both white and black audiences, predating that of the Motown acts, has been noted as reflecting the early success of the Civil Rights Movement. They have received numerous honors, including the Pioneer Award from the Rhythm and Blues Foundation, as well as being inducted into the Rock and Roll Hall of Fame in 1996 and named one of the 100 Greatest Artists of All Time by Rolling Stone in 2004. Two of their songs, "Will You Love Me Tomorrow" and "Tonight's the Night", were selected by Rolling Stone on its list of the greatest songs of all time. In 2022, their debut album Tonight's the Night was selected by the Library of Congress for preservation in the National Recording Registry as being "culturally, historically, or aesthetically significant".

== Initial career and success ==
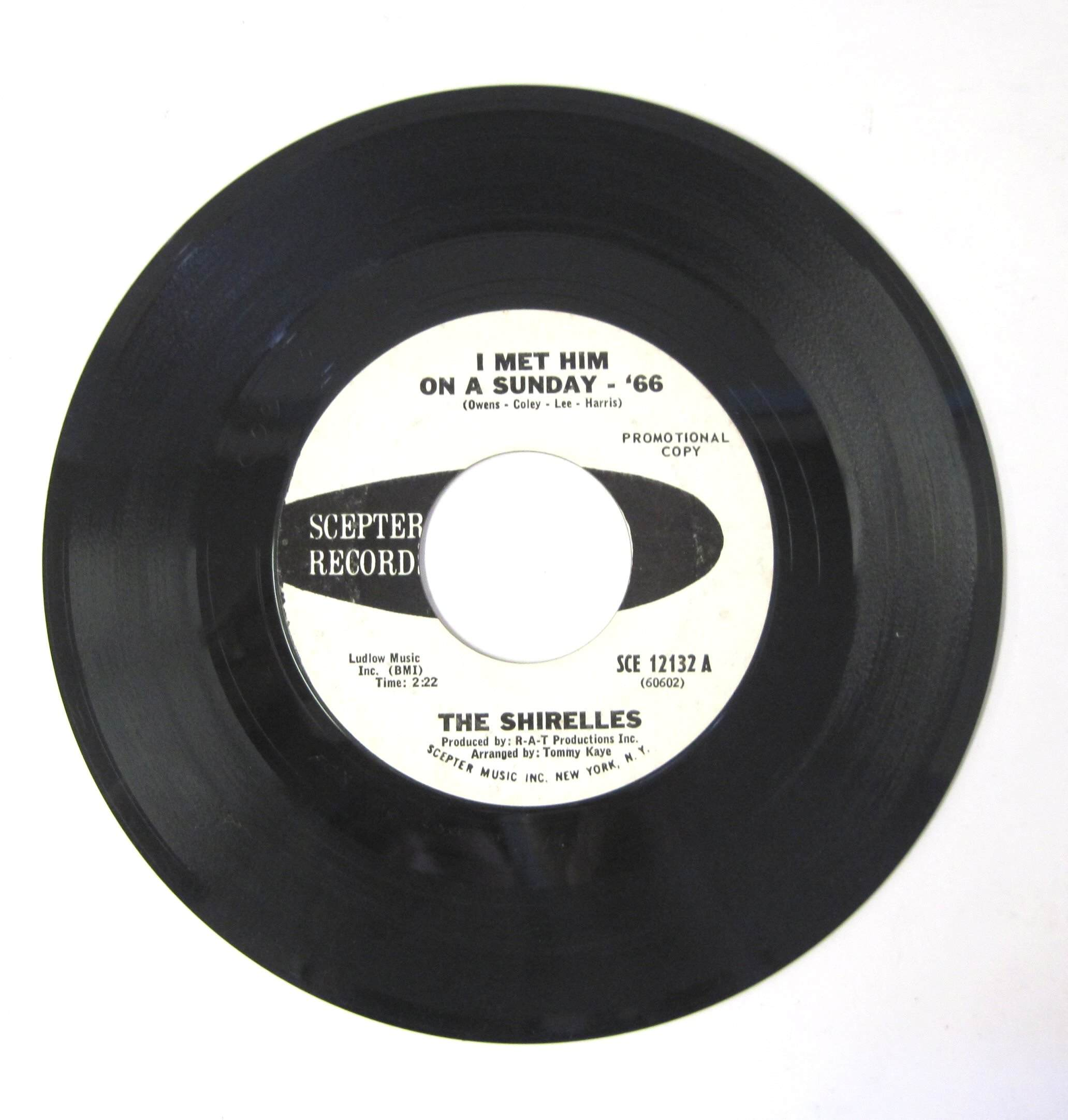
An updated version of the Shirelles' first song, "I Met Him on a Sunday" entitled "I Met Him on a Sunday '66"

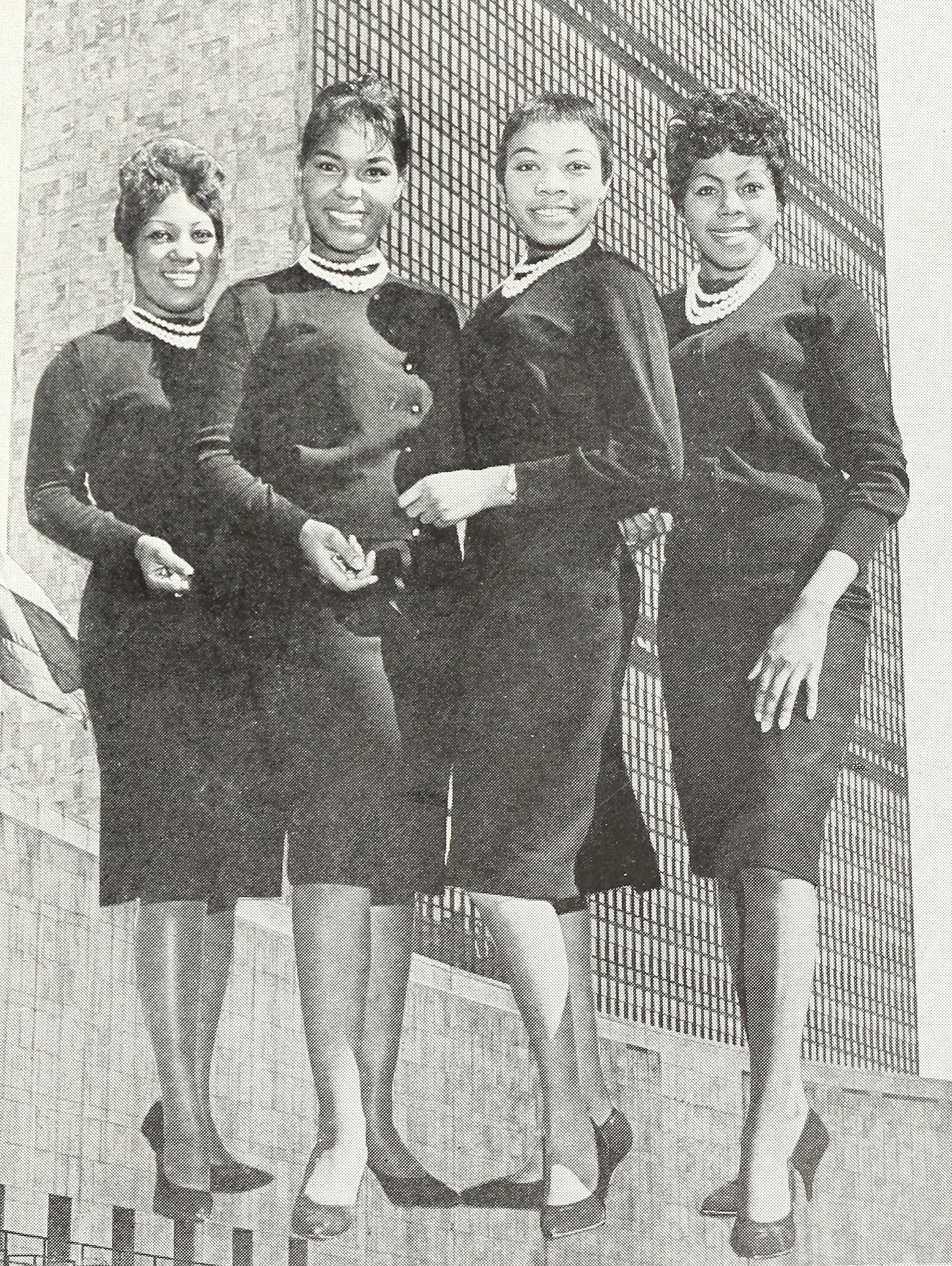
The Shirelles on the cover of Cash Box, 15 April 1961

The group that later became the Shirelles was formed in 1957 by four teenage girls from Passaic, New Jersey, under the name the Poquellos (or Pequellos). The founding members, Shirley Owens (born June 10, 1941, Henderson, NC), Doris Coley (August 2, 1941, Goldsboro, NC– February 4, 2000, Sacramento, CA), Addie "Micki" Harris (January 22, 1941, High Point, NC – June 10, 1982, Atlanta, Georgia), and Beverly Lee (born August 3, 1941, Passaic, NJ), entered a talent show at Passaic High School at the suggestion of a teacher. After hearing them sing "I Met Him on a Sunday", a song they had written for the show, their classmate Mary Jane Greenberg convinced the reluctant Poquellos to meet with her mother, Florence, the owner of Tiara Records. After several months of avoiding Greenberg and telling her that they were not interested in singing professionally, they were booked to Tiara. By the end of the year they had changed their name to the Shirelles, a combination of the first syllable of Owens's given name and -el, reminiscent of then-popular group the Chantels, after briefly using the name the Honeytunes. That year, they released their first song, "I Met Him on a Sunday"; after local success, it was licensed to Decca Records for national broadcast and charted at No. 50. The song was influenced by doo-wop, but infused with pop melodies.

Tiara Records, along with the Shirelles' contract, was sold to Decca Records in 1959 for $4,000; Greenberg stayed as the manager, securing performances for the group, including one at the Howard Theatre in Washington D.C. After two singles did poorly, including their first release—with Coley as lead vocalist—of "Dedicated to the One I Love", a cover of the "5" Royales song of the same name, Decca returned them to Greenberg and gave up on them, considering them a one-hit act. On Greenberg's new label, Scepter Records, they rereleased "Dedicated to the One I Love" as a single, which peaked at No. 89; Wayne Wadhams, David Nathan, and Susan Lindsay in Inside the Hits attribute the low rating to poor distribution. In order to better promote the group, Greenberg asked songwriter Luther Dixon, who had previously worked with Perry Como, Nat King Cole, and Pat Boone and co-written the 1959 hit "16 Candles", to write for and produce songs for them. Dixon accepted.

Their first single produced with Dixon, "Tonight's the Night", was released in 1960 and peaked at No. 39. The success of "Tonight's the Night" led to the girls being booked to perform with several major artists, such as Etta James and Little Richard, and facilitated Scepter's move to a larger office. It was followed by "Will You Love Me Tomorrow", written by husband-wife songwriting team Gerry Goffin and Carole King; the song went on to become the first Billboard number-one hit by an African-American girl group, possibly the first by any girl group. "Tonight's the Night" was later used as the title song for the 1961 album Tonight's the Night, which also included "Will You Love Me Tomorrow" and "Dedicated to the One I Love".

After the success of their singles, the Shirelles became frequent guests of Murray the K, who hosted them on his "All Star Rock Shows" on the New York radio station WINS. During this same period they reissued "Dedicated to the One I Love", which peaked at No. 3, followed by "Mama Said", then "Baby It's You", written by Burt Bacharach, Luther Dixon, and Mack David, "Soldier Boy", and "Boys", with saxophonist King Curtis.

In 1963 Dixon left Scepter, which presaged a tailing-off of the number of the Shirelles' singles to chart. However, they carried on performing and recording. Dionne Warwick replaced Owens and Coley, who took leave to marry their fiancés, in concerts and the group continued to record material. That year, their song "Foolish Little Girl" reached the pop/R&B Top 10, and they performed two songs, "31 Flavors" and "You Satisfy My Soul," for the soundtrack of the film It's a Mad, Mad, Mad, Mad World; "31 Flavors" was also used to promote Baskin-Robbins. However, later in 1963, the Shirelles learned that the trust, holding their royalties, that they were supposed to receive from Scepter on their 21st birthdays, did not exist. In response, they left the label, and later filed a breach of contract suit against the company. Scepter met this with a countersuit for quitting; both suits were withdrawn in 1965, after an agreement was reached. Knowing that Scepter had lied about the trust disappointed the Shirelles, who felt deceived. In a 1981 interview with Bruce Pollock, Owens said that Greenberg had put on a "mother routine", which the girls had "fall[en] for ... completely".

== Later career ==
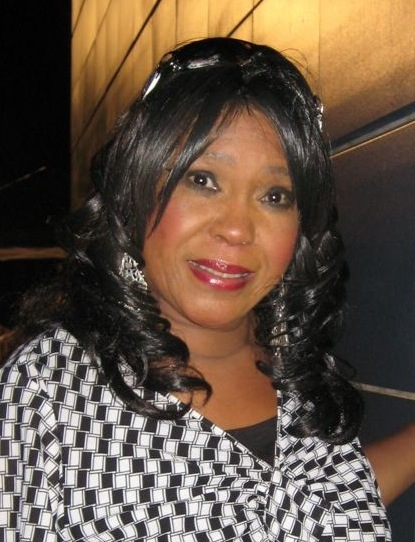
Owens left the group in 1975.

In later years, the Shirelles declined in popularity due in part to pressure from the British Invasion and the heavy competition from other girl groups, including the Chiffons, the Supremes, the Ronettes, Martha & the Vandellas, and the Crystals. During this period, Warwick often replaced Coley on stage due to the latter's family commitments. The Shirelles were still bound to Scepter and thus unable to record for another company until the end of their contract in 1966. Their last single to chart was 1967's "Last Minute Miracle", which peaked at No. 99.

After the commercial failure of their most recent releases, Coley left the group in 1968 to focus on her family. The remaining three Shirelles recorded songs for several labels, including Bell Records, RCA Victor, and United Artists until 1971. Afterwards, they toured singing their older songs, and participated in the filming of the 1973 documentary Let the Good Times Roll, recording two songs for it. Coley returned as lead singer in 1975, replacing Owens, who left that year to pursue a solo career. Addie "Micki" Harris collapsed of a heart attack in June 1982 in the lobby of Hyatt Regency in Atlanta, Georgia after two performances with the group. She was sent to the Grady Memorial Hospital, where she died at 12:50 a.m. on June 10, 1982. The following year, the remaining three original members performed "Will You Love Me Tomorrow" with Warwick on her album How Many Times Can We Say Goodbye.

== Current versions of the group ==
Until 2020, the remaining original members toured in different, separate groups, although the trademark to the Shirelles name was eventually acquired by Lee. One of the versions of the group had member Geraldine Crowell, who was the daughter of David Jones of The Rays. Shirley Owens performed on the Doo Wop 51 PBS special in 2000. She continued to tour under the name "Shirley Alston Reeves and her Shirelles". Shirley retired in 2020. Lee currently tours with new members, billed as "The Shirelles". Doris Coley died in Sacramento, California on February 4, 2000 of breast cancer.

== Deaths ==
Addie Harris died from a heart attack at the age of 41 on June 10, 1982.

Doris Coley died of breast cancer at the age of 58 on February 4, 2000.

== Style ==
Wadhams, Nathan, and Lindsay describe the style of the Shirelles early work as "tight, almost doo-wop harmony". Owens's vocals, described by rock n' roll writer Alwyn W. Turner as being "wonderfully expressive", were capable of sounding "almost, but not quite" out of tune, which in his opinion lent Owens an innocent sound in her songs; music critic Albin Zak describes her vocals as being able to intone desire and vulnerability. The other members, singing backup, also convey what Michael Campbell, a professor of music at Western Illinois University, calls a "naive schoolgirl sound". The lyrics sung by the Shirelles tended to be fairly simple and "barely" concealed the subtexts of the songs. The songs were implicitly directed at female listeners, with the male subjects of songs being referred to as "he" instead of "you"; this was a change from previous female-written songs, which tended to be more gender neutral, and helped pave the way for the "confessional" songs of 70s singers like Joni Mitchell and Carole King.

Musically, their works with Dixon were influenced by Brazilian baião and featured numerous instances of syncopation.

== Influence ==
Steve Huey of AllMusic notes that the Shirelles defined "the so-called girl group sound with their soft, sweet harmonies and yearning innocence", with their songs predating Motown in their widespread crossing of racial demographics, both in the US and in Britain. He also notes that they spawned "legions of imitators", and laid a blueprint for future female pop stars to follow. Turner writes that the Shirelles "launched [the girl group] genre", noting that their early work already included "the essence" of the genre; Alwyn Zak expands on the statement, noting that the influx of female groups started after the success of "Will You Love Me Tomorrow".

Michael Campbell notes that the Shirelles' success reflected the Civil Rights Movement. He indicates that works such as "Will You Love Me Tomorrow", written by a white couple, produced by an African-American man, with vocals by young African-American women and strings sounding like they were targeted at a white audience, conveyed a "color-blind" message on top of its more obvious sexual one.

The Beatles were large admirers, according to George Harrison, "We always loved those American girl groups, like the Shirelles and the Ronettes, so yeah we developed our harmonies from trying to come up with an English, male version of their vocal feel." Their debut album, Please Please Me included cover versions of two songs by the Shirelles, "Baby It's You", and "Boys", and a third song from the album, "P.S. I Love You" was according to John Lennon, Paul's attempt at "trying to write a "Soldier Boy" like the Shirelles."

== Accolades ==
In 1994, the Shirelles were honored by the Rhythm and Blues Foundation with the Pioneer Award for their contributions to music. The award was accepted by Owens, Lee, and Kenner. As Coley was accepting her award, she said "This is dedicated to the one I love", and sang an impromptu rendition of "Soldier Boy" together with Owens and Lee. Two years later they were inducted into the Rock and Roll Hall of Fame, together with Gladys Knight & the Pips. At the ceremony in the Waldorf-Astoria Hotel in New York, the three surviving members sang a medley of songs after being presented the awards by Merry Clayton, Marianne Faithfull, and Darlene Love. In 2002, they were inducted into the Vocal Group Hall of Fame. Lee and Owens accepted the award.

In 2004, Rolling Stone ranked them No. 76 on their list of the 100 Greatest Artists of All Time. Paul Shaffer, who did the write-up, wrote that the girl-group sound, originated by them, was "everything to [him]"; he also described their impromptu performance of "Soldier Boy" as inspiring. They also included two of the Shirelles' songs, "Will You Love Me Tomorrow" and "Tonight's the Night", on their list of the 500 Greatest Songs of All Time. In the 2010 edition, "Will You Love Me Tomorrow" was ranked 126th, while "Tonight's the Night" was ranked 409th. The Shirelles' 1963 Greatest Hits album was included in Robert Christgau's "Basic Record Library" of 1950s and 1960s recordings, published in Christgau's Record Guide: Rock Albums of the Seventies (1981). He later characterized it as "merely one of the greatest phonograph albums ever made available to the general public".

In September 2008, the Shirelles' hometown of Passaic honored the group by renaming a section of Paulison Avenue between Passaic and Pennington Avenues (the section where Passaic High School is located) "Shirelles Boulevard". The dedication ceremony was attended by both surviving Shirelles. Owens said that it was different from they were inducted into the Hall of Fame, as it was their home town. She noted that "the people who loves [sic] us and we loved are right here."

In 2022, their debut album Tonight's the Night was selected by the Library of Congress for preservation in the National Recording Registry as being "culturally, historically, or aesthetically significant".

== Stage musical ==
The Shirelles' story was shown in Baby It's You! (a musical revue written by Floyd Mutrux and Colin Escott), which follows the story of Greenberg and Scepter Records. The revue played on Broadway for 148 performances, opening at the Broadhurst Theatre on April 27, 2011, and closing on September 4 of the same year. The use of their likenesses without permission led to Lee, as well as the estates of Coley and Harris, to sue Warner Bros.

== Discography ==
=== Albums ===
Year	Album	Billboard 200	Record label
1960	Tonight's the Night	—	Scepter Records
1961	The Shirelles Sing to Trumpets and Strings	—	Scepter Records
1962	The Shirelles and King Curtis Give a Twist Party (with King Curtis)	—	Scepter Records
1962	Baby It's You	59	Scepter Records
1963	Foolish Little Girl	68	Scepter Records
1963	It's a Mad, Mad, Mad, Mad World	—	Scepter Records
1964	The Shirelles Sing the Golden Oldies	—	Scepter Records
1965	Hear & Now	—	Pricewise Records
1965	Swing the Most	—	Pricewise Records
1967	Spontaneous Combustion	—	Scepter Records
1971	Happy and In Love	—	RCA Records
1972	The Shirelles	—	RCA Records
1973	Eternally, Soul	—	Scepter Records
"—" denotes releases that did not chart.

=== Compilation albums ===
Year	Album	Billboard 200	Record label
1963	The Shirelles' Greatest Hits	19	Scepter Records
1964	The Shirelles Sing the Golden Oldies	—	Scepter Records
1967	The Shirelles's Greatest Hits Vol. II	—	Scepter Records
1972	Remember When Volume 1	—	Wand Records
1972	Remember When Volume 2	—	Wand Records
1973	The Shirelles Sing Their Very Best	—	Springboard
1975	The Very Best of the Shirelles	—	United Artists Records
1984	Anthology 1959–1964	—	Rhino Records
"—" denotes releases that did not chart.

=== Singles ===
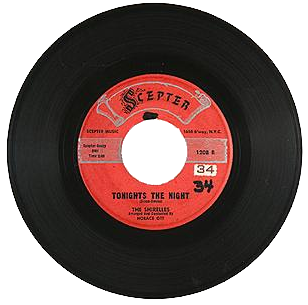
"Tonight's The Night" was their first song to break the Top 40

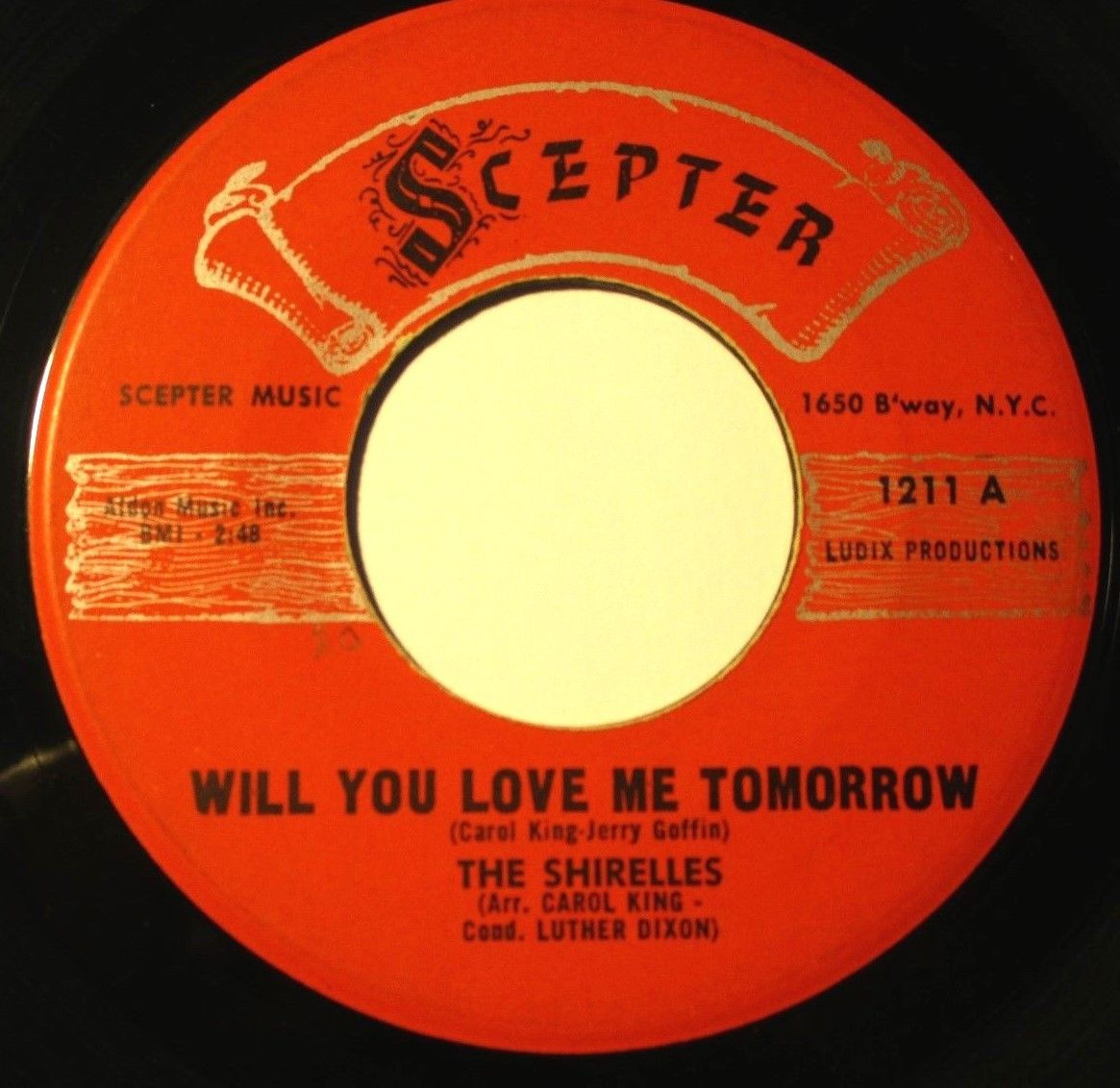
"Will You Love Me Tomorrow" was the Shirelles' first No. 1 hit

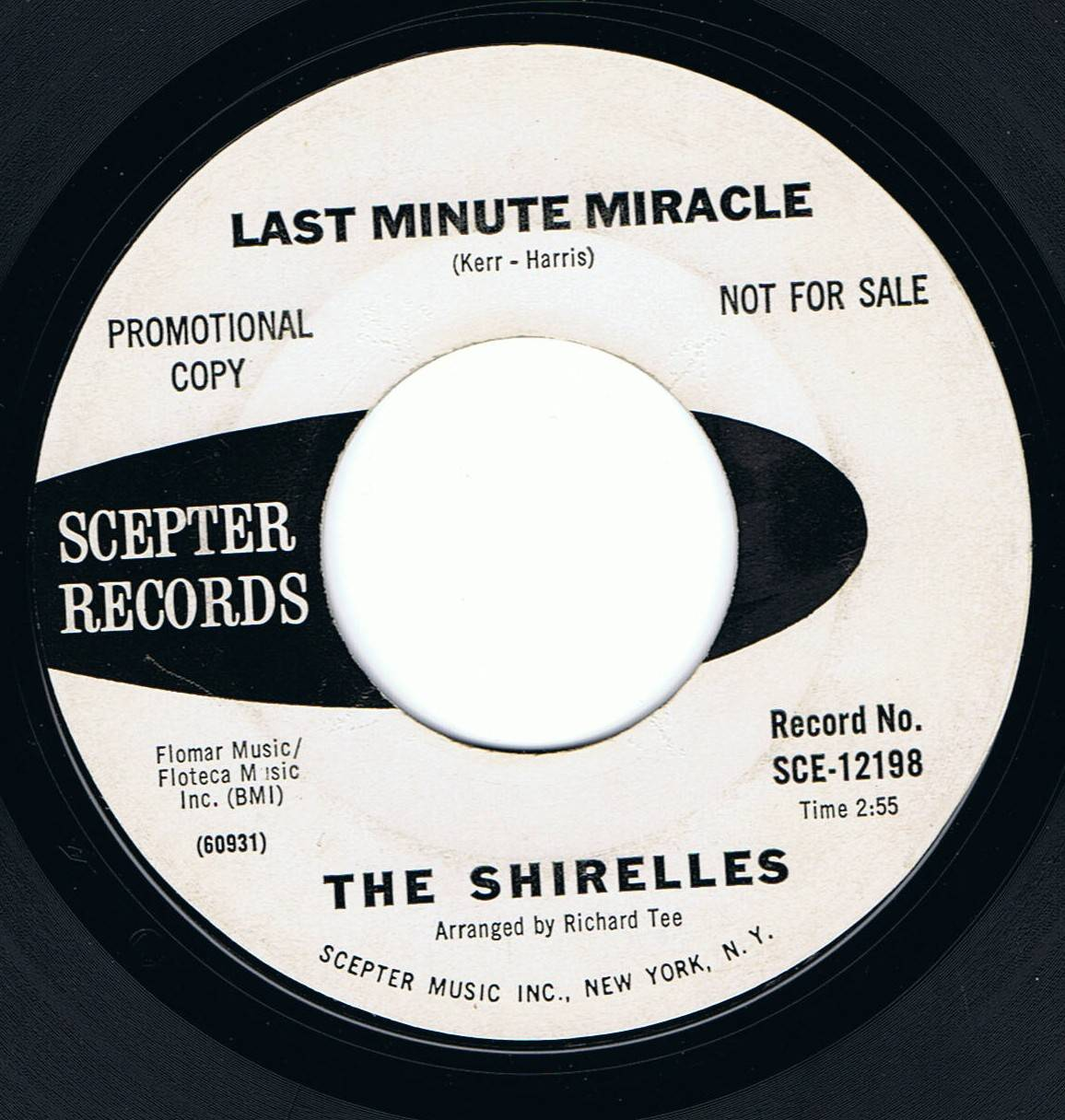
"Last Minute Miracle", the last single by the Shirelles to chart

Year	Single (A-side, B-side) Both sides from same album except where indicated	Chart positions				Album
Year	Single (A-side, B-side) Both sides from same album except where indicated	US	US R&B	CAN	UK	Album
1958	"I Met Him on a Sunday (Ronde-Ronde)" b/w "I Want You to Be My Boyfriend"	49	—	17	—	Non-album tracks
1958	"My Love Is a Charm" b/w "Slop Time"	—	—	—	—	Non-album tracks
1958	"I Got the Message" b/w "Stop Me"	—	—	—	—	Non-album tracks
1959	"Dedicated to the One I Love" b/w "Look a Here Baby" (Non-album track)	83	—	—	—	Tonight's the Night
1959	"Doin' the Ronde" b/w "A Teardrop and A Lollipop" (Non-album track)	—	—	—	—	Tonight's the Night
1960	"Please Be My Boyfriend" b/w "I Saw a Tear" (from The Shirelles Sing to Trumpets and Strings)	—	—	—	—	The Shirelles' Greatest Hits Vol. II
1960	"Tonight's the Night" b/w "The Dance Is Over"	39	14	—	—	Tonight's the Night
1960	"Will You Love Me Tomorrow" b/w "Boys"	1	2	2	4	Tonight's the Night
1961	"Dedicated to the One I Love" (reissue) b/w "Look a Here Baby" (Non-album track)	3	2	13	—	Tonight's the Night
1961	"Mama Said" b/w "Blue Holiday"	4	2	13	—	The Shirelles Sing to Trumpets and Strings
1961	"A Thing of the Past" b/w "What a Sweet Thing That Was" (from The Shirelles Sing to Trumpets and Strings)	41 54	26	40 40	— —	Baby It's You
1961	"Big John (Ain't You Gonna Marry Me)" b/w "Twenty-One"	21	2	—	—	Baby It's You
1961	"Baby It's You" b/w "Things I Want to Hear (Pretty Words)"	8 107	3	18 —	— —	Baby It's You
1962	"Soldier Boy" b/w "Love Is a Swingin' Thing" (from Give a Twist Party)	1 109	3 —	1	23 —	Baby It's You
1962	"Welcome Home, Baby" b/w "Mama, Here Comes the Bride"	22 104	20 —	31	— —	Give a Twist Party (With King Curtis)
1962	"Stop the Music" b/w "It's Love That Really Counts (In the Long Run)"	36 102	— —	—	— —	The Shirelles' Greatest Hits
1962	"Everybody Loves a Lover" b/w "I Don't Think So" (from Foolish Little Girl)	19	15	26	—	The Shirelles' Greatest Hits
1963	"Foolish Little Girl" b/w "Not for All the Money in the World"	4 100	9 —	8	38 —	Foolish Little Girl
1963	"Don't Say Goodnight and Mean Goodbye" b/w "I Didn't Mean to Hurt You"	26	—	—	—	Foolish Little Girl
1963	"What Does a Girl Do?" b/w "Don't Let It Happen to Us" (Non-album track)	53	*	—	—	The Shirelles Swing the Most
1963	"It's a Mad, Mad, Mad, Mad World" b/w "31 Flavors"	92 97	*	—	— —	It's a Mad, Mad, Mad, Mad World
1964	"Tonight You're Gonna Fall in Love with Me" b/w "20th Century Rock N' Roll" (from It's a Mad, Mad, Mad, Mad World)	57	*	38	—	Hear & Now
1964	"Sha-La-La" b/w "His Lips Get in the Way" (from The Shirelles Swing the Most)	69	*	—	—	Hear & Now
1964	"Thank You Baby" b/w "Dooms Day" (from Hear & Now)	63	*	—	—	The Shirelles' Greatest Hits Vol. II
1964	"Maybe Tonight" b/w "Lost Love"	88 125	*	—	— —	Hear & Now
1964	"Are You Still My Baby" b/w "I Saw a Tear" (from The Shirelles Sing to Trumpets and Strings)	91	*	45	—	Non-album tracks
1965	"Shhh, I'm Watching the Movie" b/w "A Plus B"	—	—	—	—	Non-album tracks
1965	"March (You'll Be Sorry)" b/w "Everybody's Goin' Mad" (from It's a Mad, Mad, Mad, Mad World)	108	—	—	—	Non-album tracks
1965	"My Heart Belongs to You" b/w "Love That Man" (Non-album track)	125	—	—	—	The Shirelles' Greatest Hits Vol. II
1965	"Mama, My Soldier Boy Is Coming Home" b/w "Soldier Boy" (from Baby, It's You)	—	—	—	—	Non-album track
1966	"I Met Him on a Sunday - '66" b/w "Love That Man" (Non-album track)	—	—	—	—	The Shirelles' Greatest Hits Vol. II
1966	"Que Sera Sera" b/w "Till My Baby Comes Home"	—	—	—	—	Remember When
1966	"Shades of Blue" b/w "When the Boys Talk About the Girls" (from Remember When)	122	—	—	—	Non-album tracks
1966	"Teasin' Me" b/w "Look Away"	—	—	—	—	Non-album tracks
1967	"Don't Go Home (My Little Darlin')" b/w "Nobody Baby After You" (Non-album track)	110	—	—	—	The Shirelles' Greatest Hits Vol. II
1967	"Bright Shiny Colors" b/w "Too Much of a Good Thing"	—	—	—	—	Non-album tracks
1967	"Last Minute Miracle" b/w "No Doubt About It"	99	41	—	—	Spontaneous Combustion
1968	"Sweet Sweet Lovin'" b/w "Don't Mess with Cupid"	—	—	—	—	Non-album tracks
1968	"Call Me (If You Want Me)" b/w "There's a Storm Going On in My Heart"	—	—	—	—	Non-album tracks
1969	"A Most Unusual Boy" b/w "Look What You've Done to My Heart"	—	—	—	—	Non-album tracks
1969	"Playthings" b/w "Looking Glass"	—	—	—	—	Non-album tracks
1969	"Go Away and Find Yourself" b/w "Never Give You Up (Never Gonna Give You Up)"	—	—	—	—	Non-album tracks
1970	"There Goes My Baby/Be My Baby" b/w "Strange, I Love You"	—	—	—	—	Non-album tracks
1970	"It's Gonna Take a Miracle" b/w "Lost"	—	—	—	—	Non-album tracks
1970	"Dedicated to the One I Love" (new version) b/w "Take Me"	—	—	—	—	Non-album tracks
1971	"No Sugar Tonight" b/w "Strange, I Love You"	—	—	—	—	Happy and In Love
1972	"Sunday Dreaming" b/w "Brother, Brother"	—	—	—	—	The Shirelles
1973	"Let's Give Each Other Love" b/w "Deep in the Night" (from The Shirelles)	—	—	—	—	Non-album tracks
1973	"Do What You've a Mind To" b/w "Touch the Wind"	—	—	—	—	Non-album tracks
"—" denotes releases that did not chart or were not released in that territory.

* no R&B Charts printed by Billboard during these chart runs
