= Lovin' Up a Storm (Jerry Lee Lewis song) =

Song by Jerry Lee Lewis

Single by Jerry Lee Lewis and His Pumping Piano
- A-side: "Lovin' Up a Storm" "Big Blon' Baby"
- Released: February or March 1959
- Genre: Rock and roll
- Label: Sun
- Songwriter(s): Allyson R. Khent; Luther Dixon

Jerry Lee Lewis singles chronology
"I'll Sail My Ship Alone" / "It Hurt Me So" (1958)	"Lovin' Up a Storm" / "Big Blon' Baby" (1959)	"Let's Talk About Us" / "The Ballad of Billy Joe" (1959)

"Lovin' Up a Storm" is a song written by Allyson R. Khent and Luther Dixon and originally recorded by Jerry Lee Lewis, who released it as a single, with "Big Blon' Baby" on the other side, in 1959 on Sun Records.

The song has been covered by a number of artists.

== Track listing ==
7" single (Sun 317, 1959)
No.	Title	Length
1.	"Lovin' Up a Storm"	1:49
2.	"Big Blon' Baby"	1:38

== Charts ==
Chart (1959)	Peak position
UK Singles (OCC)	28
