= Soldier Boy (The Shirelles song) =

Single by The Shirelles

from the album Baby It's You
- B-side: "Love Is a Swingin' Thing"
- Released: March 1962
- Recorded: Bell Sound (New York City)
- Genre: R&B
- Length: 2:42
- Label: Scepter (Florence Greenberg-Owner)
- Songwriters: Luther Dixon, Florence Greenberg
- Producer: Luther Dixon

The Shirelles singles chronology
"Baby It's You" (1962)	"Soldier Boy" (1962)	"Welcome Home, Baby" (1962)

"Soldier Boy" is a song written by Luther Dixon and Florence Greenberg and made famous by the girl group the Shirelles. Released as a single in 1962, it met with great success, topping the US Billboard Hot 100 for three consecutive weeks. Billboard ranked it as the No. 10 song for 1962.

== Background ==
Record executive Florence Greenberg, founder of Scepter Records (the Shirelles' record label), co-wrote the song with Luther Dixon, which was originally titled "I'll Be True to You". The main frame of the lyrics make no mention of a soldier. It was only while recording at Bell Sound Studios that the Shirelles decided upon a much better title to reflect the narrative, the profession of someone's love for the titular soldier boy in which she promises to remain true to him while he's away. The song was released as a single by The Shirelles in 1962 and met with great success, topping the US Billboard Hot 100.

== In popular culture ==
- The recording was used in the film The Wanderers (1979).
- The recording was used in the television series Tour of Duty season 1 episode "Battling Baker Brothers" (1987)
- The recording was used in the film Born on the Fourth of July (1989)
- Actress Brittany Murphy sings the song in the 2001 movie Riding in Cars with Boys.
- The recording was used in the television series 11.22.63 (2016) episode 7 "Soldier Boy"
- The recording was used in the film One Battle After Another (2025).

== Charts ==
Chart (1962)	Peak position
Canada (CHUM Chart) (3 weeks)	1
New Zealand (Lever Hit Parade)	1
US Billboard Hot 100	1
US R&B	3
UK Singles Chart	23

== Cover versions ==
- "Soldier Boy" was covered by American country music artist Donna Fargo in 1991. Her version peaked at number 71 on the Billboard Hot Country Singles & Tracks chart.
- It was recorded by Diane Renay in 1964.
- "Soldier Boy" was covered by the Mexican children's group La Onda Vaselina in 1989, under the title "Yo te esperaré" and adapted by the composer and Mexican singer Julissa.
