= Dedicated to the One I Love =

1959 single by the Shirelles

Single by the Shirelles

from the album Tonight's the Night
- B-side: "Look a Here Baby"
- Released: May 1959
- Recorded: Beltone (New York City)
- Genre: Pop; soul
- Length: 2:03
- Label: Scepter
- Songwriters: Lowman Pauling; Ralph Bass
- Producers: Florence Greenberg; Stan Greenberg

The Shirelles singles chronology
"I Got The Message" (1958)	"Dedicated to the One I Love" (1959)	"Tonight's the Night" (1960)

"Dedicated to the One I Love" is a song written by Lowman Pauling and Ralph Bass that was a hit for the "5" Royales, the Shirelles, the Mamas & the Papas and Bitty McLean. Pauling was the guitarist of the "5" Royales, the group that recorded the original version of the song, produced by Bass, in 1957. Their version was re-released in 1961 and charted at number 81 on the Billboard Hot 100.

== The Shirelles version ==
A cover version recorded by American girl group the Shirelles reached number 83 in 1959. This version was re-released in 1961 and reached number three on the Billboard Hot 100 chart and number two on Billboard's Hot R&B Sides. The song was subsequently included on their 1961 album Tonight's the Night. In Canada, the re-release reached number 13.

== The Mamas & the Papas version ==
"Dedicated to the One I Love"
- West German picture sleeve

Single by the Mamas & the Papas

from the album The Mamas & The Papas Deliver
- B-side: "Free Advice"
- Released: February 1967
- Recorded: November 26, 1966; Western Recorders, 6000 Sunset Boulevard, Hollywood, California
- Genre: Pop; soft rock
- Length: 2:56
- Label: Dunhill
- Songwriters: Lowman Pauling; Ralph Bass
- Producer: Lou Adler

The Mamas & the Papas singles chronology
"Words of Love" (1966)	"Dedicated to the One I Love" (1967)	"Creeque Alley" (1967)

In 1967, a subsequent and slightly more popular cover version by the Mamas & the Papas released on the Dunhill label went to number 2 on the Billboard Hot 100, kept from number 1 by "Happy Together" by The Turtles. This version also reached number 2 on the UK's Record Retailer chart. The lead singer on the first verse was Michelle Phillips—the first time that Phillips was given the lead. The song was also included on the group's 1967 album The Mamas & The Papas Deliver.

The song has the same mix on both the single and album versions, unlike some of their other tracks. However, there are different versions of the song:

- The mono single and mono album versions are the same. Michelle's voice is double-tracked but mixed to sound like one voice. Cass's vocals and the piano are more prominent. The song ends with all four members singing in harmony.
- The stereo album version moves the piano to the background, and Cass's voice is more blended with the others, especially at the end, where her vocals are almost absent.

Cash Box called the single a "groovey, harmonic, soft rock venture that is sure to please all of the group's many fans."

The group appeared on The Ed Sullivan Show in 1967 to perform both this song and the single to follow, "Creeque Alley". Although the single has a running time of 2:56, and the group performed the song in its entirety, edited versions of the song appear on internet video sites with a much shorter running time.

=== In popular culture ===
DTV, in 1984, set the Mamas & the Papas version of the song to Sleeping Beauty and was featured on the VHS DTV: Groovin' for a 60's Afternoon.

The song was featured in a 2025 trailer for the British soap opera EastEnders, which promoted the long-awaited return of Zoe Slater (Michelle Ryan). The trailer showcased Zoe’s reunion with her mother Kat Moon (Jessie Wallace) after two decades apart.

The song also appeared in the 8th episode of the 6th season of Canadian hit TV comedy Schitt's Creek, closing out the episode as Alexis Rose (Annie Murphy) and Ted Mullens (Dustin Milligan) share an important moment in their romantic relationship.

=== Personnel ===
According to the AFM contract sheet, the following musicians played on the track.

- John Phillips – session leader; guitar
- Hal Blaine – contractor; drums
- Gary Coleman – percussion
- Bones Howe
- Larry Knechtel – keyboards
- Joe Osborn – bass guitar
- Denny Doherty – vocals
- Tommy Tedesco – guitars

=== Charts ===
Chart (1967)	Peak position
Australia (Go-Set)	5
Belgium (Ultratop 50 Flanders)	13
Belgium (Ultratop 50 Wallonia)	8
Canada (RPM)	3
Ireland (IRMA)	7
Netherlands (Single Top 100)	15
New Zealand (Listener)	10
South Africa (Springbok)	2
UK Record Retailer	2
US Billboard Hot 100	2
US Cash Box Top 100	2
West Germany (Musikmarkt)	26

== Other versions ==
- 1965: Johnny Preston released a version of the song as the B-side of his single "Running Bear '65".
- 1965: Reparata and the Delrons covered the song on their LP Whenever a Teenager Cries.
- 1967: Kameleoni covered the song, making it the title track of their second EP.
- 1967: The Lettermen released a version of the song on their album Spring!
- 1968: The O'Kaysions released a version of the song on their debut album, Girl Watcher and as the B-side of their single, "Love Machine".
- 1972: The Temprees' version reached number 17 on Billboard's Soul Singles chart and number 93 on the Billboard Hot 100.
- 1973: Ruben and the Jets released it on their album For Real!
- 1981: Bernadette Peters recorded a version, which reached number 65 on the Billboard Hot 100.
- 1993: Laura Nyro included the song as a part of a medley paired with "I'm So Proud" on her album Walk the Dog and Light the Light
- 1994: Bitty McLean recorded a reggae remake, which reached number 6 on the UK Singles Chart.
- 1996: Linda Ronstadt made it the title song of her album Dedicated to the One I Love.
- 1998: Tanya Stephens included the song on her album Ruff Rider.
- 2000: Holly Cole included the song on her album Romantically Helpless.
- 2001: Rosie & the Originals recorded an a cappella version for their album Angel Baby Revisited.
- 2007: Renée Geyer recorded a version on her album Dedicated.
- 2013: Wilson Phillips included it on their album Dedicated.
