= Doris Coley =

American singer (1941–2000)

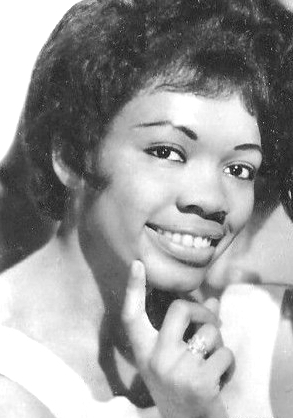
- Coley in 1962

Background information
- Also known as: Doris Kenner Jackson
- Born: August 2, 1941; Goldsboro, North Carolina, U.S.
- Origin: Passaic, New Jersey, U.S.
- Died: February 4, 2000 (aged 58) Sacramento, California, U.S.
- Genres: R&B, pop, soul
- Occupation: Singer
- Years active: 1957–2000
- Formerly of: The Shirelles

Doris Coley (August 2, 1941 – February 4, 2000) was an American musician, who was best known as a member (and occasional lead singer) of the Shirelles. Doris was the lead singer on their biggest hit, "Dedicated to the One I Love". She initially left the group in 1968, but returned in 1975 after original lead singer, Shirley Owens, left. Through marriages, she became Doris Coley Kenner and later Doris Kenner Jackson.

== Life ==
Coley was born in Goldsboro, North Carolina to Zeno and Ruth Best Coley as the oldest of five children but moved with her family to Passaic, New Jersey after her mother's death. With schoolmates Shirley Owens (later Shirley Alston Reeves), Addie "Micki" Harris and Beverly Lee, she formed the Shirelles in Passaic in 1958, one of the first all-girl groups of the rock era. The four teenagers did not graduate with their class of 1958, but they earned diplomas later. They performed their self-written "I Met Him on a Sunday" for Florence Greenberg and was signed to her Tiara label (the song was so popular, it was bought by Decca Records).

Coley was married two times. Coley married Alfonza Kenner, who she had two sons with, Gary and Antonio, and they remained married until his death. She married Wallace Jackson and have twins, Staci (later Richardson) and Tracy Jackson. Many years later, in 1994, when the Rhythm and Blues Foundation gave the Shirelles a Heritage Award, Kenner sang with the group's other surviving members, Alston Reeves and Lee, for the first time in 19 years (Harris having died in 1982). The threesome met again when they were inducted into the Rock 'n' Roll Hall of Fame in 1996.

== Death ==
Coley died of breast cancer at the age of 58 on February 4, 2000.
