= Luther Dixon =

American songwriter, record producer, and singer

- Born: August 7, 1931; Jacksonville, Florida, U.S.
- Origin: Brooklyn, New York, U.S.
- Died: October 22, 2009 (aged 78) Jacksonville, Florida, U.S.
- Genres: R&B; doo-wop; pop; soul; rock and roll
- Occupations: Singer; songwriter; record producer
- Instrument: Vocals
- Years active: 1954–late 1960s
- Labels: Chess; Scepter; Wand; Ludix; Musicor

Luther Dixon (August 7, 1931 – October 22, 2009) was an American songwriter, record producer, and singer. Dixon's songs achieved their greatest success in the 1950s and 1960s, and were recorded by Elvis Presley, the Beatles, the Jackson 5, B.B. King, Jerry Lee Lewis, Dusty Springfield, Jimmy Reed and others. As a producer, Dixon helped create the signature sound of the girl group the Shirelles.

== Early life ==
Dixon was born in Jacksonville, Florida, but his family moved to Brooklyn, New York, when he was young. He learned to sing in church.

== Career ==
Dixon began his professional career in 1954 with the Four Buddies, a doo-wop group led by Larry Harrison, in which Dixon sang baritone and occasionally played guitar. The Four Buddies recorded for Savoy Records, but also as the Barons for Decca Records and as The Buddies for Glory Records. The group disbanded in 1955, but Dixon and Harrison continued writing songs together. Their biggest hit was "Why Baby Why", recorded by Pat Boone, which peaked at No. 5 in 1957.

Dixon and Billy Dawn Smith wrote the 1957 Perry Como song "Just Born (To Be Your Baby)", which reached No. 12. In 1958, Bobby Darin recorded "All the Way Home", written by Dixon and Otis Blackwell, which was released on Darin's 1960 album For Teenagers Only. Dixon and Clyde Otis wrote the song "Doncha' Think It's Time", recorded by Elvis Presley in 1958 and included on his famous 1959 album, 50,000,000 Elvis Fans Can't Be Wrong. Also in 1958, Dixon and Allyson Khent wrote "16 Candles", which was recorded by the Crests and reached No. 2. They also co-wrote 'Lovin' Up A Storm', which, when recorded by Jerry Lee Lewis, reached No. 29 in the UK charts in 1959, (Official Charts Company).

In 1960, after being approached by Florence Greenberg of Scepter Records, Dixon began working with the Shirelles. The first song Dixon produced with the Shirelles was "Tonight's the Night", co-written by the group's lead singer Shirley Owens. The song reached No. 39 in 1960, and another recording of the song by the Chiffons reached No. 76. The Shirelles then reached No. 1 with "Will You Love Me Tomorrow" (written by Carole King and Gerry Goffin). Dixon wrote the B-side to that single, "Boys". The Shirelles' 1961 song "Baby It's You", co-written by Dixon under the pseudonym "Barney Williams", Burt Bacharach, and Mack David, reached No. 8. Both "Boys" and "Baby It's You" were later recorded by the Beatles on their debut LP, Please Please Me. The Shirelles' 1962 song "Soldier Boy", written by Dixon and Florence Greenberg, was their final song to reach No. 1.

Greenberg started a second record company, Wand Records, in 1961. Dixon wrote and produced many songs for the Wand and Scepter labels, including the 1961 Chuck Jackson single "I Don't Want to Cry", co-written by Jackson himself, which reached No. 36. Jimmy Reed's 1961 hit "Big Boss Man" was written by Dixon and Al Smith. This song was listed by the Rock and Roll Hall of Fame as one of the 500 "Songs That Shaped Rock and Roll".

With these successes, Dixon was approached by Capitol Records to set up his own record label, Ludix Records, but Ludix was unsuccessful. In 1966, Dixon was producing the Platters for Musicor Records. Their songs "I Love You 1000 Times" (No. 31, 1966) and "With This Ring" (No. 14, 1967)—their biggest hits since leaving Mercury Records—were both produced and co-written by Dixon.

By the late 1960s, Dixon's style of music had greatly faded from popular music charts. He received a surge of popularity after "16 Candles" was used in the 1973 George Lucas film American Graffiti, and again when the 1984 John Hughes film Sixteen Candles included a performance of the song by the Stray Cats. "Boys" was included in the 2009 video game The Beatles: Rock Band. Dixon's song "Never Let Me Go" was performed by Jane Monheit in the film adaptation of Kazuo Ishiguro's novel with same title. Dixon was nominated for the Songwriters Hall of Fame one week before he died.

== Personal life ==
Dixon was married to soul singer Inez Foxx, with whom he co-wrote "I Love You 1000 Times". They later divorced. Dixon died in his hometown of Jacksonville, Florida. He was also married to Sonia Dixon (née Francis) which also ended in divorce.
