= Scepter Records =

US record label

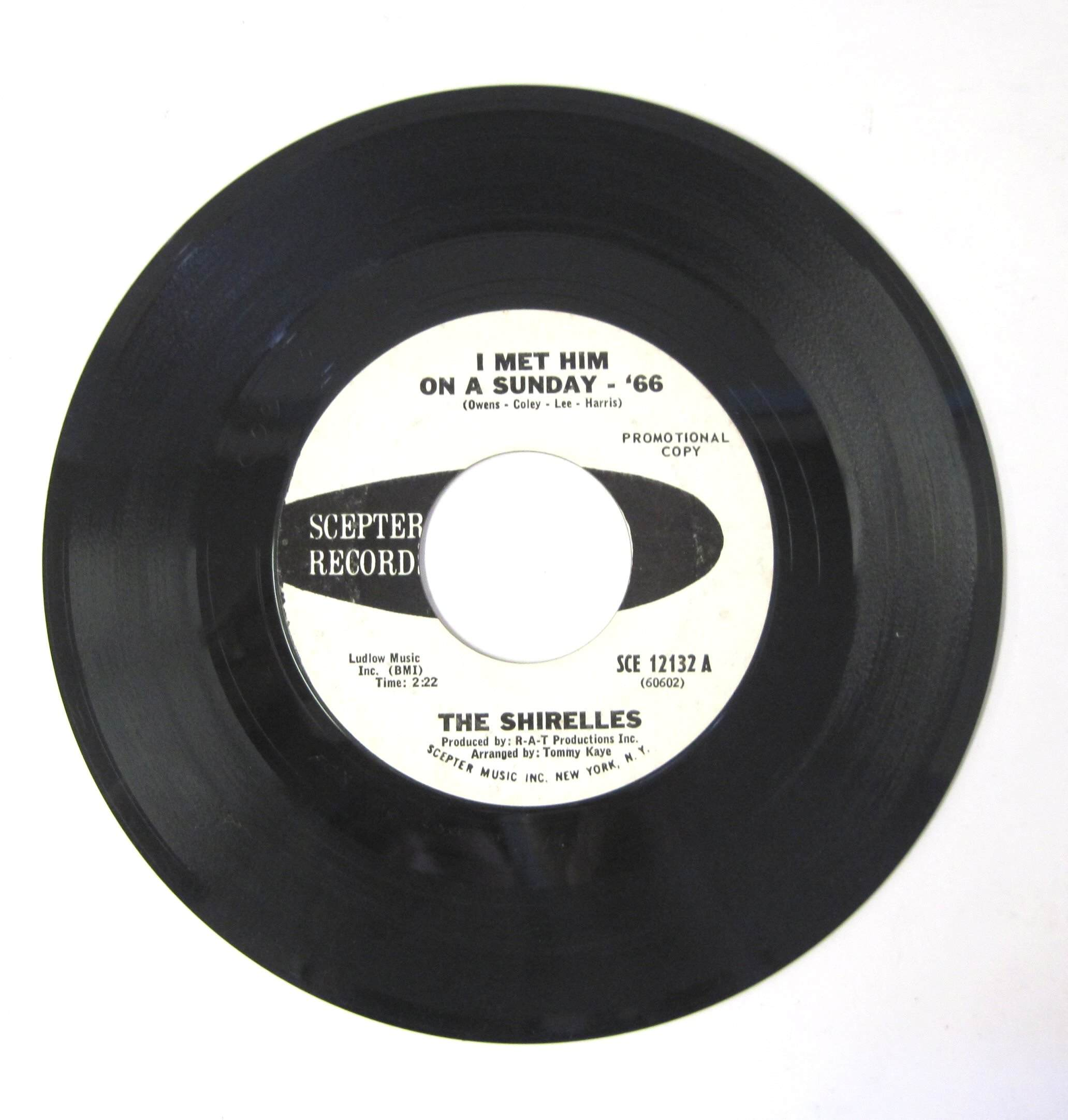
- Parent company: Gusto Records
- Founded: 1959
- Founder: Florence Greenberg
- Genre: Pop, soul
- Country of origin: U.S.
- Location: New York City

Scepter Records was an American record company founded in 1959 by Florence Greenberg.

== History ==
Florence Greenberg founded Scepter Records from the $4,000 she received after she sold Tiara Records and the Shirelles to Decca Records. When the Shirelles didn't produce any hits for Decca, they were given back to Greenberg, who promptly signed them.

By 1961, Greenberg had launched a subsidiary, Wand Records. Through the two labels, she launched the careers of not only the Shirelles, but Dionne Warwick, Chuck Jackson, The Kingsmen, B.J. Thomas, Joey Dee, Maxine Brown, The Esquires, Tommy Hunt, The Guess Who, Tammi Terrell, The Independents and B. T. Express, and gave The Isley Brothers their famous hit "Twist and Shout", which was later covered by The Beatles. Other Scepter/Wand subsidiary labels included Bamboo, Bunky, Cap City, Captain, Citation, Garrison, Jet Stream, Lanie, Madtad, Marlu, Mosaic, Pepper, Realm, Roadshow, Rock'N, Sonday, Spokane, Stop, Tiffany, Toddlin' Town, and Treat.

In 1965, Scepter moved its offices to 254 West 54th Street in Manhattan, New York City (a building now famous for housing the legendary Studio 54 disco). The building included warehouse space and its own recording studio. Though few albums of note were recorded at Scepter Studios, one was the influential experimental rock album The Velvet Underground & Nico, much of which was recorded there in April 1966 by engineer John Lakata under the supervision of Andy Warhol and Norman Dolph. The album was ranked number 13 on Rolling Stone's list of the "500 Greatest Albums of All Time" in 2003, it was re-positioned to number 23 on the updated list. In 2006, it was inducted into the National Recording Registry by the Library of Congress for being "culturally, historically, or aesthetically significant".

Scepter was one of the earliest record labels to release 12-inch singles intended for the nascent disco market. During this revival of the label during the disco era in the 1970s, the label featured LTG Exchange, South Shore Commission, Ultra High Frequency, General Crook, Southside Movement, Armada Orchestra, and Bobby Moore.

The label worked with several music industry notables of the period. Marvin Schlachter joined Scepter as a partner. In 1960, he became overall vice president and later sold his interest in the label in 1969. Schlachter then ran several other major labels before opening up Prelude Records in 1977. Scepter's main 1960s producer, Luther Dixon, was unparalleled in his field as a songwriter for years. It was also at Scepter that Burt Bacharach came into prominence as a writer and producer. Mel Cheren joined in 1970 as head of production, and together with the vice president for sales Ed Kushins launched West End Records in 1976. Cheren worked with Tom Moulton to create some of the first disco remixes on Scepter's early 12 inch discs in 1975. Maye (Hampton) James-Holler, who began her career as singer Mary Wells's assistant., began at Scepter in 1970, as an assistant in promotion and sales. She was promoted to National Director of R & B in March 1974, and Scepter added artist relations to her duties later that year. James-Holler would go on to a long career in the industry, helping to break Hip Hop as Assistant Program Director and Music Director at WBLS, where she convinced DJ Frankie Crocker to hire Mr. Magic to take his popular community radio show on WHBI to the much larger commercial station WBLS.

Greenberg decided to retire from the business in 1976 and sold her record labels to Springboard International. When Springboard went bankrupt, Gusto Records acquired the catalog. Dionne Warwick arranged to buy her own masters, and the Kingsmen won control of its masters via a highly publicized lawsuit.

In March 2011, the musical Baby It's You! which told the story of Greenberg and the development of Scepter Records, premiered on Broadway to lukewarm-to-poor reviews.

== Roster ==
- Maxine Brown
- B. T. Express
- Joey Dee
- The Esquires (Bunky)
- Great Bear
- The Guess Who (Chad Allan & The Expressions)
- Roy Head
- Tommy Hunt
- Jimmie Raye
- The Independents
- The Isley Brothers
- Chuck Jackson
- The Kingsmen
- Loretta Long
- LTG Exchange
- Merrilee Rush
- The Shirelles
- South Shore Commission
- Tammi Terrell
- B. J. Thomas
- Ultra High Frequency
- Dionne Warwick
- The Rocky Fellers
- Beverly Bremers
- Cooker

== See also ==
- List of record labels
