= Greatest Hits (Maureen McGovern album) =

Greatest hits album by Maureen McGovern
- Released: August 21, 1990
- Genre: Pop, standards
- Length: 31:37
- Label: Curb
- Producer: Mike Curb, Michael Lloyd

Maureen McGovern chronology
Naughty Baby (1989)	Greatest Hits (1990)	Baby I'm Yours (1992)

Professional ratings
Review scores
Source	Rating
AllMusic	4/5 stars

Greatest Hits is the first collection of Maureen McGovern's previously recorded material. The album is a re-package of McGovern's 1979 self-titled album with the song order re-arranged and with the substitution of "The Morning After" in place of "Life's A Long Way to Run." The album cover uses the picture from the front cover of the 1979 self-titled album. The album omits two of her best received movie theme songs, "We May Never Love Like This Again" and "We Could Have It All" as well as other Adult Contemporary hits from McGovern's first three albums.

== Track listing ==
No.	Title	Writer(s)	Length
1.	"The Morning After" (Song from The Poseidon Adventure)	Al Kasha, Joel Hirschhorn	2:19
2.	"Different Worlds" (Theme from the TV series Angie)	Norman Gimbel, Charles Fox	2:14
3.	"Very Special Love"	Michael Lloyd	4:13
4.	"I'm Happy Just to Dance With You"	John Lennon, Paul McCartney	3:01
5.	"Carolina Moon"	Michael Lloyd	2:44
6.	"Yes, I'm Ready"	Barbara Mason	3:46
7.	"He's a Rebel"	Gene Pitney	2:28
8.	"Can't Take My Eyes off You"	Bob Gaudio, Bob Crewe	3:37
9.	"In Too Deep"	Michael Lloyd, Al Kasha, Joel Hirschhorn	3:53
10.	"Can You Read My Mind" (Love theme from Superman)	John Williams, Leslie Bricusse	3:22

== Album credits ==
- Tracks 2–10 produced by: Michael Lloyd
- Executive producer: Mike Curb
- Art direction/design: Neuman, Walker & Associates
- Album coordination: Marguerite Luciani
