= 20th Century Masters – The Millennium Collection: The Best of Maureen McGovern =

Greatest hits album by Maureen McGovern
- Released: May 24, 2005
- Genre: Pop, standards, movie themes
- Length: 36:08
- Label: Mercury
- Producer: Gordon Pogoda, Bill Levenson

Maureen McGovern chronology
Out of This World (2003)	20th Century Masters – The Millennium Collection: The Best of Maureen McGovern (2005)	A Long and Winding Road (2008)

20th Century Masters – The Millennium Collection: The Best of Maureen McGovern is a 12-track collection of songs that Maureen McGovern recorded for 20th Century Records, which was the first label that she signed with. All seven of her singles for the label are featured on this CD, two of which make their first appearance on an album ("Even Better Than I Know Myself" and "Love Songs Are Getting Harder to Sing"). Inside the album cover are McGovern's discography for 20th Century and a biographical essay written by Gordon Pogoda. Eleven of the 12 songs make their compact disc debut on this release and had only been previously available on LPs and 45s. Three of McGovern's movie themes ("The Morning After," "We May Never Love Like This Again," and "Nice to Be Around") are featured on the CD, while a fourth movie theme that McGovern recorded for 20th Century Records, "Wherever Love Takes Me," can be found in the CD format on the Elmer Bernstein soundtrack to Gold. This CD covers McGovern's recording period from 1972 to 1975 and includes seven songs from her 1974 LP Nice to Be Around.

== Track listing ==
No.	Title	Writer(s)	Length
1.	"The Morning After" (Theme from The Poseidon Adventure)	Al Kasha, Joel Hirschhorn	2:20
2.	"Where Did We Go Wrong"	Ron Miller, Tom Baird	3:22
3.	"We May Never Love Like This Again" (Theme from The Towering Inferno)	Al Kasha, Joel Hirschhorn	2:09
4.	"Everybody Wants to Call You Sweetheart"	Randy Edelman	2:50
5.	"Nice to Be Around" (from the film Cinderella Liberty)	John Williams, Paul Williams	2:27
6.	"Put a Little Love Away"	Dennis Lambert, Brian Potter	3:00
7.	"Love Songs Are Getting Harder to Sing"	Annette Tucker, Hod David, James Serrett, Arthur Hamilton	2:54
8.	"Even Better Than I Know Myself"	Paul Williams	3:14
9.	"Give Me a Reason to Be Gone"	Marie Cain	2:45
10.	"Love Knots"	Maureen McGovern, Ron Barron	3:30
11.	"I Won't Last a Day Without You"	Paul Williams, Roger Nichols	3:52
12.	"Like a Sunday Morning"	Joel Diamond, A. Kenneth	3:10

== Critical reception ==
Professional ratings
Review scores
Source	Rating
Allmusic	4/5 stars

This album received four out of five stars from James Christopher Monger of Allmusic. In his review, Monger states that several of the songs featured on the collection are able to showcase McGovern's lovely four-octave range and that the collection is definitely worth looking into. However, he also mentions the fact that McGovern also added "cabaret and classical offerings" to her repertoire and that all the songs on this collection "remain firmly rooted in the pop idiom".

== Album credits ==
- Compilation Produced by: Gordon Pogoda and Bill Levenson
- Mastered by: Ellen Fitton at Universal Mastering Studios East
- Essay by: Gordon Pogoda
- Art direction: Vartan
- Design: Add To The Noise
- Photo coordination: Ryan Null
- Photos: Michael Ochs Archives
- Production manager: Adam Abrams
- Licensing: Jenny Shapiro
- Marketing: Ashley Culp
