= Maureen McGovern (album) =

Studio album by Maureen McGovern
- Released: 1979
- Genre: Pop
- Label: Warner Bros./Curb
- Producer: Michael Lloyd

Maureen McGovern chronology
Academy Award Performance (1975)	Maureen McGovern (1979)	Another Woman in Love (1987)

Maureen McGovern is Maureen McGovern's fourth studio album (and her first in four years), released in 1979 on Curb Records. It reached #162 on the Billboard Hot 200 list of popular albums.

This album contains McGovern's movie theme ("Can You Read My Mind," the love theme from the 1978 film Superman) and "Different Worlds," the theme from the TV series Angie, which peaked at #1 for two weeks on the Adult Contemporary chart and #18 on the Billboard Hot 100 chart in 1979. It shows a new image that McGovern created for herself; she had her long blonde hair cut short and dyed it brown (she would change her image a few more times over the years, particularly during the 1980s). It was also McGovern's last album to concentrate on pop music and movie themes, as she would soon quit this work to begin a career on Broadway; she returned to the music industry a few years later as a singer of standards and showtunes.

Cover versions include Frankie Valli's "Can't Take My Eyes Off You," the Beatles' "I'm Happy Just to Dance with You," the Crystals' hit "He's a Rebel" (written by Gene Pitney), Barbara Mason's "Yes, I'm Ready", and the standard "Carolina Moon". (In 1980, McGovern continued to record for Curb Records, releasing the singles "We Could Have It All," which reached #16 on the U.S. AC charts and #6 on the Canadian AC charts, as well as "Bottom Line," but no follow-up album on Curb was ever released.)

In 1990, Curb Records released this album on CD, but replaced the fan favorite album cut "Life's a Long Way To Run" with the hit "The Morning After" and re-titled the CD Greatest Hits.

== Track listing ==
Side one
No.	Title	Writer(s)	Length
1.	"Can You Read My Mind" (Love theme from Superman)	John Williams, Leslie Bricusse	3:22
2.	"In Too Deep"	Michael Lloyd, Al Kasha, Joel Hirschhorn	3:53
3.	"Very Special Love"	Michael Lloyd	4:13
4.	"Can't Take My Eyes Off You"	Bob Gaudio, Bob Crewe	3:37
5.	"Carolina Moon"	adaptation by Michael Lloyd	2:44

Side two
No.	Title	Writer(s)	Length
1.	"I'm Happy Just to Dance With You"	John Lennon, Paul McCartney	3:01
2.	"Different Worlds" (Theme from the Paramount TV series "Angie")	Norman Gimbel, Charles Fox	2:14
3.	"Life's a Long Way to Run"	Alan David, Lionel Martin	3:57
4.	"He's a Rebel"	Gene Pitney	2:28
5.	"Yes, I'm Ready"	Barbara Mason	3:46

== Album credits ==
- Produced and engineered by: Michael Lloyd
- Arranged by: John D'Andrea
- Tracks engineered by: Humberto Gatica and Michael Lloyd
- Second engineer: Jim Crosby
- Mastered: Bob McCloud at Artisan
- Musician contracting: Shaun Harris
- Background vocals: The Pearl Divers
- Management: Marcia Day, Day 5 Productions
- Art direction: Peter Whorf
- Design: Brad Kanawyer
- Photography: Luis Lizarraga

== Charts ==
Year	Chart	Position
1979	The Billboard 200	162
