= Golden Globe Award for Best Original Song =

Hollywood Foreign Press Association award

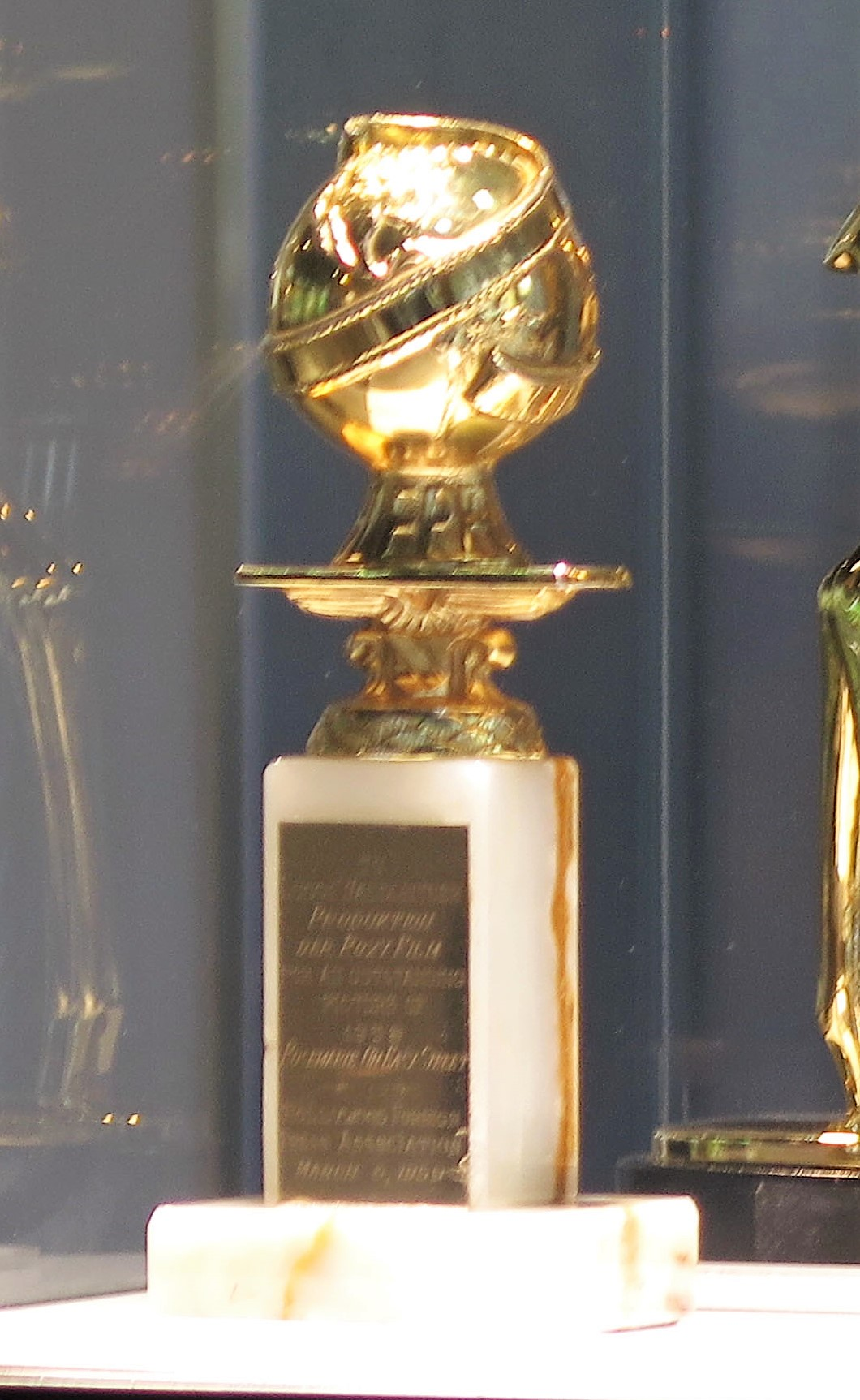
- Golden Globe
- Awarded for: The songwriter of the best movie's song
- Location: United States
- Presented by: Dick Clark Productions
- Currently held by: Ejae, Mark Sonnenblick, Ido, 24 and Teddy for "Golden" from KPop Demon Hunters 2025
- Website: goldenglobes.com

The Golden Globe Award for Best Original Song is a Golden Globe Award that was awarded for the first time in 1962 and has been awarded annually from 1965 to 2023 by the Hollywood Foreign Press Association. The award is presented to the songwriters of a song written specifically for a motion picture. The performers of the song are not credited, unless they also have a writing or co-writing credit.

== Winners and nominees ==
=== 1960s ===
Year	Film	Song	Nominees
1961 (19th)	Town Without Pity	"Town Without Pity"	Dimitri Tiomkin & Ned Washington
1964 (22nd)	Circus World	"Circus World"	Dimitri Tiomkin & Ned Washington
1964 (22nd)	Dear Heart	"Dear Heart"	Henry Mancini, Jay Livingston & Ray Evans
1964 (22nd)	From Russia with Love	"From Russia with Love"	John Barry & Lionel Bart
1964 (22nd)	Sunday in New York	"Sunday in New York"	Peter Nero & Carroll Coates
1964 (22nd)	Where Love Has Gone	"Where Love Has Gone"	Jimmy Van Heusen & Sammy Cahn
1965 (23rd)	The Yellow Rolls-Royce	"Forget Domani"	Riz Ortolani & Norman Newell
1965 (23rd)	Cat Ballou	"Ballad of Cat Ballou"	Jerry Livingston & Mack David
1965 (23rd)	The Great Race	"The Sweetheart Tree"	Henry Mancini & Johnny Mercer
1965 (23rd)	The Sandpiper	"The Shadow of Your Smile"	Johnny Mandel & Paul Francis Webster
1965 (23rd)	That Funny Feeling	"That Funny Feeling"	Bobby Darin
1966 (24th)	A Man Could Get Killed	"Strangers in the Night"	Bert Kaempfert, Charles Singleton & Eddie Snyder
1966 (24th)	Alfie	"Alfie"	Burt Bacharach & Hal David
1966 (24th)	Born Free	"Born Free"	John Barry & Don Black
1966 (24th)	Georgy Girl	"Georgy Girl"	Tom Springfield & Jim Dale
1966 (24th)	A Man and a Woman (Un homme et une femme)	"A Man and a Woman"	Francis Lai & Pierre Barouh
1967 (25th)	Camelot	"If Ever I Would Leave You"	Richard Harris, Frederick Loewe & Alan Jay Lerner
1967 (25th)	Doctor Dolittle	"Talk to the Animals"	Leslie Bricusse
1967 (25th)	Live for Life (Vivre pour vivre)	"Circles in the Water (Des ronds dans l'eau)"	Francis Lai & Norman Gimbel
1967 (25th)	Ski Fever	"Please Don't Gamble with Love"	Jerry Styner & Guy Hemric
1967 (25th)	Thoroughly Modern Millie	"Thoroughly Modern Millie"	Jimmy Van Heusen & Sammy Cahn
1968 (26th)	The Thomas Crown Affair	"The Windmills of Your Mind"	Noel Harrison, Michel Legrand, Alan and Marilyn Bergman
1968 (26th)	Buona Sera, Mrs. Campbell	"Buona Sera, Mrs. Campbell"	Riz Ortolani & Melvin Frank
1968 (26th)	Chitty Chitty Bang Bang	"Chitty Chitty Bang Bang"	Richard M. Sherman & Robert B. Sherman
1968 (26th)	Funny Girl	"Funny Girl"	Jule Styne & Bob Merrill
1968 (26th)	Star!	"Star"	Jimmy Van Heusen & Sammy Cahn
1969 (27th)	The Prime of Miss Jean Brodie	"Jean"	Rod McKuen
1969 (27th)	Butch Cassidy and the Sundance Kid	"Raindrops Keep Falling on My Head"	Burt Bacharach & Hal David
1969 (27th)	Cactus Flower	"The Time for Love Is Anytime"	Quincy Jones & Cynthia Weil
1969 (27th)	Goodbye, Columbus	"Goodbye, Columbus"	Jim Yester
1969 (27th)	The Happy Ending	"What Are You Doing the Rest of Your Life?"	Michel Legrand, Alan and Marilyn Bergman
1969 (27th)	The Secret of Santa Vittoria	"Stay"	Ernest Goldner & Norman Gimbel
1969 (27th)	True Grit	"True Grit"	Elmer Bernstein & Don Black

=== 1970s ===
Year	Film	Song	Nominees
1970 (28th)	Darling Lili	"Whistling Away the Dark"	Henry Mancini & Johnny Mercer
1970 (28th)	Little Fauss and Big Halsy	"Ballad of Little Fauss and Big Halsey"	Carl Perkins
1970 (28th)	Madron	"Till Love Touches Your Life"	Riz Ortolani & Arthur Hamilton
1970 (28th)	Pieces of Dreams	"Pieces of Dreams"	Marvin Hamlisch, Alan and Marilyn Bergman
1970 (28th)	Scrooge	"Thank You Very Much"	Leslie Bricusse
1971 (29th)	Kotch	"Life Is What You Make It"	Marvin Hamlisch & Johnny Mercer
1971 (29th)	The African Elephant	"Rain Falls Anywhere It Wants To"	Laurence Rosenthal, Alan and Marilyn Bergman
1971 (29th)	Honky	"Something More"	Quincy Jones & Bradford Craig
1971 (29th)	The Raging Moon	"Long Ago Tomorrow"	Burt Bacharach & Hal David
1971 (29th)	Shaft	"Theme from Shaft"	Isaac Hayes
1972 (30th)	Ben	"Ben"	Walter Scharf & Don Black
1972 (30th)	Butterflies Are Free	"Carry Me"	Bob Alcivar & Randy McNeill
1972 (30th)	Cabaret	"Mein Herr"	John Kander & Fred Ebb
1972 (30th)	Cabaret	"Money, Money"	Kander & Ebb
1972 (30th)	Deliverance	"Dueling Banjos"	Arthur "Guitar Boogie" Smith
1972 (30th)	The Life and Times of Judge Roy Bean	"Marmalade, Molasses and Honey"	Maurice Jarre, Alan and Marilyn Bergman
1972 (30th)	Molly and Lawless John	"Take Me Home"	Johnny Mandel, Alan and Marilyn Bergman
1972 (30th)	The Poseidon Adventure	"The Morning After"	Al Kasha & Joel Hirschhorn
1973 (31st)	The Way We Were	"The Way We Were"	Marvin Hamlisch, Alan and Marilyn Bergman
1973 (31st)	Breezy	"Breezy's Song"	Michel Legrand, Alan and Marilyn Bergman
1973 (31st)	Jonathan Livingston Seagull	"Lonely Looking Sky"	Neil Diamond
1973 (31st)	Kazablan	"Rosa Rosa"	Dov Seltzer & Haim Hefer
1973 (31st)	Oklahoma Crude	"Send a Little Love My Way"	Henry Mancini & Hal David
1973 (31st)	A Touch of Class	"All That Love Went to Waste"	George Barrie & Sammy Cahn
1974 (32nd)	Benji	"I Feel Love"	Euel Box & Betty Box
1974 (32nd)	Claudine	"On and On"	Curtis Mayfield
1974 (32nd)	The Dove	"Sail the Summer Winds"	John Barry & Don Blackstone
1974 (32nd)	The Little Prince	"I Never Met a Rose"	Frederick Loewe & Alan Jay Lerner
1974 (32nd)	The Towering Inferno	"We May Never Love Like This Again"	Al Kasha & Joel Hirschhorn
1975 (33rd)	Nashville	"I'm Easy"	Keith Carradine
1975 (33rd)	Funny Lady	"How Lucky Can You Get"	John Kander & Fred Ebb
1975 (33rd)	Paper Tiger	"My Little Friend"	Roy Budd & Sammy Cahn
1975 (33rd)	Whiffs	"Now That We're in Love"	George Barrie & Cahn
1975 (33rd)	The Other Side of the Mountain	"Richard's Window"	Charles Fox & Norman Gimbel
1976 (34th)	A Star Is Born	"Evergreen"	Barbra Streisand & Paul Williams
1976 (34th)	Bugsy Malone	"Bugsy Malone"	Williams
1976 (34th)	Car Wash	"Car Wash"	Norman Whitfield
1976 (34th)	Freaky Friday	"I'd Like to Be You for a Day"	Al Kasha & Joel Hirschhorn
1976 (34th)	From Noon Till Three	"Hello and Goodbye"	Elmer Bernstein, Alan and Marilyn Bergman
1976 (34th)	Pipe Dreams	"So Sad the Song"	Michael Masser & Gerry Goffin
1977 (35th)	You Light Up My Life	"You Light Up My Life"	Joseph Brooks
1977 (35th)	The Deep	"Down Deep Inside"	John Barry & Donna Summer
1977 (35th)	New York, New York	"New York, New York"	Kander and Ebb
1977 (35th)	Saturday Night Fever	"How Deep Is Your Love"	The Bee Gees
1977 (35th)	The Spy Who Loved Me	"Nobody Does It Better"	Marvin Hamlisch & Carole Bayer Sager
1978 (36th)	Thank God It's Friday	"Last Dance"	Paul Jabara
1978 (36th)	Foul Play	"Ready to Take a Chance Again"	Charles Fox & Norman Gimbel
1978 (36th)	Grease	"Grease"	Barry Gibb
1978 (36th)	Grease	"You're the One That I Want"	John Farrar
1978 (36th)	Same Time, Next Year	"The Last Time I Felt Like This"	Marvin Hamlisch, Alan and Marilyn Bergman
1979 (37th)	The Rose	"The Rose"	Amanda McBroom
1979 (37th)	Ice Castles	"Through the Eyes of Love"	Marvin Hamlisch & Carole Bayer Sager
1979 (37th)	The Main Event	"The Main Event"	Paul Jabara & Bruce Roberts
1979 (37th)	The Muppet Movie	"Rainbow Connection"	Paul Williams & Kenny Ascher
1979 (37th)	Starting Over	"Better Than Ever"	Marvin Hamlisch & Carole Bayer Sager

=== 1980s ===
Year	Film	Song	Nominees
1980 (38th)	Fame	"Fame"	Michael Gore & Dean Pitchford
1980 (38th)	American Gigolo	"Call Me"	Giorgio Moroder & Debbie Harry
1980 (38th)	Falling in Love Again	"Yesterday's Dreams"	Michel Legrand & Carol Connors
1980 (38th)	The Jazz Singer	"Love on the Rocks"	Neil Diamond
1980 (38th)	9 to 5	"9 to 5"	Dolly Parton
1981 (39th)	Arthur	"Arthur's Theme (Best That You Can Do)"	Peter Allen, Burt Bacharach, Christopher Cross & Carole Bayer Sager
1981 (39th)	Butterfly	"It's Wrong for Me to Love You"	Henry Mancini & Carol Connors
1981 (39th)	Endless Love	"Endless Love"	Lionel Richie
1981 (39th)	For Your Eyes Only	"For Your Eyes Only"	Bill Conti & Mick Leeson
1981 (39th)	Ragtime	"One More Hour"	Randy Newman
1982 (40th)	An Officer and a Gentleman	"Up Where We Belong"	Jack Nitzsche, Buffy Sainte-Marie & Will Jennings
1982 (40th)	Cat People	"Cat People (Putting Out Fire)"	David Bowie & Giorgio Moroder
1982 (40th)	Making Love	"Making Love"	Burt Bacharach, Bruce Roberts & Carole Bayer Sager
1982 (40th)	Rocky III	"Eye of the Tiger"	Jim Peterik & Frankie Sullivan
1982 (40th)	Yes, Giorgio	"If We Were in Love"	John Williams, Alan and Marilyn Bergman
1983 (41st)	Flashdance	"Flashdance... What a Feeling"	Giorgio Moroder, Irene Cara & Keith Forsey
1983 (41st)	Flashdance	"Maniac"	Michael Sembello
1983 (41st)	Staying Alive	"Far from Over"	Frank Stallone & Vince DiCola
1983 (41st)	Tender Mercies	"Over You"	Austin Roberts & Bobby Hart
1983 (41st)	Yentl	"The Way He Makes Me Feel"	Michel Legrand, Alan and Marilyn Bergman
1984 (42nd)	The Woman in Red	"I Just Called to Say I Love You"	Stevie Wonder
1984 (42nd)	Against All Odds	"Against All Odds (Take a Look at Me Now)"	Phil Collins
1984 (42nd)	Footloose	"Footloose"	Kenny Loggins & Dean Pitchford
1984 (42nd)	Ghostbusters	"Ghostbusters"	Ray Parker Jr.
1984 (42nd)	Give My Regards to Broad Street	"No More Lonely Nights"	Paul McCartney
1984 (42nd)	Purple Rain	"When Doves Cry"	Prince
1985 (43rd)	White Nights	"Say You, Say Me"	Lionel Richie
1985 (43rd)	Back to the Future	"The Power of Love"	Huey Lewis and the News
1985 (43rd)	The Last Dragon	"Rhythm of the Night"	Diane Warren
1985 (43rd)	Mad Max Beyond Thunderdome	"We Don't Need Another Hero"	Terry Britten & Graham Lyle
1985 (43rd)	A View to a Kill	"A View to a Kill"	Duran Duran
1986 (44th)	Top Gun	"Take My Breath Away"	Giorgio Moroder & Tom Whitlock
1986 (44th)	An American Tail	"Somewhere Out There"	James Horner, Barry Mann & Cynthia Weil
1986 (44th)	The Karate Kid Part II	"Glory of Love"	David Foster, Peter Cetera & Diane Nini
1986 (44th)	Running Scared	"Sweet Freedom"	Rod Temperton
1986 (44th)	That's Life!	"Life in a Looking Glass"	Henry Mancini & Leslie Bricusse
1986 (44th)	Tough Guys	"They Don't Make Them Like They Used To"	Burt Bacharach & Carole Bayer Sager
1987 (45th)	Dirty Dancing	"(I've Had) The Time of My Life"	John DeNicola, Donald Markowitz & Franke Previte
1987 (45th)	Beverly Hills Cop II	"Shakedown"	Harold Faltermeyer, Keith Forsey & Bob Seger
1987 (45th)	Mannequin	"Nothing's Gonna Stop Us Now"	Diane Warren & Albert Hammond
1987 (45th)	The Secret of My Succe$s	"The Secret of My Success"	David Foster, Michael Landau, Jack Blades & Tom Keane
1987 (45th)	Who's That Girl	"Who's That Girl"	Madonna & Patrick Leonard
1988 (46th)	Working Girl	"Let the River Run"	Carly Simon
1988 (46th)	Buster	"Two Hearts"	Phil Collins & Lamont Dozier
1988 (46th)	Bull Durham	"A Woman Loves a Man"	Charlie Kaufman & Dan Hartman
1988 (46th)	Cocktail	"Kokomo"	The Beach Boys
1988 (46th)	Oliver & Company	"Why Should I Worry?"	Charlie Kaufman & Dan Hartman
1988 (46th)	Twins	"Twins"	Mark Isham
1989 (47th)	The Little Mermaid	"Under the Sea"	Alan Menken & Howard Ashman
1989 (47th)	Chances Are	"After All"	Tom Snow & Dean Pitchford
1989 (47th)	The Little Mermaid	"Kiss the Girl"	Alan Menken & Howard Ashman
1989 (47th)	Parenthood	"I Love to See You Smile"	Randy Newman
1989 (47th)	Shirley Valentine	"The Girl Who Used to Be Me"	Marvin Hamlisch, Alan and Marilyn Bergman

=== 1990s ===
Year	Film	Song	Nominees
1990 (48th)	Young Guns II	"Blaze of Glory"	Jon Bon Jovi
1990 (48th)	Dick Tracy	"Sooner or Later"	Stephen Sondheim
1990 (48th)	Dick Tracy	"What Can You Lose?"	Stephen Sondheim
1990 (48th)	The Godfather Part III	"Promise Me You'll Remember"	Carmine Coppola & John Bettis
1990 (48th)	Postcards from the Edge	"I'm Checkin' Out"	Shel Silverstein
1991 (49th)	Beauty and the Beast	"Beauty and the Beast"	Alan Menken & Howard Ashman
1991 (49th)	An American Tail: Fievel Goes West	"Dreams to Dream"	James Horner & Will Jennings
1991 (49th)	Beauty and the Beast	"Be Our Guest"	Alan Menken & Howard Ashman
1991 (49th)	Robin Hood: Prince of Thieves	"(Everything I Do) I Do It for You"	Michael Kamen, Bryan Adams & Robert John "Mutt" Lange
1991 (49th)	Rush	"Tears in Heaven"	Eric Clapton & Will Jennings
1992 (50th)	Aladdin	"A Whole New World"	Alan Menken & Tim Rice
1992 (50th)	Aladdin	"Friend Like Me"	Alan Menken & Howard Ashman
1992 (50th)	Aladdin	"Prince Ali"	Alan Menken, Howard Ashman & Tim Rice
1992 (50th)	A League of Their Own	"This Used to Be My Playground"	Madonna & Shep Pettibone
1992 (50th)	The Mambo Kings	"Beautiful Maria of My Soul"	Robert Kraft & Arne Glimcher
1993 (51st)	Philadelphia	"Streets of Philadelphia"	Bruce Springsteen
1993 (51st)	Beethoven's 2nd	"The Day I Fall in Love"	James Ingram, Clif Magness & Carole Bayer Sager
1993 (51st)	Faraway, So Close	"Stay (Faraway, So Close!)"	U2
1993 (51st)	In the Name of the Father	"You Made Me the Thief of Your Heart"	Bono, Gavin Friday & Maurice Seezer
1993 (51st)	Poetic Justice	"Again"	Janet Jackson, Jimmy Jam and Terry Lewis
1994 (52nd)	The Lion King	"Can You Feel the Love Tonight"	Elton John & Tim Rice
1994 (52nd)	Color of Night	"The Color of the Night"	Lauren Christy, Jud J. Friedman & Dominic Frontiere
1994 (52nd)	Junior	"Look What Love Has Done"	Patty Smyth, James Ingram, & Carole Bayer Sager
1994 (52nd)	The Lion King	"Circle of Life"	Elton John & Tim Rice
1994 (52nd)	The Swan Princess	"Far Longer than Forever"	Lex de Azevedo & David Zippel
1994 (52nd)	With Honors	"I'll Remember"	Madonna, Patrick Leonard & Richard Page
1995 (53rd)	Pocahontas	"Colors of the Wind"	Alan Menken & Stephen Schwartz
1995 (53rd)	Batman Forever	"Hold Me, Thrill Me, Kiss Me, Kill Me"	U2
1995 (53rd)	Don Juan DeMarco	"Have You Ever Really Loved a Woman?"	Bryan Adams, Michael Kamen, & Robert John "Mutt" Lange
1995 (53rd)	Sabrina	"Moonlight"	John Williams, Alan and Marilyn Bergman
1995 (53rd)	Toy Story	"You've Got a Friend in Me"	Randy Newman
1996 (54th)	Evita	"You Must Love Me"	Andrew Lloyd Webber & Tim Rice
1996 (54th)	The Mirror Has Two Faces	"I Finally Found Someone"	Marvin Hamlisch, Barbra Streisand, Bryan Adams & Robert John "Mutt" Lange
1996 (54th)	One Fine Day	"For the First Time"	James Newton Howard, Jud J. Friedman & Allan Rich
1996 (54th)	That Thing You Do!	"That Thing You Do"	Adam Schlesinger
1996 (54th)	Up Close and Personal	"Because You Loved Me"	Diane Warren
1997 (55th)	Titanic	"My Heart Will Go On"	James Horner & Will Jennings
1997 (55th)	Anastasia	"Journey to the Past"	Stephen Flaherty & Lynn Ahrens
1997 (55th)	Anastasia	"Once Upon a December"	Stephen Flaherty & Lynn Ahrens
1997 (55th)	Hercules	"Go the Distance"	Alan Menken & David Zippel
1997 (55th)	Tomorrow Never Dies	"Tomorrow Never Dies"	Sheryl Crow & Mitchell Froom
1998 (56th)	Quest for Camelot	"The Prayer"	David Foster, Carole Bayer Sager, Tony Renis & Alberto Testa
1998 (56th)	City of Angels	"Uninvited"	Alanis Morissette
1998 (56th)	The Mighty	"The Mighty"	Sting
1998 (56th)	Mulan	"Reflection"	Matthew Wilder & David Zippel
1998 (56th)	The Prince of Egypt	"When You Believe"	Stephen Schwartz & Kenneth Edmonds
1998 (56th)	Still Crazy	"The Flame Still Burns"	Chris Difford, Marti Frederiksen and Mick Jones
1999 (57th)	Tarzan	"You'll Be in My Heart"	Phil Collins
1999 (57th)	Austin Powers: The Spy Who Shagged Me	"Beautiful Stranger"	Madonna & William Wainwright
1999 (57th)	Anna and the King	"How Can I Not Love You"	Joy Enriquez
1999 (57th)	Magnolia	"Save Me"	Aimee Mann
1999 (57th)	Toy Story 2	"When She Loved Me"	Randy Newman

=== 2000s ===
Year	Film	Song	Nominees
2000 (58th)	Wonder Boys	"Things Have Changed"	Bob Dylan
2000 (58th)	Dancer in the Dark	"I've Seen It All"	Björk, Lars von Trier & Sigurjón Sigurðsson
2000 (58th)	The Emperor's New Groove	"My Funny Friend and Me"	Sting
2000 (58th)	Frequency	"When You Come Back to Me Again"	Garth Brooks & Jenny Yates
2000 (58th)	Miss Congeniality	"One in a Million"	Bosson
2001 (59th)	Kate & Leopold	"Until..."	Sting
2001 (59th)	Moulin Rouge!	"Come What May"	David Baerwald
2001 (59th)	Pearl Harbor	"There You'll Be"	Diane Warren
2001 (59th)	The Lord of the Rings: The Fellowship of the Ring	"May It Be"	Enya & Roma Ryan
2001 (59th)	Vanilla Sky	"Vanilla Sky"	Paul McCartney
2002 (60th)	Gangs of New York	"The Hands That Built America"	Bono, Adam Clayton, The Edge & Larry Mullen, Jr.
2002 (60th)	8 Mile	"Lose Yourself"	Eminem, Jeff Bass & Luis Resto
2002 (60th)	Die Another Day	"Die Another Day"	Madonna & Mirwais Ahmadzaï
2002 (60th)	Spirit: Stallion of the Cimarron	"Here I Am"	Bryan Adams, Hans Zimmer, & Gretchen Peters
2002 (60th)	The Wild Thornberrys Movie	"Father and Daughter"	Paul Simon
2003 (61st)	The Lord of the Rings: The Return of the King	"Into the West"	Annie Lennox, Howard Shore & Fran Walsh
2003 (61st)	Big Fish	"Man of the Hour"	Eddie Vedder
2003 (61st)	Cold Mountain	"You Will Be My Ain True Love"	Alison Krauss & Sting
2003 (61st)	In America	"Time Enough for Tears"	Gavin Friday & Maurice Seezer
2003 (61st)	Mona Lisa Smile	"The Heart of Every Girl"	Elton John & Bernie Taupin
2004 (62nd)	Alfie	"Old Habits Die Hard"	Mick Jagger & David A. Stewart
2004 (62nd)	Hotel Rwanda	"Million Voices"	Wyclef Jean, Jerry Duplessis & Andrea Guerra
2004 (62nd)	The Phantom of the Opera	"Learn to Be Lonely"	Andrew Lloyd Webber & Charles Hart
2004 (62nd)	The Polar Express	"Believe"	Alan Silvestri & Glen Ballard
2004 (62nd)	Shrek 2	"Accidentally in Love"	Counting Crows
2005 (63rd)	Brokeback Mountain	"A Love That Will Never Grow Old"	Gustavo Santaolalla & Bernie Taupin
2005 (63rd)	Christmas in Love	"Christmas in Love"	Elio Cesari
2005 (63rd)	The Chronicles of Narnia: The Lion, the Witch and the Wardrobe	"Wunderkind"	Alanis Morissette
2005 (63rd)	The Producers	"There's Nothing Like a Show on Broadway"	Mel Brooks
2005 (63rd)	Transamerica	"Travelin' Thru"	Dolly Parton
2006 (64th)	Happy Feet	"Song of the Heart"	Prince
2006 (64th)	Bobby	"Never Gonna Break My Faith"	Bryan Adams, Eliot Kennedy & Andrea Ramada
2006 (64th)	Dreamgirls	"Listen"	Beyoncé, Henry Krieger, Scott Cutler, Anne Preven
2006 (64th)	Home of the Brave	"Try Not to Remember"	Sheryl Crow
2006 (64th)	The Pursuit of Happyness	"A Father's Way"	Seal & Christopher Bruce
2007 (65th)	Into the Wild	"Guaranteed"	Eddie Vedder
2007 (65th)	Enchanted	"That's How You Know"	Alan Menken & Stephen Schwartz
2007 (65th)	Grace Is Gone	"Grace Is Gone"	Clint Eastwood & Carole Bayer Sager
2007 (65th)	Love in the Time of Cholera	"Despedida"	Shakira & Antonio Pinto
2007 (65th)	Walk Hard: The Dewey Cox Story	"Walk Hard"	Marshall Crenshaw, Judd Apatow, Jake Kasdan & John C. Reilly
2008 (66th)	The Wrestler	"The Wrestler"	Bruce Springsteen
2008 (66th)	Bolt	"I Thought I Lost You"	Miley Cyrus & Jeffrey Steele
2008 (66th)	Cadillac Records	"Once in a Lifetime"	Henry Krieger, Scott Cutler, Anne Preven & Beyoncé Knowles
2008 (66th)	Gran Torino	"Gran Torino"	Jamie Cullum, Clint Eastwood, Kyle Eastwood, & Michael Stevens
2008 (66th)	WALL-E	"Down to Earth"	Peter Gabriel & Thomas Newman
2009 (67th)	Crazy Heart	"The Weary Kind"	Ryan Bingham & T Bone Burnett
2009 (67th)	Avatar	"I See You"	Leona Lewis, James Horner & Thaddis Harrell
2009 (67th)	Brothers	"Winter"	U2
2009 (67th)	Everybody's Fine	"(I Want To) Come Home"	Paul McCartney
2009 (67th)	Nine	"Cinema Italiano"	Maury Yeston

=== 2010s ===
Year	Film	Song	Nominees
2010 (68th)	Burlesque	"You Haven't Seen the Last of Me"	Cher and Diane Warren
2010 (68th)	Burlesque	"Bound to You"	Christina Aguilera, Sia & Samuel Dixon
2010 (68th)	The Chronicles of Narnia: The Voyage of the Dawn Treader	"There's a Place for Us"	Carrie Underwood, David Hodges and Hillary Lindsey
2010 (68th)	Country Strong	"Coming Home"	Tom Douglas, Troy Verges & Lindsey
2010 (68th)	Tangled	"I See the Light"	Alan Menken & Glenn Slater
2011 (69th)	W.E.	"Masterpiece"	Madonna, Julie Frost & Jimmy Harry
2011 (69th)	Albert Nobbs	"Lay Your Head Down"	Glenn Close and Brian Byrne
2011 (69th)	Gnomeo and Juliet	"Hello, Hello"	Elton John & Bernie Taupin
2011 (69th)	The Help	"The Living Proof"	Mary J. Blige, Thomas Newman, Harvey Mason, Jr. & Damon Thomas
2011 (69th)	Machine Gun Preacher	"The Keeper"	Chris Cornell
2012 (70th)	Skyfall	"Skyfall"	Adele & Paul Epworth
2012 (70th)	Act of Valor	"For You"	Keith Urban & Monty Powell
2012 (70th)	The Hunger Games	"Safe & Sound"	Taylor Swift, The Civil Wars & T-Bone Burnett
2012 (70th)	Les Misérables	"Suddenly"	Claude-Michel Schönberg, Alain Boublil & Herbert Kretzmer
2012 (70th)	Stand Up Guys	"Not Running Anymore"	Jon Bon Jovi
2013 (71st)	Mandela: Long Walk to Freedom	"Ordinary Love"	U2, Paul Hewson & Brian Burton
2013 (71st)	Frozen	"Let It Go"	Kristen Anderson-Lopez & Robert Lopez
2013 (71st)	The Hunger Games: Catching Fire	"Atlas"	Coldplay
2013 (71st)	Inside Llewyn Davis	"Please Mr. Kennedy"	Justin Timberlake, George Cromarty, Justin Burnett, Joel & Ethan Coen
2013 (71st)	One Chance	"Sweeter than Fiction"	Taylor Swift & Jack Antonoff
2014 (72nd)	Selma	"Glory"	Common feat. John Legend
2014 (72nd)	Annie	"Opportunity"	Greg Kurstin, Sia & Will Gluck
2014 (72nd)	Big Eyes	"Big Eyes"	Lana Del Rey & Dan Heath
2014 (72nd)	The Hunger Games: Mockingjay – Part 1	"Yellow Flicker Beat"	Lorde & Joel Little
2014 (72nd)	Noah	"Mercy Is"	Patti Smith & Lenny Kaye
2015 (73rd)	Spectre	"Writing's on the Wall"	Sam Smith & Jimmy Napes
2015 (73rd)	Fifty Shades of Grey	"Love Me like You Do"	Max Martin, Savan Kotecha, Ali Payami, Tove Lo & Ilya Salmanzadeh
2015 (73rd)	Furious 7	"See You Again"	Wiz Khalifa, Charlie Puth, Justin Franks and Andrew Cedar
2015 (73rd)	Love & Mercy	"One Kind of Love"	Brian Wilson & Scott Bennett
2015 (73rd)	Youth	"Simple Song #3"	Sumi Jo and David Lang
2016 (74th)	La La Land	"City of Stars"	Justin Hurwitz, Benj Pasek & Justin Paul
2016 (74th)	Gold	"Gold"	Iggy Pop by Daniel Pemberton, Brian Burton and Stephen Gaghan
2016 (74th)	Moana	"How Far I'll Go"	Lin-Manuel Miranda
2016 (74th)	Sing	"Faith"	Stevie Wonder, Ryan Tedder & Francis Farewell Starlite
2016 (74th)	Trolls	"Can't Stop the Feeling!"	Justin Timberlake, Max Martin and Shellback
2017 (75th)	The Greatest Showman	"This Is Me"	Benj Pasek & Justin Paul
2017 (75th)	Coco	"Remember Me"	Kristen Anderson-Lopez & Robert Lopez
2017 (75th)	Ferdinand	"Home"	Nick Jonas, Nick Monson & Justin Tranter
2017 (75th)	Mudbound	"Mighty River"	Mary J. Blige, Charles Wiggins & Taura Stinson
2017 (75th)	The Star	"The Star"	Mariah Carey and Marc Shaiman
2018 (76th)	A Star Is Born	"Shallow"	Lady Gaga, Mark Ronson, Anthony Rossomando & Andrew Wyatt
2018 (76th)	Black Panther	"All the Stars"	Kendrick Lamar, SZA, Anthony Tiffith, Al Shux and Mark Spears
2018 (76th)	Boy Erased	"Revelation"	Troye Sivan, Jónsi & Brett McLaughlin
2018 (76th)	Dumplin'	"Girl in the Movies"	Dolly Parton & Linda Perry
2018 (76th)	A Private War	"Requiem for a Private War"	Annie Lennox
2019 (77th)	Rocketman	"(I'm Gonna) Love Me Again"	Elton John, Taron Egerton & Bernie Taupin
2019 (77th)	Cats	"Beautiful Ghosts"	Taylor Swift and Andrew Lloyd Webber
2019 (77th)	Frozen 2	"Into the Unknown"	Kristen Anderson-Lopez & Robert Lopez
2019 (77th)	Harriet	"Stand Up"	Cynthia Erivo and Joshuah Brian Campbell
2019 (77th)	The Lion King	"Spirit"	Beyoncé, Ilya Salmanzadeh & Timothy McKenzie

=== 2020s ===
Year	Film	Song	Nominees
2020 (78th)	The Life Ahead	"Io sì (Seen)"	Laura Pausini, Niccolò Agliardi, Pausini & Diane Warren
2020 (78th)	Judas and the Black Messiah	"Fight for You"	H.E.R., Dernst Emile II. & Tiara Thomas
2020 (78th)	One Night in Miami...	"Speak Now"	Leslie Odom Jr. and Sam Ashworth
2020 (78th)	The Trial of the Chicago 7	"Hear My Voice"	Celeste and Daniel Pemberton
2020 (78th)	The United States vs. Billie Holiday	"Tigress & Tweed"	Andra Day, Raphael Saadiq
2021 (79th)	No Time to Die	"No Time to Die"	Billie Eilish & Finneas O'Connell
2021 (79th)	Belfast	"Down to Joy"	Van Morrison
2021 (79th)	Encanto	"Dos Oruguitas"	Lin-Manuel Miranda
2021 (79th)	King Richard	"Be Alive"	Beyoncé & Darius Scott
2021 (79th)	Respect	"Here I Am (Singing My Way Home)"	Jennifer Hudson, Jamie Hartman & Carole King
2022 (80th)	RRR	"Naatu Naatu"	M. M. Keeravani & Chandrabose
2022 (80th)	Black Panther: Wakanda Forever	"Lift Me Up"	Rihanna, Ludwig Göransson, Ryan Coogler & Tems
2022 (80th)	Guillermo del Toro's Pinocchio	"Ciao Papa"	Alexandre Desplat, Roeban Katz & Guillermo del Toro
2022 (80th)	Top Gun: Maverick	"Hold My Hand"	Lady Gaga & Michael Tucker
2022 (80th)	Where the Crawdads Sing	"Carolina"	Taylor Swift
2023 (81st)
2023 (81st)	Barbie	"What Was I Made For?"	Billie Eilish & Finneas O'Connell
2023 (81st)	Barbie	"Dance the Night"	Mark Ronson, Andrew Wyatt, Dua Lipa, and Caroline Ailin
2023 (81st)	Barbie	"I'm Just Ken"	Mark Ronson and Andrew Wyatt
2023 (81st)	Rustin	"Road to Freedom"	Lenny Kravitz
2023 (81st)	She Came to Me	"Addicted to Romance"	Bruce Springsteen
2023 (81st)	The Super Mario Bros. Movie	"Peaches"	Jack Black, Aaron Horvath, Michael Jelenic, Eric Osmond, and John Spiker
2024 (82nd)
2024 (82nd)	Emilia Pérez	"El Mal"	Camille, Clément Ducol & Jacques Audiard
2024 (82nd)	Better Man	"Forbidden Road"	Robbie Williams, Freddy Wexler, and Sacha Skarbek
2024 (82nd)	Challengers	"Compress / Repress"	Trent Reznor, Atticus Ross, and Luca Guadagnino
2024 (82nd)	Emilia Pérez	"Mi camino"	Clément Ducol and Camille
2024 (82nd)	The Last Showgirl	"Beautiful That Way"	Andrew Wyatt, Miley Cyrus, and Lykke Li
2024 (82nd)	The Wild Robot	"Kiss the Sky"	Delacey, Jordan K. Johnson, Stefan Johnson, Maren Morris, Michael Pollack, and Ali Tamposi
2025 (83rd)	KPop Demon Hunters	"Golden"	Ejae, Mark Sonnenblick, Ido, 24, and Teddy
2025 (83rd)	Avatar: Fire and Ash	"Dream as One"	Miley Cyrus, Andrew Wyatt, Mark Ronson, and Simon Franglen
2025 (83rd)	Sinners	"I Lied to You"	Raphael Saadiq and Ludwig Göransson
2025 (83rd)	Train Dreams	"Train Dreams"	Nick Cave and Bryce Dessner
2025 (83rd)	Wicked: For Good	"The Girl in the Bubble"	Stephen Schwartz
2025 (83rd)	Wicked: For Good	"No Place Like Home"	Stephen Schwartz

== Multiple wins ==
4 wins:

- Alan Menken

3 wins:

- Tim Rice

2 wins:

- Howard Ashman
- Carole Bayer Sager
- Alan and Marilyn Bergman
- Phil Collins
- Billie Eilish
- Marvin Hamlisch
- Will Jennings
- Elton John
- Johnny Mercer
- Giorgio Moroder
- Finneas O'Connell
- Benj Pasek
- Justin Paul
- Bruce Springsteen
- Bernie Taupin
- Dimitri Tiomkin
- U2
- Diane Warren
- Ned Washington

== See also ==
- Academy Award for Best Original Song
