= Academy Award Performance: And the Envelope, Please =

Academy Award Performance

Studio album by Maureen McGovern
- Released: 1975
- Studio: Gold Star (Hollywood, California)
- Label: 20th Century
- Producer: Carl Maduri

Maureen McGovern chronology
Nice to Be Around (1974)	Academy Award Performance (1975)	Maureen McGovern (1979)

Academy Award Performance: And the Envelope, Please is Maureen McGovern's third studio album, released in 1975. It was her last album for 20th Century Records.

== Background ==
Primarily a cover album, this album is completely devoted to Oscar-winning movie themes from the 1930s to 1974; it capitalizes the fact that it took McGovern only one year to introduce a second Oscar-winning song. The fourth track is a medley of "When You Wish Upon a Star" (from the 1940 animated film Pinocchio) and "Over the Rainbow" (from The Wizard of Oz). The album begins with just 34 seconds of the song "Thanks for the Memory" then fades into the next song ("The Continental," the oldest movie theme on this album). "Thanks for the Memory" is also the last track on the album and continues where it left off but fades immediately after the next verse.

== Release ==
There were two singles to come from this album: "We May Never Love Like This Again" (from The Towering Inferno, which was a minor hit for McGovern one year before) and "The Continental" (from the 1934 film The Gay Divorcee, which was the very first song to ever win an Oscar). Also during this year (and into 1976), McGovern recorded an entire album's worth of material for what would have been her fourth album on 20th Century Records. Only two singles from the project were released - "Even Better Than I Know Myself" and "Love Songs Are Getting Harder To Sing" (with the B-side "Stop Me If You've Heard This Song Before") - but due to poor reception of these singles on the pop chart, a full album was never released and remains in the vaults at Universal (parent company to 20th Century.)

== Track listing ==
Side I
No.	Title	Writer(s)	Length
1.	"Thanks for the Memory" (from Big Broadcast of 1938)	Leon Robin, Ralph Rainger	0:34
2.	"The Continental" (from The Gay Divorcee)	Con Conrad, Herb Magidson	2:55
3.	"For All We Know" (from Lovers and Other Strangers)	Fred Karlin, R. Wilson, A. James	3:27
4.	"When You Wish Upon a Star/Over the Rainbow" (from Pinocchio and The Wizard of Oz)	Leigh Harline, Ned Washington/Harold Arlen, E.Y. Harburg	4:26
5.	"Lullaby of Broadway" (from Gold Diggers of 1935)	Harry Warren, Al Dubin	3:03
6.	"The Morning After" (from The Poseidon Adventure)	Al Kasha, Joel Hirschhorn	2:20

Side II
No.	Title	Writer(s)	Length
1.	"The Windmills of Your Mind" (from The Thomas Crown Affair)	Michel LeGrand, Alan & Marilyn Bergman	3:02
2.	"Swingin' on a Star" (from Going My Way)	Johnny Burke, Jimmy Van Heusen	2:47
3.	"All the Way" (from The Joker Is Wild)	Sammy Cahn, Jimmy Van Heusen	2:19
4.	"We May Never Love Like This Again" (from The Towering Inferno)	Al Kasha, Joel Hirschhorn	2:10
5.	"You'll Never Know" (from Hello, Frisco, Hello)	Harry Warren, Mack Gordon	2:40
6.	"Thanks for the Memory" (from Big Broadcast of 1938)	Leo Robin, Ralph Rainger	0:30

== Personnel ==
- Perry Botkin, Jr. - special effects
- Tom Hensley, Mike Lang, Pete Jolly - piano
- Lee Ritenour, David Cohen, Neil Levang - guitar
- Max Bennett, Reinie Press, Steve LaFever - bass
- Joe Correro, Sol Gubin - drums
- Gene Estes - percussion
- Iz Baker, Paul Shure, Jerry Vinci, Sid Sharp, Tibor Zelig, Henry Ferber, Assa Drori, Jimmie Getzoff, Harry Bluestone, Erno Neufeld, Nate Ross - violin
- Dave Schwartz, Allan Harshman, Gerry Nuttycombe, Sven Reher - viola
- Ray Kramer, Fred Seykora, Armand Kaproff - cello
- Johnny Rotella, Gene Cipriano, Ronnie Lang, Bud Shank, Bill Green - woodwind
- Gayle Levant - harp
- Bill Peterson, Bud Brisbois, Tony Terran, Cappy Lewis, Buddy Childers - trumpet
- Charles Loper, Dick Nash - trombone

Technical

- Musical contractor: Charles H. Stern
- Engineers: Stan Ross, Joe B. Mauldin
- Design: Queens Graphics
- Photography: Sunny K. Kohn

== Charts ==
Chart (1975)	Peak position
Australia (Kent Music Report)	56
