= The Morning After =

The Morning After may refer to:

== Film ==
- The Morning After (1974 film), a television movie starring Dick Van Dyke
- The Morning After (1986 film), a film starring Jane Fonda

== Literature ==
- The Morning After (book), a 1993 book by Katie Roiphe

== Music ==
- The Morning After (Deborah Cox album), a 2002 album by Deborah Cox
- "The Morning After" (1937 song), a 1937 song recorded by Tommy Dorsey and His Orchestra
- The Morning After (The J. Geils Band album), a 1971 album by the J. Geils Band
- The Morning After (James album), a 2010 album by James
- The Morning After (Maureen McGovern album), a 1973 album by Maureen McGovern
  - "The Morning After" (Maureen McGovern song), a 1973 song by Maureen McGovern that was the theme song for The Poseidon Adventure
- The Morning After (Tankard album), a 1988 album by Tankard
- Morning After (album), a 2017 album by Dvsn
- "Morning After", a 2006 song by Dead by Sunrise from Underworld: Evolution: Original Motion Picture Soundtrack
- "The Morning After", a 1989 song from Faith No More's The Real Thing
- "The Morning After", a 1984 song from Ratt's Round and Round single

== Radio ==
- The Morning After (radio show), a program on Kerrang! Radio

== Television ==
- The Morning After, 2024 South African-French series

Episodes

- "The Morning After" (The Avengers), 1969
- "The Morning After" (American Horror Story), 2018
- "The Morning After" (Merseybeat), 2002

== Web series ==
- The Morning After (web series), a 2011 web series on Hulu

== See also ==
- Morning-after pill
