= Nice to Be Around =

Nice to Be Around may refer to:

- "Nice to Be Around" (song), a song from the 1973 film, Cinderella Liberty, performed by Maureen McGovern
- Nice to Be Around (Rosemary Clooney album), 1977
- Nice to Be Around (Maureen McGovern album), 1974
