= You're Getting to Be a Habit with Me =

1932 popular song

Song
- Published: 1932
- Composer: Harry Warren
- Lyricist: Al Dubin

"You're Getting to Be a Habit with Me" is a 1932 popular song with music by Harry Warren and the lyrics by Al Dubin, which became a standard. The lyrics of the song were noted for its references to addiction.

It appears in the Warner Brothers musical film 42nd Street, for which Warren and Dubin wrote three songs together. The song was inspired by one of the women working at the Warner Brothers studio. When asked why she was still dating a certain man, she said that he was "getting to be a habit with her". In the movie, it is sung by the lead female character, Dorothy Brock, played by Bebe Daniels.

The song was recorded with success by Guy Lombardo, with Bing Crosby on vocals, on January 12, 1933. Crosby also included the song in the short film Please (1933). Another popular recording of the song in 1933 was by Fred Waring and His Pennsylvanians. The song was performed by Doris Day in the musical Lullaby of Broadway in 1951. Since then, it has been performed by numerous artists.

== Recorded versions ==
- Betty Carter on Out There (1958)
- Petula Clark
- Perry Como
- Bebe Daniels
- Doris Day
- Skinnay Ennis
- Alice Faye
- Eydie Gormé on her Eydie Gorme on Stage (1959)
- Earl Hines
- Diana Krall on Love Scenes (1997)
- Nancy LaMott and Michael Feinstein on La Mott's, Ask Me Again (released in 2008)
- Peggy Lee on her Things Are Swingin' (1959).
- Guy Lombardo and his Royal Canadians featuring Bing Crosby.
- Julie London on her Julie (1957)
- Barry Manilow on Night Songs (2014)
- Shelly Manne on The West Coast Sound:Volume 1 (1956)
- Maureen McGovern on Another Woman in Love (1987)
- Anita O'Day on An Evening with Anita O'Day (1956)
- Jackie Paris
- Dick Powell
- Buddy Rich on Buddy and Sweets (1955)
- Frank Sinatra on Songs for Swingin' Lovers! (1956)
- Elaine Stritch on Stritch (1995)
- Mel Tormé

== Other ==
- Julie Stevens, a British actress, sings it in the television series The Avengers, in the 1962 episode titled "The Decapod". She sings it in a lounge scene with a jazz combo accompanying her (piano, drums & upright bass).
- Allan Sherman recorded a parody version, titled "You're Getting to Be a Rabbit with Me", on his 1963 album My Son, the Nut.

== Use in other media ==
- In 1989, the song was used in the season one episode of the TV series Midnight Caller entitled "Blame it on Midnight". The Frank Sinatra recording of the song was used in the 1998 film Fear and Loathing in Las Vegas.
