= The Morning After (Maureen McGovern album) =

Studio album by Maureen McGovern
- Released: July 1973
- Recorded: Spring 1973
- Studio: Agency Recording Studios, 1730 E. 24th Cleveland, OH 44114
- Genre: Pop
- Length: 29:56
- Label: 20th Century
- Producer: Carl Maduri

Maureen McGovern chronology
The Morning After (1973)	Nice to Be Around (1974)

Professional ratings
Review scores
Source	Rating
AllMusic	link

The Morning After was Maureen McGovern's first studio album, released in July 1973 (see 1973 in music).

The album was released by popular demand following an Academy Award win for Best Song for "The Morning After", written by Al Kasha and Joel Hirschhorn. After the song's subsequent rise up the Billboard Top 100 charts, the eponymous album was released, eventually peaking in September at #77 on the Billboard Hot 200 list of popular albums.

"The Morning After" is the first track on the record. McGovern composed the music for the fourth and sixth tracks. Cover versions include Paul Williams' "I Won't Last a Day Without You" (which was an adult-contemporary hit for McGovern before becoming a national hit for The Carpenters) and Buffy Sainte-Marie's "Until It's Time for You to Go".

McGovern dedicated the album to her parents, Mary and James McGovern.

== Track listing ==
Side 1
No.	Title	Writer(s)	Length
1.	"The Morning After" (Song from The Poseidon Adventure)	Al Kasha, Joel Hirschhorn	2:20
2.	"I Won't Last a Day Without You"	Paul Williams, Roger Nichols	3:52
3.	"And This I Find Is Beautiful"	Mack David, Larry Weiss	2:24
4.	"Midnight Storm"	Maureen McGovern, Jimmy Kennedy	2:41
5.	"It Might as Well Stay Monday (From Now On)"	Bodie Chandler	3:09

Side 2
No.	Title	Writer(s)	Length
1.	"If I Wrote You a Song"	Maureen McGovern, Jimmy Kennedy	3:07
2.	"Don't Try to Close a Rose"	Ginger Greco	3:04
3.	"Darlene"	Jonathan Cane	3:16
4.	"Can't You Hear the Song"	Chris Arnold, David Martin, Geoff Morrow	3:40
5.	"Until It's Time for You to Go"	Buffy Sainte-Marie	2:23

== Personnel and production ==
- Arranged by Joe Hudson (tracks 1, 4, 5 & 7), Michel Rubini (tracks 2 & 8), Gene Page (tracks 3, 6 & 10), Gary Kekel (in tandem with Joe Hudson on track 4) & Bob Hill (track 9)
- Conducted by Joe Hudson (tracks 1, 4, 5 & 7) & Bob Hill (tracks 2, 3, 6, 8, 9 & 10)
- Produced by Carl Maduri for Belkin-Maduri Productions
- Engineered and mixed by Arnie Rosenberg
- Bob Fraser - guitar
- Bill Severance - drums, percussion
- Recorded at: Agency Recording Studios 1730 E. 24th Cleveland, OH 44114

== Charts ==
Year	Chart	Position
1973	RPM Top 100 Albums	48
1973	Billboard Top LPs & Tape	77
