= Baby I'm Yours (album) =

Studio album by Maureen McGovern
- Released: March 10, 1992
- Recorded: August–October 1991
- Genre: Pop, standards, cover album
- Length: 51:50
- Label: RCA Victor
- Producer: Ron Barron

Maureen McGovern chronology
Greatest Hits (1990)	Baby I'm Yours (1992)	Out of This World (1996)

Professional ratings
Review scores
Source	Rating
AllMusic	3/5 stars

Baby I'm Yours is Maureen McGovern's eighth studio album (and first in three years), released in 1992.

This is a cover album of 15 songs from the years 1955 to 1970. Inside the album cover are notes that McGovern made about her youth in Youngstown, Ohio and specific notes on all of the selected songs on the album and how they are meaningful to her. The seventh track is a medley of two songs by the Beatles. Other songs include three songs by Burt Bacharach and Hal David (two of which were made popular by Dionne Warwick, one of her influences) and the Duprees' hit "You Belong to Me." The front of the album cover shows McGovern with her hair dyed red and her wearing a green diamond-covered outfit.

== Track listing ==
No.	Title	Writer(s)	Length
1.	"Are You There (With Another Girl)"	Burt Bacharach, Hal David	3:36
2.	"I Will"	John Lennon, Paul McCartney	2:37
3.	"Baby I'm Yours"	Van McCoy	3:37
4.	"It's All in the Game"	Carl Sigman, Charles Dawes	4:41
5.	"Angel on My Shoulder"	Shelby Flint	2:58
6.	"Sincerely"	Harvey Fuqua, Alan Freed	3:50
7.	"Things We Said Today/For No One"	John Lennon, Paul McCartney	5:18
8.	"You Belong to Me"	Pee Wee King, Redd Stewart, Chilton Price	3:42
9.	"Gonna Get Along Without You Now"	Milton Kellem	3:40
10.	"Put Your Head on My Shoulder"	Paul Anka	4:12
11.	"Blue on Blue"	Burt Bacharach, Hal David	3:49
12.	"You Don't Have to Say You Love Me"	P. Donaggio, Vicki Wickham, Simon Napier-Bell	3:37
13.	"Anyone Who Had a Heart"	Burt Bacharach, Hal David	4:09
14.	"You Can Close Your Eyes"	James Taylor	3:35

== Album credits ==
- Produced by: Ron Barron

Keyboards

- Jeff Harris for "Are You There (With Another Girl)," "I Will," "Baby I'm Yours," "Angel on My Shoulder," "Things We Said Today/For No One," "Blue on Blue," "Anyone Who Had a Heart," and "You Can Close Your Eyes"
- Mike Renzi for "It's All in the Game," "Sincerely," "You Belong to Me," "Gonna Get Along Without You Now," "Put Your Head on My Shoulder," "You Don't Have to Say You Love Me": Mike Renzi

Electric bass

- Anthony Jackson for all songs except "Things We Said Today/For No One" and "Blue on Blue"
- Mark Egan for "Things We Said Today/For No One" and "Blue on Blue"
- Acoustic and electric guitars: Jeff Mironov
- Drums and percussion: Allan Schwartzberg
- Alto sax, tenor sax, soprano sax, flute: Lou Marini
- Synth programmer and overdubs: Jamie Lawrence
- Electric violin on "Gonna Get Along Without You Now": Mark Feldman
- Harmonica on "Put Your Head on My Shoulder": William Galison
- The Clinton Chorus on "You Can Close Your Eyes": Cheryl Alexander, Megan Barron, Rob Fisher, Troy Halderson, Jeff Harris, Maureen McGovern, Susan H. Schulman
- Vocals and background harmonies: Maureen McGovern
- Background vocal harmonies "Blue on Blue" arranged by: Jeff Harris
- Chief recording engineer: Ed Rak
- Principal assistant engineer: Troy Halderson
- Assistant engineer: Jackie Brown
- Synthesizer programming: Jamie Lawrence
- Synthesizer recording engineer: Danny Lawrence
- Assistant engineers: Derrick Garrett, Joe Martin
- Album mixed by: Ed Rak and Ron Barron
- Music copying and contracting: Frank Zuback
- Recorded August–October 1991, Clinton Recording Studios
- Mastered at Sterling Sound by Ted Jensen
