= A Long and Winding Road =

Studio album by Maureen McGovern
- Released: April 29, 2008
- Recorded: February 2008
- Studios: Avatar Studios and Clinton Recording Studios, New York City
- Genres: Pop, standards
- Label: PS Classics
- Producer: Jeffrey Lesser

Maureen McGovern chronology
20th Century Masters – The Millennium Collection: The Best of Maureen McGovern (2005)	A Long and Winding Road (2008)

A Long and Winding Road is the twelfth studio album by Maureen McGovern, released in 2008 by PS Classics. It is a cover album of songs that were from the 1960s and early 1970s, written by notable songwriters of that era. Inside the album cover includes an essay by Philip Himberg (who is the Producing Artistic Director of the Sundance Institute Theatre Program) that covers Maureen McGovern's making of the album and the growth of the Great American Songbook during the 1960s.

== Track listing ==
No.	Title	Writer(s)	Length
1.	"All I Want/America"	Joni Mitchell/Paul Simon	3:22
2.	"The Times They Are a-Changin'"	Bob Dylan	3:31
3.	"The Circle Game"	Joni Mitchell	5:14
4.	"The 59th Street Bridge Song (Feelin' Groovy)" (with Jay Leonhart, vocals and bass, arranged by Jay Leonhart)	Paul Simon	1:40
5.	"Cowboy"	Randy Newman	2:23
6.	"The Coming of the Roads"	Billy Edd Wheeler	3:43
7.	"Will You Still Love Me Tomorrow?"	Carole King, Gerry Goffin	3:08
8.	"Shed a Little Light/Carry It On"	James Taylor/Gil Turner	4:32
9.	"The Fiddle and the Drum"	Joni Mitchell	3:03
10.	"Fire and Rain"	James Taylor	4:04
11.	"Rocky Raccoon"	John Lennon, Paul McCartney	3:31
12.	"Let It Be"	John Lennon, Paul McCartney	3:15
13.	"By the Time I Get to Phoenix"	Jimmy Webb	2:57
14.	"MacArthur Park"	Jimmy Webb	2:14
15.	"The Moon's a Harsh Mistress"	Jimmy Webb	3:24
16.	"And When I Die"	Laura Nyro	4:06
17.	"Imagine"	John Lennon	3:31
18.	"The Long and Winding Road"	John Lennon, Paul McCartney	1:30

== Album credits ==
- Music director/arranger – Jeff Harris
- Special guest appearance by – Jay Leonhart
- Produced by – Jeffrey Lesser
- Co-produced by – Maureen McGovern
- Executive producer – Dan Fortune
- A&R director – Philip Chaffin

== Personnel ==
- Jeff Harris – piano
- Jay Leonhart – bass
- Lou Marini Jr. – saxophone
- Jeffrey Carney – bass on "Circle Game," "Cowboy," and "By the Time I Get to Phoenix"
- Joseph Passaro – percussion
- Cenovia Cummins – violin
- Suzanne Chaplin – violin
- Debra Shufelt-Dine – viola
- Dorothy Lawson – cello
- Recorded at Avatar Studios and Clinton Recording Studios, February 2008
- Recorded by: Tom Lazarus
- Pro Tools operator: Bart Migal
- Assistant engineer: Tim Mitchell
- Mixed by: Jeffrey Lesser
- Mastered by: Joe Lambert, Trutone Mastering
- Art direction & design: John Costa, New Orleans
- Photographs by: Deborah Feingold
- Additional photos courtesy of: Maureen McGovern

=== For PS Classics, LLC ===
- Executive producer: Tommy Krasker
- A&R direction: Philip Chaffin
- Staff engineer: Bart Migal
