= Naughty Baby (album) =

Live album by Maureen McGovern
- Released: 1989
- Recorded: November 20, 1988
- Venue: Clinton Recording Studios Studio A, New York City
- Genre: Traditional pop
- Length: 58:38
- Label: CBS
- Producer: Ron Barron

Maureen McGovern chronology
State of the Heart (1988)	Naughty Baby (1989)	Greatest Hits (1990)

Professional ratings
Review scores
Source	Rating
AllMusic	4/5 stars

Naughty Baby is a live album by Maureen McGovern. It was recorded at Studio A at Clinton Recording Studios in New York City. The studio was converted into an intimate concert setting and invitations were sent to 150 guest.

The album consists of 24 songs that were all co-written by George Gershwin (Gershwin's brother Ira co-wrote the majority of the songs), one of them was a lost song entitled "A Corner of Heaven With You" (written c. 1918 with lyrics by Lou Paley). In the selection of "My Man's Gone Now," McGovern vocalizes and never sings. Between the songs "The Man I Love" and "Summertime," there is a piano solo that is provided by Jeff Harris. The last selection is a medley of two songs: "Love Is Here to Stay" and "Of Thee I Sing."

The last three pages inside the album cover contain liner notes from Michael Tilson Thomas, Roger Kellaway, Frances "Frankie" Gershwin Godowsky (sister of George and Ira Gershwin), Tommy Krasker, and Ron Barron respectively.

== Track listing ==
All tracks are written by George Gershwin and Ira Gershwin, except where noted.

No.	Title	Writer(s)	Length
1.	"(applause)"		0:18
2.	"Stiff Upper Lip" (from A Damsel in Distress, 1937)		3:22
3.	"Things Are Looking Up" (from A Damsel in Distress, 1937)		1:10
4.	"(I've Got) Beginner's Luck" (from Shall We Dance, 1937)		1:41
5.	"How Long Has This Been Going On?" (from Funny Face, 1927; and Rosalie, 1928))		4:12
6.	"By Strauss" (from The Show is On, 1936)		3:08
7.	"Naughty Baby" (from Primrose, 1924)	George Gershwin, Ira Gershwin, Desmond Carter	3:22
8.	"Love Walked In" (from The Goldwyn Follies, 1938)		1:50
9.	"Embraceable You" (from Girl Crazy, 1930)		2:21
10.	"A Corner of Heaven With You"	George Gershwin, Lou Paley	3:40
11.	"Somebody Loves Me" (from George White's Scandals of 1924)	George Gershwin, B.G. DeSylva, Ballard MacDonald	5:01
12.	"Little Jazz Bird" (from Lady, Be Good!, 1924)		3:32
13.	"My Man's Gone Now" (from Porgy and Bess, 1935)	George Gershwin, DuBose Heyward	2:05
14.	"Porgy, I's Yo' Woman Now" (from Porgy and Bess, 1935)	George Gershwin, DuBose Heyward	3:21
15.	"The Man I Love" (from Lady, Be Good!, 1924; Strike Up the Band, 1927; and Rosalie, 1928))		3:18
16.	"Piano Prelude II"		1:21
17.	"Summertime" (from Porgy and Bess, 1935)	George Gershwin, DuBose Heyward	2:15
18.	"Strike Up the Band" (from Strike Up the Band, 1927 & 1930)		0:50
19.	"Fascinating Rhythm" (from Lady, Be Good!, 1924)		1:40
20.	"Clap Yo' Hands" (from Oh, Kay!, 1926)		1:01
21.	"They Can't Take That Away from Me" (from Shall We Dance, 1937)		2:05
22.	"'S Wonderful" (from Funny Face, 1927))		1:07
23.	"They All Laughed" (from Shall We Dance, 1937)		0:50
24.	"I Got Rhythm" (from Girl Crazy, 1930)		1:05
25.	"Love Is Here to Stay/Of Thee I Sing" (the former from The Goldwyn Follies, 1938; the latter from Of Thee I Sing, 1931)	George Gershwin	3:03

== Personnel ==
Musicians

- Jeff Harris – piano, conductor
- Jay Leonhart – double bass
- Grady Tate – drums
- Lou Marini – reeds
- Mark Sherman – percussion and vibes

Arrangements

- "Stiff Upper Lip," "Things Are Looking Up," "(I've Got) Beginner's Luck," "A Corner of Heaven With You," "Somebody Loves Me," "Little Jazz Bird," "The Man I Love," "Piano Prelude II," "Summertime," "Gershwin Tribute," and "Love Is Here to Stay/Of Thee I Sing" arranged by Mike Renzi
- "By Strauss," "My Man's Gone Now," and "Porgy, I's Yo' Woman Now" arranged by Jeff Harris
- "How Long Has This Been Going On?" and "Embraceable You" arranged by Mike Renzi and Jeff Harris
- "Love Walked In": body of melody arranged by Mike Renzi; introduction and ending arranged by Jeff Harris

Additional personnel

- Cover design: Allen Weinberg
- Cover photo: Joyce Tenneson
- Hair design: Maggie Allen
- Dress courtesy of Giorgio di Sant'Angelo; earrings by Ted Muehling
- Live Gershwin concert written by Judy Barron, produced by Ron Barron, and directed by Susan H. Schulman
