= Another Woman in Love =

Studio album by Maureen McGovern
- Released: 1987
- Recorded: Fall 1985
- Genre: Pop, standards
- Length: 38:54
- Label: CBS
- Producer: Ron Barron and Maureen McGovern

Maureen McGovern chronology
Maureen McGovern (1979)	Another Woman in Love (1987)	State of the Heart (1988)

Another Woman in Love is Maureen McGovern's fifth studio album and her first one in eight years. It was recorded at Counterpoint Recording Studios in New York City in 1985 and was released two years later. It was the first album to categorize McGovern into the musical styles of jazz and pop standards and is one of two of her albums to contain only solo piano accompaniment. Of all the thirteen tracks on the album, only three of them are original (McGovern's longtime friend and collaborator Judy Barron wrote the lyrics to these three). The rest are simply covers of older songs by various American composers, though the album's first (and only) single was Peter Allen's "I Could Have Been a Sailor." The second track is a two-song medley of songs co-written by Jerome Kern.

The picture for the front of the album was photographed by Nancy LeVine in Le Madeleine, New York City. It shows that McGovern has kept her hair dyed brown but had curled it and let it grow down to her shoulders.

The first page inside the album cover contains liner notes from Mel Tormé and just one quote by McGovern ("This is the album I've always wanted to make.").

== Track listing ==
No.	Title	Writer(s)	Length
1.	"I Like You, You're Nice"	Blossom Dearie, Linda Albert	2:07
2.	"Long Ago (and Far Away)/All the Things You Are"	Jerome Kern, Ira Gershwin/Jerome Kern, Oscar Hammerstein II	3:22
3.	"I Could Have Been a Sailor"	Peter Allen	3:08
4.	"I Remember"	Stephen Sondheim	3:40
5.	"Rainy Days"	Jerry Ragovoy, Judy Barron	3:27
6.	"Make the Man Love Me"	Arthur Schwartz, Dorothy Fields	3:26
7.	"Why Can't I?"	Richard Rodgers, Lorenz Hart	3:39
8.	"Another Woman in Love"	Jeffrey D. Harris, Judy Barron	2:44
9.	"Something I Thought I'd Never Do"	Jeffrey D. Harris, Judy Barron	3:27
10.	"You're Getting to Be a Habit with Me"	Harry Warren, Al Dubin	3:08
11.	"Confession"	Arthur Schwartz, Howard Dietz	1:30
12.	"Right as the Rain"	Harold Arlen, E.Y. Harburg	3:04
13.	"Some Other Time"	Leonard Bernstein, Betty Comden, Adolph Green	1:47

== Album credits ==
- Piano: Mike Renzi
- Arrangements by: Mike Renzi
- Cover design: Christopher Austopchuk
- Cover photo: Nancy LeVine
- Liner notes: Mel Tormé
- Management: Barron Management

Counterpoint Studios:

- Engineers: Hugo Dwyer and Michael Golub
- Assistant engineers: Tom Brick and Steve Brauner
- Mixed by Ron Barron and Michael Golub

CBS Studios:

- Remixed by Ron Barron
- Engineer: Bud Graham
- Consultant: Gary Schultz

== Charts ==
Album - Billboard (North America)

Chart (1987)	Peak position
Top Contemporary Jazz Albums	8
