= Copperfield (musical) =

- Music: Al Kasha and Joel Hirschhorn
- Lyrics: Al Kasha and Joel Hirschhorn
- Book: Al Kasha and Joel Hirschhorn
- Basis: Novel David Copperfield by Charles Dickens
- Premiere: April 16, 1981: ANTA Playhouse
- Productions: 1981 Broadway

Copperfield is a 1981 musical with a book, music, and lyrics by Al Kasha and Joel Hirschhorn, who were nominated for the 1981 Tony Award for Best Original Score. It is based on the classic 1850 novel David Copperfield by Charles Dickens.

The Broadway production was directed and choreographed by Rob Iscove. It began previews at the ANTA Playhouse on March 25, opened on April 16, and closed on April 26 after 39 performances, including 26 previews.

== Principal cast ==
- Brian Matthews ..... Adult David
- Evan Richards ..... Young David
- Barrie Ingham ..... Uriah Heep
- Beulah Garrick ..... Mrs. Heep
- George S. Irving ..... Mr Micawber
- Linda Poser ..... Mrs. Micawber
- Mary Stout ..... Peggotty
- Mary Elizabeth Mastrantonio ..... Dora Spenlow
- Christian Slater ..... Billy Mowcher
- Lenny Wolpe ..... Mr. Dick
- Carmen Mathews ..... Aunt Betsey Trotwood
- Pamela McLernon ..... Clara Copperfield
- Brian Quinn ..... Mealy Potatoes
- Maris Clement ..... Jane Murdstone
- Gary Munch ..... Mick Walker

== Principal production credits ==
- Producers ..... Don Gregory, Mike Merrick, and Dome Productions
- Musical Director ..... Larry Blank
- Orchestrator ..... Irwin Kostal
- Scenic Design ..... Tony Straiges
- Costume Design ..... John David Ridge
- Lighting Design ..... Ken Billington
- Sound Design ..... John McClure

== Song list ==
Act I

- "I Don't Want a Boy" – Aunt Betsey Trotwood, Peggotty and Ensemble
- "Mama, Don't Get Married" – Young David, Clara Copperfield and Peggotty
- "Copperfield" – Young David, Mr. Quinion, Mealy Potatoes, Billy Mowcher, Mick Walker and Ensemble
- "Something Will Turn Up" – Mr. Micawber, Young David, Creditors and Ensemble
- "Anyone" – Young David
- "Here's a Book" – Aunt Betsey Trotwood, Mr. Dick and Young David
- "Here's a Book (Reprise)" – Betsey Trotwood, Mr. Dick and Adult David
- "Umble" – Uriah Heep and Mrs. Heep
- "The Circle Waltz" – Adult David, Dora Spenlow, Agnes Wickfield and Ensemble

Act II

- "Up the Ladder" – Uriah Heep and Mr. Micawber
- "I Wish He Knew" – Agnes Wickfield
- "The Lights of London" – Adult David, Dora Spenlow and Company
- "Umble (Reprise)" – Uriah Heep
- "Something Will Turn Up (Reprise)" – Mr. Micawber and Adult David
- "Villainy Is the Matter" – Adult David, Uriah Heep, Mr. Micawber, Agnes Wickfield, Aunt Betsey Trotwood, Mr. Dick, Mrs. Heep, Peggotty and Mrs. Micawber
- "With the One I Love" – Adult David
- "Something Will Turn Up (Reprise)" – Mr. Micawber and Ensemble
- "Anyone (Reprise)" – Adult David and Agnes Wickfield

== Critical reception ==
In his review in The New York Times, Frank Rich said,

This is the kind of musical that sends you out of the theater humming every score other than the one you've just heard . . . of course, derivativeness is nothing new in Broadway musicals that aspire to be pure commercial entertainments. The real problem with Copperfield is that its authors are not good mimics. From the music to the scenery to the cast, everything about this show looks tacky in comparison to its prototypes. And when the writers actually attempt to come up with fresh ideas - well, look out! The show's book manages to miss the human comedy, the tears and even the point of Dickens's novel. This is no longer the story of a boy's hard-won growth to emotional manhood, but a clunky, often incoherently told melodrama in which all the villains literally wear black . . . the title character seems an almost peripheral figure in the proceedings. He's played by two decent singers - one boy, one man - who are nothing if not chips off the same block. The block is made of wood . . . Some of the music is mildly tuneful, after its many fashions, but the lyrics are, at best, unintentionally funny . . . Rob Iscove's choreography departs from the show's norm, in that it seems to have been culled from flops rather than hits . . . it could be argued that Copperfield might be entertaining for young children, whose innocent minds aren't sullied by memories of the superior shows that this one dimly recalls. But it's hard to imagine what parent - short of an evil Dickensian one - would take the family to the ANTA when Annie, Barnum and The Pirates of Penzance are in town."
