= Funny Games =

Funny Games may refer to:

- Funny Games (1997 film), an Austrian horror film
- Funny Games (2007 film), a shot-for-shot remake of the 1997 film by the same director

== See also ==
- Fun and Games (disambiguation)
