= Seven Brides for Seven Brothers (musical) =

- London cast recording
- Music: Gene de Paul; Al Kasha; Joel Hirschhorn
- Lyrics: Johnny Mercer; Al Kasha; Joel Hirschhorn
- Book: Lawrence Kasha; David Landay
- Basis: 1954 film musical Seven Brides for Seven Brothers
- Productions: 1982 Broadway; 1985 West End; 2003 Madrid; 2005 Goodspeed Opera House; 2006 West End revival 2007 U.S. regional 2008 UK Tour; 2013/14 UK & Ireland Tour; 2015 2nd U.S. National Tour; 2015 West End revival

Seven Brides for Seven Brothers is a musical with a book by Lawrence Kasha and David Landay, music by Gene de Paul, Al Kasha and Joel Hirschhorn, and lyrics by Johnny Mercer, Al Kasha and Joel Hirschhorn. It is based on the 1954 Stanley Donen film of the same name which is, itself, an adaption of the short story "The Sobbin' Women," by Stephen Vincent Benét, based on the Ancient Roman legend of The Rape of the Sabine Women.

The show's 1978–79 premiere tour was canceled without reaching Broadway: after touring for eighteen months from 1981 a subsequent production opened on Broadway in July 1982, to close three days and five performances after its official opening. In 1985, a West End production had a six-week limited engagement run, with a further five and a half week West End run at The Prince of Wales Theatre. Revised versions of the musical have met with success in U.S. regional theatres and in amateur productions on both sides of the Atlantic.

== Synopsis ==
Act 1

In 1850s Oregon, Adam goes into town seeking a wife to run the household that consists of just himself and his six brothers. There he meets Milly, a waitress at a local restaurant. Milly and Adam rush into marriage and immediately return to Adam's remote ranch in the mountains. As soon as they return home, Adam reverts to his true self: an ill-mannered and inconsiderate slob. Milly meets his six brothers, Benjamin, Caleb, Daniel, Ephraim, Frank and Gideon, all of whom also share Adam's love for all things disorderly. Milly decides to reform the brothers and help them change their ways. She teaches them to dance and then takes them to a barn-raising. There, the six brothers meet six girls they like and start courting them. Conflicts arise when each of the six girls turns out to have her own jealous suitor. Upon returning home Adam reads his brothers the story of The Rape of the Sabine Women, inciting them to kidnap the girls and bring them back home with them.

Act 2

The brothers kidnap the girls and then cause an avalanche to fall and block the suitors' way, making the brothers' house unreachable until spring. The girls are crying and furious by the time they reach the house. An angry Milly scolds the boys and sends them all to live in the barn, and Adam flees up to their hunting cabin in the mountains to live by himself. They live there all through the winter, but by the time spring arrives, the girls miss the brothers' attention and find themselves to be in love. Gideon goes to the cabin and attempts to get Adam to return home by telling him that Milly had a baby girl. A changed Adam returns home to find his wife and newborn daughter waiting for him. The snow clears up and the angry suitors make their way up to the house in the mountains to find that the girls are happy and want to marry the brothers. The story ends with a shotgun wedding of the six remaining couples.

== Productions ==
=== U.S. national tours and Broadway ===
The stage musical version of Seven Brides for Seven Brothers was first performed in June 1978 in the Dallas Summer Musicals season with Howard Keel and Jane Powell reprising the lead roles they had played in the original movie 24 years earlier. The production – with Keel and Powell still attached – then proceeded on what was touted as a pre-Broadway tour playing limited engagements in St Louis, Kansas City (Missouri), Toronto and Atlanta. An engagement at the Pantages Theatre in Los Angeles was announced for November 1978 but instead the production went on hiatus until January 1979, revived then to play three Florida venues with the tour's end announced during its February 1979 Parker Playhouse (Fort Lauderdale) engagement, future engagements (in Cincinnati, Chicago and at the Pantages in Los Angeles) then being canceled. Columnist Liz Smith had in September 1978 shared "the story from the road" that Keel and Powell "are both saying that unless director-producer and script co-author Larry Kasha withdraws [from the production, it] will never come into New York [to play Broadway]", and in February 1978 columnist Earl Wilson attributed the show's folding to "squabbling between the stars...and the producers": Kasha's co-producer Zev Bufman would attribute the tour's preemption to the financial backer, subsequent to a "corporate shuffle", no longer making theatrical investments.

The musical was revived in 1981 as a vehicle for singer Debby Boone, with a June showcase engagement in the Akron-based Kenley Players season of 1981. Those performances were followed by an eighteen-month US tour launched with a December 1981 engagement at the Fox Theater (San Diego). Seven Brides for Seven Brothers would then open on Broadway at the Alvin Theatre on 8 July 1982 subsequent to fifteen preview performances: directed by Lawrence Kasha and choreographed by Jerry Jackson, the cast included Debby Boone as Milly and David-James Carroll as Adam as well as Jeff Calhoun, Lara Teeter, Craig Peralta, and Nancy Fox. Despite faring well with audiences and critics while on tour, the show did not impress the Broadway critics, with a particularly scathing New York Times critique by Frank Rich being blamed for the show's 11 July 1982 closure after five performances. (The closure caused a protest outside the New York Times building, where a group of some twenty cast members – Boone not among them – and fans of the show chanted and held picket signs demanding Rich retract his review presumably in vain hopes of a resultant reprieve for Seven Brides for Seven Brothers.) Seven Brides for Seven Brothers would receive a Tony Award nomination for Best Original Score.

=== 1985 West End ===
The musical premiered in the West End at the Old Vic, starting on July 2, 1985, and running for 41 performances. It starred Roni Page and Steve Devereaux and included Michaela Strachan as the bride Liza. The show also played at the Prince of Wales Theatre, Leicester Square produced by Michael Winter, and had a unique North American engagement playing for five weeks at the Royal Alexandra Theatre in Toronto. A cast recording of the London production was released by First Night Records produced by Norman Newell.

This West End production actually opened at the York Theatre Royal in April 1984 and had been on a successful UK tour with Newpalm Productions. Because of the early closure of “The Com is Green” with Deborah Kerr, the Old Vic was suddenly available for a few weeks until the planned opening of “The Cradle Will Rock” on August 14. This production filled the gap – though there was an ongoing dispute that said the show did not have the rights to play in London itself, only in the provinces. However, the situation seems to have resolved itself when “Seven Brides” returned to the West End – at the Prince of Wales – the following year where it ran for five-and-a-half months from 8 May 1986 to 26 October 1986, and again Newpalm Productions toured the UK a number of times during the following years.

A 2002 tour of the UK starred Dave Willetts.

=== 2003 Madrid ===
A Spanish production premiered at Teatro Nuevo Apolo on August 29, 2003, starring David Castedo as Adam and Xana García as Milly, and directed by Ricard Reguant with choreography by María Giménez.

=== 2005 Goodspeed Opera House ===
A major revival ran from April 15, 2005, through June 26, 2005, at the Goodspeed Opera House (Connecticut). It starred Jacquelyn Piro Donovan and Burke Moses and was directed by Greg Ganakas with choreography by Patti Colombo. The production earned positive reviews from Variety and The New York Times. The New York Times reviewer wrote: "Goodspeed Musicals has reshaped it with a couple of new musical numbers, Patti Colombo's athletic choreography, welcome humor and a good-natured energy that overshadows many shortcomings." Two songs, "Where Were You?" and "I Married Seven Brothers" were added, "Glad That You Were Born" was revised, and the book was heavily rewritten. With a realistic approach, rustic orchestrations and a focus on the Oregon Trail, the show was quite different from its film predecessor. Plans for a 2005-2006 National Tour of this production failed.

=== 2006 West End revival ===
A production ran at the West End Haymarket Theatre from August 16, 2006, through November 18, 2006.

=== Revised 2007 U.S. production ===
A revised version played at several venues, including the Paper Mill Playhouse (New Jersey) (April 11 – May 11, 2007), North Shore Music Theatre (May 29 – June 17, 2007), Theatre Under the Stars (June 26 – July 1, 2007), and Theater of the Stars (Atlanta) (June 26 – July 1, 2007). Under the direction of Scott Schwartz, set design was by Tony Award nominee, Anna Louizos and lighting by Tony Award winner Donald Holder. This production was a hybrid between the literal approach of the Goodspeed production and the slapstick camp of the original film. Tom Helm served as the production's music director.

The Paper Mill Playhouse announced a week prior to Seven Brides for Seven Brothers's scheduled premiere that a million dollar plus shortfall in operating expenses threatened to not only cancel the production but close the theater down indefinitely. Paper Mill would in fact be enabled to fund the production of Seven Brides for Seven Brothers throughout its scheduled run, the critical and popular success of the production clinching the 69-year old iconic theater's survival. Subsequent engagements of the production drew weak reviews, with some praise afforded Patti Colombo's acrobatic, athletic, and inventive choreography.

The 2007 revival is expected to be the version that will be licensed by Music Theatre International for stock and regional use.

=== UK regional tour (2008) ===
The musical toured in the UK during 2008, starring Steven Houghton and Susan McFadden, and played in over thirty cities, including The Liverpool Empire.

=== UK & Ireland National Tour (2013–14) ===
A new restaged version of the show is currently being produced and will open at The Churchill Theatre Bromley on 13 September 2013 before touring the UK & Ireland. The new re-staged production stars Sam Attwater & Helena Blackman and directed/choreographed by Patti Colombo. www.sevenbridesthemusical.com

=== Regent's Park Open Air Theatre (2015) ===
With Rachel Kavanaugh directing a cast led by Alex Gaumond as Adam and Laura Pitt-Pulford as Milly, Seven Brides For Seven Brothers was mounted at Regent's Park Open Air Theatre 16 July – 29 August 2015. The production was critically well-received, as exemplified by the assessment of Michael Billington of The Guardian: "[if] not exactly...in tune with modern gender politics [the play] comes off well [mostly] thanks to some exhilarating dancing [there being] several high points...vividly realised in Alistair David's choreography...Laura Pitt-Pulford endows the far-from-modern Milly with the right dogged determination, and Alex Gaumond even manages to find a few redemptive qualities in the Petruchio-like figure of Adam, who seems to think a wife is a domestic slave. Clearly the original book has [lost some] inherent chauvinism, and it says a lot for Kavanaugh's production that [Adam's song] 'A Woman Ought to Know Her Place'...seems less...a crude manifesto than the cry of a man in crisis. The show...boasts some good songs. But in the end it's the choreography, which rivals anything on the London stage, that makes this a musical worth reviving."

=== 2nd US National Tour (2015) ===
In January 2015, Prather Touring (a subsection of Prather Entertainment Group) produced a National Tour of the production. The tour played at venues in over 30 states and was followed by an eight-week sit-down at the Broadway Palm Dinner Theatre in Ft Myers, FL. The cast was headed up by Justun Hart as Adam and Kate Marshall as Milly. The brothers were played by Wes Drummond (Benjamin), Carver Duncan (Caleb), Matt Casey (Daniel), Ben Cramer (Ephraim), Will Leonard (Frank) and Max King (Gideon). The brides were played by Diane Huber (Dorcas), Danielle Barnes (Ruth / Dance Captain), Kelsey Beckert (Liza), Avery Bryce Epstein (Martha), Corinne Munsch (Sarah) and Kiersten Benzing (Alice). The suitors were played by Sean Cleary (Nathan), Marty Craft (Luke), Joshua Kolberg (Matt), Olin Davidson (Joel), Corey John Hafner (Zeke), and Glenn Britton (Jeb). The cast was rounded out by Dustin Cunningham and Courtney Cunningham as the Hoallums, Michael Weaver as the Preacher and Katharine Gentsch as the Swing. The production was directed by Dean Sobon, choreographed by Kerry Lambert, and music directed by Scott Williams.

== Musical numbers ==
Act I

- Bless Your Beautiful Hide – Adam
- Wonderful, Wonderful Day – Milly and Brides
- One Man – Milly
- Goin' Courtin' – Milly and Brothers
- Social Dance – Milly, Adam, Brides, Brothers, Suitors and Townspeople
- Love Never Goes Away – Adam, Milly and Gideon
- Sobbin' Women – Adam and Brothers

Act II

- The Townsfolk's Lament – Suitors and Townspeople
- A Woman Ought To Know Her Place – Adam
- We Gotta Make It Through The Winter – Brothers
- We Gotta Make It Through The Winter (Reprise) – Milly and Brides
- Spring Dance – Brides and Brothers
- A Woman Ought To Know Her Place (Reprise) – Adam and Gideon
- Glad That You Were Born – Milly, Brides, Brothers
- Love Never Goes Away (Reprise) – Milly and Adam
- Wonderful, Wonderful Day (Reprise) – Milly and Adam
- Wedding Dance – Milly, Adam, Brides, Brothers and Townspeople

=== Notes ===
"One Man", "Love Never Goes Away", "The Townsfolk's Lament", " A Woman Ought To Know Her Place", "We Gotta Make It Through The Winter", "Spring Dance", and "Glad That You Were Born" were written by Al Kasha and Joel Hirschhorn for the musical.

"Bless Your Beautiful Hide", "Wonderful Wonderful Day", "Goin' Courtin'", and "Sobbin' Women" are from the 1954 film and written by Gene de Paul and Johnny Mercer.

NEW REVISED VERSION

Act I

- Opening Act I (Adam's Introduction) – Adam
- Gallant and Correct – Mr. & Mrs. Sander, Mr. Hoallum, Preacher, Brides, Suitors, Town Elders
- Bless Your Beautiful Hide – Adam
- Wonderful, Wonderful Day – Milly, Mrs. Sander, Mrs. Hoallum, Brides
- I Married Seven Brothers – Milly, Townspeople
- Goin' Courtin' – Milly, Brothers
- Challenge Dance – Orchestra
- Love Never Goes Away – Adam, Gideon, Milly
- Sobbin' Women – Adam, Brothers

Act II

- The Suitor's Lament – Suitors, Townspeople
- Where Were You? – Adam
- We Gotta Make It Through the Winter – Brothers
- We Gotta Make It (reprise)/Lonesome Polecat – Milly, Brothers
- Spring Dance – Orchestra
- Glad That You Were Born – Milly, Brothers, Brides
- Love Never Goes Away (reprise) – Adam, Milly
- Wonderful Day (reprise) – Milly, Adam
- Wedding Dance/Finale Act II – Company

== Awards and nominations ==
=== Original Broadway production ===
Year	Award ceremony	Category	Nominee	Result
1983	Tony Award	Best Original Score	Al Kasha, Joel Hirschhorn, Johnny Mercer, and Gene de Paul	Nominated

== Sources ==
- Broadwayworld.com article, June 1, 2007, Seven Brides for Seven Brothers” Romps in the Regions
