= Angie (TV series) =

American sitcom (1979–1980)

- Genre: Sitcom
- Created by: Garry Marshall; Dale McRaven
- Developed by: Alan Eisenstock; Larry Mintz
- Starring: Donna Pescow; Robert Hays; Doris Roberts; Debralee Scott; Diane Robin; Tammy Lauren; Sharon Spelman; Tim Thomerson
- Theme music composer: Norman Gimbel (Lyrics); Charles Fox
- Opening theme: "Different Worlds" performed by Maureen McGovern
- Country of origin: United States
- Original language: English
- No. of seasons: 2
- No. of episodes: 36

Production
- Executive producers: Bob Ellison; Dale McRaven; Leonora Thuna
- Producers: Alan Eisenstock; Bruce Johnson; Larry Mintz
- Camera setup: Multi-camera
- Running time: 24 minutes
- Production companies: Miller-Milkis Productions (season 1); Miller-Milkis-Boyett Productions (season 2); Henderson Production Company, Inc.; Paramount Television

Original release
- Network: ABC
- Release: February 8, 1979 – September 4, 1980

Angie is an American sitcom television series that aired on ABC from February 8, 1979, to September 4, 1980. The series was created by Garry Marshall and Dale McRaven, and produced by Miller-Milkis Productions (Miller-Milkis-Boyett in Season 2) in association with Paramount Television.

The series stars Donna Pescow in the lead role, Robert Hays as her love interest and eventual husband, Doris Roberts as her mother, and Debralee Scott as her sister.

The complete series was released as a Region 1 DVD set on September 1, 2017.

== Premise ==
In Philadelphia, Italian-American coffee-shop waitress Angie Falco starts a romance with customer Bradley Benson, a pediatrician. While she assumes that he is a struggling young doctor, he reveals that he is actually rebelling against his wealthy family.

The other Falco family members are Angie's mother Theresa and her younger sister Marie. Angie and Marie's father walked out on the family many years earlier, but Theresa continues to set a place for him at the dinner table. Brad's relatives consist of his stuffy father Randall, his overbearing and much-married-then-divorced sister Joyce, and Joyce's daughter Hillary, with whom Angie forms a close bond.

Frustrated by the arguments between their families over their wedding plans, Angie and Brad elope. Later, Theresa arranges a small Catholic family wedding, merging their two very different families: the blue-blooded suburban Bensons and the blue-collar urban Italian-American Falcos. Following the wedding, Brad purchases the coffee shop for Angie.

In the second season, Angie and Theresa open a beauty salon where they must contend with pleasure-seeking hairstylist Gianni. The characters of Hillary Benson and Didi Malloy were not continued after the first season.

== Characters ==
Angelina "Angie" Falco, later Angie Benson (Donna Pescow), is the title character. At first a waitress at the Liberty Coffee Shop in Philadelphia, she meets Dr. Brad Benson, who works at the medical center across the street. Angie is initially unsure about dating him because of their economic differences, but he convinces her that he loves her. Angie then elopes with him because the families continuously argue about the wedding details. She later accedes to her mother's wishes and has a small Catholic wedding ceremony. Brad buys the coffee shop for Angie to keep her busy, but she later sells it to buy a beauty salon where she employs her mother and sister.

Bradley Benson, M.D. (Robert Hays), is Angie's wealthy pediatrician boyfriend and then husband. Following his wedding to Angie, the couple first live in the large home that he inherited from his parents, but it intimidates her, so they move to a smaller duplex home where Brad practices medicine next door.

Theresa Falco (Doris Roberts) is Angie's and Marie's mother. Her husband deserted the family 19 years earlier, but she remains in denial, still setting a place at the dinner table for him. She loves Brad and wants to make sure that he loves Angie. She is horrified when Angie elopes with Brad but convinces Angie to have a small Catholic wedding ceremony. She owns a newsstand, which she sells in the second season. She is then hired by Angie to work at the beauty salon.

Marie Falco (Debralee Scott) is Theresa's younger daughter and Angie's younger sister. She works nights at a daycare center. Marie is well-meaning but clumsy. In the second season, Angie hires her to work at the beauty salon.

Diedre "DiDi" Malloy (Diane Robin) is Angie's loudmouthed best friend and coworker at the Liberty Coffee Shop (in the second season, the character only appears twice).

Joyce Benson (Sharon Spelman) is Brad's snobby three-times-married older sister. She dislikes Angie because she feels that Brad could have married someone of his own station. However, she does try to get along with Angie.

Hillary Benson (Tammy Lauren) is Joyce's daughter (not seen in the second season, as the character was dropped without explanation). She is happy about her uncle's marriage and instantly bonds with her new aunt.

Randall Benson (John Randolph) is Brad's and Joyce's father and Hillary's grandfather. At first, he is stunned by Angie and her family, but as he realizes that she and Brad love each other, he begins to like her and her family.

Phipps (Emory Bass) is the Benson family butler. He likes Angie.

Gianni (Tim Thomerson) is the hairstylist at Rose's House of Beauty, the beauty salon bought by Angie and Theresa after they sold the newsstand and coffee shop. He chases after his female clients to the annoyance of Angie and Theresa.

Mary Mary (Valri Bromfield), Mary Grace (Susan Duvall), and Mary Katherine (Nancy Lane) are three close friends and former schoolmates of Angie's.

== Production ==
Although Thomas L. Miller, Robert L. Boyett and Edward K. Milkis were the show's supervising producers for the second season, the show was produced by Miller-Milkis Productions at Paramount Television. Angie was also one of the few Miller-Milkis productions that did not take place in Miller's hometown of Milwaukee, Wisconsin.

=== Theme song ===
The show's theme song, "Different Worlds," was written by Norman Gimbel and Charles Fox and performed by Maureen McGovern in a characteristic style of disco, a very popular genre in the late 70s.

The song was released as a single from her self-titled fourth studio album Maureen McGovern in June 1979 via Curb Records. "Different Worlds" peaked at No. 18 on the Billboard Hot 100 and spent two weeks at No. 1 on the Billboard adult contemporary chart, McGovern's only No. 1 on that chart.

Main cast

== Cancellation ==
The show was a ratings hit during its first half-season on air. It ranked fifth for the 1978–79 season with a 26.7 average household share, thanks in big part to Thursday night lead-in Mork & Mindy, which ranked No. 3. All of the top five shows in 1978–79 were ABC comedies; the others were Laverne & Shirley (No. 1), Three's Company (No. 2) and Happy Days (tying Mork & Mindy at No. 3).

The show was placed in a strong timeslot for 1979–80 fall season, airing between Happy Days and Three's Company on Tuesday nights. However, its Nielsen rating dipped to 19.3, though Laverne & Shirley, which the network renewed, earned an identical rating. The show was moved to Monday nights following the NFL season (when ABC's Monday Night Football slot was vacated). In February 1980, ABC placed the show on indefinite hiatus. It returned in April on Saturday nights, but the series was officially canceled in May. Upon its cancellation, Donna Pescow, who had previously thought that the series had a 50-50 chance of renewal, said: "I don't try to understand it anymore. You have to take it as a big chess game and the only person who sees the total logic is the person making the moves."

The four remaining Season 2 episodes produced before the cancellation were aired later in the year, with the final episode airing on September 4, 1980. A total of 36 episodes were produced.

== Episodes ==
=== Season 1 (1979) ===
No. overall	No. in season	Title	Directed by	Written by	Original release date
1	1	"The Proposal"	Howard Storm	Alan Eisenstock & Larry Mintz	February 8, 1979
Angie waits for Brad at the coffee shop, only for him to ask her out. Brad is then confronted by his sister Joyce, who disapproves of his date. Angie then visits Brad's place, and she finds out that he isn't poor. Angie leaves as she just couldn't handle being lied to. After Brad apologizes, Angie feels bad and they decide to break the news to her mother.
2	2	"Wedding Wings"	Howard Storm	Story by : Thad Mumford & Dan Wilcox; Teleplay by : Alan Eisenstock & Larry Mintz	February 15, 1979
Brad tells his father Randall about his plans with Angie, and he wants him to invite both Angie and her mother on a trip to Florida. Theresa is nervous about flying, but Angie is afraid of meeting Brad's father. Theresa panics and decides to rush home instead. Theresa gets Brad's father to arrive there instead for dinner. While he's there, he asks questions about Angie and her family, and they find out that he investigated their family. Brad's father and Theresa get into an argument about the plates and Angie and Brad ask if they can get married, and he agrees.
3	3	"The Elopement"	Jeff Chambers	Emily Levine	February 22, 1979
Theresa arrives at Brad's place to plan out Angie and Brad's wedding. Conflict arises and Brad later suggests that they should elope for their marriage. Their car gets stolen and they turn to the sheriff for help, who then offers to help to get the two married and back home before Theresa finds out. Guest Star: Dolph Sweet as the Sheriff
4	4	"The Morning After"	Jeff Chambers	Thad Mumford & Dan Wilcox	March 1, 1979
Theresa writes invitations for Brad and Angie's wedding, but is oblivious to the fact that they've already been married. They call to inform her but Marie picks up instead and promises to keep the whole elopement secret for them. Later they are all invited over to Brad's place so they can break the news to her and Brad's family. Both sides disagree about their elopement and Theresa pledges to never see Angie ever again.
5	5	"The Adjustment"	Jeff Chambers	Simon Muntner	March 15, 1979
Angie leaves her job and moved in with Brad, but soon finds herself bored.
6	6	"Theresa's Date"	Jeff Chambers	Emily Levine	March 22, 1979
Brad's father and Angie's mother start dating.
7	7	"The House Guests"	Jeff Chambers	Alan Eisenstock & Larry Mintz	March 29, 1979
Theresa and Marie are evicted from their homes, forcing them to live Brad and Angie, which begins to get on their nerves.
8	8	"The Opportunity"	Howard Storm	Richard B. Eckhaus	April 12, 1979
Theresa suggests Marie become Brad's receptionist, he accepts, but it soon becomes a mistake.
9	9	"Joyce's Job"	Jeff Chambers	Emily Levine	April 19, 1979
Joyce actually has to look for a job now that her alimony payments have come to an end.
10	10	"The First Fight"	Jeff Chambers	Jeff Franklin	April 26, 1979
After Brad hangs out with friends, drinks and comes home late, he and Angie get into the first fight with each other they've ever had.
11	11	"Angie's Good Deed"	Jeff Chambers	Kathy Speer & Terry Grossman	May 10, 1979
Angie tries to find love interest for her friends, starting with Didi and drags Brad along into it.
12	12	"The Check Up"	Tony Mordente	Alan Eisenstock & Larry Mintz	May 17, 1979
When Angie's mother is in pain, Angie brings in Brad to do something, not that her is enthusiastic.

=== Season 2 (1979–80) ===
No. overall	No. in season	Title	Directed by	Written by	Original release date
13	1	"Angie's Old Friends"	Jeff Chambers	Emily Marshall	September 11, 1979
14	2	"The First Separation"	Lowell Ganz	Emily Marshall	September 18, 1979
15	3	"Moving Day"	Harvey Medlinsky	Sheldon Bull	September 25, 1979
16	4	"Marie's Crush"	Lowell Ganz	Ellen Guylas	October 2, 1979
17	5	"The Gift"	Robert Drivas	Gary H. Miller	October 23, 1979
18	6	"The Thief"	Lowell Ganz	Louis Del Grande & David Barlow	October 30, 1979
19	7	"Vinnie's Return"	Lowell Ganz	Kenneth Berg	November 6, 1979
20	8	"Uncle Cheech"	Robert Drivas	Leonard Ripps	November 13, 1979
21	9	"Family Feud"	Norman Abbott	Emily Marshall, Sheldon Bull & Leonard Ripps	November 20, 1979
22	10	"Harvey's Mother"	Jeff Chambers	Leonora Thuna	November 27, 1979
23	11	"Mary Mary Marries"	John Tracy	Emily Marshall	December 4, 1979
24	12	"The Gambler"	John Tracy	Gary Kott	December 11, 1979
25	13	"Coffee Wars"	Lowell Ganz	Bruce A. Taylor	December 18, 1979
26	14	"Angie and Brad's Close Encounter"	John Tracy	Emily Marshall	January 14, 1980
27	15	"The Beauty Shop"	John Tracy	Diane Asselin	January 21, 1980
28	16	"Theresa's Gigolo"	John Tracy	Sheldon Bull	February 4, 1980
29	17	"Marie Moves Out"	John Tracy	Sheldon Bull	February 11, 1980
30	18	"Brad's Best Buddy"	John Tracy	Gloria Banta	April 12, 1980
31	19	"February Fever"	Tony Mordente	Sheldon Bull	April 19, 1980
32	20	"The President's Coming, the President's Coming!"	Tony Mordente	Carmen Finestra	April 26, 1980
33	21	"The Kid Down the Block"	John Tracy	Harry Cauley	July 31, 1980
34	22	"Friends in Need"	John Tracy	Emily Marshall	August 7, 1980
35	23	"Angie and the Doctor"	John Tracy	Pamela Morrison	August 28, 1980
36	24	"Angie and Joyce Go to Jail"	Doris Roberts	Gideon Farr	September 4, 1980

== Home media ==
Visual Entertainment released the complete series on DVD in Region 1 on September 1, 2017.

== Syndication ==
Reruns aired on ABC Daytime from June 17 to September 20, 1985.
