= Fun and Games =

Fun and Games may refer to:

== Music ==
- Fun and Games (The Huntingtons album), 1997
- Fun & Games (The Connells album), 1989
- Fun and Games (Chuck Mangione album), 1979
- The Fun and Games, a 1960s sunshine pop band from Texas
- Fun and Games, The Wiggles album, 2020
- "Fun and Games", a song by the Barenaked Ladies from Barenaked Ladies Are Me
- "Fun and Games", a song by Junior Byles, 1972; covered by Caesars Palace on Cherry Kicks, 2000.

== Film and TV ==
- Fun and Games (film), a 1971 British film by Ray Austin
- Fun and Games (1980 film), a TV movie directed by Paul Bogart (credited as Alan Smithee)
- "Fun and Games" (Better Call Saul), a 2022 television episode
- "Fun and Games" (The Outer Limits), a 1964 television episode
- "Fun and Games" (Soldier Soldier), a 1991 television episode
- "Fun and Games" (Superman: The Animated Series), a 1996 television episode
- "Fun and Games", an episode of Playhouse Disney TV series Handy Manny
- "Fun & Games" (Agents of S.H.I.E.L.D.)

== Other ==
- "Fun and Games", the first act of the play Who's Afraid of Virginia Woolf? by Edward Albee
- Fun and Games, a comic book series by Owen McCarron
- Fun 'n Games, a Super NES and Sega Mega Drive/Genesis video game

== See also ==
- Funny Games (disambiguation)
