= Out of This World (Maureen McGovern album) =

Studio album by Maureen McGovern
- Released: March 12, 1996
- Genre: Pop, standards
- Length: 48:08
- Label: Sterling
- Producer: Maureen McGovern, Brian Panella

Maureen McGovern chronology
Baby I'm Yours (1992)	Out of This World (1996)	The Music Never Ends (1997)

Out of This World is Maureen McGovern's ninth studio album (and first in four years), released in 1996.

This is a cover album of 16 songs that were written or co-written by Harold Arlen. The third track is a two-song medley, and the twelfth track is a three-song medley. The album was reissued in November 2003 with two bonus tracks: "Let's Fall in Love" and "Optimistic Voices".

== Track listing ==
No.	Title	Length
1.	"Any Place I Hang My Hat Is Home" (lyric: Johnny Mercer; 1946 - from the musical production St. Louis Woman)	4:29
2.	"Come Rain or Come Shine" (lyric: Johnny Mercer; 1946 - from the musical production St. Louis Woman)	2:52
3.	"Ac-cent-tchu-ate the Positive/Get Happy" (lyric: Johnny Mercer; 1944 - from the motion picture Here Come the Waves/lyric: Ted Koehler; 1929 - from the musical production Nine-Fifteen Revue)	3:01
4.	"It's Only a Paper Moon" (lyric: Billy Rose, E.Y. Harburg; 1933 - from the musical production The Great Magoo)	2:16
5.	"A Sleepin' Bee" (lyric: Truman Capote; 1954 - from the musical production House of Flowers)	4:07
6.	"Ding Dong the Witch Is Dead" (lyric: E.Y. Harburg; 1938 - from the motion picture The Wizard of Oz)	2:39
7.	"Over the Rainbow" (lyric: E.Y. Harburg; 1938 - from the motion picture The Wizard of Oz)	3:40
8.	"Let's Take a Walk Around the Block" (lyric: Ira Gershwin, E.Y. Harburg; 1934 - from the musical production Life Begins at 8:40)	3:54
9.	"Don't Like Goodbyes" (lyric: Truman Capote; 1954 - from the musical production House of Flowers)	3:18
10.	"Right as the Rain" (lyric: E.Y. Harburg; 1944 - from the musical production Bloomer Girl)	3:14
11.	"Out of This World" (lyric: Johnny Mercer; 1945 - from the motion picture Out of This World)	4:49
12.	"The Man That Got Away/Stormy Weather/Blues in the Night" (lyric: Ira Gershwin; 1954 - from the motion picture A Star Is Born/lyric: Ted Koehler; 1933 - from Cotton Club Parade - 2nd Edition/lyric: Johnny Mercer; 1941 - from the motion picture Blues in the Night)	7:09
13.	"My Shining Hour" (lyric: Johnny Mercer; 1943 - from the motion picture The Sky's the Limit)	2:40

== Album credits ==
- Produced by Maureen McGovern and Brian Panella
- Executive producer: Pat Moran
- Arranged by: Mike Renzi ("Stormy Weather" and "Blues in the Night" based on piano arrangement by John Oddo)
- Piano and keyboards: Mike Renzi
- Bass: Jay Leonhart
- Alto sax, soprano saxophones, flutes: Lou Marini
- Drums: Allan Schwartzberg
- Acoustic and electric guitars: Joe Beck
- Percussion and vibes: James Saporito
- Percussion: Cyro Baptista
- Synth programmers: Jamie Lawrence, Ken Bichel
- Digitally recorded, mixed and mastered by Ed Rak at Clinton Recording Studios, New York, NY
- Music copying and contracting: Kaye - Houston Music
