= Charles Fox (composer) =

American composer for film and television

- Born: Charles Ira Fox; October 30, 1940 (age 85); New York City, U.S.
- Occupation: Composer
- Years active: 1965-present
- Spouse: Joan Susan Redman (1962-present)
- Children: 3
- Website: http://www.charlesfoxmusic.com/

Charles Ira Fox (born October 30, 1940) is an American composer for film and television. His compositions include the sunshine pop musical backgrounds which accompanied every episode of the 1970s ABC-TV show Love, American Style; the theme song for the late 1970s ABC series The Love Boat; and the dramatic theme music to ABC's Wide World of Sports and the original Monday Night Football; as well as the Grammy-winning hit song "Killing Me Softly with His Song", written in collaboration with Lori Lieberman and Fox's longtime writing partner, Norman Gimbel.

== Early life ==
Fox was born in The Bronx, New York City, the son of Mollie and Walter Fox. Walter was a Jewish immigrant from Szydlowiec, Poland.

While still a student at the High School of Music & Art, Fox studied jazz piano with Lennie Tristano. He then continued his musical education with Nadia Boulanger, first at Fontainebleau and then privately in Paris. Following his return to the United States, he studied electronic music with Vladimir Ussachevsky at Columbia University. He married Joan Susan Redman on September 9, 1962.

== Career ==
Fox's career started by playing the piano for, composing, and arranging for artists in NYC's vibrant Latin music scene such as Ray Barretto, Joe Quijano and Tito Puente. He also wrote theme music and arranged for Skitch Henderson and The Tonight Show Orchestra. Fox worked under the banner of Bob Israel's Score Productions where he composed the themes for several Goodson-Todman game shows including NBC's version of the Match Game, the syndicated versions of What's My Line?, and To Tell The Truth, whose lyrics were written by Goodson-Todman director Paul Alter. He co-composed the theme song and all the original scores for Love, American Style, along with Arnold Margolin. Fox began working with record producer and songwriter Bob Crewe. The pair are responsible for the 1968 movie soundtrack, Barbarella starring actress Jane Fonda. Their successful working relationship prompted Crewe to hire Fox to arrange his next project, Lotti Golden's iconic 1969 album, Motor-Cycle (album) on Atlantic Records.

Fox also composed the music for "Killing Me Softly with His Song," featuring lyrics by Norman Gimbel and Lori Lieberman, in 1972. The song was inspired by Lieberman listening to Don McLean sing at a nightclub in Los Angeles. Fox and Gimbel had been managing her early career, and the song was released first by Lieberman, with writing credit assigned to Fox and Gimbel, cutting Lieberman out. Lieberman's version was only a minor hit, but the song became an international number 1 hit for Roberta Flack in 1973 and again for the Fugees in 1997. The song won the Grammy for Best Song in 1973. Although Fox and Gimbel both initially made statements in the press crediting the genesis of the song to Lieberman, both have since (as early as 1997) denied Lieberman's involvement. In contrast, the song's muse, Don McLean posted information on his website about the song, crediting Lieberman; Fox and Gimbel failed to force McLean to change his website, with McLean responding to the demand by sending the two an article from 1973 where they had made statements explicitly describe Lieberman's contribution to the song.

Fox and Gimbel later wrote the themes for many films such as The Last American Hero ("I Got a Name", sung by Jim Croce), Foul Play ("Ready to Take a Chance Again", sung by Barry Manilow) and many television series, including The Bugaloos, Happy Days, Laverne & Shirley ("Making Our Dreams Come True" sung by Cyndi Grecco), Angie ("Different Worlds" sung by Maureen McGovern), The Paper Chase ("The First Years" sung by Seals and Crofts; Emmy-nominated Best Song), and Wonder Woman. He also wrote "Together Through The Years" along with fellow composer Stephen Geyer for The Hogan Family series, sung by Roberta Flack.

In 1977, Fox composed "Love Boat", the theme to the popular TV series The Love Boat. It had lyrics by Paul Williams, and was sung by Jack Jones until the ninth and final season when Dionne Warwick was featured. The single released by Jack Jones in 1979 peaked at #37 on the Billboard US Adult Contemporary chart.

In February 1981, Fox peaked at #75 on the Billboard Hot 100 with the song, "Seasons". It was co-written and co-produced by Ed Newmark.

In 2010, Fox published his memoirs, Killing Me Softly: My Life in Music.

"The Charles Fox Singers" was the credited name for the group vocalists who performed his compositions on television and movie themes and cues; they were actually The Ron Hicklin Singers.

== Film scores ==
In total Fox has created film scores for over 100 films including:

- Barbarella (1968)
- The Green Slime (English language version, 1969. Stock music selection only, no composing)
- Goodbye, Columbus (1969)
- Pufnstuf (1970)
- Making It (1971)
- Star Spangled Girl (1971)
- Women in Chains (1972)
- A Separate Peace (1972)
- Dying Room Only (1973)
- The Laughing Policeman (1973)
- The Last American Hero (1973) (NY Film critics Best Song of the year "I Got a Name")
- The Stranger Within (1974)
- Bug (1975)
- The Other Side of the Mountain (1975) (Oscar and Golden Globe Nominated, Best Song "Richard's Window" and Best Score)
- The Duchess and the Dirtwater Fox (1976)
- Two-Minute Warning (1976)
- Victory at Entebbe (1976)
- One on One (1977)
- Foul Play (1978) (Oscar & Golden Globe nominated, Best Song "Ready To Take A Chance Again")
- The Last Married Couple in America (1980)
- Little Darlings (1980)
- Oh, God! Book II (1980)
- 9 to 5 (1980)
- Six Pack (1982)
- Strange Brew (1983)
- National Lampoon's European Vacation (1985)
- Doin' Time (1985)
- Christmas Comes to Willow Creek (1987)
- Short Circuit 2 (1988)
- The Gods Must Be Crazy II (1990)
- Repossessed (1990)
- A Thousand Heroes (1992)
- Christmas in Connecticut (1992)
- Gordy (1995)

== Awards and honors ==
- Fox was inducted into the Songwriters Hall of Fame in 2004.
- BMI Richard Kirk Award For Outstanding Life Achievement
- Grammy Awards – Grammy Award for Song of the Year - "Killing Me Softly with His Song"
- New York Film Critics Circle – Best Film Song - “I Got a Name”
- Emmy Awards – Best Score - “Love American Style”
- Emmy Winner – Best Theme Song - “Love American Style”
- Emmy Nomination (Four Times) – Best Score, “Love American Style”
- Emmy Nomination – Best Song, “The Paper Chase”
- Academy Award nomination – Academy Award for Best Original Song, “Richard’s Window”/The Other Side of the Mountain
- Academy Award nomination – Academy Award for Best Original Song – “Ready to Take a Chance Again”/Foul Play
- Golden Globe Awards – Golden Globe Award for Best Original Score, "The Other Side of the Mountain”
- Golden Globe Nomination – Best Song, “Richard’s Window”/The Other Side of the Mountain
- Golden Globe Nomination – Best Song, “Ready to Take a Chance Again”/Foul Play
- Grammy Nomination – Best Soundtrack for a film, “Nine to Five”
- Society of Composers and Lyricists, “Ambassador’s Award” for Life Achievement
- Bronx Walk of Fame, inducted 2008
- Smithsonian Museum permanent exhibit, inducted 2011
- Middleburg Film Festival - Legacy Composer Award, 2021
