= The Last Married Couple in America =

1980 film by Gilbert Cates

- Directed by: Gilbert Cates
- Written by: John Herman Shaner
- Produced by: Edward S. Feldman; John Herman Shaner
- Starring: George Segal; Natalie Wood; Richard Benjamin; Valerie Harper; Dom DeLuise; Bob Dishy
- Cinematography: Gerald Hirschfeld
- Edited by: Sidney Katz
- Music by: Charles Fox
- Distributed by: Universal Pictures
- Release date: February 8, 1980
- Running time: 104 minutes
- Country: United States
- Language: English
- Box office: $12.8 million

The Last Married Couple in America is a 1980 comedy film released in the US.

It was directed by Gilbert Cates, whose most successful film Oh, God! Book II, was released in the same year. The film starred George Segal and Natalie Wood as a California couple in the late 1970s struggling to maintain their "happily married" status as all their friends begin to get divorces and seem to be caught up in the decadence of the sexual revolution and the "ME" era. This is the last completed theatrical release Natalie Wood made before her death in 1981.

== Plot ==
Life is going along smoothly for Jeff and Mari Thompson but not for any other couple they know, or so it seems. Everyone they know is getting divorced.

Their life is disrupted when Mari's old college friend, Barbara, comes into it and begins a fling with Jeff, which causes Mari to contemplate an affair of her own.

== Music ==
The theme song to this film is "We Could Have It All," sung by Maureen McGovern. The song became a hit on the adult contemporary charts of Canada (#6) and the U.S. (#16). It was written by Charles Fox and Norman Gimbel. Also featured on the soundtrack is Denise LaSalle's "I'm Trippin' on You", which was released as a single in 1981.

== Cast ==
- George Segal as Jeff Thompson
- Natalie Wood as Mari Thompson
- Richard Benjamin as Marv
- Valerie Harper as Barbara
- Bob Dishy as Howard
- Arlene Golonka as Sally
- Dom DeLuise as Walter
- Allan Arbus as Al
- Priscilla Barnes as Helena
- Catherine Hickland as Rebecca
- Sondra Currie as Lainy
- Oliver Clark as Max Dryden

== Box office ==
Upon release, the film was disappointing at the box office.
