= Maureen McGovern =

American singer and actress (born 1949)

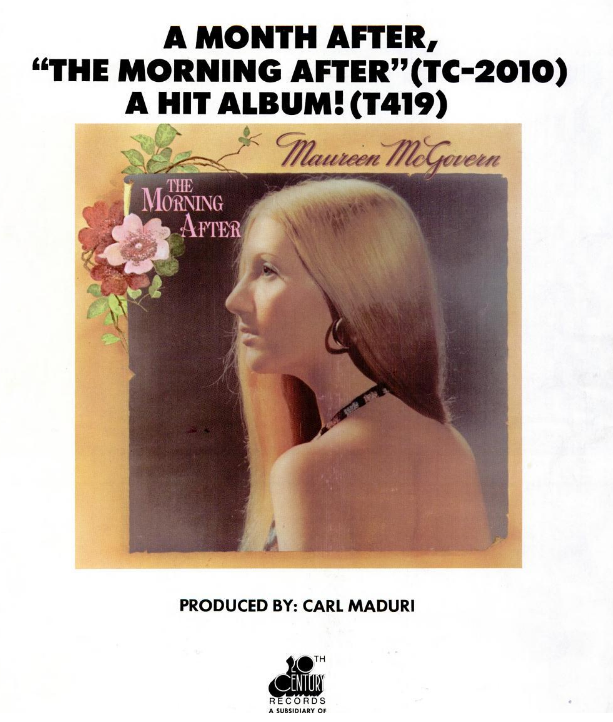
- Ad for the album The Morning After (1973)

Background information
- Born: Maureen Therese McGovern; July 27, 1949 (age 77); Youngstown, Ohio, U.S.
- Genres: Broadway; pop
- Occupations: Singer; actress
- Years active: 1967–2022 (as performer)
- Labels: 20th Century Fox; Columbia; RCA Victor; Sterling

Maureen Therese McGovern (born July 27, 1949) is an American singer and Broadway actress, well known for her renditions of the songs "The Morning After" from the 1972 film The Poseidon Adventure; "We May Never Love Like This Again" from The Towering Inferno in 1974; and her No. 1 Billboard adult contemporary hit "Different Worlds", the theme song from the television series Angie. She performed on Broadway in The Pirates of Penzance, Nine, The Threepenny Opera, and Little Women.

== Biography ==
=== Early life ===
McGovern was born in Youngstown, Ohio, United States, on July 27, 1949, the daughter of James Terrence McGovern and Mary Rita (née Welsh). She has Irish ancestry. As a child, McGovern would listen to her father's singing quartet rehearse in their home. She was told by her elders that she began singing at the age of three, and would sometimes sing herself to sleep with things she heard on the radio. She decided at age eight that she wanted to be a professional singer. Her influences include Barbra Streisand, Judy Collins, and Joni Mitchell.

=== Early work and breakthrough recording ===
After graduating from Boardman High School in 1967, she worked as a secretary and performed part-time as a singer for a local folk band called Sweet Rain. Her singing caught the attention of Russ Regan, then head of 20th Century Records, subsidiary of 20th Century-Fox, in 1972 when he heard a demo record she had recorded. At the time, Regan was searching for a singer to record "The Morning After" (the theme from The Poseidon Adventure) for release as a record. He hired McGovern sight unseen to record the song, which resulted in her contracting with 20th Century Records. After it won an Oscar for Best Original Song, "The Morning After" scored well on the popular chart, reaching No. 1 during 1973. It sold over one million copies and was awarded a gold disc by the R.I.A.A. in August 1973. Following the success of "The Morning After", she received a Grammy Award nomination in 1974 for 'Best New Artist'.

During 1974, she recorded two movie themes: "We May Never Love Like This Again" from the disaster film The Towering Inferno, in which she made a short appearance when she is seen singing the song as the evening's entertainment, and "Wherever Love Takes Me" from the British disaster film Gold. The former won an Oscar (though it was only a minor pop hit), and the latter received an Oscar nomination.

In 1976, she recorded her cover version of "The Continental", the very first Oscar-winning track for Best Original Song. It proved to be her only hit on the UK Singles Chart, where it peaked at No. 16.

=== Subsequent challenges ===
McGovern's contract with 20th Century ended during 1976. Her career declined and so did her finances. In an interview on BBC Woman's Hour on May 18, 2009, McGovern stated that exorbitant fees charged by her manager (40%) together with her band being on a full-time salary, whether she was performing or not, were the cause of her perilous financial state. Ready to begin her life over again, she moved to Marina del Rey and took a secretarial job under an assumed name, Glenda Schwartz. Nevertheless, she was still in demand occasionally for international live concerts. Her career improved when McGovern was asked to record a version of "Can You Read My Mind", the love theme from 1978's Superman, which was not recorded for the film. The single achieved minor success on the pop chart. Toward the end of the decade, McGovern recorded "Different Worlds", the theme from the ABC-TV sitcom Angie. The song, her only other Top 40 pop single aside from "The Morning After", soared to No. 18 on the Billboard Hot 100 during 1979 and hit at No. 1 on the Adult Contemporary chart. In 1980, McGovern made a brief appearance as Sister Angelina, the singing nun, in the comedy-disaster movie Airplane!

=== Broadway career and return to music ===
At the beginning of the 1980s, McGovern gave up singing movie themes to begin a career on Broadway (her first foray into acting). During 1981, she made her Broadway debut as Mabel in a revival of Gilbert & Sullivan's musical The Pirates of Penzance, taking over from fellow 1970s popular singer Linda Ronstadt. She then performed in two productions with the Pittsburgh Civic Light Opera: The Sound of Music (1981; as Maria) and South Pacific (1982; as Nellie Forbush). She returned to Broadway in 1982 to replace Karen Akers in Nine starring alongside Raul Julia. She continued her theatrical career throughout the 1980s and originated the role of Mary in the Off-Broadway production of Brownstone in 1985. In 2005 she originated the role of Marmee in Little Women The Musical.

She slowly returned to music during the mid-1980s, contributing songs to musical soundtracks and recording for various-artist compilations. She also returned to touring and performing in concerts and began establishing herself as a nightclub and cabaret performer. Starting in 1987, she released three albums for CBS in three years: Another Woman in Love (a voice/piano album), State of the Heart (a fully orchestrated album), and Naughty Baby (recorded live on November 20, 1988, Studio A at Clinton Recording Studios, New York City, it features an early first recording of a lost Gershwin song, "A Corner of Heaven With You" (written ca. 1917). Naughty Baby was released in 1989 coinciding with McGovern's Gershwin concert at Carnegie Hall.

=== Later career ===
From the 1990s into the 21st century, McGovern continued her careers in musical theatre, performing in concerts, and recording albums, and she occasionally made guest appearances on television. Other recordings include Baby I'm Yours (1992), a collection of her favorite songs from 1955 to 1970, and Out of This World (1996), a collection of songs by Harold Arlen. She was nominated twice for a Grammy, for her albums The Music Never Ends (1997), a collection of songs by Alan & Marilyn Bergman, and The Pleasure of His Company (1998), another voice/piano album. McGovern voiced the character of Rachel in the animated film Joseph: King of Dreams.

In 2003, Out of This World and The Music Never Ends were re-released by Fynsworth Alley Records; both albums included bonus tracks, the former two, and the latter three.

In 2005, McGovern returned to the Broadway stage as Marmee opposite Sutton Foster's Jo in the musical adaptation of Louisa May Alcott's Little Women. With negative reviews, it ended quickly, but McGovern reprised her role for the successful subsequent national tour.

She continued to appear in concert as a headliner and as a guest with symphony orchestras around the country. A Long and Winding Road, released on the PS Classics label, covers singer–songwriters of the 1960s including Paul Simon, Joni Mitchell, Lennon–McCartney, and Randy Newman. She performed a concert act based on this material at the Metropolitan Room in New York City, the Rrazz Room in San Francisco, and for the Huntington Theatre Company in Boston.

McGovern continues her work with the Muscular Dystrophy Association, and appeared regularly on The Jerry Lewis MDA Labor Day Telethon through 2014.

She created, along with Philip Himberg, a one-woman biographical musical Carry It On which premiered at Geva Theatre Center October 12 – November 14, 2010.

In 2012, she was listed as a guest star with The Fabulous Palm Springs Follies at the Plaza Theatre in Palm Springs, California.

McGovern was scheduled to headline the North Coast Men's Chorus 30th Anniversary Concert on March 24, 2018, at the KeyBank State Theatre in Cleveland, Ohio.

=== Retirement from performing ===
In 2021, McGovern was diagnosed with posterior cortical atrophy, which is thought to be a form of Alzheimer's disease. She publicly announced her diagnosis the following year, saying she would no longer perform in concert, but planned to continue working on musical projects for children, and advocating for musical therapy. As of 2022, she lives at a retirement community in Columbus, Ohio.

== Filmography ==
=== Film ===
Directed features
Year	Title	Note	Ref.
1974	The Towering Inferno	Singer at Party	Voice, uncredited
1980	Airplane!	Nun	Voice
1982	Airplane II: The Sequel	Nun	Voice, Uncredited
1982	Fun & Games	Herself	Voice
1984	A Christmas Dream	Herself	Voice: Television Movie
1996	Champions on Ice	Herself	Voice: Television Movie
1997	Happy Birthday, George Gershwin!	Herself	Voice: Television Movie
2000	Joseph: King of Dreams	Rachel	Voice, direct-to-video
2001	The Cure for Bedroom	Waitress	Voice

=== Television ===
Year	Title	Note	Ref.
1987	The Tracey Ullman Show	Mother	Voice: 1 episode
1996–1997	Duckman: Private Dick/Family Man	Ajax	Voice: 3 episodes
1998	Pacific Blue	Dr. Berg	Voice: 1 episode
1999	Beyond Belief: Fact or Fiction	Mrs. Hatchagain	Voice: 1 episode (segment "Damsel")
2001	American Masters	Herself	Voice: 1 episode
2009	Fan des années 80	Nun	Voice: 1 episode
2009	Lifestyle Magazine (TV series)	Herself	Voice: 1 episode
1979–2011	Jerry Lewis MDA Labor Day Telethon	Herself, Performer, and Co-host	Voice: 22 episodes

== Discography ==
=== Studio albums ===
- 1973: The Morning After
- 1974: Nice to Be Around
- 1975: Academy Award Performance: And the Envelope, Please
- 1979: Maureen McGovern
- 1987: Another Woman in Love
- 1988: State of the Heart
- 1990: Christmas With Maureen McGovern
- 1992: Baby I'm Yours
- 1996: Out of This World (reissued in 2003 with two bonus tracks)
- 1997: The Music Never Ends (reissued in 2003 with three bonus tracks)
- 1998: The Pleasure of His Company
- 2003: Works of Heart
- 2008: A Long and Winding Road
- 2016: You Raise Me Up: A Spiritual Journey

=== Live albums ===
- 1989: Naughty Baby

=== Compilations ===
- 1990: Greatest Hits
- 2005: 20th Century Masters – The Millennium Collection: The Best of Maureen McGovern

=== Guest appearances ===
- 1985: Placido Domingo: Save Your Nights For Me
- 1986: Greatest Hits Of The 1900's - McGovern sings the coloratura aria Glitter and Be Gay from Candide and a soprano vocalise arrangement of Pavane by Gabriel Faure
- 1987: Of Thee I Sing - McGovern sings the roles of Mary Turner
- 1991: David Shire – At The Movies - McGovern sings four film songs composed by Shire
- 1993: Amen! A Gospel Celebration - McGovern sings Amazing Grace and From a Distance
- 1995: A Prairie Home Christmas
- 2001: The Fantasticks In Jazz - McGovern sings Soon It's Gonna Rain
- 2005: Little Women: Original Broadway Cast Recording

=== Singles ===
Year	Title	Chart positions						Album
Year	Title	US	US AC	AUS	CAN	CAN AC	UK	Album
1973	"The Morning After"	1	6	1	4	3	—	The Morning After
1973	"I Won't Last a Day Without You"	89	14	—	—	12	—	The Morning After
1974	"Nice to Be Around"	101	28	—	88	8	—	Nice to Be Around
1974	"Give Me a Reason to Be Gone"	71	12	—	50	16	—	Nice to Be Around
1974	"We May Never Love Like This Again"	83	20	5	—	—	—	Academy Award Performance
1975	"Even Better Than I Know Myself"	—	—	65	—	—	—	Non-album singles
1975	"Love Songs Are Getting Harder to Sing"	—	24	—	—	—	—	Non-album singles
1976	"The Continental"	—	—	—	—	—	16	Academy Award Performance
1978	"Can You Read My Mind"	52	5	—	68	40	—	Maureen McGovern
1978	"Very Special Love"	—	—	—	—	—	—	Maureen McGovern
1979	"Different Worlds"	18	1	—	48	1	—	Maureen McGovern
1979	"Can't Take My Eyes Off You"	—	27	—	—	5	—	Maureen McGovern
1980	"We Could Have It All"	—	16	—	—	6	—	Non-album singles
1980	"Bottom Line"	—	—	—	—	—	—	Non-album singles
1981	"Halfway Home"	—	24	—	—	—	—	Non-album singles
1985	"A Love Until the End of Time" (with Placido Domingo)	—	—	54	—	—	—	Non-album singles
1987	"I Could Have Been a Sailor"	—	—	—	—	—	—	Another Woman in Love
1988	"The Same Moon"	—	—	—	—	—	—	State of the Heart
1992	"You Belong to Me"	—	—	—	—	—	—	Baby I'm Yours
1996	"Any Place I Hang My Hat Is Home"	—	—	—	—	—	—	Out of This World

=== Awards and nominations ===
Award	Category	Nominee(s)	Result	Ref.
Grammy Awards - 1999	Best New Artist and Best Traditional Pop Vocal Performance	Album The Pleasure of His Company	Nominated	
47th Academy Awards -1974	Best Song	"Wherever Love Takes Me"; Elmer Bernstein (music); Don Black (lyrics)	Nominated	
