= We May Never Love Like This Again =

- Side A of the New Zealand single

Single by Maureen McGovern

from the album The Towering Inferno
- B-side: "Wherever Love Takes Me"
- Released: January 1975
- Length: 2:10
- Label: 20th Century
- Songwriter(s): Al Kasha; Joel Hirschhorn
- Producer(s): Carl Maduri

Maureen McGovern singles chronology
"Give Me a Reason to Be Gone" (1974)	"We May Never Love Like This Again" (1975)	"Even Better Than I Know Myself" (1975)

"We May Never Love Like This Again" is a song written by Al Kasha and Joel Hirschhorn for the 1974 disaster film The Towering Inferno. It won the Academy Award for Best Original Song, and was performed by Maureen McGovern both for the film score and, briefly, in the film itself with McGovern portraying a singer.

Her recording was issued as a single along with her rendition of "Wherever Love Takes Me", a song from the film Gold, which would compete with "We May Never Love Like This Again" for the Best Song Oscar, serving as B-side. "We May Never Love Like This Again" reached #83 on the Billboard Hot 100, and the single was a top-five hit in Australia.

== Background ==
McGovern had previously performed Kasha and Hirschhorn's song "The Morning After" for The Poseidon Adventure, which also won the Academy Award for Best Original Song two years prior. Due to her associations with two Oscar-winning songs, McGovern recorded Academy Award Performance: And the Envelope, Please an album comprising Oscar-winning songs, which included both "The Morning After" and "We May Never Love Like This Again".

Hollywood composer John Williams wrote the original music score for the film, and interpolated the tune of the song into the underscore of the movie. The actual 1974 song recording for the album (subsequently released as a single) was produced by Carl Maduri for Belkin-Maduri Productions. It was arranged by Joe Hudson and was engineered by Arnie Rosenberg.

== Chart performance ==
=== Weekly charts ===
Chart (1975)	Peak position
Australia (Kent Music Report)	5
Canada Adult Contemporary	22
U.S. Billboard Hot 100	83
U.S. Billboard Easy Listening	20

=== Year-end charts ===
Chart (1975)	Peak position
Australia (Kent Music Report)	55
