= Nice to Be Around (Maureen McGovern album) =

Studio album by Maureen McGovern
- Released: 1974
- Genre: Pop
- Label: 20th Century
- Producer: Carl Maduri

Maureen McGovern chronology
The Morning After (1973)	Nice to Be Around (1974)	Academy Award Performance (1975)

Nice to Be Around is Maureen McGovern's second studio album, released in 1974. The title track was the theme from the 1973 film Cinderella Liberty. McGovern composed the music for the songs "All I Want (All I Need)," "Love Knots," "Little Boys & Men" (dedicated to Mark Christopher Axelson), and "Memory."

== Track listing ==
Side 1
No.	Title	Writer(s)	Length
1.	"Nice to Be Around" (from the motion picture Cinderella Liberty)	John Williams, Paul Williams	2:27
2.	"Give Me a Reason to Be Gone"	Marie Cain	2:45
3.	"Where Did We Go Wrong"	Ron Miller, Tom Baird	3:22
4.	"All I Want (All I Need)"	Maureen McGovern, Jim Kennedy	3:47
5.	"Like a Sunday Morning"	Joel Diamond, A. Kenneth	3:10

Side 2
No.	Title	Writer(s)	Length
1.	"Love Knots"	Maureen McGovern, Ron Barron	3:30
2.	"Everybody Wants to Call You Sweetheart"	Randy Edelman	2:50
3.	"Little Boys & Men"	Maureen McGovern, Jim Kennedy	3:30
4.	"Memory"	Maureen McGovern, Jim Kennedy	3:20
5.	"Put a Little Love Away"	Dennis Lambert, Brian Potter	3:00

== Album credits ==
- Produced by: Carl Maduri for Belkin-Maduri Productions
- Engineer: Arnie Rosenberg
- Assistant engineer: John Nebe
- "Nice to Be Around" and "Little Boys & Men" arranged by: Jimmie Haskell
- "Give Me a Reason to Be Gone," "Where Did We Go Wrong," "Like a Sunday Morning" and "Put a Little Love Away" arranged by: Gene Page
- "All I Want (All I Need)," "Love Knots" and "Memory" arranged and conducted by: Gary Kekel
- "Nice to Be Around," "Like a Sunday Morning" and "Little Boys & Men" conducted by: Sid Sharp
- "Give Me a Reason to Be Gone," "Where Did We Go Wrong," "Like a Sunday Morning" and "Put a Little Love Away" conducted by: Bob Hill
- "Everybody Wants to Call You Sweetheart" arranged and conducted by: Lee Bush
