= Al Kasha =

American songwriter (1937–2020)

Background information
- Born: Alfred Kasha; January 22, 1937; New York City, U.S.
- Died: September 14, 2020 (aged 83) Los Angeles, California, U.S.
- Genres: Popular music
- Occupation: Songwriter
- Website: alkasha.com

Alfred Kasha (January 22, 1937 – September 14, 2020) was an American songwriter, whose songs include "The Morning After" from The Poseidon Adventure and "We May Never Love Like This Again" from The Towering Inferno.

== Life ==
Kasha started songwriting and producing at a young age and was hired as a producer at Columbia Records aged 22. He worked at the Brill Building in 1959 alongside writers and artists like Carole King, Neil Sedaka, Barry Mann, Cynthia Weil, Jerry Leiber, Mike Stoller, Burt Bacharach, Hal David, and Neil Diamond. He worked with many great artists such as Aretha Franklin ("Operation Heartbreak" and "Rock-a-Bye Your Baby with a Dixie Melody"), Neil Diamond, Donna Summer ("I'm A Fire"), Charles Aznavour ("Dance In The Old Fashioned Way"), Bobby Darin ("Irresistible You"), and Jackie Wilson ("I'm Coming on Back To You," "My Empty Arms," "Forever And A Day," "Each Night I Dream Of You," "Lonely Life," and "Sing And Tell The Blues So Long"). Kasha is most noted for his years of collaboration with songwriter Joel Hirschhorn. The two wrote and collaborated on many nominated and award-winning songs for many music groups, movies, and musicals. The Peppermint Rainbow's "Will You Be Staying After Sunday" is just one example of the many songs they wrote for groups during their time.

== Accolades ==
The songwriting duo twice won the Academy Award for Best Original Song: for "The Morning After" from The Poseidon Adventure in 1973 and "We May Never Love Like This Again" from The Towering Inferno in 1975, both made famous by Maureen McGovern. They also received two more Academy Award nominations for their work in the 1977 Disney film Pete's Dragon, for Best Song Score as well as Best Song ("Candle On The Water," sung by Helen Reddy).

Along with Hirschhorn, Kasha also received two Tony nominations (one for Copperfield and the other for Seven Brides for Seven Brothers), two Grammy nominations, an Emmy, four Golden Globe nominations, and a People's Choice Award. They also composed the theme song to the short-lived 1990s game show The Challengers.

== Later years ==
Kasha wrote four books: If They Ask You Can Write A Song, Notes On Broadway, his autobiographies, Reaching The Morning After, which was published in 1985, and "Jesus, Hollywood and me", which was published in 1995.

Kasha was married to Ceil Kasha and had a daughter, Dana Kasha-Cohen. He suffered with Parkinson's disease in his latter years.

Kasha died on September 14, 2020, at the age of 83.

== Discography ==
=== Singles ===
- "Sing (And Tell The Blues "So Long")" Sid Wyche, Al Kasha / "One Of Them" Al Kasha, Hank Hunter 1960
