= Joel Hirschhorn =

American songwriter (1937–2005)

Joel Hirschhorn (December 18, 1937 – September 18, 2005) was an American songwriter. He won the Academy Award for Best Original Song on two occasions. He also wrote songs for a number of musicians, including Elvis Presley and Roy Orbison. Hirschhorn was born in the Bronx and attended the High School of Performing Arts in Manhattan. After graduating, Hirschhorn became a regular performer on New York's nightclub circuit, both as a solo singer and as a member of the rock & roll band, The Highlighters.

During the mid-1960s, Hirschhorn branched out into writing film soundtracks. The first score he wrote was for Who Killed Teddy Bear? (1965), which was directed by his friend Joseph Cates. He worked with Cates again the following year in The Fat Spy. However, the film was received so badly that Hirschhorn struggled to find work in Hollywood for years afterwards.

Hirschhorn, along with songwriting partner Al Kasha, did not work on another film until 1970's The Cheyenne Social Club, which was directed by Gene Kelly. It was the pair's next effort, for The Poseidon Adventure (1972), that really made their name. "The Morning After", a song they wrote in a single evening, won them their first Oscar and also topped the Billboard chart.

The Towering Inferno (1974) provided Hirschhorn and Kasha with their second Oscars, this time for the "We May Never Love Like This Again". Following this success, the pair received Oscar nominations for the song "Candle on the Water" from Disney’s Pete's Dragon (1977).

Their final collaboration was Rescue Me (1992).

The pair also worked together on Broadway musicals, and they were nominated for the Tony Award for Best Original Score for both Copperfield and Seven Brides for Seven Brothers.

Late in his career, Hirschhorn wrote The Complete Idiot's Guide to Songwriting, which was first published in 2001.
