= The Morning After (Maureen McGovern song) =

- Side A of the US single

Single by Maureen McGovern

from the album The Morning After
- B-side: "Midnight Storm"
- Released: May 1973
- Genre: Pop
- Length: 2:14
- Label: 20th Century
- Songwriters: Joel Hirschhorn; Al Kasha
- Producer: Carl Maduri

Maureen McGovern singles chronology
"The Morning After" (1973)	"I Won't Last a Day Without You" (1973)

"The Morning After" is a song written by Al Kasha and Joel Hirschhorn for the 1972 film The Poseidon Adventure, which won Best Original Song at the 45th Academy Awards. Following this success, Maureen McGovern recorded a single version that became a No. 1 hit in the US for two weeks during August 1973, with Gold record sales. Billboard ranked it as the No. 28 song for 1973.

== Beginnings ==
The song was written in March 1972 by 20th Century Fox songwriters Al Kasha and Joel Hirschhorn, who were asked to write the love theme for The Poseidon Adventure in one night. The finished product was called "Why Must There Be a Morning After?" but changes by the record label resulted in the more optimistic lyric "there's got to be a morning after".

In the film the song is performed by the character of Nonnie, played by Carol Lynley, but actually sung by the vocal double Renee Armand. It appears twice: during a warm-up rehearsal and then later during the New Year's Eve party early in the film, before the passengers must escape the sinking wreck. The title appears in the end credits as "The Song from The Poseidon Adventure".

== Personnel ==
- Maureen McGovern - lead and backing vocals
- Joe Hudson - arrangement, conductor
- Bob Fraser - guitar
- Bill Severance - drums, percussion

== Chart performance ==
=== Weekly charts ===
Chart (1973)	Peak position
Argentina	5
Australia (Kent Music Report)	1
Australia (Go Set)	2
Canada (RPM) AC / "Pop Music Playlist"	3
Canada (RPM) Top Singles	4
South Africa (Springbok)	4
US Billboard Hot 100	1
US Billboard Adult Contemporary	6

=== Year-end charts ===
Chart (1973)	Rank
Australia Kent Music Report	16
Australia Go Set	17
Canada Top Singles	33
US Billboard Hot 100	28

== Certifications ==
Region	Certification	Certified units/sales
Australia (ARIA)	Gold	50,000^{^}
United States (RIAA)	Gold	1,000,000^{^}
^{^} Shipments figures based on certification alone.

== See also ==
- List of Billboard Hot 100 number-one singles of 1973
- List of number-one singles in Australia during the 1970s
