= A Group Called Smith =

Studio album by Smith
- Released: July 1969
- Recorded: 1969
- Genre: Pop rock; soul
- Length: 50:59 (reissue)
- Label: Dunhill (original); Varese Vintage (1994 reissue)
- Producer: Steve Barri & Joel Sill

Smith chronology
A Group Called Smith (1969)	Minus-Plus (1970)

A Group Called Smith is the debut album by American rock band Smith, released in 1969. It contains their biggest hit, a cover version of the Shirelles' song, "Baby, It's You", which peaked at No. 5 on the Billboard Hot 100 on November 1, 1969 (spending a total of 15 weeks on the chart). "Baby, It's You" was used in Quentin Tarantino's 2007 film, Death Proof.

The album reached No. 17 on the Billboard 200 chart.

== Track listing ==
Titles and songwriting credits from original album sleeve and AllMusic.

1. "Let's Get Together" (Chet Powers) – 3:32
2. "I Don't Believe (I Believe)" (Jeffrey Thomas) – 3:41
3. "Tell Him No" (Rod Argent) – 3:27
4. "Who Do You Love" (Bo Diddley) – 2:57
5. "Baby, It's You" (Burt Bacharach/Mack David/Luther Dixon (credited as Barney Williams)) – 3:27
6. "Last Time" (Mick Jagger/Keith Richards) – 5:38
7. "I Just Want to Make Love to You" (Willie Dixon) – 2:38
8. "Mojaleskey Ridge" (Harvey Price/Joel Sill/Dan Walsh) – 2:32
9. "Let's Spend the Night Together" (Mick Jagger/Keith Richards)– 3:54
10. "I'll Hold Out My Hand" (Al Gorgoni/Chip Taylor) – 3:06

== 1994 reissue ==
1. "Let's Get Together" (Chet Powers) – 3:32
2. "I Don't Believe (I Believe)" (Jeffrey Thomas) – 3:41
3. "Tell Him No" (Rod Argent) – 3:27
4. "Who Do You Love" (Bo Diddley) – 2:57
5. "Baby, It's You" (Burt Bacharach/Mack David/Luther Dixon (credited as Barney Williams)) – 3:27
6. "Last Time" (Mick Jagger/Keith Richards) – 5:38
7. "I Just Want to Make Love to You" (Willie Dixon) – 2:38
8. "Mojaleskey Ridge" (Harvey Price/Joel Sill/Dan Walsh) – 2:32
9. "Let's Spend the Night Together" (Mick Jagger/Keith Richards) – 3:54
10. "I'll Hold Out My Hand" (Al Gorgoni/Chip Taylor) – 3:06
11. "The Weight (Robbie Robertson) – (The Band cover, originally released on the Easy Rider soundtrack) – 4:32
12. "Take a Look Around" (Jerry Carter/Rick Cliburn) – 2:54
13. "What Am I Gonna Do" (Carole King/Toni Stern) – (also performed by Kenny Rogers) – 2:55
14. "Gonna Be Alright Now" (Dennis Lambert/Brian Potter) – (Gayle McCormick solo single) – 2:50
15. "It's a Cryin' Shame" (Dennis Lambert/Brian Potter) – (Gayle McCormick solo single) – 2:49

== Singles chart positions ==
Billboard Hot 100 –

- "What Am I Gonna Do" - #73
- "Take a Look Around" - #43
- "Baby It's You" - #5
