= Glades =

Glades may refer to:

- Glade (geography)
- Glades County, Florida
- Glades (Florida), a region of Florida
- Everglades
- Glades, Pennsylvania

== In music ==
- Glades (band), an Australian indie band formed in 2015.

== In sports ==
- Green Mountain Glades, a youth hockey team in Vermont

== See also ==
- The Glades (disambiguation)
- Glade (disambiguation)
