= To Love You =

To Love You may refer to:

- To Love You (song), a 1969 single by Country Store
- To Love You (album), a 2018 album by Glades
