= This Heart =

"This Heart" may refer to:

- "This Heart" (Gene Redding song), a 1974 song by Gene Redding
- "This Heart" (Sweethearts of the Rodeo song), a 1990 song by Sweethearts of the Rodeo
- "This Heart" (Corey Kent song), a 2024 song by Corey Kent
- Yeh Dil (lit. 'This Heart'), a 2003 Indian Hindi-language film

== See also ==
- Yeh Dil Maange More (disambiguation) (lit. 'This Heart Wants More')
