= Glade =

Glade may refer to:

== Places in the United States ==
- Glade, Kansas, a city in Phillips County
- Glade, Ohio, an unincorporated community in Jackson County
- Glades County, Florida, in south central Florida
- Glade Spring, Virginia, a town in Washington County
- Glade Township, Warren County, Pennsylvania

== Other uses ==
- Glades (band), an Australian indie group formed in 2015
- Glade (brand), air freshener products
- Glade (geography), open area in woodland, synonym for "clearing"
- Glade Festival, an annual electronic dance music festival in England
- Glade Interface Designer, a GUI designer for GTK+ and GNOME
- Glade skiing, skiing amongst trees
- The Glade (magazine), a UK archery quarterly
- Up from the Ashes (song), song by rapper Kanye West

== See also ==
- The Glades (disambiguation)
