= United (Commodores album) =

Studio album by Commodores
- Released: October 7, 1986
- Recorded: 1986
- Studios: Motown Recording Studios (Los Angeles, California); Conway Studios and Soundcastle (Hollywood, California)
- Genres: Funk; soul; R&B
- Length: 38:22
- Label: Polydor
- Producers: Dennis Lambert; Jeremy Smith; Greg Mathieson; James Anthony Carmichael; William King; Milan Williams

Commodores chronology
The Very Best Of (1985)	United (1986)	Rock Solid (1988)

Professional ratings
Review scores
Source	Rating
Allmusic	2/5 stars
Philadelphia Inquirer	2/4 stars

United is the twelfth studio album by the Commodores, released on October 7, 1986, on Polydor Records.

== Overview ==
The album reached number 17 on the Billboard Top R&B Albums chart. "Goin' to the Bank" climbed to number two on Billboard Hot R&B Singles chart. "Take It from Me" peaked at No. 38 on the US Billboard R&B singles chart. Another single, "United in Love", peaked at No. 22 on the US Billboard Adult Contemporary chart.

=== Covers ===
The Commodores covered Peabo Bryson's "Let's Apologize" from his 1985 studio album Take No Prisoners.

== Critical reception ==
Ken Tucker of the Philadelphia Inquirer claimed most of "the time, the album succumbs to the usual flaw of veteran vocal groups - sophisticated technique applied to mediocre material." Alex Henderson of Allmusic also found "An abundance of studio musicians and outside songwriters are employed on this high-tech, pop-minded urban contemporary outing, and not surprisingly, the Commodores no longer sound distinctive...United has its moments, but it pales in comparison to 1970s classics like Movin' On, Caught in the Act, and Hot on the Tracks." Lennox Samuels of the Dallas Morning News noted "the group, now fronted by William "Clyde' Orange and J.D. Nicholas, needs good material in order to make a good record. The Commodores don't have that here. A variety of songwriters provide mostly B-grade songs, with the inevitable results."

== Track listing ==
No.	Title	Writer(s)	Length
1.	"Goin' to the Bank"	Andy Goldmark, Dennis Lambert, Franne Golde	4:19
2.	"Take It from Me"	Andy Goldmark, Dennis Lambert, Franne Golde	4:00
3.	"United in Love"	Pam Reswick, Steve Werfel	4:27
4.	"Can't Dance All Night"	Jimmy Scott, Richard Feldman	3:58
5.	"You're the Only Woman I Need"	Mick Leeson, Peter Vale	4:43
6.	"Land of the Dreamer"	Dennis Lambert, J.D. Nicholas, Sheldon Reynolds	4:27
7.	"Talk to Me"	Harold Hudson, Shirley King, William King	4:44
8.	"I Wanna Rock You"	Karen "K-Dean" Cover, Milan Williams	5:24
9.	"Let's Apologize"	Billy Steinberg, Gary Usher, Tom Kelly	3:50
10.	"Serious Love"	Van Ross Redding, Harold Hudson, Walter Orange	4:02

== Personnel ==
Commodores

- William King – keyboards
- Milan Williams – keyboards
- Walter Orange – drums, lead vocals (1, 2, 4, 5, 9, 10), backing vocals (4)
- J.D. Nicholas – rap (1), lead vocals (2–4, 6–9), backing vocals (3, 4, 6)

Additional musicians

- Claude Gaudette – keyboards (1–4, 6), electronic programming (1–4, 6)
- Casey Young – special effects (1), keyboards (5, 9, 10), electronic programming (5, 9, 10)
- Greg Mathieson – keyboards (5, 10)
- John Barnes – synthesizers (7, 8)
- Michael Boddicker – synthesizers (7, 8)
- Harold Hudson – synthesizers (7, 8), backing vocals (7, 8)
- Sheldon Reynolds – guitars (1, 2, 6–8, 10), guitar synthesizer (6), backing vocals (6–8)
- Paul Jackson Jr. – guitars (3, 5, 9, 10)
- Dann Huff – guitars (4)
- Michael Thompson – guitars (9)
- Isaac Morris – drum overdubs (7)
- Lenny Castro – percussion (2)
- Paulinho da Costa – percussion (5, 7, 8, 10)
- Dave Koz – saxophone (2)
- Gary Herbig – saxophone solo (10)
- Siedah Garrett – backing vocals (1–3, 6), rap (1)
- Dennis Lambert – backing vocals (1, 2)
- Phil Perry – backing vocals (1, 2)
- Darryl Phinnessee – backing vocals (1, 2)
- Julia Tillman Waters – backing vocals (3, 9, 10)
- Maxine Willard Waters – backing vocals (3, 9, 10)
- Bill Champlin – backing vocals (5, 9, 10)
- Jason Scheff – backing vocals (9, 10)

Music arrangements

- Dennis Lambert – BGV arrangements (1–4)
- Claude Gaudette – arrangements (2–4, 6)
- J.D. Nicholas – BGV arrangements (4, 6)
- Walter Orange – BGV arrangements (4), arrangements (10)
- Sheldon Reynolds – arrangements (2, 6), BGV arrangements (6)
- Greg Mathieson – arrangements (5, 9, 10)
- Isaac Morris – arrangements (6)
- James Anthony Carmichael – arrangements (7, 8)
- Harold Hudson – arrangements (7), BGV arrangements (7)
- William King – arrangements (7), BGV arrangements (7)
- Milan Williams – arrangements (8), BGV arrangements (8)

== Production ==
- Commodores – associate executive producers
- Dennis Lambert – executive producer, producer (1–4, 6)
- Jeremy Smith – producer (1, 2, 6)
- Greg Mathieson – producer (5, 9, 10)
- James Anthony Carmichael – producer (7, 8)
- William King – producer (7)
- Lloyd Tolbert – assistant producer (7, 8)
- Milan Williams – producer (8)
- Marrianne Pellicci – production coordinator
- Kimberly C. Priestley – production assistant (7, 8)
- Bill Levy – art direction
- John Kosh – package design
- Chris Callis – photography
- Marietta A. Carter – make-up artist for cover photo
- Dan Cleary – management

Technical credits

- Stephen Marcussen – mastering at Precision Lacquer (Hollywood, California)
- Jeremy Smith – recording (1–3, 6), mixing (1–4, 6)
- Mick Guzauski – recording (5, 9, 10), mixing (5, 9, 10)
- Calvin Harris – recording (7, 8), mixing (7, 8)
- Paul Ericksen – assistant engineer (1, 2, 6), mixing (3, 4), recording (4)
- Bino Espinoza – additional recording (5, 10)
- Don Murray – additional recording (5, 10)
- Fred Law – additional recording (7, 8)
- Karen Siegel – assistant engineer (7, 8)

== Charts ==
=== Album ===
Charts
Year	US Pop	US R&B	SWI	NL	SWE	GER
1986	101	17	28	44	50	62
