= Are You Man Enough (Four Tops song) =

Single by Four Tops

from the album Shaft in Africa and Main Street People
- B-side: "Peace of Mind"
- Released: June 1973
- Genre: Funk, soul, Philadelphia soul
- Length: 2:10; 3:24 (album version)
- Label: ABC Records
- Songwriters: Dennis Lambert, Brian Potter
- Producers: Steve Barri, Lambert and Potter

Four Tops singles chronology
"Ain't No Woman (Like the One I've Got)" (1973)	"Are You Man Enough" (1973)	"Sweet Understanding Love" (1973)

"Are You Man Enough" is a 1973 hit song recorded by the Four Tops for the ABC Records label. It appeared as the second track on the soundtrack to the movie Shaft in Africa. It reached number 2 on the American R&B chart, number 15 on the American Billboard chart in 1973, and number 35 on the Canadian RPM magazine top singles chart. It was subsequently released on their 1973 album, Main Street People and used as the main theme for the film Shaft in Africa. The song was also featured in the 2007 comedy Superbad.
