= Two Divided by Love =

Single by The Grass Roots

from the album Move Along
- B-side: "Let It Go"
- Released: October 1971
- Studio: ABC, Los Angeles, California
- Genre: Soft rock
- Length: 2:42
- Label: ABC/Dunhill
- Songwriters: B. Potter, D. Lambert, M. Kupps
- Producer: Steve Barri

The Grass Roots singles chronology
"Sooner or Later" (1971)	"Two Divided by Love" (1971)	"Glory Bound" (1972)

"Two Divided by Love" is a 1971 hit song by The Grass Roots. It was the first single released from their sixth studio album, Move Along.

The song reached number 16 on the US Billboard Hot 100 and number 2 in Canada.

== Chart performance ==
=== Weekly charts ===
Chart (1971)	Peak position
Australia Kent Music Report	64
Canada RPM Top Singles	2
US Billboard Hot 100	16
US Billboard Easy Listening	37
US Cash Box Top 100	8
US Record World	11

=== Year-end charts ===
Chart (1971)	Rank
Canada	34

== Personnel ==
- Jimmie Haskell – horns arrangement
- Phil Kaye – engineering
