= Hard Core Poetry =

Studio album by Tavares
- Released: September 1974
- Studio: Sound Labs (Hollywood, California)
- Genre: R&B, soul
- Length: 34:25
- Label: Capitol
- Producer: Dennis Lambert, Brian Potter

Tavares chronology
Check It Out (1974)	Hard Core Poetry (1974)	In the City (1975)

Professional ratings
Review scores
Source	Rating
AllMusic	4.5/5 stars

Hard Core Poetry is the second studio album by American soul/R&B group Tavares, released in 1974 on the Capitol label.

== Commercial performance ==
The album peaked at No. 12 on the R&B albums chart. It also reached No. 68 on the Billboard 200. The album features the singles "Too Late", which peaked at No. 10 on the Hot Soul Singles chart and No. 59 on the Billboard Hot 100, Hall & Oates' "She's Gone", which charted at No. 1 on the Hot Soul Singles chart and No. 50 on the Billboard Hot 100, and "Remember What I Told You to Forget", which reached No. 4 on the Hot Soul Singles chart and No. 25 on the Billboard Hot 100.

== Track listing ==
All tracks are written by Dennis Lambert and Brian Potter, except where noted.

Side one
No.	Title	Writer(s)	Length
1.	"Someone to Go Home To"		3:15
2.	"She's Gone"	Daryl Hall, John Oates	3:38
3.	"My Ship"		3:26
4.	"Leave It Up to the Lady"		3:30
5.	"To Love You"		4:02

Side two
No.	Title	Length
6.	"Too Late"	4:26
7.	"Remember What I Told You to Forget"	4:10
8.	"What You Don't Know"	3:54
9.	"Hard Core Poetry"	4:23

== Personnel ==
Tavares

- Butch Tavares
- Chubby Tavares
- Pooch Tavares
- Ralph Tavares
- Tiny Tavares

with:

- Jeana Jackson – introductory narration on "To Love You"
- Michael Omartian – keyboards, arrangements, conductor
- Dennis Lambert – keyboards
- Wilton Felder, Scott Edwards – bass
- Ed Greene – drums
- Larry Carlton, Dean Parks, Ben Benay – guitar
- Gary Coleman, Brian Potter – percussion
- Sid Sharp – string concertmaster
- The Boogie Symphony – strings

Technical

- Joe Sidore – recording engineer
- Larkin Arnold – executive producer
- Roy Kohara – art direction
- Richard Rankin – cover photography

== Charts ==
Album

Chart (1974)	Peaks
U.S. Billboard Top LPs	121
U.S. Billboard Top Soul LPs	11

Singles

Year	Single	Peaks	
Year	Single	US	US R&B
1974	"Too Late"	59	10
1974	"She's Gone"	50	1
1975	"Remember What I Told You to Forget"/"My Ship"	25	4
