= Main Street People =

Studio album by The Four Tops
- Released: September 1973
- Studios: ABC, Los Angeles, California
- Genre: R&B
- Length: 40:35
- Labels: Dunhill; Probe
- Producers: Steve Barri, Dennis Lambert, Brian Potter

The Four Tops chronology
Keeper of the Castle (1972)	Main Street People (1973)	Meeting of the Minds (1974)

Singles from Main Street People
- 1. "It Won't Be the First Time" Released: 1972; 2. "Too Little, Too Late" Released: 1972; 3. "Sweet Understanding Love" Released: 1973; 4. "Main Street People" Released: August 1973; 5. "Are You Man Enough?" Released: May 1973

Professional ratings
Review scores
Source	Rating
AllMusic	4.5/5 stars

Main Street People is the thirteenth studio album by R&B group the Four Tops, released in 1973. It produced three singles, one of which, "Sweet Understanding Love" was the group's last top 40 single in the US for eight years. The album itself did not enjoy the commercial success the group was used to: 'Main Street People didn't do near what it should have done,' Abdul Fakir said in 1982, 'considering the quality of the material.'

== Track listing ==
All tracks composed by Dennis Lambert and Brian Potter; except where indicated

=== Side A ===
1. "Main Street People" (Intro) – (1:42)
2. "I Just Can't Get You Out of My Mind" – (3:59)
3. "It Won't Be The First Time" – (3:53)
4. "Sweet Understanding Love" (Ivy Jo Hunter, Renaldo Benson, Val Benson) – (3:00)
5. "Am I My Brother's Keeper" (Len Perry, Renaldo Benson, Val Benson) – (3:25)
6. "Are You Man Enough?" from the MGM movie Shaft in Africa – (3:24)

=== Side B ===
1. "Whenever There's Blue" – (5:20)
2. "Too Little, Too Late" – (3:20)
3. "Peace of Mind" (Abdul Fakir, Huey Davis, Renaldo Benson) – (4:28)
4. "One Woman Man" (Len Perry, Phil Townsend) – (4:39)
5. "Main Street People" (3:22)

== Personnel ==
- Levi Stubbs (Tracks 2–9 & 11), Lawrence Payton (Tracks 1, 5, 6 & 10), Renaldo "Obie" Benson (Tracks 5 & 9) Abdul “Duke” Fakir (Track 9) — lead vocals
- Renaldo "Obie" Benson, Abdul "Duke" Fakir — backing vocals
- Wilton Felder — bass
- Paul Humphrey — drums
- Ben Benay, David T. Walker, Joe Smith, Larry Carlton — guitars
- Chip Crawford, Dennis Lambert, Michael Omartian, Michael Wofford — keyboards
- Gary B.B. Coleman, King Ericsson — percussion
- Sidney Sharp – concertmaster
- Dennis Lambert, Don Hockett, Gil Askey, Jimmie Haskell – arrangements
