= Check It Out =

Check It Out may refer to:

== Television ==
- Check It Out! (Canadian TV series), a TV series starring Don Adams that aired on CTV in the 1980s
- Check It Out (British TV series), a youth TV series produced by Tyne Tees in the late 1970s
- Check It Out! with Dr. Steve Brule, an American TV series, starring John C. Reilly

== Music ==
- Check It Out (album), a 1973 album by Tavares, or its title track
- "Ch-Check It Out", a 2004 song by the Beastie Boys
- "Check It Out" (Grand Puba song), 1992
- "Check It Out" (John Mellencamp song), 1987
- "Check It Out" (will.i.am and Nicki Minaj song), 2010
- "Check It Out", a song by the Friends of Distinction from the album Whatever, 1970
- "Check It Out", a song by Bobby Womack from the album I Don't Know What the World Is Coming To, 1975
- "Check It Out", a song by Dynasty from the album Right Back at Cha!, 1982
- "Check It Out", a song by Fu-Schnickens and Dres from the album F.U. Don't Take It Personal, 1992
- "Check It Out", a song by Das EFX from the album Straight Up Sewaside, 1993
- "Check It Out", a song by Ron Contour and Factor Chandelier from Saffron, 2010
- "Check It Out", a song by Weeekly from Play Game: Holiday, 2021
- "Check It Out", a song by Bob Andy
