= Janet (song) =

Single by Commodores

from the album Nighshift
- B-side: "I'm In Love"
- Released: 1985
- Genre: R&B
- Length: 3:41
- Label: Motown
- Songwriter(s): Bobby Caldwell, Franne Golde, Paul Fox
- Producer(s): Dennis Lambert

Commodores singles chronology
"Animal Instinct" (1985)	"Janet" (1985)	"Goin' to the Bank" (1986)

"Janet" is a song by the group Commodores. It was released as the third single from their eleventh studio album, Nighshift, in 1985 by Motown Records. Janet peaked at No. 8 on the US Billboard Adult Contemporary chart.

== Critical reception ==
Paul Sexton of Record Mirror, in his review of the parent album, praised Janet saying "The (album's) highpoint and with any justice, the next 45, is the finely harmonised and polished 'Janet', co-written by my old hero Bobby Caldwell."

== Charts ==
Chart (1985)	Peak position
US Billboard Hot Black Singles	87
US Billboard Hot 100	65
US Billboard Adult Contemporary	8
Belgium Ultratop 50 Singles	29
