= Ain't No Woman (Like the One I've Got) =

- Side A of the New Zealand single

Single by Four Tops

from the album Keeper of the Castle
- B-side: "The Good Lord Knows"
- Released: January 1973
- Recorded: 1972
- Studio: ABC, Los Angeles, California
- Genre: Soul
- Length: 3:04
- Label: ABC/Dunhill
- Songwriters: Dennis Lambert; Brian Potter
- Producers: Dennis Lambert; Brian Potter; Steve Barri

Four Tops singles chronology
"Keeper of the Castle" (1972)	"Ain't No Woman (Like the One I've Got)" (1973)	"Are You Man Enough?" (1973)

"Ain't No Woman (Like the One I've Got)" is a song written by Dennis Lambert and Brian Potter, released as a single by the Four Tops on the ABC/Dunhill record label, from the album Keeper of the Castle. It peaked at number four on the U.S. Billboard Hot 100 the weeks of April 7 and 14, 1973, number one on the Cash Box Top 100 the latter of those two weeks, and became a gold record.

The song was originally recorded by the singing trio of Hamilton, Joe Frank & Reynolds and released on their 1972 album, Hallway Symphony.

The Four Tops' hit version was led by longtime singer Levi Stubbs, and included special co-lead spots by the other Tops, Lawrence Payton, Renaldo "Obie" Benson and Abdul "Duke" Fakir, in that respective order during the chorus. The words tell of the love a man feels for the woman with whom he is having a relationship.

It was the Four Tops' second single release on ABC after leaving Motown in 1972, and became their most successful post-Motown top 40 hit, reaching number four on the US Pop Singles chart. It was also another big success for the group on the US R&B Singles chart, where it peaked at number two.

Billboard said that "Levi Stubbs' lead vocal carries the quartet though a moving arrangement which has pop as well as soul overtones. Nice mellow strings give the tune soft lilt as the tale of fond affection unravels." Record World said "Levi Stubbs' voice still brings chills to the spine. Ain't no sound, like the one they've got!"

== Charts ==
=== Weekly charts ===
Chart (1973)	Peak position
Canada Top Singles (RPM)	11
US Billboard Hot 100	4
US Easy Listening	14
US Cash Box Top 100	1
US R&B	2

=== Year-end charts ===
Chart (1973)	Position
US Billboard	60
US Cash Box Top 100	38

== Certifications ==
Region	Certification	Certified units/sales
United States (RIAA)	Gold	1,000,000^{^}
^{^} Shipments figures based on certification alone.

== Other cover versions ==
Additional interpretations include those by: Pete Marquez, Bloodfire Posse; Mel Brown; East Coast Band; The Friends of Distinction; Home T; Kashif; Louie; Johnny Mathis; and Melvin Sparks. The song was later reinterpreted by Jay-Z and Foxy Brown in their 1996 hit, "Ain't No Nigga".

Jerry Garcia covered the song in a 1974 concert with Merl Saunders. This version was featured on Volume Nine of the Garcia Live series, released on July 28, 2017.

== Personnel ==
- Lead vocals by Levi Stubbs
- Background Vocals by Levi Stubbs, Lawrence Payton, Renaldo "Obie" Benson and Abdul "Duke" Fakir
- Wilton Felder – bass
- Paul Humphrey – drums
- Dennis Lambert – keyboards
- Tony Terran - trumpet
