= Move Along (The Grass Roots album) =

Studio album by The Grass Roots
- Released: 1972
- Studios: ABC, Los Angeles, California
- Genre: Pop
- Length: 35:37
- Label: Dunhill
- Producers: Steve Barri; Rob Grill; Warren Entner

The Grass Roots chronology
Their 16 Greatest Hits (1971)	Move Along (1972)	Alotta Mileage (1973)

Move Along is the sixth studio album by the American rock group the Grass Roots. The album was released in 1972 and charted at No. 86. It was the last of the group's albums to chart on the Billboard Top LPs & Tape chart. The album marked the departures of longtime drummer Rick Coonce and keyboardist Dennis Provisor from the group, though Provisor still contributed to the album both as a performer (uncredited) and as a composer. The A- and B-side singles released were "Two Divided by Love", "Glory Bound" b/w "Only One", "The Runway" b/w "Move Along", and "Anyway the Wind Blows" b/w "Monday Love". Later, the song "Someone to Love" was released as the B side to the song "Love Is What You Make It", which appeared on the band's following album, Alotta Mileage.

== Songs ==
The songs featured string and horn arrangements by Jimmie Haskell. Three hit singles were included on Move Along: "Two Divided by Love" (No. 16), "Glory Bound" (No. 34), and "The Runaway" (No. 39), with the latter being the last Grass Roots song to reach the top 40. Six of the album's songs were written or co-written by Dennis Provisor, and he sang lead vocals on "Two Divided by Love", "Someone to Love", and "Only One". However, he was not credited for his performances on the album.

== Artwork, packaging ==
Move Along was originally released on Dunhill ABC in stereo. The album was designed by David Larkham of Tepee Graphics. Photos taken by Ed Caraeff.

== Reception ==
Professional ratings
Review scores
Source	Rating
Allmusic	2/5 stars

In his retrospective review for Allmusic, critic Joe Viglione called the album "interesting and still listenable" but wrote "Slick arrangements and big production eliminate the charm of the earlier recordings.. and has little surprise and none of the sparkle of the Sloan/Barri days, but it is not without merit."

== Track listing ==
All songs produced by Steve Barri with Rob Grill and Warren Entner.

Side one

1. "The Runway" (Lambert, Potter) – 2:52
2. "Monday Love" (Provisor) – 3:25
3. "Anyway the Wind Blows" (Lambert, Potter) – 2:56
4. "Runnin' Just to Get Her Home Again" (Entner, Provisor) – 3:27
5. "Two Divided by Love" (Lambert, Potter, Kupps) – 2:38
6. "Someone to Love" (Provisor) – 3:22

Side two

1. "Face the Music" (Walsh, Price) – 3:16
2. "Move Along" (Provisor) – 3:21
3. "One Word" (Roberts, Welch) – 2:45
4. "Only One" (Provisor) – 5:01
5. "Glory Bound" (Walsh, Price, Barri, Provisor) – 2:34

== Personnel ==
The Grass Roots

- Rob Grill – vocals, bass, co-producer
- Warren Entner – guitar, vocals, co-producer
- Reed Kailing – guitar
- "Uncle" Virgil Weber – keyboards
- Joel Larson – drums, percussion
- Dennis Provisor – keyboards, vocals (both uncredited)

Technical

- Steve Barri – producer
- Phil Kaye – engineer
- Jimmie Haskell – arrangements
