= Goin' to the Bank =

Single by Commodores

from the album United
- B-side: "Serious Love"
- Released: 1986
- Recorded: 1986
- Genre: R&B; dance-pop; funk
- Length: 4:19
- Label: Polydor
- Songwriter(s): Franne Golde; Dennis Lambert; Andy Goldmark
- Producer(s): Dennis Lambert; Jeremy Smith

Commodores singles chronology
"Janet" (1985)	"Goin' to the Bank" (1986)	"Take It from Me" (1986)

Music video
- "Goin' to the Bank" on YouTube

"Goin' to the Bank" is a song by the group Commodores. It was released as the first single from their twelfth studio album, United, in 1986 by Polydor Records. The song was written by Franne Golde and Dennis Lambert, and produced by Lambert and Andy Goldmark. This single peaked at No. 2 on the US Billboard R&B singles chart.

== Overview ==
"Goin' to the Bank" was produced by Dennis Lambert and Jeremy Smith. In addition to R&B activity in the U.S., it gained airplay on select Top 40 stations in late 1986 and in January 1987, including WSPK "K104.7" in Poughkeepsie, N.Y., and WHLY "Y106" in Orlando, Fla. However, it fell just shy of the Top 40 on a national level. Lambert also composed the song with Franne Golde and Andy Goldmark. "Serious Love", another song from the album was used as the single's B-side.

== Critical reception ==
Jason Elias of AllMusic praised the tune saying:

"...the fun single "Goin' to the Bank."...was funkier then the other singles released in the mid-'80s. The fact made the lead vocalist sound more at home. With its locking beats and solar style jittery synths, this was close to the sound that a lot of established R&B acts were doing to keep up with the times. While this has little of the charm of their 1974-1981 work, it's passable and a half-cut above most of the songs released by their contemporaries and the few self-contained bands that came after them. J.D. Nicholas does a vignette here as a beleaguered doofus running to the bank and has a conversation with a bank teller, Siedah Garrett. If that's not enough kitsch, the Great Britain native Nicholas also does a rap in the world's strongest English accent." (Note: J. D. Nicolas was born on April 12, 1952 in Watford, Hertfordshire, and could be described as having a London or Southern Counties accent.)

Ken Tucker of the Philadelphia Inquirer also declared "Goin' to the Bank, is well-sung fun."

== Credits ==
=== Musicians ===
- Keyboards – Claude Gaudette
- Lead vocals – Walter Orange
- Rap – J. D. Nicholas, Siedah Garrett
- Guitar – Sheldon Reynolds
- Background Vocals – Siedah Garrett, Phil Perry, Dennis Lambert, Darryl Phinnessee

=== Technical ===
- Producer – Dennis Lambert, Jeremy Smith
- Composer – Franne Golde, Dennis Lambert, Andy Goldmark
- Mastering – Stephen Marcussen
- Programming – Claude Gaudette
- Recording, Mixing – Jeremy Smith
- Engineer – Paul Ericksen
- Special Effects – Casey Young
- Arranging – Dennis Lambert

== Charts ==
Chart (1986)	Peak position
US Billboard Hot 100	65
US Billboard Hot Black Singles	2
Belgium Ultratop 50 Singles	11
Dutch Single Top 100	13
Germany Top 100 Singles (GfK Entertainment)	34
New Zealand Hot Singles chart (RIANZ)	39
UK Singles Chart (Official Charts Company)	43
