= Take It from Me =

Take It from Me may refer to:

in film and television:

- Take It from Me (1926 film), a film by William A. Seiter
- Take It from Me (1937 film), a 1937 British comedy film
- Take It from Me (TV series), a 1953–54 television series starring Jean Carroll

in music:

- Take It from Me (album), a 1964 album by Terry Gibbs
- "Take It from Me" (Commodores song) (1987)
- "Take It from Me" (Girlfriend song) (1992)
- "Take It from Me" (Paul Brandt song) (1997)
- "Take It from Me" (Jordan Davis song) (2018)
- "Take It from Me", a 1983 song by Platinum Blonde from Standing in the Dark
- "Take It from Me", a 2016 song by Kongos from Egomaniac
