= Check It Out (album) =

Studio album by Tavares
- Released: January 1974
- Studio: Devonshire Sound Studios (North Hollywood, California)
- Genre: R&B, soul
- Length: 36:27
- Label: Capitol
- Producer: Johnny Bristol, Bob "Boogie" Bowles

Tavares chronology
Check It Out (1974)	Hard Core Poetry (1974)

Professional ratings
Review scores
Source	Rating
AllMusic	4/5 stars

Check It Out is the debut studio album by American soul/R&B group Tavares, released in 1974 on the Capitol label.

== Commercial performance ==
The album peaked at No. 20 on the R&B albums chart. It also reached No. 160 on the Billboard 200. The album features the title track, which peaked at No. 5 on the Hot Soul Singles chart and No. 35 on the Billboard Hot 100, and "That's the Sound That Lonely Makes", which reached No. 10 on the Hot Soul Singles chart and No. 70 on the Billboard Hot 100.

== Track listing ==
Side one
No.	Title	Writer(s)	Length
1.	"If That's the Way You Want It"	Dennis Lambert, Brian Potter	2:49
2.	"Strangers in Dark Corners"	Johnny Bristol	3:57
3.	"That's the Sound That Lonely Makes"	Johnny Bristol, James Dean, John Glover	3:42
4.	"Check It Out"	Floyd Butler, Billy Osborne	3:25
5.	"Wish You Were With Me Mary"	Johnny Bristol	3:23

Side two
No.	Title	Writer(s)	Length
6.	"I'll Never Say Never Again"	Johnny Bristol	2:35
7.	"Little Girl"	Billy Preston	5:58
8.	"Let's Make the Best of What We Got"	Johnny Bristol, George Leovy, James David, Max Hoch	3:34
9.	"I'm in Love"	Bob "Boogie" Bowles	3:58
10.	"Mama's Little Girl"	Dennis Lambert, Brian Potter	3:05

== Personnel ==
Tavares

- Antone "Chubby" Tavares – lead vocals on "If That's the Way You Want It", "Strangers in Dark Corners", and "That's the Sound That Lonely Makes"
- Feliciano Tavares – lead vocals on "Strangers in Dark Corners", "Little Girl", "Let's Make the Best of What We Got" and "I'm in Love"
- Perry "Tiny" Tavares – lead vocals on "That's the Sound That Lonely Makes" and "Wish You Were With Me Mary"
- Arthur "Pooch" Tavares – lead vocals on "I'll Never Say Never Again"
- Ralph Vierra Tavares – lead vocals on "Mama's Little Girl"

with:

- Victor Tavares – lead vocals on “Check It Out”
- James Gadson – drums
- James Jamerson, Jr. – bass
- Weldon Dean Parks, Melvin "Wah Wah" Ragin, David T. Walker – guitar
- Joseph Sample – piano
- Mike Melvoin – keyboards
- Gene Estes – percussion
- Bobbye Hall – conga
- H. B. Barnum – arrangements, conductor

Technical

- Bob "Boogie" Bowles – producer, arrangements and conductor on "Check It Out" and "I'm in Love"
- Greg Venable – sound engineer
- Larkin Arnold – executive supervision
- Brian Panella – album coordination
- John Hoernle – art direction
- Richard Rankin – photography

== Charts ==
Album

Chart (1974)	Peaks
U.S. Billboard Top LPs	160
U.S. Billboard Top Soul LPs	20

Singles

Year	Single	Peaks	
Year	Single	US	US R&B
1973	"Check It Out"	35	5
1974	"That's the Sound That Lonely Makes"	70	10
