= Calgary Safety Roundup =

Canadian television variety series

The Calgary Safety Roundup is a Canadian television variety series broadcast by CFCN-TV in Calgary from 1961 until the mid-seventies.

== Origins ==
The program was developed by Sgt. Don Hanson and Corporal Bill Chisholm of the Calgary Police Department. The pair had organized 'school patrol' traffic safety brigades at local schools to help protect children from the increasing vehicle traffic. As a reward for these volunteers they organized a regular Saturday morning musical variety show and movie at Calgary's Palace Theater. The initial cast of the variety show consisted of pre-teens Sharleen Gibson, Patty Johnson, Cameron Whyte and Will and Charles Wilkinson, and on weekends from 1961 until 1981, they would have The Calgary Safety Patrol Band (now known as the Calgary Round-Up Band) play songs between safety tips. In 1960, a local radio station – CFCN (now CKMX) – began broadcasting these morning concerts.

== Show ==
In 1961, CFCN applied for a broadcast license to become the 2nd television station serving the Southern Alberta area. As part of their promise of performance they created the Calgary Safety Roundup television show. The format was a weekly ½ hour variety program featuring the 5 young singers on a western themed set with hay bales and wagon wheels. Each week young Michael Walterson would make a radio call on the police Harley Davidson down to police headquarters for a safety tip. Hugh Dunn produced the program with program manager Ted Chapman assisted by Grace Depoe. The backup band was Ernie McCullough and the Golden Rockets featuring Slim Johnson and Vergil Canaday with 'Uncle' Andy Anderson on the piano. Over time, the program's broadcast to spread from Saskatchewan to Vancouver. The singers also performed live shows regularly at venues all over Southern Alberta.

In 1963, Bill Chisholm left the show while the cast of entertainers expanded to include young singers Bonnie McHarg, Dixie Lee Stone, Debbie Lain, and many other guest appearances. In 1964 the singers were featured at the Calgary Stampede Main Grandstand program sharing the bill with popular teen entertainer Bobby Curtola. In 1964, the singers were featured in a children's coloring book and Sgt. Don Hanson, the show's creator was voted Calgary's 'Man Of The Year'. The 1963 album sold out 2 pressings.

From 1965, on the Calgary Safety Roundup regularly out-rated Hockey Night in Canada and popular US shows like The Beverly Hillbillies. The entertainers continued to tour and perform at special events, including sharing the stage with Ed Sullivan guests Wayne and Shuster. The group travelled to Ottawa for a command performance for Governor General GP Vanier and his wife, as well as being the featured on the CBC's national Dominion Day special.

In 1966 Dixie left to join the Original Caste.

In 1967 Cameron, Debbie and the Wilkinson Brothers appeared on Oscar Brand's national Brand New Scene TV program

In 1968 Bonnie died after a long illness. Her funeral was attended by thousands of Calgary school children.

By 1968 most of the initial cast members had moved on however the show carried on well into the 70s.
