= Sweet Understanding Love =

Single by Four Tops

from the album Main Street People
- B-side: "Main Street People"
- Released: October 1973
- Recorded: 1973
- Genre: Soul/pop
- Length: 2:59
- Label: ABC Records
- Songwriter(s): R. Benson, V. Benson, I. Hunter
- Producer(s): Steve Barri, Dennis Lambert and Brian Potter

Four Tops singles chronology
"Are You Man Enough?" (1973)	"Sweet Understanding Love" (1973)	"I Just Can't Get You Out of My Mind" (1974)

"Sweet Understanding Love" is a 1973 hit song recorded by the Four Tops for the ABC Records label. The song was the second of three single releases from their sixteenth studio album, Main Street People. The title track of the LP is on the B-side of the 45. "Sweet Understanding Love" was placed on their 1991 compilation album Ain't No Woman (Like the One I've Got). It was also included on their album Anthology: 50th Anniversary (2004).

== Background ==
The song was written by R. Benson, Valaida Benson and I. Hunter.It marked the end of a 10-year run of American Top 40 hits by the group. They would return eight years later when they scored a major comeback hit, "When She Was My Girl".

== Charts ==
The song reached number 10 on the American R&B chart, number 33 on the American Billboard chart in 1973, and number 30 on the Cash Box Top 100. It reached number 29 in the UK.

Chart (1973)	Peak position
UK (Official Charts Company)	29
US Billboard Hot 100	33
US Billboard Hot Soul Singles	10
US Cash Box Top 100	30
