= Country Boy (You Got Your Feet in L.A.) =

Single by Glen Campbell

from the album Rhinestone Cowboy
- B-side: "Record Collector's Dream"
- Released: October 20, 1975
- Recorded: June 4, 1975
- Studio: Sound Labs, Hollywood, California
- Genre: Country
- Length: 3:08
- Label: Capitol
- Songwriter(s): Dennis Lambert; Brian Potter
- Producer(s): Dennis Lambert; Brian Potter

Glen Campbell singles chronology
| "Rhinestone Cowboy" (1975) | "Country Boy (You Got Your Feet in L.A.)" (1975) | "Don't Pull Your Love" (1976) |

"Country Boy (You Got Your Feet in L.A.)" is a song written by Dennis Lambert and Brian Potter, and recorded by American country music singer Glen Campbell. It was released in October 1975 as the second and final single from the album, Rhinestone Cowboy.

It was Campbell's fifth number 1 on the Easy Listening chart and went to number 11 in early 1976 on the Billboard Hot 100. "Country Boy (You Got Your Feet in L.A.)" also went to number 3 on the country chart.

== Chart performance ==
=== Weekly charts ===
| Chart (1975–1976) | Peak position |
|---|---|
| US Hot Country Songs (Billboard) | 3 |
| US Billboard Hot 100 | 11 |
| US Adult Contemporary (Billboard) | 1 |
| Canadian RPM Country Tracks | 1 |
| Canadian RPM Top Singles | 9 |
| Canadian RPM Adult Contemporary Tracks | 1 |
| New Zealand Singles Chart | 11 |

=== Year-end charts ===
| Chart (1976) | Rank |
|---|---|
| Canada RPM Top Singles | 154 |
| U.S. Billboard Hot 100 | 100 |
| U.S. Billboard Adult Contemporary | 36 |
