= Calgary Round-Up Band =

Youth marching band in Calgary, Alberta, Canada

- Location: Calgary, Alberta, Canada
- Founded: 1956
- Championship titles: 2019 WAMSB Junior World Champions
- Website: https://www.roundupband.com/

The Calgary Round-Up Band is a youth marching show band and performing arts ensemble located in Calgary, Alberta, Canada. Having been in operation for 70 years, the ensemble is one of Canada's oldest youth marching bands. They are accompanied by the Calgary Stetson Show Band, Calgary Stampede Show Band, and A Band of Outriders. They travel nationally and internationally each summer to promote its program and The City of Calgary. The band has been performing in the Calgary Stampede Parade for nearly 60 years.

== History ==
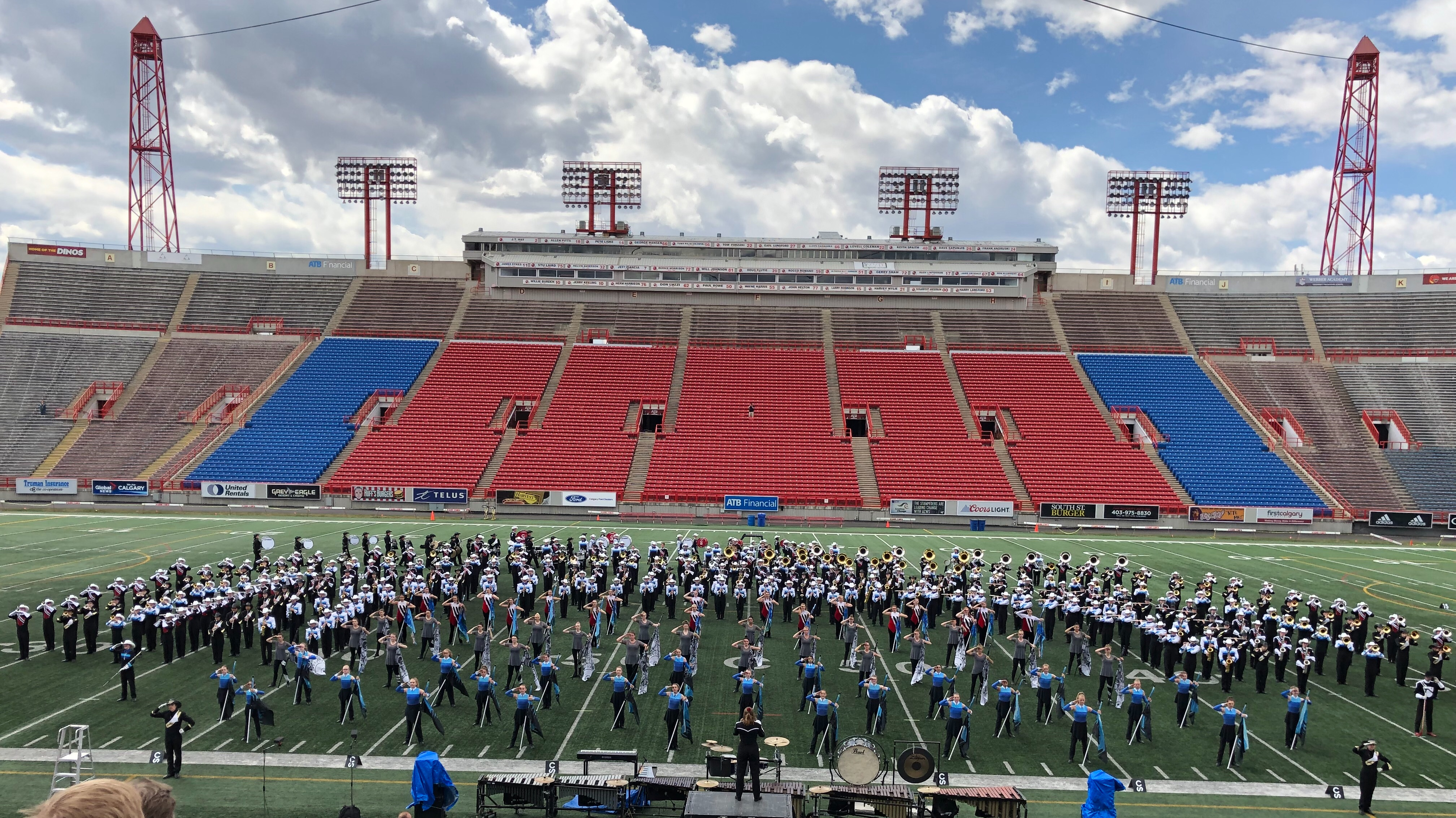
The Calgary Round-Up Band along with the Calgary Stampede Show Band, Calgary Stetson Show Band and Red Deer Royals performing at Music N Motion 2019.

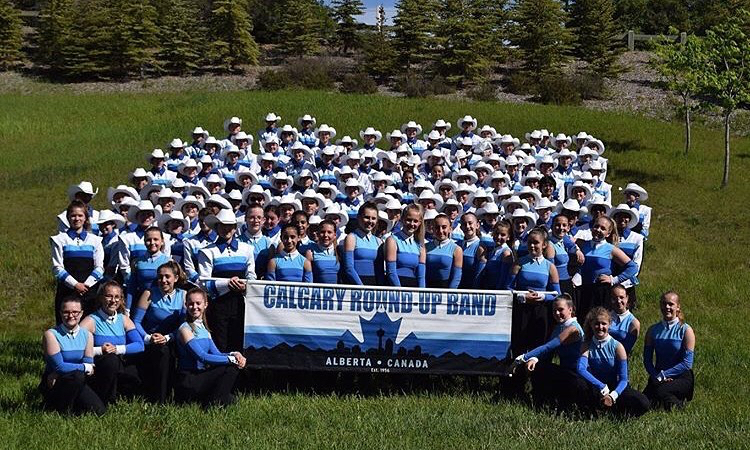
The Calgary Round-Up Band posing for a group photo at the 2019 AMA School Safety Patrol Picnic.

Originally known as "The Calgary Safety Patrol Band," the Calgary Round-Up Band was founded in 1956 by Sergeant Don Hanson and Corporal Chris Chisholm of the Calgary Police Service, and with the help of Kathleen Roberts. The group was originally organized as an after school program at Briar Hill Elementary and Junior High School, which was chosen due to its active music program. During this time the band was composed of recorders, drums and glockenspiels. The original uniform colours were red, black and white: reminiscent of the Calgary Police Service uniform colors. Following a brief year and a half at Briar Hill Elementary and Junior High School, the band moved to Stanley Jones School where it remained for the following ten years.

Between the years of 1961 to 1981, the band appeared weekly on CFCN-TV in a show called “Calgary Safety Round-Up." Every weekend, band members would sing country and pop songs while officers of the Calgary Police Service would fill the time between songs with safety tips. In 1965 the program regularly out-rated Hockey Night in Canada.

The Calgary Round-Up Band had its first out of province performance in 1962 for the Annual Safety Patrol Jamboree held in Ottawa, Ontario. A Douglas DC-6 was charted by the group for a flight to Ottawa, during which there would be very little adult supervision. The following year, in 1963, the group traveled to Vancouver, British Columbia as they were invited to perform at the 51st Grey Cup. A train was organized to carry the "Calgary Safety Patrol Band," which was dubbed the "Milk Train,” because of the donated rail car full of milks and beverages. Once again there was very little supervision. In 1965, the band was invited back to Ottawa for the July 1 Dominion Day holiday (now Canada Day).

In the 1970s, Brass and Woodwind Instruments were added to the band, as well the uniform colors were changed to orange and brown, resulting in the band receiving the nickname “The Root-Beer Band.” In 1975 the Calgary Safety Patrol Band changed the uniform colors a final time to white and blue they still wear to today. The "Calgary Safety Patrol Band" officially changed their name in 1979 to the "Calgary Round-Up Band," after the former Calgary Roundup singers.

1984 saw the band travel to Disneyland where they performed for the mayor of Anaheim, California. The Calgary Roundup band went on to perform at Olympic Venues when Calgary, Alberta hosted the 1988 Winter Olympics. This year also saw them travel on its first international tour to England. Along with the Calgary Stampede Show Band, The Calgary Round-Up Band became the first non-military band to play at Buckingham Palace. 2007 saw the Calgary Roundup Band and its fellow band, Calgary Stetson Showband, almost disband, due to rising costs and the inability to find locations to rehearse. In 2011, the Calgary Roundup Band received $25,000 Canadian from The Keg's "Thanks A Million" campaign. This money was used to buy new instruments to replace the aging instruments the band was currently using. The band was invited to perform at the Okanagan Military Tattoo; in its 2019 performance the band was joined with the Brentwood Imperial Youth Band from Brentwood, Essex. To help build excitement for the band's upcoming performance at the Okanagan Military Tattoo, they performed a flash mob at the Kelowna Farmers' Market. 2019, also saw Calgary, Alberta host The World Association of Marching Show Bands World Championships, where the band competed and won the World Junior Champions and World Drum Line Champions Title.

For their 2021-2022 season the Calgary Round-Up Band combined with the Calgary Stetson Show Band due to low membership as a result of the COVID-19 pandemic.

== Performances ==
The Calgary Round-Up band performs all across the province of Alberta each year. These include Music N' Motion, a spring exhibition held annually in Calgary, The Calgary Stampede Parade, Celebration of Sound, a summer exhibition held in Calgary and the Banff Canada Day Parade. The band also performs in the High River Little Britches Parade and various other parades throughout the province. During the winter months, September to March, the band operates as a concert band, while the color guard operates as a winter guard. In 2012, 2019, and 2023, the band competed at the World Association of Marching Show Band (WAMSB) World Championship. The band also competes yearly in Show Bands Live, a competition hosted in Calgary, Alberta. The band also performs around Spruce Meadows annually.

== Awards ==
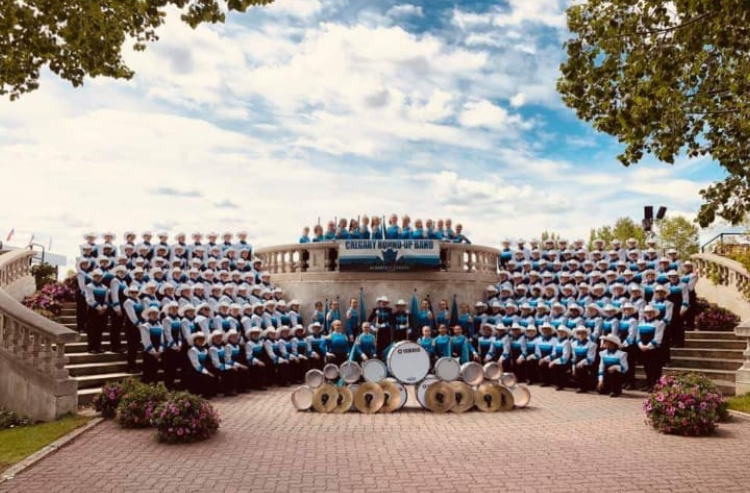
The Calgary Round-Up Band in a group photo taken at Spruce Meadows in 2019

=== Calgary Stampede Parade ===
- 1998 - Top Canadian Band
- 1999 - Top Canadian Band
- 2002-2005 - Best Junior Band
- 2019 - Best Junior Band

=== World Association Of Marching Show Bands World Championship ===
- 1999 - World Junior Champions
- 2000 - Gold Medal
- 2012 - Gold Medal Junior Band
- 2019 - Drum Line World Champions
- 2019 - World Junior Champions
- 2023 - Gold Medal (7th Place)

=== Other Awards ===
- 2000 - Edmonton Klondike Day's Parade- Top Canadian Band
- 2003 - Calgary Stampede Competition for Marching Show Bands - Received prestigious Holman Cup for the Most Outstanding Band
