= Keeper of the Castle (song) =

Single by The Four Tops

from the album Keeper of the Castle
- B-side: "Jubilee with Soul"
- Released: November 1972
- Recorded: 1972
- Studio: ABC, Los Angeles, California
- Genre: R&B, soul
- Length: 2:44
- Label: ABC-Dunhill
- Songwriter(s): Dennis Lambert, Brian Potter
- Producer(s): Steve Barri, Dennis Lambert, Brian Potter

The Four Tops singles chronology
"(It's the Way) Nature Planned It" (1972)	"Keeper of the Castle" (1972)	"Guardian De Tu Castillo" (1972)

"Keeper of the Castle" is a song recorded and released by American singing group the Four Tops, notable as the first hit the group scored on the ABC-Dunhill label after leaving Motown in 1972. The song, a social commentary on men's roles in relationships, was co-written by Dennis Lambert, who also produced the song and other songs off their album of the same name.

== Reception ==
Upon its release, the single peaked at number ten on the US pop chart and number seven on the R&B charts. Overseas, "Keeper of the Castle" peaked at number 18 on the UK singles chart. It had a lesser showing in Canada, yet still reaching the Top 40 (#32).

== Chart performance ==
Chart (1972/73)	Peak position
Canada RPM Top Singles	32
UK Singles (The Official Charts Company)	18
US Billboard Hot 100	10
US Best Selling Soul Singles (Billboard)	7
US Cash Box Top 100	9

== Later uses ==
"Keeper of the Castle" was sampled in the 1973 break-in record, "Super Fly Meets Shaft" (US #31).
