= Big John (Ain't You Gonna Marry Me) =

Single by The Shirelles

from the album Baby It's You
- B-side: "Twenty-One"
- Released: 1961
- Recorded: Bell Sound (New York City)
- Genre: R&B
- Length: 2:21
- Label: Scepter Records 1223
- Songwriter(s): John Patton, Amiel Sommers
- Producer(s): Luther Dixon

The Shirelles singles chronology
"What a Sweet Thing That Was" (1961)	"Big John (Ain't You Gonna Marry Me)" (1961)	"Baby It's You" (1961)

"Big John (Ain't You Gonna Marry Me)" is a song written by John Patton and Amiel Sommers and performed by The Shirelles. It was featured on their 1962 album, Baby It's You.

The song was produced by Luther Dixon and recorded at Bell Sound Studios in New York City.

== Chart history ==
The song reached #2 on the R&B chart and #21 on the Billboard Hot 100 in 1961.

Chart (1961)	Peak position
U.S. Billboard Hot 100	21
U.S. Billboard Hot R&B Sides	2

== In media ==
- The song was featured in the jukebox musical Baby It's You!
