= The Glades =

The Glades or The glades may refer to:

- The Glades (Bromley), a shopping centre in London, United Kingdom
- The Glades (Florida), a region of Florida
- The Glades (New Jersey), a nickname given to The Glades Wildlife Refuge in southern New Jersey, along the Delaware Bay
- The Glades (TV series), a 2010 television series set in Broward County, Florida
- Cranberry Glades, a bog in West Virginia that is also commonly known as "The Glades"

== In Music ==
- Glades (band), an Australian indie group formed in 2015.
- The Glades (festival grounds), a music venue in the Laurel Highlands of Pennsylvania established in 2017.

== See also ==
- Everglades (disambiguation)
- Glade (disambiguation)
