= Nightshift (album) =

Studio album by Commodores
- Released: January 15, 1985
- Recorded: 1984
- Studios: Soundcastle, Los Angeles, California
- Genres: Funk; synth-pop; new wave; R&B; progressive pop
- Length: 38:41
- Label: Motown
- Producer: Dennis Lambert

Commodores chronology
All the Great Love Songs (1984)	Nightshift (1985)	The Very Best Of (1985)

Professional ratings
Review scores
Source	Rating
Allmusic	3/5 stars
Globe and Mail	(favourable)
Philadelphia Inquirer	3/4 stars
Record Mirror	4/5 stars
Rolling Stone	3.5/5 stars
Smash Hits	3/10

Nightshift is the eleventh studio album by the Commodores, released by Motown Records on January 15, 1985. This album was certified Gold in the US by the RIAA.

== Background ==
Nightshift is the Commodores' second studio album without Lionel Richie, who left the band in 1982, and their last studio album with their original bass guitarist Ronald LaPread. Their previous album Commodores 13 (1983) had featured interim lead vocalist Harold Hudson of Mean Machine. For Nightshift the Commodores permanently replaced Richie with British-born J.D. Nicholas, formerly of Heatwave. Dennis Lambert was chosen as producer, the Commodores hoping to find the same magic created by producer/arranger James Anthony Carmichael, with whom they had worked since 1974 and who was a major impetus in their earlier success.

== Critical reception ==
With a 4 out of 5 stars rating, Paul Sexton of Record Mirror described the album as "a really remarkable renaissance."

Liam Lacey of the Globe and Mail said "The Commodores' latest holds up impressively throughout, and the presence of new lead vocalist J. D. Nicholas is a welcome, if not startling, change."

== Chart performance ==
The album remained in the top of the US Billboard Top R&B Albums charts in the US for a month. Nightshift also peaked at No. 3 on the Billboard 200.

=== Singles ===
The biggest song was its title track, "Nightshift". Written by Walter Orange, Dennis Lambert and Franne Golde, "Nightshift" was the band's biggest post–Lionel Richie hit, reaching No. 3 on the Billboard Hot 100, and No. 1 on Billboard's Hot R&B Songs. Paying tribute to the late soul singers Marvin Gaye and Jackie Wilson, who both died in 1984, "Nightshift" also earned the group its only Grammy.

Two other singles, coming off the album, were later released. "Animal Instinct", with Orange on lead vocals, reached No. 23 on the R&B charts, and No. 43 on the pop charts. Another single, "Janet", barely made Billboard's Top 100 and never appeared on Billboard's Hot R&B Songs chart. However, Janet peaked at No. 8 on the Billboard Adult Contemporary Songs charts.

== Track listing ==
1. "Animal Instinct" (Martin Page) – 4:54
2. "Nightshift" (Dennis Lambert, Franne Golde, Walter Orange) – 5:03
3. "I Keep Running" (Harold Hudson, Shirley King, William King) – 4:11
4. "Lay Back" (Dennis Lambert, Franne Golde, Martin Page, Milan Williams) – 5:01
5. "Slip of the Tongue" (Lenny Macaluso, Peter Beckett) – 3:53
6. "Play This Record Twice" (Kevin Smith, Ronald LaPread) – 4:22
7. "Janet" (Bobby Caldwell, Franne Golde, Paul Fox) – 3:41
8. "Woman in My Life" (Keith Stegall, Patrick Henderson) – 3:34
9. "Lighting Up the Night" (Diane Warren, Jeff Lorber) – 4:02

== Personnel ==
Commodores

- William King – keyboards, backing vocals
- Milan Williams – keyboards
- Ronald LaPread – bass, backing vocals
- Walter Orange – drums, lead vocals (1, 2, 5–9), backing vocals
- J. D. Nicholas – lead vocals (2–4), backing vocals

Additional musicians

- Peter Wolf – keyboards, synthesizers, bass programming, drum programming
- Paul Fox – synthesizers, bass programming, drum programming
- Harold Hudson – synthesizers
- Paul Jackson Jr. – synthesizers, guitars, bass programming, drum programming
- Dennis Lambert – synthesizers, percussion, backing vocals
- Jeff Lorber – synthesizers, bass programming, drum programming
- Peter Maunu – guitars
- Neil Stubenhaus – bass
- "Ready" Freddie Washington – bass
- Vinnie Colaiuta – drums
- John Robinson – drums
- Paulinho da Costa – percussion
- Gary Herbig – saxophones (9)
- Larry Williams – saxophones (9)
- Gary Grant – trumpet (9), flugelhorn (9)
- Jerry Hey – trumpet (9), flugelhorn (9)
- Gregory Alexander – backing vocals
- Tracee Augcomfar – backing vocals
- Doris Garrett – backing vocals
- Siedah Garrett – backing vocals
- Patricia Hamlin – backing vocals
- Phillip Ingram – backing vocals
- Darryl Phinnessee – backing vocals
- Ambrose Price – backing vocals
- Sheldon Reynolds – backing vocals
- David Swanson – backing vocals

Music arrangements

- Dennis Lambert – BGV arrangements
- Peter Wolf – arrangements (1, 2, 4, 5, 8)
- Paul Fox – arrangements (3, 7)
- Harold Hudson – arrangements (3)
- William King – arrangements (3)
- Paul Jackson Jr. – arrangements (6)
- Jerry Hey – horn arrangements (9)
- Jeff Lorber – arrangements (9)

== Production ==
- Dennis Lambert – producer
- William King – co-producer (3)
- Jeremy Smith – associate producer, engineer
- Paul Ericksen – associate engineer
- Bino Espinoza – assistant engineer
- Fred Law – assistant engineer
- John Matousek – mastering at Motown/Hitsville U.S.A. Recording Studios (Hollywood, California)
- Marrianne Pellicci – album coordinator
- Gail Pierson – album coordinator
- Johnny Lee – art direction
- Janet Levinson – design
- Ron Slenzak – photography
- Dan Cleary for BNB Associates – management

== Charts ==
Chart (1985)	Peak position
US Billboard 200	3
US Billboard Top R&B Albums	1
Australia Albums (Kent Music Report)	44
Dutch Album Top 100	1
Germany Top 100 Albums (GfK Entertainment)	4
New Zealand Top 40 Albums (RIANZ)	13
Sweden Top Albums (Sverigetopplistan)	22
Switzerland Albums Top 100 (Swiss Hitparade)	8
UK Top 100 Albums (Official Charts Company)	13

== Certifications ==
Country	Year	Certifications
US	1985	Gold (RIAA)
