= Keeper of the Castle =

Studio album by The Four Tops
- Released: November 1972
- Studios: ABC, Los Angeles, California
- Genre: R&B
- Label: Dunhill • Probe
- Producers: Steve Barri, Dennis Lambert, Brian Potter

The Four Tops chronology
Nature Planned It (1972)	Keeper of the Castle (1972)	Main Street People (1973)

Singles from Keeper of the Castle
- 1. "Keeper of the Castle" Released: 1972; 2. "Ain't No Woman (Like the One I've Got)" Released: January 1973

Professional ratings
Review scores
Source	Rating
AllMusic	3.5/5 stars
Robert Christgau	C−
The Encyclopedia of Popular Music	3/5 stars
The Rolling Stone Album Guide	3/5 stars

Keeper of the Castle is the twelfth album by R&B group the Four Tops, released in 1972. It was the band's first album for the ABC Dunhill label having left Motown earlier in the year.

The title track peaked at No. 18 on the UK Singles Chart.

== Critical reception ==
Robert Christgau wrote that with "superschlockers" Steve Barri, Dennis Lambert, and Brian Potter producing, "the results are too overbearing to interest anyone but professional theorists of camp."

== Track listing ==
All tracks written by Brian Potter and Dennis Lambert where indicated:

1. "Keeper of the Castle"
2. "Ain't No Woman (Like the One I've Got)"
3. "Put a Little Love Away"
4. "Turn On the Light of Your Love" (Len Perry, Levi Stubbs, Jr., Renaldo Benson, Abdul Fakir)
5. "When Tonight Meets Tomorrow" (Al Cleveland, Renaldo Benson, Len Perry)
6. "Love Music"
7. "Remember What I Told You to Forget"
8. "(I Think I Must Be) Dreaming"
9. "The Good Lord Knows" (Renaldo Benson, Len Perry)
10. "Jubilee With Soul" (Joe Smith, Val Benson, Renaldo Benson)
11. "Love Makes You Human" (Val Benson, Renaldo Benson, Len Perry)
12. "Keeper of the Castle (Reprise)"

== Personnel ==
- Levi Stubbs – lead baritone vocals
- Lawrence Payton – second tenor background vocals
- Renaldo "Obie" Benson – bass background vocals
- Abdul "Duke" Fakir – first tenor background vocals
- David Cohen, Joe Smith, Larry Carlton, Richard Bennett – guitar
- Ron Brown, Wilton Felder – bass
- Paul Humphrey – drums
- Brian Potter, Gary Coleman, King Errisson, Victor Feldman – percussion
- Dennis Lambert – keyboards
- Jimmie Haskell – Moog synthesizer, string and horn arrangements
- Dennis Lambert, Don Hockett, Gil Askey – string and horn arrangements
- Jerome Richardson – piccolo flute solo on "When Tonight Meets Tomorrow" and saxophone solo on "Love Makes You Human"
- Tony Terran – trumpet solo on "Love Music"
- Chip Crawford – organ solo on "Love Makes You Human"
- Sid Sharp – string conductor
- Rudy Mazur – art work
