= Rhinestone Cowboy (album) =

Studio album by Glen Campbell
- Released: July 1975
- Recorded: 1975
- Studios: Sound Labs, Hollywood, California
- Genre: Country
- Label: Capitol
- Producers: Dennis Lambert, Brian Potter

Glen Campbell chronology
Ernie Sings & Glen Picks (1975)	Rhinestone Cowboy (1975)	Bloodline (1976)

Singles from Rhinestone Cowboy
- 1. "Rhinestone Cowboy" Released: May 26, 1975; 2. "Country Boy (You Got Your Feet in L.A.)" Released: October 20, 1975

Rhinestone Cowboy is the 28th studio album by American country music musician Glen Campbell, released in July 1975 by Capitol Records. It is a concept album based on the idea of an over-the-hill country musician who is uneasy about his previous fame. The album was recorded in Hollywood, and produced by Dennis Lambert and Brian Potter. Featuring the hit singles such as "Rhinestone Cowboy" and "Country Boy (You Got Your Feet in L.A.)", the album peaked at number 17 on the Billboard 200.

The album was re-issued on March 31, 2015. It contains a previously unreleased track, "Quits". It also contained the Japan-only track "Coming Home" and the B-side "Record Collectors Dream".

Professional ratings
Review scores
Source	Rating
AllMusic	5/5 stars

== Track listing ==
=== Side one ===
1. "Country Boy (You Got Your Feet in L.A.)" (Dennis Lambert, Brian Potter) – 3:08
2. "Comeback" (Lambert, Potter) – 3:23
3. "Count on Me" (Lambert, Potter) – 3:12
4. "I Miss You Tonight" (Lambert, Potter) – 3:07
5. "My Girl" (Smokey Robinson, Ronald White) – 3:14

=== Side two ===
1. "Rhinestone Cowboy" (Larry Weiss) – 3:15
2. "I'd Build a Bridge" (Mike Settle) – 3:43
3. "Pencils for Sale" (Johnny Cunningham) – 3:42
4. "Marie" (Randy Newman) – 3:34
5. "We're Over" (Barry Mann, Cynthia Weil) – 2:59

=== 2015 bonus tracks ===
1. "Record Collector's Dream" (Bill C. Graham)
2. "Coming Home" (Bill Backer, Billy Davis, Rod McBrien) produced by Billy Davis; arranged by Dennis McCarthy
3. "Quits" (Danny O'Keefe)
4. "Country Boy (You Got Your Feet in L.A.)" remixed by Howard Willing
5. "Rhinestone Cowboy" remixed by Howard Willing and Julian Raymond

== Personnel ==
- Glen Campbell – vocals, acoustic guitar
- Dean Parks – electric guitar
- Ben Benay – electric guitar
- Fred Tackett – acoustic guitar
- Scott Edwards – bass guitar
- Michael Omartian – keyboards
- Dennis Lambert – keyboards, percussion
- Ed Greene – drums
- Dave Kemper – drums
- Brian Potter – percussion
- Gary Coleman – percussion
- Paul Hubinon, Chuck Findley, Don Menza, Jerome Richardson, Tom Scott, George Bohanon, Lew McCreary, Dalton Smith - horns
- Sid Sharp and the Boogie Symphony - strings
- Ginger Baker, Julia Tillman Waters, Maxine Willard Waters - backing vocals

Production

- Producers – Dennis Lambert, Brian Potter
- Arranged and conducted by Thomas Sellers
- Engineer – Joe Sidore
- Mastered at Mastering Lab, Hollywood, CA
- Production assistant – Marsha Lewis
- Art/Photography – Roy Kohara
- Embroidery – Helen Hamako Holden

== Charts ==
Chart (1975)	Peak position
Australia (Kent Music Report)	54
Canada Top Albums/CDs (RPM)	7
UK Albums (Official Charts)	38
US Billboard 200	17
US Top Country Albums (Billboard)	1

== Certifications ==
Certifications for Rhinestone Cowboy
Region	Certification	Certified units/sales
United Kingdom (BPI)	Silver	60,000^{^}
United States (RIAA)	Gold	500,000^{^}
^{^} Shipments figures based on certification alone.
