= One Tin Soldier =

1969 song performed by The Original Caste

Single by The Original Caste

from the album One Tin Soldier
- B-side: "Live for Tomorrow"
- Released: November 1969
- Recorded: 1969
- Genre: Folk rock
- Length: 3:38
- Label: Bell
- Songwriters: Dennis Lambert, Brian Potter

The Original Caste singles chronology
"I Can't Make It Anymore" (1968)	"One Tin Soldier" (1969)	"Mr. Monday" (1970)

"One Tin Soldier" is a 1960s counterculture era anti-war song written by Dennis Lambert and Brian Potter. Canadian pop group The Original Caste (consisting of Dixie Lee Innes, Bruce Innes, Graham Bruce, Joseph Cavender and Bliss Mackie) first recorded it in 1969 for the T-A record label and the parent Bell Records label. Its debut—ranked #1 of 50 new "Singles Coming Up" by Record World—got "solid heavy airplay"... promptly selling 7,500 copies in Denver, alone.

The song, recorded by various artists, charted each year from 1969 to 1974 on various charts in the United States and Canada. It also charted in Australia.

"One Tin Soldier" went to number 6 on the RPM Magazine charts, hit the number 1 position on CHUM AM in Toronto on 27 December 1969, and The Original Caste version reached number 34 on the Billboard Hot 100 Chart in 1969. It was a bigger hit on the Billboard Easy Listening Chart (Adult Contemporary), reaching number 25 and number 5 on the Canada Adult Contemporary Chart.

A 1971 cover was a hit in the U.S. for Jinx Dawson, lead vocalist of Coven, whose recording was featured in the film Billy Jack. (Reportedly, she got the gig when first choice, Linda Ronstadt was not available.) The single went to number 26 on the Billboard pop chart (another source says the 1971 Coven version peaked at 34 on the Billboard list), before it was pulled from radio by the film's producer. On November 20, 1971, Coven performed "One Tin Soldier" on the Dick Clark ABC-TV Saturday-afternoon program American Bandstand. A re-recorded version by Coven made the Billboard U.S. chart in 1973, peaking at number 79.. Their 1971 version was re-released in 1974, peaking at 73 in the U.S.

In 1972, Skeeter Davis had moderate success on the American country charts with her rendering, but did very well in Canada, peaking at number 4 on the country chart and number 2 on the Adult Contemporary chart. Davis received a Grammy nomination for Best Female Country Vocal Performance, for her recording of "One Tin Soldier".

== Harmony ==
"One Tin Soldier" has been said to have the same harmonic base as Pachelbel's Canon. The intro is pulled directly from Pachelbel's Canon with the first seven chords of "One Tin Soldier" matching those of Pachelbel's Canon. However, the two pieces diverge at the eighth chord and eighth note of each part, respectively. The remainder of "One Tin Soldier" merely has some aural similarities in the verses and has several significantly different chords.

== Lyrics synopsis ==
"One Tin Soldier" describes the story of two fictional kingdoms: the Mountain People, a peaceful group who possess a great treasure, and the Valley People, a warlike group who desire the treasure for themselves.

The Valley People send a demand for the treasure to the Mountain People; in reply, the Mountain People offer to share it. The Valley People angrily refuse the offer and declare war on the Mountain People, resulting in genocide of the latter. Once the treasure is located, it is revealed that it is actually a boulder inscribed with "peace on earth" on the bottom, implying the invasion was pointless.

== Coven version ==
"One Tin Soldier (The Legend of Billy Jack)"

Single by Coven

from the album Original Sound Track Music from the Motion Picture "Billy Jack"
- B-side: "I Think You Always Knew (The Theme from Billy Jack)"
- Released: September 1971
- Recorded: 1971
- Genre: Pop
- Length: 3:18
- Label: Warner Bros.
- Songwriters: Dennis Lambert and Brian Potter
- Producer: Mundell Lowe

Singer Jinx Dawson of the band Coven performed the song at a 1971 session with the film's orchestra as part of the soundtrack for the Warner Bros. film Billy Jack. Dawson asked that her band, Coven, be listed on the recording and film, not her name as a solo artist. This Warner release, titled as "One Tin Soldier (The Legend of Billy Jack)", reached number 26 on the Billboard Hot 100 in the fall of 1971.

The full Coven band then re-recorded the song for their self-titled MGM album, which displayed the band members' whited-out faces on the cover, contrived by the film's producer Tom Laughlin. Coven hit the charts again with the song in 1973, in both the new MGM recording and a reissue of their Warner original. The Coven recording was named Number One All Time Requested Song in 1971 and 1973 by the American Radio Broadcasters Association.

== Chart history ==
The Original Caste

Chart (1969–1970)	Peak position
Canada RPM Adult Contemporary	5
Canada RPM Top Singles	6
U.S. Billboard Hot 100	34
U.S. Billboard Adult Contemporary	25
U.S. Cash Box Top 100	34

Coven cover

Chart (1971–72)	Peak position
Australia Kent Music Report	45
Canada RPM Top Singles	89
Canada RPM Adult Contemporary	32
U.S. Billboard Hot 100	26
U.S. Billboard Adult Contemporary	16
U.S. Cash Box Top 100	26

Skeeter Davis cover

Chart (1972)	Peak position
Canada RPM Adult Contemporary	2
Canada RPM Country	4
U.S. Billboard Country	54

Coven (2nd charting)

Chart (1973)	Peak position
U.S. Billboard Hot 100	79
U.S. Cash Box Top 100	68

Original Caste (2nd charting)

Chart (1973)	Peak position
Canada RPM Top Singles	45

Coven (3rd charting)

Chart (1974)	Peak position
Canada RPM Top Singles	79
U.S. Billboard Hot 100	73
U.S. Cash Box Top 100	73

== Other recordings ==
In 1969, British singer Karen Young recorded it, reaching 74 on the Australian charts.

John Kurtz recorded it for ABC records in 1973.

A version recorded by Guy Chandler (titled "One Tin Soldier [The Legend of Billy Jack]") was released in the summer of 1973.

A version sung by Cher, with a video created by animator John David Wilson was produced for The Sonny & Cher Comedy Hour.

Roseanne Barr parodied the song on her 1990 album I Enjoy Being a Girl.

Delores Laughlin sang an abbreviated version of the song during the end credits of the film sequel Billy Jack Goes to Washington (1977).

The song has been covered by other artists, including Billy Strings, Mad Parade, Gimp, Me First and the Gimme Gimmes, Bushman, and Killdozer. Actress Brittany Murphy, in character as Luanne Platter, sang the song on the King of the Hill soundtrack. This song was also covered by Voices for Peace, a band consisting of a group of voice actors including Greg Ayres and Tiffany Grant. Abigail and Milly Shapiro covered the song for their live album Live Out Loud.

Toronto hardcore punk band Direct Action included a cover of the song on their Trapped in a World LP (1985).

== Awards and recognition ==
In 1972, "One Tin Soldier" was one of the 99 most-performed songs in the BMI repertoire licensed for public performance. Accordingly, BMI awarded Citations of Achievement to writers Lambert and Potter, and publisher ABC/Dunhill Music, Inc.

Skeeter Davis' 1972 recording earned her a Grammy nomination for Best Female Country Vocal Performance.

By mid-1973, "One Tin Soldier" had been added to 20 hymn books—religious and secular.

== See also ==
- List of anti-war songs
