= Bloodline (Glen Campbell album) =

Studio album by Glen Campbell
- Released: April 1976
- Recorded: 1976
- Studio: Sound Labs, Hollywood, California
- Genre: Country pop
- Label: Capitol
- Producer: Dennis Lambert; Brian Potter

Glen Campbell chronology
Rhinestone Cowboy (1975)	Bloodline (1976)	Southern Nights (1977)

Professional ratings
Review scores
Source	Rating
Allmusic	link

Bloodline is the thirty-first studio album by American singer/guitarist Glen Campbell, released in 1976.

== Track listing ==
All tracks composed by Dennis Lambert and Brian Potter; except where indicated
Side 1:

1. "Baby Don't Be Giving Me Up" – 3:31
2. "See You on Sunday" – 3:35
3. "Don't Pull Your Love/Then You Can Tell Me Goodbye" (Lambert, Potter, John D. Loudermilk) – 3:22
4. "Christiaan No" (Jimmy Webb) – 2:34
5. "Bloodline" (Stephen Geyer) – 4:32

Side 2:

1. "Everytime I Sing a Love Song" (Gloria Sklerov, Phyllis Molinary) – 3:09
2. "Lay Me Down (Roll Me Out to Sea)" (Larry Weiss) – 4:12
3. "The Bottom Line" – 3:35
4. "I Got Love for You Ruby" (Sandy Linzer) – 3:37
5. "San Francisco Is a Lonely Town" (Ben Peters) – 3:21

== Personnel ==
- Glen Campbell – vocals, acoustic guitar
- Dean Parks – electric guitar
- Ben Benay – electric guitar
- Fred Tackett – acoustic guitar
- Larry Carlton – electric guitar
- Joe Sidore – acoustic guitar
- Scott Edwards – bass guitar
- Lee Sklar – bass guitar
- Ed Greene – drums
- Dave Kemper – drums
- Billy Graham – fiddle
- Carl Jackson – banjo
- Dennis Lambert – keyboards, percussion
- Michael Omartian – keyboards
- Tom Sellers – keyboards
- Gary Coleman – percussion
- Paul Hubinon, Chuck Findley, Jim Horn, Tom Scott, Dick Hyde – horns
- Sid Sharp – concertmaster strings
- Ginger Baker, Julia Tillman Waters, Maxine Willard Waters, David Durham, Oren Waters, Michael Smotherman, Lisa Roberts, Glen Campbell – backing vocals

== Production ==
- Producers – Dennis Lambert, Brian Potter
- Arranger – Thomas Sellers
- Engineer – Joe Sidore
- Recorded by Ralph Osborn III
- Mastering Engineer – Mike Reese
- Production assistant – Marsha Lewis
- Rhythm arranged by Michael Omartian on "Don't Pull Your Love/Then You Can Tell Me Goodbye", "Lay Me Down (Roll Me Out To Sea)" and "Bloodline"

== Charts ==
Album – Billboard (United States)

Chart	Entry date	Peak position	No. of weeks
Billboard Country Albums	January 5, 1976	2	18
Billboard 200	January 5, 1976	63	9

Singles – Billboard (United States)

Year	Single	Hot Country Singles	Hot 100	Easy Listening
1976	""Don't Pull You Love/Then You Can Tell Me Goodbye""	4	27	1
1976	"See You On Sunday"	18	-	15
