= This Heart (Gene Redding song) =

Single by Gene Redding
- B-side: "What Do I Do on Sunday Morning?"
- Released: April 1974 (U.S.)
- Length: 3:22
- Label: Haven
- Songwriters: Dennis Lambert, Brian Potter
- Producers: D. Lambert, B. Potter

Gene Redding singles chronology
"I Need Your Loving" (1969)	"This Heart" (1974)	"Blood Brothers" (1974)

"This Heart" is a song originally recorded by Gene Redding in 1974. The song was written by the songwriting team of Dennis Lambert and Brian Potter.

"This Heart" was released as a single during the spring of the year, and became a hit in the United States (#24) and Canada (#28). The song also was a U.S. R&B hit.

== Chart history ==
Chart (1974)	Peak position
Canada RPM Top Singles	28
U.S. Billboard Hot 100	24
U.S. Billboard Hot Soul Singles	31
U.S. Cash Box Top 100	22
