= Take It from Me (Commodores song) =

"Take It From Me"

Single by Commodores

from the album United
- B-side: "I Wanna Rock You"
- Released: 1986
- Recorded: 1986
- Genre: R&B
- Length: 4:02
- Label: Polydor
- Songwriters: Franne Golde, Dennis Lambert, Andy Goldmark
- Producer: Dennis Lambert

Commodores singles chronology
"Goin' to the Bank" (1986)	"Take It From Me" (1986)	"United in Love" (1986)

Music video
- "Take It From Me" on YouTube

"Take It From Me" is a song by the group Commodores. It was released as the second single from their twelfth studio album, United, in 1986 by Polydor Records. It peaked at No. 38 on the Billboard R&B singles chart.

"Take It from Me" was produced by Dennis Lambert, who also composed the song with Franne Golde and Andy Goldmark. "I Wanna Rock You", another song from the album, was used as the B-side of the single.
