= Smith (band) =

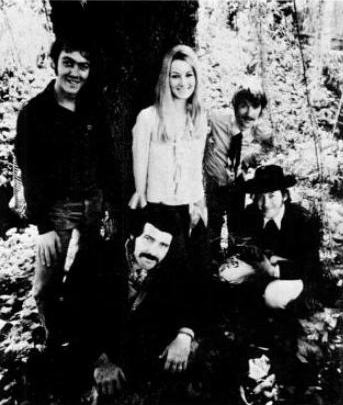
- Smith in 1970

Background information
- Origin: Los Angeles, California, United States
- Genres: Pop rock; blue-eyed soul
- Years active: 1969–1971
- Label: Dunhill

Smith was an American rock band formed in 1969 in Los Angeles, California. They had a soul-based sound and scored a Top 5 hit in the United States in 1969 with the Burt Bacharach song "Baby It's You", featuring Gayle McCormick on lead vocals. The record sold over one million copies between July and October 1969, out-charted popular versions by the Beatles and the Shirelles, and was awarded a gold record by the Recording Industry Association of America.

== Beginnings ==
The group evolved from a band called The Smiths (not to be confused with the 1980s British band). They released the single "Now I Taste the Tears", but the track was not commercially successful.

Subsequently, Gayle McCormick (who had started her career singing songs by Tina Turner, Etta James and others) was added as a frontwoman and lead vocalist. The group was discovered in a Los Angeles nightclub by 1960s rocker Del Shannon, who arranged "Baby It's You" for the group, now called Smith, leading to their being signed to ABC-Dunhill Records.

== Career ==
Smith released an album titled A Group Called Smith, which spent 11 weeks in the Top 40 album listings of the since-called Billboard 200 record chart. On the album, vocals were split amongst Rich Cliburn, Jerry Carter and McCormick. Smith recorded a second album titled Minus-Plus with less success since it only reached #74. Smith's version of "The Weight" was included on the epochal Easy Rider soundtrack because, due to contractual reasons, The Band's version, which appeared in the movie, was unavailable. Most of their material consisted of covers of popular rock and R&B tunes.

The band's singles "Take a Look Around" and "What Am I Gonna Do" reached the charts, but the group broke up after two albums. The band's hit "Baby It's You" was featured in Quentin Tarantino's Grindhouse film, Death Proof.

== McCormick solo career ==
After Smith disbanded, McCormick went on to record three solo albums, Gayle McCormick in 1971, Flesh & Blood in 1972 and One More Hour in 1974. The single "It's a Cryin' Shame" from her eponymous first album was a minor hit for her, reaching No. 44 on the charts in 1971. In Canada it reached #41. It and "Gonna Be Alright Now" were included on the 1994 reissue of A Group Called Smith.

== Members ==
Smith was composed of one woman and four men, with two additional male instrumentalists:

- Gayle McCormick – lead vocals
- Larry Moss – organ
- Jerry Carter – bass
- Robert Evans – drums
- John Horrigan – drums
- Rich Cliburn – lead guitar
- Alan Parker – guitar

== Discography ==
=== Albums ===
- A Group Called Smith (Dunhill, 1969)
- Minus-Plus (Dunhill, 1970)

=== Singles ===
- "Now I Taste the Tears" (1968) US Cashbox No. 110
- "Baby It's You" (1969) US Billboard No. 5; CAN RPM No. 4
- "Take a Look Around" (1970) US Billboard No. 43; CAN RPM No. 22
- "What Am I Gonna Do" (1970) US Billboard No. 73
- "Comin Back to Me (Ooh Baby)" (1970) US Billboard No. 101
