= Shaft in Africa (soundtrack) =

Film score by Johnny Pate
- Released: 15 June 1973
- Recorded: 1972–73
- Genre: Funk; soul
- Length: 26:30
- Label: ABC Records
- Producer: Steve Barri

Professional ratings
Review scores
Source	Rating
AllMusic	4.5/5 stars

Shaft in Africa is the soundtrack produced by Johnny Pate for the film Shaft in Africa and distributed for ABC Records in 1973.

== Track listing ==
=== Side A ===
1. You Can't Even Walk in the Park (Opening Theme) – 2:30
2. Are You Man Enough? (Main Title) by The Four Tops – 2:10
3. Aleme Finds Shaft – 1:33
4. Shaft in Africa (Addis) – 3:04
5. Headman – 2:14
6. El Jardia – 3:02

=== Side B ===
7. Are You Man Enough? by The Four Tops – 3:24
8. Jazar's Theme – 1:33
9. Truck Stop – 2:15
10. Aleme's Theme – 2:17
11. El Jardia (Reprise) – 1:43
12. Are You Man Enough? (End Title) by The Four Tops – 0:43
