= In the City (Tavares album) =

Studio album by Tavares
- Released: July 1975
- Studio: Sound Labs (Hollywood, California)
- Genre: R&B, soul
- Length: 35:25
- Label: Capitol Records
- Producer: Dennis Lambert, Brian Potter

Tavares chronology
Hard Core Poetry (1974)	In the City (1975)	Sky High! (1976)

Professional ratings
Review scores
Source	Rating
AllMusic	4.5/5 stars
Christgau's Record Guide	B+

In the City is the third studio album by American soul/R&B group Tavares, released in 1975 on the Capitol label.

== Commercial performance ==
The album peaked at No. 8 on the R&B albums chart. It also reached No. 26 on the Billboard 200. The album features the singles "It Only Takes a Minute", which peaked at No. 1 on the Hot Soul Singles chart and No. 10 on the Billboard Hot 100, The Edgar Winter Group's "Free Ride", which charted at No. 8 on the Hot Soul Singles chart and No. 52 on the Billboard Hot 100, and "The Love I Never Had", which reached No. 11 on the Hot Soul Singles chart.

== Track listing ==
Side one
No.	Title	Writer(s)	Length
1.	"It Only Takes a Minute"	Dennis Lambert, Brian Potter	3:59
2.	"Fool's Hall of Fame"	George Clinton	3:28
3.	"The Love I Never Had"	Dennis Lambert, Brian Potter	3:26
4.	"Nothing You Can Do"	Alan Gorrie, Hamish Stuart, Roger Ball	3:54
5.	"In the Eyes of Love"	Dennis Lambert, Brian Potter	3:42

Side two
No.	Title	Writer(s)	Length
6.	"Ready, Willing and Able"	Dennis Lambert, Brian Potter	4:17
7.	"We Fit to a Tee"	Dennis Lambert, Brian Potter, Willie Harry Wilson	3:08
8.	"Free Ride"	Dan Hartman	2:57
9.	"I Hope She Chooses Me"	Willie Harry Wilson	3:22
10.	"In the City"	Feliciano Tavares, Lola Tavares	3:12

== Charts ==
Album

Chart (1975)	Peaks
U.S. Billboard Top LPs	26
U.S. Billboard Top Soul LPs	8

Singles

Year	Single	Peaks		
Year	Single	US	US R&B	US Dan
1975	"It Only Takes a Minute"	10	1	2
1975	"Free Ride"	52	8	—
1976	"The Love I Never Had"	—	11	—
