= Do Right (Glades song) =

Single by Glades

from the album To Love You
- Released: 15 December 2017
- Recorded: 2017
- Genre: Indie pop; electronic
- Length: 3:14
- Label: Glades
- Songwriters: Cameron Robertson; Joseph Wenceslao; Karina Wykes; Amy Allen
- Producer: Cameron Robertson

Glades singles chronology
"Love You Better" (2017)	"Do Right" (2017)	"Not About You" (2018)

"Do Right" is a song by Australian electronica, indie pop band Glades. The song was released digitally on 15 December 2017 as the lead single from the band's debut studio album To Love You (2018) and peaked at number 51 on the ARIA Charts. The song is set in E♭ Major and has 107 beats per minute.

In December 2017 in an interview with Press Play OK, band member Karina Wykes said, "We wrote 'Do Right' while we were on a writing trip in New York. At the time there were a lot of crazy and messed up things in the news. We wanted to spread a message of love instead of hate. This song is about loving those around you and how treating people with love creates more love."

== Reception ==
Thomas Bleach called the song "a polished synth pop track that looks at looking out for each other and treating everyone well. A basic message that the world truly needs right now."

== Charts ==
Chart (2018)	Peak position
Australia (ARIA)	51

== Certifications ==
Region	Certification	Certified units/sales
Australia (ARIA)	Gold	35,000^{‡}
^{‡} Sales+streaming figures based on certification alone.

== Release history ==
Country	Date	Format	Label
Australia	15 December 2017	Digital download, streaming	Glades
