= The Original Caste =

Canadian folk group

- Origin: Calgary, Alberta, Canada
- Years active: 1966–present
- Labels: Dot; Talent Associates
- Members: Bruce Innes; Julian Kerr; Shelley Jones; Bruce Mohacsy; Lori Mohacsy
- Past members: Dixie Lee Innes; Bliss Mackie; Graham Bruce; Peter Brown; Joseph Cavender; Gary Carlson; Dennis Coats; Richard Harrow; Glenn Mundy; John Dunn; Cheryl Morrell; Jilla Roberts

The Original Caste is a Canadian folk group. The band formed in Calgary, Alberta, Canada, in 1966 under the name The North Country Singers. Because the name sounded too much like a folk group, it was changed in 1968.

== History ==
Songwriter and guitarist Bruce Innes formed the group in Calgary, Alberta, in 1966. Initially, Bruce Innes, Graham Bruce and Bliss Mackie worked as a trio and Dixie Lee (Stone) Innes joined the group in 1967, contributing rich vocals. At that time, Dixie Lee Stone was a secretary at Pacific Petroleums in Calgary, and she sang on the weekly television programme Calgary Safety Roundup on CFCN-TV. Bruce Innes sang and played by himself while Graham Bruce worked as an accounts executive at Royal Trust. Bliss Mackie had worked as a Coca-Cola truck driver and a manager of a department store. In early 1968, Peter Brown (Seattle) became the first drummer in the group. Joe Cavender played with an acid rock group.

In 1968, the band moved to Los Angeles and recorded the single "I Can’t Make It Anymore" for Dot Records with limited success. In 1969, the band signed with TA Records, a label distributed by Bell Records. The band did write many of their pieces but the writing and production team of Dennis Lambert and Brian Potter wrote and produced The Original Caste's two hit singles: "One Tin Soldier" and then "Mr. Monday"; both songs were from the 1969 LP One Tin Soldier. The songs employ the use of strings, horns, and organ which adds a swinging, pop-friendly sound. "One Tin Soldier" was a hit in Canada and reached No. 34 on the U.S. Billboard Hot 100 chart in 1970. The follow-up single, "Mr. Monday", was a big hit in Japan and Canada but not in the United States. The two singles combined, worldwide, sold over three million copies and were certified gold in both Canada and Japan. The band toured extensively in Canada, the United States and Japan and made many television appearances. The band's success allowed them the opportunity to open for both B. B. King and Glen Campbell. Having amassed a large following in Japan, they toured there and recorded live albums, in addition to releasing several further Japanese singles.

The initial members of The Original Caste separated in 1972 with Graham Bruce and Bliss Mackie parting. Married couple Bruce and Dixie Innes continued to perform as The Original Caste and released songs with an increased country influence, including the full-length album Back Home. The Original Caste finally split in 1980 as Bruce and Dixie divorced. Innes continues to perform as a solo artist and later revived the band name in the new millennium.

== Members ==
- Bruce Innes – lead guitar; keyboard, and vocals. Founder and current member. While in college, Innes played guitar with blues legend Josh White. In the late 1970s Innes worked on John Denver's Rocky Mountain High album and supplied songs to Ray Stevens and Mickey Gilley. Upon the band's final split, Innes began jingle and film score work. In 2003, Bruce Innes and Ian Tyson produced WMA Album of the Year for country artist Brenn Hill. Innes is remarried and currently resides in Alberta.
- Julian Kerr – guitar; keyboard; vocals
- Shelley Jones – lead vocals
- Bruce Mohacsy – bass; vocals; keyboard
- Lori Mohacsy – vocals

=== Past members ===
- Dixie Lee (Stone) Innes – vocals. After her divorce from Bruce Innes, Dixie left the music industry and found a new career as a social worker, living in Victoria, British Columbia. She died in September 2024.
- Bliss Mackie – rhythm guitar and vocals.
- Graham Bruce – bass
- Peter Brown – drums; jazz drummer and classical percussionist, currently performing and teaching in Skagit County, WA.
- Joseph Cavender – drums; replaced Brown in 1970
- Gary Carlson – bass; replaced Bruce in 1972
- Dennis Coats – rhythm guitar; replaced Mackie in 1972
- Richard Harrow – later addition
- Glenn Mundy – later addition
- John Dunn – later addition
- Cheryl Morrell – vocals; performed with in 2005
- Jilla Roberts – vocals; performed with in 2006–2009

== Discography ==
=== Albums ===
Year	Album details	CAN
1969	One Tin Soldier: Released: 1969; Label: TA Records	14
1971	Live in Japan Volume 1: Released: 1971; Label: Bell	—
1971	Greatest Hits: Released: 1971; Label: Bell	—
1971	Live in Japan Volume 2: Released: 1971; Label: Bell	—
1974	Back Home: Released: 1974; Label: Century II, Capitol	—

=== Singles ===
Year	Single	Chart Positions					Album
Year	Single	CAN	CAN AC	CAN Country	AUS	US	Album
1968	"I Can't Make It Anymore"	99	—	—	—	—	single only
1969	"One Tin Soldier"	6	5	—	46	34	One Tin Soldier
1970	"Mr. Monday"	4	—	—	—	119	One Tin Soldier
1970	"Country Song"/"Nothing Can Touch Me"	29	—	—	—	114	One Tin Soldier
1970	"Ain't That Telling You People"	43	2	—	—	117	One Tin Soldier
1971	"Sault Ste Marie"	35	7	15	—	—	Live in Japan Volume 1
1973	"One Tin Soldier" (re-release)	45	—	—	—	—	single only
