= Gayle McCormick =

American singer (1948–2016)

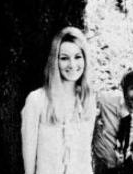
- McCormick in 1970

Background information
- Born: November 26, 1948; St. Louis, Missouri, U.S.
- Died: March 1, 2016 (aged 67) St. Louis, Missouri, U.S.
- Genres: Rock; blues
- Occupation: Singer
- Years active: 1965–1976

Gayle McCormick (November 26, 1948 – March 1, 2016) was an American singer, best known for her work with the rock band Smith. Her recording and performing career stretched from 1965 to 1976.

== Early life ==
She was born Gayle Annette to Richard and Ethel McCormick, who had an older son, Michael (b. 1945). Gayle attended Pattonville High School in Maryland Heights, Missouri and sang high soprano with the Suburb Choir, a 150-voice unit that performed annually with the St. Louis Symphony. She was influenced by Aretha Franklin, Gladys Knight and, especially, Tina Turner.

== The Klassmen ==
In 1967, she was the lead singer in a pop band named Steve Cummings and The Klassmen. The band released a single in 1967 titled "Without You" which had local success in Missouri, and a second and final single in 1968 titled "Wonderous Time." Both songs were supported by early TV videos, which since have been circulated online. Soon afterward, she moved to California and joined what became Smith.

== Smith ==
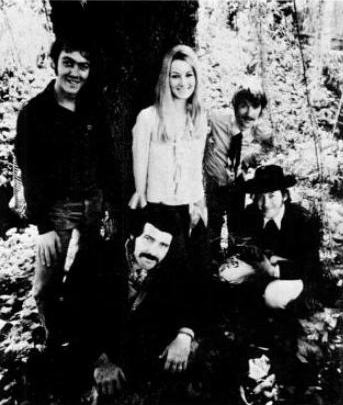
Gayle McCormick (in the middle of the back row) as part of Smith in 1970

In 1969, Smith was formed in Los Angeles, their first album titled A Group Called Smith, featured McCormick as the primary vocalist. On the strength of her vocals, Smith made the top five with a remake of Burt Bacharach's "Baby It's You", charting higher than the previous hit version by The Shirelles. Smith's version, as sung by McCormick, was featured in Quentin Tarantino's film Death Proof, part of the Grindhouse double feature.

== Solo career ==
After the group Smith disbanded, she recorded three solo albums. Many of her songs were penned by Dennis Lambert and Brian Potter, who also produced Gayle McCormick, her debut album of mostly covers. This platter was released in 1971 on ABC Dunhill, the same label as the contemporary sensation Three Dog Night. To support this record, McCormick took her touring group, billed as the Underhand Band, on the road across North America. McCormick's outfit opened for Three Dog Night.

McCormick confessed that she intentionally shed her 'Smith' image (even though her new band routinely performed "Baby It's You"). She stated that she felt more confident as a solo artist, being able to choose her own material. "I pick songs that I can feel and put myself into," McCormick told a Cincinnati Enquirer reporter. While she did not envision herself singing professionally in another twenty years, she was enjoying herself on the road.

On the radio, McCormick's performance of Lambert and Potter's "It's a Cryin' Shame" charted at a modest #44 on the Billboard Hot 100 but later became a top 10 hit on the new Adult Contemporary chart. It was covered in 1976 by Cher. McCormick also recorded an American Bandstand video for "It's a Cryin' Shame". Her follow-up single, "You Really Got a Hold on Me", barely scraped the Billboard Hot 100 at #98. Another single, "C'est La Vie", failed to generate any chart activity. McCormick recorded a version of "Superstar" at around the same time as the Carpenters recorded their major hit.

McCormick admitted her first album was something of a "downer ... Most of the songs, well, just weren't my kind of material," she said. "But I did it because it was a single album and...I needed that. Now, I know what I want to do." She hinted that her next releases would move away from the "bubble-gum" of her first single and fully embrace the R&B style she greatly preferred.

McCormick recorded her second album on a new label, Decca/MCA at Bolic Sound Studios in early 1972. Jay Lasker of Dunhill had dropped McCormick from his label for lack of sales. Grousing about the recent trend of "singing broads," Lasker implied that he had expected McCormick's debut to perform as well as Carole King's. "It just didn't work out," he bluntly told The Philadelphia Inquirer in 1972. However, McCormick continued to work with manager Burt Jacobs, the same manager as Three Dog Night.

Flesh & Blood, McCormick's new package of R&B-influenced tunes, was perhaps her strongest offering, with generally positive reviews in the U.S. and Canada. It was co-produced by Tom Thacker and Joe Schermie, former bassist for Three Dog Night. The LP cover featured McCormick in tight cutoffs and a form-fitting top, capitalizing on the chiefly male appeal she was receiving at this time.

McCormick co-wrote "Take Me Back", the opening track on Flesh & Blood, and she had more creative control over her material. Frank Collette of the Underhand Band recorded most of the keyboards, with contributions from Gary Stephens and Eddie Beyer. Stan Seymore played guitar, Maurice Miller handled the drums, and Ray Neapolitan served as bassist. In addition, the multi-instrumentalist Don Menza played and arranged the "McCormick Horns" section with Chuck Findley (trumpet and trombone), Slyde Hyde (additional trombones), and Sam Falzone (tenor saxophone).

McCormick toured with her nine-piece band in support of Flesh & Blood, including several dates on the California night-club circuit. Despite Decca's efforts to rebrand McCormick, neither single from her second album, the ballad "Near You" nor the rock-inflected "Grey Line Tour", charted. More than one reviewer from this period lamented the fact that McCormick possessed great vocal talent, but could not find a radio hit.

After two big commercial disappointments in the top 40 arena, McCormick changed music labels once again in 1973, this time to Fantasy Records. She continued to tour sporadically, sharing one date with the ascendant Stevie Wonder in El Paso. Ultimately, McCormick drifted toward the Easy Listening and Country and Western spheres, releasing the album One More Hour on Fantasy in 1974. Reviews were sparse in comparison with her earlier music, but still somewhat favorable. Like its predecessor, Hour failed to chart despite a spirited cover of "Original Midnight Mama", which echoed her first love of R&B music.

For her final efforts at Top 40 airplay, McCormick recorded two dance-rock tracks, "Coming in Out of the Rain" and "Simon Said", for a 1975 45 single on the Shady Brook label. McCormick also contributed backing vocals to Jimmy Rabbitt and Renegade's Waylon Jennings-produced 1976 self-titled Capitol LP, from which the single "Ladies Love Outlaws" was drawn. At this time, she covered "Torn Between Two Lovers", first made popular by Mary MacGregor.

== Personal life ==
Much attention was paid to Gayle McCormick's appearance during her breakout period in 1971–1972. Most of this press exposure was positive. "I started out looking like the stereotypical rock singer...faded jeans, messy hair, no make-up. But now I've been there and I know that's not really me at all." In the same interview, she joked that she hoped to one day share the same stage as French mime Marcel Marceau. McCormick's attractiveness also caught the notice of male reviewers, whose observations ranged from flattering to misogynistic. For example, one concert reviewer in Wisconsin hailed the vocalist as a "rock-blues empress," and another male reporter in Minnesota crassly described her as a "b---h goddess in tight pants."

After a troubled relationship with one of her Smith bandmates, McCormick focused on her music career. On September 22, 1972, she married a carpenter named Richard L. Halley in Carson City, Nevada. They moved to Hawaii soon thereafter. Her union with Halley lasted under three years. According to records on Ancestry, they were divorced in Los Angeles sometime in June 1975.

== Final years ==
After leaving professional music, Gayle McCormick returned home to St. Ann, Missouri and pursued a quiet career in retail and information technology. She never remarried or had any children. Gayle did not resume her singing career. She later cited burnout from the atmosphere of alcohol and drugs shared by many musicians, both of which she ultimately rejected, but she was a lifelong smoker. McCormick stayed very close to her mother Ethel until her death in 2010.

In late 2015, McCormick was hospitalized for pneumonia, and during the treatment, it was discovered that she had cancer that had metastasized from a tumor in a lung to the rest of her body. Disc jockey Jonnie King was often by her side as the former vocalist fought for her life. McCormick died of cancer March 1, 2016 in suburban St. Louis. She was age 67. VH1's Save the Music Foundation was instrumental in raising Gayle McCormick's profile after she died.

== Discography ==
- Gayle McCormick (Dunhill, 1971)
- Flesh & Blood (Decca, 1972)
- One More Hour (Fantasy, 1974)
