= To Love You (album) =

Studio album by Glades
- Released: 2 November 2018
- Length: 37:08
- Label: Warner Music Australia
- Producer: Cam Robertson; Joey Wenceslao; Grant Konemann

Glades chronology
This Is What It's Like (2016)	To Love You (2018)	Planetarium (2021)

Singles from To Love You
- 1. "Do Right" Released: 15 December 2017; 2. "Not About You" Released: 25 May 2018; 3. "Eyes Wide Shut" Released: 7 September 2018; 4. "Nervous Energy" Released: 18 October 2018

To Love You is the debut studio album released by Australian indie pop group Glades. The album was released through Warner Music Australia on 2 November 2018.

The album's release was announced in early October 2018, alongside an Australian tour. In a statement, the band said "To Love You explores the idea that there's more to love than pure romance. Not only romantic love; it explores different forms of love, such as loving the people around you, loving those who can't express that they need love, as well as loving yourself."

== Reception ==
Professional ratings
Review scores
Source	Rating
The Music	4/5 stars
The AU Review	4/5 stars

Emily Blackburn from The Music game the album 4 out of 5 saying "To Love You is openly authentic and raw at its core, delivering the ups and downs of whirlwind loves with tracks you can’t help but dance along too.". Holly Leszczynski from The AU Review said "With a brilliant combination of upbeat, danceable electronic tracks and passionate, pop ballads, the album is one which will find itself permanently embedded in your summer playlist.". Apple Music reviewed the album saying "On their sentimental debut, Sydney trio Glades trace the good, bad, and ugly of relationships and discover a universal truth: There's always a place for synth-pop power ballads, especially if you've been wronged." adding "Glades make glass-half-full love songs that you can sing, dance, and cry to all at once." Lauren from Sounds of Oz described the album as a "perfect pop for the new millennium, with a fresh sound anchored by real heart."

== Track listing ==
All tracks produced by Cameron Robertson, except where noted.

No.	Title	Writer(s)	Producer(s)	Length
1.	"Nervous Energy"	Cameron Robertson; Joseph Wenceslao; Karina Wykes; Colin Dieden; Elijah Noll		3:16
2.	"Do Right"	Robertson; Wenceslao; Wykes; Amy Allen		3:17
3.	"Not About You"	Robertson; Wenceslao; Wykes		3:13
4.	"80 Miles"	Robertson; Wenceslao; Wykes		3:28
5.	"Neon Buzz"	Robertson; Wenceslao; Wykes; Dillon Deskin		2:33
6.	"Sweetheart"	Robertson; Wenceslao; Wykes; Deskin		3:17
7.	"Eyes Wide Shut"	Robertson; Wenceslao; Wykes; James Norton		3:46
8.	"Porcelain"	Robertson; Wenceslao; Wykes; Norton		3:21
9.	"Drive"	Robertson; Wenceslao; Wykes	Robertson; Wenceslao	3:10
10.	"Better Love"	Robertson; Wenceslao; Wykes		4:20
11.	"Through to You"	Robertson; Wenceslao; Wykes; Autumn Rowe	Robertson; Grant Konemann	3:27
Total length:				37:08

== Charts ==
Chart (2018)	Peak position
Australian Hitseekers Albums (ARIA)	3

== Release history ==
Region	Date	Label	Format	Catalogue
Australia	2 November 2018	Warner Music Australia	CD, digital download, streaming	5419703205
