= Talent Associates =

American television production company

- Industry: Production company
- Founded: 1952; 74 years ago
- Defunct: 1977; 49 years ago
- Fate: Absorbed into Time Life Television
- Headquarters: New York City, New York
- Key people: David Susskind; Ron Gilbert; Leonard Stern; Daniel Melnick

Talent Associates, Ltd. (also known as Talent Associates-Paramount, Ltd. and Talent Associates-Norton Simon, Inc.), was a production company headed by David Susskind, later joined by Daniel Melnick, Leonard Stern and Ron Gilbert.

== Origins ==
In the years after World War II, Susskind was a talent agent for Century Artists, ultimately ending up in the powerhouse Music Corporation of America's fairly newly minted television program department, managing Dinah Shore, Jerry Lewis, and others. He then went to New York and formed Talent Associates, representing creators of material rather than performers. Susskind converted Talent Associates into a packaging company for new programs in 1952.

== Golden Age television ==
Talent Associates produced some of the classic series of the Golden Age of Television, such as the Wally Cox comedy Mister Peepers, the anthology teleplay series The Goodyear Television Playhouse/The Philco Television Playhouse and Armstrong Circle Theatre. In 1953-54, Talent Associates produced Jamie starring a young Brandon deWilde, fresh off his success in George Stevens' Shane (1953), for ABC. De Wilde together with veteran character actor Ernest Truex, told the story of aging Grandpa McHummer striking a bond with young Jamie, his recently orphaned grandson.

Talent Associates was structured like a small, family-run firm; Susskind deliberately chose young and inexperienced associates, many of them women, who would learn on the job.

== Expansion ==
Susskind began to branch out, putting together Broadway shows ("Mr. Lincoln") and feature films (A Raisin in the Sun). Talent Associates won more than 20 Emmy awards in the 1960s and 1970s.

A few key projects to note:

=== Open End/The David Susskind Show ===
In 1958, Susskind became the host of Open End, one of the first major TV talk shows. The title refers to the irregular run time - guests would talk until they had nothing left to say. Open End ended in 1966, but was replaced by the fixed length The David Susskind Show.

=== East Side/West Side ===
By 1963, Susskind had a reputation as a maverick, one of the last producers willing to stand up to the ever more powerful TV networks; his East Side/West Side, a hard-hitting dramatic series starring George C. Scott, began on CBS in 1963 and won fairly high critical praise. In an era when race relations was a volatile subject in the United States, East Side/West Side featured Cicely Tyson in one of the first major regular roles for an African-American actress in a primetime drama, and the series dealt a few times with issues facing African-Americans, as well as other urban issues such as drug addiction and abortion, leading to some affiliates in Southern states not clearing the program. East Side/West Side also had trouble attracting advertisers. The drama was canceled by CBS after only one season, due also in large part with CBS programming head James Aubrey's discomfort with the socially conscious subject matter, as well as Aubrey's conflicts with Scott and Susskind over the direction of the series. David Susskind appears as himself in one episode, hosting a television discussion.

=== Get Smart ===
While East Side/West Side was in production, two young writers, Mel Brooks and Buck Henry, were working at Talent Associates in New York City on the script for a new pilot, which became an enduring legacy of Talent Associates. This was the sitcom Get Smart, a spoof of the then-popular secret agent genre, which premiered in 1965 on NBC and starred Don Adams and Barbara Feldon. Production took place at Sunset Bronson Studios in Hollywood, so Talent Associates had to establish a West Coast presence.

Get Smart spanned 138 episodes over 5 years, and was very popular in broadcast syndication. It spawned sequels, reunion shows and even major feature films decades after its premiere.

=== Other ===
Talent Associates continued with television and motion picture projects, including producing duties on Alice Doesn't Live Here Anymore, the 1974 film, and McMillan & Wife, the 1971-1977 TV series. The company also ventured into game shows, packaging the original version of Supermarket Sweep, and its successor The Honeymoon Race; as well as The Generation Gap; and an unsold pilot, King of the Hill.

== T-A Records ==
Talent Associates also had a short-lived record division, known as T-A Records, which released a total of only 4 LP titles. The label's product was distributed through Bell Records. The soft rock duo Seals and Crofts were signed to the label in 1969. After releasing two albums which received little attention the group moved to Warner Bros. Records in 1971 where they recorded a string of hit records during the 1970s. A Canadian folk group called The Original Caste reached #34 on the Billboard Hot 100 singles chart on T-A with the original recording of "One Tin Soldier" in 1970. Another T-A Records R&B group Five Flights Up, had a Billboard Top 40 single with "Do What You Wanna Do" which peaked at #36 in the fall of 1970.

== Ownership changes ==
From 1961 to 1965, Paramount Pictures owned a 50% stake in Talent Associates. In August 1968, the company was acquired by industrialist Norton Simon, becoming known as Talent Associates-Norton Simon, Inc. until 1974, when Susskind and Gilbert bought it back. In 1977, the company was sold to Time-Life Films. Warner Bros. Discovery's HBO Entertainment and Warner Bros. Pictures Distribution currently owns the copyrights to the Talent Associates library. There are a few exceptions—for instance, McMillan & Wife is owned by Universal Television, who co-produced the show with Talent Associates, and East Side/West Side, owned by Amazon MGM Studios as the successor-in-interest to United Artists.
