= Baby It's You =

1961 single by the Shirelles

Single by the Shirelles

from the album Baby It's You
- B-side: "The Things I Want to Hear (Pretty Words)"
- Released: November 1961
- Studio: Bell Sound (New York City)
- Length: 2:42
- Label: Scepter
- Composer: Burt Bacharach
- Lyricists: Mack David; Barney Williams a.k.a. Luther Dixon
- Producer: Luther Dixon

The Shirelles singles chronology
"Big John (Ain't You Gonna Marry Me)" (1961)	"Baby It's You" (1961)	"Soldier Boy" (1962)

"Baby It's You" is a song written by Burt Bacharach (music), Luther Dixon (credited as Barney Williams), and Mack David (lyrics). It was recorded by the Shirelles and the Beatles and was a hit for both. The highest-charting version of "Baby It's You" was by the band Smith, who took the track to No.5 on the US charts in 1969.

== The Shirelles' original version ==
The song was produced by Luther Dixon. When released as a single in 1961 in the US, it became a Top 10 smash on the Pop and R&B Charts. It reached No.3 on the R&B chart, peaked at No.8 on Billboard's Hot 100 chart, and was No. 18 in Canada. It later appeared on the album Baby It's You, named to capitalize on the success of the single. The vocal arrangements on this version proved influential in subsequent ones, including that by the Beatles. One notable feature of the song is its minor-to-major key chord changes on the verses.

== The Beatles version ==
"Baby It's You"
- Sheet music cover

Song by the Beatles

from the album Please Please Me
- Released: March 22, 1963 (UK Please Please Me album); January 10, 1964 (US Introducing... The Beatles album)
- Recorded: February 11 & 20, 1963
- Studio: EMI, London
- Genre: Merseybeat
- Length: 2:40
- Label: Parlophone
- Composer: Burt Bacharach
- Lyricists: Mack David; Barney Williams a.k.a. Luther Dixon
- Producer: George Martin

"Baby It's You"

Single by the Beatles

from the album Live at the BBC
- Released: March 20, 1995
- Recorded: June 1, 1963 (United Kingdom)
- Genre: Merseybeat
- Length: 2:44
- Label: Apple
- Composer: Burt Bacharach
- Lyricists: Mack David; Barney Williams a.k.a. Luther Dixon
- Producer: George Martin

The Beatles singles chronology
"The Beatles' Movie Medley" (1982)	"Baby It's You" (1995)	"Free as a Bird" (1995)

The British rock band the Beatles performed "Baby It's You" as part of their stage act from 1961 until 1963, and recorded it on February 11, 1963, for their first album, Please Please Me, along with "Boys", another song by the Shirelles. The American label Vee-Jay Records included it on Introducing... The Beatles and Songs, Pictures and Stories of the Fabulous Beatles. Capitol included it on The Early Beatles. The Beatles' version differs from the Shirelles' in that it repeats the second verse instead of the first.

A live version was released on Live at the BBC in 1994. Here, Lennon does not repeat part of the second verse after the solo (as he did on the studio recording), but repeats part of the first verse, which is the way the Shirelles sang the song. The song was issued as a CD single and a vinyl E.P. in 1995 in both the UK and the US, the Beatles' first in nearly a decade. Both versions have four tracks. The three additional tracks, while from BBC recordings, did not appear on Live at the BBC. "I'll Follow the Sun" and "Boys" were later included on On Air – Live at the BBC Volume 2, but this recording of "Devil in Her Heart" remains unique to this release. The single reached No.7 in the UK and No.67 on the Billboard Hot 100.

1995 release track listing

1. "Baby It's You" (Bacharach/David/Williams) – 2:45
2. "I'll Follow the Sun" (Lennon–McCartney) – 1:51
3. "Devil in Her Heart" (Drapkin) – 2:23
4. "Boys" (Dixon/Farrell) – 2:29

=== Music video ===
A live music video was released in 1994 to promote the single. It consisted of a combination of the Beatles dancing and still photographs, and was later included on a DVD or Blu-ray with the 2015 release 1+.

=== Personnel ===
- John Lennon – vocals, rhythm guitar
- Paul McCartney – bass guitar, backing vocals
- George Harrison – lead guitar, backing vocals
- Ringo Starr – drums
- George Martin – celesta, producer
- Norman Smith – engineer

=== Charts ===
Chart (1995)	Peak position
Australia (ARIA)	33
Belgium (Ultratop 50 Flanders)	43
Denmark (IFPI)	8
Europe (Eurochart Hot 100)	17
Germany (GfK)	94
Ireland (IRMA)	12
Netherlands (Single Top 100)	44
New Zealand (Recorded Music NZ)	30
Scottish Singles Sales (Official Charts)	5
UK Singles (Official Charts)	7
US Billboard Hot 100	67
US Maxi-Singles Sales (Billboard)	31

== Smith version ==
"Baby, It's You"

Single by Smith

from the album A Group Called Smith
- B-side: "I Don't Believe (I Believe)"
- Released: June 1969
- Recorded: 1969
- Genre: Blues rock
- Length: 3:27
- Label: Dunhill
- Composer: Burt Bacharach
- Lyricists: Mack David; Barney Williams a.k.a. Luther Dixon
- Producers: Steve Barri, Joel Sill

Smith singles chronology
"Now I Taste the Tears" (1968)	"Baby, It's You" (1969)	"Take a Look Around" (1970)

Smith's version appeared on their debut album, A Group Called Smith. The single was released on Dunhill Records (4206) in 1969. It was their first and most successful release. This version, arranged by Del Shannon who "discovered" the group, alters the traditional vocal arrangement as performed by the Shirelles and the Beatles in favor of a more belted, soulful vocal. The single hit No.5 on the Billboard Hot 100, and was ranked No.28 in Billboard's year-end chart of 1969. They performed the song live on The Ed Sullivan Show which can be seen on The Best of the Ed Sullivan Show channel, available on various streaming services. The Smith version was later used in Quentin Tarantino's Death Proof.

=== Charts ===
Chart (1969)	Peak position
Canada Top Singles (RPM)	4
US Billboard Hot 100	5

== Sylvie Vartan version (in French) ==
"Baby c'est vous"

Single by Sylvie Vartan

from the album Sylvie
- Language: French
- B-side: "Gong-gong"
- Released: July 1962
- Genre: Pop
- Length: 2:41
- Label: RCA Victor
- Composer: Burt Bacharach
- Lyricists: Mack David; Barney Williams a.k.a. Luther Dixon, Guy Bertret, Roger Desbois
- Producer: Luther Dixon

Sylvie Vartan singles chronology
"Qui aurait dit ça" (1962)	"Baby c'est vous" (1962)	"Madison Twist" (1962)

In 1962, the song was adapted into French by Guy Bertret and Roger Desbois as Baby c'est vous and performed by French pop singer Sylvie Vartan and was released as a single in July 1962 as the second single off of her debut album Sylvie. Vartan's version received a "Tip" position in the French Belgian charts in 1962.

=== Charts ===
Chart (1962)	Peak position
Belgium (Ultratop 50 Wallonia)	Tip
