= The Glade (magazine) =

Archery magazine

The Glade was a quarterly archery magazine published in the UK with a worldwide readership.

== History ==
The magazine was started in 1978 by Ted Bradford.

Bought by Geoff and Paul Tittensor in 2008, The Glade was incorporated into Bow International magazine.

== Regular Contributors ==
Hugh Soar wrote about the longbow and its history. He has written several books on the subject, including The Crooked Stick: A History of the Longbow (Weapons in History S.), Pub Westholme U.S., (2004), ISBN 1-59416-002-3

John Dudley wrote about the compound bow and the techniques of its use.

Richard Priestman wrote about the recurve bow and answers readers' questions about all aspects of archery. Richard is a double Olympic bronze medalist.

Roy Nash wrote about how to get the best out of yourself and your equipment.
