= Brian Potter (musician) =

American songwriter and record producer (1939–2026)

Brian August Potter (1939 – 30 June 2026) was a British-born American pop music songwriter and record producer. With his writing partner, Dennis Lambert, Potter wrote and produced hits songs for the Four Tops, Tavares, the Grass Roots, Hamilton, Joe Frank & Reynolds, Evie Sands, Coven, Hall and Oates, and Glen Campbell. Potter and Lambert were nominated for a Grammy Award for their production on Rhinestone Cowboy.

== Life and career ==
Hailing from Billericay in Essex, England, Potter began his music career in the 1960s in London. In 1969, while Dennis Lambert was in London, the two met, with Potter eventually moving to the U.S. to begin their songwriting partnership. The label Talent Associates published their hit song "One Tin Soldier", a popular anti-war anthem. When Talent Associates was put up for sale, the publishing assets were sold in 1971 to ABC-Dunhill Records and the two also joined the label, as a distinct company-within-the-company: Soldier Productions, Inc.; they also operated, under ABC, music publisher Soldier Music Company.

By 1972, they were both working for ABC Dunhill Records in Los Angeles, California, who had signed the Four Tops, after the group's decision to leave Motown Records. Lambert and Potter changed the group's sound to a West Coast R&B style, then wrote and produced the Keeper of the Castle album. Their writing credits on the album included the top-ten hits "Keeper of the Castle" and the million-seller, "Ain't No Woman (Like the One I've Got)." They continued in the same vein with follow-up albums, Main Street People (1973) and Meeting of the Minds (1974).

In 1974, Potter and Lambert began working with Glen Campbell at Capitol Records on a concept album based on the idea of an over-the-hill country musician who is uneasy about his previous fame. The effort resulted in the titular number-one single, "Rhinestone Cowboy", the success of which gave credence to claims that Potter and Lambert revived Campbell's career. The single was nominated for the Grammy Award for Record of the Year. Potter and Lambert received nominations for Producer of the Year at the 18th Annual Grammy Awards.

Potter died on 30 June 2026 at the age of 87. His death was reported by his longtime collaborator Dennis Lambert, who confirmed it to The Lost 45s. He was living with vascular dementia and Alzheimer's disease at the time of his death.

== Selected discography ==
=== Songwriting credits ===
- "Whatcha Gonna Do About It" (Small Faces, 1965)
- "One Tin Soldier" (The Original Caste, 1969; Coven, 1971; Skeeter Davis, 1972)
- "To Love You" (Country Store, 1969; Tavares, 1974)
- "It's a Cryin' Shame" (Gayle McCormick, 1971; Conway Twitty, 1972)
- "Don't Pull Your Love" (Hamilton, Joe Frank & Reynolds, 1971; Glen Campbell, 1976)
- "Two Divided by Love" and "The Runway" (The Grass Roots, 1972)
- "Ain't No Woman (Like the One I've Got)" and "Keeper of the Castle" (the Four Tops, 1972)
- "Are You Man Enough" (the Four Tops, 1973, from the film Shaft in Africa)
- "Ashes to Ashes" (The 5th Dimension, 1973)
- "Who Gets Your Love" (Dusty Springfield, 1973)
- "Rock and Roll Heaven" (the Righteous Brothers, 1974)
- "Dream On" (the Righteous Brothers, 1974; The Oak Ridge Boys, 1979)
- "Look in My Eyes Pretty Woman" (Tony Orlando & Dawn, 1974)
- "Mama's Little Girl" (Linda George, 1974) (also in the film Felicity, 1979)
- "This Heart" (Gene Redding, 1974)
- "It Only Takes a Minute" (Tavares, 1975)
- "You Brought the Woman Out of Me" (Evie Sands, 1975)
- "Country Boy (You Got Your Feet in L.A.)" (Glen Campbell, 1975)
- TunnelVision (movie soundtrack, 1976)
- "Perfect Dancer" (Marilyn McCoo, 1979)

=== Production credits ===
- Keeper of the Castle (the Four Tops, 1972)
- Cameo (Dusty Springfield, 1973)
- Hard Core Poetry (Tavares, 1974)
- In the City (Tavares, 1975)
- Rhinestone Cowboy (Glen Campbell, 1975)
- Bloodline (Glen Campbell, 1976)
- "Baby Come Back" (Player, 1977)
- Inner Secrets (Santana, 1978)
