= Yeh Dil Maange More (disambiguation) =

Yeh Dil Maange More (lit. 'This Heart Wants More' in Hindi) may refer to:

- Yeh Dil Maange More!, a 1998 advertising slogan coined for Pepsi by Anuja Chauhan
- Yeh Dil Mannge More, a 2022 Indian romantic drama television series

== See also ==
- This Heart (disambiguation)
- Dil Maange More, a 2004 Indian film
- Dil Chahta Hai (lit. 'The Heart Wants'), a 2001 Indian film by Farhan Akhtar
