= To Love You (song) =

1969 single by Country Store

Single by Country Store
- B-side: "Heartache"
- Released: November 1969
- Recorded: 1969
- Genre: Pop
- Length: 2:37
- Label: T.A.
- Songwriters: Denny Lambert; Brian Potter
- Producers: Lambert; Potter

Country Store singles chronology
"To Love You" (1969)	"Your Love (Is the Only Love)" (1970)

"To Love You" is a song by American bluegrass band Country Store. It was a standalone single and was the group's only charting hit. The song became a minor hit in the United States in late 1969 and early 1970, reaching #85 on Record World in December and #103 on Billboard in January.

== Chart history ==
Chart (1969–70)	Peak position
U.S. Billboard Hot 100	103
U.S. Record World Top 100	85

== Tavares cover ==
"To Love You" was covered by Tavares in 1974. Their version was included as the B-side of their hit, "She's Gone" (U.S. Billboard #50).
