= Gene Redding =

American singer (1945–2016)

Gene Redding (born 1945, Anderson, Indiana) was an American singer, who was discovered by Etta James at a USO Club in Anchorage, Alaska.

He released one album on Capitol Records in 1974, entitled Blood Brother. The album hit No. 45 on the Billboard R&B Albums chart on the strength of the singles "Blood Brothers" (U.S. R&B Singles #80) and "This Heart" (U.S. R&B Singles No. 31, U.S. Pop Singles #24). "This Heart" was also a hit in Canada, reaching No. 26.

Redding died on September 8, 2016.
