= Glades (band) =

Australian indie pop band

- Origin: Sydney, New South Wales, Australia
- Genres: Electronic; indie pop
- Years active: 2015–present
- Labels: EMI Music Australia
- Members: Karina Savage; Cam Robertson; Joey Wenceslao
- Website: gladesmusic.net

Glades are an Australian electronica indie pop band formed by vocalist and guitarist Karina Savage and multi-instrumentalist producers Cameron Robertson and Joseph Wenceslao at William Clarke College in Kellyville, New South Wales, in 2015. Their name comes from a ski run Robertson saw during a holiday in the snow.

== Career ==
In 2015, Glades uploaded a cover of fellow Australian Troye Sivan's "Fools" on SoundCloud and received an early endorsement from him. They signed to EMI Australia in 2016 and in October, following the breakthrough of their single "Drive", released their debut EP, This is What It's Like.

In November 2018, following the success of their biggest hit, "Do Right", EMI released Glades' debut studio album, To Love You. The supporting tour began in Melbourne on November 24 and concluded in Brisbane on December 7.

Glades' second studio album, Planetarium, was released on 30 April 2021. On 28 July 2023, a single called "Goodbyes" followed.

== Members ==
- Karina Savage – vocals, guitar
- Cam Robertson – multi-instrumentalist, production
- Joey Wenceslao – multi-instrumentalist, production

== Discography ==
=== Studio albums ===
List of studio albums, with release date and label shown
Title	Album details
To Love You	Released: 2 November 2018; Label: Glades, Warner Music Australia; Formats: CD, digital download, streaming
Planetarium	Released: 30April 2021; Label: Glades, Warner Music Australia; Formats: CD, digital download, streaming

=== Extended plays ===
List of extended plays, with release date and label shown
Title	Details
This Is What It's Like	Released: 21 October 2016; Label: Glades,EMI Australia; Formats: Digital download, streaming
Summer's for Lovers	Released: 24 November 2023; Label: Dutch Boy Records; Formats: Digital download, streaming

=== Charted and certified singles ===
List of singles, with year released, selected chart positions, certifications, and album name shown
Title	Year	Peak chart positions	Certifications	Album
Title	Year	AUS	Certifications	Album
"Do Right"	2017	51	ARIA: Gold	To Love You
