= Lion Share Studios =

Recording studio in Los Angeles, California

Coordinates: 34.0762°N 118.3691°W

- Company type: Recording studio
- Industry: Music
- Founded: 1981
- Headquarters: 8255 Beverly Boulevard, Los Angeles, U.S.
- Website: www.lionsharestudios.com

Lion Share Studios is a recording studio at 8255 Beverly Boulevard in the Hollywood neighborhood of Los Angeles, California. Established by Kenny Rogers in 1981 in the former location of the ABC Recording Studios, Lion Share has been the site of numerous hit recordings.

== History ==
=== ABC Recording Studios (1971-1979) ===
In 1971 ABC Recording Studios was founded as a division of ABC Records, who built recording studios at the ABC Records building at 8255 Beverly Boulevard in Hollywood, California for recording projects of artists on its affiliated labels, including the Four Tops, who recorded Keeper of the Castle and Main Street People at the studios, including the hit song "Ain't No Woman (Like the One I've Got)". Other artists recording at the studios include Freda Payne and Michael White. Songs recorded at the studios included Bo Donaldson and the Heywoods "Billy Don't Be a Hero" and the theme song for ABC's Happy Days television series.

Donald Fagen and Walter Becker, who were working as staff songwriters at ABC/Dunhill, began recording first Steely Dan demos after hours in the new studios in 1971, leading to ABC records signing Steely Dan to a recording contract in April 1972. The band would record Katy Lied (1975) and portions of The Royal Scam (1976) and Aja (1977) at the studios.

In 1975 Roy Halee moved to ABC Recording Studios from Columbia Recording Studios in San Francisco, to work with new acts and established ABC artists as producer, engineer or both. His first project was the Mark-Almond Band.

In 1977, ABC's studios were used to salvage Fleetwood Mac's recording of "The Chain" In 1979, in the wake of MCA Records' acquisition of ABC Records, the recording studios were closed.

=== Scott-Sunstorm (1979-1980) ===
In October 1979, Scott-Sunstorm Recording Studios, Ltd. opened at the same location with former ABC executive Gene Mackie as director of studio operations, and Natalie Cole recorded her 1980 album Don't Look Back at the studio.

=== Concorde Recording Center (1980-1981) ===
In 1980, after a complete redesign and restructuring of two of the studios, the facility was re-opened as the Concorde Recording Center, and hosted recording sessions with Parliament and Debra Laws. Kenny Rogers purchased Concorde Recording Center in May 1981 while in the process of recording portions of his Lionel Richie-produced album Share Your Love there.

=== Lion Share Studios (1981-present) ===
Rogers renamed the studios Lion's Share Recording and appointed former First Edition bandmate Terry Williams as studio manager while retaining Jay Antista, 12-year veteran engineer at ABC, Scott-Sunstorm, and Concorde, as chief maintenance engineer. Rogers wanted to transform the studio into one of the best in the area, so Williams and Antista hired Lakeside Associates and worked with Carl Yanchar to redesign Studio A around a 56-input Neve 8108 mixing console. Upon completion of the redesigned space, Kenny Rogers, Don Henley, and Carole King were among the first artists to record in the new studio.

The initial recording session for the charity single "We Are the World" took place at Lion Share Studios on January 22, 1985, when Lionel Richie, Michael Jackson, Stevie Wonder, and Quincy Jones recorded the song's backing tracks with session musicians, including John "JR" Robinson on drums, Louis Johnson on bass, and Greg Phillinganes on piano and keyboards, with engineering by Humberto Gatica. The vocals for the song were recorded 6 days later at A&M Studios.

In 2023, the studios reopened under new owner Bill Jabr, who again enlisted the design assistance of Carl Yanchar, who had been Lion Share's original studio designer in 1979.
