= Dennis Lambert =

American record producer

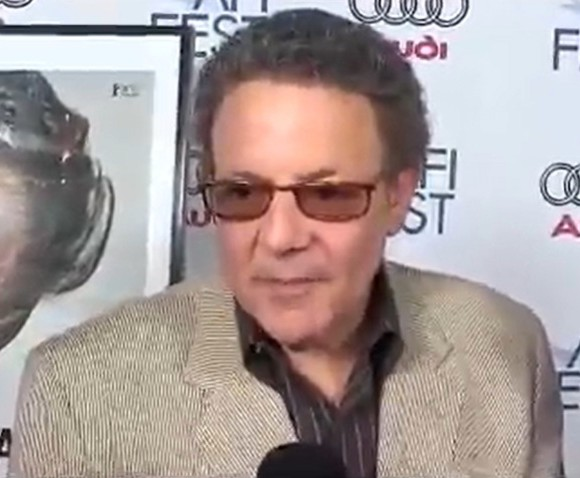
- Lambert in 2008

Background information
- Born: 1947 (age 78–79); Brooklyn, New York, United States
- Genres: Soul, blue-eyed soul, R&B, jazz rock, pop, pop rock
- Occupations: Musician, songwriter, record producer

Dennis Earle Lambert (born May 18, 1947) is an American musician, songwriter and record producer.

== Career ==
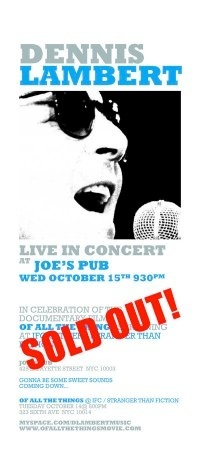
Poster from Joe's Pub New York City, 2013

Lambert was born in Brooklyn, New York. He began his music career in 1960 when he signed to Capitol Records as a recording artist. By the mid-1960s, he was writing and producing for other artists. Among his earliest work with his first main collaborator Lou Courtney were songs for Freddie & the Dreamers, Lorraine Ellison, Jerry Butler and Jerry Lee Lewis.

In 1965, Lambert joined the A&R staff of Mercury Records where he was mentored by Quincy Jones and Shelby Singleton, before joining Don Costa at DCP Records, where he ran the label's A&R department, producing and writing songs.

After a spell in the US Army during the Vietnam War, he moved to Los Angeles in 1968, and the following year, forged a successful 11-year working collaboration with British songwriter-musician Brian Potter after the two met while Lambert was in London in 1969.

Lambert and Potter joined a new record label in Los Angeles, Talent Associates, founded by producer-director Steve Binder, where they worked as producers and songwriters. They signed The Original Caste (One Tin Soldier) and worked on developing the artist roster, which included Seals and Crofts. When Talent Associates was put up for sale, the publishing assets were sold in 1971 to ABC-Dunhill Records and the two also joined the label, as a distinct company-within-the-company: Soldier Productions, Inc.; they also operated, under ABC, music publisher Soldier Music Company. They wrote and produced for the Grass Roots, Hamilton, Joe Frank & Reynolds, Gayle McCormick, the Four Tops, Original Caste, Coven, Dusty Springfield and Richard Harris, often working with A&R chief/producer Steve Barri. Lambert also released a solo album, Bags & Things in 1972.

In 1974, they formed their own record label, Haven Records, distributed by Capitol Records, with a roster that included the Righteous Brothers, the Grass Roots, Evie Sands and Player. During this period, they also wrote and produced albums for Tavares and Glen Campbell on Capitol.

Among the hit songs Lambert and Potter co-wrote and/or produced in the 1970s are "Ain't No Woman (Like the One I've Got)" (which Jay-Z later interpolated in "Ain't No Nigga") and "Keeper of the Castle" for the Four Tops; "Don't Pull Your Love" for Hamilton, Joe Frank and Reynolds, "Rhinestone Cowboy" and "Country Boy" for Glen Campbell; "It Only Takes a Minute" by Tavares; and "Baby Come Back" for Player. They produced the Righteous Brothers' major hit "Rock and Roll Heaven" which revived the duo's recording career in 1974.

In the 1980s, Lambert continued to write and produce alone under his Tuneworks banner. Credits include hits with the Commodores ("Nightshift"), Starship ("We Built This City"), the Temptations ("Love on My Mind Tonight"), Dennis Edwards ("Don't Look Any Further") and Natalie Cole ("Pink Cadillac", "I Live for Your Love").

In the 1990s, Lambert wrote and produced for Dave Koz, Little River Band, Elaine Paige and Dionne Warwick, among others. He also composed the musical score to the film directed by Edward James Olmos, American Me. In the mid-1990s, Lambert returned to New York and established Babylon Entertainment which included the record label imprint distributed by Trauma Records (BMG) and music publishing companies.

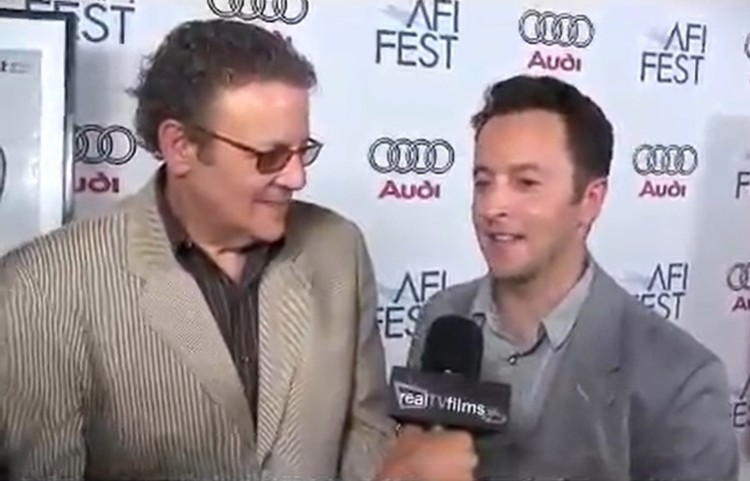
Left to right: Dennis and Jody Lambert in 2008

Lambert moved to south Florida in the 2000s and was the subject of an award-winning feature-length documentary film, Of All the Things, directed by his screenwriter son Jody Lambert, which followed him on a cross-country tour of the Philippines, where he is seen as an iconic singer-songwriter (his single "Of All the Things" is still a hit in the country even at present). In 2011, Warner Bros Pictures and Steve Carell optioned the rights to do a re-make based on Lambert's life story. Lambert and Potter also reunited to write a musical for Broadway which is in active development. Lambert has also performed live as a singer touring his show.

== Discography ==
=== Album ===
- Bags and Things (Dunhill Records, 1972)

=== Singles ===
- "Dream On" (Dunhill Records, 1972)
- "Ashes to Ashes" (Dunhill Records, 1972)
- "Of All the Things" (Dunhill Records, 1972)

=== As composer ===
- "Find My Way Back Home" (1965), The Nashville Teens
- "One Tin Soldier" (1969), The Original Caste
- "Mr. Monday" (1970), The Original Caste
- "One Tin Soldier" (1971)(1973), Coven
- "It's a Cryin' Shame" (1971), Gayle McCormick
- "Don't Pull Your Love" (1971), Hamilton, Joe Frank & Reynolds
- "Two Divided by Love" (1971), The Grass Roots
- "The Runway" (1972), The Grass Roots
- "Keeper of the Castle" (1972), Four Tops
- "Ain't No Woman (Like the One I've Got)" (1973), Four Tops
- "Are You Man Enough" (1973), Four Tops (From Shaft in Africa)
- "Put a Little Love Away" (1974), The Emotions
- "It's All Been Said Before" (1974), The Supremes
- "Look in My Eyes Pretty Woman" (1974), Tony Orlando & Dawn
- "Give It to the People" (1974), The Righteous Brothers
- "Country Boy (You Got Your Feet in L.A.)" (1975), Glen Campbell
- "It Only Takes a Minute" (1975), Tavares
- "You Brought the Woman Out of Me" (1975), Evie Sands
- "Nightshift" (1985), Commodores
- "We Built This City" (1985), Starship

=== As producer ===
- Keeper of the Castle (1972), Four Tops
- Through all Times (1973), Chuck Jackson
- Cameo (1973), Dusty Springfield
- Love Music (1973), Sergio Mendes & Brasil 77
- Living Together Growing Together (1973), The 5th Dimension
- Tony Orlando & Dawn
- "Rock and Roll Heaven" (1974), The Righteous Brothers
- Give It to the People (1974), The Righteous Brothers
- The Sons of Mrs. Righteous (1975), The Righteous Brothers
- "Blood Brothers" (1974), Gene Redding
- Hard Core Poetry (1974), Tavares
- Margie – (1975), Margie Joseph
- In the City (1975), Tavares
- Rhinestone Cowboy (album) (1976), Glen Campbell
- Bloodline (1976), Glen Campbell
- "Baby Come Back", (1977), Player
- "Don't Look Any Further" (1984), Dennis Edwards
- Nightshift (1985), The Commodores
- "Love on My Mind Tonight", The Temptations
- "Pink Cadillac"(1988), Natalie Cole
- Twice the Love album (1988) George Benson
- Jerry Butler
