= Sugar Ray discography =

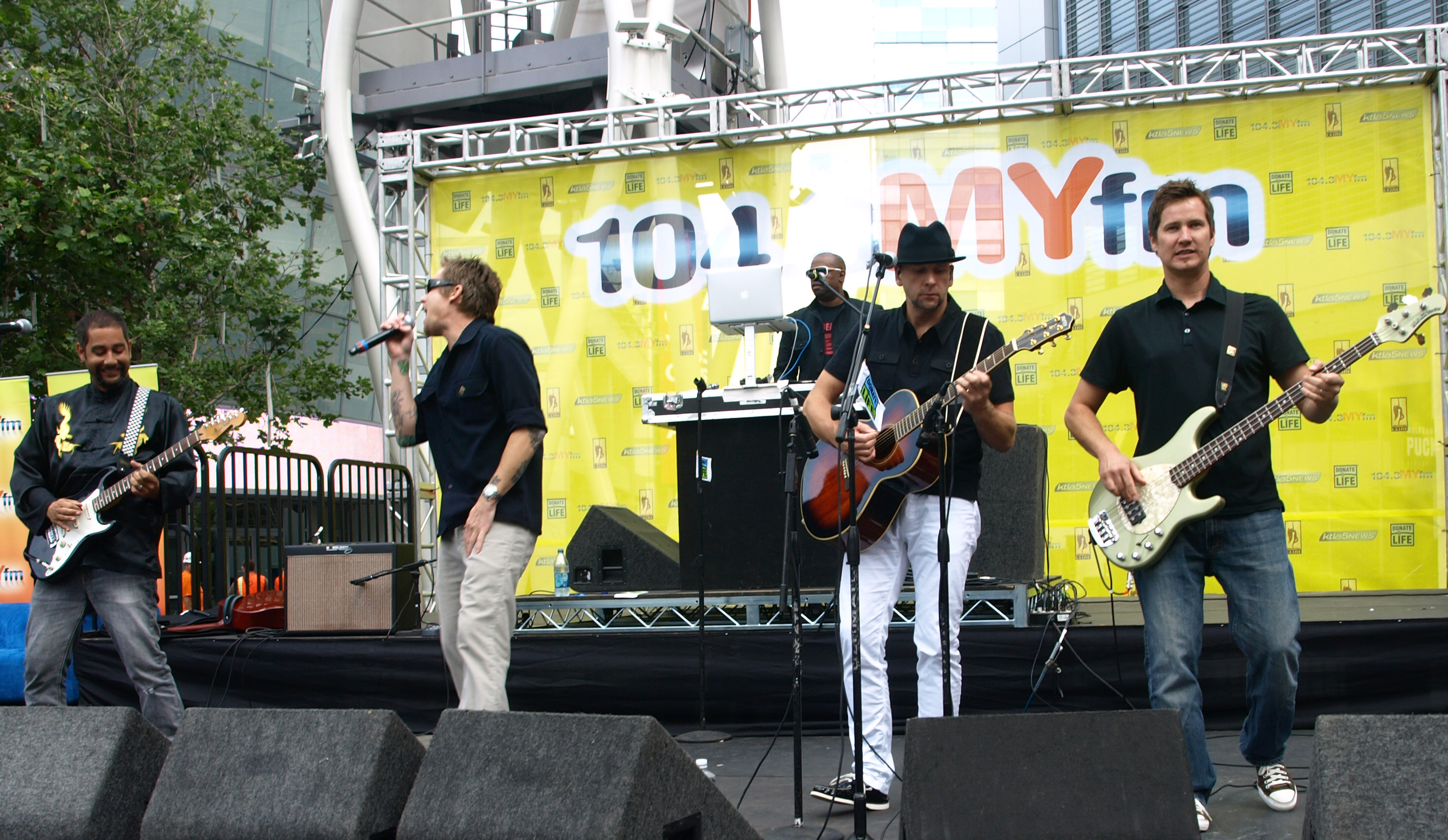
- Studio albums: 6
- Compilation albums: 2
- Singles: 19

Sugar Ray is an American alternative rock music group from Newport Beach, California. They have released a total of six studio albums, two compilation albums, and nineteen singles.

Their most successful album is 1999's 14:59, which was certified triple platinum by the Recording Industry Association of America. It features the top 10 singles "Every Morning" and "Someday". The songs peaked at number 3 and number 7 on the Billboard Hot 100, respectively.

== Studio albums ==
Title	Album details	Peak chart positions										Sales	Certifications (sales thresholds)
Title	Album details	US	AUS	AUT	CAN	FRA	GER	NZ	SWE	SWI	UK	Sales	Certifications (sales thresholds)
Lemonade and Brownies	Release date: April 4, 1995; Label: Atlantic; Formats: CD, cassette	—	—	—	—	—	—	—	48	—	—	US: 48,000	
Floored	Release date: June 24, 1997; Label: Atlantic, Lava; Formats: CD, LP, cassette	12	—	—	10	—	—	32	52	—	—	US: 1,850,000	RIAA: 2× Platinum; MC: Platinum
14:59	Release date: January 12, 1999; Label: Atlantic, Lava; Formats: CD, LP, cassette	17	19	24	15	—	88	35	—	—	60	US: 2,343,000	RIAA: 3× Platinum; ARIA: Gold
Sugar Ray	Release date: June 12, 2001; Label: Atlantic, Lava; Formats: CD, LP	6	77	54	26	109	49	12	—	53	—	US: 742,000	RIAA: Gold; MC: Gold
In the Pursuit of Leisure	Release date: June 3, 2003; Label: Atlantic; Formats: CD	29	—	—	—	—	—	—	—	—	—	US: 135,000	
Music for Cougars	Release date: July 21, 2009; Label: Pulse; Formats: CD, download	80	—	—	—	—	—	—	—	—	—		
Little Yachty	Release date: July 26, 2019; Label: BMG; Formats: CD, download	—	—	—	—	—	—	—	—	—	—		
"—" denotes releases that did not chart or were not released to that country

== Compilation albums ==
Title	Album details	Peak positions
Title	Album details	US
The Best of Sugar Ray	Release date: June 21, 2005; Label: Atlantic, Lava; Formats: CD, music download	136
Greatest Hits	Release date: October 18, 2018; Label: Razor & Tie; Formats: CD, LP, music download	—

== Singles ==
List of singles, with selected chart positions and certifications, showing year released and album name
Title	Year	Peak chart positions										Certifications	Album
Title	Year	US	US Adult	US Alt	US Pop	AUS	CAN	GER	ICE	NZ	UK	Certifications	Album
"Mean Machine"	1995	—	—	—	—	—	—	—	—	—	—		Lemonade and Brownies
"10 Seconds Down"	1995	—	—	—	—	—	—	—	—	—	—		Lemonade and Brownies
"Iron Mic"	1996	—	—	—	—	—	—	—	—	—	135		Lemonade and Brownies
"Fly" (featuring Super Cat)	1997	— (Note: "Fly" was not eligible to enter the Billboard Hot 100, but reached number 1 on the Hot 100 Airplay chart.)	2	1	1	31	1	—	21	—	58		Floored
"RPM"	1998	—	—	35	—	—	—	—	—	—	—		Floored
"Abracadabra"	1998	—	—	—	43	—	—	—	31	—	—		14:59
"Every Morning"	1999	3	1	1	1	17	1	86	21	17	10	RIAA: Gold; ARIA: Gold	14:59
"Falls Apart"	1999	29	16	5	12	54	15	—	—	33	—		14:59
"Someday"	1999	7	3	7	2	78	4	87	—	25	88		14:59
"When It's Over"	2001	13	2	—	7	34	4	68	—	6	32		Sugar Ray
"Answer the Phone"	2001	— (Note: "Answer the Phone" did not enter the Billboard Hot 100, but peaked at number 12 on the Bubbling Under Hot 100 chart.)	33	—	39	68	—	—	—	40	—		Sugar Ray
"Ours"	2002	—	—	—	—	—	—	—	—	—	—		Sugar Ray
"Mr. Bartender (It's So Easy)"	2003	—	20	—	—	85	—	—	—	—	—		In the Pursuit of Leisure
"Is She Really Going Out with Him?"	2003	—	19	—	—	—	—	—	—	—	—		In the Pursuit of Leisure
"Shot of Laughter"	2005	—	— (Note: "Shot of Laughter" did not enter the Adult Pop Charts, but peaked at number 40 on the Adult Contemporary chart.)	—	—	—	—	—	—	—	—		The Best of Sugar Ray
"Into Yesterday"	2007	—	—	—	—	—	—	—	—	—	—		Surf's Up: Music from the Motion Picture
"Boardwalk"	2009	—	—	—	—	—	—	—	—	—	—		Music for Cougars
"Make It Easy"	2019	—	—	—	—	—	—	—	—	—	—		Little Yachty
"—" denotes releases that did not chart or were not released to that country
