= Mean Machine =

Mean Machine may refer to:

== Music ==
- Mean Machine (Lucifer's Friend album)
- Mean Machine (U.D.O. album)
- Mean Machine (band), a Japanese rock band
- The Mean Machine (rap group)
- "Mean Machine", a song by The Last Poets on the album This Is Madness
- "Mean Machine", a song by Sugar Ray on the album Lemonade and Brownies
- "Mean Machine", a song by Motörhead on the album Orgasmatron
- The Mean Machine (album), an album by Jimmy McGriff

== Sport ==
- Mean Machine (sailing team)
- Roy Shaw (1936–2012), British boxer
- Mean Machine RFC, a rugby club in the Kenya Rugby Football Union
- Football teams in The Longest Yard, and its 2005 remake
- A 1982 Commonwealth Games relay team including Graeme Brewer, Neil Brooks, Greg Fasala, and Michael Delany

== Other uses ==
- Mean Machine (film), a 2001 British sports comedy film
- Mean Machine Angel, a character in the Judge Dredd universe
- "Mean Machine," a Hi Hi Puffy AmiYumi episode
- The Mean Machine, Dick Dastardly's car in the TV series Wacky Races
