= Music for Cougars =

Studio album by Sugar Ray
- Released: July 21, 2009
- Recorded: September 2008–March 2009
- Studio: Pulse Recording Studios (Silver Lake, California)
- Genre: Pop rock
- Length: 42:04
- Label: Pulse
- Producer: Josh Abraham, Steve Fox, Stan Frazier, Tim Pagnotta, S*A*M and Sluggo, Luke Walker

Sugar Ray chronology
The Best of Sugar Ray (2005)	Music for Cougars (2009)	Little Yachty (2019)

Music for Cougars is the sixth studio album by American rock band Sugar Ray, released on July 21, 2009. It is the group's last album to feature turntablist Craig "DJ Homicide" Bullock, bassist Murphy Karges and drummer Stan Frazier before their departures in August 2010 and early 2012, respectively.

== Background and music ==
In the six-year gap between Music for Cougars and Sugar Ray's previous album In the Pursuit of Leisure, some of the band members started families, while singer Mark McGrath began focusing on roles in the media industry. This included a role as host of entertainment news program Extra, which he began in 2004. During the break, the band continued to play a handful of shows a year, and when McGrath's role on Extra finished in 2008, it freed up time for the band to record another album. On Extra, McGrath was replaced as host by former Saved by the Bell actor Mario Lopez. Music for Cougars was Sugar Ray's first album to not be released on a major label, as they departed Atlantic Records in 2006, following the release of a greatest hits compilation in 2005. They would later return to a major label for 2019's Little Yachty, which was distributed via BMG.

Since they were no longer working with a major label on Music for Cougars, the band said they had less pressure on them than with previous albums. Sugar Ray felt as though they needed help getting back into a "groove" with the album, after being largely inactive for the past few years, so they enlisted the help of outside writers, including Paul Weber of their new label Pulse. Guitarist Rodney Sheppard said that they "collaborated a lot" with Weber, and that he was "responsible for kicking the cobwebs off our songwriting abilities". The band were pleased with the overall outcome of the music, with Sheppard saying in 2009 that he considers it to be his "second or third favorite" of their records.

Music for Cougars includes a cover of an unreleased Weezer song called "Love is the Answer". Sugar Ray had shared occasional bills with Weezer beginning in the mid-1990s, and in 1997 they recorded a song called "Rivers", which was an ode to Weezer frontman Rivers Cuomo, and written in the style of a Weezer song. It appeared on the soundtrack album of the horror film Scream 2 (1997), in addition to appearing in the credits of that film. Regarding "Love Is the Answer", Sheppard said in 2009 "it was so surreal for us; we've been huge fans of Weezer since the first record. On the Scream 2 soundtrack, we had a song that we named 'Rivers'. So years down the line, to actually have a contribution from him is so amazing for us." A few months after Music for Cougars was released, Weezer decided to include their own version of "Love Is the Answer" on their seventh studio album Raditude.

The track "She’s Got the (Woo-Hoo)" includes the lyric "She comes when she's ready/She's Sex and the City/She'll bring you to your knees", which lyrically parodies the television series Sex and the City. When asked what the song's title meant, McGrath replied in 2009, "well, really you can't be so literal. If you make it so obvious there's no song. Whatever floats your boat. Whatever woo-hoo you need. I mean, it could be about your dog, you know?."

=== Title ===
The title references the largely female fanbase Sugar Ray started attracting following the release of their 1997 album Floored. In 2009, McGrath told Rolling Stone that he became inspired to use this title after a friend of his brought up their crowd demographics at a show. The show was an outdoor performance at a mall, with McGrath remembering, "we were playing at the Grove [mall] here in Hollywood, a funny gig on a Sunday, people walking by with strollers. And a friend of ours goes, 'All your fans are cougars'. That’s fucking brilliant." McGrath added that, "to me 'cougars' is an empowering word. It’s like role reversal. Cougars are proud, they take care of themselves and they know what they want." Regarding their audience, Rodney Sheppard said in 2009 "for the most part, we’ve always had a real variety, from skinheads with mohawks, to moms with their daughters. Granted, the majority is women in their 30s and 40s seeing us." Sheppard also said that "we don’t want to exclude the guys who still come out, and some kids. We're curious to see how young of an audience we can attract now."

The album was released during a period when interest in the term 'cougar' was increasing in the media, with the Courteney Cox sitcom Cougar Town premiering on ABC in September 2009, just two months after Music for Cougars was released. McGrath said in 2009 that the album title led to people considering him as a "guru" on cougar culture. He adds, "the irony of that is, I'm 41. I'm certainly not any cougar’s prize."

== Commercial performance ==
The album was not as successful commercially as previous Sugar Ray albums. It reached number eighty on the Billboard 200 chart, with none of the album's three singles charting. Shortly before the album's release, McGrath told the New York Post that "there are no commercial concerns for Sugar Ray now. Sure we'd love to sell a million records, who wouldn't? But look, when a U2 record and a Guns N' Roses record both [recently] fail commercially, it’s far from us to think we can sell millions."

== Reception ==
Professional ratings
Aggregate scores
Source	Rating
Metacritic	54/100
Review scores
Source	Rating
AllMusic	3.5/5 stars
Billboard	3/5 stars
Entertainment Weekly	B
L.A. Times	2/4 stars
PopMatters	4/10
Rolling Stone	2/5 stars

Stephen Thomas Erlewine of AllMusic awarded the album three-and-half out of five stars. He wrote "they make no bones about making Music for Cougars, those cougars being the very girls that shook their hips to 'Fly' back in 1997 and are looking for a little bit of the same breezy vibe 12 years later, a little bit of sexy nostalgia to get them through their summer, a soundtrack to a few girls' nights out." Erlewine also noted the heavy usage of autotune on Music for Cougars, remarking that "like the titular aging sex kittens, Sugar Ray can sometimes try too hard to seem younger than their years, pushing the dance beats a little bit too hard, and Mark McGrath relies on some unseemly Auto-Tune, but even with this too-evident aural botox, the group remains a guilty pleasure that's a bit hard to resist." Christian Hoard of Rolling Stone gave it two out of five stars in August 2009, commenting that "McGrath's taste for simple melody might someday help him pen a country hit or two." Billboard claimed in 2009 that it "marks a return to the tried-and-true formula that made 1997's 'Fly' a radio staple."

Entertainment Weekly's Leah Greenblatt gave it a B rating and also compared it their previous material, writing that they are "still churning out affable pop-rock for various beer-commercial activities (beach volleyball, slo-mo water-balloon fights)." Brian McElhiney of The Daily Gazette said in August 2009 that the album title "seems appropriate, after all, the younger female audience the southern California group began cultivating with its 1997 breakout smash hit 'Fly' and other subsequent breezy summer anthems have all grown up along with the band." However, he added that "from the sugar-coated pop that broke them, to the band’s early funk-metal freakouts — it’s hard for even the band's members to know just what audience will come out to the shows."

== Track listing ==
1. "Girls Were Made to Love" (featuring Collie Buddz) (includes a sample from Eddie Hodges' "(Girls, Girls, Girls) Made to Love", 1962) – 3:38
2. "Boardwalk" – 3:26
3. "She's Got the (Woo-Hoo)" – 3:35
4. "Love Is the Answer" (cover of a previously unreleased Weezer track, written by and featuring Rivers Cuomo; later reworked and re-recorded for Weezer's Raditude) – 3:57
5. "Rainbow" – 3:17
6. "Closer" – 3:33
7. "When We Were Young" – 3:21
8. "Going Nowhere" – 2:49
9. "Love 101" – 3:17
10. "Last Days" – 3:33
11. "Morning Sun" – 3:44
12. "Dance Like No One's Watchin'" (featuring Donavon Frankenreiter) – 3:53

== Charts ==
Chart (2009)	Peak position
US Billboard 200	80
US Independent Albums (Billboard)	15
US Top Rock Albums (Billboard)	37
