= Little Yachty (album) =

Studio album by Sugar Ray
- Released: July 26, 2019
- Genre: Yacht rock
- Length: 37:46
- Label: BMG
- Producers: Michael Lloyd, Sam Hollander, and Harry Fraud

Sugar Ray chronology
| Music for Cougars (2009) | Little Yachty (2019) |

Little Yachty is the seventh studio album by American rock band Sugar Ray, released on July 26, 2019, through BMG. It is their first album in 10 years, following 2009's Music for Cougars, with lead singer Mark McGrath and guitarist Rodney Sheppard being the only original members of the band to appear.

== Background ==
The album's title is a reference to both the yacht rock musical genre and the rapper Lil Yachty. Lil Yachty was born in 1997, the same year Sugar Ray's first hit, "Fly", was released, and when GQ asked McGrath if he had heard a reaction from him, McGrath said, "I wanted to be the first to let him know that this was happening. And I was hoping he would be cool with it and had a sense of humor. And he hit me back on Twitter and said, 'Oh, bro, you guys are legends and if we can ever jam, I'd love to jam with you guys some day.' So I'm so happy to get his co-sign on it because if it bummed him out, that would have bummed me out." In another interview with Forbes, McGrath explained that he grew up listening to yacht rock music, saying that "if you look at the '90s and the hits we have they're sort of yacht rocky for the times. There's a beach feel to them, certainly a summery vibe to them. So when we went into making this record we said, 'Let's make the most Sugar Ray sounding record we can.' And we started messing around with it. And the more I was listening to what we were putting together the more yacht rocky it felt."

The album is a continuation of the lighter sound the band has had since 1999's 14:59. McGrath said to GQ, "as a 51-year-old man, I have no interest in going backwards and playing down tunes, rad rock, or anything of that nature. I've kind of been there and done that." Regarding his expectations for the album, McGrath added, "my hopes for the record are already met. We made a record and it's coming out. So it's done."

== Reception ==
Professional ratings
Review scores
| Source | Rating |
|---|---|
| AllMusic | 3.5/5 stars |

AllMusic's Stephen Thomas Erlewine gave the album three and a half out of five stars, writing that "down to a duo of Mark McGrath and Rodney Sheppard, Sugar Ray rebrand themselves as a breezy pop group with Little Yachty. As its winking title suggests, Little Yachty is indebted to the cool, smooth sounds of Yacht Rock, that specific brand of '70s soft rock that's tied to the sea", adding that "McGrath and Sheppard are all in on the soft rock vibe — [they] resolutely refuse to crank their amplifiers." Erlewine also noted that, "It's a long way from the punk-funk of Lemonade and Brownies, but not too far removed from Music for Cougars." Matt Coker of the OC Weekly wrote in August 2019 that the band has "changed from funk punk to hardcore punk to hair metal to funk metal to rap rock to power pop to whatever else was getting airplay at the moment", adding that with the album, "Sugar Ray latched onto another new sound: yacht rock." He went on to write that the album is "not horrible", saying that "'Trouble' sounds like something you’d hear from a young country act attempting to crossover into pop, while 'Good Good Loving' could be a solid track for a boy band pushing boundaries into ska."

In 2023, American Songwriter placed "Make It Easy" fifth on their list of the top 10 Sugar Ray songs.

== Track listing ==
All tracks produced by Michael Lloyd, except where noted.

| No. | Title | Writer(s) | Producer(s) | Length |
|---|---|---|---|---|
| 1. | "Highest Tree" | Rodney Sheppard; Mark McGrath; James Ide | | 3:19 |
| 2. | "Coconut Bay" | McGrath; Sheppard; Sam Hollander; Dean Butterworth; Grant Michaels | Sam Hollander; Grant Michaels | 3:25 |
| 3. | "Good Good Lovin" | Rory Quigley; McGrath; Sheppard; Nicholas Daniel Andre; Russ Mitkowski; Benjamin Yavel | Harry Fraud | 3:13 |
| 4. | "Trouble" | Sheppard; McGrath; Tim Hutton | | 3:28 |
| 5. | "Sunday Love" | Sheppard; McGrath; Butterworth; Kristian Attard | | 3:33 |
| 6. | "Perfect Mornings" | McGrath | | 2:30 |
| 7. | "All of the Time" | Attard; McGrath | | 3:51 |
| 8. | "What the World Needs" | Sheppard; McGrath; Butterworth; Attard | | 3:44 |
| 9. | "Make It Easy" | Sheppard; McGrath | | 3:09 |
| 10. | "Escape (The Piña Colada Song)" | Rupert Holmes | | 4:04 |
| 11. | "California Gold" | McGrath; Sheppard; Hollander; Butterworth; Michaels | Hollander; Michaels | 3:30 |
