= Sugar Ray (album) =

Studio album by Sugar Ray
- Released: June 12, 2001
- Recorded: 2000 – March 2001
- Studios: NRG (Hollywood, California); Henson (Hollywood, California); Bulletproof; Soundcastle
- Genre: Power pop
- Length: 39:55
- Labels: Atlantic; Lava
- Producers: Don Gilmore; David Kahne; Ralph Sall

Sugar Ray chronology
14:59 (1999)	Sugar Ray (2001)	In the Pursuit of Leisure (2003)

Singles from Sugar Ray
- 1. "When It's Over" Released: May 7, 2001; 2. "Answer the Phone" Released: September 24, 2001; 3. "Ours" Released: January 7, 2002

Sugar Ray is the fourth studio album by American rock band Sugar Ray, released on June 12, 2001. It debuted at number 6 on the Billboard 200 chart, and went gold. The album's first single, "When It's Over", also performed well on pop and rock charts.

== Background ==
In a June 2001 interview with Rolling Stone, singer Mark McGrath talked about the album, saying that "every song is about relationships", and that "I think it has to do with — I hate to say this — we're getting a little bit older. In the past the band has hid behind feelings and things like that by writing sex, drugs and rock & roll-type songs." Regarding working with a new producer in Don Gilmore, McGrath said, "it was like cutting the umbilical cord with [previous producer] David Kahne. He was really instrumental in any success we had." McGrath added that, "we got back to sort of an organic sound — guitar, bass, drums — and explored that a little bit." Working titles for the album included A Clone Again Naturally, Chicken Lips and Just to Be Nominated. McGrath said to Rolling Stone, "the record just ended up naming itself. But we did try to name it. I want people to know that. We tried to, just nothing worked, man."

== Music ==
The album is a continuation of the more melodic sound of their third release, 14:59. It features elements of arena rock, country, funk, hip hop, power pop, punk, reggae and R&B. In 2019, WGN described it as "catchy and surprisingly eclectic".

The penultimate track "Just a Little" incorporates elements of country music. Sugar Ray had previously done a country song called "One Brave Cowboy", which appeared as a hidden track on their debut Lemonade and Brownies. The closing track "Disasterpiece" was written in the style of a Rolling Stones song, with drummer Stan Frazier calling it "a straight-up tribute to The Stones." It is conceptually similar to Sugar Ray's song "Rivers" from the Scream 2 soundtrack, which was also written in the style of another band (in that case, Weezer). "Stay On" has a reggae/ska sound similar to some of the band's earlier work, while the third and final single "Ours" has an R&B-influenced sound. A friend of DJ Homicide had initially brought "Ours" to the band, and the other members were excited about using it, since they thought it had the potential to become a hit. However, it failed when released as a single in 2002 and was never performed live. Bassist Murphy Karges said in 2019 that it sounded like a hit when they heard the original version, adding that when they recorded the song, "it just didn't fit our band". The song is lyrically about a woman who has cheated on two men; the narrator of the song considers her to be his "girl" and the other man considers her to be his "woman", with the narrator of the song saying that this makes her the "queen of two worlds" and "ours". The song includes a line about the narrator having a latte with this woman, even though McGrath didn't drink lattes. Karges said this was since McGrath was telling a story in the song, rather than writing the lyrics from a personal perspective. The song also includes the line "Shut up the situation / Like a Springer episode", which is a reference to The Jerry Springer Show. "Under the Sun" lyrically revolves around the nostalgia the band had for the 1980s, when they were in their teens and early 20s. It references some of the punk, hip hop and new wave artists that they were listening to during that time, such as the Clash, Culture Club, Men Without Hats and Run-DMC. It also references the KROQ station, which the band members grew up listening to in Southern California.

The second single "Answer the Phone" is described as a pop punk song, and originated while the band were doing pre-production work on the album at Karges's garage in Costa Mesa, California. MTV Cribs filmed them as they working on the song. Karges said that MTV Cribs had only just begun at that point, and hadn't yet become synonymous with large mansions owned by celebrities.

For "Stay On", the band got 311 singer Nick Hexum to make a guest appearance. 311 were friends with Sugar Ray and had previously done an American tour with them and Incubus in 1997. The bassline for "Stay On" was written by guitarist Rodney Sheppard, while Stan Frazier wrote the song's hook. It was Frazier's idea to bring Hexum on as a guest.

== Touring and promotion ==
After the album was released, Sugar Ray spent two months touring the U.S. with country/hip hop artist Uncle Kracker and TheStart. During this tour, they performed covers of "We're Not Gonna Take It" by glam metal band Twisted Sister and "The Bad Touch" by the Bloodhound Gang, who Sugar Ray had been friends with for several years. For intro music during their shows, the band used "Never, Never Gonna Give Ya Up" by soul singer Barry White. On November 1, 2001, the band performed the single "Answer the Phone" on The Tonight Show with Jay Leno. On April 6, 2002, they performed at the annual Benefit Concert For Earth Day in Houston, Texas. The lineup that year also included Natalie Imbruglia, Remy Zero, Shaggy, Sheryl Crow and Vanessa Carlton.

The track "Sorry Now" was featured in the 2001 film Scary Movie 2. Coincidentally, in 1997 the band had also contributed music to the second film in the Scream franchise, which the Scary Movie franchise was a parody of. "Under the Sun" appeared at the beginning of the Roswell episode "Busted", which aired in October 2001. It was the second time the band's music appeared on the show, with the 14:59 single "Someday" appearing in another Roswell episode two years earlier. In 2002, the single "When It's Over" appeared in the romantic comedy film The Sweetest Thing. That same year, another track from the album titled "Words to Me" was featured on the soundtrack release for the Scooby-Doo film. This song and Sugar Ray themselves appeared in the Scooby-Doo film, with it being their second acting appearance in a Hollywood picture, having previously appeared in 1997's Fathers' Day. Both of these films were produced by Warner Bros. Pictures, which was then part of the same corporate conglomerate as Warner Music Group (parent of the band's label Atlantic Records). The Scooby-Doo film was shot in Australia, primarily on Moreton Island, which in the film was titled "Spooky Island". The island is situated off the coast of Queensland in the Coral Sea, a marginal sea of the South Pacific Ocean. While in Australia, Sugar Ray performed a beach concert that would later be released on a DVD called Music in High Places: Live from Australia. In a 2016 interview with the HuffPost, McGrath reflected on their role in Scooby-Doo, saying "it was off the coast of Australia on some island. There was a whole Scooby-Doo set. We were there for about a week and there were all these beautiful extras. They partied every night." In another 2022 interview with Screen Rant, McGrath said that he and his bandmates grew up watching Scooby-Doo as children in the 1970s, adding that "we lived on the set of Spooky Island with all the extras and all the cast for five insane, party-fueled days. It was unbelievable. Australians know how to get down and party."

In 2001, music videos were shot for the singles "Answer the Phone" and "When It's Over". That year, an animated version of "When It's Over" was also made by Cartoon Network, which at the time was another sister company to Warner Music Group. The animated version appeared on Cartoon Network's official website. For this video, the band members were animated in the style of the Hanna-Barbera shows which aired on Cartoon Network.

== Commercial performance ==
The album sold 500,000 copies, less than the multi-platinum albums Floored and 14:59, but far more than their next album, 2003's In the Pursuit of Leisure, which sold fewer than 150,000 copies.

== Reception ==
Professional ratings
Aggregate scores
Source	Rating
Metacritic	71/100
Review scores
Source	Rating
AllMusic	4/5 stars
Christgau's Consumer Guide	(dud)
E!	B−
Entertainment Weekly	B−
Kerrang!	3/5 stars
Los Angeles Times	2.5/4 stars
Q	4/5 stars
Rolling Stone	3.5/5 stars
The Rolling Stone Album Guide	3/5 stars
Spin	6/10

Sugar Ray received generally positive reviews. Aggregator Metacritic gave the album a 71 out of 100 rating based on 10 reviews, indicating "generally favorable reviews". Rolling Stone's Arion Berger had a positive review, remarking that "Sugar Ray drifts further from the group's early aggro-pop sound; it's about girls and fun, cushy with melodies and McGrath's earthy, inconsistent vocals. Their laid-back attitude is infectiously unfussy." The Bangor Daily News wrote in August 2001 that, "the punchy speed punk-funk act from Orange County of five years ago is gone, having been officially replaced by a ballad-driven, radio friendly power pop band."

PopMatters wrote in their June 2001 review that, "in the course of [their] evolution, they traversed styles as diverse as punk/metal, ska/reggae, surf-rock, and even what their original harder-edged fans dismissed as fluffy 'sissy girl' rock. While many hardcore early fans found these changes upsetting, it hasn't hurt the band's popularity." They add, "factor in the teenage girls, for one thing. Pretty boy lead singer Mark McGrath looks like he could be equally at home as a cast member of Dawson's Creek or on the cover of Maxim or GQ. He's not just a pretty face. Mark and his fellow Sugar Ray compatriots are as crafty as they get [and] touring has translated into musical growth." Billboard's June 2001 review states that, "this is the album Sugar Ray has been inching to record since its 1997 break-out hit Floored", adding that "Sugar Ray shows the quintet honing a hybrid of hip hop, funk, arena rock and pop — coated with an ample dose of frat-boy humor and teen-dream romance."

In 2001, the Sarasota Herald-Tribune considered it to be a return to the band's rock roots, saying that the "rock influence influence can be felt on Karges' opening chords in 'Answer the Phone' and in 'Disasterpiece', which pays tribute to The Greatest Rock Band That Ever Lived (with a stolen Keith Richards riff)". The Michigan Daily also compared the guitar work in "Disasterpiece" to the Rolling Stones, but considered it to go in more of a pop direction than the Rolling Stones. They further state that, "the band is not without talent, though Mark McGrath is definitely not the best voice in rock. But MTV and teenage girls like boys who look good. The real problem, however, is that most of the songs on this CD seem stolen or recycled." Entertainment Weekly wrote that the album "is being touted as their return to 'rock', but aside from two or three beefier-than-usual riff-fests, it's essentially more of the same."

== Track listing ==
No.	Title	Writer(s)	Producer	Length
1.	"Answer the Phone"	Murphy Karges; Stan Frazier; Mark McGrath; Don Gilmore	Don Gilmore	4:00
2.	"When It's Over"	Frazier; Rodney Sheppard; McGrath; Craig Bullock; David Kahne	David Kahne	3:38
3.	"Under the Sun"	Frazier; M. Karges; McGrath; Gilmore; Terry Karges	Gilmore	3:21
4.	"Satellites"	McGrath; Bullock; Frazier; M. Karges; Sheppard; Gilmore	Gilmore	3:46
5.	"Waiting"	Frazier; M. Karges; McGrath; Gilmore		3:31
6.	"Ours"	Bullock; McGrath; Sheppard; Frazier; M. Karges; A. L. Miller; K. L. Maxwell	Kahne	3:23
7.	"Sorry Now"	Frazier; McGrath; Gilmore	Gilmore	3:17
8.	"Stay On" (featuring Nick Hexum)	Frazier; Sheppard; M. Karges; Bullock; Nick Hexum	Gilmore	4:31
9.	"Words to Me"	Frazier; McGrath; Sheppard; Joseph McGinty Nichol	Ralph Sall	4:00
10.	"Just a Little"	McGrath; Sheppard	Gilmore	3:27
11.	"Disasterpiece"	Frazier; M. Karges; McGrath; Sheppard; Gilmore	Gilmore	2:58
Total length:				39:55

== Personnel ==
Sugar Ray

- Mark McGrath – lead vocals, rhythm guitar
- Rodney Sheppard – lead guitar, backing vocals
- Murphy Karges – bass, guitar, backing vocals
- Stan Frazier – drums, percussion, guitar, programming, backing vocals
- Craig "DJ Homicide" Bullock – turntables, samples, programming, keyboards, backing vocals

Technical personnel

- Daniel M. Certa – additional engineering and assistance (1, 3–5, 7, 8, 10, 11)
- Richard Davis – Pro-tools (9)
- John Ewing Jr. – engineer (1, 3–5, 7, 8, 10, 11)
- Steve Gallagher – engineer (1, 3–5, 7, 8, 10, 11)
- Don Gilmore – mixing (7, 10, 11), engineer (1, 3–5, 7, 8, 10, 11), additional recording (6)
- David Kahne – programming and mixing (2, 6)
- Steve Kaplan – assistant mix engineer (1, 3–5, 8)
- David Leonard – mixing (2, 6)
- Chris Lord-Alge – mixing (1, 3–5, 8)
- Steve Marcussen – mastering
- Eddie Miller – engineer (9)
- Ralph Sall – mixing (9)
- Matt Silva – mixing assistant (1, 3–5, 8)
- Alex "Odd Job" Uychocde – assistant mix engineer (2, 6)

Additional musicians

- Emanuel Dean – additional keyboards on "Ours"
- William Francis – additional guitars on "Disasterpiece"
- Nick Hexum – additional vocals on "Stay On"
- Dave Holdredge – additional guitar on "Ours"
- Greg Kurstin – keyboards on "Words To Me"
- John "Juke" Logan – harmonica on "Disasterpiece"
- JayDee Maness – pedal steel guitar on "Just a Little"

== Charts ==
=== Weekly charts ===
Weekly chart performance for Sugar Ray
Chart (2001)	Peak position
Australian Albums (ARIA)	77
Austrian Albums (Ö3 Austria)	54
French Albums (SNEP)	109
German Albums (Offizielle Top 100)	49
New Zealand Albums (RMNZ)	12
Swiss Albums (Schweizer Hitparade)	53
US Billboard 200	6

=== Year-end charts ===
Year-end chart performance for Sugar Ray
Chart (2001)	Position
US Billboard 200	142

== Certifications ==
Certifications for Sugar Ray
Region	Certification	Certified units/sales
Canada (Music Canada)	Gold	50,000^{^}
United States (RIAA)	Gold	500,000^{^}
^{^} Shipments figures based on certification alone.
