= When It's Over (Sugar Ray song) =

2001 single by Sugar Ray

- Commercial European artwork

Single by Sugar Ray

from the album Sugar Ray
- Released: May 7, 2001
- Studio: Jim Henson (Los Angeles)
- Length: 3:39
- Label: Atlantic; Lava
- Songwriters: Stan Frazier; Rodney Sheppard; Mark McGrath; Craig Bullock; David Kahne
- Producer: David Kahne

Sugar Ray singles chronology
"Someday" (1999)	"When It's Over" (2001)	"Answer the Phone" (2001)

Alternative cover
- Promotional US artwork

Music video
- "When It's Over" on YouTube

"When It's Over" is a song by American rock band Sugar Ray. It was released to all radio formats on May 7, 2001, as the lead single from their self-titled fourth album (2001). The song reached number six in New Zealand, number 13 on the US Billboard Hot 100, and number 32 on the UK Singles Chart.

== Music video ==
"When It's Over" is a song about having feelings for a person after the end of a relationship in which there were repeated breakups before. The music video (directed by McG) features segments of each band member's fantasy about a music video for the song, ending with the band partying and riding scooters on the beach. Stan Frazier's portion is first, and consists of the band performing on a soundstage which he then destroys. Murphey Karges' portion is next, and shows the band performing in a club as an Irish punk rock group. DJ Homicide's portion shows the group visiting a strip club. Rodney Sheppard's segment portrays his love of kung fu, as he fights Kareem Abdul-Jabbar as Bruce Lee in his yellow jumpsuit in an imitation of their fight in Game of Death. Mark McGrath's segment is last, and has the band in the 1980s imitating Duran Duran's "Is There Something I Should Know?" music video, incorporating elements of "I Ran (So Far Away)" by A Flock of Seagulls and "Cars" by Gary Numan. Sugar Ray's mascot, the bulldog, is also shown at the end of the music video in a brief cameo. A scooter accident can be seen near the end of the video (right).

A different music video aired on Cartoon Network, directed by Mark Marek and Ric Heitzman, with the band members depicted as cartoon characters. Frazier was dressed as George Jetson from The Jetsons and playing golf, while McGrath was playing basketball. This video premiered on June 4, 2001.

== Track listings ==
European and Australian CD single

1. "When It's Over" (album version) – 3:40
2. "Someday" (live acoustic) – 3:42
3. "Every Morning" (live acoustic) – 3:16

German CD single

1. "When It's Over" (album version) – 3:35
2. "Every Morning" (live acoustic) – 3:16

== Credits and personnel ==
Credits are lifted from the Sugar Ray album booklet.

Studios

- Recorded at Jim Henson Studios (Los Angeles)
- Mixed at Scream Studios (Los Angeles)
- Mastered at Marcussen Mastering (Hollywood, California)

Personnel

- Stan Frazier – writing
- Rodney Sheppard – writing
- Mark McGrath – writing
- Craig Bullock – writing
- David Kahne – writing, production, programming, mixing
- David Leonard – mixing
- Alex "Odd Job" Uychocde – engineering assistance
- Steve Marcussen – mastering

== Charts ==
=== Weekly charts ===
Chart (2001)	Peak position
Australia (ARIA)	34
Canada CHR (Nielsen BDS)	3
Germany (GfK)	68
Italy (FIMI)	49
New Zealand (Recorded Music NZ)	6
Scottish Singles Sales (Official Charts)	31
UK Singles (Official Charts)	32
US Billboard Hot 100	13
US Adult Alternative Airplay (Billboard)	16
US Adult Contemporary (Billboard)	28
US Adult Pop Airplay (Billboard)	2
US Pop Airplay (Billboard)	7

=== Year-end charts ===
Chart (2001)	Position
Canada Radio (Nielsen BDS)	17
New Zealand (RIANZ)	24
US Billboard Hot 100	46
US Adult Top 40 (Billboard)	8
US Mainstream Top 40 (Billboard)	28

Chart (2002)	Position
US Adult Top 40 (Billboard)	50

== Release history ==
Region	Date	Format(s)	Label(s)	Ref.
United States	May 7, 2001	All radio formats	Atlantic; Lava	
Australia	May 28, 2001	CD	Atlantic; Lava	
Japan	May 30, 2001	CD	EastWest Japan	
United Kingdom	October 8, 2001	CD; cassette	Atlantic; Lava	
