= Stan Frazier =

Stan Frazier may refer to:

- Stan Frazier (musician) (born 1968), American musician, recording artist, music producer, and restaurateur
- Uncle Elmer (Stan C. Frazier) (1937 – 1992), American professional wrestler
