= Answer the Phone =

2001 single by Sugar Ray

Single by Sugar Ray

from the album Sugar Ray
- Released: September 24, 2001
- Genre: Pop-punk; power pop
- Length: 3:59
- Label: Atlantic; Lava
- Songwriters: Mark McGrath; Stan Frazier; Murphy Karges; Don Gilmore
- Producer: Don Gilmore

Sugar Ray singles chronology
"When It's Over" (2001)	"Answer the Phone" (2001)	"Ours" (2002)

Music video
- "Answer the Phone" on YouTube

"Answer the Phone" is a song by the American rock band Sugar Ray. It was released on September 24, 2001, via Atlantic Records and Lava Records as the second single from their self-titled fourth studio album. It is a pop-punk song that was written by Mark McGrath, Stan Frazier, Murphy Karges, and Don Gilmore and produced by the latter.

== Track listing ==
US CD single
No.	Title	Length
1.	"Answer the Phone" (intro edit)	3:45
2.	"Answer the Phone" (intro bridge edit)	3:31
3.	"Answer the Phone" (album version)	3:59

Germany CD single
No.	Title	Length
1.	"Answer the Phone" (album version)	3:58
2.	"Answer the Phone" (edit 1)	3:45
3.	"Answer the Phone" (edit 2)	3:31

Australia CD single
No.	Title	Length
1.	"Answer the Phone" (album version)	3:58
2.	"Falls Apart" (live from Spain)	4:26
3.	"Fly" (live from Spain)

== Charts ==
Chart (2001–2002)	Peak position
Australia (ARIA)	68
New Zealand (Recorded Music NZ)	40
US Bubbling Under Hot 100 (Billboard)	12
US Adult Pop Airplay (Billboard)	33
US Pop Airplay (Billboard)	39

== Release history ==
Region	Date	Format(s)	Label(s)	Ref.
United States	September 24, 2001	Hot adult contemporary radio	Atlantic; Lava	
United States	September 25, 2001	Contemporary hit radio	Atlantic; Lava	
Australia	December 10, 2001	CD	Atlantic; Lava	
