= Floored =

Studio album by Sugar Ray
- Released: June 24, 1997
- Recorded: 1997
- Studio: NRG Recording Studios (North Hollywood, California)
- Genres: Funk metal; nu metal; alternative metal
- Length: 43:05
- Labels: Atlantic; Lava
- Producer: David Kahne

Sugar Ray chronology
Lemonade and Brownies (1995)	Floored (1997)	14:59 (1999)

Singles from Floored
- 1. "Fly" Released: May 16, 1997; 2. "RPM" Released: November 3, 1997

Floored is the second studio album by American rock band Sugar Ray, released on June 24, 1997. It includes the hit song "Fly", and a less successful follow-up successful single, "RPM". Two versions of "Fly" appear on the album, one of them featuring reggae artist Super Cat. Floored is the first album to feature DJ Homicide as an official member, and he remained with the band through to 2009's Music for Cougars.

== Production ==
=== Background and early writing sessions ===
Prior to releasing their reggae-influenced pop rock single "Fly", the band feared Atlantic Records would drop them due to the underperformance of their 1995 debut Lemonade and Brownies. Drummer Stan Frazier recalled in 1999 that it was "really depressing", noting that the band came close to being dropped from the label. In 1994, Sugar Ray had signed a two-album deal with Atlantic which was worth two million dollars, but the label were considering buying out their contract due to the commercial failure of Lemonade and Brownies. The album had seen some minor success in Europe, but fared very poorly in the United States, where it failed to chart. The band ended up doing seven tours in Europe to support Lemonade and Brownies, but did only a single one in the United States, where they were playing in front of mostly empty clubs. When Atlantic were on the verge of dropping Sugar Ray, a member of their metal department helped Sugar Ray get an appearance on The Howard Stern Show in New York City. They showed up to the studio with a group of women they knew from New York, staying on the program for an hour and a half. During their appearance, Stern's co-host Robin Quivers commented on how handsome singer Mark McGrath was, and the band performed a cover of a song called "Psychedelic Bee", which Stern himself had written while in his teenage band Electric Comic Book. The appearance increased their exposure, and Atlantic wanted to build off this momentum. Following the appearance on The Howard Stern Show, they ended up being given a second chance to go to New York for a month, where they would write new material.

DJ Homicide, formerly of hip hop group Tha Alkaholiks, was fully involved with the writing process of Floored, unlike on Lemonade and Brownies, where he only served as a guest musician for a few songs. DJ Homicide was recommended to them by DJ Lethal from hip hop group House of Pain, who had served as a co-producer on Lemonade and Brownies, since Sugar Ray were fans of House of Pain. Sugar Ray began as a punk band in the mid-1980s, but they later changed to glam metal, and on Lemonade and Brownies were experimenting with both punk and metal, as well as Red Hot Chili Peppers-style funk and much lighter genres like R&B and country. Early in the writing process of Floored, McGrath pushed for the band to make more heavy scream-oriented songs, but the other members preferred melody-driven music. Disagreements over the album's intended sound led to McGrath storming out of a practice session in New York. While McGrath was away, his bandmates started writing what would become "Fly". Frazier reflected, "we were looking for an identity, and we just didn't have it yet. So we're locked in this recording studio, writing all this heavy music, and that’s when the shit hit the fan, because Mark, didn’t like the songs we were writing and just decided, 'I'm out of here'. So he disappeared into the New York night for weeks." Once McGrath was gone, DJ Homicide decided to put on one of his drum loops and bassist Murphy Karges started noodling on his bass. Guitarist Rodney Sheppard then came up with some "island licks". Frazier liked what he was hearing from the other three members and stepped towards the microphone. Frazier thought up the chorus "I just want to fly" since he was frustrated by the situation the band had found themselves in, and wanted to "jump out the window and fly out of New York and go somewhere else." McGrath remembered in 2015 that they had been touring with heavy bands such as Deftones, downset. and Monster Magnet, and said that "Fly" was a song that "kind of came out of nowhere." McGrath added, "setting up [Floored] we said 'listen, we have a bit of a foothold in the metal world, let’s concentrate on that, make some heavier stuff', but at the same time we were getting better as songwriters." In 1999, McGrath also noted that when compared to Lemonade and Brownies, there was more pressure on them from the label to be a heavy band. He said, "[on Lemonade and Brownies] we were always open to all sides and experimented an awful lot. That way we had a lot of mellow songs and a lot of noisy, loud songs. But when we wrote and recorded Floored it was difficult. They wanted us to go into a certain direction, so they could promote us easier."

When McGrath first heard Frazier sing parts of "Fly" to him in New York, he strongly disliked it, and almost quit the band over it. He said all he heard was "I just want to fly", and it sounded "ethereal". McGrath described it as "the worst thing I had ever heard". McGrath later worked on the song himself, and started liking it more. Joseph McGinty "McG" Nichol, a friend of the band who produced Lemonade and Brownies, also heard this initial version of "Fly", and was the one who convinced McGrath to go back and give it another listen. McGrath said he eventually realized the song was a sign that his bandmates were becoming better songwriters. For the verses of "Fly", McGrath wrote lyrics which referred to a deceased mother, even though his mother was still alive. These lyrics contrasted the upbeat music and chorus the other band members wrote, with McGrath saying "there is this stark imagery in there. There's loss in it. There is loss of a mother, obviously. I thought it was a good way to juxtapose the lyrics with the melody on that." In a July 1997 interview with MTV, McGrath said that the band immediately knew "Fly" would be a single as soon as they recorded it. Shortly after the song was released, he incorrectly claimed that the lyrics were inspired from an A&R department meeting, where he saw a fly land on the left nostril of Atlantic Records senior VP Jason Flom.

=== Recording ===
McGrath was a fan of Southern Californian ska punk band Sublime, and Floored would end up being produced by David Kahne, who had previously worked with Sublime. McGrath claims he had only been a casual fan of them, until they released their 1996 self-titled breakthrough. Regarding Kahne and Sublime, McGrath said in October 1997, "I love that band. We got David Kahne to produce our album because of his work on the Sublime album. I don't think if you heard our record you'd think every song is like Sublime's, but I agree there are elements in there. 'Fly' [definitely] took on more reggae overtones as a result of working with Kahne. He produces in a certain way, and he is responsible for the Sublime sound." Pre-production work on the album was finished by early 1997, and Kahne booked them to record Floored at NRG Studios in the San Fernando Valley and Sunset Studio in Los Angeles. The studios were booked for six weeks, which was longer than the time they were given to record Lemonade and Brownies. When recording started with Kahne in 1997, McGrath said that they still only had pieces of songs written, but claims that they "felt good" about the still-yet unrecorded "Fly".

Prior to making the album, Sugar Ray requested to be moved to Lava Records, which is a sublabel of Atlantic that Jason Flom founded in 1995. In an October 1997 interview with Hits magazine, Flom said he had been a fan of the band for years, and was excited when they requested to be moved from Atlantic to Lava, since it meant he would be working with them. Flom had previously helped break Lava's Matchbox Twenty into the mainstream, and added that even before Sugar Ray recorded "Fly" with Kahne, he knew they had the potential to become successful. He said, "we brought in David Kahne to produce, and I felt very strongly that if we had one song we could really hang our hats on, it would break the band. I knew if people got a chance to see them live, they would be hooked."

Two versions of "Fly" appear on the album, with the first featuring Jamaican musician Super Cat and the second excluding his parts. It was McGrath's idea to have another artist appear on the song. Super Cat was well known in the dancehall genre, and McGrath had come across his work. He wanted to have Super Cat on the song since he felt like he fit the sunny "island vibe" of the song. Kahne had previously produced for Super Cat, and was able to get him on the phone. Within five days, he was recording his parts for the song in Los Angeles. Super Cat toasted over "Fly", with toasting being a form of Jamaican rap that predated American hip hop. Super Cat's lines were all improvised as he was recording them, and he went on to appear in the song's music video. Both versions of "Fly" were being sent out to radio stations in 1997, and where they were sent to depended on the type of music those stations specialized in. The first demo of "Fly" that Sugar Ray shared with Atlantic was made before Super Cat became involved, and as such was the version Atlantic was used to hearing. In a June 1997 interview, Rodney Sheppard said it was Atlantic who insisted on hearing an early demo of the song, noting that even before Sugar Ray sent out the demo, the band already "knew that we wanted to have a dance hall guy doing Jamaican toasting throughout the single." Since Atlantic had become used to hearing the version without Super Cat, they felt as though his presence might turn off some people, which is why they insisted on having two versions of the song on Floored. Sheppard further said in the interview, "being on a major label, it's a business and there is a series of compromises you have to make. Atlantic would like to see this thing eventually go to pop radio. They didn't want to turn anybody off who maybe didn't like the reggae thing and so they included that [other] version."

When McGrath was recording his vocals for "Fly", he worked closely with Kahne to get them to a standard which was good enough for the song. He said that Kahne "showed me where my voice wanted to be" on "Fly". Kahne tried to push the band during the recording, and often demanded multiple takes, which sometimes led to them leaving recording sessions with resentment towards him. For "Fly", he had McGrath do multiple takes on the line "my mother god rest her soul". Kahne told them that the reasoning for this was since he could "sell two million albums on that note alone". The band were skeptical the song could be as successful as he claimed, but he reassured them that the song was a hit in the making. Sheppard remembered they were "working all day, every day" during the six weeks they spent recording Floored. Regarding Kahne, Sheppard said "he's like a robot. He didn't even go to the bathroom. He just sits and works sixteen, seventeen hours a day, every day until it was finished. You couldn't ask a guy to be more dedicated to a project."

Murphy Karges labelled the song "High Anxiety" as a "lab experiment" in 2019. He recalls that it originated from McGrath and Kahne, saying that Kahne "kind of took it under his wing to create this interesting weird song that had all these parts in it." "Breathe" and "Invisible" were two of the more metal-influenced songs on the album, and both were rarely played live, with Karges saying that he considers "Invisible" to be an album filler. He commented, "sometimes you run out of ideas and you need another track to fill out the time, so then you just dump a bunch of random ideas, riffs and changes into a pot, stir it up, then pour it out onto the record. Thus is how 'Invisible' came to be." According to Karges, he and his bandmates later made fun of "Breathe" for being a bad song. He said, "this would be the song we'd throw under the bus. We'd talk about a hit or something, and then we'd go 'and there's always Breathe'." "Breathe" featured subtle keyboard parts from Kahne and was one of the songs where DJ Homicide was most prominent. Kahne wanted Floored to have a more layered sound than Lemonade and Brownies, making full use of studio tools and different instruments. The heavier songs on Lemonade and Brownies were written in more of a straightforward manner, since the band wanted them to be easily recreated live. Lemonade and Brownies also included several light R&B-influenced songs such as "Danzig Needs a Hug", "Hold Your Eyes" and "Scuzzboots", as well as a hidden country song called "One Brave Cowboy". All of the R&B songs were done as full-length tracks, rather than short interludes, and they featured melodic, sometimes falsetto-like vocals from McGrath, with McGrath comparing the songs to Boyz II Men in 1997. They were rarely performed alongside the band's punk/metal material on tour for Lemonade and Brownies, and Karges said in 2019 that they included those songs since they thought it would be funny to do so.

The song "American Pig" was another of the more metal-influenced tracks on Floored, but was played live far more frequently than "Breathe" and "Invisible" were. Karges remembered that they enjoyed playing it in Europe, because "we were sort of American Pigs ourselves". Frazier said the lyrics were inspired by the first of their seven tours in Europe for Lemonade and Brownies. For breakfast, the band would eat American-style meals like hash browns, which differed from the breakfasts the natives were eating. He said, "we'd wake up in the morning and go: 'let's have breakfast', and you have all these Europeans having a continental breakfast. And we just realized, we are these big 'American Pigs'." "RPM", the second single from Floored, has noises DJ Homicide created which were intended to sound like a second guitar in the song. In their 1997 review of the single, Album Network magazine described DJ Homicide's role in "RPM" as being that of a sound manipulator, rather than a typical DJ. The main guitar riff was inspired from Dave Sabo, of glam metal band Skid Row. Skid Row were labelmates of Sugar Ray, and Sabo heard the early version of "RPM" that Sugar Ray were working on, with Sabo suggesting they make a "sexy riff" for the song.

Karges claims that despite playing bass, he was coming up with many of the guitar parts for this album. However, he also noted that the main riff to "Cash" originated through McGrath. The song was regularly performed live by the band, and has a fast-paced hardcore punk sound, running at only a minute and a half. "Tap, Twist, Snap" and "Speed Home California" were among some of the other songs on Floored that had a fast punk-influenced sound. Karges described the main riff of "Tap, Twist, Snap" as being "very, raw [and] punk rock-ish". He considered the song to be reminiscent of the band's early days in the 1980s and early 1990s, before getting signed to Atlantic, when they were known as Shrinky Dinx and focused on playing hardcore punk music. The title to "Speed Home California" is a play on "Sweet Home Alabama" by Lynyrd Skynyrd, and McGrath came up with the lyrics, which were about how the band started to miss California while being away on tour for Lemonade and Brownies. The lyrics were inspired by one night where the band felt isolated while on tour in Germany, since they couldn't speak the language and had to deal with the cold, snowy weather, which contrasted the sunnier weather of Southern California.

Karges remembered that the track "Anyone" originated during the early writing sessions in New York, which also yielded "Fly". He said when they were writing it, they didn't use drop tuned guitars, since he didn't want Sugar Ray's music to sound like bands such as Korn and the Deftones. He felt as though there was no point in Sugar Ray trying to go in that direction, since they couldn't pull that style of music off as well as those bands did. Earlier in the New York sessions, they had come up with riffs for "Breathe" which were with drop tuned guitars. Karges said "it's an easy way to get a heavy sound. But I remember thinking at the time that it's not going to work like that. We're not going to last being a band that can go out and challenge the Korns and the Deftones. There's no way we can go out and compete with those." Instead, "Anyone" was written in standard tuning, and Karges said what he wrote for the song in New York was inspired by Nirvana. During the subsequent recording for "Anyone", McGrath used a style of singing that was more melodic than what he had previously done on the band's punk/metal material. On Lemonade and Brownies, he was mainly using melodic vocals just for the non-rock songs. At an August 28, 1997 concert in San Francisco, McGrath jokingly said that the song was about how anyone could do what he was doing, since he didn't view himself as being a skilled singer. In her 2000 Sugar Ray biography book, author Anna Louise Golden described "Anyone" as being a song that showcased the band's musical progression from Lemonade and Brownies, since it was a melodic track that was still heavy. According to her, "Invisible" was a heavy song "that wouldn't totally alienate those who bought 'Fly'", due to being another that had a strong sense of melody. She also described "RPM" as having a "huge riff" in the chorus, but said the rest of the song "wasn't going to take your head off — even someone not into metal could listen to it with pleasure. And that was the aim, [to] make the record more listener-friendly.""

The album features a cover of the 1981 new wave song "Stand and Deliver", by Adam and the Ants. It was decided that the band would do this cover during the pre-production period, before they started the recording process with Kahne. McGrath said in July 1997 that, "we grew up in Southern California listening to KROQ and Adam and the Ants and all that new wave stuff. The label knew we wanted to do a cover and they gave us all this Parliament-Funkadelic stuff and '70s soul collections and we just thought the Ants were closer to our attitude. It's so weird and glam." It is one of the lighter songs on the album, although at the time Frazier claimed "we did quite a different version from the actual original. Kind of a space mix." In June 1997, Sheppard said that "Stand and Deliver" is "a great example of how we don't traditionally use DJs in our band. Craig [DJ Homicide] is like a second guitar player in that song." The main guitar riff to the penultimate track "Right Direction" originated during a live show Sugar Ray had played with House of Pain at the House of Blues. It was the last original track on the album, which closes with the second version of "Fly". Their next album 14:59 would open with the similarly titled "New Direction", which was written in the style of a death metal song. "New Direction" was created with the intention of scaring the new fans Sugar Ray had attracted on the strength of "Fly", and it parodied how they were expected to make more songs like "Fly" following the release of Floored.

=== Appearance in Fathers' Day ===
Around the time the record was being made, the band appeared in the Warner Bros. comedy film Fathers' Day, which starred Robin Williams, Billy Crystal, Julia Louis-Dreyfus and Nastassja Kinski. The film was primarily shot in California, also featuring pop punk band The Muffs and music from ska-punk band The Mighty Mighty Bosstones. Sugar Ray and The Muffs were both signed to labels which were part of Warner Music Group, which itself was then part of the same corporate conglomerate as Warner Bros. Pictures. Sugar Ray figured as a major plot point in the film, since the teenage son of one of the protagonists decides to run away to follow them on tour. Fathers' Day would end up being released within a month of Floored in 1997, and its release date coincided with when "Fly" was first added to radio stations. Sugar Ray weren't well known when the project was being filmed, and the makers were at one point considering that they portray a fictional underground band called "The Mutilated Puppies", rather than themselves. McGrath told Stereogum in 2023 that his band were grateful to be appearing in a major movie at that time in their careers. He added, "they weren’t looking for a big band. They were looking for a band that people kind of knew, but it was a legitimate band, but wasn't huge, because they didn’t want a huge band to take away from the movie." It underperformed at the box office, and whenever McGrath ran into Billy Crystal, he would joke to Crystal about wanting to do a Fathers' Day 2. Due to their later pop success, some critics would label Fathers' Day as being out of touch with youth culture for portraying Sugar Ray as an edgy, underground band, with the critics believing that the band had already become popular when the film was made. Sugar Ray went on to appear in the 2002 Scooby-Doo film, which was shot in Australia. This film was also produced by Warner Bros., and made after the band had become much more well-known.

== Musical style ==
Floored has been categorized as funk metal, nu metal and alternative metal. It features elements of heavy metal, funk, new wave, reggae, pop, hardcore, skate punk, ska and hip hop. The AV Club in 2017 labelled it as a "funk-punk-alt-metal-lite-FM-pop mishmash". In 1999, The Morning Call said both this album and Lemonade and Brownies have "disparate material", ranging from "breezy" pop to "crunchy, metallic, guitar-driven rave-ups ". Regarding their mixture of styles, McGrath said in October 1997, "one thing that makes Sugar Ray relevant is the fact that we have a chameleonlike quality to us in that there's nothing we can't do. Floored is a testament to that." In July 1997, he also said that the song "Fly" fit with their philosophy of mixing different genres. McGrath added that people hearing the song on the radio might interpret it as the band changing direction, but noted that "if they check out the record, they'll see it's all over the place". In this same interview, Rodney Sheppard claimed that their diversity of styles was in part due to the fact that all members contributed to the writing process, but he noted that Floored had a "more focused" mix of styles than Lemonade and Brownies did. Stan Frazier said in a September 1997 Billboard interview that "we're a rock band with our primary influences in punk rock and heavy metal. But we recorded R&B [songs] on the last album." Frazier believed "Fly" was similar to the R&B songs they had done on Lemonade and Brownies, since it was also being placed alongside much heavier songs. The band referred to the R&B songs as "vibe tracks" when they were recording Lemonade and Brownies, and Frazier added that with "Fly", the band had "looked at it as just another vibe track" when they first started writing it. Frazier also noted in this interview that Sugar Ray were being labelled as imitators of Sublime, because of "Fly" and the fact they got David Kahne to produce their album. He said that while the bands did share musical similarities, the comparison between the two mainly came from "growing up in beach communities".

In their June 1997 review, the Los Angeles Times believed the album derived influence from Korn, Rage Against the Machine and the Vandals. In another article from 1999, the Los Angeles Times characterized this era of Sugar Ray as having a "harder edged punk-funk sound", and claimed it to be derivative of not only Rage Against the Machine but also the Red Hot Chili Peppers. In a July 1997 article about their role in Fathers' Day, British publication Kerrang! referred to Sugar Ray as "super-sexy US rap-rocking rascals". Ron Hart of CMJ New Music Report considered their sound on this album to be "metallic funk" in December 1998, while Spin referred to them as a punk-funk band in November 1997. Geoffrey Hines of The Washington Post similarly noted the album's mixture of funk, punk and metal. In July 1997, he wrote that "Sugar Ray are young enough to have learned a few lessons from such fellow Southern California bands as the pop-punkers Green Day, the funk-rockers Fishbone and the ska-punkers Sublime", adding that the band "borrows ingredients from all three role models and then thickens the sound by playing everything with the cartoonish hyperbole and heavy-metal pummeling of Kiss." Billboard claimed in September 1997 that the song "Fly" was not representative of the rest of the album, saying "while the band has undoubtedly become tied to the track due to its widespread coverage, it is only one facet of Sugar Ray's musical persona." In an August 1997 interview, Murphy Karges said he didn't want people to "flip out and think that there are 16 'Fly's' on this disk." Regarding the new type of fans the band was attracting with "Fly", Karges said "you just hope that there's something else on the record that they can dig." McGrath claimed in 2009 that he considered Floored to be heavier than Lemonade and Brownies, saying that "I think the common misconception with that first record is that it was really hard. Half the songs were some of the mellowest stuff we ever wrote — R&B songs with falsetto vocals." He added that, "it was funny; people would buy the [next] record Floored expecting fifteen 'Fly' and they got the hardest record we ever made."

Due to the massive amounts of strong language in the songs "Cash" and "American Pig", some copies of the album contain the "Parental Advisory" label. It contains the early label that can be peeled off the case. On the clean version of the album, all swear words are blanked out. It is their last album to feature explicit language and their last heavy album before they moved toward a more pop friendly approach.

== Touring and promotion ==
The band toured throughout 1997 and 1998 to support Floored. Sugar Ray performed at the Blockbuster Rockfest festival in Fort Worth, Texas on June 21, 1997, which was televised. The event featured artists such as Bush, Counting Crows, Jewel, No Doubt and Third Eye Blind, and was the first time Sugar Ray ever performed "Fly" live. It was a mostly free event, and is considered to be the tenth largest concert in history, with estimates being that it had 250,000 to 500,000 people in attendance. In an interview from June 25, 1997, Rodney Sheppard claimed that during Sugar Ray's part of the concert, there were 110,000 people in attendance. On Sugar Ray's previous tour for Lemonade and Brownies, the largest crowd they'd had was 15,000 people at a European festival. In the June 25, 1997 interview, Sheppard said even though the band had experimented with soft music on Lemonade and Brownies, they usually stuck to their heavier songs during live shows. This meant they were still figuring out how to transition from playing heavy songs to soft songs like "Fly" during their shows. He said, "'Fly' is the unique song in the set, we've sort of always mixed around with different kinds of music and different sounds. But usually live shows we've always been straightforward hard rocking. So getting that dynamic in [playing] 'Fly', you know, after coming off volume ten guitars is something that we're working on."

Towards the end of June 1997, the music video for "Fly" also premiered. The video was directed by Joseph McGinty "McG" Nichol, and based on the version of the song with Super Cat. Over the next two months, it would be frequently played on MTV's alternative show 120 Minutes, with the video first appearing on the June 22, 1997 episode of the program. The video was also being played on MTV's Buzz Bin. In early to mid July, Sugar Ray performed at the 1997 edition of the punk-focused Warped Tour, playing alongside Limp Bizkit, who released their debut Three Dollar Bill, Y'all that same month. Sugar Ray knew Limp Bizkit through DJ Lethal, who became a member of that band after co-producing Lemonade and Brownies and leaving House of Pain. Three Dollar Bill, Y'all included a song called "Indigo Flow" which referenced Sugar Ray and several other musicians that were friends with Limp Bizkit, while Floored's liner notes mentioned Limp Bizkit, alongside other bands that Sugar Ray were friends with, such as the Bloodhound Gang and Dog Eat Dog.

As "Fly" continued to gain popularity, they were chosen as the musical guests for the July 24, 1997 episode of Late Night with Conan O'Brien, where they performed the song. Following this, Sugar Ray invited Smash Mouth to join them on a run of shows in the United States, which lasted from late July 1997 to August 1997. Like Limp Bizkit, Smash Mouth had also just released their debut album in July 1997, which was titled Fush Yu Mang. Prior to doing the shows together, the media had been comparing Smash Mouth to Sugar Ray, since they were both lighthearted ska-influenced bands from Southern California. Sugar Ray had never performed alongside Smash Mouth prior to these shows, and would go on to tour with them frequently in the following years. Sugar Ray's American crowds began to increase around this period, with their previous U.S. tour for Lemonade and Brownies having been done in very small clubs as a result of its poor sales. In a July 31, 1997 review of a Smash Mouth and Sugar Ray concert, MTV compared the appearance of Mark McGrath to actor Ethan Hawke, and said that young women "packed the front row [and] were screaming and grabbing for a hold" of McGrath. On September 5, Sugar Ray made their second guest appearance on late night television in 1997, when they performed "Fly" on the Late Show with David Letterman. On September 7, 1997, Sugar Ray again performed alongside Limp Bizkit at the second edition of the KMYZ Edgefest in Tulsa. The lineup that year also included Artificial Joy Club, Helmet, Our Lady Peace, Reel Big Fish and Faith No More (who performed immediately after Sugar Ray). That same month, the music of Sugar Ray and Faith No More was featured together as part of an episode of Westwood One's Off The Record program, which focused on the two bands. A CD of this broadcast was also made.

Between October and December 1997, Sugar Ray toured America with 311 and Incubus, who at that point had not yet released their breakthrough single "Drive". Incubus were initially only meant to perform on the first leg of this tour, but the crowd response to them was so great that they stayed for the remainder of it. The music video for the second single "RPM" was again directed by McG, and premiered in November 1997, while the shows with 311 and Incubus were happening. The video garnered less coverage than the "Fly" video, only being played a single time on 120 Minutes, during the November 16, 1997 episode. After the 311 and Incubus tour, Sugar Ray continued to play shows into the early half of 1998, before focusing on the writing and recording of their follow-up album, 14:59. Other artists that Sugar Ray had shared bills with during the Floored touring cycle include The Aquabats, Blink-182, the Bloodhound Gang, Chumbawamba, Days of the New, Everclear, Goldfinger, Green Day, Hed PE, Kiss, L7, The Nixons, The Mighty Mighty Bosstones, Sarah McLachlan, Save Ferris, Snot, Summercamp and Weezer.

During the touring cycle, they covered the easy listening song "After the Lovin'" by Engelbert Humperdinck, and "We're Not Gonna Take It" by glam metal band Twisted Sister, with this being a song they would cover again in 2001. They also performed Canada's national anthem "O Canada" during a tour of Canada in early 1998, and occasionally included in their setlists "Hold Your Eyes", which was one of the light R&B-influenced songs from Lemonade and Brownies. At one 1997 show at Club 329 in Fullerton, California, the band took to the stage hours late since McGrath was in an altered state. When the audience grew angry towards Sugar Ray, McGrath responded by telling them that "all you guys out there are jealous of me 'cause your girlfriends would rather fuck me than you.'" McGrath eventually fell offstage, leaving bassist Murphy Karges and guitarist Rodney Sheppard to fill in on vocals. McGrath had a similar crowd incident during the tour for 1999's 14:59, where he was intoxicated and berated the crowd before dropping his pants and exposing himself. In a 2000 interview with the Tampa Bay Times, McGrath reflected on incidents like these, saying "sometimes I drink too much and do stupid things, and I try to run away from the pain of dealing with stuff. Sometimes that works for me, and sometimes it doesn't."

In addition to appearing as themselves in Fathers' Day, Sugar Ray's song "Speed Home California" was also featured in the film. In September 1997, they appeared on a tribute album for punk musician Iggy Pop titled We Will Fall: The Iggy Pop Tribute, where they contributed a cover of his 1988 song "Cold Metal". Sugar Ray had previously done covers of songs by the punk bands Black Flag and Circle Jerks, with these appearing on the Japanese edition of Lemonade and Brownies, along with a Ted Nugent cover. In late 1997, Sugar Ray and The Wilson Sisters recorded a cover of The Beach Boys' Christmas song "Little Saint Nick", with the cover being released as a single by Atlantic/Lava in 1997. On November 18, 1997, Sugar Ray contributed the song "Rivers" to the Scream 2 soundtrack album. The song can be heard in the credits of the film itself, which was released to theaters on December 12, 1997. It was an ode to Weezer frontman Rivers Cuomo and written in the style of a Weezer song. The song was not recorded during the Floored sessions, and instead originated during a recording session at Image Studios in Hollywood. Karges claimed in 2019 that he can't remember whether or not the band knew the song was going to be on the Scream 2 soundtrack when they were recording it. He said they were fans of Weezer and that the song was a way of "paying homage" to Cuomo. The recording session for "Rivers" yielded an additional unreleased song called "I Love My Television", which the band thought sounded like Van Halen's "Ain't Talkin' 'bout Love". Sugar Ray first played "Rivers" in July 1997, while Scream 2 was still being filmed. During one of the song's early performances, McGrath incorrectly claimed to the audience that Cuomo had died before they played the song. In 2009, Cuomo would allow Sugar Ray to record an unreleased Weezer song called "Love Is the Answer", with this song appearing on Sugar Ray's album Music for Cougars. In 2000, the version of "Fly" without Super Cat was used in the film Coyote Ugly. The song was later featured in a 2008 episode of animated comedy American Dad!, titled "Spring Break-Up".

== Commercial response ==
Floored went to number 12 on the Billboard 200 on August 30, 1997. Within a month of the album's release, "Fly" had become extremely popular. It went on to top the Radio Songs chart (and spending 59 weeks on the chart), the Pop Songs chart, and the Alternative Songs chart. In August 1997, Floored was certified gold in the United States, and in September of that year, 510,000 copies had been sold. By December 1997, sales had increased to 1,200,000 copies. In February 1998, Floored was certified 2× platinum by the Recording Industry Association of America for selling 2,000,000 copies in the United States. The sales for Floored were much higher than the sales for Lemonade and Brownies were. By September 1997, two-and-a-half years after it was released, Lemonade and Brownies had sold a mere 48,000 copies. In spite of the band's newfound success with Floored and later albums, the sales for Lemonade and Brownies only rose by roughly 20,000 units over the next 20 years.

"RPM", the second single from Floored, had a heavier sound similar to much of the album, and was far less successful than "Fly". McGrath later recalled that several years prior to making Floored, Rodney Sheppard's girlfriend had gone to see a psychic, and she predicted that the band would "become an overnight sensation with one song and they will fade as quickly as they rise up." McGrath said in 1999 that, "I always remembered that. It sure made us nervous after having only one hit from Floored."

The commercial success of Floored gave the band members enough money to start living separately from each other. When Sugar Ray were making Lemonade and Brownies and Floored, they had all shared a house together in the Los Angeles suburb of Hancock Park.

== Reception ==
Professional ratings
Review scores
Source	Rating
AllMusic	4/5 stars
Kerrang!	4/5 stars
Los Angeles Times	2/4 stars
New Straits Times	4/5
Rock Hard	6.5/10
The Rolling Stone Album Guide	2.5/5 stars
The Village Voice	B−

Floored received generally positive reviews. Robert Christgau gave the album a B− in December 1997, writing, "[Sugar Ray is] the nearest thing to a fresh young rock band the market or the 'underground' has kicked up this year." The June 28, 1997 review from The Los Angeles Times states that "Sugar Ray has a knack for catchy borrowing and for hard-rock crunch colored by pop hooks and a deejay's deft scratch effects. The single 'Fly' is a perfect summer confection that's as irresistible as it is lightweight." Mediaweek wrote on June 30, 1997, that "the album swings from mood to mood with ease from the heaviness of 'RPM' to the eclectic cover of Adam & the Ants' classic 'Stand & Deliver' to the free-flowing 'Fly'." Tulsa World's September 1997 review states, "credit Beck for one thing: he made the mixing of genres cool. Sugar Ray is one of those bunches of hardcore kids who love to mix it up, so long as it can be done fast and hard." They add, "from the reggae of the hit single 'Fly' to the jack-booted stomp of 'American Pig' or the pointless ranting of 'Cash', Sugar Ray covers the waterfront."

AllMusic awarded it a four out of five star rating, saying that "Sugar Ray's second album, Floored, is a noticeable improvement from Lemonade and Brownies. The group's fusion of metal, funk, reggae, and rap is seamless and confident, partially because Sugar Ray now emphasize the groove, not the guitars. The group still has difficulty writing a consistent batch of songs, but its hooks are stronger than ever." The Washington Post state in their July 1997 review that the band "are juvenile, politically incorrect and derivative but nonetheless boast an infectious energy and enthusiasm." In November 1997, R.S. Murthi of Malaysian paper the New Straits Times gave Floored a positive review, describing Sugar Ray as a "multiracial" band and as incorporating outside influences to hard rock. He also considered them to have a "wickedly perceptive sense of humor", adding, "even when the music seems market-dictated, like on 'Fly', it's invested with a fun spirit that at the least has a mild appeal." In the October 18, 1997 issue of British publication Kerrang!, they compared "Fly" to Sublime, and said "so it's finally happening for Sugar Ray. With a fanny magnet like Mark McGrath upfront, it was only a matter of time until MTV picked up these hard rockin 'n' rappin dudes from Orange County, California."

A mixed review at the time came from the Tampa Bay Times, who called Floored a "bland alt-metal record" in July 1997. In a September 1997 review of a Sugar Ray concert, Variety wrote that "the quintet's low-brow approach — a mix of metal, hip-hop, rock and reggae, all peppered by spastic singer Mark McGrath's puerile lyrics — aims only to be fun, guilt-free entertainment."

=== Legacy ===
Entertainment Weekly's Rebecca Ascher-Walsh wrote in 1999 that the album made Sugar Ray "the 1997 Furbys of the MTV spring-break crowd." That same year, CNN described the song "Fly" as turning Mark McGrath into a "sex symbol". In 2013, Angelica Leichardt of OC Weekly criticized their change in direction following Floored, remarking "perhaps they should have stayed a funk-metal band, which is where their sound originated from, because anything would be better than the junk they put out [afterwards]." Music critic Stephen Thomas Erlewine had a more positive view of the band's later change in direction, saying in 2003 that "they not only abandoned funk-metal the second they had a hit with the breezy 'Fly', they ran with their newfound success, turning into the sunny, good-time summertime band that American pop radio desperately needed in the bleak, self-absorbed aftermath of grunge." In 2005, the Philippine Daily Inquirer reflected that "Fly" was "fun, reggae-tinged pop" and added that it "contrasted with the metal feel of the rest of the album." The A.V. Club wrote negatively of the album on its 20th anniversary in 2017. They noted that it was released in the same two week stretch between late June and early July 1997 that also featured albums by artists such as Insane Clown Posse, Limp Bizkit and Smash Mouth, and argued that this was the worst two week stretch in music history. In 2015, Kate Beaudoin of Mic.com wrote that 1997 was "the definitive year [for] '90s guilty pleasures", and cited "Fly" as an example in her article, alongside songs such as "Barbie Girl" by Aqua, "MMMBop" by Hanson and "Bitch" by Meredith Brooks.

== Track listing ==
All tracks are written by Sugar Ray (Mark McGrath, Rodney Sheppard, Murphy Karges, Stan Frazier and Craig Bullock), except where noted.

No.	Title	Writer(s)	Length
1.	"RPM"	Sugar Ray; David Kahne; David Sabo	3:21
2.	"Breathe"		3:24
3.	"Anyone"		3:29
4.	"Fly" (featuring Super Cat)	Sugar Ray; William Maragh; Alan Shacklock	4:52
5.	"Speed Home California"		2:42
6.	"High Anxiety"	Sugar Ray; Kahne	3:31
7.	"Tap, Twist, Snap"		3:12
8.	"American Pig"		4:01
9.	"Stand and Deliver" (Adam and the Ants cover)	Adam Ant; Marco Pirroni	2:58
10.	"Cash"		1:35
11.	"Invisible"	Sugar Ray; Kahne	3:09
12.	"Right Direction"	Sugar Ray; Kahne	2:53
13.	"Fly"	Sugar Ray; Shacklock	4:04
Total length:			43:05

== Personnel ==
Sugar Ray

- Mark McGrath – lead vocals, rhythm guitar
- Rodney Sheppard – lead guitar, backing vocals
- Murphy Karges – bass, backing vocals
- Stan Frazier – drums, percussion, guitar, programming, backing vocals
- Craig "DJ Homicide" Bullock – turntables, samples, programming, keyboards, backing vocals

Artwork

- Alison Dyer – photography
- Donald May & Larry Freemantle – art direction
- Rob Eberhardt – album artwork for chrome renderings
- Richard Newton – illustration

Additional musicians

- David Kahne – additional programming, keyboards

Production

- David Kahne – producer, engineer, mixing
- Stephen Marcussen – mastering
- Doug Trantow – mixing assistant
- James Murray – mixing assistant
- Mark Nixdorf – mixing assistant
- Mike Rew – mixing assistant
- John Ewing Jr. – assistant Engineer
- John Travis – tracking engineer
- Chip Quigley & Lee Heiman – management

== Charts ==
=== Weekly charts ===
Chart (1997)	Peak position
New Zealand Albums (RMNZ)	32
Swedish Albums (Sverigetopplistan)	52
US Billboard 200	12

=== Year-end charts ===
Chart (1997)	Position
Canadian Albums Chart (Nielsen Soundscan)	67
US Billboard 200	61
Chart (1998)	Position
US Billboard 200	116

== Certifications ==
Region	Certification	Certified units/sales
Canada (Music Canada)	Platinum	100,000^{^}
United States (RIAA)	2× Platinum	2,000,000^{^}
^{^} Shipments figures based on certification alone.
