= Lemonade and Brownies =

Studio album by Sugar Ray
- Released: April 4, 1995
- Recorded: 1994–1995
- Studio: Image Recording Studios (Hollywood, California)
- Genres: Funk metal; nu metal; rap metal
- Length: 43:07
- Label: Atlantic
- Producer: Joseph McGinty Nichol

Sugar Ray chronology
Lemonade and Brownies (1995)	Floored (1997)

Singles from Lemonade and Brownies
- 1. "Mean Machine" Released: March 30, 1995; 2. "10 Seconds Down" Released: October 7, 1995; 3. "Iron Mic" Released: February 29, 1996

Lemonade and Brownies is the debut studio album by the American rock band Sugar Ray, released on April 4, 1995, by Atlantic Records. It was far less successful than the band's later releases on Atlantic. The debut album and the band's next album Floored also featured less of a pop-influenced sound than their later work.

== Background ==
When the band got signed to Atlantic Records they had only four to five songs, including "Caboose" and "Big Black Woman" (which were featured on Lemonade and Brownies) and two other songs called "Lick Me" and "Gold Digger". Prior to getting signed, they had primarily been a cover band, and were known as Shrinky Dinx. In 1993, Shrinky Dinx created their own video for "Caboose", with their director friend Joseph McGinty "McG" Nichol, who went on to become a director for Hollywood films such as Charlie's Angels. At this point, McG served as their de facto manager and he helped them sign with the new management company of Lee Heiman and Chip Quigley, who in turn helped negotiate the subsequent deal with Atlantic. Shrinky Dinx had signed a five-year exclusive artist management deal with Heiman and Quigley, and one of the clauses that they put in the contract was that they would get them a record contract within six months. Shortly after signing with Heiman and Quigley, the "Caboose" video found its way to Atlantic Records executive Doug Morris. Drummer Stan Frazier later recalled that "Doug Morris [from Atlantic] saw the live energy in the video and said, 'Sign that band, this is entertaining.'" They agreed to a two million dollar deal with Atlantic, with the deal being signed at a local pizza shop in Newport Beach. California. One of the reasons Morris wanted to sign Shrinky Dinx was since he saw star potential in singer Mark McGrath, who he referred to as "the kid" during a meeting with Heiman and Quigley. Morris was so impressed by the video that he signed the band without having even heard a demo tape of theirs. McGrath believes another reason they got signed was since major labels were more willing to take chances on bands at that time, following the success of Nirvana.

Once getting signed, they changed their name to Sugar Ray (after the boxer Sugar Ray Leonard), due to threats of legal action from the Milton Bradley Company, maker of the Shrinky Dinks toy. The band chose this name since they were fans of boxing and other sports. Heiman said that he had initially opposed the name Sugar Ray, since he was "afraid that everyone would just know the name from the boxer and it wouldn't work." Work on Lemonade and Brownies would begin in mid-1994, with McG serving as producer. DJ Lethal from rap group House of Pain served as a co-executive producer. Sugar Ray asked DJ Lethal to work on their album as they were a fan of the House of Pain song "Jump Around". DJ Homicide appears on a few of the album's tracks, and was credited as a guest musician, being excluded from a group shot of the band on the back of the album, which shows them riding a rollercoaster. He later became an official touring member of Sugar Ray. Prior to becoming involved with Sugar Ray, DJ Homicide had been working as a hip hop radio DJ in Los Angeles, and was briefly a member of rap group Tha Alkaholiks. In a July 1997 interview promoting their next album Floored, McGrath reflected that "Homicide came in toward the end of the last album and he's a clown like us. We grew up listening to Kiss and AC/DC and he's from a totally different background, so it's a great exchange." Guitarist Rodney Sheppard said in a June 1997 interview, "DJ Homicide, he's not really a killer. He's a nice guy. I call him Craig. We live together and it's unfit at the dinner table to go, 'Hey Homicide, pass the rolls'."

The album title originated after recording was finished, and was inspired by an ad in a pornographic magazine, which featured a near-naked woman and the slogan "try our lemonade and brownies". The band found the magazine after moving into a house in the Los Angeles suburb of Hancock Park, which they shared during the making of this album and Floored. There were numerous other pornographic magazines in the house, since the old tenant was a collector of them. The band liked "lemonade and brownies" as an album title since it differs from the more conventional term "milk and brownies", which they thought reflected how their music didn't conform to just a single genre. Some reviewers believed that the album's title was a reference to urine and feces. The title is reminiscent of Ween's Chocolate and Cheese, which was released in September 1994 while Lemonade and Brownies was being made, and whose title was similarly chosen to represent that band's contrasting musical styles. The artwork for the two albums also feature similar images of scantily clad women. In 2013, bassist Murphy Karges said that he was aware of Chocolate and Cheese when it came out in 1994, and was a fan of the artwork. Karges reflected, "we just figured that a potentially controversial cover might get more people to check us out."

Actress Nicole Eggert is featured on the cover of Lemonade and Brownies. On the photo, she is naked on a white fluffy rug, which resembles a cloud. She was then known for appearing on the television series Baywatch, and McGrath was dating her best friend. He said in October 1997 that the cover art helped the album gain more exposure, saying "I can't tell you how many program directors have told me they played our record because of that photo. They'd tell me that a typical CD that comes across their desk ends up in the trash, but our cover grabbed them and they put it on. And Nicole wouldn't even take a cent for it."

On the album's liner notes the band members are credited under pseudonyms rather than their real names. McGrath is credited as "Liar", Sheppard is credited as "Traitor", Frazier is credited as "Cheat" and Karges is credited as "Sellout".

== Music and influences ==
Sugar Ray initially began as a hardcore punk band in 1986, but had gone through several style changes by the time they got signed to Atlantic Records, including at one point being a glam metal band. The Rolling Stone Encyclopedia of Rock & Roll (2001) states that on their first two albums, Sugar Ray were influenced by "a variety of sounds: Red Hot Chili Peppers-style punk-funk, reggae grooves, metal, hip hop, and a little bit of retro new wave." The songs on Lemonade and Brownies have been described as having elements of heavy metal, hardcore punk, funk, speed metal, blues rock, R&B, hip hop, acid jazz, arena rock, country, disco and sketch comedy. In 1999, Corey Moss of the Iowa State Daily compared their sound on this album to Faith No More. AllMusic labelled Lemonade and Brownies as being "sub-Chili Peppers shuck-and-jive."

In her 2000 Sugar Ray biography book, author Anna Louise Golden states that people at the time considered the band's sound to be "putting the funk into music that was perilously close to metal", adding that "at that time, more than anything, people considered them to be heavily under the influence of the Red Hot Chili Peppers." She also said that "the music was hard, but it was fun. There was none of that gloom, doom and angst that permeated so much of the alternative scene." Golden categorized the song "Big Black Woman" as being a cross between blues rock and speed metal. This song was originally titled "Big Butt Woman", and McGrath told his bandmates that it was based on his humorous experience of getting hit on by a black transvestite woman. The version on Lemonade and Brownies is faster and heavier than the early Shrinky Dinx version of the song, which had more of a standard punk sound. The song "Danzig Needs a Hug" references the punk/metal singer Glenn Danzig, who is known for his dark image. It features falsetto vocals from McGrath and backing vocals from Janine Harris, a member of R&B group Slapbak, who were signed to a Warner Music Group label like Sugar Ray. Golden describes the song as being "close to disco lite". When the song came out, an interviewer asked Glenn Danzig about the song, and all he said back to the interviewer was "Sugar Ray can suck my dick", with Murphy Karges saying this was the response they expected from him.

In addition to "Danzig Needs a Hug". Lemonade and Brownies also included other similarly light R&B-influenced songs, such as "Hold Your Eyes" and "Scuzzboots", with McGrath comparing these lighter songs to Boyz II Men in 1997. "Danzig Needs a Hug", "Hold Your Eyes" and "Scuzzboots" were not done in the style of short interludes, instead running the same length of time as the rock songs. Karges said in 2019 that he and his bandmates would call these lighter non-rock songs "vibe tracks". He added that the reason why these songs are on the album was because they "just thought it was funny" to include them. The album ends with a hidden country-influenced acoustic track, titled "One Brave Cowboy". The hidden country track follows "Streaker", one of the heaviest songs of the band's discography, which itself follows "Scuzzboots", one of the light R&B songs. Sugar Ray would later explore country music again on their 2001 self-titled album, with the track "Just a Little", while in 2015 McGrath would also go on to join the bro-country supergroup Uncle Ezra Ray, which featured him, Uncle Kracker and Better than Ezra singer Kevin Griffin. "Streaker" samples a riff from the 1979 song "Richie Dagger's Crime" by punk rock band Germs, and lyrically references MC Hammer's 1994 music video for "Pumps and a Bump", which featured him only in underwear with a group of scantily clad women. The synthesizers used throughout "Scuzzboots" were sampled from the 1977 song "Let Me Love You", by R&B musician Michael Henderson. Karges said the sound of "Scuzzboots" was reminiscent of soul singer Isaac Hayes. He added that its title jokingly references the "scuzzy little rings" people have around their ankles when they use a broken shower with dirty water, even though the lyrics in the song itself appear to be about a man who has been cheated on by a woman.

Regarding their influences on the album, McGrath reflected in 2009, "we're such fans of all kinds of music. I love Slayer, I love The Beach Boys and everything in between. When you have five guys who write in the band — like we all do — you're going to get a lot of influences. Back then when we started we were like kids in a candy store. We were just throwing things against the wall." In a 2015 interview, McGrath said he considered their sound during this period to be a "pre nu-metal type rap/rock thing." He added, "yes, people look back on it as a 'metal record'. But if you listen to that record, there are R&B songs, soul, I'm singing falsetto on a song. If you hear the record you're hearing a band in its cocoon stage, going 'who are we?' [...] We were kind of a jokey metal/rock/punk/funk/thrash... we were the Chili Peppers with zero talent." McGrath has also said that the band were all fans of The Beastie Boys, who were known for jumping between genres on albums, with McGrath saying in 2009 that they were doing both "hardcore stuff" and "mellow stuff" on their albums.

"Caboose" has a glam metal/arena rock-influenced sound, since it was written before the band got signed, and it is the only rock song on the album with guitars that were in standard tuning. It includes samples of the 1970 song "I'll Say It Again" by R&B singer Linda Tillery and the 1990 song "Fuck tha Police" by hip hop group N.W.A. The track opens with a sound clip of a hockey announcer calling a close match. "Drive By" is a comedic skit which revolves around the band trying to order a taco from a drive-through. Despite having musical elements, Karges claimed in 2019 that he doesn't consider it to be a proper song, reflecting "we just thought it would be funny to do [...] we always just thought of like what we could do that's really stupid and funny". It has similarities to the Ween song "Pollo Asado", from their 1991 album The Pod, which is also a comedic musical skit about ordering a taco from a restaurant. The band were considering going to a real Del Taco drive-through to record the skit, although they decided against this since it would be too logistically difficult to do so. They ended up recreating the skit themselves, and used Karges's 1968 Dodge Charger to record the sounds of the vehicle in the track. To record the Dodge Charger, they had to stick a microphone to the muffler. The skit has a drumbeat playing throughout, which originated through Jason Roberts, a mixer on Lemonade and Brownies. The band had tried to incorporate this drumbeat in other songs, but had difficulty doing so, which is why they included it on "Drive By". The album opener "Snug Harbor" has been labelled as acid jazz. It uses a jazz loop that DJ Lethal had found, and the band came up with the lyric "hey, get up, have some fun tonight", which is repeated throughout the track. The name "Snug Harbor" is a reference to a bar that the band used to frequent at Newport Beach. The track was meant to resemble a game show intro, and was recorded at the backroom of Image Studios in Hollywood. The band liked this as an opener since it was "full of energy" and "stupid".

"Dance Party USA" includes backing vocals from producer McG. His vocals weren't originally intended to appear on the track, and they were of him trying to instruct McGrath on how to sing the song. The song includes the lyric "I'm like the real world, I start in New York I'm in L.A. then Frisco", which is a reference to the MTV reality series The Real World. It is primarily built around a "big, dumb riff" which the band liked, and was regularly played live on the tour for Lemonade and Brownies. However, it quickly fell out of their setlists once Floored was released. The idea for "Iron Mic" originated through McG during a rehearsal. He wanted them to use a bassline similar to "Walk on the Wildside" by Lou Reed, and the band started developing the rest of the song from there. Karges noted that the bassline to "Walk on the Wildside" is a very common chord progression that can be heard in numerous other songs, saying in 2019 "if you're writing it's okay to take a very, very common chord progression, I mean how many chords and notes are there, there aren't that many. It's how your band or artist approaches playing it and plays it." McGrath wrote the lyrics to "Iron Mic", and they revolved around boxer Mike Tyson.

The main guitar riff to the lead single "Mean Machine" was written by Karges, and it was directly inspired by the riff from "Who Was in My Room Last Night?", by the Butthole Surfers. In April 1995, the band described the song as lyrically being a tribute to McGrath's "barf green" vintage Cadillac car. McGrath said, "I'm psychotically in love with that car, so I had to incorporate it into the album somehow". In April 1995, McGrath claimed the other single "10 Seconds Down" lyrically revolved around his sexual inadequacy, with the song's "remote control" lyric referring to using a television remote control while in bed. He said, "I'm really bad in the sack. The problem is that I only last for about 10 seconds and I can only do it once. Seriously. Afterwards, I'll immediately need the remote control so I can switch on SportsCenter." "The Greatest" was one of the band's favorite songs to play live around this period, with Karges saying that it was the song that best showcased what each member brought to the band's sound. He also said that the song translated better in live performances than in the studio version, since the parts for the studio version were pieced together.

=== B-sides and bonus tracks ===
The Australian and Japanese editions of the album both included songs which were not on the American version. The Japanese edition features four bonus tracks, including a live performance of a song called "Dr J". The other tracks were covers of "White Minority" and "Wasted" by the hardcore punk bands Black Flag and Circle Jerks, and a cover of the 1980 song "Wango Tagno" by Ted Nugent. Karges had previously toured with Circle Jerks in 1990, when he was temporarily part of Los Angeles punk band The Weirdos. Karges came up with the music to "Dr J", with McGrath adding comedic lyrics to the song. This live version of "Dr J" is the only one available on any of the band's releases, since a studio recording was never made for it. Rob Hillis, a friend of the band, shouts "come on horseys, run" at the beginning of "Wasted", and the band can be heard laughing as he says this. The band brought Hillis to the studio the day they recorded this cover, and were drinking budweiser beers. They asked Hillis to "go say something", which is how this line originated. Hillis later suffered a double stroke in early 2000, and that year the band did a benefit concert to help him pay for his six-figure medical bills.

During the Lemonade and Brownies era, the band wrote a 1 minute song called "The Club", which is stylistically a fast hardcore punk song that incorporates electronic keyboard sounds. A live version of "The Club" was included on the CD single for "10 Seconds Down" in 1995. A studio version of "The Club" was also recorded for the 1998 Nintendo 64 game Road Rash 3D, appearing in both the game and its official soundtrack album.

== Promotion and commercial performance ==
The band shot a music video for "Mean Machine" with McG, which was based on the "Caboose" video that helped them get signed to Atlantic. They later shot another video with McG in Los Angeles for "10 Seconds Down". On the album, neither of those songs used DJ Homicide and turntables, but he still appeared in the video for "10 Seconds Down", where he was pretending to perform over the pre-recorded track, since he had become a member of the band by the time it was shot. The music video for "Mean Machine" was featured in a 1995 Beavis and Butt-Head episode titled "Bang the Drum Slowly Dumbass". They also performed "10 Seconds Down" on a 1995 episode of MTV's alternative program 120 Minutes. In 1996, "10 Seconds Down" was included on the soundtrack for Escape from L.A.. That same year, "Iron Mic" was included on the soundtrack for the Ruby-Spears-produced Mega-Man cartoon. It is rumored that Mark McGrath did voice-over work for one of the show's episodes. "Hold Your Eyes", one of the lightest songs on the album, was featured in the erotic thriller film Wild Things. The film was released in 1998, the year after Sugar Ray's commercial breakthrough with Floored. "Hold Your Eyes" plays in a scene where Suzie (Neve Campbell) is smoking while being visited by Duquette (Kevin Bacon).

Upon release, the album experienced some minor success in Europe, where similar bands like downset. and Rage Against the Machine were popular. It did not chart in the United States and was considered a commercial and critical failure for Atlantic Records. For Lemonade and Brownies, the band did seven tours in Europe, but in the United States they did only a single tour to mostly empty clubs. Since the band were playing so many shows in Europe, they used to joke to each other that "Europe loves the hard stuff". On February 2, 1996, they performed "Iron Mic" on British talk program The Girlie Show, a program which mainly featured pop artists as musical guests, such as the Spice Girls. Before they performed "Iron Mic" on the program, McGrath showed host Sara Cox how he was able to set parts of his pubic hair on fire. The previous year, they had performed "Streaker", "Mean Machine" and "Dance Party USA" on French television channel M6. Between 1995 and 1996, the band played roughly 200 shows in support of Lemonade and Brownies. During the tour, they covered Gary Numan's 1979 synth-pop song "Cars", and used the 1982 funk song "West Coast Poplock" by Ronnie Hudson during intermission breaks. During some of their songs, McGrath would occasionally mix in lyrics from new songs by other artists, such as "You Are Not Alone" by Michael Jackson and "Roots Bloody Roots" by Sepultura. They also performed a song called "I Love My Television" which was inspired by Van Halen's "Ain't Talkin' 'bout Love". In a recording session during the Floored era, they made a studio version of this song, along with a Weezer homage song called "Rivers" (which appeared on the Scream 2 soundtrack), but the studio version of "I Love My Television" was never released. In 2016, former manager Lee Heiman said the band became tighter musicians during the tour for Lemonade and Brownies, and were having a fun time playing at small clubs, adding that "everything was going according to plan, yet the album sales were not happening."

When Sugar Ray had initially signed their two million dollar deal with Atlantic, Heiman and his partner Chip Quigley put a clause in the contract that Atlantic had to release a second record, no matter how poorly the first may have done. Heiman described this clause as a "firm two-year commitment." However, the label were considering buying out their contract due to the underperformance of Lemonade and Brownies. Sugar Ray ended up staying on Atlantic for Floored, as part of their sublabel Lava (which was established in 1995). They subsequently experienced huge success in the summer of 1997, after the release of their reggae/pop-influenced single "Fly". In September 1997, three months after Floored was released, Lemonade and Brownies had only sold 48,000 copies according to SoundScan, which was then considered a very low number for a band on a major label. Their newfound success with Floored and later albums help slightly raise sales over time. McGrath said in 2015 that it had sold roughly 100,000 copies by that point. Heiman claimed in 2016 that it had sold 70,000 copies.

== Reception ==
Professional ratings
Review scores
Source	Rating
AllMusic	2/5 stars
Los Angeles Times	1.5/4 stars
The Rolling Stone Album Guide	2/5 stars

Lemonade and Brownies received a generally mixed response from critics upon its release. AllMusic's Stephen Thomas Erlewine wrote that the album is "a competent set of alternative funk/metal", but noted that "nothing on Lemonade & Brownies is particularly distinctive." In June 1995, Mike Boehm of the Los Angeles Times labelled it "juvenile", and cited it as having "the dumb-fun appeal that's the essence of frat rock." Boehm adds "with the album's cheesecake artwork and infantile, toilet-humor title, it's clear Sugar Ray is factoring its appeal down to lowest denominators with this debut CD." Kirk Miller of The Michigan Daily wrote in September 1995 that "Sugar Ray is the same feeling as having the munchies at 3 a.m. and running out to Denny's." He adds that the album is "a big ooey-gooey-chocolatey binge of phat punk-funk metal. Oh and the singer looks like Brad Pitt. Yum?".

In August 1995, CMJ New Music Monthly wrote that the album "jumps hyperactively between rap, hardcore, arena rock and funk with a lot more skill and strength than you might expect (although, like so many white boys, they sound like they're trying a bit too hard to be funk-ay)". The publication further stated that, "The Beastie Boys (there's even a "Cookie Puss"-style prank phone call), Bad Brains and Van Halen loom large here. Although its Beasties/Peppers personality sometimes overpowers the music, Sugar Ray manages to pull it off throughout most of this LP." In April 1995, David Beran of the Gavin Report similarly wrote, "dangling their feet in the streams of hard rock and funk, Sugar Ray manage to do what the Beasties and Chilis have done." In his August 1995 review, Scott Iwasaki of the Deseret News described Sugar Ray as a "hardcore hip-metal act resembling Beastie Boys and Red Hot Chili Peppers", and said that the album has "a couple of innovative surprises". He described the opening track "Snug Harbor" as being "a little acid jazz" and said that "'Hold Your Eyes' sounds so urban you'd think Dr. Dre played a hand in the mix." New Zealand publication Rip It Up wrote in their November 1995 review that the album has "excursions into [various] musical genres, combined with a sense of humor and quirkiness." They add that, "shuffled in their deck of harder songs are laidback funk songs 'Danzig Needs a Hug' and 'Hold Your Eyes', which could easily pass as the product of a cheesy combo fitted with polyester lounge suits."

=== Legacy ===
David Jenison of In Music We Trust claimed in 1999 that with Lemonade and Brownies, "Sugar Ray only had three things going for them: 1) a good looking singer, 2) punk rock influences, and 3) being from Orange County, home to bands like No Doubt and the Offspring. But Sugar Ray also had a big problem — they didn't have any real songs." In April 1999, shortly after the release of Sugar Ray's third album 14:59, the Daily Press reflected on Lemonade and Brownies, saying that it "included songs that more closely resembled the raunchy punk-funk of the Red Hot Chili Peppers than either of Sugar Ray's [current] hits." The Rolling Stone Album Guide (2004) gave the album two out of five stars, saying "early on, Sugar Ray had a bunch of musical ideas — funk-metal, ska-pop, like that. Unfortunately, better bands had had the same ideas years before."

In 2016 former Sugar Ray manager Lee Heiman said that he considered it to be their best album, in spite of its commercial failure. In 2021, Louder Sound had a positive view of the album compared to their later pop-oriented material, writing that "[Lemonade and Brownies] and its 1997 follow-up Floored are actually worth investing a little bit of your time to", adding that "we get why they 'sold out', but damn, we could have done with more of this before they went for the big pay day." In 2019, Rani Baker of Grunge.com included Sugar Ray on a list titled "Bands That Don't Sound Anything Like They Used To". She called Lemonade and Brownies a "messy funk-punk effort", and noted that, "to many folks, Sugar Ray was [just] another blonde-frosted late-'90s nothing of a band whose songs showed up in sitcoms and romcoms."

Due to its sensual nature, the cover has been included in several lists focusing on sexual album artwork. In 2012, Danielle Bacher of the LA Weekly placed it third on a list titled "The Top Ten Sexiest Album Covers We've Ever Seen", while Ultimate Classic Rock placed it 19th on their list of "Rock's 50 Sexiest (And Maybe NSFW) Album Covers". British tabloid the Daily Star also included it on their list of "The 21 Naughtiest Album Covers" in 2023.

== Track listing ==
All lyrics are written by Mark McGrath; all music is composed by Sugar Ray (McGrath, Rodney Sheppard, Murphy Karges, Stan Frazier) and Joseph McGinty Nichol, except where noted.

No.	Title	Music	Length
1.	"Snug Harbor"	Sugar Ray, Nichol, Leor Dimant	0:50
2.	"Rhyme Stealer"		2:51
3.	"Iron Mic"		4:40
4.	"Hold Your Eyes"	Sugar Ray, Nichol, Dimant	3:29
5.	"The Greatest"	Sugar Ray, Nichol, Brett Bouldin	3:58
6.	"Big Black Woman"		1:43
7.	"Mean Machine"	Sugar Ray, Nichol, Charlie Ryan, W. S. Stevenson	2:41
8.	"Dance Party USA"		3:18
9.	"10 Seconds Down"		3:39
10.	"Danzig Needs a Hug"	Sugar Ray, Nichol, Dimant	3:07
11.	"Drive By" (Comedy skit)	Sugar Ray, Nichol, Dimant	1:58
12.	"Caboose"		3:13
13.	"Scuzzboots"	Sugar Ray, Nichol, Dimant	3:29
14.	"Streaker"		4:12
15.	"One Brave Cowboy" (Hidden bonus track plays after 2 minutes of silence)		1:37
Total length:			43:07

Japanese bonus tracks
No.	Title	Lyrics	Music	Length
15.	"White Minority" (Black Flag cover)	Greg Ginn	Ginn	1:03
16.	"Wasted" (Black Flag cover)	Keith Morris, Ginn	Ginn, Morris	0:49
17.	"Wango Tango" (Ted Nugent cover)	Ted Nugent	Nugent	3:56
18.	"Dr. J" (Live)			3:11
Total length:				52:06

== Personnel ==
=== Sugar Ray ===
- Mark McGrath - lead vocals (credited as "Liar")
- Rodney Sheppard - guitars, backing vocals (credited as "Traitor")
- Murphy Karges - bass, backing vocals (credited as "Sellout")
- Stan Frazier - drums, backing vocals (credited as "Cheat")

=== Additional musicians ===
- DJ Lethal - turntables, samples
- DJ Homicide - additional scratches
- Janine Harris - additional vocals on "Danzig Needs a Hug"

=== Production ===
- McG - producer
- DJ Lethal - executive producer
- Jason Roberts - mixing
- Ben Wallach - engineer
- Tom Baker - mastering
- Barry "Lord" Conley, Steve Gallagher, Mon Agranat, Eric Fischer & John Ewing Jr. - additional engineers
- Dante Ariola & Jay Papke - art direction and design
- Stephen Stickler & Dante Ariola - cover photography
- Melanie Nissen - additional photography

== Charts ==
Chart (1996)	Peak position
Swedish Albums (Sverigetopplistan)	48
