= Mean Machine (song) =

Single by Sugar Ray

from the album Lemonade and Brownies
- Released: 1995
- Genre: Hard rock; heavy metal
- Length: 2:41
- Label: Atlantic
- Producer(s): McG

Sugar Ray singles chronology
"Mean Machine" (1995)	"10 Seconds Down" (1995)

Music video
- "Mean Machine" on YouTube

"Mean Machine" is a song by American rock band Sugar Ray. It was released as the lead single from the band's debut album, Lemonade and Brownies. The song peaked at No. 45 on the Radio & Records active rock chart.

Biographer Anna Louise Golden described the song as "ruthlessly fast metal" with electronic accents from DJ Lethal. The song's musical style blended British-style hard rock and heavy metal with American rockabilly elements. Golden said the song was "too heavy and fast" to be a bigger chart hit at the time.
