= DJ Homicide =

American musician and DJ (born 1970)

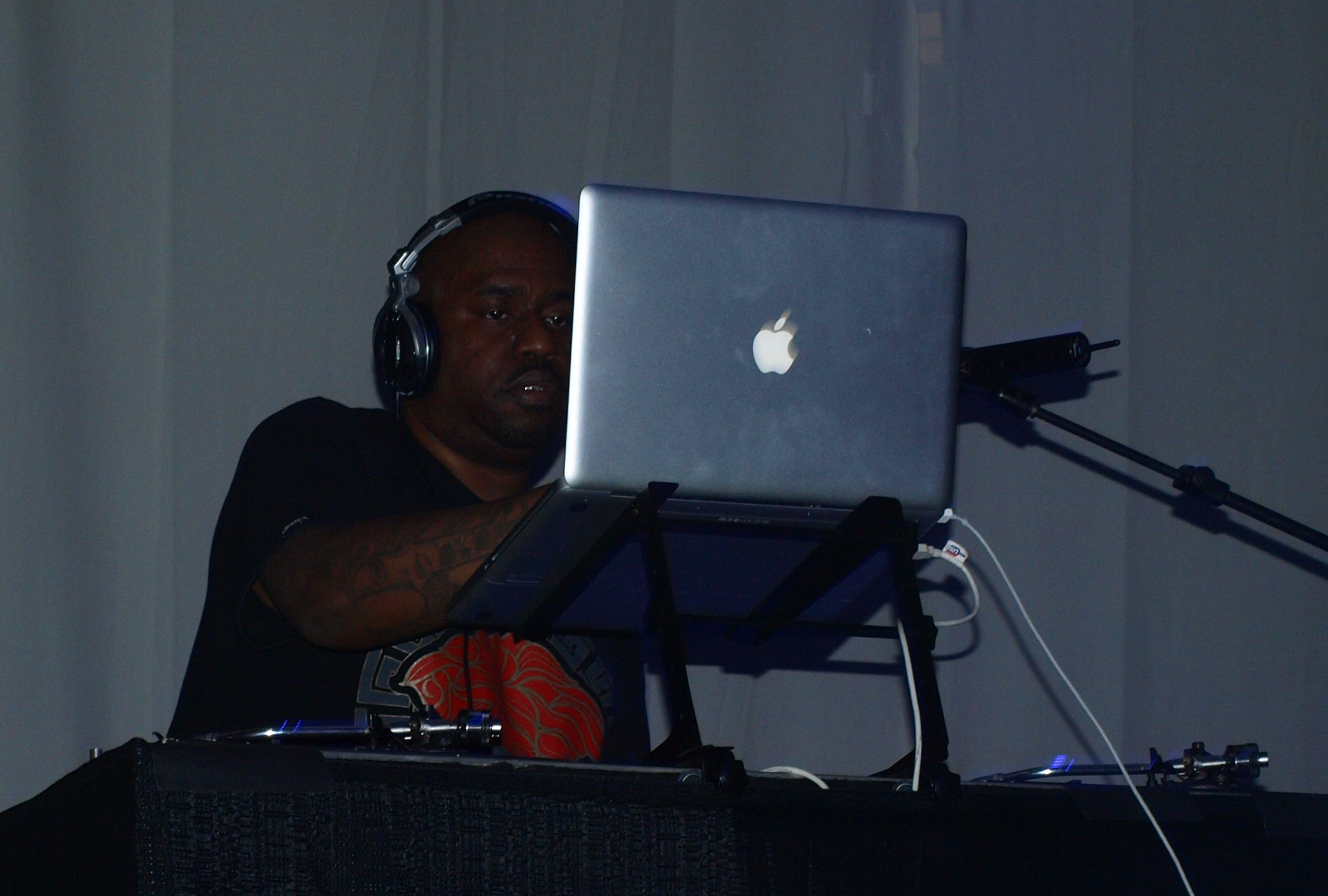
- DJ Homicide performing with Sugar Ray in 2009

Background information
- Born: Craig Anthony Bullock; December 17, 1970 (age 55); Pasadena, California, U.S.
- Genres: Hip hop; rock
- Occupations: Disc jockey; rapper; singer; record producer; radio personality
- Instruments: Turntables; samples; programming; keyboards; scratches; sound effects; vocals
- Years active: 1993–present
- Label: Pulse
- Formerly of: Sugar Ray

Craig Anthony Bullock (born December 17, 1970), also known by his stage name DJ Homicide, is an American DJ, rapper, singer, record producer and radio personality. He gained recognition as the DJ of the rock band Sugar Ray.

DJ Homicide hosts The Blast on SKEE 24/7 on Dash Radio.

== Career ==
On top of his work with Sugar Ray, Bullock spends a great deal of time as a solo artist, appearing as a featured DJ at nightclubs all across the country. At these performances he primarily plays mash-ups (both his own and others) as well as songs in their original format. The genre of his musical library is diverse, but primarily contemporary (1980s–present day). He has created three full-length promotional CD mixes; Live From Los Scandalous, Homicide's House and LASONIC. All were released under SKAM Artist records, as well as available for download through his websites.

Bullock was inspired to start DJing after listening to radio station KDAY and was briefly a member of The Alkaholiks. He joined Sugar Ray after the completion of their debut Lemonade and Brownies. His friend DJ Lethal worked on the CD but did not want to perform live with the band so he suggested his friend (Homicide). Bullock went on to join Sugar Ray officially.

Bullock's functions in the band were producing, writing and background vocals. Most notably he can be heard in the hook of "Every Morning" saying "Shut the door baby, don't say a word." When Sugar Ray performed "Fly" and "Mr. Bartender (It's So Easy)", Bullock would often rap in lieu of Super Cat and Prohoezak. Bullock improvised sound manipulations and digitally replaced the drum track when Stan Frazier chose to play acoustic guitar.

With the band, Bullock has appeared in the films Father's Day and Scooby-Doo and the TV show Las Vegas.

On August 22, 2010, it was announced on Sugar Ray's Twitter page that Bullock had left the band.
