= Sugar Ray =

American rock band

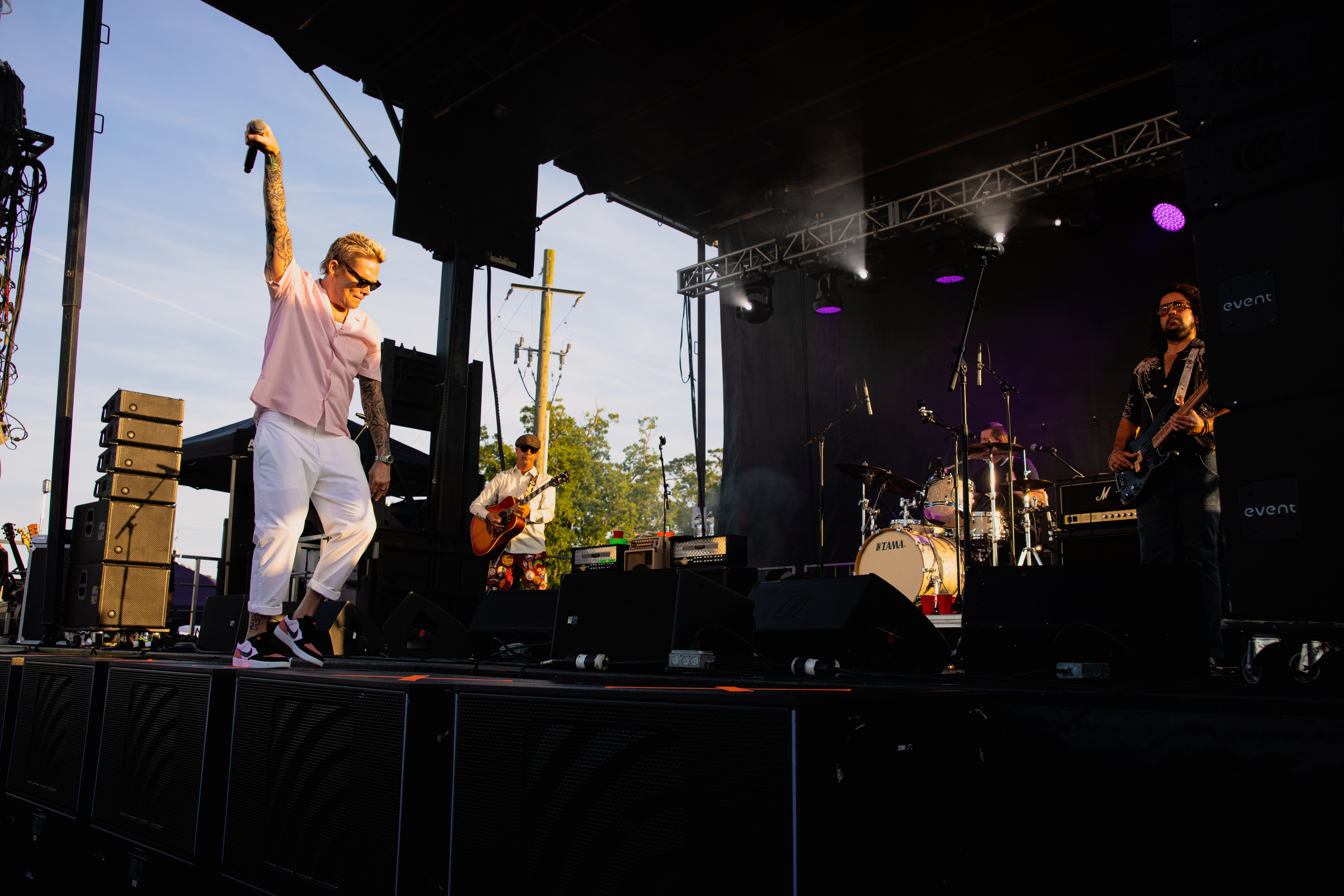
- Sugar Ray performing in 2024

Background information
- Also known as: Shrinky Dinx (1986–1994)
- Origin: Newport Beach, California, U.S.
- Genres: Alternative rock; pop rock; nu metal (early); funk metal (early)
- Years active: 1986–present
- Labels: Atlantic; Lava; Pulse; BMG
- Members: Mark McGrath; Rodney Sheppard; Dean Butterworth; Kristian Attard
- Past members: Stan Frazier; Murphy Karges; Craig "DJ Homicide" Bullock; Nic Edwards Stewart; Steve Gallagher; Al Keith; Jesse Bivona; Justin Bivona; Serg Dimitrijevic; Tim Hutton; Jason Ganberg
- Website: www.sugarray.com

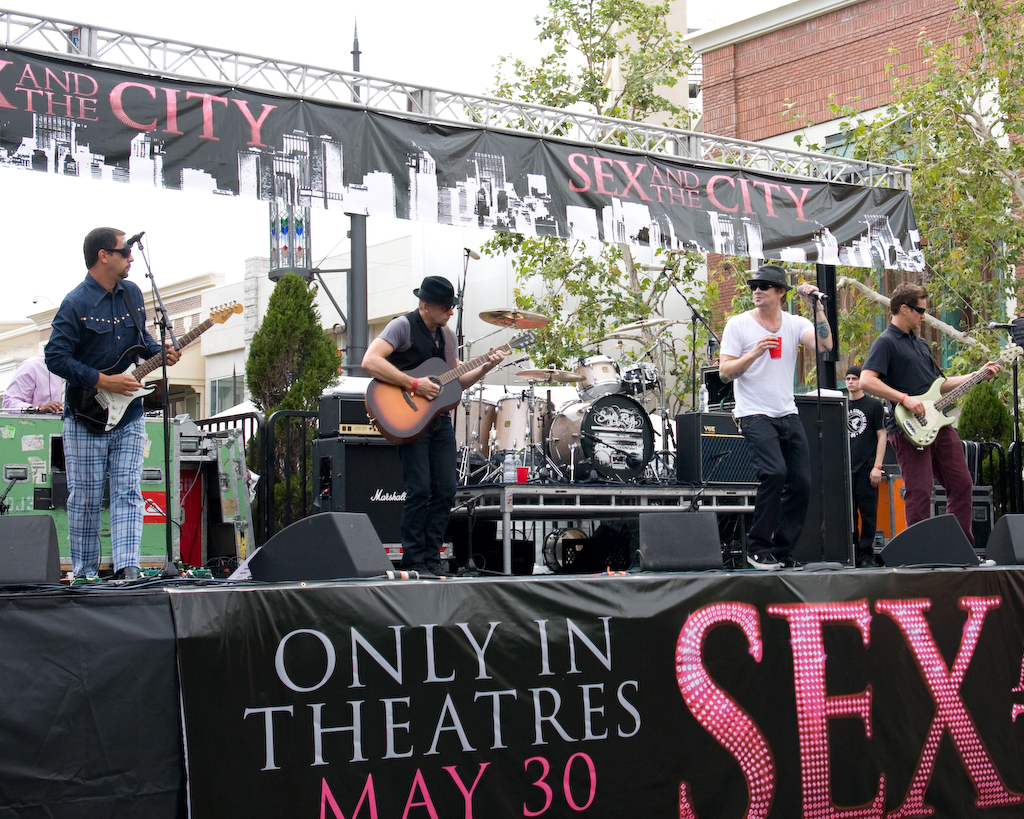
Sugar Ray performing in 2008

Sugar Ray is an American rock band formed in Newport Beach, California in 1986 that currently consists of Mark McGrath, Rodney Sheppard, Dean Butterworth, and Kristian Attard. Originally playing heavier nu metal and funk metal style music, the band shifted styles to a more radio-friendly pop sound after they achieved success with "Fly" (1997). The band then achieved success with "Every Morning" (1999), "Someday" (1999), "Falls Apart" (1999), "Answer the Phone" (2001), and "When It's Over" (2001). The band has released seven studio albums: Lemonade and Brownies (1995), Floored (1997), 14:59 (1999), Sugar Ray (2001), In the Pursuit of Leisure (2003), Music for Cougars (2009), and Little Yachty (2019).

== History ==
=== Formation and Lemonade and Brownies (1986–1996) ===
The band members grew up in Orange County, California. Rodney Sheppard played in several reggae bands and worked with future Good Charlotte drummer Dean Butterworth. In the late 1980s, prior to Sugar Ray, Sheppard and Stan Frazier played together in a band under the name The Tories. Later additions Murphy Karges and Mark McGrath changed the band's name to Shrinky Dinx (initially "Shrinky Dinks"). After signing with Atlantic Records, the name was changed to Sugar Ray, after Sugar Ray Leonard, upon threat of a lawsuit from the Milton Bradley Company, maker of the Shrinky Dinks toy.

The band's debut album, Lemonade and Brownies, was released in 1995 and though it was not a commercial success, it did earn the band recognition in alternative music circles. It included the song "Mean Machine", which peaked at No. 45 on the Radio & Records active rock chart.

=== Floored (1997–1998) ===
The band's first mainstream hit was "Fly", released in May 1997. It was included on the album Floored and featured reggae musician Super Cat. "Fly" did not sound anything at all like the rest of the tracks on the album and received frequent radio play, reaching number 1 on Billboard's Airplay List. As a result of the success of "Fly", Floored sold well and achieved the RIAA certification of double platinum. By the end of 1997, critics were skeptical that Sugar Ray could put out another successful song and labeled them a one-hit wonder. The same year, Sugar Ray was featured in the movie Fathers' Day, starring Billy Crystal and Robin Williams.

Sugar Ray played on the Vans Warped Tour in 1997.

=== 14:59 (1999–2000) ===
14:59, released in January 1999, was the band's reply to suggestions that they were a one-hit wonder, with the title implying that their 15 minutes of fame were not quite up — their "fame clock" read 14:59.

"Every Morning", which was widely compared to "Fly", had similar success during the spring of 1999, reaching number 3 on the U.S. Billboard Hot 100 chart. When asked about the band's change of style, bassist Murphy Karges said, "We never had any credibility. Nobody ever gave us any so how could we lose any?"

Their follow-up single "Someday" also enjoyed extensive airplay later that year and reached number 7 in the U.S. "Falls Apart" reached number 29 in early 2000. 14:59 outsold its predecessor and was certified triple platinum.

The band toured in support of the album, and were scheduled to perform at Woodstock '99 but McGrath fell ill, with nodules on his throat, and they cancelled.

In 2000, Sugar Ray did a cover version of John Cale and Brian Eno's song "Spinning Away" for the soundtrack to the film The Beach.

=== Sugar Ray (2001–2002) ===
Sugar Ray, released in June 2001, included "When It's Over", which reached number 13 in the U.S. "Answer the Phone" peaked at number 33 on the US Adult Pop Airplay chart and number 39 on the Mainstream Top 40 chart in late 2001.

Due to the band's popularity, the band made a cameo appearance in Scooby-Doo in 2002.

=== In the Pursuit of Leisure and The Best of Sugar Ray (2003–2005) ===
In the Pursuit of Leisure, released in June 2003, contains the band's cover of Joe Jackson's "Is She Really Going Out With Him?". ProHoeZak guested live with the band in 2003 having appeared on "Mr. Bartender (It's So Easy)".

In 2005, Sugar Ray released a greatest hits album, The Best of Sugar Ray, with three new songs, "Shot of Laughter", "Time After Time", and "Psychedelic Bee".

=== Inactivity and Music for Cougars (2006–2009) ===
The band then went into a period of relative inactivity. In September 2004, Mark McGrath became an anchor on the television show Extra.

In January 2006, Sugar Ray was released from their recording contract with Atlantic Records.

In mid-2007, their previously unreleased song "Into Yesterday" was used on the Surf's Up movie soundtrack, and the band made brief tour in Asia in August 2007 where they headlined Singfest.

Jason Bernard, a music producer and friend of the band brought them a deal to sign with his label, Pulse Recordings, and the band recorded their next album, Music for Cougars, released in July 2009. The first single was "Boardwalk". Some critics noted that McGrath aimed to lower people's expectations for the album during its promotion by saying things like: "I know people aren't sitting on the edge of their seats waiting for a Sugar Ray album, but that wasn't the point."

=== Lineup changes and 1990s nostalgia touring (2010–2017) ===
Craig "DJ Homicide" Bullock left the band in 2010.

In 2011, the band had what McGrath described as not "the highest-grossing year for Sugar Ray".

Murphy Karges and Stan Frazier left in 2012, one not wanting to tour anymore, and the other taking a job with Aaron Rodgers. This left Rodney Sheppard and McGrath as the remaining original members. Percussionist Al Keith, bassist Justin Bivona, and drummer Jesse Bivona, were hired as replacements.

In a lawsuit filed in October 2013, Karges and Frazier claimed that McGrath forced them and Bullock out of the band to be able to claim a higher share of revenues.

In 2012, McGrath worked with Art Alexakis, frontman and vocalist of Everclear, on starting up a 1990s nostalgia tour, the "Summerland" tour, which included Marcy Playground, Gin Blossoms, and Lit.

Percussionist Al Keith (Khalil Al-Rashad) injured his foot in July 2012 at Del Mar Fairgrounds in Del Mar, California, during the song "Fly". He was absent from shows until August 2012. The tour was deemed a success, and McGrath initially spoke of the possibility of it becoming a yearly event.

McGrath announced a "Mark McGrath & Friends" tour, in which the band would perform alongside other 1990s alternative rock bands Smash Mouth, Spin Doctors, and Vertical Horizon, on a cruise ship, though the plans were cancelled, with the idea losing support after the Carnival Triumph cruise ship disaster.

McGrath and Alexakis disagreed on the future direction for the "Summerland" tour, leading to Sugar Ray leaving its 2013 incarnation in favor of starting a rival nostalgia tour called "Under the Sun", which ran from 2013 to 2015.

For the tour, drummer Jesse Bivona and bassist Justin Bivona were temporarily replaced by drummer Dean Butterworth and bassist Serg Dimitrijevic, as the Bivona brothers' band The Interrupters are opening for Rancid.

McGrath released an EP as a solo EP entitled Summertime's Coming in 2015.

Drummer Jesse Bivona and bassist Justin Bivona left Sugar Ray in 2016. Drummer Dean Butterworth became a full member in fall 2014, while bassist Kristian Attard became a full member in 2016.

=== Little Yachty (2019–present) ===
In June 2019, ten years after the band last released music, Sugar Ray signed with BMG Rights Management and signed a talent management agreement with APA.

In July 2019, the band released Little Yachty. The album title is a reference to both the rapper Lil Yachty and the fact that McGrath views Sugar Ray as a "yacht rock" band.

In September 2025, the band performed at an NFL game between the Arizona Cardinals and the Carolina Panthers.

== Musical style ==
Sugar Ray's sound originally fused hair metal and hardcore punk with sampledelic hip-hop, new wave, disco, and dub. This sound has been predominantly categorized as nu metal and funk metal, as well as alternative metal, hard rock, punk rock, punk metal, and rap metal. Music critic Stephen Thomas Erlewine described the band's early sound as a fusion of metal, funk, reggae, and rap. He also stated that after the success of their hit "Fly" they "no longer tried to ape the Red Hot Chili Peppers."

Regarding the band's first two albums, singer Mark McGrath stated, "we were the Chili Peppers with zero talent. [...] Out of necessity we kind of became known as a metal band, a little pre nu-metal type rap rock thing before there was rap rock."

Sugar Ray shifted to a pop rock sound following the mainstream success of "Fly", beginning with their third studio album, 14:59 (1999).

The band's later music has been categorized as skate punk, pop, and alternative pop.

The band's overall sound, throughout its shifts in style, has been characterized as alternative rock.

== Awards and nominations ==
| Award | Year | Nominee(s) | Category | Result | Ref. |
|---|---|---|---|---|---|
| BMI Pop Awards | 1999 | "Fly" | Award-Winning Songs | Won | |
| BMI Pop Awards | 2001 | "Falls Apart" | Award-Winning Songs | Won | |
| BMI Pop Awards | 2002 | "When It's Over" | Award-Winning Songs | Won | |
| Billboard Music Awards | 1999 | Themselves | Top Duo/Group | Nominated | |
| Billboard Music Awards | 1999 | Themselves | Top Hot 100 Artist - Duo/Group | Nominated | |
| Billboard Music Awards | 1999 | Themselves | Top Hot Top 40 Artist | Nominated | |
| Billboard Music Awards | 1999 | Themselves | Top Adult Top 40 Artist | Nominated | |
| Billboard Music Awards | 1999 | Themselves | Top Modern Rock Artist | Nominated | |
| Billboard Music Awards | 1999 | "Every Morning" | Top Hot 100 Airplay | Nominated | |
| Billboard Music Awards | 1999 | "Every Morning" | Top Hot Top 40 Track | Nominated | |
| Billboard Music Awards | 1999 | "Every Morning" | Top Adult Top 40 Track | Nominated | |
| Billboard Music Awards | 1999 | "Every Morning" | Top Modern Rock Track | Nominated | |
| Billboard Music Video Awards | 1999 | "Every Morning" | Best Pop Clip | Nominated | |
| Blockbuster Entertainment Awards | 1998 | Floored | Favorite Group – Modern Rock | Won | |
| International Dance Music Awards | 1998 | "Fly" | Best Alternative 12" | Won | |
| Online Music Awards | 1999 | Themselves | Favorite Rock Group | Nominated | |
| Teen Choice Awards | 2000 | Themselves | Choice Rock Group | Nominated | |
| Teen Choice Awards | 2000 | "Someday" | Choice Single | Nominated | |
| Teen Choice Awards | 2001 | North American Tour | Choice Concert | Nominated | |
| Teen Choice Awards | 2001 | Mark McGrath | Choice Male Hottie | Nominated | |
| Teen Choice Awards | 2005 | Mark McGrath | Choice TV: Male Personality | Nominated | |

== Band members ==
=== Current ===
- Mark McGrath – lead vocals, rhythm guitar, additional percussion (1986–present)
- Rodney Sheppard – lead guitar, backing vocals, ukulele (1986–present)
- Dean Butterworth – drums, percussion, programming, backing vocals (touring substitute 2013–2016; 2016–present)
- Kristian Attard – bass, backing vocals, keyboards (touring substitute 2014–2016; 2016–present)

=== Former ===
- Stan Frazier – drums, percussion, additional studio guitar, programming, backing vocals (1986–2012)
- Murphy Karges – bass, backing vocals, additional studio guitar (1986–2012)
- Craig "DJ Homicide" Bullock – turntables, sampler, additional programming, keyboards, backing vocals (1995–2010)
- Al Keith – percussion, vibes (2010–2013)
- Jesse Bivona – drums, percussion, programming, backing vocals (touring substitute 2011, 2018; 2012–2016)
- Justin Bivona – bass, backing vocals (touring substitute 2011; 2012–2016)

=== Former touring musicians ===
- Nic Edwards Stewart – drums, percussion, backing vocals (1996; substitute for Stan Frazier)
- Steve Gallagher – drums (2005; substitute for Stan Frazier)
- Serg Dimitrijevic – bass, backing vocals (2013–2014)
- Tim Hutton – bass, backing vocals (2015, 2018)
- Jason Ganberg – drums, percussion, backing vocals (2016, 2017, 2018)

== Discography ==
- Lemonade and Brownies (1995)
- Floored (1997)
- 14:59 (1999)
- Sugar Ray (2001)
- In the Pursuit of Leisure (2003)
- Music for Cougars (2009)
- Little Yachty (2019)
