= Mark McGrath =

American singer and television host (born 1968)

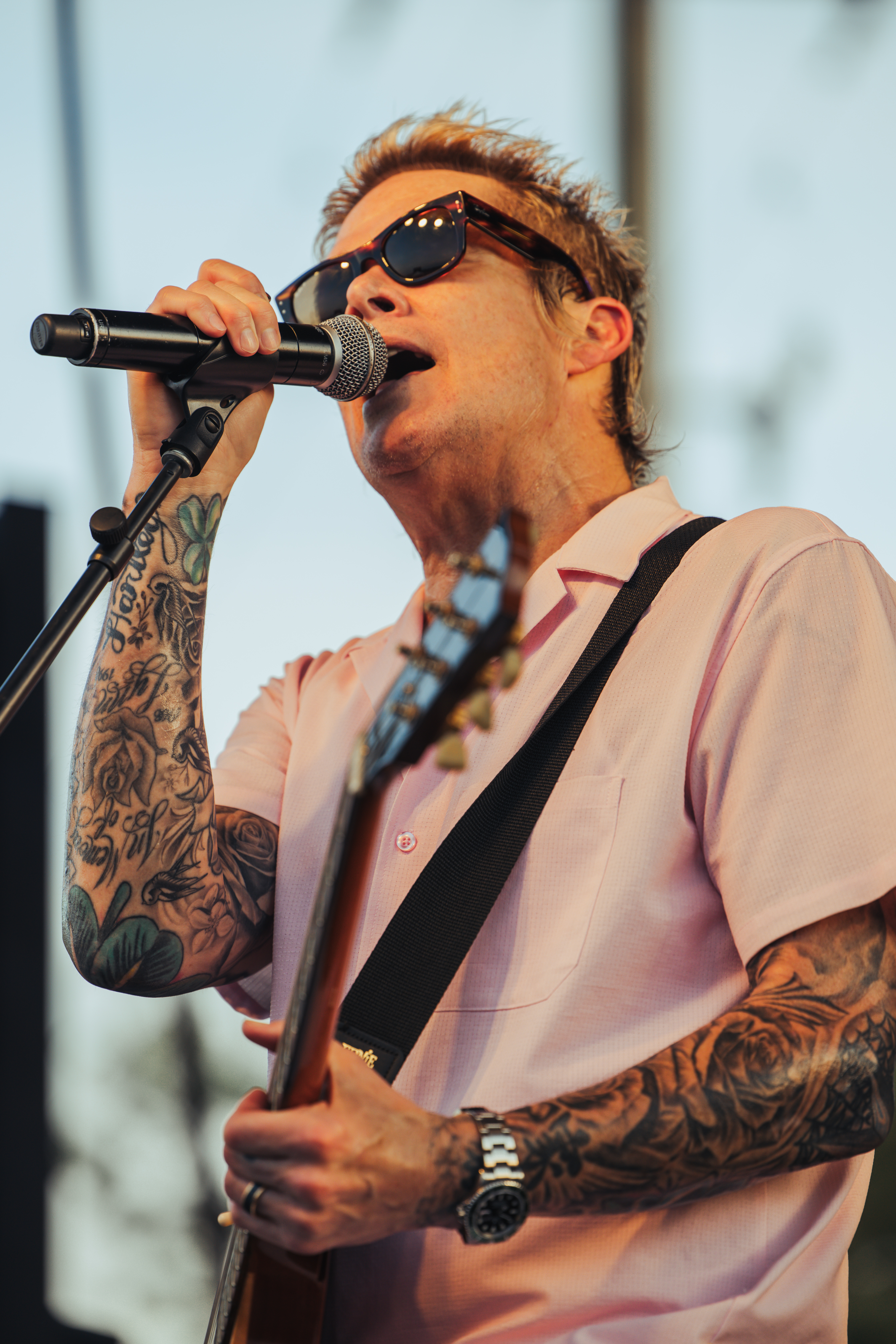
- McGrath performing in 2024

Background information
- Born: Mark Sayers McGrath; March 15, 1968 (age 58); Hartford, Connecticut, U.S.
- Origin: Newport Beach, California, U.S.
- Genres: Pop rock; alternative rock; nu metal; funk metal; alternative metal; punk rock; reggae
- Occupations: Singer; television host; actor
- Years active: 1992–present
- Spouse: Carin Kingsland (m. 2012)

Mark Sayers McGrath (born March 15, 1968) is an American singer who is the lead vocalist of the rock band Sugar Ray. McGrath is also known for his work as a co-host of Extra, and he was the host of Don't Forget the Lyrics! in 2010. McGrath hosted the second season of the TV show Killer Karaoke, taking the place of Jackass star Steve-O.

== Early life ==
McGrath was born in Hartford, Connecticut. His family moved from Connecticut to Newport Beach, California when he was eight years old. He attended Corona del Mar High School in Newport Beach and later the University of Southern California in Los Angeles, where he majored in communications, graduating in 1990. After college, McGrath entered a state of depression and apathy until his friend McG brought him to help in a job driving a delivery truck, where McGrath decided to continue his musical career.

== Music career ==
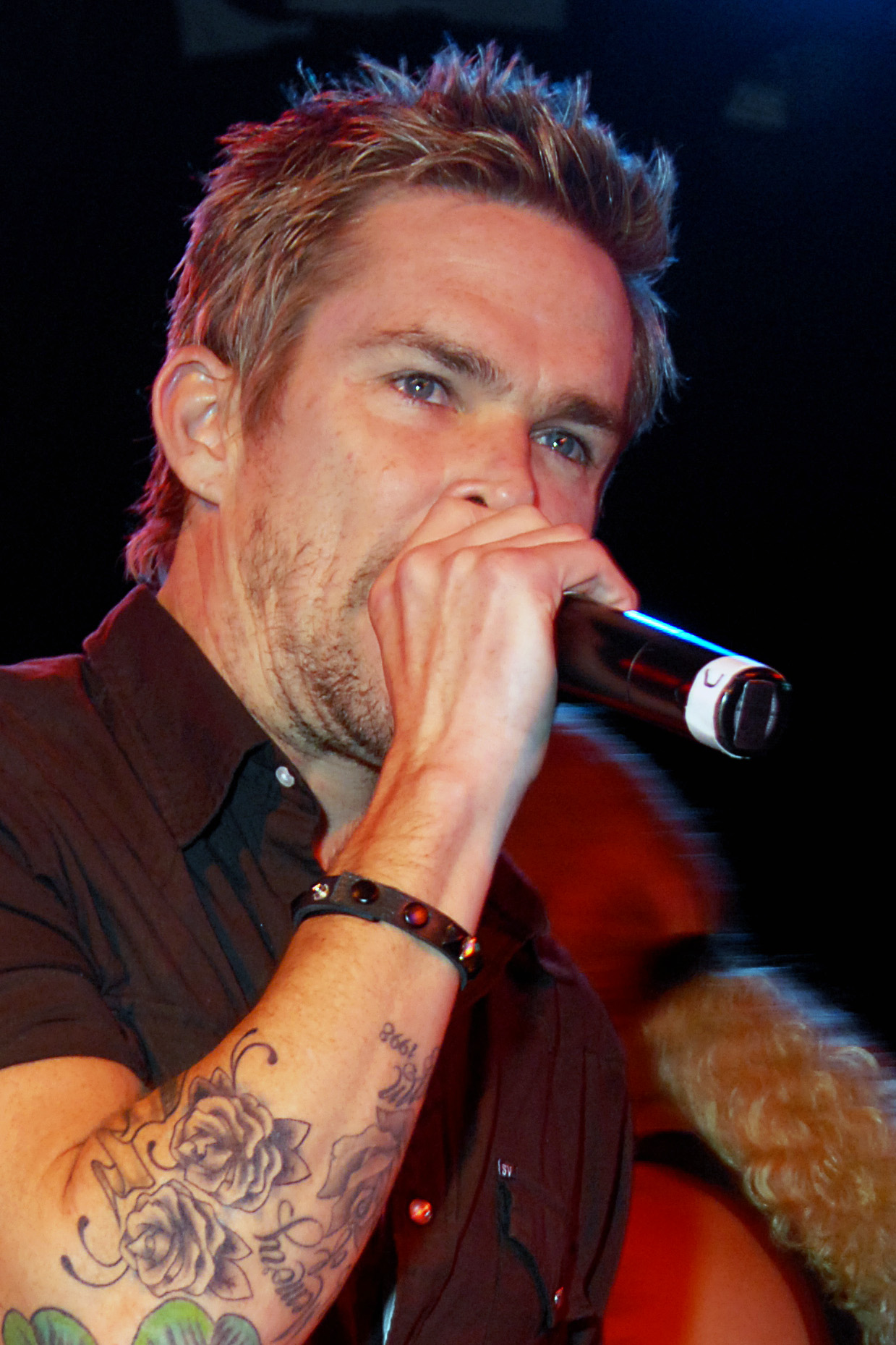
McGrath in 2009

McGrath, Rodney Sheppard, Murphy Karges, and Stan Frazier formed Sugar Ray in Orange County, California in 1992. In 1994, the band signed with Atlantic Records. Their first success came in 1997 with the song "Fly."

McGrath's popularity soared as he appeared on the covers of national magazines such as Rolling Stone and Spin. He also made numerous appearances on MTV, VH1, and various talk and awards shows. People magazine named him the "Sexiest Rocker" of 1998.

McGrath contributed the track "Reaching Out" on Strait Up, a tribute album to late vocalist James Lynn Strait, whom he has a dedication tattoo to memorialize. He appeared in the video of "Angel's Son", another song written for the album by Sevendust, and performed with the band during their appearance on The Tonight Show with Jay Leno.

In 2012, McGrath and Everclear's Art Alexakis organized the SummerLand Tour, consisting of Sugar Ray, Everclear, Lit, Marcy Playground, and Gin Blossoms. McGrath and Alexakis decided to split ways in 2013, and McGrath formed the "Under the Sun Tour" with Sugar Ray, Smash Mouth, Gin Blossoms, Vertical Horizon, and Fastball.

He appeared in Smashing Pumpkins' Silvery Sometimes (Ghosts) video, released in October 2018.

He is also a DJ. On weekends, he hosts a show on SiriusXM's 90s on 9, the 120.

== Television career ==
McGrath is a three-time champion of Rock & Roll Jeopardy! on VH1. In the finals, he won against Dave Mustaine of Megadeth and Gary Dell'Abate of The Howard Stern Show. He and his band Sugar Ray performed as themselves in the 2002 Scooby-Doo movie, starring Freddie Prinze Jr. and Sarah Michelle Gellar. In 2004, he and his band performed in the series Las Vegas (Season 1, Episode 19).

In 2004, McGrath began his work as co-host of the Extra television show on September 13, after a producer noticed his work hosting various VH1 and MTV programs and asked him to join. McGrath left the show in July 2008 to focus on his music career.

He served as a guest judge for American Idol auditions aired in early 2005. He was a guest star in a 2005 episode of Law and Order: SVU. McGrath received the part of Dex Lawson on The WB show Charmed in 2005, but he ultimately turned it down due to scheduling conflicts, and Jason Lewis replaced him. McGrath was the host of Pussycat Dolls Present: The Search for the Next Doll (2007) and Pussycat Dolls Present: Girlicious (2008).

In 2010, McGrath began hosting the third season of Don't Forget the Lyrics, which aired on syndication. He appeared on The Celebrity Apprentice Season 4, which premiered in March 2011, where he was fired in week six and finished in tenth place.

In 2013, he appeared on Celebrity Wife Swap and the penultimate episode, "A.A.R.M.", of The Office. McGrath continued his TV appearances in 2014 and 2015 by guest starring on The Neighbors and Workaholics. McGrath also hosted truTv's Killer Karaoke and starred in Sharknado 2: The Second One. In 2016, he appeared in the pilot episode of Lady Dynamite, portraying himself.

In 2018, he was announced as one of the eleven houseguests to be competing on the first American edition of Celebrity Big Brother. He finished in third place, tied with Ariadna Gutiérrez. McGrath also appeared in the second season as a special guest.

In 2021, McGrath competed on the fifth season of The Masked Singer as the wild card contestant "Orca". Also in 2021, he became the host and narrator of the documentary television series Dark Side of the 90s.

On December 19, 2022, McGrath appeared on the first episode of the American version of “The Wheel”. He was one of the celebrities helping the contestants win money.

In 2023, he became the host and narrator of the documentary television series Dark Side of the 2000s.

== Personal life ==
He married beautician Carin Kingsland on September 24, 2012. The couple met in 1994 and were engaged on New Year's Eve 2009 after 16 years of on-and-off dating. McGrath and Kingsland are parents to twins, a boy and a girl, born on April 29, 2010.

== Discography ==
=== Sugar Ray studio albums ===
- Lemonade and Brownies (1995)
- Floored (1997)
- 14:59 (1999)
- Sugar Ray (2001)
- In the Pursuit of Leisure (2003)
- Music for Cougars (2009)
- Little Yachty (2019)

=== Solo EP ===
- Summertime's Coming (2015)

=== Singles ===
- "Party for Two" (Pop Version) – Shania Twain featuring Mark McGrath
- "Do It Again" – Mike Love featuring McGrath and John Stamos (2017)

== Filmography ==
List of film, television, and web appearances
Year	Title	Role	Notes	Ref.
1997	Fathers' Day	self	with Sugar Ray	
1997	Oddville, MTV	self	with Sugar Ray, episode# 23	
1998	Rock & Roll Jeopardy!	Mark McGrath		
2001	The Drew Carey Show	self	Season 7, episode 2 (uncredited)	
2002	Scooby-Doo	self	with Sugar Ray	
2003	Pauly Shore Is Dead	Assholf golfer		
2003	Uptown Girls	Rock Star		
2004	Las Vegas	Mark McGrath	Season 1, episode 19	
2004–2008	Extra	Mark McGrath	Co–host	
2005	American Idol	Mark McGrath	Season 5 guest judge	
2005	Law & Order: Special Victims Unit	J. J. Price	Season 7, episode 2	
2007	Pussycat Dolls Present: The Search for the Next Doll	Mark McGrath	Co–host	
2008	Pussycat Dolls Present: Girlicious	Mark McGrath	Co–host	
2010	Darker Side of Green	Modedrator	Web series	
2010	Don't Forget the Lyrics!	Mark McGrath	Host season 3	
2011	The Apprentice	Mark McGrath	Season 11	
2011	Master Debaters with Jay Mohr	self	Season 1, episode 4	
2011	Fact Checkers Unit	DJ Booth	3 episodes	
2012	Celebrity Wife Swap	Mark McGrath	Season 2	
2013	The Office	Mark McGrath	Season 9, episode 22	
2013	Hot Package	self	Host	
2014	Killer Karaoke	Mark McGrath	Host season 2	
2014	The Neighbors	John	Season 2, episode 13	
2014	Sharknado 2: The Second One	Martin Brody		
2014	CollegeHumor Originals	Mark	Season 1, episode 616	
2015	Workaholics	Mark McGrath	Season 5, episode 13	
2015	Joe Dirt 2: Beautiful Loser	Jimmy Yauch		
2015	Sharknado 3: Oh Hell No!	Martin Brody		
2016	Lady Dynamite	Mark McGrath	2 episodes	
2018	The Thundermans	Uncle Mark McGrath	Season 4, episode 17	
2018	Celebrity Big Brother	Mark McGrath	Main season 1, guest season 2	
2018	The Last Sharknado: It's About Time	Martin		
2019	2nd Chance for Christmas	Ghost of Jack Love		
2020	Let's Be Real	Mark McGrath		
2021	The Masked Singer	Orca/Mark McGrath	Season 5	
2021–2022	Dark Side of the 90s	Narrator		
2022	The Wheel	Mark McGrath	Guest celebrity, 1 episode	
2021–2022	Dark Side of the 2000s	Narrator		
