= Fly (Sugar Ray song) =

1997 single by Sugar Ray

Single by Sugar Ray

from the album Floored
- B-side: "Tap, Twist, Snap"
- Released: May 16, 1997
- Genre: Alternative rock; reggae; reggae fusion; pop rock
- Length: 4:04 (original); 4:52 (featuring Super Cat)
- Label: Atlantic; Lava
- Songwriter: Sugar Ray
- Producer: David Kahne

Sugar Ray singles chronology
"Iron Mic" (1996)	"Fly" (1997)	"RPM" (1997)

Music video
- "Fly" on YouTube

"Fly" is a song by American rock band Sugar Ray. It appears on their 1997 album Floored twice: one version with reggae artist Super Cat (track 4) and the other without (track 13). The song was serviced to US radio in May 1997.

"Fly" became the band's first hit, holding the No. 1 spot on the US Billboard Hot 100 Airplay chart for four consecutive weeks and spending eight weeks at No. 1 on the Modern Rock Tracks chart. The song also reached No. 1 on Canada's RPM 100 Hit Tracks chart and entered the top 40 in Australia and Iceland. The song was included on VH1's countdown of the "100 Greatest Songs of the '90s" at number 52. A 20th anniversary 7-inch vinyl was released for the song in 2017.

== Composition and music ==
"Fly" is an alternative rock, reggae, reggae fusion, and pop rock song, that incorporates elements of dancehall and ska.

Sugar Ray's lead singer Mark McGrath explained that this song had a bouncy beat, yet it was about death; 'Fly' too seemed like a bright, up-tempo song but "there is this stark imagery in there. There's loss in it. There is loss of a mother, obviously. I thought it was a good way to juxtapose the lyrics with the melody on that, similar to what Gilbert O'Sullivan did on 'Alone Again (Naturally)'." The other members wrote it without him as McGrath left during a rehearsal, and McGrath originally did not want to record the song and was downright wanting to quit the band, as he was preferring heavier music, "just wanted to scream and yell because I was scared to be onstage in the first place", and afraid his voice would not work with a mellower tune. His friend McG, who would eventually direct the video for 'Fly', convinced him otherwise, telling about the song's merits and asking "Where else you gonna go—work at Del Taco?"

== Track listings ==
Australian, European, and UK CD single

1. "Fly" (edit featuring Super Cat) – 3:58
2. "Tap, Twist, Snap" – 3:12
3. "Fly" (rock edit) – 3:58

UK 7-inch single

A. "Fly" (edit featuring Super Cat) – 3:58
B. "Fly" (rock edit) – 3:58

== Charts ==
=== Weekly charts ===
Chart (1997–1998)	Peak position
Australia (ARIA)	31
Canada Top Singles (RPM)	1
Canada Adult Contemporary (RPM)	21
Canada Rock/Alternative (RPM)	1
Iceland (Íslenski Listinn Topp 40)	21
Netherlands (Dutch Top 40 Tipparade)	3
Netherlands (Single Top 100)	64
Scottish Singles Sales (Official Charts)	57
UK Singles (Official Charts)	58
US Radio Songs (Billboard)	1
US Adult Alternative Airplay (Billboard)	18
US Adult Pop Airplay (Billboard)	2
US Alternative Airplay (Billboard)	1
US Mainstream Rock (Billboard)	29
US Pop Airplay (Billboard)	1
US Rhythmic Airplay (Billboard)	8

=== Year-end charts ===
Chart (1997)	Position
Canada Top Singles (RPM)	6
US Hot 100 Airplay (Billboard)	17
US Adult Top 40 (Billboard)	30
US Modern Rock Tracks (Billboard)	2
US Rhythmic Top 40 (Billboard)	74
US Top 40/Mainstream (Billboard)	25

Chart (1998)	Position
Canada Top Singles (RPM)	39
US Hot 100 Airplay (Billboard)	16
US Adult Top 40 (Billboard)	22
US Mainstream Top 40 (Billboard)	31
US Modern Rock Tracks (Billboard)	99
US Rhythmic Top 40 (Billboard)	61

== Release history ==
Region	Date	Format(s)	Label(s)	Ref.
United States	May 16, 1997	Mainstream rock; modern rock; AC radio	Atlantic; Lava	
United States	August 5, 1997	Contemporary hit radio	Atlantic; Lava	
United Kingdom	January 19, 1998	7-inch vinyl; CD; cassette	Atlantic; Lava	

== See also ==
- List of RPM number-one singles of 1997
- List of RPM Rock/Alternative number-one singles
- List of Mainstream Top 40 number-one hits of 1997 (U.S.)
- Number one modern rock hits of 1997
