= Stan Frazier (musician) =

American drummer

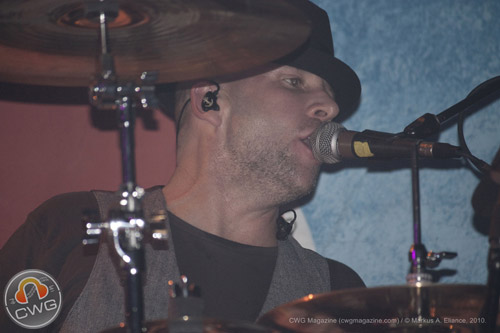
- Frazier performing with Sugar Ray in 2010

Background information
- Born: Charles Stanton Frazier; April 23, 1968 (age 58)
- Origin: Newport Beach, California
- Genres: Alternative rock; pop rock; punk rock; nu metal
- Instruments: Drums; percussion; guitar; programming; vocals
- Years active: 1992–present
- Labels: Atlantic; Pulse
- Website: stanfrazier.com

Charles Stanton "Coote" Frazier (born April 23, 1968) is an American musician, record producer, singer, songwriter and restaurateur. He co-founded Sugar Ray in 1992 and was the band's principal songwriter and drummer until 2012. Frazier served as the producer for tracks and albums by Sugar Ray, Dirty Heads and Ashlee Simpson. In 2012, he starred on the BBC culinary reality show Chef Race, UK vs US and won a prize of $100,000.

Frazier is the co-owner of the Original Sgt. Pepperoni's Pizza and A's Restaurant in Newport Beach, California.

In February 2018, Stan announced formation of a new band "The SIDE DEAL" with Charlie Colin (Train), and Joel & Scott Owen (PawnShop kings). Side Deal performed live with other notable artists such as Jeff “Skunk” Baxter (The Doobie Brothers, Steely Dan) and Alice Cooper.

== Life and career ==
Frazier was born and raised in Newport Beach, Orange County, California.

He is married to Jennifer Casinelli-Frazier.

While attending Corona del Mar High School Stan & friends formed a cover band inspired by the group The Jam. That band, initially called The Tories, went on to become The Shrinky Dinx, and eventually became Sugar Ray.

He was the lead writer of Sugar Ray's "Fly" which includes a lyric about his mother's death. Though "Fly" turned out to be the band's biggest hit, Stan was initially against it since its pop-feel was, at the time, a departure from the band's sound.

He has two dogs: Chloe and Lady. Both of whom can be seen on the inside sleeve of the 2001 Sugar Ray self-titled album.

Stan has appeared in the films Scooby-Doo and Father's Day, as well as the TV series Las Vegas.

On BBC America reality show, Chef Race, UK vs US (premiered October 2, 2012, finale November 28, 2012), he was one of eight American chefs facing off against eight British chefs in a series of elimination challenges as the teams traveled from San Diego, CA to New York, NY (billed as "the ultimate cross-country culinary challenge"). Throughout the series, Stan used his experience from cooking for the band on the road.
