= Island mentality =

Self-perceived superiority within isolated communities

Island mentality is the notion of isolated communities perceiving themselves as exceptional or superior to the rest of the world. This term does not directly refer to an island or other geographically confined society, but to the cultural, moral, or ideological superiority of a community or a person that lacks social exposure to the outside world. Island mentality can be characterized by narrow-mindedness, ignorance, or outright hostility towards any artifact (concept, ideology, lifestyle choice, art form, etc.) originating from outside the geographic area inhabited by the society.

The term "island mentality" is also used in some psychological research to describe individuals who dislike or have problems relating to others and then live as loners or "islands". This concept (in which people may feel inferior, afraid, or alone) is unrelated to the above terminology.

== See also ==
- Ethnocentrism
- Exceptionalism
- Galápagos syndrome
- Groupthink
- Light unto the nations
- Not invented here
- Shtetl
- Siege mentality
- World famous in New Zealand
- Big-fish–little-pond effect
