= 15 minutes of fame =

Short-lived media publicity or celebrity

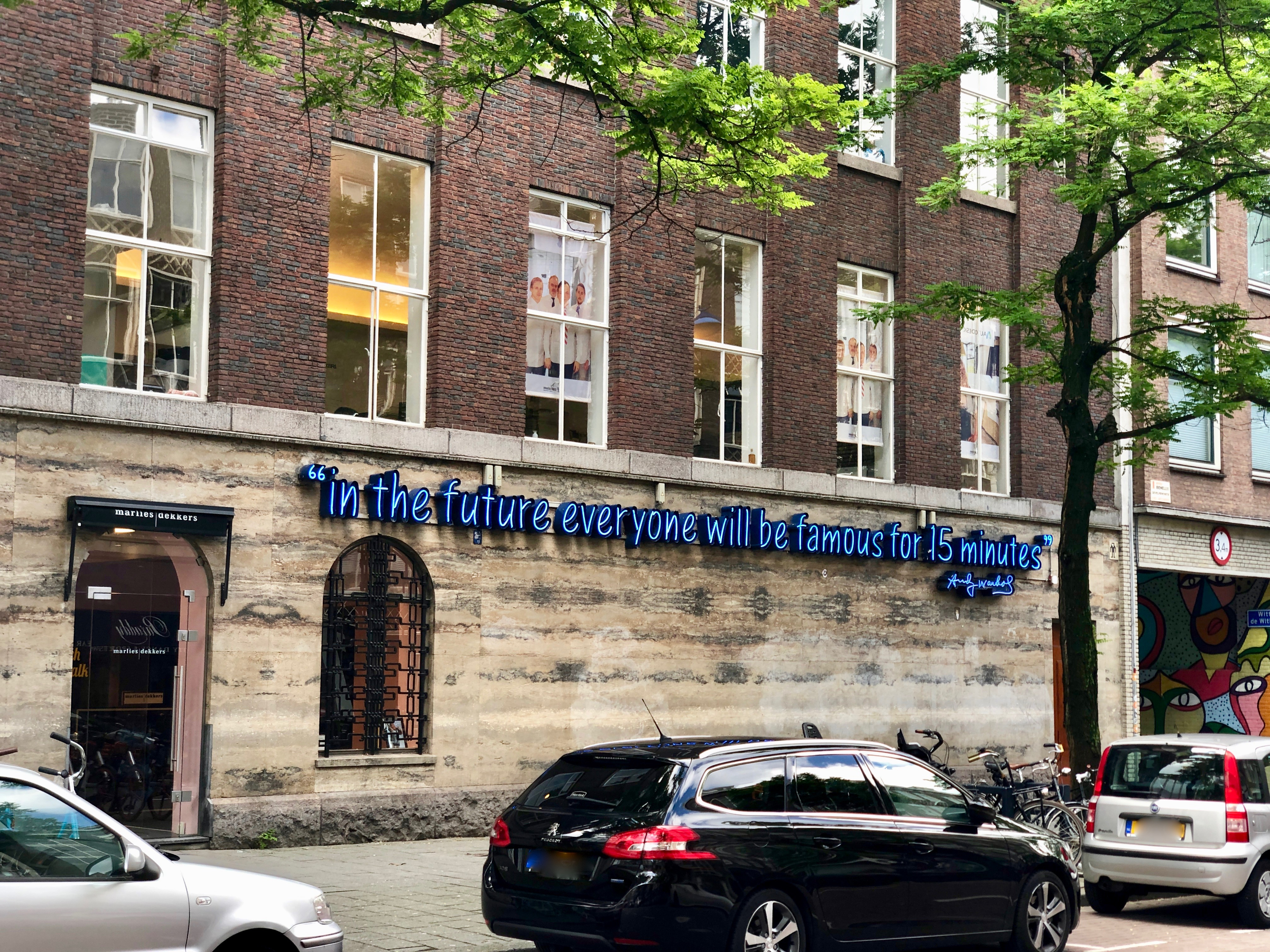
The quote displayed on a building of fashion designer Marlies Dekkers in Rotterdam, Netherlands, in 2019

"15 minutes of fame" is an expression describing the short-lived media publicity or celebrity of an individual or phenomenon. It was formulated by Andy Warhol, who was quoted by Time magazine in 1967 as saying that one day "everyone will be famous for 15 minutes". The phenomenon is often used in reference to figures in the entertainment industry or other areas of popular culture, such as reality television and YouTube. An older version of the same concept in English is the expression "nine days' wonder". This phrase dates at least as far back as the Elizabethan era, when it was used by the actor and dancer William Kempe.

== Origins ==
The phrase "quart-d'heure de célébrité" (fifteen minutes of fame) was used in French during the 19th century, notably by Alphonse Daudet in an article titled "Villemessant", first published in 1879: "de braves garçons [...] ont eu, pour une heureuse trouvaille de quinze lignes, leur quart-d'heure de célébrité" ("some young fellows have had [...] thanks to fifteen cleverly-written lines, their fifteen minutes of fame"). Another French phrase, with the same meaning, "quart-d'heure de popularité" (fifteen minutes of popularity) appears in 1821, in Histoire de l'Assemblée constituante (tome premier), by Charles Lacretelle: "le tribun [...], pour un quart-d'heure de popularité, portait le premier coup de hache sur nos monuments" ("the orator [...], for fifteen minutes of popularity, dealt the first blow to our monuments").

The phrase "15 minutes of fame" is attributed to Andy Warhol and encapsulates his perspective on celebrity culture. It was first cited in a 1967 Time magazine article titled "Master of the Monumentalists" about sculptor Tony Smith, which noted:

In the year 1967, the styles and statements of America's brash, brilliant and often infuriating contemporary artists have not only become available to the man in the street, but are virtually unavoidable. And with proliferation comes confusion. Whole new schools of painting seem to charge through the art scene with the speed of an express train, causing Pop Artist Andy Warhol to predict the day "when everyone will be famous for 15 minutes."

In a catalog for a 1968 exhibition of Warhol's work at the Moderna Museet in Stockholm, the quote was rendered as "In the future everybody will be world famous for fifteen minutes." Although the precise wording appears in various forms, it reflects Warhol's observation that mass media and consumer culture could produce fleeting notoriety for ordinary individuals as well as public figures.

Photographer Nat Finkelstein later claimed credit for the expression, stating that he was photographing Warhol in 1966 for a proposed book. A crowd gathered trying to get into the pictures, and Warhol supposedly remarked that everyone wants to be famous, to which Finkelstein replied, "Yeah, for about fifteen minutes, Andy."

== Interpretation ==
German art historian Benjamin H. D. Buchloh suggests that the core tenet of Warhol's aesthetic, being "the systematic invalidation of the hierarchies of representational functions and techniques" of art, corresponds directly to the belief that the "hierarchy of subjects worthy to be represented will someday be abolished;" hence, anybody, and therefore "everybody," can be famous once that hierarchy dissipates, "in the future," and by logical extension of that, "in the future, everybody will be famous," and not merely those individuals worthy of fame.

On the other hand, wide proliferation of the adapted idiom "my fifteen minutes" and its entrance into common parlance have led to a slightly different application, having to do with both the ephemerality of fame in the information age and, more recently, the democratization of media outlets brought about by the advent of the internet. In this formulation, Warhol's quote has been taken to mean: "At the present, because there are so many channels by which an individual might attain fame, albeit not enduring fame, virtually anyone can become famous for a brief period of time."

There is a third and more remote interpretation of the term, as used by an individual who has been legitimately famous or skirted celebrity for a brief period of time, that period of time being their "fifteen minutes."

John Langer suggests that 15 minutes of fame is an enduring concept because it permits everyday activities to become "great effects." Tabloid journalism and the paparazzi have accelerated this trend, turning what may have before been isolated coverage into continuing media coverage even after the initial reason for media interest has passed.

== Derivative phrases ==
In the song "I Can't Read", released by David Bowie's Tin Machine in their 1989 debut album and re-released by Bowie in 1997 for the soundtrack of the movie The Ice Storm, the phrase is used in direct reference to Andy Warhol: "Andy, where's my 15 minutes?" The age of reality television has seen the comment wryly updated as: "In the future, everyone will be obscure for 15 minutes."

The Marilyn Manson song "I Don't Like the Drugs (But the Drugs Like Me)", released on his 1998 album Mechanical Animals, alludes to the term in the line "We're rehabbed and we're ready for our fifteen minutes of shame", as part of the song's theme of unrepentant escapism through drugs.

The British artist Banksy has made a sculpture of a TV that has, written on its screen, "In the future, everyone will be anonymous for 15 minutes," which was later used in the lyrics of Robbie Williams' song "The Actor" from his 2006 album Rudebox.

A more recent adaptation of Warhol's quip, possibly prompted by the rise of online social networking, blogging, and internet celebrity, is the claim that "In the future, everyone will be famous to fifteen people" or, in some renditions, "On the Web, everyone will be famous to fifteen people". This quote, though attributed to David Weinberger, was said to have originated with the Scottish artist Momus.

== See also ==
- Andy Warhol's Fifteen Minutes, talk show on MTV
- 14:59, music album by Sugar Ray referencing the quotation
- Being John Malkovich (1999 film in which people can be inside a famous actor during 15 minutes)
- Big in Japan (phrase)
- Fad
- Famous for being famous
- Internet meme
- It girl
- One-hit wonder
- Real life
- Reality television
- Warhol (fame)
- World famous in New Zealand
