= Benjamin Nagengast =

German educational psychologist

- Born: Mainz, Germany
- Occupation: educational psychologist
- Employer: University of Tübingen

Benjamin Nagengast is a German educational psychologist. He has been Full Professor of Educational Psychology at the University of Tübingen, Germany, since November 2012. He has been vice-director of LEAD Graduate School & Research Network since 2012, and vice-director of Hector Research Institute of Education Sciences and Psychology at Tübingen University since 2014.

== Life ==
Nagengast was born in Mainz and grew up near Frankfurt, Germany. After finishing high school, he studied psychology at Heidelberg University and afterwards social psychology and quantitative psychology at the Ohio State University, Columbus, US. In 2006, he graduated in Psychology and started working as a research assistant at the department of methodology and evaluation research at the University of Jena, Germany. In 2009 he earned his Ph.D. at the University of Jena and moved to Oxford University where he worked at the department of education as a postdoctoral research fellow under the lead of Herbert W. Marsh. In 2011 he became assistant professor at Tübingen University and in 2012 earned his habilitation, with studies focusing on substantive and methodological advances in education sciences and educational psychology.

== Research ==
Nagengast's research focuses on different aspects of education, among them self-concept, communication of values, the effects of educational interventions in classrooms and research methodology. He is reviewer for numerous international scientific journals and editorial board member at the Journal of Educational Psychology (since 2013) and Review of Education (since 2017).

== Publications ==
- Nagengast, Benjamin; Brisson, Brigitte M.; Hulleman, Chris S.; Gaspard, Hanna; Häfner, Isabelle; Trautwein, Ulrich (2018). "Learning More from Educational Intervention Studies: Estimating Complier Average Causal Effects in a Relevance Intervention". The Journal of Experimental Education. 86: 105–123. doi:10.1080/00220973.2017.1289359.
- Nagengast, Benjamin; Trautwein, Ulrich (2015). "The Prospects and Limitations of Latent Variable Models in Educational Psychology". In Corno, Lyn; Anderman, Eric M. (eds.). Handbook of Educational Psychology (3rd ed.). Routledge. doi:10.4324/9781315688244. ISBN 978-1-317-42056-9.
- Gaspard, Hanna; Dicke, Anna-Lena; Flunger, Barbara; Brisson, Brigitte Maria; Häfner, Isabelle; Nagengast, Benjamin; Trautwein, Ulrich (2015). "Fostering adolescents' value beliefs for mathematics with a relevance intervention in the classroom". Developmental Psychology. 51 (9): 1226–1240. doi:10.1037/dev0000028. PMID 26192044.
- Gaspard, Hanna; Dicke, Anna-Lena; Flunger, Barbara; Schreier, Brigitte; Häfner, Isabelle; Trautwein, Ulrich; Nagengast, Benjamin (2015). "More value through greater differentiation: Gender differences in value beliefs about math". Journal of Educational Psychology. 107 (3): 663–677. doi:10.1037/edu0000003.
- Nagengast, Benjamin; Marsh, Herbert W.; Chiorri, Carlo; Hau, Kit-Tai (2014). "Character building or subversive consequences of employment during high school: Causal effects based on propensity score models for categorical treatments". Journal of Educational Psychology. 106 (2): 584–603. doi:10.1037/a0035615.
- Nagengast, Benjamin; Trautwein, Ulrich; Kelava, Augustin; Lüdtke, Oliver (2013). "Synergistic Effects of Expectancy and Value on Homework Engagement: The Case for a Within-Person Perspective". Multivariate Behavioral Research. 48 (3): 428–460. doi:10.1080/00273171.2013.775060. PMID 26741849.
- Marsh, Herbert W.; Nagengast, Benjamin; Morin, Alexandre J. S. (2013). "Measurement invariance of big-five factors over the life span: ESEM tests of gender, age, plasticity, maturity, and la dolce vita effects". Developmental Psychology. 49 (6): 1194–1218. doi:10.1037/a0026913. PMID 22250996.
- Nagengast, Benjamin; Marsh, Herbert W. (2012). "Big fish in little ponds aspire more: Mediation and cross-cultural generalizability of school-average ability effects on self-concept and career aspirations in science". Journal of Educational Psychology. 104 (4): 1033–1053. doi:10.1037/a0027697.
- Nagengast, Benjamin; Marsh, Herbert W.; Scalas, L. Francesca; Xu, Man K.; Hau, Kit-Tai; Trautwein, Ulrich (2011). "Who Took the "×" out of Expectancy-Value Theory?". Psychological Science. 22 (8): 1058–1066. doi:10.1177/0956797611415540. PMID 21750248.
