= Big-fish–little-pond effect =

People feel better about themselves when they are more obviously superior

The big-fish–little-pond effect (BFLPE) is a frame of reference model introduced by Herbert W. Marsh and John W. Parker in 1984. According to the model, individuals compare their own self-concept with their peers and equally capable individuals have higher self-concepts when in a less capable group than in a more capable group. For example, it is better for academic self-concept to be a big fish in a little pond (gifted student in regular reference group) than to be a big fish in a big pond (gifted student in gifted reference group). High achieving and gifted students are just as susceptible to the effect as are less talented students indicating that the effect depends only on the achievement of the reference group. Canadian journalist Malcolm Gladwell publicized the BFLPE in his 2013 book David and Goliath: Underdogs, Misfits, and the Art of Battling Giants.

Higher academic self-concept (ASC) has been shown to predict future performance and achievement. Marsh and O'Mara (2008) demonstrated that academic self-concept among 10th graders was a better predictor of their educational attainments five years after high school graduation than their school grades, standardized test scores, intelligence, and socioeconomic status. Liem, Marsh, Martin, McInerney, and Yeung (2004) showed that positive academic self concepts were associated with better educational outcomes 10 years later—evidence that ASC can have long lasting effects. ASC has also been tied to decision-making in educational settings. It is a predictor of course choice in high schools, major choice in college, and career path after school. In other words, ASC plays a crucial role in both educational outcomes and career aspirations. As such, the question of how self-perceptions develop and change is a genuinely important research question that has serious implications for education systems.

== Theory ==
According to the BFLPE it is better for academic self-concept (ASC) to be a high achiever in a reference group of relative low achievers than it is to be a high achiever in a reference group of high achievers. The BFLPE is thought to be produced by two opposing social comparison effects, assimilation and contrast effects. An assimilation effect is when the individual's self-concept is pulled toward the comparison target, leading to a positive relationship between self-concept and the comparison group. A contrast effect is when the individual's self-concept is pushed away from the comparison target, leading to a negative relationship between self-concept and the comparison group. According to Schwarz and Bless's (1992) inclusion/exclusion model of judgment, assimilation effects occur when the target of comparison is included in the mental representation of the self or viewed as similar to the self. Conversely, contrast effects occur when the target of comparison is excluded from the mental representation of the self or viewed as distinct from the self. Since academic self-concept tends to be negatively related with group achievement, it is assumed that the contrast process is stronger than the assimilation process.

== Class average achievement vs. friend average achievement ==
When forming academic self-concept (ASC), the question arises of classroom friend achievement or class achievement having a larger effect. One hypothesis suggests that friend average achievement has the larger effect. This is known as the friend dominance hypothesis and is consistent with the local dominance effect model. The local dominance effect model posits that people tend to rely on the most local comparison source when there are multiple comparison sources available. Friends are considered a more local source for comparison than classmates, so this indicates that friends should have a larger effect on ASC than classmates.

An alternative hypothesis suggests that class-average achievement has a larger effect on ASC than friend-average achievement. Several studies support this hypothesis. The first showed that individuals showed stronger assimilation effects toward their comparison target when they were part of a group or when they focused on emotional bonding. Huguet et al. (2009) supported the idea that friends may induce smaller contrast effects than classmates in addition to inducing larger assimilation effects than classmates.

The hypothesis that class-average achievement has the larger effect has garnered the most support. Wouters, Colpin, Van Damme, De Laet, and Verschueren (2013) compared the effects of friend-average achievement and class-average achievement on global academic, math, and language self-concept. The study found that the negative effect of class-average achievement was always greater than the negative effect of friend-average achievement. In some cases, the effect of friend average achievement was not even statistically significant. These findings do not support the local dominance effect model.

== Moderators ==
=== Personality factors ===
The BFLPE is moderated by several personality factors. Students who are higher in narcissism or lower in neuroticism experienced a weaker BFLPE on their math self-concept. This suggests that the assimilation process might be stronger for these individuals. Jonkmann (2013) also found that students who are engaged academically experience stronger BFLPE, regardless of whether they were mastery or performance oriented.

=== Motivation ===
Motivation moderates the BFLPE. More highly motivated students typically experience stronger BFLPE. Whether the student's motivation was extrinsic or intrinsic does not matter. The BFLPE is typically more pronounced for students who are more intelligent, who are more highly anxious, who have a cooperative orientation, or who use memorization as a learning strategy. However, the moderating effects of these variables are relatively small.

=== Goal setting ===
Goal setting moderates the BFLPE. Individuals who set higher achievement goals, regardless of the specific nature of the goals, typically experience a stronger BFLPE.

=== Classroom practices ===
Several classroom practices were explored as possible moderators of the BFLPE, including the use of individualized assessment tasks, criterion and self-referenced feedback, and reinforcement of peer identification. The size of the effect of each of these moderators was found to be either small or non-significant across many studies. Chang and Lam (2007) manipulated students so that they were either in direct competition with each other or working together in groups to accomplish a common task. Direct competition with classmates increased the BFLPE while working with other classmates in a group to achieve a goal attenuated the BFLPE.

Another experiment found that the big-fish-little-pond phenomenon has a moderator of the students age. BFLPE is stronger in those in high school and weaker in those who are in middle school and college. The weakest BFLPE are in those who are in elementary or primary school. It is argued that this is because in high school, academic tracking leads to breaking up students into classes ranked on competency. It is also because the students in high school are in a time in their life that they are gaining the most self-awareness.

=== Self-construal ===
Self-construal has been shown to have moderating effects on social comparison. Researchers hypothesized that individuals with highly independent self-construals would experience accentuated contrast effects while individuals with highly interdependent self-construals would experience strengthened assimilation effects. This hypothesis was based on Schwarz and Bless's 1992 inclusion/exclusion model of judgment. The results of the experiment supported Kemmelmeier and Oyserman's hypothesis, demonstrating that self-construal moderates social comparison effects like the BFLPE.

=== Emotional and social integration ===
Emotional and social integration have been shown to moderate the BFLPE. The BFLPE is stronger in individuals who are well integrated into their school but not well integrated with their peers. Such students have high emotional integration and low social integration. This result was replicated in students with mild intellectual disability attending segregated and non-segregated schools.

=== Summary ===
Overall, there are few moderators of the BFLPE, and they mostly have small effect sizes. They have only been shown to alter the strength of the BFLPE, not to reverse its direction. However, moderators of the BFLPE continue to be an active area of research because of their theoretical implications. Identifying moderators may help to discover the psychological mechanism underlying the BFLPE. From a practical perspective, a more thorough understanding of the moderators of the BFLPE could lead to the development and implementation of educational policies that less the negative impacts or enhance the positive effects of the BFLPE.

== Generalizability ==
The BFLPE has been intensely studied across different countries, cultural contexts, and school systems, and it appears to be generalizable across each. In fact, it has been so generalizable that Marjorie Seaton referred to it as a panhuman theory. The BFLPE appears to be generalizable across most age groups too. Roy, Guy, and Valois (2015) showed the BFLPE in a group of 8 to 12-year-old students. Marsh and Hau (2003) found the effect in 26 different countries, thus demonstrating the cross-cultural generalizability of the effect. The countries were: Australia, Austria, Belgium, Brazil, Czech Republic, Denmark, Finland, Germany, Hungary, Iceland, Ireland, Italy, Korea, Latvia, Liechtenstein, Luxembourg, Mexico, Netherlands, New Zealand, Norway, Portugal, Russia, Sweden, Switzerland, United Kingdom, and United States.

Seaton, Marsh, and Craven (2009) expanded this list to 41 countries, including both collectivist and individualist cultures.

The effects of academic self-concept (ASC) on career aspirations appear to generalize across many countries as well. Nagengast and Marsh (2011) showed that science career aspirations were significantly affected by science self-concept in 57 countries. In this study there was also some evidence that the effect might be larger in more economically and socially developed countries.

Researchers initially hypothesized that the BFLPE would be moderated by socioeconomic status. However, SES does not appear to moderate the BFLPE despite students from higher SES backgrounds having slightly higher math self-concepts in a 2010 study conducted by Seaton, Marsh, and Craven. The association found was relatively weak considering the large sample size used in the study. Overall, the study provided evidence that the BFLPE generalizes broadly over different levels of SES and is not moderated by SES. In other words, the BFLPE affects students from all economic backgrounds.

== Limitations ==
Few longitudinal studies have focused on the BFLPE. Becker and Neumann (2016) examined contextual effects on the BFLPE. A group of fourth grade students was studied during their transition into their first year middle school, here defined as fifth grade. The investigators found that the BFLPE was present both in elementary school and middle school. However, one year after the transition to middle school they found that the elementary school BFLPE had diminished and was no longer discernible.

Marsh and O'Mara (2008) demonstrated that once within a stable educational setting, BFLPEs persist or even increase over time. This supports the idea that current academic context has the most influence over academic self-concept (ASC), although past academic environments can have effects on a student's ASC that could last up to a year. Despite potentially lingering effects of past environments, this study was encouraging because it showed that simply changing contexts can drive changes in self-perception.

However, Becker and Neumann (2016) showed that ASC in the senior year of high school had a significant effect on academic adjustment to and success in higher education. This finding highlights the potentially serious affects ASC can have on educational outcomes as those who experience difficulty adjusting to the rigors of higher education are more likely to drop out of school than those who adjust more readily.

== Variations ==
The degree of availability of comparison information influenced the visibility of BFLPEs in different school system structures. The BFLPE was most pronounced in school systems in which students of different ability levels were separated into different school tracks. The German school system is an example. In school systems in which students were grouped by ability within one school, the BFLPE was still present, but increased positive assimilation effects counterbalanced negative contrast effects.

In sports psychology, physical self-concept is considered both a valued outcome variable and a mediating variable that facilitates the attainment of other valued outcomes like physical skills, health-related physical fitness, physical activity, exercise adherence in non-elite settings, and improved performance in elite sports. Marsh, Morin, and Parker (2015) demonstrated that the BFLPE exists with regard to physical concept. The study showed that class-average physical ability in physical fitness was negatively associated with physical self-concept.

== Relative year in school effect ==
The relative year in school effect (RYiSE) is a frame-of-reference effect analogous to the big-fish-little-pond effect. Both the RYiSE and the BFLPE suggest that academic self-concept are formed in relation to those of other students in the school. While the BFLPE demonstrates specifically that class-average achievement is negatively related to academic self-concept (ASC), the RYiSE shows the effects of being one or more years ahead, or one or more years behind same-age classmates. The social comparison theoretical models underlying the BFLPE seem to underlie the RYiSE too. In line with this model the effects of acceleration (starting early or skipping grades) on ASC should be negative while the effects of retention (starting late or repeating grades) on ASC should be positive. Marsh (2016) was the first to provide empirical support for the RYiSE as analogous to the BFLPE, based on the same underlying social comparison theory and frame-of-reference effects. The study showed that the RYiSE seems to be similarly generalizable too, reporting generalizability across 41 countries and across a host of individual student characteristics considered possible moderators of the RYiSE.

== Motivation theory ==
Academic self-concepts (ASCs) are also a factor in motivation theory. Two leading motivation theorists include ASC as one of their principles of motivation. Competence beliefs have been shown to affect the value people assign to tasks. If a person is good at a particular task, he or she is more likely to enjoy it than they would be if they were not competent.

== See also ==
- World famous in New Zealand
- Big in Japan (phrase)
- Island mentality
