= Mermaid Melody Pichi Pichi Pitch =

2002 Japanese manga series

- Pichi Pichi Pitch
- Japanese cover of vol. 1 from the tankōbon version, originally released on March 18, 2003

ぴちぴちピッチ (Pichi Pichi Pitchi)
- Genre: Fantasy; Magical girl Romance
- Manga
- Written by: Michiko Yokote
- Illustrated by: Pink Hanamori
- Published by: Kodansha
- English publisher: NA: Del Rey
- Imprint: Kodansha Comics
- Magazine: Nakayoshi
- Original run: August 2002 – March 2005
- Volumes: 7
- Anime television series

Mermaid Melody Pichi Pichi Pitch
- Directed by: Yoshitaka Fujimoto
- Written by: Junki Takegami
- Music by: Masaki Tsurugi
- Studio: Actas; SynergySP
- Licensed by: NA: ADV Films (dropped); SEA: Top-Insight International
- Original network: TXN (TV Aichi)
- Original run: April 5, 2003 – March 27, 2004
- Episodes: 52
- Anime television series

Mermaid Melody Pichi Pichi Pitch Pure
- Directed by: Yoshitaka Fujimoto
- Written by: Junki Takegami
- Music by: Masaki Tsurugi
- Studio: Actas; SynergySP
- Licensed by: NA: ADV Films (dropped); SEA: Top-Insight International
- Original network: TXN (TV Aichi)
- Original run: April 3, 2004 – December 25, 2004
- Episodes: 39
- Manga

Mermaid Melody Pichi Pichi Pitch: Aqua
- Written by: Pink Hanamori
- Published by: Kodansha
- English publisher: NA: Kodansha USA
- Magazine: Nakayoshi
- Original run: August 3, 2021 – present
- Volumes: 7

Pichi Pichi Pitch (ぴちぴちピッチ, Pichi Pichi Pitchi) (Note: The title is a pun on the Japanese onomatopoeia pichi pichi, the sound for a mermaid's tail movement, and how the characters would have a good pitch when singing.) is a Japanese manga series created and illustrated by Pink Hanamori and written by Michiko Yokote. (Note: Pink Hanamori is credited as the creator of Pichi Pichi Pitch, while Michiko Yokote is credited for writing the story.) It was serialized in the monthly shōjo manga magazine Nakayoshi from August 2002 to March 2005. Thirty-two chapters and two side stories are compiled into seven volumes by Kodansha. The story follows Lucia Nanami, a mermaid princess who must save the oceans by transforming into an idol singer and defeating her foes with her singing voice.

A 91-episode anime adaptation titled Mermaid Melody Pichi Pichi Pitch (マーメイドメロディーぴちぴちピッチ, Māmeido Merodī Pichi Pichi Pitchi) was broadcast on TV Aichi and other TX Network-affiliated networks for two seasons. The first season was broadcast from April 5, 2003, to March 7, 2004, for 52 episodes, while the second, titled Mermaid Melody Pichi Pichi Pitch Pure, was broadcast from April 3, 2004, to December 25, 2004, for 39 episodes. The anime adaptation also included a toy line from Takara and three video game adaptations for the Game Boy Advance.

While the artwork received praise, both the manga and anime adaptation received mixed reviews over the storytelling; however, the anime adaptation received a cult following overseas and saw high viewership ratings among its target demographic. In addition to broadcasts in European and Asian countries, a full English-language dub was produced by ADV Films for North America from 2004 to 2005, but it remains unreleased, as the show was never picked up by television networks.

From 2019 onwards, Mermaid Melody Pichi Pichi Pitch became associated with nostalgia for the Heisei era (1989–2019) and received multiple merchandise collaborations for its 20th anniversary. Renewed public interest led to Hanamori following up with a sequel, Mermaid Melody Pichi Pichi Pitch: Aqua (ぴちぴちピッチ aqua), in 2021.

== Plot ==
Lucia Nanami, the mermaid princess of the North Pacific Ocean, learns that Gackto and his sea demons have invaded the sea world. To stop them, she must locate the six other mermaid princesses and use their pearls to summon the goddess Aqua Regina. Lucia also travels to the human world to retrieve her pearl from Kaito Dōmoto, which she had used to save him from drowning seven years ago. Kaito and Lucia remain in love with each other, but Kaito does not recognize Lucia in her human form, and she cannot directly reveal her true identity to him or else she would turn into bubbles.

Lucia teams up with fellow mermaid princesses Hanon and Rina, transforming with their pearls into idol singers to defeat the sea demons with their singing voices. After multiple encounters with the sea demons, Gackto kidnaps Kaito and reveals that they are twin brothers and descendants of the Panthalassa clan. Lucia and the other mermaid princesses storm his castle to free Kaito and the captured mermaid princesses, to which Kaito realizes Lucia's true identity. Meanwhile, Lucia and her friends learn that Sara, the final mermaid princess, had planned for the oceans' destruction out of anger for feeling abandoned by Taro Mitsuki, their music teacher. The mermaid princesses help Sara reconcile with her feelings and summon Aqua Regina to seal Gackto in the depths of the ocean. However, Sara, realizing Gackto's feelings for her, stays with him.

After returning to the human world, Michel, a fake angel created by the higher angels, steals Kaito's memories as energy for his body. Kaito's growing relationship with Michal Amagi creates tension between Lucia and himself, as Lucia tries to have Kaito remember her. At the same time, Sara notifies Lucia that a new mermaid princess, Seira, will be born and replace her. Instead, Seira's heart is stolen by Michel, preventing her birth. Soon, Kaito regains his memories and rejects Michal's romantic advances, but Michel takes advantage of Michal's loneliness and convinces her to give him her body.

Fully empowered, Michel begins enacting revenge against humans, who he blames for the destruction of Earth. Seira, having felt his emotions from him taking her heart, helps him reconcile with his loneliness of being a fake angel. In his weakened state, Seira is then born, and with Aqua Regina summoned, the mermaid princesses defeat him. Michal is reborn as a baby, while the mermaid princesses move on with their lives. In a concluding side story, Lucia reawakens as the next Aqua Regina.

== Production ==
=== Concept and creation ===
Nakayoshi's editorial department had approached Hanamori about serializing a manga that would market Takara's E-kara karaoke toy to young girls. Hanamori was supervised by a team of three editors (consisting of Kawamoto, Ōzawa, and Zushi) as it would be her first serialized manga. Together, they felt that a magical girl or transforming heroine would be best for the concept. Hanamori originally wanted to draw a manga about animals, but she then suggested mermaids because it matched the singing concept, and the editors agreed it was an appropriate fit for Hanamori's art style. Screenwriter Michiko Yokote was brought on by the editorial department as a scenario writer to create the story. The title, Pichi Pichi Pitch, was created by Ōzawa, who explained it as a pun between pichi pichi, the Japanese onomatopoeia for a mermaid's tail movement, and how the characters would have a good pitch when singing.

As the anime adaptation was broadcast in the middle of the manga's serialization, Hanamori found it difficult to keep up with the amount of work she was getting, such as turning in the final designs of the mermaid princesses' upgraded idol outfits. As she enjoyed the songs from the anime and felt impressed with the lyrics, she asked for permission to include some of the lyrics in the manga, such as "Yume no Sono Saki e", "Beautiful Wish", "Tsubasa o Daite", and "Kibō no Kaneoto (Love Goes On)". Several assistants helped Hanamori work on the manga, one of them being Michiyo Kikuta, the creator of Mamotte! Lollipop.

=== Characters and setting ===
Hanamori felt that she was unable to write characters that did not share anything in common with her, so she based the characters Lucia, Hanon, and Rina partly on her own personality. Lucia's name was provided by Yokote, while Rina's name was provided by Kawamoto. For other characters, Hanamori used her friends as models or gave them personality traits that she felt her friends would like. Hippo was modeled after her chief editor.

Hanamori created Kaito and decided on his first name, while Yokote chose his family name. Hanamori found it difficult to portray Kaito's feelings in a way that would make him seem impressive, but not as predictable. She sought advice from the chief editor on how to depict romance. For the other love interests, one of her editors came up with Taro, while Nagisa and Masahiro were based on advice from her other editors.

For the villains, Hanamori created the Dark Lovers because she wanted to introduce a gothic lolita character, which would become the basis for Yuri. She made Yuri into a love interest for Hippo after her chief editor, the basis for Hippo, wanted a bittersweet love story. For the other three Dark Lovers, they were distinguishable by certain traits, such as sexiness for Maria, comic relief for Eriru, and a standard villain design for Izuru. Izuru's name was based on one of Hanamori's editors, while Eriru is based on Hanamori's older sister, who she describes as a person with "mood swings". For the Black Beauty Sisters, Hanamori wanted to express the "blackness" of anglerfish and the jaggedness of fangs from deep sea fish in a way she found interesting. (Note: Pink Hanamori said the following in her interview: 「デザインはマーメイドと逆に、本来の姿であるオニアンコウの黒さ、深海魚のキバのキザキザ感をカッコよく表現したかったんです。」 ["The design is opposite of the mermaids, the original figures being the blackness of the demon anglerfish, the deep sea fish fangs' jagged feelings are displayed coolly."]) Michal, who appears in the second story arc, was modeled after the human girl who saves the prince in The Little Mermaid and was given frail and delicate personality traits to present her as a foil to Lucia.

== Media ==
=== Manga ===
Pichi Pichi Pitch was serialized in the monthly shōjo manga magazine Nakayoshi from the September 2002 issue released in August 2002, to the April 2005 issue released in March 2003. Totaling 32 chapters, the original story then concluded with two side stories, and they were later compiled in seven bound volumes by Kodansha under the Kodansha Comics imprint. The final volume also included original short stories that Hanamori had drawn from 2001 to 2002 and serialized in Nakayoshi: Become Nude (ヌードになって, Nūdo ni natte), Moonlight Goddess Diana (MOONLIGHT GODDESSディアナ), and Cherry Blossom (チェリー ブロッサム, Cherī burossamu).

In October 2005, Del Rey Manga acquired the license to distribute the manga in English in North America, under the title Pichi Pichi Pitch: Mermaid Melody. Translated by William Flanagan, the English version of Pichi Pichi Pitch was published from April 2006 to October 2007.

A sequel manga written and illustrated by Hanamori, titled Mermaid Melody Pichi Pichi Pitch: Aqua, began serialization in the September issue Nakayoshi on August 3, 2021. The editorial department had suggested for Hanamori to create the sequel based on public interest stemming from an unofficial Pichi Pichi Pitch fan event that she and the anime voice cast organized in 2019. Whereas Michiko Yokote wrote the story for Pichi Pichi Pitch, Hanamori took sole authorship of Mermaid Melody Pichi Pichi Pitch: Aqua. She decided to make Lucia's daughter as the main character, since she wanted to write a story featuring a mother-daughter dynamic. To promote the release of the first volume of Aqua, the original Pichi Pichi Pitch manga was reprinted into shinsōban editions in 2022. On March 31, 2026, Kodansha USA announced that they would be publishing Aqua digitally in English.

==== Tankōbon edition ====
No.	Original release date	Original ISBN	English release date	English ISBN
1	March 18, 2003	978-4-063640-151	April 25, 2006	978-0-3454-9196-1
2	August 1, 2003	978-4-063640-274	July 25, 2006	978-0-3454-9197-8
3	December 1, 2003	978-4-063640-373	October 31, 2006	978-0-3454-9198-5
4	March 26, 2004	978-4-063640-458	January 30, 2007	978-0-3454-9199-2
5	September 3, 2004	978-4-063640-588	May 1, 2007	978-0-3454-9200-5
6	March 4, 2005	978-4-063640-700	July 31, 2007	978-0-3454-9201-2
7	April 25, 2005	978-4-063640-786	October 30, 2007	978-0-3454-9202-9

==== Shinsōban edition ====
No.	Japanese release date	Japanese ISBN
1	January 13, 2022	978-4-065266-274
2	January 13, 2022	978-4-065266-267
3	February 10, 2022	978-4-065269-848

==== Pichi Pichi Pitch: Aqua ====
No.	Original release date	Original ISBN	English release date	English ISBN
1	January 13, 2022	978-4-065266-298	June 6, 2023	978-1-6849-1821-8
2	September 13, 2022	978-4-065289-433	July 4, 2023	978-1-6849-1822-5
3	June 13, 2023	978-4-065318-331	January 16, 2024	979-8-8893-3257-2
4	February 13, 2024	978-4-065346-389	October 24, 2024	979-8-8893-3535-1
5	October 11, 2024	978-4-065371-992	May 27, 2025	979-8-8947-8463-2
6	September 12, 2025	978-4-065407-448	TBA	—
7	April 13, 2026	978-4-065432-259	TBA	—

=== Anime ===
In 2003, an anime adaptation titled Mermaid Melody Pichi Pichi Pitch was produced by TV Aichi, We've, and Tokyu Agency. The series was animated by Actas and Synergy Japan. The anime adaptation was directed by Yoshitaka Fujimoto and written by Junki Takegami, with character designs provided by Kazuaki Makida. The music was composed by Masaki Tsurugi, with Katsunori Shimizu in charge of music direction. The anime adaptation was broadcast on TV Aichi and other TX Network-affiliated networks for two seasons. The first season was broadcast from April 5, 2003, to March 27, 2004, for a total of 52 episodes. Season 2, titled Mermaid Melody Pichi Pichi Pitch Pure, was broadcast from April 3, 2004, to December 25, 2004, for 39 episodes.

The anime adaptation stars the voices of Asumi Nakada (credited as Asumi Nakata) (Note: Asumi Nakada was originally credited as Asumi Nakata, an alternate reading of her family name 中田, from the early 1990s to mid 2000s.) as Lucia, Hitomi Terakado as Hanon, and Mayumi Asano as Rina. The casting process was managed by the animation and recording studios without the input from Hanamori and her editors. Nakata and Terakado were middle school students at the time, with it being their first voice acting role. Hanamori gave minimal creative input, as she considered the anime as a separate work from the manga and wanted to enjoy the anime as a "viewer". However, she stated in 2022 that she was particular about the kind of voice that Kaito would have. The character Gackto was also renamed Gaito in the anime adaptation.

The opening theme songs for the first season are performed by Miyuki Kanbe, consisting of "Taiyō no Rakuen (Promised Land)" (太陽の楽園 ~Promised Land~) episodes 1–28 and "Rainbow Notes" for episodes 29–52. The ending theme songs are "Daiji na Takarabako" (大事な宝箱) by Asumi Nakata for episodes 1–28 and "Sekai de Ichiban Hayaku Asa ga kuru Basho" (世界で一番早く朝が来る場所) by Nakata, Hitomi Terakado, and Mayumi Asano for episodes 29–52. For Pure, the opening theme is "Before the Moment" by Eri Kitamura and the ending theme song is "Ai no Ondo" (愛の温度°C) by Nakata, Terakado, and Asano.

In June 2004, ADV Films acquired the license to the anime for an English-language release in North America. Despite that all episodes and songs have been dubbed, ADV Films later announced in June 2005 that they had dropped the license due to being unable to secure a television broadcasting deal, which was necessary for it to be "financially viable" as Mermaid Melody Pichi Pichi Pitch was considered a "big franchise". The networks had declined to offer a television broadcasting deal due to being unable to determine an appropriate market demographic for the show. Another English-language dub of both seasons was produced by Top-Insight International for Malaysia and other Southeast Asian countries.

=== Merchandise ===
To coincide with the anime adaptation, Takara produced toys based on the characters and magical items seen in the show. Takara also produced two special versions of their E-kara karaoke toy featuring the characters' microphones, known as the E-Pitch. Asumi Nakata, who voiced Lucia in the anime, starred in the toy and E-Pitch commercials.

=== Video games ===
Between 2003 and 2004, Konami produced three licensed video games based on the anime adaptation for the Game Boy Advance. In addition, Pichi Pichi Pitch was featured in the Nintendo DS game Nakayoshi All Stars: Mezase Gakuen Idol, a game featuring characters from series printed in the magazine Nakayoshi.

List of Mermaid Melody Pichi Pichi Pitch games
Game	Details
Mermaid Melody Pichi Pichi Pitch Original release date: JP: October 9, 2003	Release years by system: 2003—Game Boy Advance
Mermaid Melody Pichi Pichi Pitch Original release date: JP: October 9, 2003	Notes: Developed and published by Konami; Rhythm game using a system similar to Konami's other rhythm game titles, such as Beatmania and Dance Dance Revolution, featuring songs from the anime series; Includes a multiplayer option for up to 3 players
Mermaid Melody Pichi Pichi Pitch: Pichi Pichi Party Original release date: JP: December 18, 2003	Release years by system: 2003—Game Boy Advance
Mermaid Melody Pichi Pichi Pitch: Pichi Pichi Party Original release date: JP: December 18, 2003	Notes: Developed and published by Konami; Party video game which was compared to Mario Party by Animefringe
Mermaid Melody Pichi Pichi Pitch: Pichi Pichitto Live Start! Original release date: JP: March 18, 2004	Release years by system: 2004—Game Boy Advance
Mermaid Melody Pichi Pichi Pitch: Pichi Pichitto Live Start! Original release date: JP: March 18, 2004	Notes: Developed and published by Konami; Rhythm game that uses mechanics similar to Dance Dance Revolution; Includes a story mode that goes up to episode 39 of Mermaid Melody Pichi Pichi Pitch and four unlockable mini games; Includes a multiplayer option for up to 2 players

== Reception ==
=== Critical reception ===
Through a 2008 report published in the School Library Journal, Pichi Pichi Pitch ranked in 24th place for all ages and in 11th place for ages 13–18 for the top circulated books in 41 libraries within the United States. Pichi Pichi Pitch received mixed reception overall from reviewers. Hanamori's artwork received general praise, with Dan Polley of Manga Life describing it as "delicate and curvy". However, the story was criticized, with Publishers Weekly describing the first volume of Pichi Pichi Pitch as an "industrial-strength shōjo" with "cardboard villains" and a "recycled love story". For the second volume, Melissa Harper of Anime News Network stated that, for older readers, the story was childish, "barely coherent", and confusing due to the gaps in the narrative. Robert Harris of Mania.com scored all of its volumes Cs and below, with the final volume ranking an F−, concluding that the characters and Hanamori's storytelling style were "offensively stupid". In comparison, Pichi Pichi Pitch: Aqua, the sequel, Rebecca Silverman of Anime News Network criticized the artwork and logical issues with the plot.

Mermaid Melody Pichi Pichi Pitch, the anime adaptation, also received mixed reviews. Khan Ridwan of Animefringe and Jennifer Berman of THEM Anime Reviews drew comparisons to Cardcaptor Sakura and Sailor Moon, while stating that the show offered "nothing new" for the shōjo and magical girl genres. Another review by Melissa Sterneberg of THEM Anime Reviews was more favorable, praising the voice cast and their singing abilities. Likewise, fan response was more positive. The anime adaptation was described by Animefringe to have a cult following in 2004, particularly in Germany, through fansubs distributed on the Internet and the game adaptations on the Game Boy Advance.

When Mermaid Melody Pichi Pichi Pitch was broadcast in several countries worldwide, it achieved high viewership within its target demographic. The December 2009 issue of Monthly Business ASCII reported that Mermaid Melody Pichi Pichi Pitch was popular among elementary school girls in Taiwan and more than 1 million VCDs were consecutively sold in the country across four volumes, with the first volume topping convenience store online sales rankings for one month. In 2009, the first season also ranked among 20 cable programs for 10 consecutive months in Portugal. In October 2011, 59.5% of the target demographic watched the show's premiere in Greece.

=== Legacy ===
In 2019, the voice cast from the anime adaptation and Hanamori held an unofficial fan meeting to celebrate the anime's 15th anniversary, which sold out. The public interest from the event encouraged the editorial department to ask Hanamori to create Mermaid Melody Pichi Pichi Pitch: Aqua, the manga's sequel. In the following years, this led to a revival of Pichi Pichi Pitch, and the anime was rebroadcast on the streaming service Locipo for its 20th anniversary. This followed with multiple collaboration character cafés, pop-up shops, and other merchandise. Pichi Pichi Pitch became associated with nostalgia for the Heisei era (1989–2019), Premium Bandai created replicas of the E-Pitch and other magical items seen in Mermaid Melody Pichi Pichi Pitch as part of their Special Memorize line, a magical girl toy series for adult collectors.
