= Someday (Sugar Ray song) =

1999 single by Sugar Ray

Single by Sugar Ray

from the album 14:59
- Released: September 7, 1999
- Genre: Pop rock; alternative rock
- Length: 4:02
- Label: Atlantic; Lava
- Songwriters: Sugar Ray; David Kahne
- Producer: David Kahne

Sugar Ray singles chronology
"Falls Apart" (1999)	"Someday" (1999)	"When It's Over" (2001)

Music video
- "Someday" on YouTube

"Someday" is a song by American rock band Sugar Ray. First serviced to American radio in June 1999, the song was released on September 7, 1999, as the second US single and third single overall from the band's third album, 14:59 (1999). The song reached number seven on both the US Billboard Hot 100 and Billboard Modern Rock Tracks charts (giving Sugar Ray their last top-10 single on both listings), number four on Canada's RPM 100 Hit Tracks chart, and number 25 in New Zealand.

== Music video ==
Sugar Ray performing the song on a beach in the music video

The music video for the song is in black-and-white and is slowed down. The first half features the band playing on a beach and wading in the water. In the second half, the band performs in a bar. Joseph Kahn directed the video.

== Track listings ==
US CD single

1. "Someday" (album version)
2. "Every Morning" (live acoustic version)
3. "Someday" (live acoustic version)

UK CD and cassette single

1. "Someday" (album version) – 4:02
2. "Someday" (live acoustic version) – 3:42
3. "Every Morning" (live acoustic version) – 3:16

German maxi-CD single

1. "Someday" (album version)
2. "Fly" (featuring Super Cat)
3. "Mean Machine"

== Charts ==
=== Weekly charts ===
Chart (1999)	Peak position
Australia (ARIA)	78
Canada Top Singles (RPM)	4
Canada Adult Contemporary (RPM)	3
Canada CHR (Nielsen BDS)	6
Germany (GfK)	87
New Zealand (Recorded Music NZ)	25
Scottish Singles Sales (Official Charts)	93
UK Singles (Official Charts)	88
US Billboard Hot 100	7
US Adult Alternative Airplay (Billboard)	3
US Adult Contemporary (Billboard)	29
US Adult Pop Airplay (Billboard)	3
US Alternative Airplay (Billboard)	7
US Pop Airplay (Billboard)	2

=== Year-end charts ===
Chart (1999)	Position
Brazil (Crowley)	39
Canada Top Singles (RPM)	16
Canada Adult Contemporary (RPM)	32
US Billboard Hot 100	30
US Adult Top 40 (Billboard)	15
US Mainstream Top 40 (Billboard)	12
US Modern Rock Tracks (Billboard)	35
US Triple-A (Billboard)	20

== Release history ==
Region	Date	Format(s)	Label(s)	Ref.
United States	June 1, 1999	Contemporary hit radio	Atlantic; Lava	
United States	September 7, 1999	CD	Atlantic; Lava	
United Kingdom	October 4, 1999	CD; cassette	Atlantic; Lava	
