= Range–frequency theory =

Theory in cognitive psychology

The range–frequency compromise in judgment is a theory in cognitive psychology developed by Allen Parducci in the mid-1960s. Range–frequency is descriptive of how judgments reflect a compromise between a range principle that assigns each category to an equal subrange of contextual stimuli and a frequency principle that assigns each of the categories to the same number of contextual stimuli. Each judgment is a weighted average of what it would have been judged were it to follow just the range or just the frequency principle. A crucial deduction from the theory is that the mean of all judgments is proportionate to the skew of the frequency distribution of the context under which the judgment is made, assuming that the context is an unbiased representation of the stimuli that are judged.

== The range principle ==
The range principle asserts that equal segments of the scale of judgment are assigned to equal segments of the contextual range. Thus, the range of stimuli corresponds to successive category ratings that are equally spaced subranges. The judgment of any given stimulus should be determined in accordance with the two endpoints of the contextual range.

== The frequency principle ==
What the frequency principle explains is the effect of varying the distribution of contextual values. An example will help illustrate the point. If judgments were restricted to just four categories, and if fewer than one-fourth of all contextual representations are below a given stimulus, then that stimulus would elicit the bottom category.

== The range–frequency compromise ==
When contextual representations are distributed evenly, both the range and frequency principles entail the same judgments. It is only when the two principles differ in that the stimuli are spaced unevenly, or presented with unequal frequencies, that each judgment falls between what it would have been as predicted solely from the range or solely from the frequency principle. The present approach developed from experiments that contradicted Helson's theory of adaptation.

The present approach relates a human judgment to the range and relative frequencies of contextual stimuli, where happiness is a direct proportion of the stockpile of events toward the upper endpoints of the hedonic contexts in which they are experienced, regardless of what the absolute values of these endpoints are. Two tendencies of judgment are postulated with range frequency: (a) one must divide the range of stimuli into proportionate subranges, with each category of judgment covering a fixed proportion of the range and (b) one must use the categories of judgment with proportionate frequencies, each category being used for a fixed proportion of the total number of judgments. The psychological range is the difference between the two extreme values of the stimuli that form the psychological context for judgment. The frequency principle implies that the judgments are affected by the stimulus frequencies. For illustrative purposes, let us assume that our psychological range consists of just two categories, “large” and “small”. If the larger stimuli were presented more frequently than the smaller ones, the “large” stimuli would have to correspond to a narrower subrange, causing the range and frequency principles to conflict. Whenever the stimuli are presented with varying frequencies, there must be a compromise between the two postulated tendencies of judgment given that differences in frequencies produce category widths that differ from those produced by a proportionate-subrange tendency. Differences in the distribution of the stimuli presented for judgment constituted the major independent variable in Parducci's range–frequency theory (1963), with these variations or differences in stimuli distribution being characterized in terms of three measures of central tendency—the midpoint, median, and mean.

Range–frequency theory postulates that the actual judgments reflect a compromise between these two principles. Mathematically, the subjective judgment J of stimulus i in context k is conceived as a compromise between the range, R, and the frequency, F, principles, in which the weighting parameter, w, is a value between zero and one: Jik = (w)*Rik + (1-w)*Fik

The relative weighting of range and frequency values has been found to be roughly equal, that is to say that w is roughly .5. A number of experiments have shown that w can either be increased or reduced. The key takeaway is that the range weighting can be greater when stimuli are shown in a manner that emphasizes their relationship to the endpoints of the contextual set, and "less when it is the relative frequencies or spacings of stimuli that are emphasized" (see e.g., Parducci & Marshall, 1961; Parducci & Wedell, 1986, Experiment 4C).

This equation relates the judgment of a stimulus to the context in which that judgment is made. Because a judgment is assumed to be a subjective experience that is available to the subject's introspection but not to the public, the range and frequency trade-off suggests that this internal judgment by the subject can be transformed linearly for an explicit public expression expressed as a category rating. Happiness is conceived as a psychological state, according to Parducci, that is a "theoretical summation or average across many momentary psychological states, each with a certain degree of pleasure or pain". An implication from the contextual theory of happiness is that because certain premises provide us with immediate pleasure, we often infer that they heighten our long-term happiness incorrectly. Addictive drugs might produce temporary, pleasant highs, but their long-term effects are much less pleasant. It is not how much money one accrues, but rather how our earnings reflect against our prior earnings and how the earnings of our peers compare to ours. Pleasure will be greater than pain in the earnings domain in as much as our monetary gains are high relative to our comparison domains.

== From judgments to ratings ==
The transformation of an internal judgment into an overt category rating that expresses the judgment is the first concern for testing range–frequency theory. This judgment is an internal, subjective experience that is observable to our own introspection but not to the outside world. The internal judgments are attributes of a stimulus (i.e., its pleasantness). One's characterizations of a stimulus' pleasantness merits such category ratings as wonderful, unpleasant, or slightly disappointing. As Parducci (1995) notes: "The fact that subjects permitted to generate their own categories follow the same principles of judgment as do subjects restricted to a prescribed set of categories encourages application of range-frequency theory to everyday judgments outside the laboratory".

== The mean of all judgments ==
The mean of all the judgments is a measure that most closely matches a Utilitarian definition of happiness, where the mean of all the judgments is equal to the mean of all of the range and frequency values, weighted respectively by w and (1-w).

Mean of all judgments = w(Mean – Midpoint)/Range,

where the mean, midpoint, and range on the right side of the equation refer to the distribution of stimulus values and the left side of the equation is expressed on a unitary scale from −0.5 to +0.5. As Parducci (1995, p. 79) writes: "This crucial deduction shows that the mean of all judgments for a particular context is directly proportional to the difference between the mean and midpoint of that context, divided by its range: the more negatively skewed the distribution of contextual stimuli, the greater the overall mean of the judgments of these stimuli.".

== Psychophysical experiments ==
Observers are instructed to report subjectively on simply physical stimuli in psychophysical experiments. The observer is often asked to report how pleasant, or loud, or large any given physical stimulus is. For something as taking a drink of lemonade, the pleasantness of the drink is affected by an assortment of factors, including: the temperature of the drink, the drinkers' state of thirst, the amount of sugar, or the amount of lemon (to name but a few).

In another set of experiments (Marsh & Parducci 1978), actual outcomes included wins of up to $200 and losses no larger than $100 in a pseudogambling game. Ratings ranged from Very, Very Satisfying for the largest win to Moderately Dissatisfying for the largest loss. It seemed as if subjects spoke to themselves and considered, "If one can sometimes win as much as $200, it could also have been set up to include a $200 loss; against this possibility, a $100 loss is not so bad".

== Testing range–frequency theory ==
Frequency values are calculated first and without reference to experimental data. Imagine that 48 numbers were presented on the same page in order to get ratings of numerical magnitude along six category scales. If just the frequency principle was followed, these 48 numbers would be divided equally amongst the six available categories. Suppose, however, that stimuli are presented with varying frequencies. In research judging the sizes of squares (where 1 = very small, 5 = very large), suppose that a positively skewed stimulus set emerges such that in a block of 25 square presentations, 10 are judged as category 1, 7 as category 2, 4 as category 3, 2 as category 4 and 2 as category 5 rank. As Parducci (1995, p. 83) delineates: "one half of the 10 presentations of the smallest size are rated 1, the other half, 2 – yielding a mean rating of 1.5. For the second size, five of its seven presentations are rated 3, the other two, 4 – for a mean rating of [(5X3) + (2X4)]/7 = 3.29. For the third size, three of its four presentations are rated 4, the fourth, 5 – for a mean rating of [(3X4) + (1X5)]/4 = 4.25. Both presentations of each of the two largest sizes are rated 5."

== Calculating range values ==
Consider a set of numbers ranging from 100 to 1,000, rated with six categories. Each category covers a subrange of 150 (1,000 – 100)/6. All numbers between 100 and 250 must be rated using the first category, 1 – very small; the second category, 2 – small, must be assigned the numbers 250 through 400; and so on and so forth. With actual perceptual stimuli, however, the subranges cannot be assumed beforehand. For certain psychophysical dimensions, this scaling has often been assumed to be logarithmic. For other psychophysical dimensions, however, the scaling of subranges can be quasilogarithmic and for others, it is almost linear (e.g. for judgments of the sizes of squares, see Haubensak, 1982).
