= 14:59 =

Studio album by Sugar Ray
- Released: January 12, 1999
- Recorded: 1998
- Studios: Swinghouse Studios (Hollywood, California); Sunset Sound Studios (Hollywood, California); Ocean Way Studios (Hollywood, California); Studio 56 (Hollywood, California)
- Genres: Alternative rock; pop rock
- Length: 40:30
- Labels: Atlantic; Lava
- Producers: David Kahne, except for "Abracadabra" which was produced by Ralph Sall

Sugar Ray chronology
Floored (1997)	14:59 (1999)	Sugar Ray (2001)

Singles from 14:59
- 1. "Every Morning" Released: January 25, 1999; 2. "Falls Apart" Released: May 12, 1999; 3. "Someday" Released: September 7, 1999

14:59 is the third studio album by American rock band Sugar Ray, released on January 12, 1999. The album shows the band moving into a more mainstream sound, due to the success of their single "Fly" off their prior album Floored, and its title self-deprecatingly references the "15 minutes of fame" critics claimed the band was riding on. It entered the top 20 on the Billboard 200, peaking at number 17 and being certified triple-platinum by the RIAA.

== Background ==
During the writing sessions for their second album Floored, Sugar Ray wrote a much poppier track, the reggae ballad "Fly". The track's massive surprise success inspired the band to further pursue softer sounds on their following album, 14:59. McGrath admitted "Fly" was "the blueprint now for experimentation".

== Music and lyrics ==
14:59 is described as an alternative rock and pop rock album. It features elements of styles such as acoustic pop, Caribbean music, circus music, death metal, funk, electronica, hip hop, psychedelia, new wave, punk rock, reggae and ska. The album has been labelled as being "all over the place", with drummer Stan Frazier saying in a 1999 interview, "everybody is used to hearing a band, and they do just one type of song. We couldn't do that here. Everybody in this band contributes and everybody has their own tastes, so, of course, you're going to end up with all sorts of songs."

"Aim for Me" is a fast punk rock track in the vein of The Clash or Green Day, while "Falls Apart" and "Personal Space Invader" take influence from the Police's Synchronicity and new wave band Men Without Hats. "Personal Space Invader" has been described as being a new wave song, with the band having previously experimented with this style on the track "Stand and Deliver" from Floored, which was a cover of the 1981 song by Adam and the Ants. "Burning Dog" has a ska punk and skate punk-influenced sound similar to the Offspring, and has also been described as having elements of funk rock/funk metal, like with some of the songs from the band's first two records. "Live & Direct" features elements of Caribbean music and has guest vocals from rapper KRS-One. Frazier said KRS-One only became a fan of Sugar Ray after hearing "Fly", which featured Super Cat, saying "he thought it was so cool that Super Cat worked with four white guys from Newport Beach". Originally, the band didn't have the time to come up with a song that would feature KRS-One, but they eventually added him to "Live & Direct" since they thought the song "needed an extra ingredient". "Glory" has been described as an alternative metal song, and is reminiscent of the metallic songs from the band's first two records. "Every Morning" has been called an acoustic pop number, and along with the light ballads "Even Though", "Someday" and "Ode to the Lonely Hearted" is reminiscent of their previous soft hit single "Fly". "Someday" also incorporates elements of psychedelia, while "Even Though" has elements of electronic music. "Abracadabra" is a cover of a 1981 song by blues rock act the Steve Miller Band.

The album features two comedic songs titled "New Direction" as album openers and closers, the former being in the vein of death metal and the latter a circus music instrumental. In a July 1997 interview with MTV, McGrath had joked about how the band might write a circus/polka song for their third album, in reference to how they had previously experimented with soft reggae music on Floored and soft R&B music on Lemonade and Brownies. The death metal opening track was written with the intention of scaring the new listeners Sugar Ray had attracted on the strength of "Fly", and also parodies how the band were expected to go in a more accessible direction on this album. Regarding the opening track, McGrath said in 2015, "back then, places like Tower Records had listening stations where you could preview the album before you bought it. I'm still in like super-prankster mode, going 'wouldn't it be funny if the first song on our album was a death-metal song?' so the first song you heard on 14:59 was 'New Direction,' a joke at our expense and possibly our pocketbook."

Despite having a different overall sound than previous albums, Sheppard noted that the band still had the same lighthearted approach to music as before, saying: "we're not begging to be taken seriously. We'd feel stupid. We've been doing interviews for years saying we don't take ourselves seriously. It would be lame for us to say, 'Now we are'. We're still pranksters, just the lyrical content is more serious." The single "Falls Apart" lyrically revolves around a troubled teenage girl, with McGrath saying in 1999 "high school wasn't the best for everybody, so this follows the life of a girl in high school and the ups and downs of what you can go through." He added that "I think it's more about me, but I'm scared to talk about myself so I put it in the third-person [about a] girl." Drummer Stan Frazier, who co-wrote the single "Someday", said it was about how his girlfriend had remained faithful to him while he was on the road. He said, "I'm tempted to go with other women. And dogs. And men. And she has remained faithful. She was always so perfect and I was this f---ing guilty asshole."

== Touring and promotion ==
Sugar Ray toured throughout 1999 and 2000 to support the album. Their first show of 1999 was on January 22, at the Snow Summit Resort in Big Bear Lake, California. This show was as part of MTV's "Snowed In 1999". From February 1999 to March 1999, they toured the United States with hip hop musician Everlast and the rap rock band 2 Skinnee J's. The following month, they did an MTV-sponsored "Campus Invasion" tour with hip hop group Run-DMC and the industrial metal band Orgy. Sugar Ray then did their first tour of Japan in May 1999, and played at a string of summer festivals in the United States, before cancelling a scheduled appearance at Woodstock '99. Regarding their cancelled appearance at Woodstock '99, McGrath said in 2016, "my throat gave away. My doctor goes, 'You either finish your tour or you go to Woodstock.' I went, 'Let's finish the tour.'". After cancelling their appearance at Woodstock '99, they toured the United States with Fastball and The Goo-Goo Dolls, with this tour lasting between July 1999 and August 1999. On October 28, 1999, Sugar Ray performed at the inaugural WB Music Awards in Las Vegas, which featured David Bowie, Garth Brooks, Faith Hill, Kid Rock, *NSYNC and Smash Mouth. At the beginning of 2000, they did their first tour of Australia and New Zealand. For their shows in Australia, they were supported by Live and local band Rumanastone. While in Australia, McGrath and Sheppard guest programmed the music video show Rage, where they picked videos from 311, The Rolling Stones, A, Oasis, Bad Brains, The Jam, Bijou Phillips, Finley Quaye and Bob Marley. Later that year, Sugar Ray played one-off shows in Malaysia and the Pacific island of Guam. Artists that Sugar Ray shared bills with during the touring cycle include 311, Barenaked Ladies, Blondie, Britney Spears, Christina Aguilera, Edwin McCain, Imperial Teen, Jessica Simpson, Lou Bega, Luscious Jackson, Mandy Moore, Melissa Etheridge, Natalie Merchant, Save Ferris and Smash Mouth. The band still continued to play some of their more metal-influenced songs from Floored and Lemonade and Brownies, and would continue to do so on later tours.

In 2000, they collaborated with hip hop group Tha Alkaholiks to create a new version of their song "Make Room", from 1993's 21 & Over. This was for the Loud Rocks album, which featured other collaborations between hip hop artists and rock/metal bands. DJ Homicide had briefly been a member of Tha Alkaholiks in the early 1990s, prior to joining Sugar Ray. In 2000, Sugar Ray also recorded a cover of the 1990 song "Spinning Away", by progressive rock artists Brian Eno and John Cale, with this cover appearing in the Leonardo DiCaprio film The Beach. Later in 2000, Sugar Ray and Rosie O'Donnell did a cover of the Christmas song "Silver Bells", which appeared on her Christmas album Another Rosie Christmas.

In October 1998, three months before 14:59's release, Sugar Ray's cover of "Abracadabra" was included on Sabrina the Teenage Witch: The Album. which was a soundtrack album for the WB series of the same name. In July 1998, the 14:59 song "Burning Dog" had also appeared on the soundtrack for the Warner Bros. film The Avengers, with the soundtrack album being released by the band's label Atlantic. The version of "Burning Dog" that appears on The Avengers soundtrack has more of a techno influence than the 14:59 version, and is titled "Burnin' Dog (Don't Pet A)". A remixed version of Sugar Ray's "Abracadabra" cover appeared in the 2002 film Clockstoppers, in addition to being included on that film's soundtrack album. The song "Glory" was used in the 1999 film American Pie, and featured on the soundtrack album. It was later featured in the 2001 film Max Keeble's Big Move. In 1999, "Falls Apart" was featured in the WB series Charmed, while "Someday" appeared in the WB series Roswell that same year. "Someday" was also used in the CBS series Cold Case in 2008. In 2000, "Every Morning" was used for a Snickers chocolate bar commercial in Australia, and in later years went on to appear in the television shows Cruel Summer, Family Guy, Fresh Off the Boat and Las Vegas, in addition to appearing in the 2007 German television movie 29... and still a Virgin.

== Reception ==
Professional ratings
Review scores
Source	Rating
AllMusic	4/5 stars
Entertainment Weekly	C+
The Guardian	3/5 stars
The Independent	2/5 stars
Los Angeles Times	3/4 stars
NME	3.5/5 stars
Q	4/5 stars
Rolling Stone	3.5/5 stars
The Rolling Stone Album Guide	3.5/5 stars
Spin	5/10

The album was generally well received by critics. Paul Pearson of AllMusic wrote, "Their third album showed an alarming overhaul in their approach...from their metal shellac toward a calmer, melodious pastiche of songs. and concluded that 14:59 has such catchiness and charm that it's a guilty pleasure of high order, and a bigger step than one might have expected from Sugar Ray." NME's referred to the album as a "hellishly difficult record to hate...Not that this is especially inspired stuff, but, if you wanted a soundtrack for the kind of sun-kissed pool-party the sleeve depicts, 14:59 is maybe as good as you could get today." Rolling Stone praised the album for its diversity and for not sticking too closely to the sound of "Fly" stating that the band instead "...go[es] off the deep end with gorgeous psychedelic guitar hooks and drum loops, and Mark McGrath's wise-guy futon talk... everything they play is shaped by the cut-and-paste aesthetic of the sampler." Robert Christgau picked out the album's song, "Every Morning", as a choice cut.

David Browne of Entertainment Weekly was less positive and stated: "It's genuinely hard to hate Sugar Ray; [...] Still, listening to '14:59' is a somewhat sad, depressing experience. [...] The album is the sound of a band resigned to the possibility that they may be one-hit wunderkinds and that the 2 million fans who bought their last album may have moved on to Barenaked Ladies."

== Track listing ==
All tracks are written by Sugar Ray, except where noted.

No.	Title	Writer(s)	Length
1.	"New Direction"		0:48
2.	"Every Morning"	Sugar Ray; David Kahne (add.); Richard Bean (add.); Abel Zarate (add.); Pablo Tellez (add.)	3:39
3.	"Falls Apart"	Sugar Ray; Kahne (add.)	4:15
4.	"Personal Space Invader"	Sugar Ray; Kahne (add.)	3:38
5.	"Live & Direct" (featuring KRS-One)	Sugar Ray; Kahne (add.)	4:34
6.	"Someday"	Sugar Ray; Kahne (add.)	4:02
7.	"Aim for Me"		2:20
8.	"Ode to the Lonely Hearted"	Nick Sopkovich; Sugar Ray (arr.); Kahne (arr.)	3:12
9.	"Burning Dog"		3:01
10.	"Even Though"		2:35
11.	"Abracadabra" (Steve Miller Band cover)	Steve Miller	3:42
12.	"Glory"		3:26
13.	"New Direction"		1:18
Total length:			40:37

Sample credits

- "Live & Direct" contains a sample of "Remix for P Is Free", written by Lawrence Parker and Scott La Rock, as performed by Boogie Down Productions.

Notes Sugar Ray sold a different version of the 14:59 album to audiences that attended their live tour. This album included 5 tracks not found on the retail version. These tracks are:

- The hit "Fly" from their previous Floored album
- The original demo recording of "Aim for Me"
- A live acoustic version of "Every Morning"
- The radio edit of "Falls Apart"
- "Rivers", a song written in the style of and in tribute to Weezer frontman Rivers Cuomo

== Personnel ==
Sugar Ray

- Mark McGrath – lead vocals, rhythm guitar
- Rodney Sheppard – lead guitar, backing vocals
- Murphy Karges – bass, guitar, backing vocals
- Stan Frazier – drums, percussion, guitar, programming, backing vocals, co-lead vocals on "Someday"
- Craig "DJ Homicide" Bullock – turntables, samples, programming, keyboards, backing vocals

Technical personnel

- David Kahne – producer (all except 11), programming, mixing, engineer, mastering
- Ralph Sall – producer (11)
- John Travis – mixing, engineer
- Steve Gallagher – engineer

== Charts ==
=== Weekly charts ===
Chart (1999–2000)	Peak position
Australian Albums (ARIA)	19
Austrian Albums (Ö3 Austria)	24
German Albums (Offizielle Top 100)	88
New Zealand Albums (RMNZ)	35
Singaporean Albums (SPVA)	1
UK Albums (Official Charts)	60
US Billboard 200	17

=== Year-end charts ===
Chart (1999)	Position
US Billboard 200	37

== Certifications ==
Region	Certification	Certified units/sales
Australia (ARIA)	Gold	35,000^{^}
United States (RIAA)	3× Platinum	3,000,000^{^}
^{^} Shipments figures based on certification alone.
