= Hanamori =

Hanamori (written: 花森 or 花守) is a Japanese surname. Notable people with the surname include:

- Pink Hanamori (花森 ぴんく, born 1977), Japanese manga artist
- Yumiri Hanamori (花守 ゆみり, born 1997), Japanese voice actress

== Fictional characters ==
- Ichiko Hanamori (花森 一子), protagonist of the manga series Deka Wanko
- Shun Hanamori (花森 瞬), a character from Kado:_The_Right_Answer
