= Heisei retro =

Nostalgia for the Heisei era

Poster of the Neo Heisei Retro exhibition held at Seibu Shibuya

Heisei retro (Japanese: 平成レトロ) is a Japanese retro commercial aesthetic and fashion trend surrounding nostalgia for certain aspects of the Heisei era. Heisei retro is rooted in 1990s and 2000s nostalgia and primarily appeals to Millennials and Generation Z. It is closely linked with the Y2K aesthetic and with Gyaru culture.

The aesthetic is heavily associated with retro technology such as flip phones and digital cameras, toys such as the Tamagotchi, kawaii mascot characters and stationery items that feature them.

== Overview ==
Patrick St Michel said that there was a 1990s nostalgia boom by 2013. The term "Heisei retro" was reportedly coined by Mero Yamashita, a self-described Heisei retro culture researcher, who first began to use the term in 2017. In 2019, Heisei retro was said to include nostalgia for the later part of the 1990s and the earlier part of the 2000s. In 2021, Yamashita considered Heisei retro to be related to the period from 1989 to 2000.

Heisei retro is particularly popular with Generation Y and Generation Z. Some younger members of Generation Z are drawn to the style not out of personal nostalgia, but out of a fascination with the time period and culture.

Heisei retro was preceded by, and exists alongside, Shōwa nostalgia. Shōwa retro and Heisei retro sometimes overlap because some things that were popular at the end of the Shōwa era continued to be popular at the start of the Heisei era. Heisei retro is considered to be related to and heavily influenced by the Y2K aesthetic.

The phrase "Heisei retro" was nominated for the buzzword awards SNS Ryukogo Taisho 2022 and won a category of the buzzword awards JC & JK Ryukogo Taisho in the first half of 2022. By August 2023, there were approximately 47,000 posts under the hashtag "＃平成レトロ" on Instagram.

== Characters ==
A photograph of the Narumiya Happy Park store

Mascot characters are a large aspect of the Heisei retro trend, commonly seen as keychains and other merchandise. In the 1990s and 2000s, it was common to attach cell phone straps to flip phones, which people are recreating by attaching character charms to their smartphones. People enjoy collecting character goods from companies such as San-X (creator of characters like Tarepanda, Afro Ken and Nyan Nyan Nyanko) and Sanrio. These character goods are often distributed through gashapon.

The representative characters of children's clothing brands such as Mezzo Piano and Angel Blue, both owned by Narumiya International, are also popular within Heisei retro. In 2026, a dedicated store for the company's brand mascots, Narumiya Happy Park, officially opened in Shinjuku. Another notable brand is the 2004 arcade game Love and Berry: Dress Up and Dance!.

== Stationery ==
Cute stationery, especially stickers, were popular in the Heisei era and have seen a resurgence in popularity. Elementary school girls in the Heisei era would often collect and trade these stickers. Some people collect stickers in albums. A particularly notable brand of stickers is Q-Lia's Bonbon Drop stickers, which are made of raised resin. In 2025, the Don Quijote store in Beppu stocked 150 varieties of stickers, with representatives reporting a three times increase in sales after they expanded their variety. According to Kazunori Miura of the Chitose branch of Don Quijote, "some customers buy them for nostalgia, but many just want to collect again. People in their 20s and 30s, as well as children, are all buying them."

Other popular stationery items include memo notepads, sticky notes, and letter sets.

== Technology ==
A large part of Heisei nostalgia is focused around 1990s and 2000s technology. Digital cameras have seen a significant increase in popularity within the 2020s, as well as disposable cameras such as Utsurun-desu. Purikura machines, photo booths that allow for decoration of photos using digital effects and stickers, have also seen a resurgence. A smaller, pocket-sized version has been produced by T-Arts Co, powered by a smartphone app. Some newer purikura machines now have 2000s Gyaru-themed decor, featuring pink leopard print and hibiscus flowers. Garakei phones are another piece of Heisei-era technology that has seen revived popularity. Phones and other gadgets are often decorated with charms and rhinestones.

Other analog technology has also gained new popularity, including cassette tapes (despite being associated more with the Showa era). Yamashita collects defunct Heisei-era technology such as glowing phone antennas, pagers, and transparent appliances in the name of preservation.

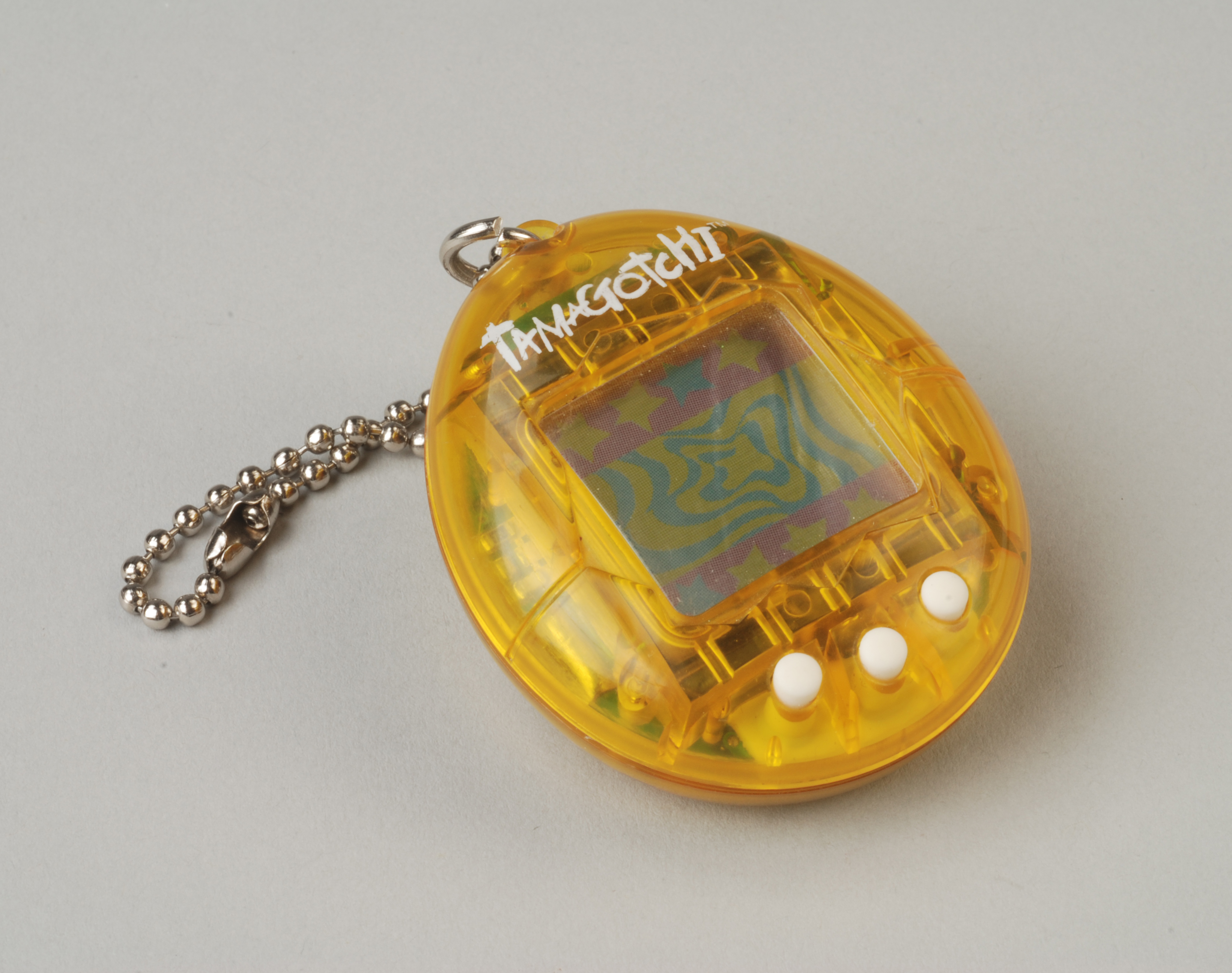
Tamagotchi from 1997

== Toys ==
Bandai's Tamagotchi virtual pets have become an important part of Heisei retro iconography. New versions of Heisei-era toys have been produced in the 2020s, including Beyblade, Hyper Yo-Yo, and the aforementioned Tamagotchi. The boom of 1990s nostalgia helped drive sales of the Tamagotchi Paradise, released in 2025. Beyblade and the Nintendo DS series are popular according to a poll ending in 2026.

== Food ==
In 2020, Cookpad released a series of Heisei retro-themed recipes, such as Tiramisu and Motsunabe. McDonald's Japan produced a Heisei retro menu in May 2023, when they announced that "Heisei burgers" would return to their menu, alongside various discontinued products.

== Media ==
=== Film ===
Sunny (2018) is a 1990s nostalgia film.

=== Television ===
Television series like Omusubi (2024), which is set in the Heisei era, and The Right to Judge (2025) have been cited as drawing influence from Heisei nostalgia. The latter show's theme song is Porno Graffiti's 2001 song "Agehachō", a popular song for karaoke, and other nostalgic songs from the era such as Under Graph's "Tsubasa", TM Revolution's "Hot Limit", and Morning Musume's "I Wish" also make appearances in the show. Shoujo anime series like Sailor Moon and Cardcaptor Sakura are targets of nostalgia for many. There are reboots of 1990s television series such as Sailor Moon (1992) and Neon Genesis Evangelion (1995).

=== Music ===
1990s and 2000s-themed playlists have seen significant popularity on Spotify in the 2020s, and songs from the era have been doing well on TikTok. AKB48 (2005 onwards) re-used ideas from Morning Musume (1997 onwards). In the 2019 Heisei retro broadcast Zozo Kayō-sai (Japanese: ZOZO歌謡祭), Nanase Aikawa performed a new version, with new lyrics, of her 1995 song Yumemiru Shoujou Ja Irarenai. The character played by Ken Matsudaira in Matsuken Samba was popular in 2023. As of 2022, the song "Romance no Kamisama" (1993) was popular on TikTok and the song "Cherry" (1996) by Spitz was popular on Spotify. In 2025, the 2003 song "Otsukare Summer" by Halcali was a viral trend on TikTok. A new music video for Orange Range's 2007 song "Ikenai Tokyo" amassed over 20 million views in three months. Other music associated with Heisei nostalgia includes Shibuya-kei and 2000s J-pop singers like Ringo Sheena, Ayumi Hamasaki, and Hikaru Utada.

== Fashion ==
Heisei retro fashion is influenced by and overlaps with Y2K fashion, sharing elements like platform shoes (popularized by Namie Amuro), miniskirts, and crop tops. Loose socks are a key staple of the Heisei retro style, as they were popularly worn by Gyaru in the 1990s, a subculture that Heisei retro draws from. Loose-fitting clothes similar to 1990s street fashion have gained popularity with young adults. Other influences on Heisei retro fashion include "Amekaji" style and other 2000s styles commonly seen in Harajuku. Makeup often incorporates thick false eyelashes, another element borrowed from gyaru culture. Makeup from the start of the 1990s was being revived during the 2010s.

== Exhibitions ==
There have been exhibitions themed around Heisei retro, including one at the Children's Future Museum in Toyohashi, one at the Daimaru Omeda store in Kita-ku, Osaka, and one at Seibu Shibuya.
