= Journal of Educational Psychology =

- Discipline: Educational psychology
- Language: English
- Edited by: Young-Suk Kim

Publication details
- History: 1910–present
- Publisher: American Psychological Association (United States)
- Frequency: 8/year
- Impact factor: 6.4 (2024)

Standard abbreviations
- ISO 4: J. Educ. Psychol.

Indexing
- ISSN: 0022-0663 (print); 1939-2176 (web)
- LCCN: e14000803

Links
- Journal homepage; Online access

The Journal of Educational Psychology is a peer-reviewed academic journal that was established in 1910 and covers educational psychology. It is published by the American Psychological Association.

The incoming editor-in-chief is Young-Suk Kim (University of California, Irvine). The journal publishes original psychological research on education at all ages and educational levels, as well as occasional theoretical and review articles deemed of particular importance.

According to the Journal Citation Reports, the journal has a 2024 impact factor of 6.4.
