= Commoditization =

Process where unique economic goods become interchangeable in the eyes of consumers

In business literature, commoditization is defined as the process by which goods that have economic value and are distinguishable in terms of attributes (uniqueness or brand) end up becoming simple commodities in the eyes of the market or consumers. It is the movement of a market from differentiated to undifferentiated price competition and from monopolistic competition to perfect competition. Hence, the key effect of commoditization is that the pricing power of the manufacturer or brand owner is weakened: when products become more similar from a buyer's point of view, they will tend to buy the cheapest.

This is not to be confused with commodification, which is the concept of objects or services being assigned an exchange value which they did not previously possess by their being produced and presented for sale, as opposed to personal use. One way to summarize the difference is that commoditization is about proprietary things becoming generic, whereas commodification is about nonsaleable things becoming saleable. In social sciences, particularly anthropology, the term is used interchangeably with commodification to describe the process of making commodities out of anything that was not available for trade previously.

Commoditization can be the desired outcome of an entity in the market, or it can be an unintentional outcome that no party actively sought to achieve, such as when trademarks become genericized. According to neoclassical economics, consumers can benefit from commoditization, since perfect competition usually leads to lower prices. Branded producers often suffer under commoditization, since the value of the brand (and ability to command price premiums) can be weakened. However, false commoditization can create substantial risk when premier products do have substantial value to offer, particularly in health, safety and security.

== See also ==
- Galápagos syndrome
