= E-kara =

Video game karaoke system

- Manufacturer: Takara
- Type: Home video game console; Karaoke
- Released: JP: October 20, 2000; NA: October 6, 2001
- Introductory price: US$59.99 (equivalent to $110 in 2025)
- Discontinued: 2009
- Units sold: 3.45 million (Japan)
- Online services: JP: E-kara Web
- Marketing target: Girls, ages 8–18
- Successor: Hi-kara

The E-kara (stylized in all lowercase) is a discontinued home video game console for karaoke created by Takara (later Takara Tomy). It was first launched in Japan on October 20, 2000, and was later released on October 6, 2001, in the United States through Hasbro. Its main unit was a microphone, with songs and games that could be played through removable cartridges, or, in later models, downloaded from the website E-kara Web. It was later discontinued in 2009 after the release of its successor, Hi-kara, on October 18, 2008.

== Features ==
=== Karaoke functions ===
The E-kara's main unit is the microphone. The microphone has built-in karaoke functions and can also be used to adjust the key up to 12 steps, the tempo up to 7 steps, and the volume. The microphone also allows for 3 types of echo — bath echo, hall echo, and reverberation — and 3 types of voice effects. The LCD screen on the microphone also displays the number corresponding to the song in the inserted cartridge.

The E-kara microphone can optionally run on batteries. The microphone has RCA connectors that are able to not only be plugged into the television, but portable music players, as well as audio and video systems in cars. The video connector is optional, as music can play without it. Up to 10 people can participate by daisy-chaining the microphones together.

=== Songs ===
Songs are played on the E-kara through removable cartridges that are inserted into the microphone. Some of the cartridges also included mini games. The cartridges are compatible with Pop it Up and Pop it Up 2, a home video rhythm game console series also produced by Takara. By 2004, songs were able to be downloaded from E-kara's website, E-kara Web, with the E-kara Mix. Over 700 songs are available on the E-kara cartridges, and over 2,000 songs were available for download on E-kara Web. In 2010, E-kara Web ended song downloads.

== Release history ==
=== E-kara models ===
The E-kara was first released on October 20, 2000, as part of Takara's "Plug It!" game series. A wireless version of the E-kara called the E-kara Pro was announced at the 2001 Tokyo Toy Show on March 23, 2001. An updated model called the E-kara N, with "N" standing for "next generation", was announced at the 2002 Tokyo Toy Show and released on June 21, 2002. The 4th generation model, E-kara Mix, was released on September 15, 2004, and allowed users to connect the E-kara to computers to download new songs, with up to 2,000 songs available.

=== Hi-kara ===
In June 2008, Takara Tomy introduced the Hi-kara as a successor to the E-kara, which was released on October 18, 2008. The Hi-kara is a 7 cm cube with a color LCD screen. The Hi-kara includes scoring and adjusting pitch, tempo, and echo. Up to 2 players can play using microphone headsets, and songs can be downloaded from computers using a downloader device that transfers data to cartridges. Approximately 3,500 songs were available for download. The official website announced that they were ending online services in June 2011.

=== Marketing ===
Various idol groups have been featured in E-kara's marketing campaigns, including N Moni, Bishojo Club 31, and, most notably, Morning Musume, the latter of whom was credited with boosting E-kara sales to 1 million units in 2001. Coinciding with the E-kara's 5th anniversary, Takara launched the first E-kara Star Auditions in 2004 where the winner will have a CD debut through Pony Canyon, a chance at becoming a model with Oscar Promotion, and an opportunity to appear in an E-kara commercial.

In 2002, in an attempt to market the E-kara N to young girls, Takara collaborated with the junior fashion brand Angel Blue to release a special version of the product. In the same year, the manga Pichi Pichi Pitch launched in the manga magazine Nakayoshi, following a similar marketing pattern in that the story was built around the E-kara. After the manga was adapted into the anime series Mermaid Melody Pichi Pichi Pitch, Takara introduced the E-Pitch, a version of the E-kara based on the one seen in the series, along with an updated version called the E-Pitch Pure to coincide with the show's second season. In 2006, Takara Tomy released the Kira Kara Starter Set to promote the anime adaptation of the Kirarin Revolution series.

Hasbro distributed the E-kara in the United States, launching the product on October 6, 2001. Hasbro spent US$5 million on its initial launch promotions, including producing its "Popstar" television commercial. In 2002, Hasbro launched a "Dare to Diva" press tour to promote the E-kara headset, with Jamie Lynn Spears appearing in the product's demonstration and its television commercial.

== Reception ==
By February 2001, Takara reported that they had sold 800,000 units of the E-kara and 2.5 million cartridges. By March 2001, sales were boosted to approximately 1 million units in Japan, which Takara attributed to the commercials for the product featuring girl group Morning Musume. By June 2008, the E-kara had sold approximately 3.45 million units in Japan.

In the United States, the E-kara won the Best Girls Toy category at Toy of the Year Awards in 2002.
