= Yume Yume Yu Yu =

Japanese anime and manga series

- Yume Yume*Yu Yu

ゆめゆめ☆ゆうゆう (Yume Yume☆Yū Yū)
- Genre: Magical girl, Romance
- Manga
- Written by: Pink Hanamori
- Published by: Kodansha
- Magazine: Nakayoshi
- Original run: November 2005 – 2007
- Volumes: 3

Yume Yume*Yu Yu (ゆめゆめ☆ゆうゆう, Yume Yume☆Yū Yū) is a Japanese shōjo manga and anime series created and drawn by Pink Hanamori. The manga is being published in the monthly shōjo manga anthology Nakayoshi. There are more than ten chapters published and most of them are compiled into volumes issued by Kodansha. It is licensed in German by Heyne.

Yume Yume*Yu Yu is loosely based upon the Shinto miko and shrines, as well as four constellations in the Chinese zodiac: Suzaku — The Vermilion Bird of the South (who represents the summer season and Yin,), Seiryuu — The Azure Dragon of the East (who represents the spring season as well as Yang), Genbu — The Black Tortoise of the North (who represents the winter season), and Byakko — The White Tiger of the West (who represents the fall season, Bai Hu in China).

== Plot ==
The story follows a young girl, Yume, who is clumsy and unpopular. While dozing in class, she has a vision of a young Miko, telling her that she must be the new Miko. She awakes with a mirror in her hands, and is confused by it. After school, the mirror reveals itself as a portal to a different world as a red-haired boy, named Rekka, appears chasing a unicorn, the peacekeeper of their world. The Azure Dragon of the East, or Seiryuu, shares that he is not happy a human of the Light world has become Miko, and tries to destroy Yume. None of the Guardians from the other world, except Rekka, believes in Yume. Rekka destroys the mirror so that the Other world-ers can not come through to harm Yume.

It is revealed that the world in which Rekka lives is suffering due to the Light world's exceptional development in such a short span of time. The Unicorn is the peacekeeper, and without the unicorn the world will become endangered. The goal of Yume and Rekka is to find the Unicorn and take it back to its home, as it is its own portal between worlds.

After a time of Rekka living in the Light world, he becomes the Kagura's cousin. Aoi, a boy at Yume's school, is soon revealed to be the King of the Eastern Skies of the Light world. Discovering this, the team decides they must find all the Guardians of the light world to help the Unicorn.

== Characters ==
=== Guardians of the Light World ===
Yume Kagura
The main character and Miko of the story. Although a somewhat simple-minded girl who pales in comparison to her perfect and talented twin sister, Yume embodies the power to save two worlds. As the new Miko, she is to gather up the four guardians of her own world in order to save them both. From the beginning of the story it is laid down that she believes in magic and casts protection spells on herself while she sleeps- which is why she was probably more accepting of her newfound abilities compared to other girls. Yume has a crush on Aoi, a boy at her school who is a student council member along with her sister, and who is also one of her protectors from this world, though that crush has begun to fade when she falls in love with Rekka, the Emperor of the South Sky of both worlds.

Unicorn (Female)
The girl that Kirin, the Other World Unicorn, has been searching for. She was hidden in a comma-shaped jewel, and the love between Rekka and Yume freed her.

Mizuki Aoi
King of the East Sky. His mark is located on his right chest. He didn't know that he was the Light world's Seiryuu until the bus incident while being forced into photography. He is the only one who noticed Yume from the beginning of the story, and loves her. He is on the student council with Hime. His holy animal's name is DoraDora. He also has a cousin, Kurobe-Sensei

Kurobe-sensei
The light world's King of the North Sky, Genbu. He discovered his destiny along with Mashiro 10 years previous when she found the mirror in her family's warehouse. The previous Miko told him to hurry and find the new Miko. The mark of Genbu is above his right eyebrow. Kurobe seems to dislike interactions between the opposite sex in teenagers, as he steals their gifts away or keeps couples apart. His cousin is Mizuki Aoi.

Kaneshiro Mashiro
The Light world's Queen of the West Sky, Byakko. She knew her standing as she appeared to Yume in the attack of Hime, as she found the mirror in her family's warehouse 10 years prior. Her mark is on her right upper chest. She is in love with Kurobe, though he rejected her; when Hime walked in while Mashiro was on Kurobe's lap, she mentions that Hime has the wrong idea. She is sensible and resourceful, even though she is an Idol.

=== Guardians of the Other World ===
Miko-sama
The previous Miko before Yume. She was loved and all things were at peace until she gave up her power to Yume. She was like a mother figure to Rekka.

Kirin, Unicorn (Male)
The keeper of peace in the Other world who escaped to the Light world to search for his other. He heals Yume and reveals he's always been searching for his loved one.

Rekka Sariu
A boy found in Yume's dreams who must protect the new Miko. He is the Emperor of the South Sky, Suzaku in both worlds. His mark is by his navel on the right side. He knew of his abilities in the beginning, and comes out of the Mirror with Lee (Rii), and destroys the mirror. At first he dislikes Yume being the new Miko, but quickly begins to accept her and starts to like her. Hime likes him, giving him handmade chocolates on Valentine's Day, though Rekka cannot return her feelings since his duty is to Yume, whom he loves.

Yuu Hokyuu
Rekka's childhood friend, and the Other world's Emperor of the North Sky, Genbu. His mark is under his left eye. He is reckless and has a high sense of loyalty.

Toufuu Nyan-Nyan
The Empress of the Eastern Sky, Seiryuu. Her Holy animal is Ryuu, a small dragon. She uses the male pronoun, 'boku', to refer to herself, making her a gruff person in speech, though she looks rather young and innocent.

FuuChii
Emperor of the Western Sky, Byakko. He is an estranged male with a tiger's tail and pointy, elf-like ears.

=== Other major characters ===
Hime Kagura
Yume's better twin, who gets good grades, is on the student council, and is well known at school. She has many friends and is technically perfect. She is in love with Rekka, whose feelings for her have not been returned, as he is in love with Yume. She goes in an angry frenzy, since she took the mirror and pieced it together. She then becomes the Miko for the Other World. She is jealous of Yume, for getting Rekka's attention.

Rii
Rii acts as a little guardian to Rekka, following him everywhere. She resembles a butterfly.

Yue
Yue is another 'little guardian', and is seen with the Other World's Seiryuu when he attacks Yume. She enters Hime's body in the story, and identifies her as the Other world's miko, and controls her.

== Chapters printed ==
- Volume 1 - Chapters 1 - 5
- Volume 2 - Chapters 6 - 10
- Volume 3 - Chapters 11 - 13
