= Bonbon Drop stickers =

Resin stickers by Q-Lia

- Type: Stickers
- Inventor: Nao Yamazaki
- Inception: March 2024
- Manufacturer: Q-Lia
- Available: Available
- Website: www.qlia.com

Bonbon Drop stickers (ボンボンドロップシール, Bonbon Doroppu shīru) are a line of 3D stickers by Japanese stationery company Q-Lia. Created by Nao Yamazaki, the stickers first launched in March 2024 and rose to high demand beginning in December 2024, becoming heavily associated with Heisei era (1989–2019) nostalgia and the re-emergence of the sticker boom in Japan.

== Creation ==
In Japan, drop stickers are 3D transparent glossy stickers created through a "high-precision" manufacturing process where resin is poured on top of the base of printed stickers. In early 2023, Nao Yamazaki, a designer at the Japanese stationery company Q-Lia, drew inspiration from the deco-boom (short for "decoration boom"), a resurgence of a hobby from the 2000s where people would decorate and bedazzle cases. The deco-boom started with idol photo card cases and later included phone cases, nail art, and electronic cigarette cases. Yamazaki stated that she had wanted to create "small, decorative items with easy-to-use transparency and a three-dimensional feel" and holds the patent to Bonbon Drop stickers. She also initially designed Bonbon Drop stickers with a younger audience in mind.

The development team came up with "Bonbon Drop" as the name of the sticker line for its catchiness and as a way to associate it with candy. The first line of Bonbon Drop stickers were launched during March 2024. Each sticker sheet is priced at ¥500.

== Popularity ==
=== Sales ===
Bonbon Drop stickers rapidly gained popularity in December 2024, when Q-Lia partnered with Sun-Star Stationery (a subsidiary of Bandai Namco Holdings) to release character collaborations of Bonbon Drop Stickers with Chiikawa and Sanrio characters. In addition, they also went viral on social media due to its association for the aesthetic of cuteness associated with the Heisei joji trend. By November 2025, 13 million sheets have been sold. As of February 2026, more than 15 million sheets have been sold.

The popularity of Bonbon Drop stickers have led to shortages in nationwide stationery retailers across Japan. Loft and Don Quijote reported long lines of customers waiting to buy Bonbon Drop stickers, which would sell out within minutes. Loft temporarily stopped selling Bonbon Drop stickers at their store locations. In January 2026, Shimamura's website crashed after opening pre-orders for Bonbon Drop stickers featuring Sanrio characters and Snoopy before cancelling them. Several stores have now been implementing a purchase limit for Bonbon Drop stickers.

On April 28, 2026, Asahi Shimbun released a reference book titled Bonbon Drop Seal: Perfect Book, showcasing 200 different types of Bonbon Drop stickers that Q-Lia has released.

=== Culture ===
Bonbon Drop stickers are associated with the re-emergence of sticker boom, a fad popular with girls in elementary school during the late 1990s and early 2000s where they would collect and trade stickers with classmates. It is also associated with nostalgia for the Heisei era (1989–2019), specifically the Heisei joji (young girls in the Heisei era) culture, a revival of the aesthetic of cuteness from the 1990s to early 2000s which began appearing in 2022 through social media. Bonbon Drop stickers are not only popular with young children, but also adult women, many of whom had grown up in the Heisei era. School children reported that Bonbon Drop stickers were considered "rare" and heavily sought after.

== Legal concerns ==
The demand for Bonbon Drop stickers have led to concerns about scalping and counterfeits. Sun-Star Stationery released a statement saying that they would take legal action against the production of counterfeits. In addition, Japanese e-commerce company Mercari stated to The Nikkei that they were working on agreement with Sun-Star Stationery to assess counterfeits in the market following a reseller listing a total of 27 Bonbon Drop sticker sheets for ¥330,000 on the app.

On January 18, 2026, two men were arrested in Saitama Prefecture on suspicion of copyright infringement and possessing 201 counterfeit Bonbon Drop stickers with intent to sell. On February 11, 2026, a couple in Urasoe, Okinawa, were arrested for stealing 22 sheets of Bonbon Drop stickers.
