= Herbert W. Marsh =

Psychologist

- Education: University of California, Berkeley
- Scientific career
- Fields: Psychology
- Workplaces: University of California, Los Angeles
- Thesis: Judgmental anchoring : Stimulus and response variables (1974)
- Doctoral advisor: Allen Parducci

Herbert W. Marsh is an educational psychologist who has published influential research on self-concept, motivation and university students' evaluations of teaching effectiveness. The website of Oxford University, where he is currently a faculty member, notes the following.

Professor Marsh was recognised as the most productive educational psychologist in the world, one of the top 10 international researchers in Higher Education and in Social Psychology, and the 11th most productive researcher in the world across all disciplines of psychology. He is a highly cited researcher on ISI’s list of the “world's most cited and influential scientific authors over a sustained period according to a common standard that covers all countries and all scientific disciplines," one of only 8 social science researchers from the United Kingdom to achieve this recognition.

Marsh completed undergraduate and master's degrees at Indiana University Bloomington before earning a PhD in at the University of California at Los Angeles in 1974. He was Head of Evaluation Research Services at the University of Southern California before moving to Australia in 1980 to take a faculty position at Sydney University. He joined the University of Western Sydney where he established the Self-concept Enhancement and Learning Facilitation (SELF) Research Centre. In 2006, Marsh became a Professor at the University of Oxford. In 2014, Marsh joined the Australian Catholic University in the Institute for Positive Psychology and Education.

== See also ==
- Big-fish-little-pond effect
