= Falls Apart (Sugar Ray song) =

1999 single by Sugar Ray

Single by Sugar Ray

from the album 14:59
- Released: May 12, 1999
- Genre: Power pop
- Length: 4:15 (album version); 4:19 (radio version)
- Label: Atlantic; Lava
- Songwriters: Sugar Ray; David Kahne
- Producer: David Kahne

Sugar Ray singles chronology
"Every Morning" (1999)	"Falls Apart" (1999)	"Someday" (1999)

Music video
- "Falls Apart" on YouTube

"Falls Apart" is a song by American rock band Sugar Ray from their third studio album, 14:59 (1999). The song was released commercially in Japan as the album's second single on May 12, 1999, and was serviced to US radio on November 22, 1999, as the album's third single. "Falls Apart" reached number 29 on the US Billboard Hot 100 and number five on the Billboard Modern Rock Tracks chart. Outside the US, the single peaked at number 15 in Canada, number 33 in New Zealand, and number 54 in Australia.

== Track listings ==
UK and Australian CD single

1. "Falls Apart" (album version) – 4:15
2. "Falls Apart" (edit) – 4:18
3. "Falls Apart" (instrumental) – 3:54

Japanese CD single

1. "Falls Apart" (edit)
2. "Falls Apart" (album version)
3. "Someday" (live)
4. "Every Morning" (live)

== Charts ==
=== Weekly charts ===
Weekly chart performance for "Falls Apart"
Chart (1999–2000)	Peak position
Australia (ARIA)	54
Canada Top Singles (RPM)	15
Canada Adult Contemporary (RPM)	30
New Zealand (Recorded Music NZ)	33
US Billboard Hot 100	29
US Adult Pop Airplay (Billboard)	16
US Alternative Airplay (Billboard)	5
US Pop Airplay (Billboard)	12

=== Year-end charts ===
1999 year-end chart performance for "Falls Apart"
Chart (1999)	Position
US Modern Rock Tracks (Billboard)	59

2000 year-end chart performance for "Falls Apart"
Chart (2000)	Position
US Adult Top 40 (Billboard)	42
US Mainstream Top 40 (Billboard)	52

== Release history ==
Release dates and formats for "Falls Apart"
Region	Date	Format(s)	Label(s)	Ref(s).
Japan	May 12, 1999	CD	Atlantic; Lava	
United States	November 22, 1999	Hot adult contemporary; modern adult contemporary radio	Atlantic; Lava	
United States	November 23, 1999	Contemporary hit radio	Atlantic; Lava	
United States	December 7, 1999	Alternative radio	Atlantic; Lava	
