= Galápagos syndrome =

Term in business studies on product development

Galápagos syndrome (ガラパゴス化, Garapagosu-ka; / Galápagosization) is a term of Japanese origin used in business studies to refer to an isolated development branch of a globally available product. The term is used as an analogy to a part of Charles Darwin's On the Origin of Species. Darwin encountered in the Galápagos Islands isolated flora and fauna, which had undergone evolutionary changes independently from the mainland. This phenomenon was a key to the development of evolutionary theory. Darwin stated that due to the differences in environment from one island to another, species adapted to make survival more viable in the local environment of each island. Similarly, a development of goods "in relative isolation from the rest of the world because of a focus on the local market" can lead to similarly differing products.

The term "Galápagos syndrome" has been used as a metaphor outside the field of business jargon. The term "Galápagosization", referring to the process of the isolation of Japanese "Galápagos-thinking", links this process to the Japanese island mentality.

== Examples in Japan ==
=== Technology ===
==== Mobile phones ====
The term "Galápagos syndrome" was originally coined to refer to Japanese 3G mobile phones, which had developed a large number of specialized features that were widely adopted in the Japanese market, but were unsuccessful abroad. While the original usage of the term was to describe highly advanced phones that were incompatible outside of Japanese networks, as the mobile phone industry underwent drastic changes globally, the term was used to emphasize the associated anxiety about how the development of Japanese mobile phones and those in the worldwide economy went along different paths. A derived term is Gara-phone (ガラケー, gara-kei), blending with "mobile phone" (携帯, keitai), used to refer to Japanese feature phones, by contrast with newer smart phones. Takeshi Natsuno, professor at Tokyo's Keio University, explained, "Japan's cellphones are like the endemic species that Darwin encountered on the Galápagos Islands—fantastically evolved and divergent from their mainland cousins." "Japanese phones suffer from 'Galapagos Syndrome'—are too complex to survive abroad."

==== Cash machines ====
Across Japan, the majority of the 190,000 ATMs do not accept bank and credit cards that have been issued outside of the country. According to an April 2022 article, only about 20,000 post offices and convenience stores allow retrieving cash using non-Japanese bank cards. The Japanese government has expressed concern about this issue, and as a result the number of ATMs that accept foreign cards is slowly increasing.

==== Wallet phone ====
In 2004, the wallet phone was introduced in Japan as a means to allow mobile payment alongside numerous other applications. In some ways the wallet phone can be seen as a predecessor of mobile payment tools that were later released on the global market such as Apple Pay or Google Wallet.

==== Streaming ====
In 2026, criticism over Netflix's acquisition of exclusive rights to the World Baseball Classic (which had previously been carried by pay television channel J Sports, but with Japan games shown on free-to-air television) was critiqued by some as an example of Galápagos syndrome, noting preferences towards streaming services by younger audiences, the company's global presence, and its lower cost in comparison to J Sports (with Netflix having offered a special offer of one month for 500 yen during the tournament).

=== Kei cars (軽自動車) ===
Kei cars ("light cars") are small four-wheeled vehicles/cars that have an engine of less than 660cc and enjoy preferential treatment in the form of tax advantages and lower insurance costs. Originally the Japanese government encouraged the use of those "light cars". This category of cars features a number of different car types including sport cars, minivans and commercial vehicles. However, Kei cars are not seen as profitable in export markets and therefore are only part of the Japanese domestic automobile market. Despite no significant global success, major Japanese car manufacturers such as Suzuki, Mitsubishi, Daihatsu and Honda still produce models belonging to the Kei car category.

== Handling the Japanese Galápagos syndrome ==
There are many associated issues with the inability to compete on the international export market. In order to revive the parts of the Japanese economy that have suffered from the "Galápagosization", affected businesses had to find the reasons responsible for the development.

The Galápagosization of Japan continues. According to a survey released today, a shocking two-thirds of the country’s white-collar workers said they didn’t want to work abroad ... ever.

=== Reasons for the issue and associated implications for businesses ===
Furthermore, this has led a number of Japanese companies to adapt their business strategies. Hiroshi Mikitani, CEO of e-commerce company Rakuten, sees the exclusive use of Japanese in workplaces at the centre of the problem. Following his belief that "a language will open your eyes to the 'global', and you will break free from this conventional wisdom of a pure Japan", the co-founder and CEO of Rakuten made English the main language to be spoken in the company. Gerhard Fasol, the only European member of Euro Technology Japan's "Galapagos study group", stated that another reason for the non-success of some innovative Japanese products is Europe's conservative standpoint when it comes to certain standards. In the belief that it will improve international competitiveness Tadashi Yanai, the founder and president of Fast Retailing, has decided to change the way the firm works against classical Japanese business methods. A shift of the production of some textiles out of Japan to Southeast Asia was a move to the low-wage-labour market, that aimed to enable them to compete on price in the international textile market. Another factor which McKinsey & Company points out is the need for Japanese companies to adapt to stronger competition when entering global markets. This should be done by accepting to think in "new and unfamiliar ways about organization, marketing, and strategy", whilst the traditional practices that helped the companies to become a big player in the Japanese market shall be discontinued. Despite the fact that companies have started to address the issue, which could have a link to the total value of exports increasing over the past five years, there are concerns about the future Galápagosization of Japan.

=== Future threats ===
With the ageing and shrinking Japanese population, the fact that fewer and fewer students study abroad to acquire a more internationally oriented university education is reason for concerns over the future of the Japanese economy. Furthermore, there is a conception that the younger generation could enhance the Galápagos effect due to a lack of interest in international education and work placements. Kiyoshi Takeuchi, sociology professor at the Sophia university, describes the young generation to have less "ambition and motivation" as a result from the fear that a wrong move could have negative effects.

== Usage of the term referring to instances outside Japan ==
=== China ===
- Stephen Ezell and Robert D. Atkinson describe a similar phenomenon pointing out associated threats this could mean for the Chinese economy. The selling of a product in China could become more expensive for foreign producers due to the fact that they now have to incorporate the Chinese technology standards into their firm. In theory, this could be beneficial for domestic producers. However, this could also lead to an isolation of the respective domestic producers due to less international competitiveness. "China has made the development of indigenous technology standards ... a core component of its industrial development strategy. ... But, by using indigenous rather than global technology standards for ICT products, China risks engendering a 'Galapagos Island' effect that isolates Chinese ICT products, technologies, and markets."

=== Europe ===
- Mark Leonard describes threats of how, against the predictions he made in 2005 in his book Why Europe Will Run the 21st Century, the political development of the European Union happened isolated and differently than in any other political system in the world. "Europe might now be facing its own 'Galápagos moment'. ... It may be that Europe’s postmodern order has become so advanced and particular to its environment that it is impossible for others to follow. It evolved in a protective ecosystem, shielded from the more muscular, 'modern' world where most people live."

=== United States ===
- The United States was slow to adopt the EMV standard for credit and debit cards (as opposed to swiped magnetic stripe cards), which have been widely-adopted elsewhere, with merchants citing the cost of upgrading hardware and other systems to support it. Work to encourage transition began in 2015 following a series of high-profile retail data breaches involving credit card data, as well as increased frustration by travelers who found themselves increasingly inconvenienced when travelling abroad where they have phased out the magnetic stripe or where automated kiosks abroad would not accept non-EMV chipped cards. Payment providers implemented deadlines under which liability for fraud would shift to merchants if they did not begin accepting EMV payments by a specific date. As of April 2016, 70% of U.S. consumers had EMV cards, and around half of merchants were EMV compliant as of December 2016. However, the rollout has faced challenges, including merchants with EMV-compatible hardware that do not support EMV transactions due to a lack of certification or software support, and complaints that chip-based transactions took more time to process than swipe cards.
- According to a March 2008 Financial Times article, American-made cars suffered from the Galápagos syndrome, as they evolved separately from those of the global marketplace.

== See also ==
- Big in Japan (phrase)
- Commoditization
- Exceptionalism
- In-group favouritism
- Invented here
- Island syndrome
- Not invented here
- World famous in New Zealand
