= Another Rosie Christmas =

Studio album by Rosie O'Donnell
- Released: October 31, 2000
- Genre: Christmas
- Length: 50:09
- Label: Columbia

Rosie O'Donnell chronology
A Rosie Christmas (1999)	Another Rosie Christmas (2000)

Another Rosie Christmas is the second studio album by American comedian Rosie O'Donnell. The album was released by Columbia Records on October 31, 2000.

== Critical reception ==
Professional ratings
Review scores
Source	Rating
AllMusic	3/5 stars

In a retrospective review for AllMusic, William Ruhlmann said: "Leaving aside the unwanted intrusions on the album by its top-billed performer, the record's stylistic range is so broad there's bound to be some track for any listener to like, as well as a couple to dislike."

== Chart performance ==
Another Rosie Christmas peaked at number 45 on the US Billboard 200 and number three on the US Top Holiday Albums.

== Track listing ==
No.	Title	Writer(s)	Performer(s)	Length
1.	"Rockin' Around The Christmas Tree"	Johnny Marks	Jessica Simpson; Rosie O'Donnell	2:06
2.	"Nuttin' For Christmas"	Roy Bennett; Sid Tepper	Smash Mouth; Rosie O'Donnell	2:40
3.	"Winter Wonderland"	Dick Smith	Macy Gray; Rosie O'Donnell	3:01
4.	"Merry Christmas From The Family"	Robert Earl Keen, Jr.	Dixie Chicks; Rosie O'Donnell	6:11
5.	"Face Of Love"	Jewel Kilcher	Jewel	3:28
6.	"Ay, Ay, Ay It's Christmas"	Robert Ezrin; Desmond Child	Ricky Martin; Rosie O'Donnell	3:04
7.	"Spread A Little Love On Christmas Day"	Beyoncé	Destiny's Child	3:41
8.	"The Bells Of St. Paul"	Maury Yeston	Linda Eder	4:25
9.	"Silver Bells"	Jay Livingston; Ray Evans	Sugar Ray; Rosie O'Donnell	2:41
10.	"I'm Gonna E-Mail Santa"	Randle Chowning; Ray Benson; Mark Morton	Billy Gilman; Rosie O'Donnell	3:21
11.	"Christmas Auld Lang Syne"	Manny Curtis; Francis Military	Marc Anthony	3:05
12.	"The Prince Of Peace"	Charles Wesley; Felix Mendelssohn; Paul O'Neill	Trans-Siberian Orchestra; Marlene Danielle	3:32
13.	"Rosie Christmas"	Denise Rich; Donna Summer; Garianno Lorenzo	Donna Summer	4:40
14.	"Because It's Christmas (For All The Children)"	Bruce Sussman; Jack Feldman	Barry Manilow; Rosie O'Donnell	4:14

== Charts ==
Weekly chart performance for Another Rosie Christmas
Chart (2000)	Peak position
US Billboard 200	45
US Top Holiday Albums (Billboard)	3

=== Year-end charts ===
Year-end chart performance for Another Rosie Christmas
Chart (2000)	Position
Canadian Albums (Nielsen SoundScan)	163

== Certifications ==
Region	Certification	Certified units/sales
United States (RIAA)	Gold	500,000^{^}
^{^} Shipments figures based on certification alone.
