= Young-Suk Kim =

Educational psychologist

- Occupation: Professor
- Awards: 2013 Presidential Early Career Awards for Scientists and Engineers

Academic background
- Education: Kyungpook National University (1993); San Francisco State University (1997); Harvard University (2007)

Academic work
- Institutions: University of California, Irvine

Young-Suk Kim is an educational psychologist known for her research on the science of reading. She is Senior Associate Dean and Professor of Education at the University of California, Irvine.

Kim was awarded a Presidential Early Career Award for Scientists and Engineers (PECASE) from the White House in 2013. She was honored by the journal Contemporary Educational Psychology in 2016 for being "One of the most productive scholars in Educational Psychology" from 2009 to 2014. While on the faculty at Florida State University, she received the University Teaching Award in 2013, the Developing Scholar Award in 2014, and the Robert M. Gagné Research Award in 2016. In 2022, Kim was listed as the 2nd most productive researcher in the field of literacy, according to an article in Educational Psychology Review.

== Biography ==
Kim received her Bachelor of Arts at Kyungpook National University with a major in English linguistics and literature and minor in secondary school teaching in 1993. Kim then earned a Master in Teaching English to Speakers of Other Languages (TESOL) at San Francisco State University in 1997. She received her Master of Education at Harvard University with a focus on human development and culture in 2003. She then obtained her Doctor of Education in human development and psychology at Harvard University in 2007 under the supervision of Catherine E. Snow.

In 2007, Kim became a faculty associate of Florida State University's Florida Center for Reading Research, and an assistant professor at Florida State University's School of Teacher Education. She then worked as a faculty of the Predoctoral Interdisciplinary Research Training (PIRT) Program at the US Department of Education's Institute of Education Sciences from 2009 - 2016. From 2015 - 2016, Kim served as the associate director of the Florida Center for Reading Research. She joined the faculty of the University of California at Irvine in 2016.

== Research ==
Kim's research focuses on literacy acquisition and instruction. This includes identifying early literacy predictors, reading fluency, reading comprehension, and writing composition of English-speaking children. Kim also examines the development of effective instructional approaches for children from linguistically, culturally, and economically diverse backgrounds. Her research has been supported by the US Department of Education, the Institute of Education Sciences, and the National Institute of Child Heath and Human Development.

One of her most cited works, "Reading fluency: The whole is more than the parts" co-authored with Tami Katzir, Maryanne Wolf, Beth O'Brien, Becky Kennedy, Maureen Lovett and Robin Morris, examined the multidimensional nature of fluency in a sample of 123 dyslexic children in second and third grade. The authors suggest that phonological awareness, rapid letter naming, and orthographic pattern recognition contribute to word-reading skills.

== Selected publications ==
- Katzir, T., Kim, Y., Wolf, M., O’Brien, B., Kennedy, B., Lovett, M., & Morris, R. (2006). Reading fluency: The whole is more than the parts. Annals of Dyslexia, 56(1), 51–82.
- Kim, Y. S., Petscher, Y., Schatschneider, C., & Foorman, B. (2010). Does growth rate in oral reading fluency matter in predicting reading comprehension achievement?. Journal of Educational Psychology, 102(3), 652–667.
- Kim, Y. S., Wagner, R. K., & Foster, E. (2011). Relations among oral reading fluency, silent reading fluency, and reading comprehension: A latent variable study of first-grade readers. Scientific Studies of Reading, 15(4), 338–362.
- Puranik, C. S., Lonigan, C. J., & Kim, Y. S. (2011). Contributions of emergent literacy skills to name writing, letter writing, and spelling in preschool children. Early Childhood Research Quarterly, 26(4), 465–474.
