= Every Morning (Sugar Ray song) =

1999 single by Sugar Ray

Single by Sugar Ray

from the album 14:59
- B-side: "Even Though"
- Released: January 25, 1999
- Studio: Swing House; Sunset Sound; Ocean Way Recording; Studio 56 (Los Angeles)
- Genre: Alternative rock; flamenco pop
- Length: 3:39
- Label: Atlantic; Lava
- Songwriters: Sugar Ray; David Kahne; Richard Bean; Abel Zarate; Pablo Tellez
- Producer: David Kahne

Sugar Ray singles chronology
"RPM" (1997)	"Every Morning" (1999)	"Falls Apart" (1999)

Music video
- "Every Morning" on YouTube

"Every Morning" is a song by American rock band Sugar Ray, released as the lead single from their third studio album, 14:59 (1999). The track is an alternative rock and flamenco pop song that references Malo's "Suavecito" and Hugh Masekela's "Grazing in the Grass". Serviced to US radio in December 1998, "Every Morning" was physically released in Japan in January 1999 and in the United States that March, making it Sugar Ray's first commercially available single in the US.

"Every Morning" reached number one on both the US Billboard Modern Rock Tracks chart and the Canadian RPM 100 Hit Tracks chart, becoming Canada's second-most successful single of 1999. The song also reached number three on the Billboard Hot 100 and number 10 on the UK Singles Chart, becoming the band's highest-charting single on both rankings.

== Composition ==
"Every Morning" is an alternative rock and flamenco pop song. It is written in common time with a key of A♭ major and proceeds at a moderate tempo, played mezzo-forte. The song has a chord progression of A♭–D♭–A♭–D♭–E♭5. The chorus of the song references "Suavecito" by the Chicano music group Malo, as well as Hugh Masekela's 1968 hit "Grazing in the Grass". Lead vocalist Mark McGrath explained, "We referenced 'Suavecito' because growing up in California, you know, that was just like the low rider anthem. Any car show or swap meet you'd ever go by, you'd always hear that [song] and that just stuck in your mind." He added, "We actually came up with that part, and it was very similar to Malo's part. We were sort of imitating it, and then we said, 'Let's just leave it, we're gonna change it later.' It really makes the song – we think – so we just left it."

== Accolades ==
The track was ranked number 98th on the Triple J Hottest 100 of 1999, Australia's largest annual music poll which is run by the Triple J station. It also ranked 162nd on Australian radio station Triple M's list of the top 400 greatest songs of all time. In 2019, Billboard placed it 58th on a list of the "99 Greatest Songs of 1999". In 2023, American Songwriter ranked it second on their list of Sugar Ray's top 10 songs, behind only "Fly".

== Track listings ==
US 7-inch, CD, and cassette single

1. "Every Morning" – 3:39
2. "Even Though" – 2:35

UK, European, Australian, and Japanese CD single

1. "Every Morning" – 3:39
2. "Rivers" – 2:50
3. "Aim for Me" (main version) – 2:29

== Credits and personnel ==
Credits are taken from the liner notes of the CD singles.

Studios

- Recorded at Swing House, Sunset Sound Studio, Ocean Way Recording, and Studio 56 (Los Angeles)
- Mixed at Scream House (Los Angeles)
- Mastered at Precision (Los Angeles)

Personnel

- Sugar Ray – writing, vocals
- David Kahne – additional writing, production, programming, engineering, mixing, mastering
- Richard Bean – additional writing
- Abel Zarate – additional writing
- Pablo Tellez – additional writing
- John Travis – engineering, mixing
- Steve Gallagher – additional engineering

== Charts ==
=== Weekly charts ===
Chart (1999)	Peak position
Australia (ARIA)	17
Canada Top Singles (RPM)	1
Canada Adult Contemporary (RPM)	10
Canada Rock/Alternative (RPM)	21
Europe (Eurochart Hot 100)	37
Germany (GfK)	86
Iceland (Íslenski Listinn Topp 40)	21
Ireland (IRMA)	24
New Zealand (Recorded Music NZ)	17
Scottish Singles Sales (Official Charts)	10
UK Singles (Official Charts)	10
US Billboard Hot 100	3
US Adult Alternative Airplay (Billboard)	1
US Adult Contemporary (Billboard)	27
US Adult Pop Airplay (Billboard)	1
US Alternative Airplay (Billboard)	1
US Mainstream Rock (Billboard)	38
US Pop Airplay (Billboard)	1

=== Year-end charts ===
Chart (1999)	Position
Australia (ARIA)	62
Canada Top Singles (RPM)	2
Canada Adult Contemporary (RPM)	23
UK Singles (OCC)	163
UK Airplay (Music Week)	16
US Billboard Hot 100	8
US Adult Top 40 (Billboard)	4
US Mainstream Top 40 (Billboard)	4
US Modern Rock Tracks (Billboard)	5
US Triple-A (Billboard)	8

== Certifications ==
Region	Certification	Certified units/sales
Australia (ARIA)	Gold	35,000^{^}
New Zealand (RMNZ)	Platinum	30,000^{‡}
United States (RIAA)	Gold	500,000^{^}
^{^} Shipments figures based on certification alone.

== Release history ==
Region	Date	Format(s)	Label(s)	Ref.
United States	December 1, 1998	Alternative radio	Atlantic; Lava	
United States	December 15, 1998	Contemporary hit radio	Atlantic; Lava	
Japan	January 25, 1999	CD	Atlantic; Lava	
United States	March 16, 1999	7-inch vinyl; CD; cassette	Atlantic; Lava	
United Kingdom	May 17, 1999	CD; cassette	Atlantic; Lava	
