= Pink Hanamori =

Japanese manga artist

Pink Hanamori (花森 ぴんく, Hanamori Pinku; born November 5, 1977 in Shizuoka, Japan) is a Japanese manga artist known for illustrating the manga Mermaid Melody Pichi Pichi Pitch which was written by Michiko Yokote. Michiyo Kikuta (Mamotte! Lollipop) once worked under Hanamori as an assistant. Hanamori is a fan of Shōnen manga, and works for Nakayoshi. She cited Yoshihiro Togashi's Yu Yu Hakusho as her biggest influence, alongside artwork by Megumi Tachikawa.

On July 1, 2021, it was announced that Pink Hanamori would be producing a sequel to Mermaid Melody Pichi Pichi Pitch, given the title Mermaid Melody Pichi Pichi Pitch Aqua. The series is to be published monthly in Nakayoshi magazine starting from August 3, 2021.

== Works ==
=== Manga series ===
- Mermaid Melody Pichi Pichi Pitch Aqua (August 2021 – Ongoing)
- Sapphire: Princess Knight (Sapphire: Ribbon no Kishi) (April 3, 2008 – July 3, 2009)
- My Fiancé is a Monster!? (フィアンセはモンスター！？, Fiancé wa Monster!?; September 3, 2007 – February 3, 2008)
- Yume Yume Yu Yu (ゆめゆめ☆ゆうゆう, Yume Yume Yū Yū; December 3, 2005 – January 3, 2007; 3 tankoban (volumes))
- Mermaid Melody Pichi Pichi Pitch (August 2002 – March 2005)

=== Manga one-shots ===
- Miss Dieter Heroine (Debut work winning Nakayoshi's New Faces contest)
- Get Nude! (Story after debut work)
- Moonlight Goddess Diana (Story after debut, with color pages)
- Cherry ♥ Blossom (Story after debut, with color pages and published in the main Nakayoshi magazine)

== Reference sites and more information ==
- Pink Hanamori's Official Site, LIPS (in Japanese) (Now Closed)
- Pink Hanamori's Official Blog, Blog (in Japanese) (Now Closed)
- Pink Hanamori at Anime News Network's encyclopedia (Now Closed)
- Pink Hanamori at Nakayoshi Online (in Japanese)
- Pink Hanamori's Manga at Nakayoshi Online (in Japanese)
