= Not invented here =

Management attitude for innovation or development

Not invented here (NIH) is the tendency to avoid using or buying products, research, standards, or knowledge from external origins. It is usually adopted by social, corporate, or institutional cultures. Since 2014, management research has shown the existence of a strong bias against ideas from the outside.

The reasons for not wanting to use the work of others are varied, but can include a desire to support a local economy instead of paying royalties to a foreign license-holder, fear of patent infringement, lack of understanding of the foreign work, an unwillingness to acknowledge or value the work of others, jealousy, belief perseverance, or forming part of a wider turf war. As a social phenomenon, this tendency can manifest itself as an unwillingness to adopt an idea or product because it originates from another culture, a form of tribalism.

The term is typically used in a pejorative sense. The opposite predisposition is sometimes called "invented here", "not invented there", "proudly found elsewhere" (PFE) or "invented elsewhere".

== Scientific study ==
A 1982 study by Ralph Katz and Thomas J. Allen provides empirical evidence for the "not invented here" syndrome, showing that the performance of R&D project groups declines after about five years, which they attribute to the groups becoming increasingly insular and communicating less with key information sources outside the group.

== See also ==
- Anti-pattern
- Appeal to spite
- Association fallacy
- De facto standard
- Dogfooding
- Editor wars
- Endowment effect – ascribing higher value to what is one's own
- Ethnocentrism
- Galápagos syndrome
- Genetic fallacy
- Groupthink
- IKEA effect
- In-group favoritism
- List of cognitive biases
- Protectionism
- Reinventing the wheel
- Wishful thinking
- Xenophobia
- You aren't gonna need it (YAGNI)
