= Big in Japan (phrase) =

Musical artist expression

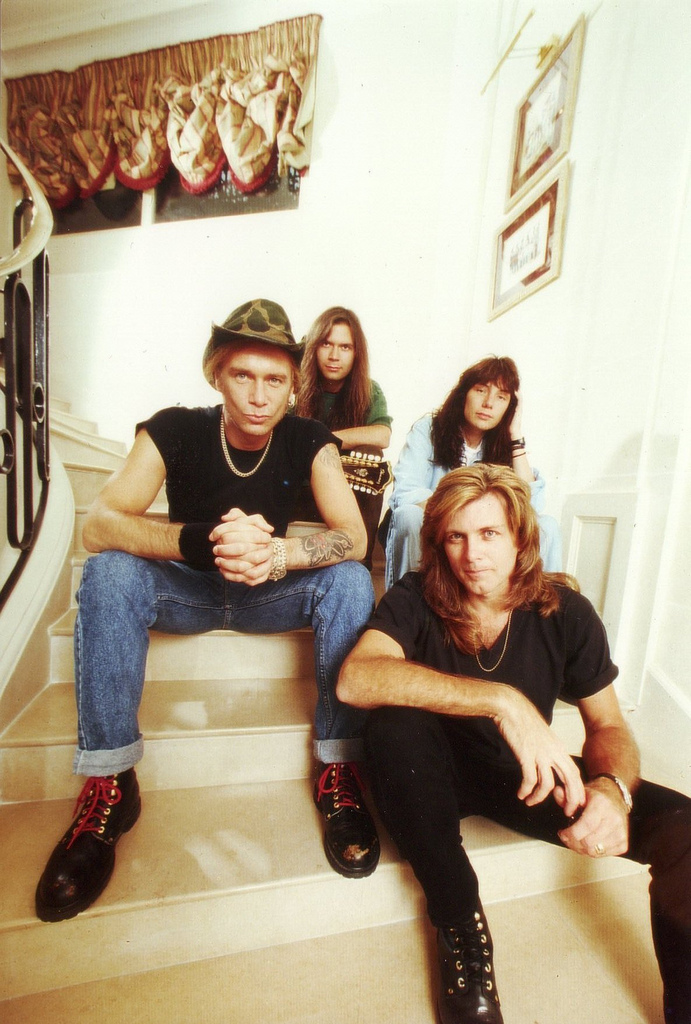
Mr. Big, pictured here in 1992, were a “Big in Japan” band from the United States. They were one of the two most popular foreign music (Note: "Yōgaku" ("Foreign music"), every music from an outer place, more specifically, the Western world) artists in Japan, alongside Bon Jovi. Outside of Japan, Mr. Big are generally considered a one-hit wonder for their single "To Be with You".

Big in Japan is an expression that can describe Western (especially American or European) musical groups who achieve success in Japan at higher levels than they do in other parts of the world (including their home nations). The phrase began to appear in several major Japanese foreign-rock magazines, especially Music Life magazine, in the late 1970s, though the phenomenon was noted prior to this. As a reference to this original usage, a modern, ironic use of the expression is to mean successful in a limited, potentially comical, oddly specific or possibly unverifiable way. Japan had been the world's second largest economy for decades, and still remains the second largest music market after the United States.

== Original usage ==
The concept of being "big in Japan" predates the popularization of the phrase. Neil Sedaka made it big in Japan with "One Way Ticket" in 1961, before breaking through in his native United States. Sedaka noted that Elvis Presley, the biggest rock star in America in the late 1950s, never left North America/Hawaii (in part because his agent Colonel Tom Parker lived in the U.S. illegally), and this opened opportunities in foreign markets such as Japan for more obscure artists such as Sedaka to gain a foothold there.

Another example is The Ventures, an American band formed in 1958 and touring Japan every year between 1964 and 2019. While the Ventures enjoyed notable success in the United States throughout the 1960s, they had a culturally significant impact in Japan, with their 1962 tour kicking off the eleki boom and ushering in the group sounds genre. The band became entrenched in Japanese rock culture, outselling the Beatles 2-to-1 during the mid-1960s, spawning hundreds of tribute bands, writing dozens of hit songs for the Japanese market (including the country's first million-selling single), and logging over 2,000 concerts in the country by 2006.

During this time, other groups achieved greater success in Japan than in their home countries. The Human Beinz, one-hit wonders in their native United States, scored two number one hit singles in Japan. Swedish band The Spotnicks toured Japan in 1966 after their song "Karelia" topped the Japanese charts the year prior, with hardly any promotion by the band. Around this time, the band's popularity in Europe had been waning due to changing musical tastes, particularly in their home country where they had relatively few hits, none of them topping the charts. They went on a few more tours there in the late 1960s and occasionally toured there in the 1970s, 1980s and for the last time in 1998. Jimmy Osmond, typically a side show to his older brothers The Osmonds in North America and Europe, cut several tracks in Japanese and received several gold records for his recordings. The American band Mountain reformed for a successful tour of Japan in 1973. A live album titled Twin Peaks was released in 1974. Mountain bass player and vocalist Felix Pappalardi then worked with the Japanese band Creation in 1976.

The phrase "big in Japan" began to take hold in the mid-to-late 1970s. In many cases, the "big in Japan" artists became popular in Japan due to being featured by Music Life, one of the magazines credited with popularizing the phrase. In mid-1977, The Runaways, who struggled to make a mark in America, were the fourth most popular imported musical act in Japan, just behind The Beatles and Led Zeppelin.

While initially unsuccessful in their home country and elsewhere, the British new wave band Japan found great success in Japan, and were voted the second most popular group in Japan in 1978, and topped the list the following year. In March 1979, Japan sold out the 11,000 seat capacity Budokan Theatre three days in a row. While largely ignored in their home country, their late 1979 album Quiet Life had the distinction of becoming the first foreign rock record to enter the national Japanese chart.

Anglo-Irish musical girl group the Nolans, who were virtually unknown in North America, sold over 12 million records in Japan, outselling The Beatles, Michael Jackson, Adele, and Ed Sheeran combined. They also became the first international act to have all of their releases hit No. 1 in the country, as well as the first to hit No. 1 on both the Japanese domestic and international charts.

Some bands have used their popularity in Japan as a springboard to break into other markets. Notably, the power pop group Cheap Trick, which had been known as the "American Beatles" in Japan for their appeal, achieved widespread success with their multi-platinum live album Cheap Trick at Budokan. The band had previously struggled to break into the mainstream American market with their earlier albums. Furthermore, like Cheap Trick, some bands have lost their "big in Japan" reputations after gaining popularity in their respective homelands. The most notable example is Bon Jovi.

For example, Scorpions initially had only limited success in Europe and the United States, yet were "Big in Japan", as evidenced by their 1978 tour of the country and the double live album Tokyo Tapes.

The phrase was used as the name of a UK punk band active from 1977 to 1982 (whose name inspired the title of a 1984 hit single by the new wave band Alphaville), and was the name of the lead track on the Grammy Award-winning 1999 album Mule Variations by Tom Waits. The mockumentary This Is Spinal Tap parodies this phenomenon when the band schedules a Japanese tour after discovering that their single "Sex Farm" is inexplicably selling well there.

American singer-songwriter Billie Hughes recorded the 1991 song "Welcome to the Edge" for the soap opera Santa Barbara, but in Japan, the single became a No. 1 hit, selling over 500,000 copies and receiving Quadruple Platinum certification by the RIAJ.

In the late 20th century, notable "big in Japan" artists included several stadium rock bands from the United States, metal artists from Northern European countries such as Norway, Denmark, and especially Sweden and Finland (e.g. the rock band Hanoi Rocks), eurobeat artists from Austria, Germany and especially Italy, and UK rock artists.

Oasis consistently toured Japan during all their world tours, drawing larger crowds than in the United States or most regions outside Europe. The band's popularity in Japan was significant enough that they filmed the music video for their song "Acquiesce" with an all-Japanese cast portraying band members Noel and Liam.

After leaving Megadeth, guitarist Marty Friedman moved to Japan in 2003. There, he became a household name, with more than 600 TV appearances in 11 years and becoming a highly sought-after live and studio guitarist.

The American progressive metal band Symphony X built their early career in Japan, after signing a record contract with a now defunct Japanese company, Zero Corporation. They have since achieved success both internationally and in their home country.

Western artists have also made tributes to their Japanese fans, acknowledging and owning their "big in Japan" status: in 2014, Canadian singer-songwriter Avril Lavigne released the single "Hello Kitty", a J-pop, dubstep, and electronic dance music track which referenced the eponymous Sanrio brand and character. The song and its music video, featuring references to Japanese culture as an act of gratitude for her fanbase in the country, was positively received in Japan, despite accusations of cultural appropriation by Western commentators.

== Other usages ==
"Big in Japan" has also been used in sports, for instance, to describe Major League Baseball players who join Japanese clubs at the end of their careers, such as Daryl Spencer. Professional wrestler Stan Hansen, who had a modest career in North America, became one of the nation's most notorious gaijins in the Japanese professional wrestling scene, having become the first foreigner to defeat Antonio Inoki and Giant Baba.

The phrase also applies to films and other media. The 1984 film Streets of Fire was a box office bomb in the U.S., but it was a massive hit in Japan and won the Best Foreign Language Film award at the 1985 Kinema Junpo Awards. The film also influenced cyberpunk anime such as Megazone 23 and Bubblegum Crisis.

In 2002, Walt Disney World introduced the Disney Bear to celebrate the opening of the store Once Upon a Toy, but the teddy bear sold poorly. Two years later, executives at The Oriental Land Company, owners of Tokyo DisneySea, adopted the teddy bear and renamed it Duffy the Disney Bear, which has since become one of the most popular mascots in Japan.

"Big in Japan" has also been used to describe the popularity of the Sega Saturn, which saw huge popularity in its home region of Japan, but struggled elsewhere.

== "Small in Japan" ==
The derivative phrase "small in Japan", originally used for AC/DC, has been used since the early 1980s. In general, a small-in-Japan artist holds significant popularity in the Western world (in most cases the United States), and visits Japan many times for self-promotion, yet is almost unknown and unsuccessful in Japan despite being heavily featured by Japanese music media. An example of an internationally famous artist who is not well known in Japan is Adele.

In Japanese culture, the phrase "small in Japan" is also used to describe Japanese celebrities who are unknown, unsuccessful or "forgotten" in Japan but making their ways outside Japan. The phrase has been used to refer to musicians such as Dir En Grey, fashion models such as Ai Tominaga and Tao Okamoto, and Miss Universe contestants from Japan, most of whom are former unsuccessful fashion models, including Kurara Chibana and Riyo Mori.

Despite breaking box office records worldwide, the Marvel Cinematic Universe has struggled to perform well in Japan due to demographic incompatibilities such as character age or brand recognition, as Japanese moviegoers are more drawn into youth-oriented films such as the Harry Potter series or more established franchises such as Star Wars, Mission: Impossible, or Pirates of the Caribbean.

In one exceptional case, Digital Arts magazine has used the phrase to describe the Xbox, a video game console that was a success all over the world except in Japan. With its next console in the Xbox line, the Xbox 360, Microsoft deliberately targeted the Japanese market, but the console achieved only lukewarm success—selling just 1.62 million units in Japan (versus tens of millions in Western markets), with many retailers scaling back or discontinuing Xbox 360 stock due to underperformance.

== See also ==
- Exceptionalism
- Galápagos syndrome
- Occidentalism
- Pizza effect
- World famous in New Zealand
- Sixto Rodriguez
