= Allen Parducci =

American psychologist (1925–2023)

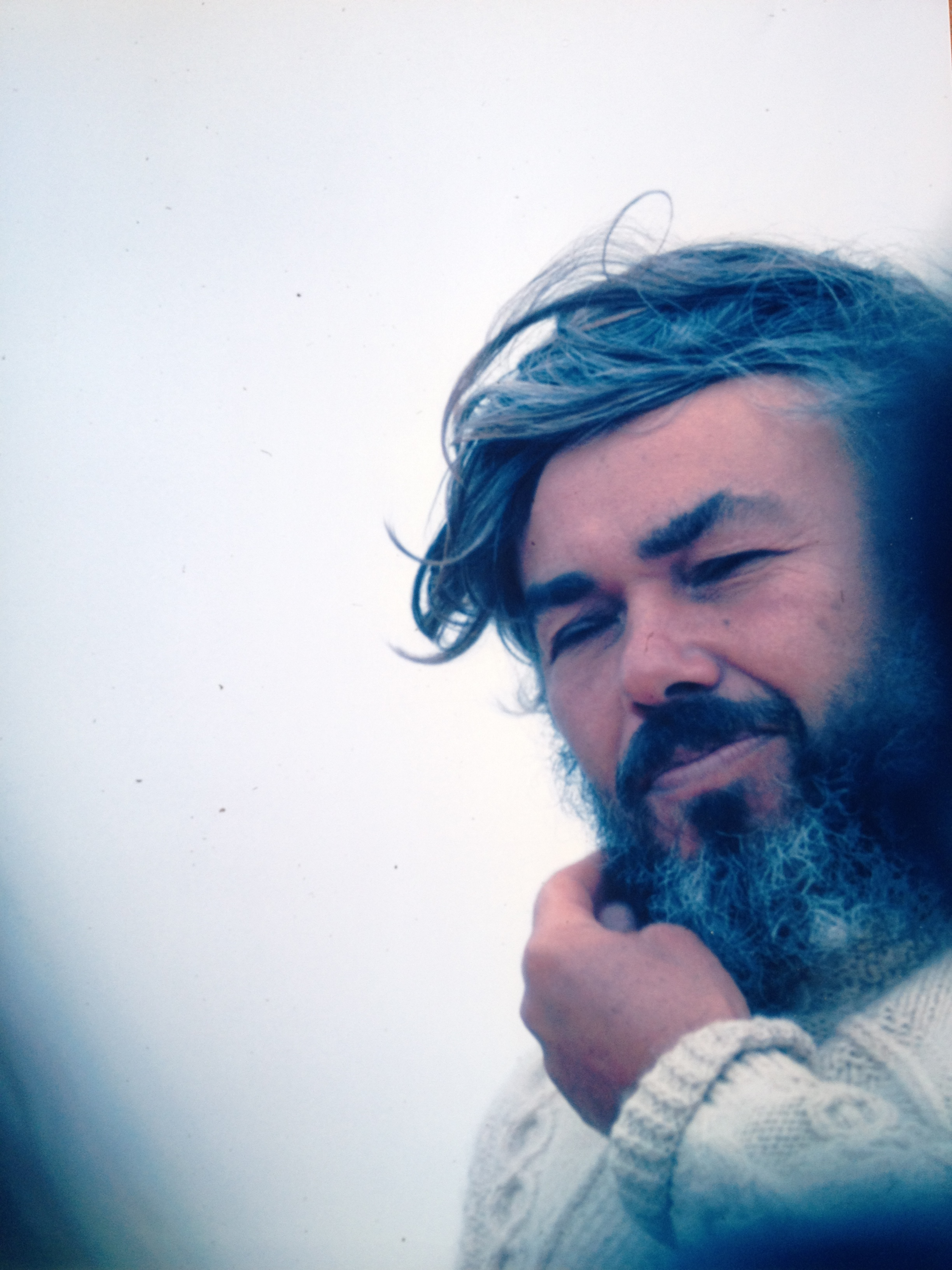
- Born: December 25, 1925
- Died: August 6, 2023 (aged 97); Los Angeles, California, U.S.
- Education: University of Michigan (BA); University of California, Berkeley (PhD)
- Occupation: Psychologist

Allen Parducci (December 25, 1925 – August 6, 2023) was an American psychologist. Educated at the University of Michigan (B.A. in Philosophy, 1949) and University of California, Berkeley (PhD in Experimental Psychology, 1954), Professor Allen Parducci started his academic career at the University of Oregon and Swarthmore College before arriving at the University of California, Los Angeles in 1957, where he became a Professor Emeritus in 1989.

Influenced by his father from a young age, Parducci said that it was his father who believed that pleasure and pain must always be balanced, an insight which would later serve to be important to the development of range–frequency theory. Parducci was an extremely influential cognitive psychologist, who conducted research on topics relating to happiness, psychophysical judgment scales, and experimental research on contextual effects. The essential idea behind his research on happiness, was, as he put it: "that the happy life is one in which the best of whatever is experienced comes relatively often".

Happiness, according to Parducci, was entirely relative. The pleasantness of any one experience of happiness depended on its relationships to a context of other experiences, real or imagined. It is not to say much, as Parducci elaborated, that the same objective achievement is less pleasant when it falls short of one's goals and more pleasant when it exceeds those goals. This is how we, as human beings, understand that happiness is relative. What is difficult, however, is to apply this relativity principle to our own lives. Range–frequency theory articulates a psychological relativism for the study of what makes one happy. Psychological experiences of pleasure and pain are internal judgments but they follow the same contextual premises that subjects adhere to when giving ratings to stimuli presented in the laboratory. At the heart of a contextual theory of happiness is the assumption that pleasantness is a judgment where the underlying dimensions are degrees of freedom. Also important to consider is the term context, defined as the conceptual representation of a set of events (real or imagined) that determine the dimensional judgment of any particular event

Parducci posited that when a stimulus is rated alongside other stimuli, its rating will depend in part on where it ranks among the stimulus set. In two influential publications, Parducci provided a more nuanced delineation of the relationship between category judgment and different features of the stimulus context. Special emphasis was given to the psychological representation of the extreme values of a given distribution. Both his 1963 Psychological Monographs and 1965 Psychological Review publications introduced the field of psychology to Range Frequency Theory.

Allen Parducci died in Pacific Palisades, California on August 6, 2023, at the age of 97.
