= World famous in New Zealand =

Advertising slogan in New Zealand

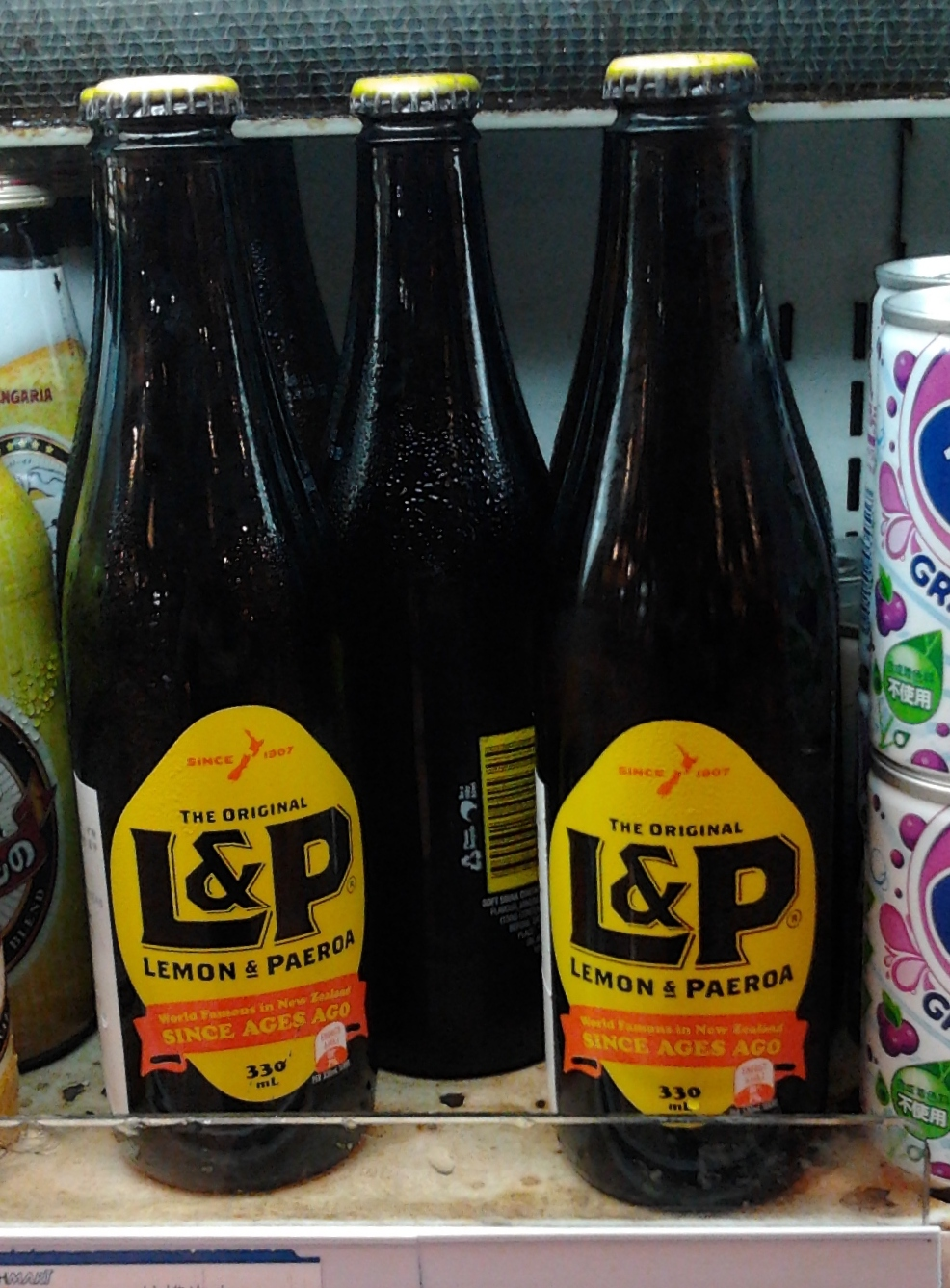
The slogan as it appears on Lemon & Paeroa bottles.

The phrase "world famous in New Zealand" is a commonly used phrase within New Zealand and the slogan of Lemon & Paeroa soft drink, coined by the British advertising agency Saatchi and Saatchi in 1993. It is used to describe items that though famous within New Zealand are unknown in the rest of the world, whereas similar items and people in larger countries would have a far higher media profile and would therefore be famous worldwide.

The term is simultaneously both parochially proud and self-deprecatingly humorous. It indicates a pride related to the expression "big fish in a small pond".

== History ==
The phrase was created by Saatchi & Saatchi Auckland, the advertising agency of Coca-Cola Amatil at the time, and came into widespread use in 1993 when it was used as the slogan for the New Zealand soft drink Lemon & Paeroa (L&P).

In 2009 Paeroa businessman Tony Coombe tried to prevent Coca-Cola Amatil from trademarking the phrase, saying it was a "Kiwi-ism" that belonged to all New Zealanders. However, an Intellectual Property Office commissioner disagreed, and when he later appealed to the High Court, the appeal was dismissed, allowing Coca-Cola Amatil to trademark the phrase.

== Other uses ==
The phrase has also been used as the title of books and a music album. In 1999 the compilation album, World Famous In New Zealand, by New Zealand rock musicians was released by Epic Records; it was sponsored by L&P with proceeds going to the Peace Foundation. Several books have used the phrase in their titles:

- World Famous in New Zealand: How New Zealand's Leading Firms Became World-Class Competitors (2001)
- Karl Wolfskehl as kiwi: a further essay on the kiwi connections in life and in death of Karl Wolfskehl, 1869-1948, the German poet world famous in New Zealand (2001)
- World famous in New Zealand (2005)
- Rodney the cat: world famous in New Zealand (2021)

The phrase inspired the title of the 18th episode of the popular show Power Rangers Dino Charge, "World Famous (in New Zealand)", which also takes place in New Zealand. Albert Smith, a tour guide and adventurer the rangers meet, also refers to himself with the phrase.

== See also ==
- New Zealand culture
- "Big in Japan"
- Big-fish–little-pond effect
- Cultural cringe
