= Greatest Hits (Klymaxx album) =

Greatest hits album by Klymaxx
- Released: 1996
- Recorded: 1984–1990
- Genre: R&B, dance
- Label: Constellation/MCA

Klymaxx chronology
One Day (1994)	Greatest Hits (1996)	20th Century Masters: The Millennium Collection (2000)

Professional ratings
Review scores
Source	Rating
Allmusic	3.5/5 stars
Robert Christgau	(choice cut)

Greatest Hits is the seventh and final album with (Constellation/MCA) by the group Klymaxx. It featured one song from group founder Bernadette Cooper's 1990 solo album Drama According to Bernadette Cooper, called "I Look Good", as well as a compilation of their greatest hits ("I Miss You", "I'd Still Say Yes", "The Men All Pause", "Meeting in the Ladies Room", "Man Size Love" and "Sexy"). This is the first greatest hits package released by Klymaxx. Another compilation was released in 2003 as part of the 20th Century Masters Millennium Collection.

== Track listing ==
1. "The Men All Pause"
2. "I Miss You"
3. "Meeting in the Ladies Room"
4. "Man Size Love"
5. "Sexy"
6. "Divas Need Love Too"
7. "Lock and Key"
8. "I'd Still Say Yes"
9. "Good Love"
10. "I Look Good"
