= Meeting in the Ladies Room =

1984 studio album by Klymaxx

- Vinyl edition

Studio album by Klymaxx
- Released: November 30, 1984
- Recorded: 1984
- Genre: Pop, R&B
- Label: Constellation/MCA
- Producer: Jimmy Jam and Terry Lewis, Stephen Shockley, Lynn Malsby, Barry DeVorzon, Joseph Conlan, Bo Watson, Vincent Calloway, Joyce "Fenderella" Irby, Bernadette Cooper

Klymaxx chronology
| Girls Will Be Girls (1982) | Meeting in the Ladies Room (1984) | Klymaxx (1986) |

Singles from Klymaxx
- 1. "The Men All Pause" Released: October 16, 1984; 2. "Meeting in the Ladies Room" Released: March 7, 1985; 3. "Lock and Key" Released: June 18, 1985; 4. "I Miss You" Released: November 4, 1985

Professional ratings
Review scores
| Source | Rating |
|---|---|
| AllMusic | 3.5/5 stars |
| Robert Christgau | B− |

Meeting in the Ladies Room is the third studio album by Klymaxx, released in 1984. In the US, it reached No. 18 on the Billboard 200 and No. 9 on the R&B album chart. It is certified Gold.

Klymaxx gained airplay on MTV, VH1 and BET with the release of their single "The Men All Pause" that reached No. 5 on the R&B chart, No. 80 on the Billboard Hot 100 and No. 9 on the Billboard Hot Dance Club Play chart. The title track reached No. 59 on the Hot 100 and No. 4 on the R&B chart. The third single, "I Miss You", reached No. 5 on the Hot 100, No. 11 on the R&B chart and No. 1 on the adult contemporary chart and was certified gold. The fourth, and final, single, "Lock and Key", reached No. 47 on the R&B chart. A young Vivica A. Fox appeared in the accompanying music video.

== Track listing ==
1. "The Men All Pause" (Cooper, Irby) - 7:10
2. "Lock and Key" (Cooper, V. Spino) - 5:37
3. "I Miss You" (Malsby) - 5:32
4. "Just Our Luck" (Joseph Conlon, Barry De Vorzon) - 4:27
5. "Meeting in the Ladies Room" (Reggie Calloway, Vincent Calloway, Bo Watson) - 5:15
6. "Video Kid" (Irby) - 3:42
7. "Ask Me No Questions" (Malsby, C. Lucas) - 3:37
8. "Love Bandit" (R. Calloway, B. Simmons, Billy C. Farlow) - 5:06
9. "I Betcha" (Irby, Malsby) - 3:36

== Singles released ==
1. "The Men All Pause"
2. "Meeting in the Ladies Room"
3. "I Miss You"
4. "Lock and Key"

== Personnel ==
- Lorena Porter Hardimon – lead vocals (2, 5–9), backing vocals (1, 2, 4–9)
- Cheryl Cooley – guitars, backing vocals (1, 2, 4–9)
- Robbin Grider – guitars, keyboards, backing vocals (1, 2, 4–9)
- Lynn Malsby – keyboards, backing vocals (1, 2, 4–9)
- Joyce "Fenderella" Irby – bass guitar, lead vocals (1, 3, 4, 6, 9), backing vocals (1, 2, 4–9)
- Bernadette Cooper – drums, percussion, lead vocals (1), backing vocals (1, 2, 4–9)

Additional Personnel

- Julia Waters – backing vocals (3)
- Maxine Waters – backing vocals (3)
- Oren Waters – backing vocals (3)

Production

- Stephen Shockley – producer (1)
- Jimmy Jam and Terry Lewis – producers (2)
- Bernadette Cooper – co-producer (2)
- Klymaxx – producers (3, 7)
- Lynn Malsby – co-producer (3, 7)
- Joseph Conlan – producer (4)
- Barry De Vorzon – producer (4)
- Vincent Calloway – producer (5, 8)
- Bo Watson – producer (5, 8)
- Reggie Calloway – associate producer (5, 8)
- Joyce "Fenderella" Irby – producer (6, 9)
- Dick Griffey – executive producer
- Dina Andrews – A&R coordination
- Regina Griffey – A&R coordination
- Brenda Patrick – A&R assistant
- Sabrina Buchanek – engineer
- Michael Carnevale – engineer
- George Doering – engineer, mixing
- Michael Frenke – engineer, mixing
- Taavi Mote – engineer, mixing
- Judy Clapp – assistant engineer
- Steve MacMillan – assistant engineer
- Steve Hodge – mixing
- Rick Probst – mixing
- Wally Traugott – mastering
- Jeff Adamoff – art direction, design
- Vartan Kurjian – art direction, design
- Darius Anthony – photography
- Mark Sokol – background photography

Studios

- Recorded at Ivar Studios and Larrabee Sound Studios (Hollywood, California); Doering Studios and Studio Masters (Los Angeles, California); Creation Studios (Minneapolis, Minnesota).
- Mixed at Larrabee Sound Studios and Soundcastle (Hollywood, California); Doering Studios (Los Angeles, California); Kendun Recorders (Burbank, California).
- Mastered at Capitol Studios (Hollywood, California).
