= Reggie Calloway =

American singer, songwriter, and record producer

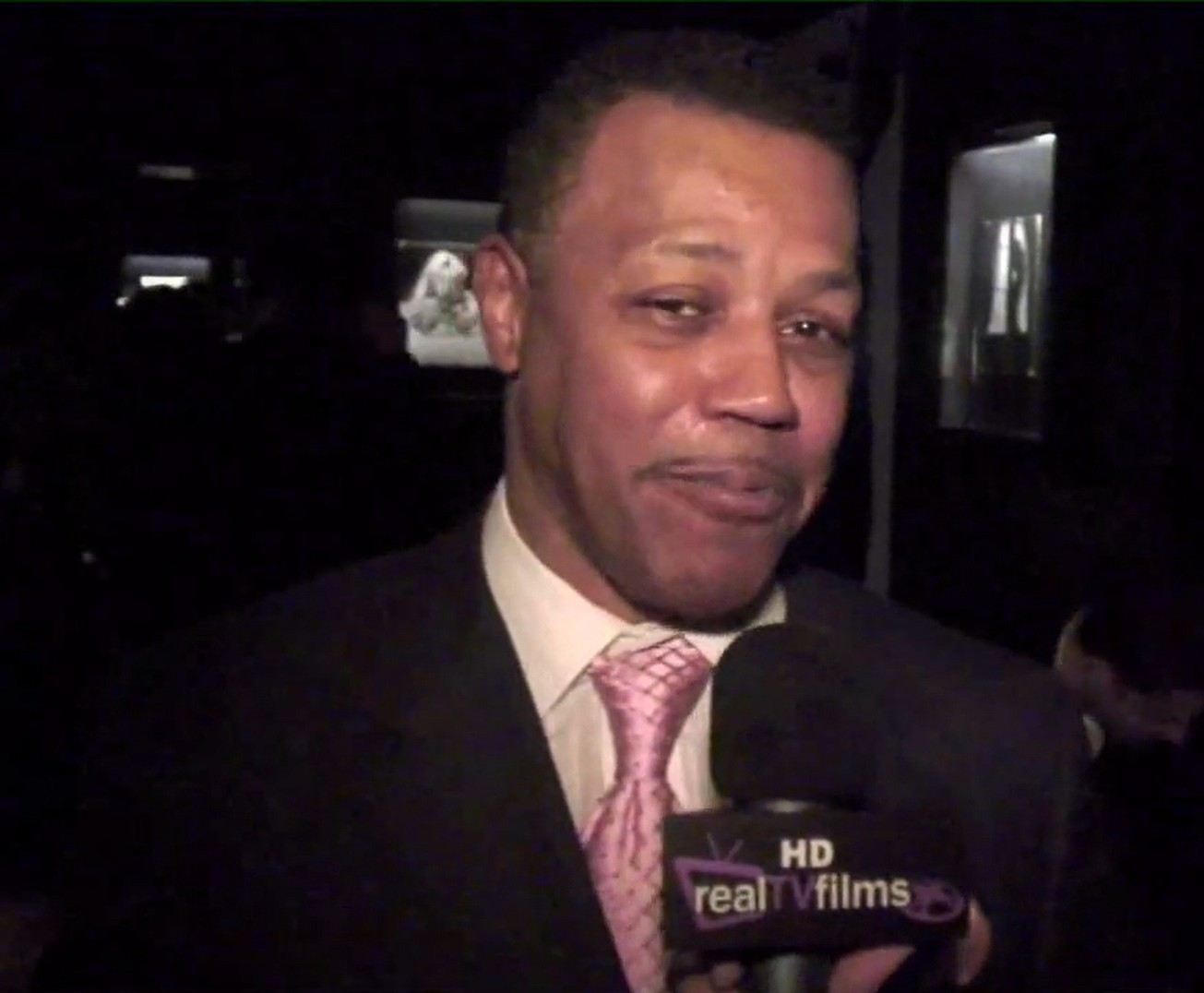
- Calloway in 2009
- Born: Reginald LeVon Calloway; January 23, 1955 (age 70); Cheyenne, Wyoming, U.S.
- Education: Kentucky State University
- Occupations: Singer; songwriter; record producer; musician; record and finance executive
- Years active: 1975–present
- Relatives: Vincent Calloway (brother); Julius Calloway (uncle)
- Musical career
- Genres: R&B; Soul; Funk; Techno Funk; Pop; Gospel; Jazz; New Jack Swing
- Labels: SOLAR; Capitol Records; Sony Music; Epic Records; RCA Records; Elektra Records; Spiral Galaxy Entertainment; Starbound
- Formerly of: Midnight Star; Sunchild
- Website: reggiecalloway.com

Reggie Calloway (born January 23, 1955) is a Grammy nominated American singer, songwriter, record producer, musician and record executive. His career spans 45 years in the entertainment industry. He rose to prominence in the late 1970s as the founder and leader of the music group, Midnight Star whose album No Parking on the Dance Floor reached #2 on Billboard's R&B Album charts and was certified Platinum X2.

Calloway later teamed up with his brother Vincent, forming the R&B duo Calloway whose single I Wanna Be Rich charted at #2 on Billboard's Pop chart. Casanova, recorded by LeVert and written and produced by Calloway, was nominated for a Grammy Award for Best Rhythm & Blues Song and charted at #1 on Billboard's R&B's chart. He has written and produced songs for Natalie Cole, NSYNC, Klymaxx, The Whispers, and Teddy Pendergrass, among others. Love Overboard, written by Calloway and recorded by Gladys Knight & the Pips, won a Grammy Award for Best R&B Performance by a Group or Duo with a Vocal. Music written and produced by Calloway has been sampled in recordings by such artists as Snoop Dogg, Warren G, Busta Rhymes, Eric B. & Rakim, E-40, Doug E. Fresh, A Lighter Shade of Brown, Usher (musician), Young MC, Sugar Ray, and numerous others.

Calloway is an avid speaker and advocate for the rights of creatives in the entertainment industry. He serves as President of the California Copyright Conference Scholarship Fund and serves on the national advisory board for the Archives of African American Music and Culture as well as serving on the board of directors at The Funk Music Hall of Fame and IAFAR. In 2022, Calloway was inducted into the Cincinnati Black Music Walk of Fame.

== Early life ==
Reginald LeVon Calloway was born to parents Irvin and Gloria (née Gilchrist) Calloway in Cheyenne, Wyoming. His father was in the Air Force, stationed at Francis E. Warren Air Force Base. His parents divorced in 1963 and his mother (Gloria) married William Larson and they moved to Cincinnati, Ohio in 1964. His mother opened her first business, Larson's Flower Barn and Ice Cream Parlor, where Calloway and his brothers Greg and Vincent worked until its closure in 1970. Calloway has two siblings, brothers Gregory and Vincent.

In Jr. High School Calloway played basketball, football, and trumpet and was his school's Student Council President. He attended Woodward High School where he played trumpet in the high school band and was Senior Class President. By the mid-1970s, the Calloway family was deeply involved in the funk and jazz scene of Cincinnati. In 1975 Reggie and brothers Vincent and Gregory, along with friends John Jones and Ruben Jordan, formed the jazz-fusion group SunChild. They released their first single on their own label, Starbound Records. During the summer of 1975, SunChild served as the back-up band for Sonny Stitt. Calloway attended Kentucky State University majoring in music theory and composition where he was Scholar of the Year, was a member of Omega Psi Phi fraternity, and was included in the, Who's Who Among Students in American Universities and Colleges book in 1977. He formed the electro-funk band Midnight Star consisting of other music students at KSU. His brother Vincent joined the group shortly afterward. To be able to focus on music full-time the band moved into Calloway's vacant grandparent's house in Louisville, Kentucky. It was during this period that the band showcased in New York and were discovered by talent scouts that would later lead to a record deal. They later moved into his mother's (Gloria) house in Cincinnati, where they lived for four years, and she became the manager of the group.

== Career ==
Reggie Calloway is a singer, songwriter, music producer, multi-instrumentalist, and owner of record label, Spiral Galaxy Entertainment, and publishing company, Calloco Music, Inc.

=== Midnight Star ===
Midnight Star was formed by Calloway in 1976 while attending Kentucky State University. The band, consisting of Calloway, Belinda Lipscomb, Melvin Gentry, Kenneth Gant, Bill Simmons, Bo Watson, and Jeff Cooper, were all students at the university. They later added non-KSU students Vincent Calloway (Reggie's younger brother) and Bobby Lovelace.

Calloway was the leader of the band, writing, arranging, and producing songs for the nine-piece ensemble. He studied hit songs on the radio, paying close attention to what DJs were spinning in the clubs and hosted listening parties for his family and friends at home. Solar Records President Dick Griffey signed the band in 1979 and helped fine-tune their sound through the first three albums. Calloway honed his production skills by shadowing songwriter/producers Leon Sylvers III and Harvey Mason in the recording studio. While speaking on the topic of the importance of mentoring, Calloway discussed an encounter he had with Quincy Jones, "The good Lord brought Quincy Jones into my life, a half hour session with Jones after his concert led to Midnight Star's breakthrough hit, “No Parking on the Dance Floor."

Calloway's use of synthesizer based beats, a fusion of R&B, funk, and pop, along with Vincent Calloway on vocoder, gave the group their signature techno-funk sound. He recorded six albums with the group, releasing such Top-10 singles as Operator, Freak-A-Zoid, and Wet My Whistle. No Parking On the Dance Floor was listed on Rolling Stone's 100 Best Singles of 1984. Calloway departed the group in 1986 with his brother Vincent to pursue other music ventures.

=== Calloway ===
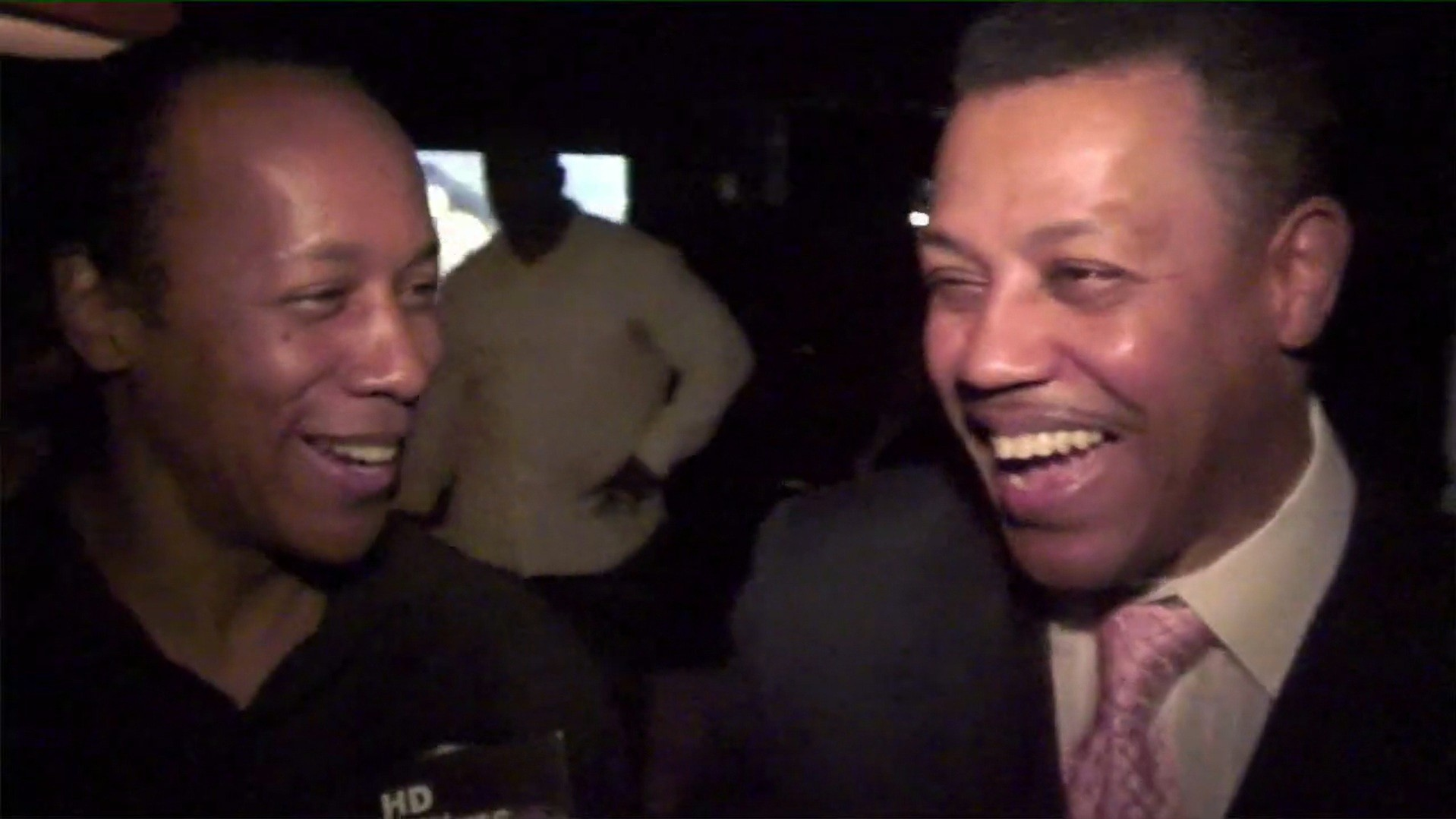
Left to right:Vincent and Reggie Calloway in 2009

Calloway, the music duo, was formed by Calloway with his brother Vincent. They released two albums, All the Way and Let's Get Smooth. Their single, I Wanna Be Rich, charted at #2 on Billboard's Pop chart as well as certifying Gold.

Calloway's self-released 2009 debut solo album, Bring Back the Love, received favorable reviews.

=== Additional singles ===
In 2017, Calloway and his brother Reggie released the charity single, Houston, after schools in Houston were badly flooded by Hurricane Harvey. Additional artists on the recording project were Walter and Wallace Scott of The Whispers and Kathy Sledge of Sister Sledge, Kevin Toney of The Blackbyrds, Freddie Washington, Brian O'Neal of The BusBoys, and Herman Jackson. All proceeds from the song were donated to the Houston Independent School District.

In 2020, the Calloways released the single, Politics, hoping to bring awareness about voting registration and voting participation. "My brother, Vincent, and I have written and recorded, “Politics,” one of the most important songs of our careers, at a time of one of the most important elections of all time," said Calloway.

Calloway provided vocals on Skip Martin's 2021 charity single, People Get Ready, along with artists Stevie Wonder, Ray Parker Jr., Taylor Dayne, and Howard Hewett, among others. All proceeds were donated to the St. Jude Children’s Research Hospital. The single has been compared to, We Are the World, and charted at #1 the World Indie Music Charts in 2022.

=== Writing and producing ===
Dick Griffey, the President and owner of SOLAR Records, who had signed Midnight Star, asked Calloway and the band if they knew of any other talented groups in the Ohio area. Calloway and Midnight star had signed the music group, The Deele, to their production company Mid-Star (which included band members Kenny Babyface Edmunds and LA Reid). Calloway pitched the band to Griffey which led to him signing the group. "He signed them unheard based on our reputation, but they had the music to back it up," recalled Calloway. He produced their 1983 album, Street Beat, containing the #2 single Body Talk, as well as co-writing singles, Street Beat and Video Villain.

While still writing, producing and performing in Midnight Star, Calloway continued producing and writing for other artists. In the early 1980s he also co-produced, Radio Activity by Royalcash and co-wrote and produced singles, Contagious and Never Too Late for The Whispers. In 1985 he co-wrote the title track for Klymaxx's album Meeting in the Ladies Room and co-produced Hello Stranger for Carrie Lucas.

By the mid-1980s, Calloway had become a prominent writer and producer for other artists. In 1987 his song, Jump Start, recorded by Natalie Cole was said by the press to have literally "jump started" her music career and Love Overboard, written by Calloway and recorded by Gladys Knight & the Pips, won a Grammy Award for Best R&B Performance by a Group or Duo with a Vocal as well as being listed as one of their Top 10 Hits. Atlantic Records brought him in on LeVert's album project resulting in Calloway writing and producing, Casanova, which earned Calloway a Grammy nomination for Best R&B Song and LeVert a nomination for Best R&B Performance by a Duo or Group with a Vocal.

In 1988, Calloway wrote and produced the #1 single, Joy, recorded by Teddy Pendergrass and in 1993, Believe in Love, both of which made the Teddy Pendergrass Top 10 Songs by Classic Rock History. Pendergrass also recorded Happy Kwanzaa, Having a Christmas Party, and I Won't Have Christmas (all written and produced by Calloway), which were released on his 1998 holiday album, This Christmas (I'd Rather Have Love).

=== Other ventures ===
Calloway was instrumental in developing options for artists to receive advances without giving up ownership of their creative works. He serves as the Director of Music Royalty Funding at Sound Royalties and was the co-founder and co-owner of the Royalty Exchange.

== Singles ==
Year	Song	Artist	Credit
1983	Freak-A-Zoid	Midnight Star	Writer, vocals, musician, producer, music arranger
1983	Radio Activity	Royalcash	Co-producer
1984	No Parking On the Dance Floor	Midnight Star	Vocals, musician, producer, music arranger
1984	Operator	Midnight Star	Writer, musician, producer, music arranger
1984	Body Talk	The Deele	Producer, vocal and music arranger
1984	Contagious	The Whispers	Writer, producer
1984	Never Too Late	The Whispers	Writer, producer
1985	Meeting in the Ladies Room	Klymaxx	Writer, co-producer, musician, music arranger
1985	Some Kinda Lover	The Whispers	Producer
1985	Hello Stranger	Carrie Lucas	Co-producer
1985	Scientific Love	Midnight Star	Writer, musician, producer, music arranger
1986	Midas touch	Midnight Star	Writer, musician, producer, music arranger
1986	Headlines	Midnight Star	Writer, vocals, musician, producer, music arranger
1986	Engine No. 9	Midnight Star	Writer, musician, producer, music arranger
1987	Jump Start	Natalie Cole	Writer, musician, producer, music arranger
1987	Casanova	LeVert	Writer, musician, producer, music arranger
1987	Love Overboard	Gladys Knight & the Pips	Writer, musician, producer, music arranger
1988	Joy	Teddy Pendergrass	Writer, vocals, musician, producer, music arranger
1989	I Wanna Be Rich	Calloway	Writer, vocals, musician, producer, music arranger
1990	All the Way	Calloway	Writer, vocals, musician, producer, music arranger
1990	Sir Lancelot	Calloway	Writer, vocals, musician, producer, music arranger
1991	Elevator	Sweet Obsession	Writer, producer
1992	Let's Get Smooth	Calloway	Writer, vocals, musician, producer, music arranger
1993	Believe in Love	Teddy Pendergrass	Writer, musician, producer, music arranger
1994	Let's Get Smooth (Jam's Remix)	Calloway ft. Pieces of a Dream	Writer, vocals, musician, producer, music arranger
1998	Happy Kwanzaa	Teddy Pendergrass	Writer, vocals, musician, producer, music arranger, engineer
2000	I'll Be Good For You	NSYNC	Writer
2009	Bring Back the Love	Reggie Calloway	Writer, vocals, musician, producer, music arranger
2017	Houston	Reggie Calloway, Vincent Calloway (and various artists)	Writer, vocals, musician, producer, music arranger
2017	People Get Ready	Skip Martin (and various artists)	Vocals, engineer
2020	Politics	Reggie and Vincent Calloway	Writer, vocals, musician, producer, music arranger, engineer
2021	Sabrina	Reggie Calloway	Writer, vocals, musician, producer, music arranger
2024	I Wanna Be Rich (Anniversary)	Reggie and Vincent Calloway	Writer, vocals, musician
2025	Freak-A-Zoid (Reboot)	Reggie and Vincent Calloway	Writer, vocals, musician, producer
2025	6 Pack	Reggie and Vincent Calloway	Writer, vocals, musician, producer

== Singles Billboard Chart ==
Year	Single	Peak chart positions				
Year	Single	US R&B	US Hot 100	US Dance	NLD	UK
1983	Freak-A-Zoid	1	18	15	—	―
1983	Radioactivity	39	—	—	—	—
1983	Wet My Whistle	8	61	15	—	60
1984	Operator	1	18	15	—	63
1984	No Parking On the Dance Floor	43	81	44	—	—
1984	Body Talk	3	77	—	—	—
1984	Contagious	10	—	59	—	56
1985	Meeting in the Ladies Room	4	59	22	—	—
1985	Some Kinda Lover	17	—	—	—	91
1985	Hello Stranger	24	—	—	—	—
1985	Scientific Love	16	80	19	—	—
1986	Midas Touch	7	42	―	29	8
1986	Headlines	3	69	34	—	16
1986	Engine No. 9	11	—	―	81	64
1987	Jump Start	2	—	―	—	—
1987	Casanova	1	5	27	—	9
1987	Love Overboard	1	13	―	—	—
1988	Joy	1	77	42	—	—
1988	Believe in Love	14	―	―	—	—
1988	Don't Rock the Boat	3	―	―	36	—
1989	I Wanna Be Rich	5	2	―	—	100
1990	All the Way	39	63	―	—	—
1990	Sir Lancelot	19	—	―	—	—
1991	Elevator	74		―	—	—
1992	Let's Get Smooth	33	—	―	—	—
2000	"I'll Be Good For You"	—	—	―	—	—
"—" denotes releases that did not chart or were not released.

== Discography ==
Year	Album	Artist	Credit
1980	The Beginning	Midnight Star	Writer, vocals, musician, music arranger, producer
1981	Standing Together	Midnight Star	Writer, vocals, musician, music arranger, producer
1982	Victory	Midnight Star	Writer, vocals, musician, music arranger, producer
1983	No Parking on the Dance Floor	Midnight Star	Writer, vocals, musician, music arranger, producer
1984	Planetary Invasion	Midnight Star	Writer, vocals, musician, music arranger, producer
1984	Street Beat	The Deele	Writer, musician, producer, music and vocal arrangement
1986	Headlines	Midnight Star	Writer, vocals, musician, music arranger, producer
1989	All the Way	Calloway	Writer, vocals, musician, music arranger, producer
1992	Let's Get Smooth	Calloway	Writer, vocals, musician, music arranger, producer
2009	Bring Back the Love	Reggie Calloway	Writer, vocals, musician, music arranger, producer

== Billboard Album Chart ==
Year	Album	Peak chart positions					Certifications (sales thresholds)	Record label
Year	Album	US Pop	US R&B	NLD	NZ	UK	Certifications (sales thresholds)	Record label
1980	"The Beginning"	—	—	—	—	—		SOLAR
1981	Standing Together	—	54	—	—	—		SOLAR
1982	Victory	205	58	—	—	—		SOLAR
1983	No Parking on the Dance Floor	27	2	—	30	—	RIAA: 2× Platinum	SOLAR
1984	Planetary Invasion	32	7	—	44	85	RIAA: Gold	SOLAR
1984	Street Beat	78	9	—	—	—		SOLAR
1986	Headlines	56	7	—	—	—	RIAA: Gold	SOLAR
1989	All the Way	63	—	—	—	—		Epic
1992	Let's Get Smooth	42	89	—	—	—		SOLAR
"—" denotes a recording that did not chart or was not released in that territory.
