= In the Pursuit of Leisure =

Studio album by Sugar Ray
- Released: June 3, 2003
- Recorded: 2002–2003
- Studios: Henson Studios, Hollywood, California
- Genre: Pop rock
- Length: 41:06
- Label: Atlantic
- Producer: David Kahne

Sugar Ray chronology
Sugar Ray (2001)	In the Pursuit of Leisure (2003)	The Best of Sugar Ray (2005)

Singles from In the Pursuit of Leisure
- 1. "Mr. Bartender (It's So Easy)" Released: April 28, 2003; 2. "Is She Really Going Out With Him?" Released: 2003

In the Pursuit of Leisure is the fifth studio album by American rock band Sugar Ray, released on June 3, 2003. Singer-songwriter Esthero and reggae singer Shaggy both make guest appearances.

It features the single "Mr. Bartender (It's So Easy)", which was a modest success and reached the #20 spot on Billboard's Adult Top 40. A cover of Joe Jackson's new wave song "Is She Really Going Out With Him?" was released as the second single. It had similar success and reached the #29 spot on Billboard's Adult Top 40. It was their last studio album to be released through Atlantic Records and Warner, with the band departing the label in 2006, following the release of a greatest hits record.

== Background ==
The album marked the return of David Kahne as sole producer, with Kahne having previously produced Sugar Ray's multi-platinum releases Floored (1997) and 14:59 (1999). He only served as a co-producer on Sugar Ray's self-titled 2001 album, which was primarily handled by Don Gilmore. The single "Is She Really Going Out With Him?" was originally released by Joe Jackson in 1978, when all the members were still only between the ages of 8 and 11. The idea to cover the song came in 2000, from John Rubeli, who worked at Atlantic Records. He came across "Is She Really Going Out With Him?" and thought that Jackson sounded similar to McGrath in it, which led to him suggesting that Sugar Ray do a cover. It took him some time to get this idea out to the band, which is why it didn't appear on their self-titled album. McGrath said in 2003 that his band were still fans of Joe Jackson and other new wave musicians, despite not being the ones who thought of covering him. He said, "all those great songs from the '80s, be it from Duran Duran or Adam Ant or Joe Jackson, they were part of the soundtrack to our lives growing up." Sugar Ray had previously covered the 1981 new wave song "Stand and Deliver" by Adam and the Ants, with it appearing on their second album Floored.

=== Artwork ===
The back of the album features a photograph of a chimpanzee, which is wearing a baseball cap with the phrase "word!" on it. This chimpanzee is also in a group shot with the band in the album's booklet. The back of the album shows the song titles as if they were a digital menu with a programming guide for what was on television for the date of Saturday, October 24.

== Music ==
It has been labelled a pop rock album, and features elements of acoustic pop, electronic music, heavy metal, hip hop, new wave, reggae and sketch comedy. AllMusic considered it be a continuation of the style of their last album, but describe it as having more of a modern, contemporary sound than that record did. The cover of "Is She Really Going Out With Him?" incorporates electronic sounds from DJ Homicide, which bassist Murphy Karges described as being "goofy keyboard parts", and also has a string section. According to Karges, the band weren't fans of the goofy direction David Kahne took the song in, and they preferred a more raw and straightforward version of the song that was performed live. The single "Mr. Bartender (It's So Easy)" is a mixture of pop, heavy metal and hip hop. It includes samples from both Sweet's hit "Love Is Like Oxygen" and Midnight Star's hit "No Parking (On the Dance Floor)." The demo version of the song was built around the riff from "Love Is Like Oxygen" and hip hop beats, with the band being pleased with this early version. The direction of the song shifted when David Kahne got involved, since Kahne wanted to turn it into another radio hit like "Fly", "Every Morning" or "When It's Over". Originally, the band were considering "Chasin' You Around" as a single, instead of "Mr. Bartender (It's So Easy)". The lyrics to "Chasin' You Around" were inspired by guitarist Rodney Sheppard's son, who was a toddler at the time.

The album features a short comedic skit titled "Bring Me the Head of...", which only has an acoustic guitar playing in the background. The voice on the track is from Matty Baratto, a guitar technician and builder who had been part of Sugar Ray's live crew for many years. It is reminiscent of the track "Drive By" from their debut Lemonade and Brownies, which was another short comedic skit. In 2019, Karges labelled the closing track "Blues from a Gun" as "beautiful" and "interesting", saying that it didn't sound like anything else on the rest of the record. Roughly 2 minutes into the song, the sound changes and it incorporates a string section, with the latter parts of the song having originated through Kahne. The title came from McGrath and is a reference to the 1989 song of the same name, by British alternative rock band The Jesus & Mary Chain. AllMusic said the song's sound was "pretty much the polar opposite" of The Jesus & Mary Chain. Like on Floored and subsequent releases, the album incorporates elements of reggae music, with this style being heard on the tracks "Heaven" and "56 Hope Road". The latter track was written as a tribute to reggae musician Bob Marley, and the title is a reference to a street in Jamaica where a Bob Marley museum is located. Karges said he considered the song's sound to be a cross between reggae and The Beatles. "In Through the Doggie Door" is one of the more rock-oriented songs on the album, with Karges describing its sound as "psycho Neil Young". The band's goal with the track was to make a "messy" song with loud electric guitars, since several of the songs on the album used acoustic guitars. Karges described "She's Different" as having a "bouncy" sound, and said it was one of several songs the band wrote which they knew weren't singles, but which also weren't "terrible" either.

== Touring ==
To support the album in the summer of 2003, Sugar Ray embarked on a month long American tour with Michelle Branch, The Goo-Goo Dolls and Uncle Kracker. Sugar Ray had previously done American tours with The Goo-Goo Dolls and Uncle Kracker in 1999 and 2001. In 2003, they also shared bills with Franky Perez, Matchbox Twenty, Maroon 5, Tony C. and the Truth and Trapt, among others.

== Release and commercial response ==
In the Pursuit of Leisure sold 135,000 copies, far less than the band's prior self-titled release, which had gone gold. However, the sales were still higher than the band's 1995 debut Lemonade and Brownies, which had sold only 48,000 copies upon release.

The album's commercial failure led to a six-year gap in releasing their next album, Music for Cougars. In 2004, McGrath got a role as host of entertainment news program Extra, and the band started only playing a few shows a year up until their comeback with Music for Cougars. McGrath reflected in 2009 that the pop radio scene was starting to shift at that time, saying "the Ushers and Lil Jons were moving in and I'm like, 'you know what, man? You've had a great run this first wave; let's see what else is going on'." A few months after the album was released, it was announced that a group of private investors were purchasing Warner Music Group (parent of Atlantic Records) from AOL Time Warner, primarily due to the huge debt which had been created through the recent merger of AOL and Time Warner. Under the new ownership, Atlantic/Warner released a greatest hits album for the band in 2005, titled The Best of Sugar Ray. They departed the label afterwards, with Music for Cougars being released on independent label Pulse.

== Reception ==
Professional ratings
Aggregate scores
Source	Rating
Metacritic	68/100
Review scores
Source	Rating
AllMusic	4/5 stars
Blender	3/5 stars
Entertainment Weekly	B−
E!	B−
Melodic	3/5 stars
Now	1/5 stars
Q	4/5 stars
Rolling Stone	2/5 stars
Slant Magazine	2.5/5 stars
Spin	B

Stephen Thomas Erlewine of AllMusic called it "another winning record by a band who has proven to be far more resilient than anybody could have guessed when 'Fly' flew to the top of the charts in 1997." Entertainment Weekly gave it a B− rating, saying that "nothing on this album is good for you, but you may find its saccharine charms difficult to resist."

Rolling Stone's Pat Blashill had a more negative review, saying that "Sugar Ray are a synthesis of everything that's dumb about pop music; like Prell shampoo, they make you feel bouncy, resilient and full of pep." Blashill also labelled the single "Mr. Bartender (It's So Easy)" as "a metal-pop song with a gratuitously silly rap chorus." Sal Cinquemani of Slant Magazine also had a negative review in 2003, saying that "Sugar Ray’s 1999 album 14:59 was such a blatant, no-apologies capitalist cash-in it was difficult not to admire it. But after their carbon copy self-titled follow-up, and now In the Pursuit of Leisure, their fifth album, Sugar Ray just seem downright lazy." He added that, "Sugar Ray has built an entire career out of creating summer anthems and now it seems they’re just treading pool water. The album, perhaps more appropriately titled In the Pursuit of Absolutely Nothing, is breezy and inviting but utterly unchallenging—for both the band and its audience."

In July 2003, Spin praised the band's hooks but said that McGrath is "too handsome to really sell the unlucky in love songs he writes". They claimed "Is She Really Going Out With Him?" wasn't a believable song for McGrath to be singing, and added that the band's self-deprecating humor "still rings hollow" like on previous releases.

== Track listing ==
No.	Title	Writer(s)	Length
1.	"Chasin' You Around"	DJ Homicide; Rodney Sheppard; Mark McGrath; Murphy Karges; David Kahne	3:38
2.	"Is She Really Going Out with Him?" (Joe Jackson cover)	Joe Jackson	3:48
3.	"Heaven"	Stan Frazier; McGrath; Steve Fox; Kahne	4:26
4.	"Bring Me the Head of..."	Sugar Ray; Matty Baratto	0:42
5.	"Mr. Bartender (It's So Easy)"	Sugar Ray; Simon McKinley; Kahne	3:30
6.	"Can't Start"	Frazier; McGrath; Sheppard; DJ Homicide; Kahne	3:42
7.	"Photograph of You"	Frazier; Karges; McGrath; Sheppard; Kahne	3:48
8.	"56 Hope Road" (featuring Shaggy)	DJ Homicide; McGrath; Sheppard; Kahne; Shaggy	3:51
9.	"Whatever We Are"	Frazier; Karges; McGrath; Sheppard; Kahne	3:41
10.	"She's Different"	McGrath; Sheppard; Frazier; Kahne	3:30
11.	"In Through the Doggie Door"	Karges; McGrath; Sheppard; Kahne	3:09
12.	"Blues from a Gun"	McGrath; Sheppard; Frazier; Karges; Kahne	3:25

Sample credits

- "Chasin' You Around" samples "Flying in the USA", written by Caleb Quaye.
- "Mr. Bartender (It's So Easy)":
  - contains excerpts from "Love Is Like Oxygen", written by Andrew Scott and Trevor Griffin, as performed by Sweet.
  - embodies portions of "No Parking (On the Dance Floor)", written by Vincent Calloway, Bobby Lovelace, William Simmons.

== Personnel ==
Sugar Ray

- Mark McGrath – lead vocals, guitars
- Rodney Sheppard – guitars, backing vocals
- Stan Frazier – drums, guitars, backing vocals
- Murphy Karges – bass
- Craig "DJ Homicide" Bullock – turntables, backing vocals, additional programming

Additional musicians

- Esthero – additional vocals on "Heaven"
- ProHoeZak – additional vocals on "Mr. Bartender (It's So Easy)"
- Shaggy – additional vocals on "56 Hope Road"

Technical personnel

- David Kahne – producer, programming, mixing, engineer
- Massif (Stan Frazier and Steve Fox) – additional production on "Heaven"
- Michael Brauer – mixing
- Rob Brill – engineer
- Steve Gallagher – additional engineering
- Steve Duda – additional engineering
- Kevin Mills – assistant engineer
- Alex Uychocde – assistant mix engineer
- Stephen Marcussen – mastering

== Charts ==
Chart (2003)	Peak position
US Billboard 200	29
