= Everlasting (Natalie Cole album) =

Studio album by Natalie Cole
- Released: June 14, 1987
- Recorded: 1986–1987
- Studio: Conway Studios, Soundcastle and Ocean Way Recording (Hollywood, California); Larrabee Sound Studios, One On One Studios and Entourage Studios (North Hollywood, California); Lion Share Studios, Studio 55 and Image Recording Studios (Los Angeles, California); Encore Studios and O'Henry Sound Studios (Burbank, California); Fifth Floor Recording Studios (Cincinnati, Ohio); House of Music (West Orange, New Jersey); Messina Music and Right Track Recording (New York City, New York)
- Genre: R&B; pop
- Length: 54:28
- Label: Manhattan (Original release); Elektra (1991 re–release)
- Producer: Jerry Knight; Aaron Zigman; Reggie Calloway; Vincent Calloway; Dennis Lambert; Burt Bacharach; Carole Bayer Sager; Marcus Miller; Eddie Cole; Natalie Cole; Andy Goldmark; Bruce Roberts

Natalie Cole chronology
Dangerous (1985)	Everlasting (1987)	Good to Be Back (1989)

Alternative cover
- UK edition

Singles from Everlasting
- 1. "Jumpstart" Released: 1987; 2. "I Live for Your Love" Released: November 1987; 3. "Pink Cadillac" Released: February 1988; 4. "When I Fall In Love" Released: 1988

Professional ratings
Review scores
Source	Rating
AllMusic	3/5 stars

Everlasting is the eleventh studio album by American singer Natalie Cole, released on June 14, 1987 by Manhattan Records. The album was certified gold by the Recording Industry Association of America (RIAA). Cole earned a nomination for Best Female R&B Vocal Performance at the 1988 Grammy Awards.

== Production ==
The duo The Calloways contributed to the tracks "Jump Start", a cover of Bruce Springsteen's "Pink Cadillac", and "I Live for Your Love". Also included are the Bacharach and Bayer Sager songs "In My Reality" and "Split Decision". A cover of "When I Fall in Love" and "More Than the Stars" features José Feliciano on vocals and guitar.

== Commercial reception ==
Released in June 1987, Everlasting peaked at the No. 8 on US Top R&B Albums, No. 42 on the Billboard 200, and No. 9 on New Zealand Albums chart. Its lead single "Jump Start" hit No. 2 on US R&B Songs chart and No. 13 on the US Hot 100. The second single, "I Live for Your Love", was a top 5 hit on the US R&B and Adult Contemporary chart.

"Pink Cadillac" was released as the third single and a top 5 on the Hot 100, top 10 on R&B Songs and topped the US Dance Songs chart. It hit top 5 in the UK, New Zealand, Ireland, Switzerland, Germany and top 10 in Denmark, Finland, and Australia.

== Track listing ==
No.	Title	Writer(s)	Producer(s)	Length
1.	"Everlasting"	Jerry Knight; Aaron Zigman	Knight; Zigman	5:17
2.	"Jump Start"	Reggie Calloway; Vincent Calloway	R. Calloway; V. Calloway	6:26
3.	"The Urge to Merge"	Pam Reswick; Steve Werfel	Dennis Lambert	4:10
4.	"Split Decision"	Burt Bacharach; Carole Bayer Sager	Andy Goldmark; Bruce Roberts	4:14
5.	"When I Fall in Love"	Edward Heyman; Victor Young	Marcus Miller	5:09
6.	"Pink Cadillac"	Bruce Springsteen	Lambert; Paul Jackson Jr.	4:28
7.	"I Live for Your Love"	Reswick; Allan Rich; Werfel	Lambert	4:29
8.	"In My Reality"	Bacharach; Sager	Goldmark; Roberts	5:21
9.	"I'm the One"	R. Calloway; Belinda Lipscomb	R. Calloway; V. Calloway	5:21
10.	"More Than the Stars"	Natalie Cole; Eddie Cole	N. Cole; E. Cole	4:39
11.	"What I Must Do" (1991 CD reissue)	Goldmark; Roberts	Goldmark; Roberts	4:52
Total length:				54:28

== Personnel ==
- Natalie Cole – lead vocals (1–8, 10, 11), all vocals (9)
- Aaron Zigman – all instruments (1)
- Jerry Knight – all instruments (1)
- Joel Davis – keyboards (2, 9)
- Odeen Mays Jr. – keyboards (2, 9)
- David Ervin – keyboard programming (2), synthesizer programming (2), drum programming (2), keyboards (9)
- Claude Gaudette – keyboards (3, 6, 7)
- Randy Kerber – keyboards (4, 8)
- Burt Bacharach – synthesizers (4, 8)
- Nat Adderley Jr. – keyboards (5)
- Jeff Bova – synthesizer programming (5)
- Charles Floyd – acoustic piano (10), synthesizers (10)
- David Joyce – synthesizers (10)
- Greg Phillinganes – keyboards (11)
- Andy Goldmark – additional keyboards (11)
- Bruce Roberts – additional keyboards (11)
- Gene Robinson – guitars (2, 9)
- Dann Huff – guitars (3, 4, 8)
- Ira Siegel – guitars (5)
- Paul Jackson Jr. – guitars (6, 7, 11), rhythm guitar (10)
- José Feliciano – acoustic guitar (10), hand and mouth percussion (10), spontaneous vocals (10)
- Marcus Miller – bass (3, 5), guitars (5)
- Neil Stubenhaus – bass (4, 6–8, 11)
- Abraham Laboriel – bass (10)
- Carlos Vega – drums (4)
- Buddy Williams – drums (5)
- Mike Baird – drums (6, 7)
- John Robinson – drums (8, 10, 11)
- Lenny Castro – percussion (3)
- Paulinho da Costa – percussion (4, 11)
- Shandu Akiem – percussion (9)
- Steve Samuel – percussion (10)
- Larry Williams – saxophone solo (1), synthesizers (4, 8)
- Tom Scott – saxophone (3)
- David Boruff – saxophone solo (4, 8)
- Kenny G – alto sax solo (5)
- Jerry Hey – trumpet (8), flugelhorn (8)

Music arrangements

- Reggie Calloway – arrangements (2, 9)
- Claude Gaudette – arrangements (3, 7)
- Nat Adderley Jr. – arrangements (5)
- Paul Jackson Jr. – arrangements (6)
- Jerry Hey – horn arrangements (8)
- Eddie Cole – rhythm arrangements (9)
- Chase/Rucker Productions – flute and string arrangements (10)

Background vocalists

- Natalie Cole – backing vocals (2, 5–8, 11)
- Eddie Cole – backing vocals (2)
- Katrina Perkins – backing vocals (2)
- Stephanie Spruill – backing vocals (4)
- Julia Waters Tillman – backing vocals (4, 7)
- Maxine Waters Willard – backing vocals (4, 7)
- David Joyce – backing vocals (5)
- Siedah Garrett – backing vocals (7)
- Mendy Lee – backing vocals (7)
- Oren Waters – backing vocals (7)
- Phillip Ingram – backing vocals (8)
- Joe Pizzulo – backing vocals (8)
- The "N" Sisters – backing vocals (10)

Production

- Gerry Griffith – executive producer
- Jerry Knight – producer (1)
- Aaron Zigman – producer (1)
- Reggie Calloway – producer (2, 9)
- Vincent Calloway – co-producer (2, 9)
- Dennis Lambert – producer (3, 6, 7)
- Burt Bacharach – producer (4, 8)
- Carole Bayer-Sager – producer (4, 8)
- Marcus Miller– producer (5)
- Paul Jackson Jr. – associate producer (6)
- Eddie Cole – producer (10)
- Natalie Cole – producer (10)
- Andy Goldmark – producer (11)
- Bruce Roberts – producer (11)
- Marrianne Pellicci – production assistant (3, 6, 7)
- Bibi Green – production coordinator (5)
- Debra Bishop – design
- Koppel & Scher – design
- The Cream Group – cover design, layout (UK release)
- Moshe Brakha – photography
- Matthew Rolston – cover photography (UK release)
- Emory Jones – hair
- Wendy Cooper – make-up
- Cecille Parker – stylist
- Dan Cleary – management

Technical credits

- Mick Guzauski – recording (1, 4, 8), mixing (1, 4, 8)
- Craig Burbidge – recording (2, 9)
- Paul Ericksen – recording (2, 9), assistant engineer (6)
- Glen Holguin – recording (2, 9)
- Robin Jenny – recording (2, 9)
- Jim Krause – recording (2, 9)
- Taavi Mote – recording (2, 9), mixing (2, 9)
- Gabe Veltri – recording (2, 9)
- Jeremy Smith – recording (3, 6, 7), mixing (3, 6, 7)
- Bruce Miller – engineer (5)
- Ed Thacker – engineer (5)
- Ray Bardani – mixing (5)
- Mark Wolfson – engineer (10), mixing (10)
- Eddie Cole – mixing (10)
- Natalie Cole – mixing (10)
- Alan Gregory – engineer (11)
- Glen Holguin – engineer (11)
- Barney Perkins – engineer (11), mixing (11)
- Tom Perry – additional recording (4, 8)
- Tommy Vicari – additional recording (4, 8)
- Gary Wagner – assistant engineer (1, 4), mixing (8)
- Sabrina Buchanek – assistant engineer (2, 9)
- John Hegedes – assistant engineer (2, 9)
- Jeff Lorenzen – assistant engineer (2, 9)
- Elmer Slores – assistant engineer (2, 9)
- Tony Spataro – assistant engineer (2, 9)
- Liz Cluse – assistant engineer (3, 7)
- Ron DaSilva – assistant engineer (3)
- Marnie Riley – assistant engineer (4), recording (8), mixing (8)
- Clark Germain – assistant engineer (5)
- Bruce Gisoni – assistant engineer (5)
- Paul Huggins – assistant engineer (5)
- Bill Miranda – assistant engineer (5)
- Neil Nappe – assistant engineer (5)
- Bino Espinoza – assistant engineer (6), recording (7)
- Kathy Botich – assistant engineer (10)
- Sean Stancioff – assistant engineer (10), mixing (10)

== Charts ==
=== Weekly charts ===
Chart (1987–1988)	Peak position
Australian Albums (ARIA)	68
New Zealand Albums (RMNZ)	9
UK Albums (OCC)	62
US Billboard 200	42
US Top R&B/Hip-Hop Albums (Billboard)	8

=== Year-end charts ===
Chart (1988)	Position
US Billboard 200	77
US Top R&B/Hip-Hop Albums (Billboard)	7

== Certifications and sales ==
Region	Certification	Certified units/sales
New Zealand (RMNZ)	Gold	7,500^{^}
United Kingdom (BPI)	Silver	60,000^{^}
United States (RIAA)	Gold	500,000^{^}
^{^} Shipments figures based on certification alone.
