= Engine No. 9 =

Engine No. 9 can refer to:

- Engine Engine Number 9, a 1965 country music song by Roger Miller
- "(Get Me Back On Time) Engine Number 9", a 1970 song by Wilson Pickett on the album Wilson Pickett In Philadelphia
- "Engine No. 9", a 1986 song by the R&B group Midnight Star on their album Headlines
- "Engine No. 9", a 1995 song by the metal band Deftones on the album Adrenaline (album)
