= Street Beat (album) =

Studio album by The Deele
- Released: 1983
- Recorded: 1983 at OCA Recording Studio (Cincinnati, Ohio) and Larrabee Sound Studios (Los Angeles, California)
- Genre: R&B, post-disco, synth-funk
- Length: 41:12
- Label: SOLAR, Elektra/Asylum, Warner Bros.
- Producer: Reggie Calloway

The Deele chronology
Street Beat (1983)	Material Thangz (1985)

Street Beat is the debut album by The Deele.

== Reception ==
Professional ratings
Review scores
Source	Rating
Allmusic	3/5 stars

Released in 1983 on the SOLAR Records label, which was distributed by Elektra/Asylum Records. It was produced by Midnight Star member Reggie Calloway. This album included The Deele's first big hit, "Body Talk," which reached #3 on the R&B chart.

== Track listing ==
1. "Body Talk" (Watson, Greene, Reid, Gentry, Burke) 5:36
2. "I Surrender" (B. Simmons, B. Lovelace, D. Bristol) 4:18
3. "Just My Luck" (Kenny Edmonds) 4:30
4. "Sexy Love" (K. Edmonds, A. Reid, S. Burke) 5:00
5. "Street Beat" (Kenneth Gant, Reginald Calloway) 7:55
6. "Video Villain" (Vincent Calloway, Reginald Calloway) 4:54
7. "Crazy 'Bout 'Cha" (Watson, Greene, Cooper, K. Edmonds, A. Reid) 4:34
8. "Working (9 To 5)" (Watson, Greene, Bristol, Roberson, Burke) 4:25

== Personnel ==
- "Carlos" Carl Greene: Main Vocal, Vocal Backing
- "Dee" Darnell Bristol: Vocals
- Kenny Edmonds: Guitars, Keyboards, Vocals
- "Stick" Stanley Burke: Guitars, Vocals
- Melvin Gentry: Guitars
- Bill Simmons, Bo Watson, Vincent Calloway: Keyboards, Synthesizers
- Kevin "Kayo" Roberson: Bass, Vocal Backing
- "L.A." Reid: Drums, Percussion, Vocal Backing

== Charts ==
Chart (1984)	Peak position
Billboard Pop Albums	78
Billboard Top Soul Albums	9 (1983)

=== Singles ===
Year	Single	Chart positions	
Year	Single	US Pop	US R&B
1984	"Body Talk"	77	3
