= Midas Touch (Midnight Star song) =

1986 single by Midnight Star

- 12-inch vinyl extended mix

Single by Midnight Star

from the album Headlines
- Released: 1986
- Genre: Synth-funk, R&B
- Label: SOLAR
- Songwriters: Bo Watson, June Watson Williams
- Producers: Reggie Calloway, Midnight Star

Music video
- "Midas Touch" on YouTube

"Midas Touch" is a song by the American synth-funk group Midnight Star, from their sixth album Headlines (1986). Released in August 1986 by SOLAR Records and produced by group co-founder Reggie Calloway, the song reached number 8 on the UK singles chart in November 1986, in its fifth week on the chart. At the same time, the song hit number 42 on the Billboard pop chart in the US, also reaching number 7 on the Billboard R&B chart. The song was written by the group's vocalist and keyboard player, Bo Watson, and his sister June Watson Williams.

The song is a synth-funk example of 1980s post-disco R&B. The Glasgow-based music writer Steven Vass described the song as having a "glorious vocal melody" delivered by guitarist/drummer/vocalist Melvin Gentry, "sweeping into a lovely smooth chorus, while [producer Reggie] Calloway adds a little golden ching sound after the title line." Vass opined that the "gated snare is not lovely, but it's sweetened by a great liquid bassline and warm synth upstrokes that bring a touch of reggae." Vass wrote that the song is "maybe a truer representation" of Midnight Star than any other song in their repertoire.

The musical style of the song influenced Babyface in his production of music for the Whispers, beginning with the 1987 single "Rock Steady". Its success also allowed Reggie Calloway to spin off a production company, Calloco Productions, formed with his brother Victor. The late 1980s sound of Natalie Cole, Gladys Knight and Levert, all under Calloco guidance, can be traced to "Midas Touch".
