= Meeting in the Ladies Room (song) =

- US picture sleeve

Single by Klymaxx

from the album Meeting in the Ladies Room
- Released: March 7, 1985
- Recorded: 1984
- Genre: Electropop
- Length: 4:33
- Label: Constellation, MCA
- Songwriter(s): Reggie Calloway, Vincent Calloway, Boaz Watson

Klymaxx singles chronology
"The Men All Pause" (1984)	"Meeting in the Ladies Room" (1985)	"I Miss You" (1985)

"Meeting in the Ladies Room" is a song recorded by Klymaxx for the MCA Records label, and the title track from their fourth album. It was written by Reggie Calloway, Vincent Calloway, and Boaz Watson. It was released as a single, reaching number 4 on the Billboard R&B chart, number 59 on the Billboard Hot 100 chart and peaked at number 22 on the Billboard Hot Dance Club Play chart.

== History ==
The success of this song helped their Meeting in the Ladies Room album reach Platinum status. The song's music video was directed by Gerald Casale of Devo and featured an appearance from a then-unknown Vivica A. Fox. The song was also included on the MCA Records motion picture soundtrack for 1985's Secret Admirer. Billboard named the song #85 on their list of 100 Greatest Girl Group Songs of All Time. The song was also featured in an episode of the FX series Pose and in the third season of Logo TV's RuPaul's Drag Race. In addition, a comedy sketch parodying the song was featured in an episode of Saturday Night Live as part of their forty-fourth season, granting both the group and the song with newfound popularity.

== Personnel ==
- Lead vocals Bernadette Cooper, Lorena Porter and Joyce Irby
- Background vocals by Klymaxx

== Usage in media ==
The song was featured in the third season of RuPaul's Drag Race, being performed by contestants India Ferrah and Stacy Layne Matthews in a "lipsync for your life".

== Charts ==
Chart (1985)	Peak position
U.S. Billboard Hot 100	59
U.S. Billboard Dance Music/Club Play Singles	22
U.S. Billboard Hot R&B Singles	4
