= Kahit Sandali (The Best of Jennylyn Mercado) =

Studio album by Jennylyn Mercado
- Released: May 2008
- Recorded: 2008
- Genre: Pop
- Language: English, Tagalog
- Label: GMA Records
- Producer: Felipe S. Yalung (EVP and COO); Buddy Medina (Executive Producer); Kedy Sanchez (Producer); Rene A. Salta (Managing Director)

Jennylyn Mercado chronology
Letting Go (2006)	Kahit Sandali (The Best of Jennylyn Mercado) (2008)	Love Is... (2010)

Singles from Kahit Sandali (The Best of Jennylyn Mercado)
- 1. "How Do I Live (Without You)" Released: 2008; 2. "Nothing's Gonna Change My Love for You" Released: 2008; 3. "P.S. I Love You" Released: 2009

Kahit Sandali (The Best of Jennylyn Mercado) is the third album of singer/actress/host Jennylyn Mercado. This 14-track album was produced and released by GMA Records in May, 2008.

It is also the last album of Mercado under the said recording company, before she transferred to Viva Records.

== Track listing ==
No.	Title	Writer(s)	Length
1.	"How Do I Live (Without You)"	Diane Warren	4:35
2.	"P.S. I Love You"	George Canseco	4:25
3.	"Kaibigang Tunay"	Cymbee Antiporda, Jimmy Antiporda	4:33
4.	"Pangako Mo"	Jennylyn Mercado	3:16
5.	"I'd Still Say Yes"	Babyface	4:43
6.	"If I'm Not In Love With You (with Janno Gibbs)"	Anne Dawn Thomas	3:44
7.	"Sapat Na Ang Minsan"	Agatha Obar	4:38
8.	"Sa Aking Panaginip"	Vehnee Saturno	4:01
9.	"The Art of Letting Go"	J.D. Martin, Andy Goldmark	3:54
10.	"Kahit Sandali"	Vehnee Saturno	4:54
11.	"Moments of Love (with Janno Gibbs)"	Michael Cruz, Isela Cruz	4:08
12.	"Nalilimutan Mo Na Ba"	Rebel Magdagasang	4:31
13.	"Kaya Mo Bang Ibalik"	Jonathan Ong	3:49
14.	"Nothing's Gonna Change My Love for You"	Gerry Goffin, Michael Masser	4:35
