= Never Underestimate the Power of a Woman =

Studio album by Klymaxx
- Released: 1981
- Recorded: 1981
- Genre: R&B; post-disco; funk
- Label: SOLAR
- Producer: Otis Stokes, Stephen Shockley

Klymaxx chronology
Never Underestimate the Power of a Woman (1981)	Girls Will Be Girls (1982)

Professional ratings
Review scores
Source	Rating
Allmusic	4/5 stars

Never Underestimate the Power of a Woman is the debut album by R&B group Klymaxx. Released in 1981, it was produced by Otis Stokes and Stephen Shockley. The title is taken from the slogan of Ladies' Home Journal.

== Track listing ==
1. "All Fired Up" (Otis Stokes, Stephen Shockley) – 6:19
2. "I Wish You Would (Tell Me Something Good)" (Fred, Shockley, Walton, Walton) – 4:38
3. "I Want to Love You Tonight" (Lynn Malsby) – 5:06
4. "You're the Greatest" (Stokes, Shockley) – 4:02
5. "Never Underestimate the Power of a Woman" (Bernadette Cooper, Cheryl Cooley) – 5:08
6. "The Beat of My Heart (is for You)" (Marchbanks, Stokes, Shockley) – 5:48
7. "No Words" (Stokes, Shockley) – 4:22
8. "Can't Let Love Just Pass Me By" (Stokes, Shockley) – 4:48

== Personnel ==
- Cheryl Cooley – guitar, backing vocals
- Bernadette Cooper – drums, percussion, backing vocals
- Robbin Grider – synthesizers
- Joyce "Fenderella" Irby – bass guitar, backing vocals
- Lynn Malsby – keyboards, backing vocals
- Lorena Porter Shelby – lead vocals
- Patricia Sylvers – backing vocals
- Judy Takeuchi – percussion
- Ann Williams – guitar

=== Production ===
- Otis Stokes – producer
- Stephen Shockley – producer
- Dick Griffey – executive producer
- Steve Hodge – recording engineer, mixing
- Taavi Mote – recording engineer
- Bob Brown – additional engineer
- Sabrina Buchanek – additional engineer
- Wally Traugott – mastering
- Dina Andrews – A&R coordination
- Henry Vizcarra – art direction
- Jan Kovaleski – design
- Jay Pope – back cover photo, dust sleeve photography
- Veronica Sim – photography

Studios

- Recorded at Studio Masters (Los Angeles, California) and Larrabee Sound Studios (Hollywood, California).
- Mixed at Larrabee Sound Studios
- Mastered at Capitol Records (Hollywood, California).
