= It's So Easy =

It's So Easy may refer to:

- "It's So Easy" (Guns N' Roses song), 1987
- "It's So Easy!" (The Crickets song), 1958, with a cover version by Linda Ronstadt in 1977
- "It's So Easy" (Andy Williams song), 1970
- "It's So Easy", a song by Hawkwind from their 1974 album Hall of the Mountain Grill
- "It's So Easy", a song by Olivia Newton-John from Have You Never Been Mellow
- "It's So Easy", a song by Sheryl Crow from her 2002 album C'mon, C'mon
- "Mr. Bartender (It's So Easy)", a song by Sugar Ray from their 2003 album In the Pursuit of Leisure
