= I Miss You (Klymaxx song) =

1985 single by Klymaxx

Single by Klymaxx

from the album Meeting in the Ladies Room
- B-side: "Video Kid"
- Released: 1985
- Length: 5:32 (album version); 4:08 (single version)
- Label: Constellation; MCA
- Songwriter: Lynn Malsby
- Producer: Klymaxx

Klymaxx singles chronology
"Meeting in the Ladies Room" (1985)	"I Miss You" (1985)	"Lock and Key" (1985)

Music video
- "I Miss You" on YouTube

"I Miss You" is a song by American R&B and pop group Klymaxx from their fourth album, Meeting in the Ladies Room (1984). Written and co-produced by Klymaxx keyboardist Lynn Malsby, the song was released as the album's third single. "I Miss You" reached number five on the US Billboard Hot 100 chart, number two on the New Zealand Singles Chart, and number one on the Canadian RPM 100 Singles chart. In the US, it remained on the Hot 100 for 29 weeks and ranked in at number three on the year-end Billboard chart for 1986.

== Reception ==
In Smash Hits, Janice Long wrote, "I'd miss this like a hole in the head. One of those lush songs with a vocalist trying desperately to sound like a 10-year-old Michael Jackson."

== Credits ==
- Joyce "Fenderella" Irby: Lead vocals, bass guitar
- Lorena Porter Shelby: Additional vocals
- Lynn Malsby: Keyboards
- Robin Grider: Keyboards
- Cheryl Cooley: Guitar
- Bernadette Cooper: Drums, percussion
- Background vocals by Julia Tillman Waters, Maxine Willard Waters, and Oren Waters

== Charts ==
=== Weekly charts ===
Chart (1985–1987)	Peak position
Belgium (Ultratop 50 Flanders)	31
Canada Top Singles (RPM)	1
Canada Adult Contemporary (RPM)	3
Netherlands (Dutch Top 40)	28
Netherlands (Single Top 100)	32
New Zealand (Recorded Music NZ)	2
UK Singles (Official Charts)	89
US Billboard Hot 100	5
US Adult Contemporary (Billboard)	3
US Hot Black Singles (Billboard)	11
US Cash Box Top 100	13

=== Year-end charts ===
Chart (1986)	Rank
Canada Top Singles (RPM)	34
New Zealand (RIANZ)	7
US Billboard Hot 100	3
US Adult Contemporary (Billboard)	27

== Certifications ==
Region	Certification	Certified units/sales
Canada (Music Canada)	Gold	50,000^{^}
^{^} Shipments figures based on certification alone.
