= The Men All Pause =

Single by Klymaxx

from the album Meeting in the Ladies Room
- Released: October 16, 1984
- Recorded: 1984
- Genre: Soul
- Label: Constellation, MCA
- Songwriter(s): Bernadette Cooper, Joyce Irby

Klymaxx singles chronology
"The Men All Pause" (1984)	"Meeting in the Ladies Room" (1985)

"The Men All Pause" is a hit single recorded by Klymaxx for the MCA label. Written by Bernadette Cooper and Joyce Irby, this song was recorded and released as the first single off their fourth album, Meeting in the Ladies Room. This song reached number 5 on the Billboard R&B chart, number 80 on the Billboard Hot 100, and number 9 on the Billboard Hot Dance Club Play chart. The success of this song helped the group's Meeting in the Ladies Room album reach Platinum status.

== Credits ==
- Lead vocals: Bernadette Cooper and Joyce Irby
- Background vocals: Klymaxx

=== Peak positions ===
Chart (1984)	Peak position
U.S. Billboard Hot 100	80
U.S. Billboard Dance Music/Club Play Singles	9
U.S. Billboard Hot R&B Singles	5
