= Headlines (disambiguation) =

The headline is the text at the top of a newspaper article, indicating the nature of the article below it.

Headline or Headlines may also refer to:

== Music ==
- Headlines (Flash and the Pan album), 1982
- Headlines (Midnight Star album), 1986
- "Headlines", a 1986 song by John Fogerty from Eye of the Zombie
- Headlines, 2005 album by Neon Blonde
- Headlines!, a 2010 EP by The Saturdays
- "Headlines" (Alcazar song), a 2010 song by Alcazar
- "Headlines" (Drake song), a 2011 song by Drake
- "Headlines (Friendship Never Ends)", a 2007 song by the Spice Girls
- Headlines (BGYO EP), a 2025 EP by BGYO

== Films ==
- Headline (film), a 1944 British thriller film
- Headlines (1925 film), a 1925 silent film
- Headlines (2001 film), a 2001 Hong Kong comedy-drama film

== News and publishing ==
- Headline Daily, a free Chinese newspaper
- Headline News, a cable television network
- Headline Publishing Group, a British publishing company
- Headlines Today, an Indian news and information television channel

== Other ==
- Headline (company), a venture capital company
- "Headlines" (Jay Leno), a weekly comedy segment performed on The Jay Leno Show
