= Girls Will Be Girls (Klymaxx album) =

Studio album by Klymaxx
- Released: September 14, 1982
- Recorded: 1982
- Studio: Studio Masters, Los Angeles, CA
- Genre: R&B
- Label: SOLAR
- Producer: Jimmy Jam and Terry Lewis, Otis Stokes, Stephen Shockley

Klymaxx chronology
Never Underestimate the Power of a Woman (1981)	Girls Will Be Girls (1982)	Meeting in the Ladies Room (1984)

Professional ratings
Review scores
Source	Rating
Allmusic	3/5 stars

Girls Will Be Girls is the second album by R&B group Klymaxx. Released in 1982, Produced by Jimmy Jam and Terry Lewis and Lakeside members Otis Stokes and Stephen Shockley with Dynasty member William Shelby. This would be one of the first acts Jimmy Jam and Terry Lewis would begin their writing and production career outside of The Time.

== Track listing ==
1. "Girls Will Be Girls" (Otis Stokes) - 6:09
2. "Wild Girls" (Terry Lewis, James Harris) - 6:01
3. "Convince Me" (Lynn Malsby, Stephen Shockley, Lorena Stewart) - 5:15
4. "The Man in My Life" (Dana Meyers, Dwight T. Smith, Joyce Irby) - 5:27
5. "Heartbreaker (I'm Such a Mess)" (Bernadette Cooper, Cheryl Cooley) - 4:27
6. "All Turned Out" (Bernadette Cooper, Ernest "Pepper" Reed, Joyce Irby, Judy Takeuchi, Lynn Malsby) - 4:54
7. "Offer I Can't Refuse" (Stephen Shockley) - 4:51
8. "If You Love Me" (Otis Stokes) - 5:11
9. "Don't Hide Your Love" (William Shelby, Lorena Stewart) - 4:11

== Personnel ==
- Lorena Porter Hardimon – lead and backing vocals
- Lynn Malsby – keyboards, backing vocals
- Robbin Grider – keyboards, guitar, backing vocals
- Cheryl Cooley – guitar, backing vocals
- M. Ann Williams – guitar
- Joyce "Fenderella" Irby – bass, backing vocals
- Bernadette Cooper – drums, percussion, backing vocals
- Judy Takeuchi – percussion, backing vocals

Arrangement Credits

- Klymaxx – rhythm and vocal arrangements
- Jimmy Jam – rhythm and vocal arrangements
- Terry Lewis – rhythm and vocal arrangements
- Dana Meyers – vocal arrangements
- Earnest Reed – rhythm arrangements
- William Shelby – rhythm and vocal arrangements
- Stephen Shockley – rhythm and vocal arrangements
- Otis Stokes – rhythm and vocal arrangements
- Benjamin Wright – string arrangements
- Janice Gower – string contractor

Production

- Otis Stokes – producer (1, 8)
- Jimmy Jam – producer (2, 4, 5, 6)
- Terry Lewis – producer (2, 4, 5, 6)
- Stephen Shockley – producer (3, 7)
- Joyce "Fenderella" Irby – co-producer (4)
- Bernadette Cooper – co-producer (5)
- William Shelby – producer (10)
- Dick Gafferty – executive producer
- Robert Brown – engineer
- Steve Hodge – engineer, mixing
- Taavi Mote – engineer, mixing
- Jim Shifflett – engineer
- Steve Williams – engineer
- Judy Clapp – assistant engineer
- David Egerton – assistant engineer
- Mishel Persley – assistant engineer
- Wally Traugott – mastering
- Dina Andrews – production direction
- Ron Coro – art direction
- Kristen Kassell Nikosey – art direction, design
- Randee St. Nicholas – photography

Studios

- Recorded at Studio Masters (Los Angeles, California).
- Mixed at Larrabee Sound Studios (Hollywood, California).
- Mastered at Capitol Studios (Hollywood, California).
