= Klymaxx (album) =

Studio album by Klymaxx
- Released: November 10, 1986
- Recorded: 1985–1986
- Genre: Pop; R&B; soul
- Label: Constellation/MCA
- Producer: Joyce "Fenderella" Irby, Bernadette Cooper, Rick Timas, Vincent Brantley, Lynn Malsby, Stephen Shockley, Bruce Swedien, Dick Rudolph, Rod Temperton

Klymaxx chronology
| Meeting in the Ladies Room (1984) | Klymaxx (1986) | The Maxx Is Back (1990) |

Singles from Klymaxx
- 1. "Man Size Love" Released: June 23, 1986; 2. "Sexy" Released: October 20, 1986; 3. "I'd Still Say Yes" Released: February 16, 1987; 4. "Divas Need Love Too" Released: June 22, 1987

Professional ratings
Review scores
| Source | Rating |
|---|---|
| AllMusic | 1.5/5 stars |

Klymaxx is the fourth studio album by Klymaxx, released in 1986. The album peaked at No. 98 on the Billboard 200 and No. 25 on the R&B Albums chart. The album was certified Gold by the RIAA.

Klymaxx gained airplay on MTV, VH1 and BET with the release of their single "Man Size Love". The song reached No. 43 on the R&B chart, No. 15 on the Billboard Hot 100, and No. 18 on the Billboard Dance Chart. The second single "Sexy" reached No. 18 on the R&B chart. The third single "I'd Still Say Yes" reached No. 18 on the Billboard Hot 100, No. 7 on the R&B chart, and No. 8 on the Adult Contemporary chart. It was also certified gold. The fourth and final single was "Divas Need Love Too", which reached #14 on the R&B chart.

== Track listing ==
1. "Sexy" (B. Cooper) - 7:34
2. "Fab Attack" (B. Cooper, C. Cooley, J. Irby, Marquis Dair, Sami McKinney) - 5:33
3. "Divas Need Love Too" (B. Cooper, Vincent Brantley, Rick Timas) - 5:16
4. "I'd Still Say Yes" (Babyface, J. Irby, Greg Scelsa) - 4:40
5. "Fashion" (B. Cooper, Mike Hightower) - 6:36
6. "Danger Zone" (J. Irby, Chuck Gentry) - 4:32
7. "Long Distance Love Affair" (Scott Durbin) - 3:22
8. "Come Back" (L. Malsby) - 6:28
9. "Man Size Love" (Rod Temperton) - 5:40

== Singles released ==
1. "Man Size Love"
2. "Sexy"
3. "I'd Still Say Yes"
4. "Divas Need Love Too"

== Personnel ==
- Lorena Porter Shelby – lead vocals (1, 3, 5, 6, 8, 9), backing vocals (1–9), rap (2)
- Cheryl Cooley – guitars, backing vocals (1–9), guitar solo (2, 6), rap (2)
- Robbin Grider – guitars, keyboards, backing vocals (1–9), synthesizer programming (2), rap (2), acoustic guitar (4)
- Lynn Malsby – keyboards, backing vocals (1–9), rap (2), synthesizer programming (6, 7)
- Joyce "Fenderella" Irby – bass, backing vocals (1–9), lead vocals (2, 4, 6, 7, 8)
- Bernadette Cooper – drums, percussion, lead rap (1, 2, 5), backing vocals (1–9)

Additional personnel

- Marquis Dair – backing vocals (2)
- Siedah Garrett – backing vocals (3)
- Vincent Bradley – arrangements (3)
- Rick Timas – arrangements (3)
- Howard Hewett – additional lead vocals (4)
- The Waters – backing vocals (4, 7, 9)
- Craig Cooper – rhythm and string arrangements (4, 7), synthesizer programming (5)
- Norman Beavers – synthesizer programming (6, 7)
- Rod Temperton – arrangements (9)

=== Production ===
- Bernadette Cooper – producer (1, 3, 5)
- Joyce "Fenderella" Irby – producer (1, 2, 4–7)
- George Clinton – co-producer (1)
- Vincent Bradley – producer (3)
- Rick Timas – producer (3)
- Lynn Malsby – producer (8)
- Stephen Shockley – producer (8)
- Dick Rudolph – producer (9)
- Bruce Sweedin – producer (9), engineer
- Rod Temperton – producer (9)
- Ron Sweeney – executive producer, management
- Regina Griffey – A&R coordinator
- Brenda Patrick – A&R direction
- Glenn Feit – engineer
- Michael Frenke – engineer
- Jon Gass – engineer, mixing
- Steve Hodge – engineer
- Leanard Jackson – engineer, mixing
- Kathy Botich – assistant engineer
- Janine Cirills – assistant engineer
- Ron DaSilva – assistant engineer
- Steve Krause – assistant engineer
- John Payne – assistant engineer
- Alan Skidmore – assistant engineer
- Taavi Mote – remix (1, 2), mixing
- Louis Silas Jr. – remix (1, 2)
- Hill Swimmer – mixing
- Laura Livingston – mix assistant
- Adrian Trujillo – mix assistant
- Jeff Adamoff – art direction
- September – design
- Steve Hall – mastering
- Bobby Holland – photography

Studios

- Recorded at Galaxy Sound Studios, Wide Tracks and Hollywood Central Recorders (Hollywood, California); Image Recording Studios and Studio Masters (Los Angeles, California); O'Henry Sound Studios (Burbank, California); Sound Solution (Santa Monica, California); 54 East Sound Recorders (Pasadena, California).
- Mixed at Encore Studios (Burbank, California); Galaxy Sound Studios and Larrabee Sound Studios (Hollywood, California); Lion Share Recording Studio (Los Angeles, California).
- Mastered at Future Disc (North Hollywood, California).

== Charts ==
=== Weekly charts ===
| Chart (1986–1987) | Peak position |
|---|---|
| US Billboard 200 | 98 |
| US Top R&B/Hip-Hop Albums (Billboard) | 25 |

=== Year-end charts ===
| Chart (1987) | Position |
|---|---|
| US Top R&B Albums (Billboard) | 32 |
