= Mr. Bartender (It's So Easy) =

Single by Sugar Ray

from the album In the Pursuit of Leisure
- Released: April 28, 2003
- Genre: Pop metal
- Length: 3:31
- Label: Atlantic
- Songwriter: Sugar Ray
- Producer: David Kahne

Sugar Ray singles chronology
"Ours" (2002)	"Mr. Bartender (It's So Easy)" (2003)	"Is She Really Going Out with Him?" (2003)

"Mr. Bartender (It's So Easy)" is a song by American rock band Sugar Ray. It was released in April 2003 as the lead single from their album, In the Pursuit of Leisure. The song reached number 20 on the Billboard Adult Top 40 Tracks and contained a short verse by hip-hop artist ProHoeZak.

It heavily samples the R&B group Midnight Star's 1983 single "No Parking (On the Dance Floor)," in addition to incorporating the main guitar riff from Sweet's 1978 hit, "Love is Like Oxygen".

== Music video ==
The music video premiered in May 2003 and features the band working at a car wash. It also features actor John Witherspoon as a car wash owner.

== Charts ==
Chart performance for "Mr. Bartender (It's So Easy)"
Chart (2003)	Peak position
Australia (ARIA)	85
US Adult Pop Airplay (Billboard)	20
US Pop (Radio & Records)	39
