= The Best of Sugar Ray =

Greatest hits album by Sugar Ray
- Released: June 21, 2005; May 16, 2006
- Recorded: 1994–2005
- Genre: Rock; pop; hard rock
- Length: 53:50
- Label: Atlantic; Lava
- Producer: Sugar Ray (compilation); David Kahne; McG; Don Gilmore

Sugar Ray chronology
In the Pursuit of Leisure (2003)	The Best of Sugar Ray (2005)	Music for Cougars (2009)

Professional ratings
Review scores
Source	Rating
AllMusic	4/5 stars

The Best of Sugar Ray is a 2005 Sugar Ray greatest hits album, released by Atlantic Records, consisting of 12 previous hits and 3 new recordings. Tracks 1, 9, and 14 are new tracks. Tracks 7 and 10 are from Lemonade and Brownies, Tracks 3 and 12 are from Floored, Tracks 4, 6 and 8 are from 14:59, Tracks 2, 5, and 11 are from Sugar Ray, and Tracks 13 and 15 are from In the Pursuit of Leisure. The 3 new songs are: "Shot of Laughter", a cover of Cyndi Lauper's "Time After Time", and a song written by a teenage Howard Stern, "Psychedelic Bee". "Mr. Bartender" is the only hit single absent from the album.

== Reception ==
The Philippine Daily Inquirer noted the inclusion of the heavier material from the band's early albums. They wrote in their September 2005 review, "originally a funk metal band [they've] included two tracks from their debut in this 'best-of' — "Mean Machine" and "Rhythm Stealer". Let's just say that their moving away from metal was the best career decision they ever made."

Stephen Thomas Erlewine of AllMusic awarded it four out of five stars, writing that after the commercial underperformance of In the Pursuit of Leisure it "became clear that it wouldn't be long before that hits disc came along", adding "and here it is: Greatest Hits, released in the middle of June 2005, just as the summer was getting under way. That's appropriate, [it] is the perfect soundtrack for lazy days at the beach." He also noted that the mood of the album is "occasionally broken by such remnants of the group's metallic beginnings as 'Rhyme Stealer' and 'RPM,' which stand in uneasy contrast to the sunny, friendly sound."

== Track listing ==
No.	Title	Writer(s)	Original album	Length
1.	"Shot of Laughter"	Stan Frazier; Mark McGrath; Murphy Karges; Rodney Sheppard; David Kahne	previously unissued	3:42
2.	"Answer the Phone"	M. Karges; Frazier; McGrath; Don Gilmore	Sugar Ray (2001)	3:58
3.	"Fly" (featuring Super Cat)	McGrath; Sheppard; M. Karges; Frazier; Craig Bullock; Alan Shacklock; William Maragh	Floored (1997)	4:53
4.	"Someday"	McGrath; Sheppard; M. Karges; Frazier; Bullock; Joe Nichol; Kahne	14:59 (1999)	4:04
5.	"Under the Sun"	Frazier; Karges; McGrath; Gilmore; Terry Karges	Sugar Ray	3:22
6.	"Every Morning"	McGrath; Sheppard; M. Karges; Frazier; Bullock; Nichol; Kahne; Richard Bean; Abel Zarate; Pablo Tellez	14:59	3:41
7.	"Mean Machine"	McGrath; Sheppard; M. Karges; Frazier; Nichol; Charlie Ryan; W.S. Stevenson	Lemonade and Brownies (1995)	2:42
8.	"Falls Apart"	McGrath; Sheppard; M. Karges; Frazier; Bullock; Nichol; Kahne	14:59	4:16
9.	"Time After Time"	Rob Hyman; Cyndi Lauper	previously unissued	3:56
10.	"Rhyme Stealer"	McGrath; Sheppard; M. Karges; Frazier; Nichol	Lemonade and Brownies	2:53
11.	"When It's Over"	Frazier; Sheppard; McGrath; Bullock; Kahne	Sugar Ray	3:39
12.	"RPM"	McGrath; Sheppard; M. Karges; Frazier; Bullock; David Sabo; Kahne	Floored	3:22
13.	"Is She Really Going Out with Him?"	Joe Jackson	In the Pursuit of Leisure (2003)	3:50
14.	"Psychedelic Bee"	Howard Stern	previously unissued	1:54
15.	"Chasin' You Around"	Bullock; Sheppard; McGrath; M. Karges; Kahne	In the Pursuit of Leisure	3:38

== Personnel ==
Sugar Ray

- Mark McGrath – vocals, guitars
- Rodney Sheppard – guitars, backing vocals
- Murphy Karges – bass
- Stan Frazier – drums, guitars, backing vocals
- Craig "DJ Homicide" Bullock – turntables and backing vocals (1–6, 8, 9, 11–15), additional scratches (7, 10), additional programming (13, 15)

Additional personnel

- Mon Agranat – additional engineering (7, 10)
- Michael Brauer – mixing (13, 15)
- Rob Brill – engineer (13, 15)
- John Brower – mixing (1, 9, 14)
- Daniel M. Certa – additional engineering and assistance (2, 5, 11)
- Barry "Lord" Conley – additional engineering (7, 10)
- Steve Duda – additional engineering (13, 15)
- John Ewing – engineer (2, 5, 11), additional engineering (7, 10), assistant engineer (3, 12)
- Eric Fischer – additional engineering (7, 10)
- Steve Gallagher – engineer (2, 4–6, 8, 11), additional engineering (7, 10, 13, 15)
- Don Gilmore – producer (2, 5), engineer (2, 5, 11)
- David Kahne – producer (1, 3, 4, 6, 8, 9, 11–15), programming (3, 4, 6, 8, 11–13, 15), engineer (3, 4, 6, 8, 13, 15), mixing (3, 4, 6, 8, 11–13, 15), keyboards (3, 12)
- Steve Kaplan – assistant mix engineer (2, 5)
- David Leonard – mixing (11)
- DJ Lethal – beats and executive producer (2, 5)
- Chris Lord-Alge – mixing (2, 5)
- McG – producer (7, 10)
- Kevin Mills – assistant engineer (13, 15)
- James Murray – assistant engineer (3, 12)
- Mark Nixdorf – assistant engineer (3, 12)
- Mike Rew – assistant engineer (3, 12)
- Jason Roberts – mixing (7, 10)
- Matt Silva – assistant mix engineer (2, 5)
- Super Cat – additional vocals (3)
- Doug Trantow – assistant engineer (3, 12)
- John Travis – tracking engineer (3, 12), engineer and mixing (4, 6, 8)
- Alex Uychocde – assistant mix engineer (11, 13, 15)
- Ben Wallach – engineer (7, 10)

== Charts ==
Chart (2005)	Peak position
US Billboard 200	136
