= Planetary Invasion =

Studio album by Midnight Star
- Released: November 11, 1984
- Recorded: 1984
- Studio: QCA Recording Studios and Fifth Floor Studio, Cincinnati, Ohio
- Genre: R&B
- Length: 45:12
- Label: SOLAR
- Producer: Reggie Calloway

Midnight Star chronology
No Parking on the Dance Floor (1983)	Planetary Invasion (1984)	Headlines (1986)

Singles from Planetary Invasion
- 1. "Operator" Released: October 13, 1984; 2. "Scientific Love" Released: February 10, 1985; 3. "Body Snatchers/Curious" Released: May 21, 1985

Professional ratings
Review scores
Source	Rating
AllMusic	4/5 stars

Planetary Invasion is the fifth album released by R&B group Midnight Star. Released in 1984 and produced by group member Reggie Calloway, this album peaked at number seven on the R&B albums chart led by the number-one R&B single "Operator." This single also scored the group their first (and to date, only) top-20 single on the pop charts, peaking at No. 18 in early 1985.

== Track listing ==
1. "Body Snatchers" (Reggie Calloway, Vincent Calloway, Melvin Gentry, Bill Simmons, Bo Watson) 6:55
2. "Scientific Love" (Calloway, Gentry, Kenneth Gant, Belinda Lipscomb, Watson) 6:19
3. "Let's Celebrate" (Calloway, Jeff Cooper, Gentry, Lipscomb, Bobby Lovelace, Watson) 4:57
4. "Curious" (Gentry, Lovelace, Watson) 4:19
5. "Planetary Invasion" (Calloway, Calloway, Lovelace, Simmons, Watson) 6:10
6. "Operator" (Calloway, Calloway, Lipscomb, Watson) 7:30
7. "Today My Love" (Calloway, Watson) 4:59
8. "Can You Stay with Me" (Calloway, Cooper, Lipscomb, Lovelace, Simmons, Watson) 4:03

== Personnel ==
- Belinda Lipscomb — lead and backing vocals
- Melvin Gentry — lead and backing vocals, guitar, bass, percussion, drums
- Bo Watson — lead and backing vocals, synthesizers
- Reggie Calloway — trumpet, backing vocals, flute, percussion, keyboards
- Vincent Calloway — trombone, trumpet, flute, percussion, keyboards, vocoder
- Jeffery Cooper — guitar, keyboards
- Bill Simmons — keyboards, backing vocals, saxophone, percussion
- Kenneth Gant — bass, bass vocals, keyboards, trombone
- Bobby Lovelace — drums, backing vocals, percussion

== Charts ==
=== Weekly charts ===
Chart (1984)	Peak position
US Billboard 200	32
US Top R&B/Hip-Hop Albums (Billboard)	7

=== Year-end charts ===
Chart (1985)	Position
US Billboard 200	89
US Top R&B/Hip-Hop Albums (Billboard)	27

=== Singles ===
Year	Single	Chart positions		
Year	Single	US	US R&B	US Dance
1984	"Operator"	18	1	15
1985	"Scientific Love"	80	16	19
1985	"Body Snatchers"	—	31	—
