= One Day (Klymaxx album) =

Studio album by Klymaxx
- Released: 1994
- Genre: Pop/R&B
- Label: Valley Vue/MCA

Klymaxx chronology
The Maxx Is Back (1990)	One Day (1994)	Greatest Hits (1996)

One Day is the sixth studio album by Klymaxx, released in 1994. The album has sold approximately 40,000 copies in the United States.

== Track listing ==
1. "One Day"
2. "Code Blue"
3. "All I Think About Is You"
4. "Every Heart Needs Love"
5. "4 The Ole Dawg N U"
6. "Dear John"
7. "This Doesn't Feel Like Love Anymore"
8. "This Time"
9. "Ain't Nobody"
10. "The Night Moves"
11. "Here It Comes From You"
12. "Not Gonna Stop Lovin' You"
13. "Klymaxx Supper Club (Interlude)"
14. "All I Think (Reprise)"
15. "Once Before You Go"

== Singles released ==
- "All I Think About is You"
- "4 the Ole Dawg N U"
