= Divas Need Love Too =

Single by Klymaxx

from the album Klymaxx
- Released: June 22, 1987
- Recorded: 1986
- Genre: Soul
- Label: Constellation Records, MCA Records
- Songwriters: Vincent Brantley, Bernadette Cooper, Rick Timas

Klymaxx singles chronology
"I'd Still Say Yes" (1987)	"Divas Need Love Too" (1987)	"Good Love" (1990)

"Divas Need Love Too" is a single recorded by Klymaxx for the MCA label. Relying on an outside producer and songwriters, this song was recorded and released as the fourth and final single from their fifth album, Klymaxx. This song reached number 14 on the Billboard R&B Singles chart.

== Credits ==
- Lead vocals Lorena Porter and Bernadette Cooper
- Background vocals by Klymaxx
- Written by Bernadette Cooper, Vincent Brantley and Rick Timas.
