= Operator (Midnight Star song) =

Single by Midnight Star

from the album Planetary Invasion
- B-side: "Playmates"
- Released: October 13, 1984
- Recorded: 1984
- Length: 7:30 (album version); 4:04 (single version)
- Label: SOLAR
- Songwriters: Bo Watson; Belinda Lipscomb; Reggie Calloway
- Producer: Reggie Calloway

Midnight Star singles chronology
"No Parking (On the Dance Floor)" (1984)	"Operator" (1984)	"Scientific Love" (1985)

"Operator" is a 1984 R&B/electronic dance song by Midnight Star, produced by then-current bandmember Reggie Calloway, released as a single from their album, Planetary Invasion.

"Operator" cracked the US pop top 20, peaking at number 18, and remains Midnight Star's only top 40 hit on the Billboard Hot 100. It also hit number one on the US R&B Singles chart for five weeks in late 1984 and early 1985.

A music video was also released. In the video, the band members perform on stage. There are also scenes depicting emergency services telephone operators in a control room singing to the lyrics.

== Chart performance ==
Chart (1984–1985)	Peak position
UK Singles (Official Charts Company)	66
US Billboard Hot 100	18
US Billboard Dance/Disco	15
US Hot Black Singles (Billboard)	1

== See also ==
- List of number-one R&B singles of 1984 (U.S.)
