= The Maxx Is Back =

Studio album by Klymaxx
- Released: 1990
- Recorded: 1990
- Studio: Aire L.A. Studios, M'Bila Studios, Soundcastle, JHL Studios, Eight Mile Road Studios, Stagg Street Studios, A&M Studios
- Genre: Pop/R&B
- Label: MCA
- Producer: Curtis Williams, Vassal Benford, Mark A. Sylvia, Robert Harris, Rex Salas, Alton "Wokie" Stewart, Timmy Gatling, Jimmy Jam and Terry Lewis

Klymaxx chronology
Klymaxx (1986)	The Maxx Is Back (1990)	One Day (1994)

Singles from The Maxx Is Back
- 1. "Good Love" Released: April 17, 1990; 2. "Private Party" Released: August 14, 1990

Professional ratings
Review scores
Source	Rating
Allmusic	2/5 stars
Select	2/5 medals

The Maxx Is Back is the fifth studio album by Klymaxx, released in 1990 (see 1990 in music), by which time the group only consisted of three original members, Lorena Porter Shelby (lead vocals), Cheryl Cooley (guitar) and Robbin Grider (keyboards). Bernadette Cooper (vocals/drums), Lynn Malsby (keyboards) and Joyce "Fenderella" Irby (bass guitar/vocals) were not involved in the project.

The first single, "Good Love", was successful in the United States among R&B fans, reaching number four on the R&B chart. The second and final single, "Private Party", was a moderate hit, peaking at number 62 on the R&B chart.

The album reached number 168 on the Billboard 200 and number 32 on the R&B Albums chart. The album has sold approximately 166,000 copies in the U.S'.

== Track listing ==
1. "The Maxx Is Back" (4:49)
2. "Good Love" (5:46)
3. "Private Party" (4:01)
4. "When You Kiss Me" (6:35)
5. "Finishing Touch" (4:20)
6. "Girls Chasing Boys" (5:09)
7. "Don't Mess With My Man" (5:30)
8. "Shame" (4:52)
9. "Don't Run Away" (5:13)
10. "She's a User" (5:22)
11. "Good Love (Extended Hype Club Vibe)" (6:42)
