= All the Way (Calloway album) =

Studio album by Calloway
- Released: August 13, 1989
- Recorded: 1988–1989
- Studio: QCA Studios, Cincinnati; Aire L.A. Studios, Los Angeles; Larrabee Sound, Los Angeles; JHL Studios Pacific Palisades
- Genre: R&B; soul; funk
- Length: 53:50
- Label: Epic
- Producer: Calloway (also executive producers)

Calloway chronology
All the Way (1989)	Let's Get Smooth (1992)

All the Way is the debut studio album from sibling duo Vincent and Reggie Calloway, better known as Calloway. Released in 1989, the album contained their biggest pop hit in the track "I Wanna Be Rich", which reached number two on the Billboard Hot 100. The song also became their biggest R&B/soul hit, peaking at number 5. The ballad "You Are My Everything", on the other hand, was the most successful song of the duo in Asia, particularly in the Philippines during the early 1990s.

== Track listing ==
- All songs written by Vincent and Reggie Calloway, except where noted.
1. "Sir Lancelot" 5:50
2. "I Wanna Be Rich" (Reggie Calloway, Vincent Calloway, Melvin Gentry, Belinda Lipscomb) 5:08
3. "Love Circles" 6:34
4. "Freaks Compete" 5:16
5. "You Are My Everything" 4:28
6. "All the Way" 6:50
7. "I Want You" 5:06
8. "Sugar Free" 4:44
9. "You Can Count on Me" 4:46
10. "Holiday" 4:50

== Personnel ==
=== Calloway ===
- Reggie Calloway: Vocals, Flute, Flugelhorn, Drum Programming
- Vincent Calloway: Vocals, Trombone, Flugelhorn, Keyboards, Vocoder, Drum Programming

=== Additional personnel ===
- Rasheeda Azar: Vocals
- D'LaVance, Donnell Spencer Jr., Keith John, Kipper Jones, Valerie K. Watson: Vocal Backing
- Charles Fearing, Gene Robinson, Kane Roberts, Paul Jackson Jr.: Guitars
- Derek Nakamoto, Odeen Mays, Randy Kerber: Keyboards
- Chuckii Booker, Jeff Lorber: Keyboards, Drum Programming
- Joel Davis: Keyboards, Vocal Backing
- Todd Herreman: Additional Programming
- Michael Sharfe, Freddie Washington: Bass
- Kenny Bobinger, Carlos Vega: Drums
- Paulinho da Costa, Tim Cornwell: Percussion
- Gerald Albright: Saxophone
- George Bohanon: Trombone

== Production ==
- Arranged and produced by Calloway
- Recording Engineers: Craig Burbidge, David Koenig, Donnie Kraft, Elliot Peters, Jeff Lorber, Jim Krause, Rob Chicarelli, Rob Seifert, Robin Jenney
- Assistant Recording Engineers: Andy Batwinas, Gregg Darrett, Jackie Forsting, Kimm James, Mike Scotella, Neal H. Pogue, Sylvia Massy
- Mixed by Barney Perkins, Craig Burbidge, Keith Cohen and Taavi Mote
