= I Wanna Be Rich =

1989 single by Calloway

Single by Calloway

from the album All the Way
- Released: October 18, 1989
- Length: 5:08 (album version); 4:30 (7-inch version)
- Label: Solar
- Songwriters: Reggie Calloway; Vincent Calloway; Melvin Gentry; Belinda Lipscomb
- Producer: Calloway

Calloway singles chronology
"Sir Lancelot" (1988)	"I Wanna Be Rich" (1989)	"Let's Get Smooth" (1992)

"I Wanna Be Rich" is a song by American R&B duo Calloway. It was released in October 1989 as the third and final single from their debut album, All the Way (1989). It is the band's only top-10 hit on the US Billboard Hot 100, reaching number two in May 1990, and it also peaked at number five on the Billboard Hot Black Singles chart. The UK single includes remixes by DJ Timmy Regisford. In Japan, the song was released as a double A-side with the previous single, "Sir Lancelot".

== Track listing ==
A-side

1. "I Wanna Be Rich" (extended mix) – 7:25
2. "I Wanna Be Rich" (7-inch version) – 4:30
3. "I Wanna Be Rich" (dub version) – 4:30

B-side

1. "I Wanna Be Rich" (12-inch dance mix) – 8:05
2. "I Wanna Be Rich" (12-inch dance dub) – 7:58

== Charts ==
=== Weekly charts ===
Chart (1990)	Peak position
Australia (ARIA)	60
Canada Top Singles (RPM)	10
Canada Adult Contemporary (RPM)	5
New Zealand (Recorded Music NZ)	17
UK Singles (Official Charts)	100
US Billboard Hot 100	2
US Adult Contemporary (Billboard)	20
US Dance Singles Sales (Billboard)	21
US Hot R&B/Hip-Hop Songs (Billboard)	5
US Cash Box Top 100	2

=== Year-end charts ===
Chart (1990)	Position
Canada Adult Contemporary (RPM)	56
US Billboard Hot 100	22
US Hot R&B Singles (Billboard)	66
US Cash Box Top 100	23

== Certifications ==
Region	Certification	Certified units/sales
United States (RIAA)	Gold	500,000^{^}
^{^} Shipments figures based on certification alone.

== Release history ==
Region	Version	Date	Format(s)	Label(s)	Ref.
United States	"I Wanna Be Rich"	October 18, 1989	7-inch vinyl; 12-inch vinyl; cassette	Solar	
Australia	"I Wanna Be Rich"	May 14, 1990	7-inch vinyl; 12-inch vinyl; cassette	Epic	
United Kingdom	"I Wanna Be Rich"	June 4, 1990	7-inch vinyl	Epic	
United Kingdom	"I Wanna Be Rich"	June 11, 1990	12-inch vinyl; CD; cassette	Epic	
Japan	"Sir Lancelot" / "I Wanna Be Rich"	July 21, 1990	Mini-CD	CBS/Sony	
