= I'd Still Say Yes =

Single by Klymaxx

from the album Klymaxx
- B-side: "Ask Me No Questions"
- Released: February 16, 1987
- Recorded: 1986
- Genre: R&B
- Length: 4:28
- Label: MCA
- Songwriters: Babyface; Greg Scelsa; Joyce "Fenderella" Irby
- Producer: Fenderella

Klymaxx singles chronology
| "Sexy" (1986) | "I'd Still Say Yes" (1987) | "Divas Need Love Too" (1987) |

"I'd Still Say Yes" is a song recorded by Klymaxx for the Constellation/MCA label. Written by Kenneth "Babyface" Edmonds, Greg Scelsa, and Joyce "Fenderella" Irby, and produced by Fenderella, it was released as the third single from their fifth album, Klymaxx, helping it reach gold status. The song featured backing vocals by R&B singer Howard Hewett. Reaching its peak at number 7 on Billboard's Black Singles chart, and number 18 on the Billboard Hot 100, it was the group's last Hot 100 entry. "I'd Still Say Yes" also went to number eight on the Billboard Adult Contemporary chart. In Canada, it reached No. 50.

== Vocal credits ==
- Lead vocal: Joyce Irby
- Additional vocals: Howard Hewett
- Background vocals: Klymaxx

== Cover versions ==
- The Braxtons covered the song on their album So Many Ways in 1996 and Demail Burks of A Few Good Men also provided backing vocals.
- In 2002, Native Blend released their cover version on Flyin Hawaiian Records.
- In 2006, Jennylyn Mercado covered it on her album Letting Go.
