= Man Size Love =

Single by Klymaxx

from the album Klymaxx and Running Scared soundtrack
- Released: 23 June 1986
- Recorded: 1986
- Genre: Soul · R&B · synth-pop
- Length: 3:58
- Label: MCA
- Songwriter: Rod Temperton
- Producers: Dick Rudolph, Bruce Swedien, and Rod Temperton

Klymaxx singles chronology
"Lock and Key" (1985)	"Man Size Love" (1986)	"Sexy" (1986)

"Man Size Love" is a song written by Rod Temperton. The song was recorded by Klymaxx, and produced by Temperton, along with Dick Rudolph and Bruce Swedien. It reached No. 15 on the Billboard Hot 100. In Canada it reached No. 55

== Background ==
This synth-heavy song lyrics tell how a woman wants a real man to satisfy her. "Man Size Love" was recorded for the MCA label and was released as the first single from Klymaxx's self-titled fifth album. The song also appears in the 1986 film Running Scared as well as being included on the Running Scared soundtrack album.

== Cover versions ==
"Man Size Love" reached No. 15 on the Billboard Hot 100, No. 43 on the publication's R&B chart. On the dance chart it peaked at No. 18, helping the Klymaxx LP reach gold status.

== Credits ==
- Lead vocals: Lorena Porter
- Background vocals: Klymaxx
