= Sexy (Klymaxx song) =

Single by Klymaxx

from the album Klymaxx
- Released: October 20, 1986
- Recorded: 1986
- Genre: Soul · R&B
- Label: MCA
- Songwriter: Bernadette Cooper

Klymaxx singles chronology
| "Man Size Love" (1986) | "Sexy" (1986) | "I'd Still Say Yes" (1987) |

"Sexy" is a song recorded by Klymaxx for the MCA label. Produced and written by Bernadette Cooper with George Clinton, the song was recorded and released as the second single from their fifth album, Klymaxx. The song reached number 18 on the Billboard Black Singles Chart.

== Credits ==
- Lead vocals Lorena Porter, Bernadette Cooper and Lynn Malsby
- Background vocals by KlymaxxĹy
