= Standing Together (Midnight Star album) =

Studio album by Midnight Star
- Released: 1981
- Recorded: 1981
- Genre: Soul
- Label: SOLAR Records
- Producer: Leon Sylvers III

Midnight Star chronology
The Beginning (1980)	Standing Together (1981)	Victory (1982)

Professional ratings
Review scores
Source	Rating
AllMusic	2/5 stars
The Rolling Stone Album Guide	2.5/5 stars

Standing Together is an album by Midnight Star. It was released in 1981 on SOLAR Records.

== Track listing ==
1. "Standing Together" 5:00
2. "Tuff " 5:05
3. "Can't Give You Up" 4:13
4. "Hold Out" 4:58
5. "I've Been Watching You" 6:00
6. "I Won't Let You Be Lonely" 4:05
7. "I Got What You Need" 4:38
8. "Open Up To Love" 4:38

== Chart positions ==
=== Album ===
Chart (1981)	Peak position
Billboard Top R&B Albums	54

=== Singles ===
Year	Single	Chart position
Year	Single	US R&B
1981	"I've Been Watching You"	36
1981	"Tuff "	60
