= Body Talk (The Deele song) =

Single by the Deele

from the album Street Beat
- B-side: "Body Talk" (instrumental)
- Released: January 1984
- Recorded: 1983
- Genre: R&B
- Label: Solar
- Songwriters: Stanley Burke, Melvin Gentry, Carl Greene, Antonio Reid, Bo Watson

The Deele singles chronology
"Just My Luck" (1983)	"Body Talk" (1984)	"Sweet Nothingz" (1985)

"Body Talk" is a song by American band the Deele. It was released as a single in January 1984 and peaked at number 77 on the Billboard Hot 100. It also reached the top ten on the R&B chart. The song also featured in the Miami Vice pilot episode "Brother's Keeper."

== Chart positions ==
Chart (1984)	Peak position
U.S. Billboard Hot 100	77
U.S. Billboard Hot Black Singles	3
