= No Parking (On the Dance Floor) =

Single by Midnight Star

from the album No Parking on the Dance Floor
- Released: January 28, 1984
- Recorded: November 1982 at QCA Recording Studios and Fifth Floor Studio, (Cincinnati, Ohio)
- Genre: Soul; R&B; electro; pop
- Length: 5:52
- Label: Solar
- Songwriters: Calloway, Lovelace, Simmons
- Producer: Reggie Calloway

Midnight Star singles chronology
"Wet My Whistle" (1983)	"No Parking (On the Dance Floor)" (1984)	"Operator" (1984)

"No Parking (On the Dance Floor)" is the title track from Midnight Star's fourth and most successful album, No Parking on the Dance Floor. In the US, the song reached number 43 on the R&B chart, number 44 on the dance chart, and number 81 on the Billboard Hot 100.

The song has been sampled by several artists since its 1983 release, including Sugar Ray's song from 2003, "Mr. Bartender (It's So Easy)". The basic melody was sampled by the Bar-Kays in their 1984 hit "Freakshow on the Dance Floor" and in Popula Demand's 1988 song "Don't Clock Me". It was lyrically referenced in They Might Be Giants' 2018 song "Let's Get This Over With" from their album I Like Fun.
