= No Parking on the Dance Floor =

Studio album by Midnight Star
- Released: June 6, 1983
- Recorded: 1982–1983
- Studio: QCA Recording Studios; Fifth Floor Studio (Cincinnati, Ohio)
- Genre: R&B; funk; electro; soul; pop
- Length: 42:07
- Label: SOLAR
- Producer: Reggie Calloway

Midnight Star chronology
Victory (1982)	No Parking on the Dance Floor (1983)	Planetary Invasion (1984)

Singles from No Parking on the Dance Floor
- 1. "Freak-A-Zoid" Released: May 15, 1983; 2. "Wet My Whistle" Released: August 3, 1983; 3. "No Parking (On the Dance Floor)" Released: January 28, 1984

Professional ratings
Review scores
Source	Rating
AllMusic	4.5/5 stars

No Parking on the Dance Floor is an album by American vocal band Midnight Star, released on June 6, 1983. The album contains the singles "Freak-A-Zoid", "Wet My Whistle", "Electricity" and "No Parking (On the Dance Floor)", as well as the seminal quiet storm anthem, "Slow Jam". Of all of the group's albums, it is their most successful, in that it achieved the highest chart placings on the U.S. Billboard 200 and R&B albums charts, as well as in New Zealand, where it peaked at No. 30.

== Track listing ==
1. "Electricity" - (Reggie Calloway, Bill Simmons) 6:58
2. "Night Rider" - (Jeff Cooper, Melvin Gentry, Belinda Lipscomb, B. Simmons, Bo Watson) 4:40
3. "Feels So Good" - (Kenneth Gant, B. Lipscomb) 4:23
4. "Wet My Whistle" - (Reggie Calloway) 5:06
5. "No Parking (On the Dance Floor)" - (Vincent Calloway, Bobby Lovelace, Simmons) 4:27
6. "Freak-A-Zoid" - (Reggie Calloway, V. Calloway, B. Simmons) 8:06
7. "Slow Jam" - (Kenneth Edmonds, Lipscomb, B. Watson) 4:17
8. "Playmates" - (B. Lipscomb, B. Simmons, B. Watson) 4:10

== Charts ==
Chart (1983)	Peak position
Billboard Pop Albums	27
Billboard Top Soul Albums	2

=== Singles ===
Year	Single	Chart positions		
Year	Single	US	US R&B	US Dance
1983	"Freak-A-Zoid"	66	2	44
1983	"Wet My Whistle"	61	8	15
1984	"No Parking (On the Dance Floor)"	81	43	44
