= Good Love (Klymaxx song) =

Single by Klymaxx

from the album The Maxx Is Back
- Released: April 17, 1990
- Recorded: 1990
- Genre: soul
- Label: MCA
- Songwriter(s): Vassal Benford, Ronald Spearman

Klymaxx singles chronology
"Divas Need Love Too" (1987)	"Good Love" (1990)	"Private Party" (1990)

"Good Love" is a single recorded by Klymaxx for the MCA label. Relying on an outside producer and songwriters, this song was recorded and released as the first single from their sixth album, The Maxx Is Back. This song reached number four on the Billboard Hot R&B Singles chart. At this time, the group only consisted of 3 members.

== Credits ==
- Lead vocals Lorena Porter
- Background vocals by Klymaxx
