= Lock and Key (Klymaxx song) =

Single by Klymaxx

from the album Meeting in the Ladies Room
- Released: June 18, 1985
- Recorded: 1984
- Genre: Funk
- Label: MCA
- Songwriter(s): Cooper, V. Spino

Klymaxx singles chronology
"I Miss You" (1985)	"Lock and Key" (1985)	"Man Size Love" (1986)

"Lock and Key" is a moderate hit single recorded by Klymaxx for the MCA label. Relying on an outside producer and songwriters, this song was recorded and released as the fourth single from their fourth album, Meeting in the Ladies Room. This song reached number 47 on the Billboard R&B chart.

== Credits ==
- Lead vocals Lorena Porter
- Background vocals by Klymaxx
