= Headlines (Midnight Star album) =

Studio album by Midnight Star
- Released: May 5, 1986
- Recorded: 1985–1986
- Studios: QCA Recording Studios and Fifth Floor Studio (Cincinnati, Ohio); Quadrasonic (New York City)
- Genres: R&B; post-disco; dance-pop
- Length: 45:12
- Labels: SOLAR; Elektra
- Producers: Reggie Calloway; Midnight Star

Midnight Star chronology
Planetary Invasion (1984)	Headlines (1986)	Midnight Star (1988)

Singles from Headlines
- 1. "Headlines" Released: 1986; 2. "Midas Touch" Released: 1986; 3. "Engine No. 9" Released: 1986

Headlines is an album by the R&B group Midnight Star, released in 1986. It was the last album to include the Calloway brothers, who left to form Calloway.

The album peaked at No. 42 on the UK Albums Chart.

== Critical reception ==
Professional ratings
Review scores
Source	Rating
AllMusic	3.5/5 stars

The Los Angeles Times wrote that "there isn't enough heavyweight material here ... These kind of 'Headlines' only rate a cursory scan." The Ottawa Citizen thought that "the sultry voice of Belinda Lipscomb on two slow dancers, 'Searching for Love' and 'Stay Here by My Side', make Headlines a complete and solid effort from Midnight Star."

== Commercial performance ==
The album was certified gold on August 25, 1986.

== Track listing ==
1. "Headlines" – 7:49 (Belinda Lipscomb, Bill Simmons, Bobby Lovelace, Melvin Gentry, Reggie Calloway, Vincent Calloway)
2. "Midas Touch" – 5:00 (Bo Watson, June Watson-Williams)
3. "Stay Here by My Side" – 4:40 (Simmons)
4. "Close to Midnight" – 4:33 (Watson, M. Gentry, Karen Gentry)
5. "Get Dressed" – 4:58 (Lipscomb, Watson, Watson-Williams, M. Gentry)
6. "Engine No. 9" – 5:23 (Lovelace, K. Gentry, M. Gentry)
7. "Close Encounter" – 4:20 (Lipscomb, Simmons, R. Calloway, V. Calloway)
8. "Dead End" – 4:24 (Lipscomb, Watson, R. Calloway, V. Calloway)
9. "Searching for Love" – 5:01 (Lipscomb, Watson)

== Personnel ==
=== Midnight Star ===
- Belinda Lipscomb: Vocals
- Bo Watson: Vocals, keyboards, synth programming
- Melvin Gentry: Lead guitar, percussion, backing vocals
- Jeff Cooper: Rhythm guitar, synth programming
- Kenneth Gant: Bass guitar, vocals
- Bill Simmons: Saxophone, keyboards, synth programming
- Reggie Calloway: Keyboards, trumpet, flute, vocals
- Vincent Calloway: Keyboards, trumpet, trombone, vocoder
- Bobby Lovelace: Drums, drum programming, percussion

=== Additional personnel ===
- Marcus Miller: Bass on track 6

== Charts ==
=== Weekly charts ===
Chart (1986)	Peak position
US Billboard 200	56
US Top R&B/Hip-Hop Albums (Billboard)	7

=== Year-end charts ===
Chart (1986)	Position
US Top R&B/Hip-Hop Albums (Billboard)	34

=== Singles ===
Title	Year	Chart positions		
Title	Year	US	US R&B	US Dance
"Headlines"	1986	69	3	34
"Midas Touch"	1986	42	7	—
"Engine No. 9"	1986	—	11	—

== Certifications ==
Region	Certification	Certified units/sales
United States (RIAA)	Gold	500,000^{^}
^{^} Shipments figures based on certification alone.
