= Constellation Records (Solar) =

American sub-label of SOLAR Records

- Parent company: Unidisc Music
- Founded: 1981
- Founder: Dick Griffey
- Defunct: 1987
- Status: Defunct
- Distributor(s): Elektra Records (1981 - 1984); MCA Records (1984 - 1987)
- Genre: Soul; Post-disco; R&B
- Country of origin: United States
- Location: Los Angeles, California

Constellation Records was an American label of SOLAR Records, and then MCA Records.

== History ==
In 1981, Constellation was founded by Dick Griffey, as an attempt to introduce more contemporary acts to Griffey's more traditionally "urban" establishment which was already being distributed through Elektra/Asylum Records.

In 1984, Dick Griffey moved the Constellation label over to MCA Records for distribution, deciding to abandon contemporary music and continue the SOLAR tradition. It was a move that finally brought recognition to the label. Among the acts who shifted to the label were veteran Soul Train/SOLAR first lady Carrie Lucas (who eventually married Griffey) and Klymaxx.

In 1987, Constellation was folded into MCA, when the artists (including Klymaxx) were transferred to MCA. Universal Music Group owned all of its post-1984 back catalog. On the other hand, EMI (which acquired SOLAR's back catalog after its closure in 1995) owned all of its pre-1984 back catalog. Unidisc Music currently owns most of SOLAR's (including Constellation) back catalog.

== Notable artists ==
- Jon Gibson
- Klymaxx
- Carrie Lucas
- Bill Wolfer
- Collage
