= Klymaxx =

American pop/R&B band

- Origin: Los Angeles, California, United States
- Genres: Pop, R&B, dance-pop
- Years active: 1979–1994, 2003–present
- Labels: SOLAR, MCA
- Members: Bernadette Cooper; Robbin Grider; Joyce Irby; Lynn Malsby; Lorena Shelby
- Past members: Penny Ford; M. Ann Williams; Judy Takeuchi; Cheryl Cooley

Klymaxx is an American all-female pop/R&B band from Los Angeles, California. The band's classic lineup consisted of Bernadette Cooper, Lorena Porter Shelby, Cheryl Cooley, Robbin Grider, Lynn Malsby, and Joyce "Fenderella" Irby. Klymaxx is best known for their 1985 international hits "I Miss You" and "Meeting in the Ladies Room".

== History ==
Klymaxx was created and formed in 1979 by Bernadette Cooper (producer/drummer/vocals); she also created the name Klymaxx. The other original members included Lorena "Lungs" Porter Shelby (lead vocalist), Cheryl Cooley (guitar), Robbin Grider (keyboards/guitar), and Lynn Malsby (keyboards). Joyce "Fenderella" Irby (bass/vocals/producer) joined the band later, before the recording of their debut album. Bernadette developed their core sound and continued becoming the band's figurehead. Their debut album Never Underestimate the Power of a Woman was released in 1981, and their second album was Girls Will Be Girls.

However, their first album to achieve national recognition was 1984 released Meeting in the Ladies Room, featuring the top 5 US Billboard R&B chart success "The Men All Pause", written by Bernadette Cooper and Irby, and the title track. The band's self-produced "I Miss You", penned by Lynn Malsby, became the band's pop breakthrough, peaking at #5 on the Hot 100. Lorena Lungs' vocals gave Klymaxx a clear distinctive sound, while Bernadette Cooper added the spoken word vibe and a musical direction that became their distinctive sound. Critics mentioned that Irby's voice was similar to Michael Jackson's, according to music historian Scot Brown.

The classic lineup disbanded in 1989, though several members regrouped sporadically as Klymaxx over the next five years to release further albums. Following the breakup there was a legal confrontation involving Cooley's unauthorized use of the band's name and trademark, leading to the trademark decision Cheryl Cooley v. Bernadette Cooper and Joyce Irby. The ladies agreed to and also, per the Truth In Music Advertising Act, members are allowed to tour as Klymaxx, but must differentiate which version by adding their names.

Five of the six members from the classic Klymaxx lineup (with Robbin Grider being the one exception) met up together in a 2004 episode of VH1's Bands Reunited, for which they had been invited to perform. Cooley appeared, but due to the unresolved friction/tension with other band members, she was not allowed to perform during the group's concert. Around this time, there was also an SNL episode featuring Halle Berry portraying Cooper. Klymaxx officially reformed shortly afterward, now billed as Klymaxx featuring Bernadette Cooper. Currently, individual members tour under Klymaxx featuring their namesake.

In 2009, all six members of the classic lineup participated in the group's episode of the TV One series Unsung.

On June 25, 2021, Klymaxx was inducted into the Women Songwriters Hall of Fame. All the members of Klymaxx accused the organization of honoring the touring lineup featuring Cheryl Cooley, whose contributions were minimal. Cooper, Malsby, and Joyce Irby noted that Cooley had edited the songwriting shares on ASCAP and Sony Music Publishing, by adding her name to the writing credits or taking sole credit in ASCAP's database. On the same day, Billboard magazine released a follow-up article bringing light to the fraudulent attempt uncovered by ASCAP and Sony ATV publishing.

Recently, renewed interest in Klymaxx's legacy has appeared through social media and streaming platforms, introducing the group's influential catalog to the younger generations. Their status as one of the few all-female R&B/funk bands to play instruments, write, and produce their own music continues to be widely praised in retrospective on women in music.

== Discography ==
=== Studio albums ===
Year	Album	Peak chart positions				Certifications	Record label
Year	Album	US	US R&B	CAN	NZ	Certifications	Record label
1981	Never Underestimate the Power of a Woman	—	—	—	—		SOLAR
1982	Girls Will Be Girls	—	—	—	—		SOLAR
1983	Girls in the Band ^{[A]}	—	—	—	—		SOLAR
1984	Meeting in the Ladies Room	18	9	46	18	RIAA: Gold	Constellation
1986	Klymaxx	98	25	—	—		Constellation
1990	The Maxx Is Back	168	32	—	—		MCA
1994	One Day	—	—	—	—		Valley Vue
"—" denotes releases that did not chart or were not released in that territory.

- ^{A} Album was never released

=== Compilation albums ===
- Greatest Hits (1996, MCA)
- 20th Century Masters - The Millennium Collection: The Best of Klymaxx (2003, MCA)

=== Singles ===
Year	Title	Peak chart positions									Certifications	Album
Year	Title	US	US R&B	US Dan	US A/C	BEL	CAN	NLD	NZ	UK	Certifications	Album
1981	"Never Underestimate the Power of a Woman"	—	74	—	—	—	—	—	—	—		Never Underestimate the Power of a Woman
1981	"I Want to Love You Tonight"	—	—	—	—	—	—	—	—	—		Never Underestimate the Power of a Woman
1982	"Heartbreaker (I'm Such a Mess)"	—	—	—	—	—	—	—	—	—		Girls Will Be Girls
1982	"Wild Girls"	—	78	—	—	—	—	—	—	—		Girls Will Be Girls
1983	"Multi-Purpose Girl"	—	—	—	—	—	—	—	—	—		Girls in the Band
1984	"The Men All Pause"	105	5	9	—	—	—	—	—	—		Meeting in the Ladies Room
1985	"Meeting in the Ladies Room"	59	4	22	—	—	—	—	—	—		Meeting in the Ladies Room
1985	"Lock and Key"	—	47	—	—	—	—	—	—	—		Meeting in the Ladies Room
1985	"I Miss You"	5	11	—	3	28	1	32	2	89	MC: Gold	Meeting in the Ladies Room
1986	"The Men All Pause" (re-release)	80	—	—	—	—	—	—	—	—		Meeting in the Ladies Room
1986	"Man Size Love"	15	43	18	—	—	55	—	—	86		Klymaxx
1986	"Sexy"	—	18	—	—	—	—	—	—	—		Klymaxx
1987	"I'd Still Say Yes"	18	7	—	8	—	50	—	—	—		Klymaxx
1987	"Divas Need Love Too"	—	14	—	—	—	—	—	—	—		Klymaxx
1990	"Good Love"	—	4	—	—	—	—	—	—	89		The Maxx Is Back
1990	"Private Party"	—	62	—	—	—	—	—	—	—		The Maxx Is Back
1990	"When You Kiss Me"	—	—	—	—	—	—	—	—	—		The Maxx Is Back
1994	"All I Think About Is You"	—	124	—	—	—	—	—	—	—		One Day
"—" denotes releases that did not chart or were not released in that territory.
