= Calloway (band) =

American R&B duo

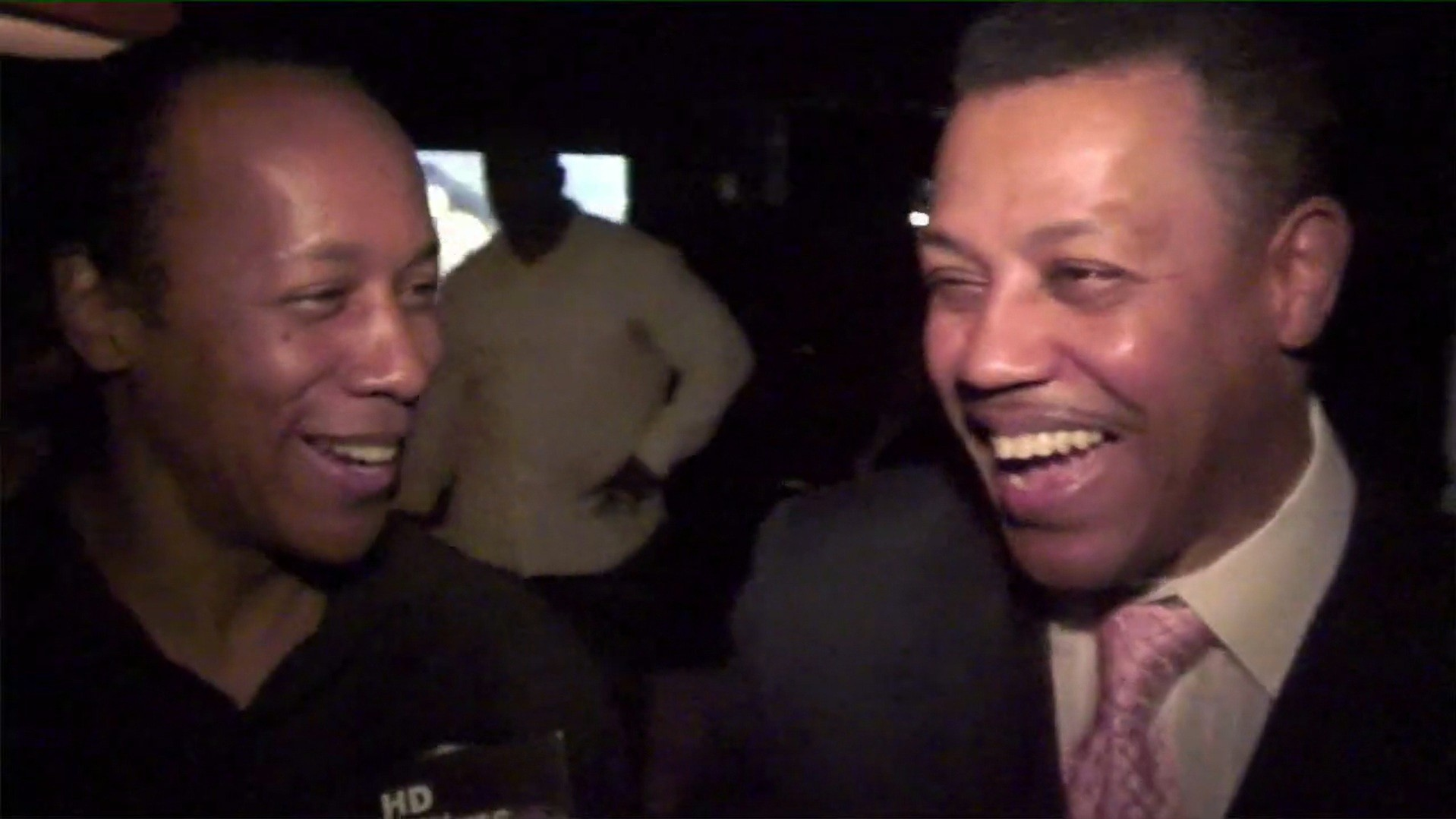
- Vincent (left) and Reggie Calloway in 2009

Background information
- Origin: Cincinnati, Ohio, U.S.
- Genre: R&B
- Years active: 1987–present
- Labels: SOLAR; Epic
- Members: Reggie Calloway; Vincent Calloway

Calloway is an American R&B duo from Cincinnati, Ohio, consisting of brothers, Reggie Calloway (born January 23, 1955) and Vincent Calloway (born January 5, 1957). They had a major hit in 1990 with "I Wanna Be Rich".

== Biography ==
The brothers grew up around music with a father who played the trumpet, an uncle who played keyboards, and an aunt who sang opera. As teenagers, they began writing songs and forming bands, and when attending Kentucky State University, they formed Midnight Star, a synth-funk outfit that hit big in the early to mid 1980s. The Calloways were instrumental in orchestrating the band's 1983 multi-platinum breakthrough album, No Parking on the Dance Floor, and Midnight Star would continue to experience mainstream success throughout the brothers' tenure in the group.

After Midnight Star ran its course, the two left to focus on solo work. During their time with Midnight Star, they had also written and produced hits for acts like Klymaxx ("Meeting in the Ladies Room") and The Whispers ("Contagious"). Following their exit from Star, they continued writing for other musicians, such as Teddy Pendergrass ("Joy"), Gladys Knight & the Pips ("Love Overboard"), Natalie Cole ("Jump Start"), and Levert ("Casanova"), before forming their own eponymous group, Calloway, in the late 1980s. As Calloway, the duo scored a number two Billboard Hot 100 hit and number five soul hit with "I Wanna Be Rich". After scoring with the follow-ups "Sir Lancelot" (Top 20 R&B), "All the Way" and "Let's Get Smooth" (both R&B Top 40 hits), the hits dried up and the Calloways concentrated on production work. Reginald Calloway is now the Music Director of Royalty fund for Sound Royalties.

== Discography ==
=== Albums ===
Year	Album	Peak chart positions	
Year	Album	US	US R&B
1989	All the Way	80	—
1992	Let's Get Smooth	42	89

=== Singles ===
Year	Single	Peak chart positions				
Year	Single	US R&B	US Adult	US	AUS	UK
1990	"All the Way"	39	—	63	—	—
1990	"Sir Lancelot"	19	—	―	—	―
1990	"We Can't Go Wrong"	―	—	―	—	—
1990	"I Wanna Be Rich"	5	20	2	60	100
1990	"You Are My Everything"	―	―	―	―	―
1992	"Let's Get Smooth"	33	—	―	—	—
2024	"I Wanna Be Rich (Anniversary)"	―	―	―	―	―
2025	"Freak-A-Zoid (Reboot)"	―	―	―	―	―
2025	"6 Pack"	―	―	―	―	―
"—" denotes releases that did not chart or were not released.
