= Midnight Star (band) =

American music group

- Origin: Frankfort, Kentucky, U.S.
- Genres: Electro-funk, soul, disco, R&B
- Years active: 1976–1990, 2000–present
- Label: SOLAR
- Members: Belinda Lipscomb; Melvin Gentry; Kenneth Gant; Bobby Lovelace; Bo Watson; Bill Simmons
- Past members: Reggie Calloway; Vincent Calloway; Jeff Cooper

Midnight Star is an American musical group.

== Band history ==
The group was formed in 1976 at Kentucky State University by trumpeter Reggie Calloway, vocalist Belinda Lipscomb, guitarist/drummer/vocalist Melvin Gentry, bassist Kenneth Gant, multi-instrumentalist Bill Simmons, keyboard player/vocalist Bo Watson and guitarist/keyboardist Jeff Cooper, as a self-contained group. They later added non-KSU student trombonist Vincent Calloway (Reginald's younger brother). A 1978 New York City showcase inspired SOLAR Records chief Dick Griffey to sign the group. They released their debut album The Beginning (1980) with some studio musicians. In 1981 their second album, released on Solar Records, Standing Together, reached position #54 on the U.S. R&B chart. In 1982 they released the album Victory. Using elected band leader Reggie Calloway's production skills, Midnight Star hit the U.S. R&B chart with early singles "Hot Spot" and "I've Been Watching You". Drummer Bobby Lovelace joined the group in late 1982, freeing Gentry to sing and play guitar exclusively.

Midnight Star's fourth album, No Parking on the Dance Floor, was released in 1983, and proved to be their breakout. Featuring a mix of R&B and funk with vocoder vocals, the album hit No. 2 on the Billboard magazine Top Black Albums chart and No. 27 on the Billboard Top LPs & Tape and it went double platinum in the U.S. Its first single, "Freak-A-Zoid", went to No. 2 on the U.S. Black Singles chart. The Washington Post's J. D. Considine argues that this song served to "establish [the] group's stylistic identity" and that it "put Midnight Star on the pop music map because it so perfectly combined the group's technopop tendencies with its R&B roots" Other singles from the album included "Wet My Whistle", and the title track. The album's three singles all charted on Billboard's Hot 100, Black Singles and dance charts. and the album tracks "Slow Jam" (co-written by Kenneth "Babyface" Edmonds) and "Electricity" received significant airplay.

Planetary Invasion had the same "basic sound...from the chattering electronic pulse to Vincent Calloway's chatty vocoder" as the band's previous release and also went platinum. "Operator", the first single, made the pop top 20 and the number one spot on the R&B chart; it remains the band's only Billboard top 40 hit to date.

In 1985, Midnight Star, Kool & the Gang, Shalamar and Klymaxx performed at the Marriott Convention Center in Oklahoma City. The band continued to do concerts in San Antonio and Little Rock.

In 1986 the band released the Headlines, which was their third album to sell at least gold. It was to be their last with the Calloway brothers. Due to irreconcilable differences with the other members, Reggie was out of the group, and Vincent left shortly thereafter. They achieved their biggest success in the UK with "Midas Touch", which made #8, and "Headlines", a #16 hit earlier the same year. Without the Calloways who formed the group Calloway and released an album that spawned the 1990 hit single "I Wanna Be Rich", Midnight Star recorded two more albums, the self-titled Midnight Star and Work It Out. These two albums proved not as successful as their previous three releases, but the singles "Don't Rock the Boat" and "Snake in the Grass" did reach the top ten on the R&B singles chart. The group went on a long hiatus, though they never officially broke up.

The group reunited in 2000 with many of the original members (including all of the singers) and released the album 15th Avenue two years later. Since then, the group has toured sporadically, most recently with a lineup that includes Belinda Lipscomb, Kenneth Gant, Melvin Gentry, Bo Watson, and Bobby Lovelace, with Bill Simmons sometimes joining as well.

== Outside work ==
Outside of Midnight Star, a few band members have contributed to other projects. Bo Watson co-wrote a few songs for singer Toni Braxton. He co-wrote the Babyface duet "Give U My Heart" and "Love Shoulda Brought You Home" from the Boomerang soundtrack as well as the song "Spending My Time with You" on Braxton's self-titled debut. Watson also helped write other songs such as "Turn Down the Lights" for Shanice, "Rock Steady" for The Whispers and "Meeting in the Ladies' Room" for Klymaxx.

Reggie and Vincent Calloway have produced acts such as LeVert, Teddy Pendergrass and the Deele.

Belinda Lipscomb appears on Reflection Eternal's 2010 album Revolutions Per Minute on the track "Long Hot Summer" as well as the second single "In This World". Lipscomb also contributed additional background vocals on "Toyz N Da Hood" from Snoop Dogg's 2011 album Doggumentary. Lipscomb also wrote the track "Let's Keep Dancin'" by Carrie Lucas for her final LP "Horsin' Around".

== Discography ==
=== Studio albums ===
Year	Album	Peak chart positions					Certifications (sales thresholds)	Record label
Year	Album	US Pop	US R&B	NLD	NZ	UK	Certifications (sales thresholds)	Record label
1980	The Beginning	—	—	—	—	—		SOLAR
1981	Standing Together	—	54	—	—	—		SOLAR
1982	Victory	205	58	—	—	—		SOLAR
1983	No Parking on the Dance Floor	27	2	—	30	—	RIAA: 2× Platinum	SOLAR
1984	Planetary Invasion	32	7	—	44	85	RIAA: Gold	SOLAR
1986	Headlines	56	7	69	39	42	RIAA: Gold	SOLAR
1988	Midnight Star	96	14	—	—	—		SOLAR
1990	Work It Out	—	41	—	—	—		SOLAR
2002	15th Avenue	—	—	—	—	—		Reel Star
"—" denotes a recording that did not chart or was not released in that territory.

=== Compilation albums ===
- Greatest Hits (1987, SOLAR)
- Anniversary Collection (1999, The Right Stuff)
- The Best of Midnight Star (2002, EMI-Capitol)
- Ultimate Collection (2006, Capitol)

=== Singles ===
Year	Single	Peak chart positions							Album
Year	Single	US	US R&B	US Dan	AUS	NLD	NZ	UK	Album
1980	"Make It Last"	—	85	—	—	—	—	—	The Beginning
1980	"You're the Star"	—	—	—	—	—	—	—	The Beginning
1981	"I've Been Watching You"	—	36	—	—	—	—	—	Standing Together
1981	"Tuff"	—	60	—	—	—	—	—	Standing Together
1982	"Can't Give You Up"	—	—	—	—	—	—	—	Standing Together
1982	"Hot Spot"	108	35	—	—	—	—	—	Victory
1982	"Victory"	—	83	—	—	—	—	—	Victory
1983	"Freak-A-Zoid"	66	2	44	—	—	3	—	No Parking on the Dance Floor
1983	"Wet My Whistle"	61	8	15	—	—	—	60	No Parking on the Dance Floor
1984	"No Parking (On the Dance Floor)"	81	43	44	—	—	—	—	No Parking on the Dance Floor
1984	"Night Rider"	—	—	—	—	—	—	—	No Parking on the Dance Floor
1984	"Operator"	18	1	15	—	—	—	66	Planetary Invasion
1985	"Scientific Love"	80	16	19	—	—	—	—	Planetary Invasion
1985	"Curious"	—	—	—	—	—	—	92	Planetary Invasion
1985	"Body Snatchers"	—	31	—	—	—	—	—	Planetary Invasion
1986	"Headlines"	69	3	34	—	—	—	16	Headlines
1986	"Midas Touch"	42	7	—	—	29	—	8	Headlines
1986	"Engine No. 9"	—	11	—	—	81	—	64	Headlines
1987	"Stay Here by My Side"	—	—	—	—	—	—	—	Headlines
1987	"Do the Prep"	—	—	—	—	—	—	—	Penitentiary III
1988	"Don't Rock the Boat" (feat. Ecstasy of Whodini)	—	3	—	—	36	—	—	Midnight Star
1988	"Snake in the Grass"	—	10	—	—	—	—	—	Midnight Star
1989	"Love Song"	—	55	—	—	—	—	—	Midnight Star
1990	"Do It (One More Time)"	—	12	—	—	—	—	—	Work It Out
1990	"Luv-U-Up"	—	58	—	—	—	—	—	Work It Out
1990	"Red Roses"	—	—	—	—	—	—	—	Work It Out
2005	"Midas Touch" (Australian maxi single including Starskee remix)	—	—	—	11	—	—	—	Non-album singles
2013	"Unity" (with Bootsy Collins, Shirley Murdock, Zapp, Eddie Levert)	—	—	—	—	—	—	—	Non-album singles
"—" denotes a recording that did not chart or was not released in that territory.
