= Joyce Irby =

American singer, musician (born 1956)

Joyce "Fenderella" Irby
- Also known as: Fenderella
- Born: Joyce Darlene Irby; July 27, 1956 (age 70)
- Origin: Eatonville, Florida, U.S. Los Angeles, California, U.S.
- Genres: R&B, soul, jazz-funk, pop, smooth soul
- Occupations: Singer, songwriter, musician, record producer, artist developer
- Instruments: Vocals, piano, bass guitar
- Years active: 1970s–present
- Labels: Motown Records; MCA Records
- Website: www.jamsforanimals.org

Joyce "Fenderella" Irby (born Joyce Darlene Irby; July 27, 1956 in Orlando, Florida) is an American singer, songwriter, bass guitarist and producer. She was the co-lead vocalist of the all-female band Klymaxx. Irby has also worked with artists such as Lloyd, Troop, Sammie, the SOS Band and Shalamar.

== Career ==
In her teenage years, she used to stand outside concert arenas in the South with her bass around her neck, playing on loading ramps. There she was first noticed by George Clinton. He used to make her sit with him after concerts, encouraging her by listening to her play.

=== George Clinton/P-Funk Collective ===
She originally signed on with George Clinton's P-Funk Collective as "Fenderella". While she never featured on any Funkadelic/George Clinton albums, she considers him her lifetime friend and mentor.

=== Klymaxx ===
Dick Griffey, president of Solar Records, saw Irby perform on a loading ramp and asked Leon Sylvers, the producer, if he could contact her. They were in search of a female bass player for their new group Klymaxx.

Jimmy Jam heard her singing while he was playing piano in the studio with the girls which led her to the opportunity to lead Klymaxx songs. She was the lead singer on 3 of Klymaxx's 4 biggest records, including their biggest hit "I Miss You". She also penned and recorded the group's first hit, "The Men All Pause".

=== Solo work ===
In 1989, she scored a solo deal with Motown Records and had three charting Billboard singles, most notable "Mr. DJ" (with Doug E. Fresh) which peaked at No. 2. All were included on the album Maximum Thrust, released the same year.

In 2012, Irby scored a top 5 Billboard hit as a co-writer with the Fat Joe/Chris Brown song, "Another Round".

=== Diva One Productions ===
Irby relocated from Los Angeles to Atlanta in the mid-1980s and began to attempt the rise of Atlanta as an urban music center by soliciting major record labels and producers Jimmy Jam and Terry Lewis, and L.A. Reid and Babyface to form regional offices in the area.

There, she founded Diva One Productions, a production and publishing company. Her greatest impact in this respect, may have been the result of her signing a 16 year-old Dallas Austin as a songwriter and producer in 1988. Dallas produced the first TLC and Boyz II Men projects while still signed to Irby's company.

She then signed child star Sammie Bush, to a deal with Dallas and Capitol Records launching his career when he was 12 years old.

Irby also signed Lloyd (The Inc) as an 11-year-old and developed and guided his career through four major record deals (Warner, DreamWorks, Magic Johnson Music/MCA, The Inc/Universal).

Irby gave writer/producer Jasper Cameron his first songwriting deal.

=== Honors and awards ===
Irby won an ASCAP songwriter award in 2012 for co-penning one of the most played urban records in the US, the top 5 single "Another Round" by Fat Joe, Chris Brown and Mary J. Blige.

== Personal life ==
An avid animal lover, Irby started her own charity "Jams for Animals", to raise consciousness and promote kindness to animals through music and video.
