= 2008 Universal Studios fire =

Fire in Los Angeles County, California, U.S.

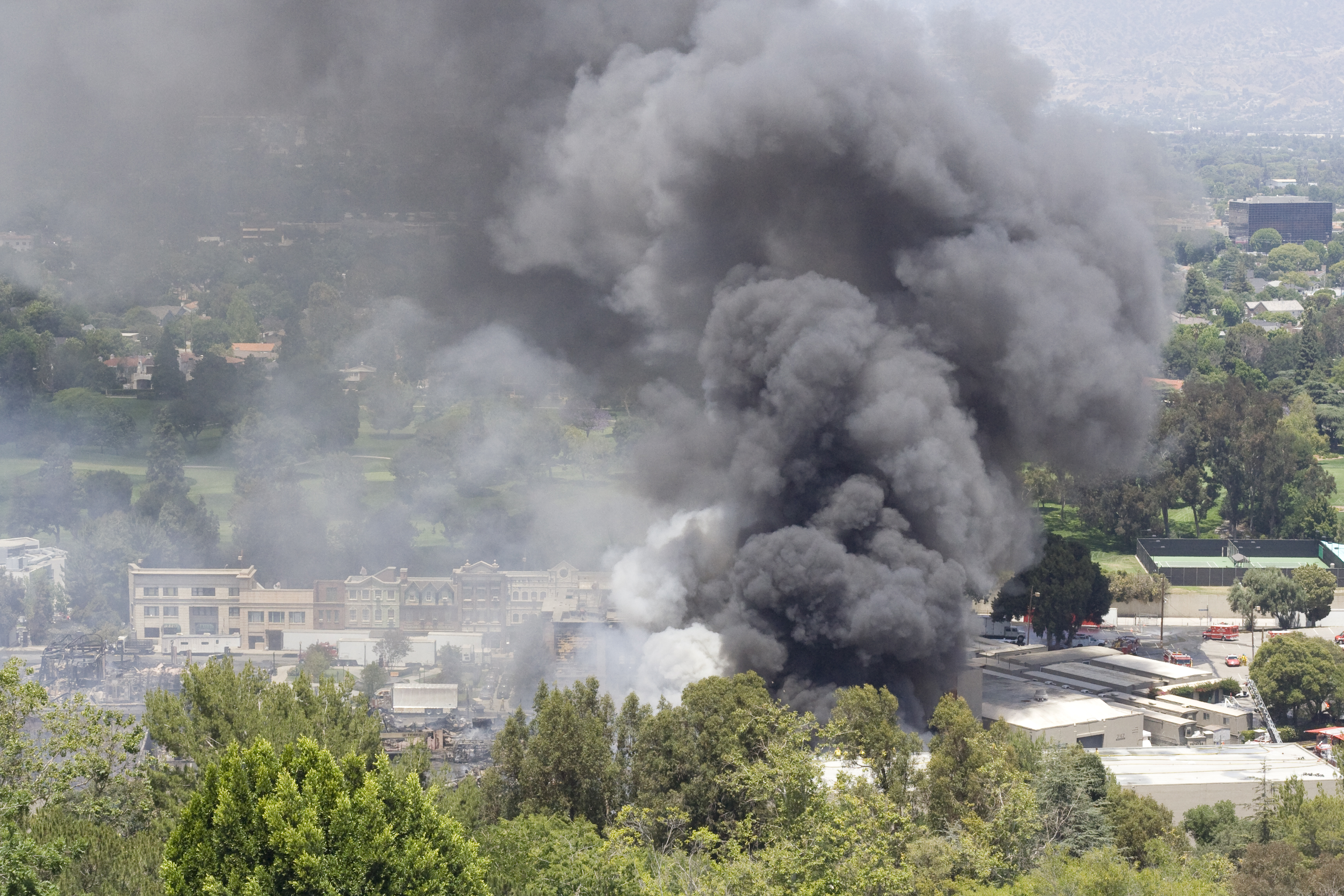
- Date: June 1, 2008; 18 years ago
- Location: Universal Studios Hollywood, Los Angeles County, California, U.S.; 34°08′28″N 118°21′02″W
- Cause: Heated asphalt shingle
- Outcome: Destruction of three acres of Universal backlot, King Kong Encounter, original master tapes for popular music, and digital TV and film backups. Injury of nine firefighters and an LA County sheriff's deputy.
- Deaths: 0
- Injuries: 17

On June 1, 2008, a fire broke out on the backlot of Universal Studios Hollywood, an American film studio and theme park in the San Fernando Valley area of Los Angeles County, California. The fire began when a worker used a blowtorch to warm asphalt shingles that were being applied to a facade. The worker left before checking that all spots had cooled, and as a result, a three-alarm fire broke out. Nine firefighters and a Los Angeles County sheriff's deputy sustained minor injuries. The fire was extinguished after 24 hours.

Universal Pictures said the fire destroyed a three-acre (1.2 ha) portion of the Universal backlot, including the attraction King Kong Encounter and 40,000 to 50,000 archived digital video and film copies. A 2019 exposé from The New York Times Magazine asserted that the fire also destroyed 118,000 to 175,000 audio master tapes belonging to Universal Music Group (UMG), Universal's former division and NBCUniversal's then-sister company through Vivendi, a shareholder with General Electric until 2009. This included original recordings belonging to some of the best-selling artists worldwide. UMG disputed the report, though the CEO, Lucian Grainge, acknowledged that "the loss of even a single piece of archived material is heartbreaking".

== Fire ==
On June 1, 2008, a three-alarm fire broke out on the Universal Studios Lot, the backlot of Universal Studios. The fire started when a worker was using a blowtorch to warm asphalt shingles being applied to a facade. Among the structures damaged by the fire were mock New York and New England streets, the King Kong Encounter attraction, the Courthouse Square featured in Back to the Future and the Universal video vault.

The Los Angeles County Fire Department (LACoFD) sent 516 firefighters, as well as two helicopters dropping water. Nine firefighters and a Los Angeles County sheriff's deputy sustained minor injuries. The fire took at least 12 hours to extinguish, in part because of the low water pressure due to the low capacity of Universal's pipes; firefighters had to tap streams and lakes. The fire was extinguished after 24 hours.

Universal executives initially said the fire destroyed 40,000 to 50,000 archived digital video and film copies of Universal movies and television shows, some almost a century old, and including the films Knocked Up and Atonement, the NBC series Law & Order, The Office, and Miami Vice, and the CBS series I Love Lucy. Universal Studios president Ron Meyer told the media that "nothing irreplaceable was lost" and that the company already possessed duplicates of everything that had been destroyed. Universal replaced the King Kong attraction with King Kong: 360 3-D, based on the 2005 King Kong film.

== 2019 New York Times report ==
In June 2019, The New York Times Magazine published an investigative article by freelance journalist Jody Rosen that alleged that the damage was far more serious than originally reported, as Meyer's statement only referred to material owned by Universal Studios.

The fire destroyed Building 6197, a warehouse adjoining the King Kong attraction. In addition to more videos, it housed a huge archive containing multiple copies of audio and video recordings, documents ranging from legal papers to liner notes, and packaging materials and artwork belonging to Universal Music Group (UMG). The collection included the catalogues of UMG's West Coast labels including Chess, Decca, MCA, Geffen, Interscope, A&M, Impulse!, and their subsidiary labels.

Rosen estimated the individual items lost range from 118,000 to 175,000 album and 45-rpm single master tapes, phonograph master discs, lacquers (also known as acetates), and all the documentation contained in the tape boxes. The article alleged some tapes contained unreleased recordings such as outtakes, alternative versions of released material, and instrumental "submaster" multitracks created for dubbing and mixdown. However, UMG found only one unreleased album potentially affected in the fire, and they located multiple copies of that recording and could still release that album in the future if the artist wishes to. Randy Aronson, manager of the vault at the time, estimates that the masters of as many as 500,000 individual tracks were lost.

Rosen argued master recordings are irreplaceable, even if copies exist, because the original recording "contains the record's details in their purest form," citing Andy Zax, a Grammy-nominated producer and writer who works on reissued recordings. UMG stated that even when the original master is available, the company often works from duplicates or digitized versions because the fidelity of the original master has deteriorated from overuse or from chemical interactions over time or for other technical reasons. UMG said it reissues thousands of recordings a year, and each project presents a unique set of challenges to overcome. In each case, UMG's team of experts use the highest fidelity recordings possible.

Among the possible losses were the entire AVI Records catalog, all of Decca's masters from the 1930s to the 1950s, most of the original Chess masters, which included artists such as Chuck Berry, Muddy Waters, and Howlin' Wolf, as well as most of John Coltrane's master tapes from his period signed to Impulse! Records. On Twitter, Rosen stated that the Coltrane masters were among the most checked-out Impulse! items in the vault, and a source had told him that the masters for A Love Supreme were likely elsewhere during the fire.

Two weeks later, Rosen wrote a follow-up article, listing at least 700 additional artists named in internal UMG documents as possibly affected. Determining which recordings had been destroyed, or how much of an artist's discography had been affected, was impossible, he wrote. For example, Rosen said it was difficult to confirm whether the Neil Young recordings listed in the documents were the original master tapes of the albums he recorded for Geffen Records in the 1980s, or session outtakes from those records. Rosen tweeted that the documents also listed several Broadway cast recordings among the tapes destroyed. Several nonmusical audio recordings were reported as destroyed, including the original recording of Martin Luther King Jr.'s 1968 "Remaining Awake During a Great Revolution" sermon delivered at the Washington National Cathedral.

In his second article, Rosen acknowledged he could not definitely state that any master recordings had actually been lost in the fire, stating "It is not possible to assert definitively which masters were burned in the fire, nor can it be said categorically that all of these artists did in fact lose masters. It also cannot be determined exactly how many of the destroyed masters were primary-source originals."

=== Artists' responses ===
Bryan Adams, Semisonic drummer Jacob Slichter, and Counting Crows singer Adam Duritz said they had been told that UMG had misplaced their tapes. In the early 2020s, HBO approached Geffen Records to make a documentary on Counting Crows and the label found all of the masters, confirming they had not been destroyed. Richard Carpenter told the Times he had been informed about the destruction of his tapes by a UMG employee while he was working on a reissue, and only after Carpenter had made multiple, persistent inquiries. Following the publication of Rosen's articles, several affected musicians posted reactions on social media, with some noting specific tapes that may have been lost. For instance, singer-songwriter Jill Sobule said she had lost two masters in the fire, including tapes for an unreleased album produced by Joe Jackson, but Sobule later said UMG informed her that none of her tapes had been lost, including the unreleased album.

Several other artists also contradicted The Times' reporting, stating their recordings had not been affected by the fire. Nirvana said on Twitter that all of their tapes are safe as did Sheryl Crow, with UMG confirming, "masters for all of Crow's A&M-released albums survived the fire." The Canadian band the Tragically Hip reported on their website that The New York Times incorrectly listed them among those who had lost tapes in the fire. Drummer Johnny Fay wrote that all of their material had been relocated to Canada in 2001. Beck posted that his losses were minimal and that none of his master recordings had been lost. Smash Mouth confirmed their recordings were not destroyed.

Within two weeks of Rosen's article, five plaintiffs (singer-songwriter Steve Earle, the estates of Tupac Shakur and Tom Petty, and the bands Hole and Soundgarden) filed a class-action lawsuit in federal court against UMG. In their complaint, the plaintiffs claimed UMG never told artists about the effects of the fire and had breached their contracts by failing to properly secure its master tape collection. They further alleged that UMG did not share insurance or legal payouts received as a result of the fire. Every plaintiff except for Tom Petty's ex-wife dropped out of the complaint after UMG provided artists with a list of their recordings in the company's archives.

On July 17, Universal moved to dismiss the class-action lawsuit. On August 16, 2019, Hole dropped out of the lawsuit after UMG assured them that the band's masters were not affected by the fire. Slightly over a month later, UMG also claimed that Shakur, Earle, and Petty did not lose their masters in the fire, and that an investigation with Soundgarden was still going on. Shakur and Earle would also later drop out as plaintiffs after learning their master tapes had not been harmed.

Five days later, UMG demanded Soundgarden drop the suit, which the label had also moved to dismiss, citing documentary proof that the label had informed the band about the lost masters in 2015 and accusing their lawyer of "[failing] to conduct presuit diligence in your rush to be the first to file." The surviving band members declined. "Their arbitrary deadlines have zero force or effect," Howard King, their attorney, told Rolling Stone. "Until UMG reveals what it collected for their litigation claims to extensive damage to master recordings, we cannot accept their belated claim that no damages were actually suffered."

UMG's dismissal motion publicly confirmed that master tapes for Soundgarden's Badmotorfinger album had been destroyed in the fire, and that members of the group had been made aware of the destruction in 2015 while they were working on a remaster of the album that was eventually completed with a backup safety copy. In December 2019, district court judge John Kronstadt ruled that Universal must hand over discovery evidence, and denied the label's request to postpone the delivery.

In March 2020, Soundgarden and the Shakur estate dropped out of the class action against UMG. On March 23, Steve Earle dropped out, leaving Tom Petty's widow as the only remaining plaintiff. The lawsuit was dismissed by Kronstadt on April 6, 2020, with a refiled complaint dismissed with prejudice on March 29, 2021. After the lawsuit was dismissed, UMG said The Times "has a responsibility to explain why its editors continue to stand behind a story that has been disproven with incontrovertible evidence from both UMG and many of the artists named in the story."

=== UMG response ===
Since its publication, UMG has disputed Rosen's article, saying it contained "numerous inaccuracies" and "fundamental misunderstandings of the scope of the incident and affected assets". UMG said it was unable to disclose details due to "constraints".

In a Billboard interview, UMG archivist Patrick Kraus said that several masters of John Coltrane, Muddy Waters, and Ahmad Jamal recordings, plus items from the catalogs of Nashboro Records, Chess Records, and Impulse! Records survived the fire and were still in Universal's archive. Rosen responded in his June 25 piece, noting that some of the masters that Kraus had mentioned may have survived the fire because they were being used for remastering projects at the time, or were not the primary source master. Aronson confirmed to Rosen that the vast majority of items in the vault at the time of the fire were original, primary source master recordings. UMG stated the vault, which mostly contained duplicate tapes and not original masters, was a third empty at the time of the fire because the company had already begun transferring assets to its Iron Mountain facility.

In an email to staff following the publication of Rosen's story, Lucian Grainge said he was forming a team of researchers to provide artists with definitive information and confirmed that UMG had suffered a serious loss of archival material. Grainge wrote: "While I've been somewhat relieved by early reports from our team that many of the assertions and subsequent speculation are not accurate, one thing is clear: the loss of even a single piece of archived material is heartbreaking." He wrote that it was "completely unacceptable" that their artists did not know the details and pledged to deliver "answers". On June 26, Kraus issued a memo to staff which detailed UMG's plan to determine which assets had been affected.

A month after the story broke, Kraus issued an internal note to Universal staff, which claimed that his research at the time had found only 22 original master recordings by five artists had been lost in the fire, and that backup copies had been found for each lost master. He added that UMG had been fielding requests from over 200 artists and their representatives. Kraus said his team had reviewed over 26,000 assets by 30 artists, of which 424 assets (including 349 audio recordings) might have been lost. On November 4, 2019, Scott Edelman of Gibson Dunn, an attorney for UMG, told U.S. District Judge John A. Kronstadt that UMG is the owner of the recordings and that artists' contracts provide for payments through royalties, not insurance claims.

A February 2020 court filing by UMG confirmed that master tapes from at least 19 artists had been damaged or destroyed in the fire. The artists whom UMG confirmed were affected are Bryan Adams, ...And You Will Know Us by the Trail of Dead, David Baerwald, Beck, Sheryl Crow, Peter Frampton, Jimmy Eat World, Elton John, Michael McDonald, Nirvana, Les Paul, R.E.M., Slayer, Sonic Youth, Soundgarden, the Surfaris, Suzanne Vega, White Zombie and Y&T. However, Billboard wrote that "UMG says original digital master recordings for Nirvana, Beck, Bryan Adams, Sheryl Crow, Jimmy Eat World, Suzanne Vega, White Zombie and Yesterday & Today were affected, but it has replacements or digital clones of these assets. R.E.M had one song from a soundtrack affected but UMG has copies in the same format."

== List of artists affected, according to The New York Times ==
According to The New York Times Magazine, artists whose original master recordings were destroyed in whole or part in the 2008 fire include:

- 38 Special
- 50 Cent
- Colonel Abrams
- Johnny Ace
- Bryan Adams
- Nat Adderley
- Aerosmith
- Rhett Akins
- Manny Albam
- Lorez Alexandria
- Gary Allan
- Red Allen
- Steve Allen
- Ames Brothers
- Gene Ammons
- Bill Anderson
- John Anderson
- The Andrews Sisters
- Lee Andrews & the Hearts
- Paul Anka
- Adam Ant
- Toni Arden
- Joan Armatrading
- Louis Armstrong
- Asia
- Asleep at the Wheel
- Audioslave
- Patti Austin
- Average White Band
- Hoyt Axton
- Albert Ayler
- Burt Bacharach
- Joan Baez
- Razzy Bailey
- Chet Baker
- Florence Ballard
- Hank Ballard
- Gato Barbieri
- Baja Marimba Band
- The Banana Splits
- Len Barry
- Count Basie
- Fontella Bass
- The Beat Farmers
- Sidney Bechet
- Beck
- Captain Beefheart
- Archie Bell & the Drells
- Vincent Bell
- Bell Biv DeVoe
- Louie Bellson
- David Benoit
- George Benson
- Berlin
- Elmer Bernstein
- Chuck Berry
- Nuno Bettencourt
- Stephen Bishop
- Blackstreet
- Art Blakey
- Hal Blaine
- Bobby "Blue" Bland
- Mary J. Blige
- The Blind Boys of Alabama
- Blink-182
- Blues Traveler
- Eddie Bo
- Pat Boone
- Boston
- Connee Boswell
- Eddie Boyd
- Jan Bradley
- Owen Bradley
- Oscar Brand
- Bob Braun
- Walter Brennan
- Jackie Brenston
- Teresa Brewer
- Edie Brickell & New Bohemians
- John Brim
- Willmer "Little Ax" Broadnax
- Lonnie Brooks
- Big Bill Broonzy
- Brothers Johnson
- Bobby Brown
- Clarence "Gatemouth" Brown
- Lawrence Brown
- Les Brown
- Marion Brown
- Marshall Brown
- Mel Brown
- Michael Brown
- Dave Brubeck
- Jimmy Buffett
- Carol Burnett
- T-Bone Burnett
- Dorsey Burnette
- Johnny Burnette
- Terry Callier
- Cab Calloway
- The Call
- Glen Campbell
- Captain & Tennille
- Captain Sensible
- Irene Cara
- Belinda Carlisle
- Carl Carlton
- Eric Carmen
- Hoagy Carmichael
- Kim Carnes
- Karen Carpenter
- Richard Carpenter
- The Carpenters
- Barbara Carr
- Benny Carter
- Betty Carter
- Carter Family
- Peter Case
- Alvin Cash
- Rosanne Cash
- Bobby Charles
- Ray Charles
- Chubby Checker
- Checkmates, Ltd.
- Cheech & Chong
- Cher
- Don Cherry
- Mark Chesnutt
- The Chi-Lites
- Eric Clapton
- Gene Clark
- Petula Clark
- Roy Clark
- Merry Clayton
- Jimmy Cliff
- Patsy Cline
- Rosemary Clooney
- Wayne Cochran
- Joe Cocker
- Gloria Coleman
- Ornette Coleman
- Mitty Collier
- Jazzbo Collins
- Judy Collins
- Colosseum
- Alice Coltrane
- John Coltrane
- Common
- Cookie and his Cupcakes
- Barbara Cook
- Rita Coolidge
- Stewart Copeland
- The Corsairs
- Dave "Baby" Cortez
- Bill Cosby
- Don Costa
- Clifford Coulter
- Counting Crows
- Coverdale•Page
- Warren Covington
- Deborah Cox
- James "Sugar Boy" Crawford
- Crazy Otto
- Marshall Crenshaw
- The Crew-Cuts
- Sonny Criss
- Bing Crosby
- Bob Crosby
- David Crosby
- Crosby & Nash
- Sheryl Crow
- Rodney Crowell
- The Crusaders
- The Cuff Links
- Xavier Cugat
- Tim Curry
- The Damned
- Danny & The Juniors
- Rodney Dangerfield
- Bobby Darin
- Helen Darling
- David & David
- Billy Davis Jr.
- Mac Davis
- Richard Davis
- Sammy Davis Jr.
- Chris de Burgh
- Lenny Dee
- Jack DeJohnette
- The Dells
- The Del-Vikings
- Sandy Denny
- Sugar Pie DeSanto
- The Desert Rose Band
- Dennis DeYoung
- Neil Diamond
- Bo Diddley
- Difford & Tilbrook
- Dillard & Clark
- The Dixie Hummingbirds
- Willie Dixon
- DJ Shadow
- Fats Domino
- Jimmy Donley
- Kenny Dorham
- Jimmy Dorsey
- Lee Dorsey
- Tommy Dorsey
- Lamont Dozier
- The Dramatics
- The Dream Syndicate
- The Dream Weavers
- Roy Drusky
- Jimmy Durante
- Deanna Durbin
- Eagles
- Steve Earle
- El Chicano
- Danny Elfman
- Yvonne Elliman
- Duke Ellington
- Cass Elliot
- Joe Ely
- John Entwistle
- Eminem
- Eric B. & Rakim
- Gil Evans
- Paul Evans
- Betty Everett
- Don Everly
- Extreme
- The Falcons
- Harold Faltermeyer
- Donna Fargo
- Art Farmer
- Freddy Fender
- Ferrante & Teicher
- Fever Tree
- The 5th Dimension
- Ella Fitzgerald
- The Fixx
- The Flamingos
- King Floyd
- The Flying Burrito Brothers
- John Fogerty
- Red Foley
- Eddie Fontaine
- The Four Aces
- Four Tops
- Peter Frampton
- Franke and the Knockouts
- Aretha Franklin
- C. L. Franklin
- Frazier River
- The Free Movement
- Glenn Frey
- Lefty Frizzell
- Curtis Fuller
- Jerry Fuller
- Lowell Fulson
- Harvey Fuqua
- Nelly Furtado
- Hank Garland
- Judy Garland
- Erroll Garner
- Jimmy Garrison
- Larry Gatlin
- Gene Loves Jezebel
- Barry Gibb
- Georgia Gibbs
- Terri Gibbs
- Dizzy Gillespie
- Gin Blossoms
- Tompall Glaser
- Glass Harp
- Tom Glazer
- Whoopi Goldberg
- Golden Earring
- Paul Gonsalves
- Benny Goodman
- Dexter Gordon
- Rosco Gordon
- Eydie Gormé
- Lesley Gore
- Teddy Grace
- Grand Funk Railroad
- Amy Grant
- Earl Grant
- The Grass Roots
- Dobie Gray
- Buddy Greco
- Al Green
- Keith Green
- Jack Greene
- Robert Greenidge
- Lee Greenwood
- Patty Griffin
- Nanci Griffith
- Dave Grusin
- Guns N' Roses
- Buddy Guy
- Buddy Hackett
- Charlie Haden
- Merle Haggard
- Bill Haley & His Comets
- Aaron Hall
- Lani Hall
- Chico Hamilton
- George Hamilton IV
- Vicky Hamilton
- Hamilton, Joe Frank & Reynolds
- Marvin Hamlisch
- Jan Hammer
- Lionel Hampton
- John Handy
- Slim Harpo
- Richard Harris
- Freddie Hart
- Dan Hartman
- Johnny Hartman
- Coleman Hawkins
- Dale Hawkins
- Richie Havens
- Roy Haynes
- Head East
- Heavy D
- Bobby Helms
- Don Henley
- Clarence "Frogman" Henry
- Woody Herman
- Milt Herth
- John Hiatt
- Al Hibbler
- Dan Hicks
- Monk Higgins
- Jessie Hill
- Earl Hines
- Roger Hodgson
- Hole
- Billie Holiday
- Jennifer Holliday
- Buddy Holly
- The Hollywood Flames
- Eddie Holman
- John Lee Hooker
- Stix Hooper
- Bob Hope
- Paul Horn
- Shirley Horn
- Big Walter Horton
- Thelma Houston
- Rebecca Lynn Howard
- Jan Howard
- Howlin' Wolf
- Freddie Hubbard
- Humble Pie
- Engelbert Humperdinck
- Brian Hyland
- The Impressions
- The Ink Spots
- Iron Butterfly
- Burl Ives
- Janet Jackson
- Joe Jackson
- Milt Jackson
- Ahmad Jamal
- Etta James
- Elmore James
- James Gang
- Keith Jarrett
- Jason & The Scorchers
- Jawbreaker
- Garland Jeffreys
- Beverly Jenkins
- Gordon Jenkins
- The Jets
- Jimmy Eat World
- Jodeci
- Johnnie & Joe
- The Joe Perry Project
- Elton John
- J. J. Johnson
- Al Jolson
- Booker T. Jones
- Elvin Jones
- George Jones
- Hank Jones
- Jack Jones
- Marti Jones
- Quincy Jones
- Rickie Lee Jones
- Tamiko Jones
- Tom Jones
- Louis Jordan
- The Jordanaires
- Jurassic 5
- Bert Kaempfert
- Kitty Kallen
- Kalin Twins
- Bob Kames
- Kansas
- Boris Karloff
- Sammy Kaye
- K-Ci & JoJo
- Toby Keith
- Gene Kelly
- Chaka Khan
- Andy Kim
- B.B. King
- Martin Luther King Jr.
- Wayne King
- The Kingsmen
- The Kingston Trio
- Roland Kirk
- Eartha Kitt
- John Klemmer
- Klymaxx
- Baker Knight
- Chris Knight
- Gladys Knight & the Pips
- Krokus
- Steve Kuhn
- Joachim Kühn
- Rolf Kühn
- Patti LaBelle
- L.A. Dream Team
- Frankie Laine
- Lambert, Hendricks & Ross
- Denise LaSalle
- Yusef Lateef
- Steve Lawrence
- Lafayette Leake
- Brenda Lee
- Laura Lee
- Leapy Lee
- Peggy Lee
- Danni Leigh
- The Lennon Sisters
- J.B. Lenoir
- Jerry Lee Lewis
- Jerry Lewis
- Meade Lux Lewis
- Ramsey Lewis
- Liberace
- Lifehouse
- Enoch Light
- The Lightning Seeds
- Limp Bizkit
- Lisa Loeb
- Little Milton
- Little River Band
- Little Walter
- Lobo
- Nils Lofgren
- Lone Justice
- Guy Lombardo
- Lord Tracy
- The Louvin Brothers
- Love
- Patty Loveless
- The Lovelites
- Lyle Lovett
- Love Unlimited
- Loretta Lynn
- L.T.D.
- Lynyrd Skynyrd
- Gloria Lynne
- Moms Mabley
- Willie Mabon
- Warner Mack
- Dave Mackay
- Miriam Makeba
- The Mamas and the Papas
- Melissa Manchester
- Barbara Mandrell
- Chuck Mangione
- Shelly Manne
- Wade Marcus
- Mark-Almond
- Pigmeat Markham
- Steve Marriott
- Wink Martindale
- Groucho Marx
- Hugh Masekela
- Dave Mason
- Jerry Mason
- Matthews Southern Comfort
- The Mavericks
- Robert Maxwell
- John Mayall
- Percy Mayfield
- Lyle Mays
- Les McCann
- Delbert McClinton
- Robert Lee McCollum
- Marilyn McCoo
- Van McCoy
- Jimmy McCracklin
- Jack McDuff
- Reba McEntire
- Gary McFarland
- Barry McGuire
- The McGuire Sisters
- Duff McKagan
- Maria McKee
- McKendree Spring
- Marian McPartland
- Clyde McPhatter
- Carmen McRae
- Jack McVea
- Meat Loaf
- John Mellencamp
- Memphis Slim
- Sergio Mendes
- Ethel Merman
- Pat Metheny
- Mighty Clouds of Joy
- Roger Miller
- Stephanie Mills
- The Mills Brothers
- Liza Minnelli
- Charles Mingus
- Joni Mitchell
- Bill Monroe
- Vaughn Monroe
- Buddy Montgomery
- Wes Montgomery
- The Moody Blues
- The Moonglows
- Jane Morgan
- Russ Morgan
- Ennio Morricone
- Mos Def
- Martin Mull
- Gerry Mulligan
- Milton Nascimento
- Johnny Nash
- Nazareth
- Nelson
- Jimmy Nelson
- Oliver Nelson
- Ricky Nelson
- Aaron Neville
- Art Neville
- The Neville Brothers
- New Edition
- New Riders of the Purple Sage
- Olivia Newton-John
- Night Ranger
- Leonard Nimoy
- Nine Inch Nails
- Nirvana
- Nitty Gritty Dirt Band
- No Doubt
- Ken Nordine
- Red Norvo
- Terri Nunn
- The Oak Ridge Boys
- Ric Ocasek
- Phil Ochs
- Hazel O'Connor
- Chico O'Farrill
- Oingo Boingo
- The O'Jays
- Spooner Oldham
- One Flew South
- Yoko Ono
- Orleans
- Jeffrey Osborne
- The Outfield
- Pablo Cruise
- Jackie Paris
- Leo Parker
- Junior Parker
- Ray Parker Jr.
- Dolly Parton
- Les Paul
- Freda Payne
- Peaches & Herb
- Pebbles
- CeCe Peniston
- The Peppermint Rainbow
- The Persuasions
- Bernadette Peters
- Tom Petty and the Heartbreakers
- John Phillips
- Webb Pierce
- Poco
- The Pointer Sisters
- The Police
- Doc Pomus
- Jimmy Ponder
- Iggy Pop
- Billy Preston
- Lloyd Price
- Louis Prima
- Primus
- Red Prysock
- Puddle of Mudd
- Leroy Pullins
- The Pussycat Dolls
- Quarterflash
- Queen Latifah
- Sun Ra
- The Radiants
- Gerry Rafferty
- Kenny Rankin
- The Ray Charles Singers
- The Ray-O-Vacs
- The Rays
- Dewey Redman
- Della Reese
- Martha Reeves
- R.E.M.
- Debbie Reynolds
- Emitt Rhodes
- Busta Rhymes
- Buddy Rich
- Emil Richards
- Dannie Richmond
- Riders in the Sky
- Stan Ridgway
- Sam Rivers
- Max Roach
- Howard Roberts
- Marty Roberts
- The Roches
- Chris Rock
- Tommy Roe
- Jimmy Rogers
- Sonny Rollins
- The Roots
- Rose Royce
- Doctor Ross
- Jackie Ross
- Rotary Connection
- Roswell Rudd
- Rufus
- Otis Rush
- Brenda Russell
- Leon Russell
- Pee Wee Russell
- The Russian Jazz Quartet
- Mitch Ryder
- Buffy Sainte-Marie
- Joe Sample
- Pharoah Sanders
- The Sandpipers
- Shirley Scott
- Tom Scott
- Dawn Sears
- Neil Sedaka
- Jeannie Seely
- Semisonic
- Charlie Sexton
- Tupac Shakur
- Georgie Shaw
- Marlena Shaw
- Archie Shepp
- Dinah Shore
- Ben Sidran
- Silver Apples
- Shel Silverstein
- The Simon Sisters
- Ashlee Simpson
- The Simpsons
- Zoot Sims
- P.F. Sloan
- Smash Mouth
- Kate Smith
- Keely Smith
- Tab Smith
- Patty Smyth
- Snoop Dogg
- Valaida Snow
- Jill Sobule
- Soft Machine
- Sonic Youth
- Sonny & Cher
- The Soul Stirrers
- Soundgarden
- Eddie South
- Southern Culture on the Skids
- The Sparkletones
- Spinal Tap
- The Spokesmen
- Squeeze
- Jo Stafford
- Chris Stamey
- Joe Stampley
- Michael Stanley
- Kay Starr
- Stealers Wheel
- Steely Dan
- Gwen Stefani
- Steppenwolf
- Cat Stevens
- Billy Stewart
- Sting
- Sonny Stitt
- Shane Stockton
- George Strait
- Strawberry Alarm Clock
- Strawbs
- Steve and Eydie
- Styx
- Sublime
- Sum 41
- Yma Sumac
- Andy Summers
- The Sundowners
- Supertramp
- The Surfaris
- Sylvia Syms
- Gábor Szabó
- The Tams
- Grady Tate
- t.A.T.u.
- Billy Taylor
- Koko Taylor
- Charlie Teagarden
- Temple of the Dog
- Clark Terry
- Tesla
- Sister Rosetta Tharpe
- Robin Thicke
- Toots Thielemans
- B.J. Thomas
- Irma Thomas
- Rufus Thomas
- Hank Thompson
- Lucky Thompson
- Big Mama Thornton
- Three Dog Night
- The Three Stooges
- Tiffany
- Mel Tillis
- Tommy & the Tom Toms
- Mel Tormé
- The Tragically Hip
- The Trapp Family Singers
- Ralph Tresvant
- Ernest Tubb
- The Tubes
- Tanya Tucker
- Tommy Tucker
- The Tune Weavers
- Ike Turner
- Stanley Turrentine
- Conway Twitty
- McCoy Tyner
- Phil Upchurch
- Michael Utley
- Leroy Van Dyke
- Gino Vannelli
- Van Zant
- Billy Vaughan
- Suzanne Vega
- Veruca Salt
- The Vibrations
- Bobby Vinton
- Voivod
- Porter Wagoner
- The Waikikis
- Rufus Wainwright
- Rick Wakeman
- Jerry Jeff Walker
- The Wallflowers
- Joe Walsh
- Wang Chung
- Clara Ward
- Warrior Soul
- War
- Washboard Sam
- Was (Not Was)
- Baby Washington
- The Watchmen
- Muddy Waters
- Jody Watley
- Johnny "Guitar" Watson
- The Weavers
- Ben Webster
- Weezer
- We Five
- George Wein
- Lenny Welch
- Lawrence Welk
- Kitty Wells
- Mae West
- Barry White
- Michael White
- Slappy White
- Whitesnake
- White Zombie
- The Who
- Whycliffe
- Kim Wilde
- Don Williams
- Jody Williams
- John Williams
- Larry Williams
- Lenny Williams
- Leona Williams
- Paul Williams
- Roger Williams
- Sonny Boy Williamson
- Walter Winchell
- Kai Winding
- Johnny Winter
- Wishbone Ash
- Jimmy Witherspoon
- Bobby Womack
- Lee Ann Womack
- Phil Woods
- Wrecks-N-Effect
- O. V. Wright
- Bill Wyman
- Rusty York
- Faron Young
- Neil Young
- Young Black Teenagers
- Y&T
- Rob Zombie

Subsequent legal documents filed by Universal Music Group in February 2020 cited four additional artists not included in the New York Times list:

- And You Will Know Us by the Trail of Dead
- David Baerwald
- Michael McDonald
- Slayer

== See also ==
- 1914 Lubin vault fire
- 1937 Fox vault fire, destroyed many of the studio's pre-1932 silent films
- 1965 MGM vault fire, destroyed many of the studio's silent and early sound films
- 2008 in music
- 2008 in the United States
- List of building or structure fires
- Myspace, another company involved in a loss of music that also went unreported by the media until 2019
