= Stephanie Haynes =

American jazz singer

Stephanie Haynes (d. 2015) was an American jazz singer, renowned for her beautiful voice and her extensive jazz, pop and American songbook repertoire of over 400 tunes. She has been called one of the world's most underrated jazz singers.

== Professional life ==
Haynes studied at the University of California, Santa Barbara, where she was trained in flute playing as she had thoughts of becoming a classical flautist. Once she started to meet jazz musicians however, she became interested in the genre. When asked if she could sing, she started to do so with a repertoire of only two songs.

By the late 1960s, Haynes was performing in jazz clubs in Albuquerque, New Mexico. After a short period singing with a pop group, she moved to Orange County, California to sing jazz again, often with the pianist Kent Glenn. From the early 1980s onwards, Haynes appeared regularly in Los Angeles and Orange County clubs with the Cedar Walton Trio. and elsewhere with Daniel May. In the 1990s, she had a busy touring schedule and started working with the pianist Dave Mackay. Mackay also worked with saxophonist Sonny Stitt, trumpeters Chet Baker and Don Ellis and vocalists Vicki Hamilton and Bill Henderson.

Mackay said of Haynes, "She has a beautiful, full voice and can also get down and be very funky. She's a very creative singer who brings new things to old tunes every time she does them. She takes the music to a different place."

In 1993, Haynes established her own recording label called Why Not Records and recorded an album with Dave Mackay at Daniel May's studio. In the 1990s, Haynes also sang with bassist-composer Jack Prather's quintet called Bopsicle. Bopsicle recorded an album with Why Not Records.

In 2012, after a break, Haynes was back singing in jazz clubs such as Vitello's and towards the end of her life in 2013 sang at Newport Beach.

Haynes is listed as one of the many jazz notables with whom the Orange Coast College Jazz Ensembles have performed. Others that the college is proud to mention include Oscar Brashear, Pete Christlieb, Don Ellis, Dewey Erney, and Bruce Eskovitz.

Haynes died in 2015. A memorial concert was held in her honor on November 1, 2015, at the Catalina Club. Many famous figures in the jazz scene attended and performed including Billy Childs, Steve Huffsteter, Paul Kreibich, Billy Mitchell (saxophonist), Barbara Morrison, Cathy Segal-Garcia and Tiernney Sutton.

== Personal life ==
Haynes was born in Glendale, California. She married and had a son around 1969. She later divorced and remarried to percussionist Steve Gutierrez.

== Discography ==
- The Only Music by Stephanie Haynes, released in 1985 on Turnkey Media Solutions.
- Here's That Rainy Day 1988 Trend/Discovery with pianist Cedar Walton, bassist Al McKibbon and drummer Billy Higgins. The album is a collection of Jimmy Van Heusen tunes.
- Dawn at Dana Point 1992 Holt.
- Two on a Swing 1993.
