= Francisco Aguabella =

Jazz and folk percussionist (1925–2010)

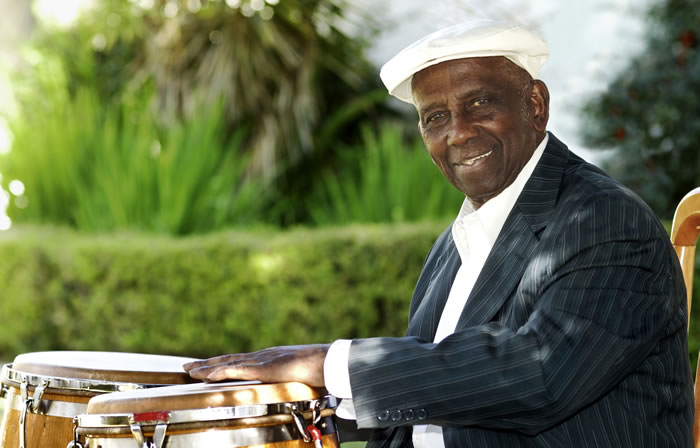
- Aguabella in 1992

Background information
- Born: October 10, 1925; Matanzas, Cuba
- Died: May 7, 2010 (aged 84) Los Angeles, California, U.S.
- Genres: Cuban rumba, Afro-Cuban jazz
- Occupation: Musician
- Instruments: Percussion, Batá drum, congas
- Years active: 1940s–2000s
- Website: franciscoaguabella.com

Francisco Aguabella (October 10, 1925 – May 7, 2010) was an Afro-Cuban percussionist whose career spanned folk, jazz, and dance bands. He was a prolific session musician and recorded seven albums as a leader.

== Biography ==
=== In Cuba ===
Aguabella was born in Matanzas, Cuba. He demonstrated a special aptitude for drumming at an early age, and was initiated into several Afro-Cuban drumming traditions, including batá, iyesá, arará, olokún, and abakuá. Aguabella also grew up with rumba.

The first thing you hear when you wake up in the morning is the drums. It’s a national sport, as important as baseball. You see a bunch of guys on the street, and someone will start clapping his hands, or tapping out a rhythm on a Coke bottle with the bottle cap. Then they’ll be pounding on wooden crates, or a wall, or splashing in the puddles of water dripping out of an old air conditioner, or playfully tapping on somebody’s head. You can’t escape the rumba

— Aguabella (1999).

=== In the United States ===
In the 1950s, he left Cuba to perform with Katherine Dunham in the Shelley Winters film Mambo filmed in Italy. He immigrated to the United States in 1953 and performed and toured with Peggy Lee for the next seven years. Francisco Aguabella is one of a handful of Cuban percussionists who came to the United States in the 1940s and 50s. Other notable Cuban percussionists who came to the U.S. during that time include Chano Pozo, Mongo Santamaria, Armando Peraza, Julito Collazo, Carlos Vidal Bolado and Modesto Durán. During his long career Aguabella performed in Europe, Australia, South America, and all over the United States (including the White House). Francisco enjoyed an extensive music performing and recording career and delighted many audiences with his masterful and powerful rhythms.

Francisco performed with many great jazz artists such as Dizzy Gillespie, Tito Puente, Mongo Santamaria, Frank Sinatra, Peggy Lee, Eddie Palmieri, Cachao, Lalo Schifrin, Cal Tjader, Nancy Wilson, Poncho Sanchez, Bebo Valdes, Carlos Santana, Donald Vega, and numerous others. He is featured in the 1995 documentary Sworn to the Drum by filmmaker Les Blank, and is featured in a documentary titled Aguabella currently in production, directed by actor/filmmaker Orestes Matacena (The Mask, Bitter Sugar). He has also appeared with his ensemble on television programs including the Orlando Jones Show on FX.

During the 1970s he was a member of the Jorge Santana Latin rock band Malo. Francisco was a widely recognized master conguero and bata artist, a caring and knowledgeable instructor. Aguabella was a faculty member at the annual Explorations in Afro-Cuban Dance and Drum workshop hosted by the Humboldt State University Office of Extended Education in Arcata, California. He lived in Los Angeles, California, where he taught Afro-Cuban drumming to undergraduate and graduate students at the University of California, Los Angeles.

Aguabella died in Los Angeles on May 7, 2010, of a cancer-related illness.

== Instruments ==
Aguabella played congas, bata, quinto, coro, shekere, drums, claves, bongos, timbales, cajon and other assorted percussion instruments.

== Awards and honors ==
Francisco received numerous awards including a 1992 National Heritage Fellowship from the National Endowment for the Arts, the Durfee Foundation's Master Musicians' Fellowship, and recognition by the Los Angeles County Arts Commission.

== Discography ==
=== As leader ===
- Dance the Latin Way (Fantasy, 1962)
- Hitting Hard (Epsilon 1977)
- Oriza: Santeria Religion Afrocubana (Ubiquity Records, 1993)
- H2O (Cubop, 1999)
- Agua de Cuba (Cubop, 1999)
- Cubacan (Cubop, 2002)
- Cantos a los Orishas (Pimienta, 2002)
- Ochimini (Cubop, 2004)

=== As sideman ===
With Cachao

- Master Sessions Volume I (Epic, 1994)
- Master Sessions Volume II (Epic, 1995)

With Peggy Lee

- Mink Jazz (Capitol, 1963)
- In Love Again! (Capitol, 1964)
- In the Name of Love (Capitol, 1964)
- Pass Me By (Capitol, 1965)
- Guitars a là Lee (Capitol, 1966)
- Big $pender (Capitol, 1966)

With Malo

- Dos (Warner Bros., 1972)
- Evolution (Warner Bros., 1973)
- Ascención (Warner Bros., 1974)

With Eddie Palmieri

- Justicia (Tico, 1969)
- Lucumí, Macumba, Voodoo (Epic, 1978)
- Sueño (Intuition, 1989)
- Champagne (Tico, 1990)

With Tito Puente

- Top Percussion (RCA, 1958)
- El Rey (Concord Jazz Picante, 1984)

With Mongo Santamaria

- Yambu (Fantasy, 1958)
- Afro Roots (Prestige, 1972)

With Carlos Santana

- The Swing of Delight (Columbia, 1980)

With Santana

- Spirits Dancing in the Flesh (Columbia, 1990)

With Lalo Schifrin

- Gone with the Wave (Colpix, 1965)
- More Mission: Impossible (ABC, 1968)
- Mannix (ABC, 1968)
- Che! (Tetragrammaton, 1969)
- Enter the Dragon (Warner Bros., 1973)
- Metamorphosis: Jazz Meets the Symphony No. 4 (Aleph, 1998)

With others

- Louie Bellson, Walfredo de los Reyes, Ecue (Pablo, 1978)
- Elmer Bernstein, Movie and TV Themes (Choreo, 1987)
- Harry Betts, The Jazz Soul of Doctor Kildare (Choreo, 1962)
- The Doors, Other Voices (Elektra, 1971)
- Pete Escovedo, Flying South (Concord Picante, 1995)
- Gil Fuller, Night Flight (Pacific Jazz, 1966)
- Dizzy Gillespie, The New Continent (Limelight, 1965)
- Neal Hefti, Jazz Pops (Reprise, 2007)
- Joe Henderson, Canyon Lady (Milestone, 1975)
- Bobby Hutcherson, Ambos Mundos (Landmark, 1989)
- Imagination, Closer (RCA, 1987)
- Barney Kessel, Contemporary Latin Rhythms (Reprise, 1963)
- Hugh Masekela, Reconstruction (Chisa, 1970)
- Dave Mackay, Vicky Hamilton, Dave Mackay & Vicky Hamilton (Impulse!, 1969)
- Letta Mbulu, Letta (Chisa, 1970)
- Pages, Pages (Epic, 1978)
- Emil Richards, Yazz Per Favore (Del-fi, 1961)
- Poncho Sanchez, Out of Sight! (Concord, 2003)
- Paul Simon, The Rhythm of the Saints (Warner Bros., 1990)
- Ernie Watts, The Wonder Bag (Vault, 1970)

== Filmography ==
- 1954 — Mambo
- 1995 — Sworn to the Drum: A Tribute to Francisco Aguabella (directed by Les Blank)
