= Dos (Malo album) =

Studio album by Malo
- Released: August 1972
- Recorded: 1972
- Genre: Latin rock
- Length: 36:23
- Label: Warner Bros.
- Producer: David Rubinson

Malo chronology
Malo (1972)	Dos (1972)	Evolution (1973)

Professional ratings
Review scores
Source	Rating
Allmusic	4/5 stars

Dos is the second album by Latin rock band Malo, released in 1972.

== Track listing ==
1. "Momotombo" (Pablo Tellez/Abel Zarate) - 5:06
2. "Oye Mamá" (Arcelio Garcia, Jr./Leo Rosales) - 6:03
3. "I'm For Real" (Arcelio Garcia, Jr./Jorge Santana) - 6:39
4. "Midnight Thoughts" ( Pablo Tellez) - 3:58
5. "Helá" (Arcelio Garcia, Jr./Francisco Aquabella) - 5:06
6. "Latin Bugaloo" (Abel Zarate/Arcelio Garcia, Jr.) - 9:31

== Personnel ==
- Arcelio García, Jr. — lead and backing vocals, percussion
- John Watson — backing vocals
- Forrest Buchtel — trumpet
- Hadley Caliman — tenor saxophone, baritone saxophone, flute
- Jorge Santana — guitars
- Richard Kermode – piano, electric piano, organ, percussion
- Pablo Tellez — bass, guitar
- Francisco Aquabella — congas, backing vocals, bongos, percussion
- Leo Rosales — timbales, backing vocals, congas, bongos, drums, percussion
- José Santana — violin on "I'm For Real"
- Alex Rodrigues — trumpet on "I'm For Real"
- George Bermudez – congas on "I'm For Real" and "Helá", percussion on "Midnight Thoughts"
- Rick Quintanal — drums on "Midnight Thoughts"
- Bobby Ramirez — drums on "I'm For Real"
- Mike Heathman – trombone on "Latin Bugaloo"
- Bill Alwood — trumpet on "Latin Bugaloo"
- Tom Poole — trumpet on "Latin Bugaloo"
- Raul Rekow – congas on "Latin Bugaloo"
- Richard Spremich – drums on "Latin Bugaloo"

== Credits ==
- Production, engineering and mixing: David Rubinson.
- Recording director: Fred Calero.
- Mastering: George Home.
- Art direction: Chris Whorf.
- Photography: Herb Greene.
- Album design: John & Barbara Casado.

== Charts ==
Album - Billboard (US)

Year	Chart	Position
1972	The Billboard 200	62
1972	R&B Albums	13
