= Bill Henderson (performer) =

American actor and singer (1926–2016)

- Bill Henderson in 1981
- Born: William Randall Henderson; March 19, 1926; Chicago, Illinois, U.S.
- Died: April 3, 2016 (aged 90); Los Angeles, California, U.S.
- Occupations: Actor; singer
- Years active: 1952–2016

William Randall Henderson (March 19, 1926 – April 3, 2016) was an American television and film actor, and jazz singer.

== Biography ==
Henderson was born in Chicago, Illinois, United States. Henderson began his professional music career in 1952, performing in Chicago with Ramsey Lewis, and began recording as a leader after a move to New York in 1958. He subsequently recorded with jazz pianist Horace Silver on a vocal version of Silver's "Señor Blues" which was a jukebox hit (in the mid-1950s), and remains one of jazz label Blue Note's top-selling singles. Additionally, Henderson performed and recorded with Oscar Peterson (Bill Henderson with the Oscar Peterson Trio), Jimmy Smith, Count Basie, Yusef Lateef, and Eddie Harris. He was under contract to the Vee Jay label between 1958 and 1961, who recorded his first album as leader, Bill Henderson Sings (1958), which features trumpeter Booker Little among the sidemen.

Beginning in the mid-1970s, he frequently appeared on television in supporting, usually one-time roles. His film roles have followed a similar trend — minor and supporting roles. Henderson also recorded his own vocal tracks as "King Blues" for the comedy film Get Crazy (1983). Henderson made a guest vocal appearance on Charlie Haden's album The Art of the Song (1999). Henderson also appeared in the films Inside Moves (1980), City Slickers (1991) and White Men Can't Jump (1992), among others.

== Discography ==
Albums

- Bill Henderson Sings (with Ramsey Lewis Trio, Wynton Kelly Sextet; arranged by Benny Golson, Frank Wess) (Vee-Jay 1015, 1959)
- Bill Henderson [self-titled] (with Eddie Higgins Quartet, Tommy Flanagan Quartet, Thad Jones Big Band, Jimmy Jones Strings) (Vee-Jay 1031, 1961)
- Please Send Me Someone To Love (with Eddie Harris, Eddie Higgins, Joe Diorio, Rail Wilson, Al Duncan) (Vee-Jay International 3055, 1960-1961 [rel. 1974]; reissued as Collectables 7144, 2000)
- Bill Henderson with the Oscar Peterson Trio (with Oscar Peterson, Ray Brown, Ed Thigpen) (MGM 4128, 1963; reissued as Verve/Polygram 837937, 1989)
- When My Dreamboat Comes Home (with Jimmy Jones Orchestra; arranged by Rene Hall, Jimmy Jones, Bobby Scott) (Verve 8619, 1965)
- Live In Concert With The Count Basie Band (Monad 802, 1966 [rel. 1995])
- Live At The Times (with Joyce Collins, Dave Mackay, Tom Azarello, Jimmie Smith) (Discovery 779, 1975 [rel. 1977])
- Bill Henderson Live: Joey Revisited (with Joyce Collins, Dave Mackay, Steve LaSpina, Jerry Coleman) (Monad 807, 1976 [rel. 1995])
- Street Of Dreams (with Joyce Collins, Dave Mackay, Jim Hughart, Jimmie Smith, Pete Christlieb) (Discovery 802, 1979)
- A Tribute To Johnny Mercer (with Joyce Collins, Dave Mackay, Joey Baron) (Discovery 846, 1981)
- Nancy Wilson, Presents Great Jazz Night: Red Hot & Cool II (featuring Bill Henderson) (LaserDisc, 1990)
- White Men Can't Jump [original soundtrack] (Bill as member of the Venice Beach Boys) (Capitol/EMI 98414, 1992)
- Charlie Haden Quartet West, The Art of the Song (featuring Shirley Horn, Bill Henderson) (Verve/Polygram 547403, 1999)
- Mike Melvoin With Charlie Haden Featuring Bill Henderson, The Capitol Sessions (Naim Audio Ltd, 2000)
- Chico Hamilton, Juniflip (featuring Bill Henderson) (Joyous Shout, 2006)
- Live At The Kennedy Center (with Ed Vodicka Trio) (Web Only Jazz, 2006)
- Beautiful Memory: Bill Henderson Live At The Vic (with Tateng Katindig, Chris Conner, Roy McCurdy) (Ahuh Productions, 2008)

Compilations

- Something's Gotta Give (Discovery 932, 1986) – compilation of Discovery 802 [seven songs], and Discovery 846 [seven songs]
- Sings (Best Of) (Suite Beat 2016, 1986) – compilation of Vee-Jay 1015 [six songs], Vee-Jay 1031 [four songs], and Vee-Jay International 3055 [four songs]
- His Complete Vee-Jay Recordings, Volume One (Vee-Jay LLP NVJ2-909, 1993; reissued as Koch Jazz 8548, 2000)
- His Complete Vee-Jay Recordings, Volume Two (Vee-Jay LLP NVJ2-912, 1993; reissued as Koch Jazz 8572, 2000)

Singles

- Bill Henderson Sings...with the Horace Silver Quintet, "Señor Blues"/"Tippin'" (Blue Note, 1958) – note: both released on CD reissue of 6 Pieces of Silver
- Bill Henderson Sings...with the Jimmy Smith Trio, "Ain't No Use"/"Angel Eyes" (Blue Note, 1958) – note: both released on CD reissue of Softly as a Summer Breeze
- Bill Henderson Sings...with the Jimmy Smith Trio, "Ain't That Love"/"Willow Weep for Me" (Blue Note, 1958) – note: both released on CD reissue of Softly as a Summer Breeze
- "How Long Has This Been Going On?"/"Busy Signal" (Riverside, 1958)
- "Bye Bye Blackbird"/"Bad Luck" (Vee Jay, 1959)
- "Joey" [AKA "Joey, Joey, Joey"]/"Sweet Pumpkin" (Vee Jay, 1960)
- "Sleepy"/"It Never Entered My Mind" (Vee Jay, 1960)
- "My How The Time Goes By"/"Sweet Georgia Brown" (Vee Jay, 1961)
- "When My Dream Boat Comes Home"/"Who Can I Turn To (When Nobody Needs Me)" (Verve, 1965)
- "Lay Down Your Weary Tune"/"If I Could Be With You (One Hour Tonight)" (Verve, 1965)
- "Bend Over Backwards"/"What Are You Doing the Rest of Your Life?" (Warner Bros., 1970)
- "Send in the Clowns"/"Send in the Clowns" (12-inch single [side A: 33 1/3rpm, side B: 45 rpm], Discovery/Classic/Jazz Planet, 1996) – from Live At The Times

== Filmography ==
=== Film ===
- Trouble Man (1972) – Jimmy, Pool Room Owner
- Cornbread, Earl and Me (1975) – Mr Watkins
- Silver Streak (1976) – Red Cap
- Mother, Jugs & Speed (1976) – Charles Taylor
- Inside Moves (1980) – Blue Lewis
- Continental Divide (1981) – Train Conductor
- Get Crazy (1983) – King Blues
- The Adventures of Buckaroo Banzai Across the 8th Dimension (1984) – Casper Lindley
- Clue (1985) – The Cop
- Fletch (1985) – Speaker
- Wisdom (1986) – Theo
- Murphy's Law (1986) – Ben Wilcove
- How I Got into College (1989) – Detroit High School Coach
- No Holds Barred (1989) – Charlie
- Cousins (1989) – Valhalla Band
- City Slickers (1991) – Dr. Ben Jessup
- White Men Can't Jump (1992) – Member of the Venice Beach Boys
- Maverick (1994) – Mr. Hightower, Riverboat Poker Player
- "Weird Al" Yankovic: There's No Going Home (1996) – Blind Lemon Yankovic (uncredited)
- Ghosts of Mississippi (1996) – Minister
- Hoodlum (1997) – Mr. Redmond
- Conspiracy Theory (1997) – Hospital Security
- Lethal Weapon 4 (1998) – Angry Patient
- Trippin' (1999) – Gramps Reed
- Hard Ground (2003) – Junior Gunn
- The Alibi (2006) – Counterman

=== Television ===
- Happy Days (1974) – Mr. Davis
- Harry O (1974-1976) – Spencer Johnson / Teak
- Sanford and Son (1975) – Harvey
- Good Times (1976-1977) – Ray the Bartender / Night Club Owner
- The Jeffersons (1977) – JoJo
- What's Happening!! (1977) – Clarence Hopkins
- Diff'rent Strokes (1979) – Attendant
- The Incredible Hulk (1979) – Antoine Moray / Babalao
- Ad Lib (1981)
- Benson (1982) – Jay
- Hill Street Blues (1983) – Maynard
- Ace Crawford, Private Eye (1983) as Mello, a blind jazz musician at The Shanty. The series starred Tim Conway.
- The Facts of Life (1985) – Art "Jazzbeau" Jackson
- MacGyver (1987) – Gas Station Cashier
- In the Heat of the Night (1993) – Bishop William Prinn
- NYPD Blue (1996) – Verdis
- Mad About You (1998) – Mets Shortstop
- Beyond Belief: Fact or Fiction (1998) – Lloyd Weeks
- ER (1999) – Charley Barnes
- Malcolm & Eddie (1999) – Uncle Buddy (voice)
- 7th Heaven (2000) – Caleb
- Cold Case (2003) – George 'Tinkerbell' Polk (2003)
- My Name Is Earl (2007) – Charlie (final appearance)
