= Evolution (Malo album) =

Studio album by Malo
- Released: 1973
- Recorded: 1973
- Genre: Latin rock
- Length: 39:22
- Label: Warner Bros.
- Producer: David Rubinson

Malo chronology
Dos (1972)	Evolution (1973)	Ascención (1974)

Professional ratings
Review scores
Source	Rating
Allmusic	3/5 stars

Evolution is the third album by Latin Rock band Malo, released in 1973. The album has been reissued on CD in 2001 as one of the discs in Rhino Handmade's Celebración box set, with the addition of single edits of I Don't Know and Merengue.

== Track listing ==
1. "Moving Away" (Ron Smith/James Cicero) - 7:17
2. "I Don't Know" (Sonny Henry) - 6:04
3. "Merengue" (Francisco Aquabella/Arcelio Garcia, Jr.) - 7:03
4. "All For You" (Ron DeMasi/Jorge Santana/Pablo Tellez) - 4:04
5. "Dance to My Mambo" (Forrest Buchtel /Arcelio Garcia, Jr.) - 4:40
6. "Entrance to Paradise" (Pablo Tellez /Ismael Versoza) - 5:09
7. "Street Man" (Pablo Tellez /Arcelio Garcia, Jr./Ron DeMasi) - 5:05

== Personnel ==
Malo

- Arcelio Garcia — vocals, percussion; co-lead vocals on "I Don't Know", "All For You" and "Dance To My Mambo", lead vocals on "Merengue" and "Street Man"
- Forrest Buchtel — trumpet
- Ron Smith — trumpet
- Steve Sherard — trombone, vocals
- Jorge Santana — guitar
- Ron DeMasi — electric piano, organ, clavinet, vocals
- Pablo Tellez — bass, vocals; co-lead vocals on "Dance To My Mambo"
- Francisco Aquabella — bongos, congas, timbales, percussion, vocals
- Tony Smith — drums, vocals; lead vocals on "Moving Away", co-lead vocals on "I Don't Know" and "All For You"

Additional Personnel

- Carlos Federico — piano (on track 3)
- Al Zulaica — piano (on track 5)

== Credits ==
- Recorded at Wally Heider Studio, San Francisco, and Funky Features, San Francisco.

== Charts ==
Chart (1973)	Peak position
Billboard Top LPs	101
Billboard Top Soul LPs	39
