= Malo (album) =

Studio album by Malo
- Released: January 1972
- Recorded: Fall 1971
- Genres: Latin rock, funk
- Length: 44:31
- Label: Warner Bros.
- Producer: David Rubinson

Malo chronology
Malo (1972)	Dos (1972)

Professional ratings
Review scores
Source	Rating
Allmusic	4.5/5 stars

Malo is the first album by 12-piece San Francisco band Malo, released in 1972. It contains the #18 single, "Suavecito". The album charted #14 at the Billboard Top LPs chart. The album's cover art is sourced from a painting by Mexican painter Jesús Helguera.

== Track listing ==
1. "Pana" (Arcelio García, Jr./Abel Zarate) - 6:45
2. "Just Say Goodbye" (Rodgers Grant/Luis Gasca) - 8:00
3. "Café" (Arcelio García/ Jorge Santana, Jr./Pablo Tellez) - 7:21
4. "Nena" (Arcelio García, Jr./Pablo Tellez/Abel Zarate) - 6:28
5. "Suavecito" (Richard Bean/Pablo Tellez/Abel Zarate) - 6:36
6. "Peace" (Arcelio Garcia, Jr./Pablo Tellez/Ismael Versoza/Abel Zarate) - 9:21

== Personnel ==
- Arcelio García, Jr. — Lead vocals, percussion
- Jorge Santana — guitar
- Abel Zarate — guitars, vocals
- Pablo Tellez — bass guitar, percussion
- Richard Kermode — keyboards, electric piano, Hammond organ, piano
- Richard Spremich — drums, percussion
- Coke Escovedo — timbales, percussion
- Victor Pantoja — congas, bongos, percussion
- Luis Gasca — trumpet, flugelhorn, vocals
- Roy Murray — flute, trombone, trumpet, soprano sax
- Richard Bean — vocals, percussion, timbales

== Credits ==
- Production, engineering and mixing: David Rubinson.
- Recorded at Pacific Recording Studios, San Mateo, California during Fall 1971.
- Assistant engineers: Fred Catero and Jeremy Zatkin.
- Art direction: Chris Whorf.
- Photography: Victor Alemán.
- Front cover: Jesus Helguera.
- Album design: John & Barbara Casado.

== Charts ==
Album - Billboard (US)

Year	Chart	Position
1972	Billboard Top LPs	14
1972	Billboard Soul Charts	10

Single - Billboard (US)

Single	Year	Chart	Position
Suavecito	1972	U.S. Billboard Hot 100	18
Suavecito	1972	U.S. Cash Box Top 100	12
