= Jorge Santana (album) =

Studio album by Jorge Santana
- Released: June 1978
- Recorded: Early 1968
- Genres: Latin rock, blues rock
- Length: 53:14
- Label: Tomato
- Producers: Bob Clearmountain, Tony Bongiovi & Lance Quinn

Jorge Santana chronology
Jorge Santana (1978)	It's All About Love (1979)

Professional ratings
Review scores
Source	Rating
Allmusic	3/5 stars

Jorge Santana is the first solo album by Mexican guitarist and former Malo member Jorge Santana, released in 1978. The backing up features former Malo members, as vocalist Richard Bean. Jorge Santana is also the brother of guitarist Carlos Santana.

It was reissued in 2003, featuring a new track listing, omitting "Seychells", but featuring two songs remixes.

Jorge Santana charted #54 at Black Albums chart, featuring Richard Bean's "Love The Way" as a single.

== Track listing ==
All songs by Jorge Santana, except where noted.

=== Original LP ===
1. "Love You, Love You" – 5:02
2. "We Were There" – 3:58
3. "Love the Way" (Richard Bean) – 7:18
4. "Sandy" – 4:42
5. "Seychells" – 4:31
6. "Nobody's Perfect"
7. "Tonight You're Mine" – 4:53
8. "Darling I Love You" – 4:22

Album covers stated this to be the running order, but the actual album running order was as on the remastered CD.

=== Remastered CD ===
1. "Sandy" – 4:45
2. "Tonight You're Mine" – 4:45
3. "Darling I Love You" – 4:53
4. "We Were There" – 4:22
5. "Love You, Love You" – 5:02
6. "Love The Way" (Richard Bean) – 7:19
7. "Oh! Tengo Suerte" – 5:32
8. "Nobody's Perfect" – 4:31
9. "Darling I Love You (Dance Mix)" – 6:48
10. "Sandy (Dance Mix)" – 7:06

== Personnel ==
- Jorge Santana: Guitars, vocals.
- Richard Bean: vocals.
- Carlos Roberto: Bass guitar, backing vocals.
- Kincaid Miller: keyboards, electric piano, Hammond organ.
- Jerry Marshall: Drums, Percussion.
- Yogi Newman: Percussion.

== Production ==
- Bob Clearmountain: Producer, engineer.
- Tony Bongiovi: Producer.
- Lance Quinn: Producer.
- Neil Dorfsman: Assistant engineer.
- Raymond Willhard: Assistant engineer.
- Milton Glaser: Cover Design.
- John Kacere: Artwork.

== Charts ==
Album – Billboard (US)

Year	Chart	Position
1978	Black Albums	54

Single – Billboard (US)

Single	Year	Chart	Position
Love The Way	1978	Black Singles	92
