= Love Will Survive =

"Love Will Survive" refers to different recordings:

- Malo single from the 1974 album Ascención
- Donny Osmond single from the 1990 album Eyes Don't Lie
- Krokus song from the 2006 album Hellraiser
- Barbra Streisand song for the 2024 series The Tattooist of Auschwitz
