= Bill Henderson with the Oscar Peterson Trio =

Studio album by Bill Henderson with the Oscar Peterson Trio
- Released: 1963
- Recorded: February 1963
- Genre: Vocal jazz
- Length: 51:42
- Label: Verve
- Producer: Jim Davis

Bill Henderson chronology
Bill Henderson (1961)	Bill Henderson with the Oscar Peterson Trio (1963)	When My Dreamboat Comes Home (1965)

Oscar Peterson chronology
Night Train (1963)	Bill Henderson with the Oscar Peterson Trio (1963)	Oscar Peterson and Nelson Riddle (1963)

Professional ratings
Review scores
Source	Rating
Allmusic	4.5/5 stars

Bill Henderson with the Oscar Peterson Trio is a 1963 album by Bill Henderson, accompanied by Oscar Peterson.

== Track listing ==
1. "You Are My Sunshine" (Jimmie Davis, Charles Mitchell) – 4:35
2. "The Lamp Is Low" (Peter de Rose, Mitchell Parish, Maurice Ravel, Bert Shefter) – 2:48
3. "All or Nothing at All" (Arthur Altman, Jack Lawrence) – 3:39
4. "I Wish You Love" (Léo Chauliac, Charles Trenet, Albert A. Beach) – 3:40
5. "Gravy Waltz" (Steve Allen, Ray Brown) – 2:19
6. "A Lot of Livin' to Do" (Lee Adams, Charles Strouse) – 2:25
7. "I See Your Face Before Me" (Howard Dietz, Arthur Schwartz) – 2:24
8. "I've Got a Crush on You" (George Gershwin, Ira Gershwin) – 4:03
9. "At Long Last Love" (Cole Porter) – 2:28
10. "The Folks Who Live On the Hill" (Oscar Hammerstein II, Jerome Kern) – 3:41
11. "Baby Mine" (traditional) (Note: Blues tune commonly known as "[The] Crawdad Song") – 4:05
12. "Wild Is Love" (Ray Rasch, Dotty Wayne) – 2:36

=== Bonus tracks ===
1. "Where Are You?" (Harold Adamson, Jimmy McHugh) – 3:36
2. "Charmaine" (Lew Pollack, Erno Rapee) – 2:57
3. "Young and Foolish" (Albert Hague, Arnold B. Horwitt) – 3:52
4. "Stranger on the Shore" (Acker Bilk, Robert Mellin) – 2:34

== Personnel ==
=== Performance ===
- Bill Henderson - vocals
- Oscar Peterson – piano
- Ray Brown – double bass
- Ed Thigpen - drums

=== Production ===
- Dom Cerulli - liner notes
- Will Friedwald
- Jim Davis - producer
- Val Valentin - engineer
