= Ascención (album) =

1974 studio album by Malo

Studio album by Malo
- Released: 1974
- Recorded: 1974
- Genre: Latin rock
- Length: 41:13
- Label: Warner Bros.
- Producer: Fred Catero, Jorge Santana, Pablo Tellez

Malo chronology
Evolution (1973)	Ascención (1974)	Malo V (1981)

Professional ratings
Review scores
Source	Rating
Allmusic	2.5/5 stars

Ascención is the fourth album by Latin Rock band Malo, released in 1974.

== Track listing ==
1. "Offerings" (Jorge Santana) - 5:40
2. "A La Escuela" (Francisco Aquabella) - 3:15
3. "Everlasting Night" (Jorge Santana/Bob Lazaneo) - 4:10
4. "Latin Woman" (Ron Smith) - 4:05
5. "Chevere" (Ron DeMasi/Pablo Tellez) - 3:58
6. "Love Will Survive" (Ron DeMasi/Pablo Tellez) - 3:47
7. "Think About Love" (Ron DeMasi) - 3:26
8. "Tiempo de Recordar" (Pablo Tellez) - 3:17
9. "Close to Me" (Ron DeMasi) - 2:40
10. "No Matter" (Jorge Santana) - 6:55

== Personnel ==
- Willy G (William Garcia): lead vocals
- Jorge Santana: guitar, percussion
- Francisco Aquabella: congas, bongos, timbales, lead vocal (on tracks 1 and 2)
- Tony Smith: drums, vocals
- Pablo Tellez: bass, timbales, percussion, vocals
- Ron DeMasi: organ, clavinet, electric piano, Mellotron, synthesizer, vibes, vocals
- Steve Sherard: trombone
- Mike Fugate: trumpet
- Ron Smith: trumpet, Flugel horn

== Credits ==
- Produced by Fred Catero, Jorge Santana and Pablo Tellez
- Recorded at Wally Heider Studio, San Francisco
- Chaos control: Douglas Tracy
- Recording and remix engineer: Fred Catero
- Synthesizer recorded at Different Fur Studio, San Francisco
- Engineer: John Vieira
- Art direction, design and photography: Rudy Rodriguez
- Cover art: Carlos Venegas and Eduardo Jaramillo
- Photography effects: George Rodriguez

== Charts ==
Chart (1974)	Peak position
The Billboard 200	188
