= Esprit Holdings =

Manufacturer of clothing, accessories and housewares

Esprit Holdings Limited
- Logo since 2018
- Type: Public
- Traded as: SEHK: 330
- Industry: Retail, Fashion
- Founded: 1968; 58 years ago in San Francisco, California, U.S.
- Headquarters: Bermuda (Seat); North Point, Hong Kong (HQ); Ratingen, Germany (Co-HQ); New York City, U.S. (Creative HQ)
- Areas served: Worldwide
- Key people: Bradley Wright
- Products: women's clothing, men's clothing, accessories, shoes, body wear, kids wear, glasses, fragrance
- Revenue: 7,064M HK$ (2022)
- Number of employees: approximately 2,230 employees worldwide
- Website: esprit.com

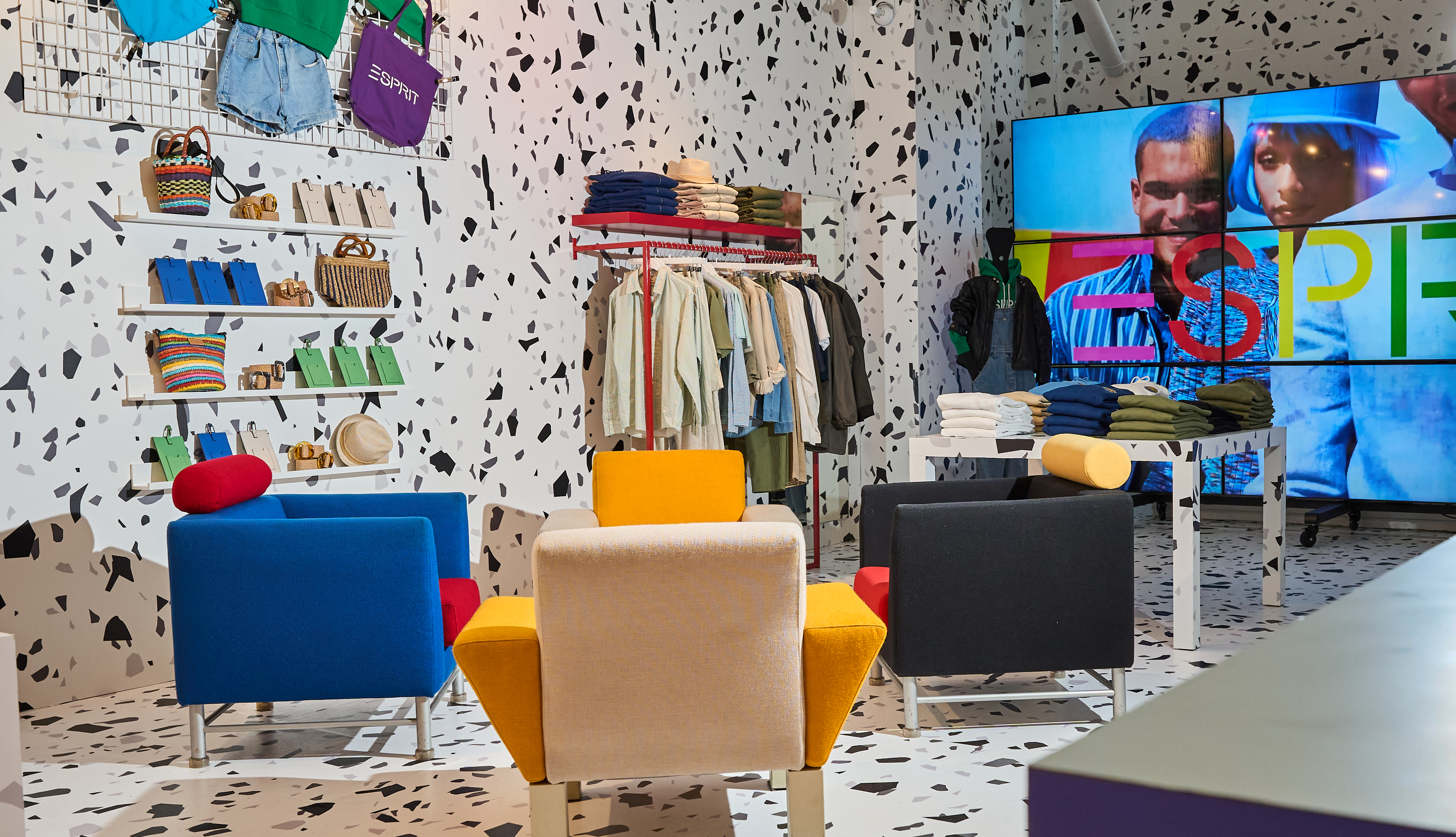
ESPRIT Store

Esprit Holdings Limited (Chinese: 思捷環球控股有限公司) is a global, publicly traded retail company incorporated in Bermuda, with headquarters in North Point, Hong Kong. It also maintains major locations in Ratingen, Germany; Amsterdam, Netherlands; and New York City. The company offers an assortment of clothing, accessories, footwear, jewelry, and housewares under the Esprit label.

Esprit operates in more than 30 markets in Europe, Asia, and America. It has about 20 partner stores in Southeast Asia and about 50 in Latin America. In Europe, the brand has 160 retail stores and approximately 400 franchise stores. It also has two pop-up stores in the United States, located in Los Angeles and New York.

== History ==
=== Early years ===
Founded in 1968, Esprit was the first clothes line established by Susie and Doug Tompkins (also co-founders of The North Face). It initially sold out of a VW bus, with the Tompkinses' San Francisco apartment serving as the brand's headquarters.

In 1979, Esprit brought on graphic designer John Casado—who designed the branding trademark of the first Macintosh computer—to develop the brand's stencil-effect logo.

In 1985, the brand debuted its legendary "Real People Campaign." Photographed by Oliviero Toscani, it featured Esprit employees, architects, and designers, including Ettore Sottsass, the Italian architect and founder of the Memphis Group. Sottsass was also commissioned to build Esprit's European headquarters in Düsseldorf, Germany, and set the visual direction for the brand's retail stores. Other noteworthy architects and designers who contributed to the Esprit brand include Antonio Citterio and Norman Foster.

=== Transitional period ===
Throughout the late 1990s and into the 2000s, Esprit experienced significant and rapid financial growth in multiple markets outside of the United States. At its highest point, Esprit Holdings’ market capitalization exceeded US$20 billion. Since the 2008 financial crisis, the company has faced a series of financial and market-share setbacks. With the onset of the COVID-19 pandemic, Esprit gradually closed all stores in China, Taiwan, Singapore, Hong Kong, Malaysia, and Macau, with Singapore being the first to shut down on 7 April 2020.

=== Brand comeback ===
William Pak was appointed executive director and chief operating officer (COO) in September 2021, became interim CEO in October 2021, and was subsequently named permanent CEO of Esprit in March 2022. William Pak stepped down from the company in 2025. In April 2022, Esprit reentered the Asian market by opening a long-term pop-up store in Seoul, South Korea, followed by another pop-up store in Hong Kong during the summer of 2022. By the fall of 2022, following five years of losses, the company returned to profitability, reporting a $48.5 million profit on $1 billion in revenue.

Ana Andjelic was appointed chief brand officer (CBO) in December 2022 to oversee the brand's creative and marketing teams. In 2023—following the brand's reintroduction to New York City with a short-term pop-up on Prince Street—Esprit unveiled an experiential store space on Greene Street in Soho. As part of the brand's new creative focus and direction, it launched a series of high-profile campaigns by photographer Richard Phibbs.

In April 2024, the Belgian franchise of Esprit filed for bankruptcy, resulting in the expected closure of its 15 self-operated stores and 148 job losses. The Swiss franchise had already filed for bankruptcy in March 2024.

In May 2024, the European operations of Esprit collapsed into administration for the second time in four years. The company stated that the insolvency would affect 1,500 employees, but its operations would continue for the time being. In June 2024, the company's Danish operations filed for bankruptcy. In July 2024, the company's Dutch unit went bankrupt, and in October 2024, Esprit's US operations filed for Chapter 7 bankruptcy.

== Product lines ==
Beginning in 2023, Esprit began to offer a seasonless selection of eight products: a multisystem parka, soft suit, a tracksuit, soft skirts, chunky logo knits, button-down shirts, jeans, and a locker bag. That same year, Esprit eliminated its EDC label and consolidated that line under the Esprit name.

Esprit's apparel line includes essentials, casual sportswear, and specialty collections for men, women, and children. The product range also includes swimwear, underwear, and activewear, as well as accessories such as bags and shoes. Esprit Home offers furniture, carpets, wallpaper, lighting, decor, textiles, and bathroom accessories. The Esprit Kids World line includes maternity clothing, toys, strollers, and nursery furniture.

== See also ==
- List of Hong Kong companies
