= Santana Brothers =

Studio album by Carlos Santana, Jorge Santana and Carlos Hernandez
- Released: September 27, 1994
- Length: 51:51
- Label: Polydor
- Producers: Carlos Santana; Jorge Santana

Carlos Santana, Jorge Santana and Carlos Hernandez chronology
Soul Sacrifice (1994)	Santana Brothers (1994)	As Years Go By (1994)

Professional ratings
Review scores
Source	Rating
AllMusic	2/5 stars

Santana Brothers (sometimes credited as simply Brothers) is a 1994 album by Carlos Santana, his brother Jorge, and his nephew Carlos Hernandez. It reached 191 on the Billboard 200 album chart. To date, it is the most recent Santana solo album.

== Track listing ==
1. "Transmutation/Industrial" (Santana, Santana) – 6:11
2. "Thoughts" (Hernandez) – 2:49
3. "Luz Amor y Vida" (Carlos Santana) – 5:07
4. "En Aranjuez Con Tu Amor" (Joaquín Rodrigo) – 6:04
5. "Contigo (With You)" (Santana, Santana) – 4:53
6. "Blues Latino" (Javier Vargas, Espinoza) – 5:44
7. "La Danza" (Hernandez, Santana, Santana) – 6:53
8. "Brujo" (Hernandez, Carlos Santana) – 4:06
9. "The Trip" (Santana, Santana) – 3:53
10. "Reflections" (Jorge Santana) – 3:43
11. "Morning in Marin" (Djalma de Andrade) – 2:28

== Personnel ==
- Carlos Santana – guitar (tracks 3–10), producer
- Jorge Santana – guitar (tracks 1, 4–5, 7 and 9–11), producer
- Carlos Hernandez – guitar (tracks 1–2 and 7–10)
- Chester Thompson – keyboards (tracks 2–10)
- Myron Dove – bass (tracks 2–10)
- Billy Johnson – drums (tracks 4–8)
- Karl Perazzo – percussion (tracks 2–3 and 5–6), congas (tracks 2–3, 5, 7 and 10), timbales (tracks 3, 5 and 10)
- Mixed by Devon Rietveld (tracks 1–8 and 10–11) and Jim Gaines (tracks 1 and 9)
- Recorded by Arne Frager (tracks 1–3, 9 and 11) and Devon Rietveld
- Recording and mixing assistance by Ken Walden and Kent Matcke
- Mastered by Bernie Grundman

== Charts ==
Chart performance for Santana Brothers
Chart (1994)	Peak position
Australian Albums (ARIA)	157
Swiss Albums (Schweizer Hitparade)	48
US Billboard 200	191
