= Hank Bagby =

American jazz musician

- Born: Clarence Henry Bagby; September 18, 1922; California, U.S.
- Died: December 11, 1993 (aged 71) Stanislaus County, California, U.S.
- Genres: Jazz
- Occupation: Musician
- Instrument: Tenor saxophone

Hank Bagby (born Clarence Henry Bagby, September 18, 1922 – December 11, 1993) was originally a singer around Denver in the mid-1940s. He started playing sax in San Francisco in the late 1940s and worked with such musicians as Leo Wright, Kenny Drew, and Addison Farmer. In the early 1950s, he worked in Los Angeles with Joe Maini, Frank Butler and others. Hank Bagby first started writing seriously while co-leading the Elmo Hope – Hank Bagby Quartet in the late 50s through the early 60s. He worked with the Onzy Matthews Big Band in 1961, which included such greats as Curtis Amy, Dexter Gordon, Harold Land, Carmel Jones and Joe Gordon, to name a few. In late 1961, along with Joe Maini, Bagby headlined a group in a spectacular Jazz Marathon, opposite some of the greatest talent in the country, namely: Bud Shank, Jack Sheldon, Claude Williamson, Ralph Pena, Ben Webster, Joe Albany, Ruth Price, Bill Perkins, and many others. Hank formed the Soultet in January 1964 and produced Opus One. The album gained a 3½ star review in Downbeat magazine.

Hank moved to Modesto, California in 1977 and continued playing tenor saxophone frequenting St. Stans with his group The Hank Bagby Trio which included pianist Ben Gintjee, drummer Buddy Barnhill, bass player Tony Morabite. Hank Bagby also worked as a Stanislaus County substance abuse counselor from 1977 to 1990 before retiring.

== Discography ==
- Hank Bagby Soultet, Opus One (Hank Bagby(tenor sax), Chuck Foster(trumpet), Dave MacKay (musician) (piano), Al Hines(bass), Chiz Harris(drums), Protone Music, 1964)
