= John Casado =

American logo designer and photographer

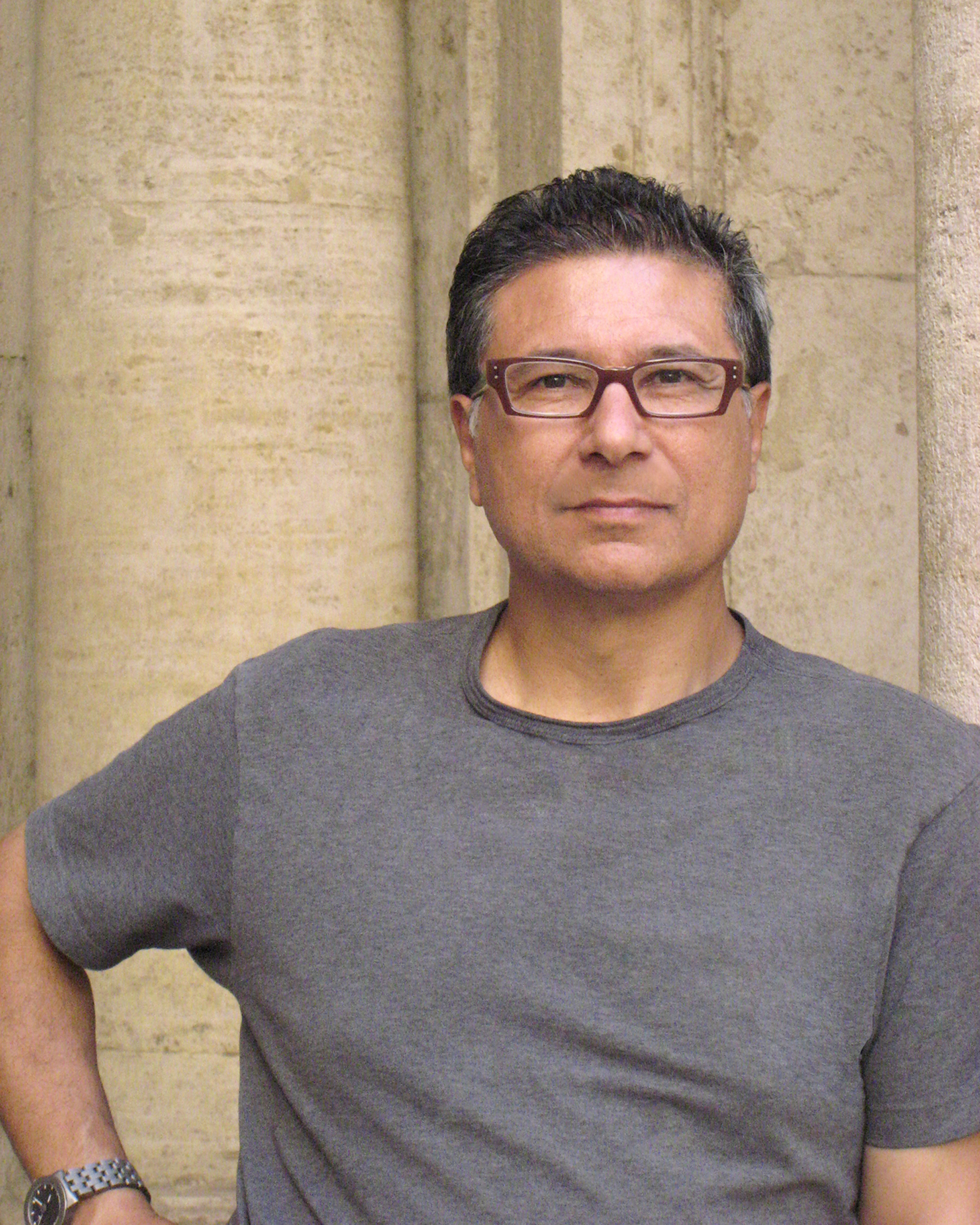
- Born: May 30, 1944 (age 82); East Los Angeles, California
- Education: Art Center School
- Occupations: Graphic designer Photographer; Artist
- Website: casadodesign.com

John Charles Casado (born May 30, 1944) is an American graphic designer, artist and photographer, best known for designing logos for the first Macintosh computer, Esprit, and New Line Cinema, as well as numerous album covers for the Doobie Brothers, Carole King, and others.

== Early life and education ==
Casado was born in East Los Angeles, California. He graduated from Dorsey High School in Los Angeles and then went to the University of California at Los Angeles. He graduated from The Art Center School in Los Angeles, now located in Pasadena and called the Art Center College of Design, in 1964.

== Career ==
=== Advertising and design ===
Because Casado's father was an advertising art director beginning in the early '50s, he knew a lot about the business of advertising and design. Before graduating from the Art Center, he was already teaching their beginning class in advertising. Upon graduating, he went to New York to find his first job as an art director. He ended up in Los Angeles, becoming advertising art director for Young & Rubicam. Casado knew from his father's experience in advertising that there was no loyalty in the profession, so he would change jobs often. Casado had the opportunity to meet many of the best designers in Los Angeles when he was young because they were friendly with his father. Among the many were: Saul Bass, Charles Eames, Jim Cross, Louis Danzinger and Ken Parkhurst.

In 1966, Casado left advertising to work for Saul Bass Design. He was part of the team that created a new trademark for Continental Airlines and packaging for Northern Towels. He also helped storyboard the Academy Award-winning animated documentary short Why Man Creates (1968), directed by Bass.

Macintosh computer logo designed by Casado in 1984

=== Casado Design ===
Casado started his own design firm in 1970. He met Christopher Whorf, art director for Warner Bros. Records, and that relationship opened the door for Casado to do projects with Warner Bros., Capitol Records, A&M Records, United Artists and many smaller labels. He designed the Grammy Award-winning album cover for Mason Proffit’s Come and Gone (1973), art directed by Whorf. In 1978, he created the iconic logotype for The Band and The Last Waltz album and film, directed by Martin Scorsese and featuring appearances from Neil Young, Bob Dylan, Joni Mitchell, Van Morrison and others. During that time, he also created a Warner Bros. Records sampler album, featuring Frank Zappa, which replicated a blister package of baloney making the three records inside baloney color.

Casado designed and/or photographed album covers for: Carole King, Aaron Neville, Barry White, Diana Ross, Ashford and Simpson, Loggins & Messina, Captain Beefheart, John Fahey, Malo, Bonnie Raitt, Arlo Guthrie, Gordon Lightfoot and the first four albums covers for The Doobie Brothers. He designed many posters, including for Deep Purple, The Allman Brothers Band's Eat a Peach album, and Jerry Garcia and Bob Weir of The Grateful Dead. Casado also designed the history of film music for Warner Brothers. During this period, Casado also did movie poster developments for film director Sam Peckinpah.

In 1979, Casado developed and designed the stencil-effect logo for women's apparel company Esprit. In 1981, he moved to San Francisco, focused primarily on corporate work. He designed the branding trademark of the first Macintosh computer, introduced in 1984, for Tom Hughes, Steve Jobs and Apple. Often referred to as the "Picasso logo", its style was actually inspired by Matisse. He also designed the New Line Cinema logo.

Casado's poster for Jeanne Marc, fashion, was placed in the permanent collection of the Museum of Modern Art in New York. He has also designed more than a dozen posters for the Mill Valley Film Festival.

=== Photography ===
In 1988, Casado became a professional photographer, shooting advertising and fashion photographs. His photographs have been in exhibits at galleries across the United States, and some of his photographs are in the permanent collection at the New Orleans Museum of Art.
