= The Lovelites =

American vocal group

- Also known as: Patti Hamilton & The Lovelites
- Origin: Chicago, Illinois
- Genres: R&B, soul
- Years active: 1967–1973
- Past members: Patti Hamilton; Rozena Petty; Barbara Peterman; Ardell McDaniel; Joni Berlmon; Rhonda Grayson; Deniece Chandler

The Lovelites were an American vocal group, based in Chicago, originally composed of the sisters Patti Hamilton and Rozena Petty plus their friend, Barbara Peterman. In 1967, the trio recorded for the local Chicago record label, Bandera Records. In 1968, Peterman left the group and was replaced by Ardell McDaniel.

One year after the change in lineup, the single, "How Can I Tell My Mom And Dad (That I've Been Bad)" was released on Lock Records. The tune, written by lead vocalist Patti Hamilton and record producer Clarence Johnson, tells of a teen, abandoned by her boyfriend, who imagines horrible repercussions when she tells her parents what's happened; the subject, teen pregnancy, was then still largely taboo on radio airwaves, and the single went on to sell 55,000 copies locally and 400,000 nationally, peaking at No. 15 on Billboard's soul chart, and landing the group a recording contract with the MCA Records imprint, Uni Records. By this time, the group had also undergone yet another personnel change, as Joni Berlmon stepped in for Rozena Petty.

The girls continued working with Johnson as well as another producer, Johnny Cameron, and went on to release their only album, With Love from the Lovelites. Although the album included "How Can I Tell My Mom and Dad" and the singles "Oh My Love" and "This Love Is Real". The album was not a commercial success. Robert Pruter the Chicago based music writer has called it a real treasure while John Lias, the English soul music writer, praises the late teenage vocals of Hamilton and Berlmon and agrees that it is an album to treasure.

After leaving Uni in 1970, Johnson started up the Lovelite imprint, and the group immediately hit with "My Conscience", which reportedly sold 70,000 in Chicago and 400,000 nationwide. The group released a handful more singles on the label, and then in 1971, Rhonda Grayson replaced Ardell McDaniel.

By 1972, the girls had signed to Cotillion Records, where they released two singles billed as Patti & The Lovelites. By 1973, the group had disbanded. In 1999 Patti Hamilton and Chicago DJ Herb Kent released a retrospective of Lovelites recordings that included a number of unissued tracks including "I'm Not Like The Others" with a lead by Deniece Williams (Chandler), who had briefly joined the Lovelites prior to an offer to work with Stevie Wonder.

== Discography ==
=== Singles ===
- "I Found Me a Lover" / "You Better Stop It" - Bandera 2515, 1967
- "How Can I Tell My Mom and Dad" / "Hey! Stars of Tomorrow" (instrumental) - Lock 723, 1969
- "How Can I Tell My Mom and Dad" / "Hey! Stars of Tomorrow" (instrumental) - UNI 55181, 1969
- "Who You Gonna Hurt Now" / "Oh My Love" - UNI 55222, 1970
- "This Love Is Real" / "Oh My Love" - UNI 55242, 1970
- "My Conscience" / "Man in My Life" - Lovelite 01, 1970
- "Bumpy Road Ahead" / "Love Is Pretty" - Lovelite 02, 1971
- "My Baby Loves Me" / "The Way That You Treat Me Baby" - Lovelite 03, 1971
- "I'm The One That You Need" / "Love Bandit" - Cotillion 44145, 1972
- "Is This Lovin' In Your Heart" / "We've Got The Real Thing" - Cotillion 44161, 1972
- "Love So Strong" / "Oh My Love" - Lovelite 1008, 1973
- "Get It Off My Conscience" / "Oh What A Day" - Lovelite 1500, 1975
- "I'm Not Like The Others" - Lovelites one side only. Grapevine UK G2K 45-145, 2004

=== Albums ===
- With Love from the Lovelites - UNI 73081, 1969
- This Love Is Real - P-Vine 2904, 1994 (Japan only)
- The Lovelite Years - Lovelite 1021, 1999
