= Suavecito (Malo song) =

Single by Malo

from the album Malo
- B-side: "Nena"
- Released: February 1972 (U.S.)
- Recorded: 1971
- Genre: Chicano rock, jazz fusion, funk
- Length: 6:36 (Album); 3:25 (Single)
- Label: Warner Bros.
- Songwriters: Richard Bean, Abel Zarate, Pablo Tellez

"Suavecito" is a song recorded by Malo in 1971. It was the lead single from their debut LP, Malo.

== Background ==
Suavecito means "soft" or "smooth" in Spanish. The song has been called "The Chicano National Anthem".

== Chart history ==
The song was the band's biggest hit: the only U.S. Top-20 (#18) and Canada (#14) during the spring of 1972. It also reached #8 on the U.S. Adult Contemporary chart.

Chart (1972)	Peak position
Canada RPM Top Singles	14
U.S. Billboard Hot 100	18
U.S. Billboard Easy Listening	8
U.S. Cash Box Top 100	12
