= Frazier River =

US musical group

- Frazier River, 1996.

Background information
- Origin: Cincinnati, Ohio, United States
- Genre: Country
- Years active: 1991–1996
- Label: Decca Nashville
- Past members: Danny Frazier; Chuck Adair; Greg Amburgy; Brian "Gigs" Baverman; Jim Morris; Bob Wilson

Frazier River was an American country music group formed in Cincinnati, Ohio in 1991 and disbanded in 1996. The group consisted of lead singer Danny Frazier and five musicians, Chuck Adair, Greg Amburgy, Brian "Gigs" Baverman, Jim Morris and Bob Wilson. Frazier River recorded one album for Decca Records Nashville and released three singles, two of which charted on the Billboard Hot Country Singles & Tracks (now Hot Country Songs) charts.

== History ==
Frazier River was founded in 1991 in Cincinnati, Ohio by Danny Frazier (lead vocals, guitar), Chuck Adair (guitar), Greg Amburgy (keyboards, guitars, background vocals), Brian "Gigs" Baverman (drums), Jim Morris (keyboards, background vocals) and Bob Wilson (background vocals, bass guitar). They signed to Decca Records Nashville in 1996 and released a self-titled debut album for the label. This album produced two chart singles on the Billboard country charts: "She Got What She Deserves" at number 57 and "Tangled Up in Texas" at number 67. Country Standard Time critic Robert Loy gave a mostly favorable review of the album, comparing Frazier's "almost operatic" voice to that of Gary Morris and saying that his "voice even rescues lesser songs" on the album. He cited "Last Request" and "Heaven Is Smiling" as standout tracks. After Frazier River disbanded, Frazier, Morris and Baverman founded a second band called the Danny Frazier Band, with Chris Goins and Jerry Owen.

== Discography ==
=== Studio albums ===
Title	Album details
Frazier River	Release date: February 27, 1996; Label: Decca Nashville

=== Singles ===
Year	Single	Peak chart positions	
Year	Single	US Country	CAN Country
1996	"She Got What She Deserves"	57	60
1996	"Tangled Up in Texas"	67	84
1996	"Last Request"	—	—
"—" denotes releases that did not chart

=== Music videos ===
Year	Video	Director
1996	"Tangled Up in Texas"	
1996	"Last Request"	Charley Randazzo
