= Ad Lib (TV series) =

1981 television series

Ad Lib is a TV program hosted by composer and pianist Phil Moore and produced by Cinema Arts Productions Inc. that aired in 1981. Ad Lib featured noted jazz artists performing for the video camera while recording their musical albums at various recording studios. The series was repeated in 1982 and in 1984.

- Season 1, Episode 1: Marilyn McCoo & Billy Davis Jr.
- Season 1, Episode 2: Kenny Burrell & Ernie Andrews
- Season 1, Episode 3: Jimmy Smith
- Season 1, Episode 4: Jon Hendricks
- Season 1, Episode 5: Dianne Reeves & Snooky Young*
- Season 1, Episode 6: Jeanne Moore & Marshall Royal
- Season 1, Episode 7: Dorothy Donegan/Mary Davis/The Tonight Show All-Stars
- Season 1, Episode 8: O.C. Smith & Scatman Crothers
- Season 1, Episode 9: Freda Payne & Stanley Turrentine
- Season 1, Episode 10: Red Norvo/Clora Bryant/Rozelle Gayle
- Season 1, Episode 11: Legends of Jazz: Dixieland
- Season 1, Episode 12: Jimmy Witherspoon/John Collins
- Season 1, Episode 13: Linda Hopkins/Paul Smith
- Season 1, Episode 14: Dianne Reeves/James Newton/Allan Iwohara
- Season 1, Episode 15: Jimmy Witherspoon/Marshall Royal
- Season 1, Episode 16: Maxine Weldon/Greg Poree
- Season 1, Episode 17: Freda Payne/Jerome Richardson
- Season 1, Episode 18: O.C. Smith/Judy Carmichael
- Season 1, Episode 19: Willie Bobo: 1
- Season 1, Episode 20: Linda Hopkins/Eddie 'Lockjaw' Davis
- Season 1, Episode 21: Ester Phillips/Red Holloway
- Season 1, Episode 22: Spanky Wilson/Eddie 'Cleanhead' Vinson
- Season 1, Episode 23: Dorothy Donegan/Spanky Wilson
- Season 1, Episode 24: Dorothy Donegan/Buster Cooper
- Season 1, Episode 25: Billy Daniels/Eddie Harris
- Season 1, Episode 26: Billy Daniels/Blossom Dearie
- Season 1, Episode 27: Michael Rogers Band/Dee Dee Gray
- Season 1, Episode 28: Michael Rogers Band/Kiki Francisco
- Season 1, Episode 29: Willie Bobo: 2
- Season 1, Episode 30: Willie Bobo: 3
- Season 1, Episode 31: Maxine Weldon/Pee Wee Crayton: 1
- Season 1, Episode 32: Maxine Weldon/Pee Wee Crayton: 2
- Season 1, Episode 33: Damita Jo/Papa John Creach
- Season 1, Episode 34: Damita Jo/Papa John Creach 2
- Season 1, Episode 35: Bill Henderson/Joyce Collins/Dave Mackay
- Season 1, Episode 36: Sam Fletcher/Pee Wee Crayton
- Season 1, Episode 37: Kenny Rankin/Terry Gibbs
- Season 1, Episode 38: Dianne Reeves/Billy Childs
- Season 1, Episode 39: Dianne Reeves/Ronald Powell
- Season 1, Episode 40: Freddie Hubbard: 1
- Season 1, Episode 41: Freddie Hubbard: 2
- Season 1, Episode 42: Tanya Maria/Laurindo Almeida (#1)
- Season 1, Episode 43: Tanya Maria/Laurindo Almeida (#2)
- Season 1, Episode 44: Charles Brown/Mundell Lowe
- Season 1, Episode 45: Mark Murphy/Pete & Conte Condoli 1
- Season 1, Episode 46: Mark Murphy/Pete & Conte Condoli 2
