= Jerry Mason (singer) =

American musician

Jerry Mason (born 1942, Pittsburgh, Pennsylvania) is an American former singer, songwriter, guitar player, and entertainer during America's rock and roll era. Mason currently lives in Southern California. Mason is of Romani (Gypsy) heritage.

Mason replaced one of the original members of The Four Lads, singer Bernie Torish, for a while.

== Recordings ==
- "The Four Winds and the Seven Seas", Kapp Records, New York, New York, 1959
- "Strange Feelings", Kapp Records, New York, New York, 1959
- "You Are Lonely", Chess Records, Chicago, Illinois, 1960
- "You’re Cruel", Chess Records, Chicago, Illinois, 1960
- "Jones Street", Swan Records, Philadelphia, Pennsylvania, 1962
- "Sweet Enough For You", Swan Records, Philadelphia, Pennsylvania, 1962

== Television shows Mason appeared on ==
- The Big Beat, New York, New York, 1959, producer and host Alan Freed
- Shindig, Hollywood, California, 1965, producer Jack Good, host Jimmy O'Neil Video on YouTube
- Hollywood A Go-Go, Hollywood, California, 1965, producer Al Burton, host Sam Riddle Video on YouTube
- Joey Bishop and Regis Philbin Telethon, Philadelphia, Pennsylvania, 1970
