= Bruce Eskovitz =

American jazz saxophonist

Bruce Eskovitz (born February 2, 1955, Los Angeles, CA.) is an American jazz saxophonist, composer, and arranger. He has been active as a solo artist, as a session musician, and as the leader of the nine-member ensemble Bruce Eskovitz Jazz Orchestra.

== Biography ==
Born in Los Angeles, California, Eskovitz began playing the saxophone professionally when he was thirteen. Before he was twenty, he had started to compose music for the Merv Griffin Show. He holds a Bachelor of Arts degree from California State University, Northridge, as well as a master's degree in Jazz Studies and a Doctor of Musical Arts degree in Jazz Composition from the University of Southern California. He released his self-titled debut album on the Orange County, California-based Cexton Records in 1992. It was followed by the Sonny Rollins tribute album One for Newk in 1995. His other albums include Conversations, which was the result of a collaboration with Bill Mays. Eskovitz has also recorded or performed with Joe Cocker, Natalie Cole, and Dwight Yoakam, among other artists. He is the director of the instrumental music program at the Windward School in West Los Angeles, California, and previously founded the jazz music studies program at the Crossroads School in Santa Monica.

== Discography ==
=== Solo ===
- Bruce Eskovitz (Cexton, 1992)
- One for Newk (Koch Jazz, 1995)

=== With Bill Mays ===
- Conversations (Azica, 2002)

=== As Bruce Eskovitz Jazz Orchestra ===
- Regions (The Bruce Eskovitz Jazz Orchestra, 2003)
- Invitation (Pacific Coast Jazz, 2007)
