= Vicky Hamilton (musician) =

American jazz singer-songwriter-composer

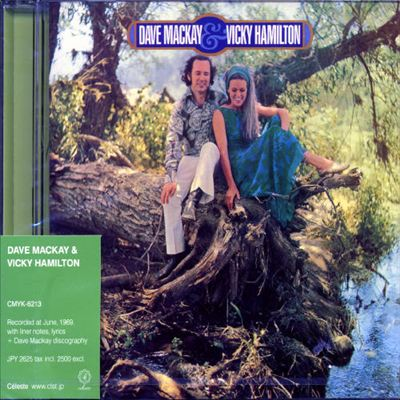
- Self Titled 1969 ABC Impulse LP Dave MacKay and Vicky Hamilton

Background information
- Also known as: Jean Johnson; Jeannie Johnson; Nikki Price
- Born: Sandra Jeanette Johnson; January 1937 (age 89); Detroit, Michigan, U.S.
- Education: Mumford High School; San Francisco State University; Wayne State University
- Genres: Jazz
- Years active: 1950 – 1969
- Labels: Epic, Impulse
- Spouse(s): Dave Mackay (m. 1962)

Jean M. Johnson (born Sandra Jeanette Johnson; January 1937), billed variously as Jean Johnson, Jeannie Johnson, Nikki Price, and–from 1968 on–Vicky Hamilton, was an American jazz singer-songwriter-composer, best known now for her collaborations with jazz pianist, singer-composer, Dave MacKay, beginning shortly after their marriage in 1962. Shortly before their meeting, she also made a well-received, self-titled solo LP for the Epic Records label, and, in 1963 at the Hollywood Bowl, was the featured female soloist performing Gordon Jenkins selections under the composer's baton.

== Early life and career ==
Born in Detroit, Michigan in January 1937, and christened Sandra Jeanette Johnson, she was the youngest of three (the others being brothers Kenneth M. and Robert B.), born to Virginia Montgomery (née Aspinwall) and Robert Marston Johnson. Her mother was an executive at Chrysler Corporation, and her father, a paint company executive and professor of business administration at Wayne State University. Johnson attended Mumford High School, San Francisco State University, and, back home in Detroit, her father's workplace, Wayne State, where she received her bachelor's degree.

In February 1956, Detroit Free Press columnist Dick Osgood reported that "Jeannie Johnson, Detroit girl, is being kept busy with appearances on the Perry Como Show, Godfrey and Friends, and umpteen singing commercials". A full-page profile/interview, published two months later in the Chicago Tribune, goes into greater detail. In the summer of 1955, Johnson did summer stock in Warwick, Rhode Island.

In February 1957, she performed with veteran Modesto-based pianist, Tommy Doyle, at The Sands in Las Vegas. In May 1958, Johnson revisited Vegas, with saxophonist Charlie Ventura at the Desert Spa Lounge, and, three months later, was on the bill at San Francisco's Hungry i with the "world's foremost authority", Professor Irwin Corey, and the Kingston Trio.

Johnson's first appearance as "Nikki Price" occurred in August 1961, and Indianapolis clubgoers–or at least those who read the Indianapolis Star–were in for some potentially thunder-stealing happenstance when her Indy nightclub debut, on the bill with comic Phil Foster, coincided with–and, at least in this case, was advertised alongside–that of one like-named, cinematic canine protagonist, courtesy of Walt Disney Productions.

The following January, Variety reported that Price had been signed by Columbia Records and that her first album was to be recorded that month.

== Reception ==
Despite having hit record stores about midway through 1962, Price's debut LP, entitled by Epic, Nikki; Introducing the Beautiful Nikki Price, ended up getting "overlooked in the July releases", as later noted by Daily News critic Douglas Watt. As for his own two-month-late take, it is, by and large, positive. Despite finding her style "as yet [...] pretty tentative [and] flawed by gaucheries", he insists that "the talent's there" and detects in her "an appealing, unaffected voice capable of negotiating a wide variety of tunes".

Variety's review was even more belated but far less tentative in its praise.

Right from the first side, "Would'ja For a Big Green Apple," a seldom-heard Johnny Mercer tune, Nikki Price projects with impact. Although she differs from the run-of-the-mill songstress heard on discs these days, her style isn't so offbeat as to appeal only to a specialized few fans who've caught her work along the intime nitery circuit. She has a mass attraction that will surely develop once the spinners start giving the disc its due exposure. Although she toys effectively with such popular numbers like "Fools Rush In," "If I Were a Bell" and "My Love Is a Wanderer," the unfamiliar entries like "Peel Me a Grape," "A Thousand Blue Bubbles" and "Sweet Pumpkin," as well as the aforementioned "Would'ja For a Big Red Apple," help her impress as a vocalist with a big potential.

Similarly inclined, one month later still, was the trade paper's take–credited to Jose (aka Joe Cohen)–on Price's recently formed night club act (with recently wed husband Dave Mackay), specifically regarding their November 1962 engagement at New York's Left Bank. "Miss Price, at this point," notes Cohen, "brings a highly developed artistry to the podium. She goes for the unusual, vocally, but she brings these items to a universal level that is readily understood and appreciated."

In January 1963, the couple appeared at New York's Village Vanguard. Although understandably overshadowed by the top-billed performer on that date, the already famously controversial Lenny Bruce, the pair–Price, in particular–receives a brief but decided thumbs up at the review's conclusion.

On the bill in a return is the husband and wife team, pianist David Mackay and singer Nikki Price. Mackay, with rhythm backing, turns in a nice instrumental set, and Miss Price[sic] is first rate with a sophisticated book sung with jazz overtones. Her act builds from a slow start (most likely calculated) with a brace of tunes from 'The Wizard of Oz' to a very hip, upbeat special on the famous Mae West line, 'Beulah, peel me a grape.

Reviewing their appearance in July 1963 at the Beverly Hills nitery, Ye Little Club, Daily Variety's reviewer makes note of Price's "extensive range [and] stratosphere-pierc[ing" upper register, while simultaneously assuring readers that her "jazz motivation and feeling never wavers". In the midst of that ongoing engagement, Price was cast as the lead female vocalist–opposite baritone/narrator Bill Lee–in live renditions of Gordon Jenkins' "The Girl on the Rock" (from his Seven Dreams) and the Manhattan Tower suite, performed at the Hollywood Bowl, with the composer conducting.

Following a near five-year absence (presumably devoted at least in some measure to her part in composing, arranging, and/or otherwise preparing the original material performed on their three jointly produced albums), Johnson / Price finally resurfaced in 1968, but this time under the name by which she would become best remembered. Described in the Citizen-News as "a female singer with a real jazz feeling, note sustaining power and a good sound", Hamilton, along with MacKay, bass player Chuck Domanico, drummer Joe Porcaro, and reed man Ira Schulman, comprised the Concert Jazz Quintet, featured that year at the Pilgrimage Theater Spring Jazz Festival

New York Times critic Rex Reed wrote in 1969 of their self-titled album:

Vicky Hamilton is a vocalist of profound musical intelligence, wit and sensitivity who seems years ahead of her time. Together [with Dave Mackay] they have written most of the superb material in this album and sing it in an awesomely impressive jazz style. ... There are only two cuts here in a conventional time pattern; most are in odd time changes that flip from 5 to 7, with intervals that can only be described as microtonal. One number, written and sung within an inch of its life by Miss Hamilton, is called "Elephant Song". It took [their record producer] six hours .. to transcribe it. But that should not concern the listener, only the beauty and brilliance of the end result. ... "Elephant Song", which reminded me of the kind of whimsical lyrics Dory Previn writes, has the rich ebullience of a child's first trip to the circus.

"There isn't one band on this disk", he added, "that could be considered less than perfect. ... Their up tunes are filled with joy and sass, and their ballads are lush and hypnotic. .... Miss Hamilton sings like a dream".

Other reviewers were also positive. One said, "a very good blending of voices ... always gentle, never too loud. ... a very tasteful album - quite surprising in fact." Another also commented, "The mellow voices of Dave and Vicky blend beautifully with the jazz sounds for some unusual effects", while a third found them "fresh and stimulting [sic] in the tradition of Jackie and Roy ... experts at injecting unusual meters into their approach, giving their original compositions an off-beat style."

== Personal life ==
In February 1958, while still working as Jeannie Johnson, her planned March 16 "merge" with Bobby Johnson, manager of the Drawing Room (a bar located on Van Ness and Union), was reported by San Francisco Examiner night club editor Ivan Paul. Approximately one week prior to that date came news that the marriage was off, and thus, "Jeannie Johnson, SF's 'Wilson Girl', (Note: So designated by Examiner night club editor Frank Funge aka Ivan Paul. The term itself references columnist Earl Wilson and any young starlet displaying the kind of proportions–i.e. big bust and big behind-reputed to be his ideal.) is on the loose again".

In the summer of 1962, giving her name as Jean M. Price, she married pianist Dave MacKay, whom she met earlier that year, and with whom she would presently begin their near decade-long collaboration (notwithstanding the later stage-name change.)

In 1971, in the course of reviewing a live performance by Dave Mackay, Thom McGraham of the Valley News made reference to "the late Vicky Hamilton". Despite the complete absence of any contemporaneous news reporting whatsoever regarding Hamilton's supposed death (including even the most meager paid funeral announcement), that one statement has been cited to document that death.

However, on January 6, 1980, Hamilton's father, Robert Marston Johnson, died. Judging from his obituary, in which the named survivors are "wife, Molly; children, Jean Spear, Robert B. and Kenneth M.", his daughter, the former Mrs. Mackay, was indeed "departed" (from Mackay, that is), but not in the sense that seems to have been inferred by McGraham. Indeed, she was–and, quite possibly, still is–not dead, but simply divorced and evidently remarried.

== Discography ==
- Nikki: Introducing the Lovely Nikki Price (arr. Fred Karlin, Joe Say, Epic, 1962)
- Dave MacKay & Vicky Hamilton, Self Titled (Ira Schulman, Ray Neapolitan, Joe Porcaro, Francisco Aguabella, Impulse, 1969)
- Dave MacKay & Vicky Hamilton, Rainbows (Joe Pass, Ira Schulman, Chuck Domanico, Colin Bailey, Impulse, 1970)
- Dave MacKay with Vicky Hamilton, Hands (Andy Simpkins, Joey Baron, Ira Schulman, Chuck Domanico, Joe Porcaro, Ray Neapolitan, Discovery, 1983, Recorded in 1969 & 1983)
