= Dave Mackay (musician) =

American jazz musician (1932–2020)

David Owen Mackay (March 24, 1932 – July 29, 2020) was an American jazz pianist, singer-composer with roots in the works of Art Tatum, Bud Powell, and Bill Evans, who favored the standards of the 1940s and 1950s and the bossa novas of Luíz Eça, Antonio Carlos Jobim, and João Gilberto when performing.

== Biography ==
Mackay was born in Syracuse, New York. He attended Trinity College in Hartford, Connecticut from 1950 to 1954, where he was the first blind student to graduate. He then attended Boston University from 1956 to 1958, where he studied with Margaret Charloff. Mackay also studied with Lennie Tristano in New York City, then at the Lenox School of Jazz where he studied with Bill Evans, and lastly at The Hartford School of Music where he studied with Asher Zlotnik.

In the mid-1960s, Mackay joined the Hindustani Jazz Sextet with Don Ellis, Harihar Rao, who played sitar and tabla, vibraphonist Emil Richards, drummer Steve Bohannon, bassists Chuck Domanico and Ray Neapolitan. The band performed mainly original compositions which had titles like "Sweet Nineteen", "Turks Works", and "Bombay Bossa Nova". Mackay also played with the Don Ellis Orchestra in the mid-1960s. The Don Ellis Orchestra was distinguished by its unusual instrumentation (which in its early days had up to three bassists and three drummers), incorporated Indian musical elements into modern big-band writing, and different time signatures such as5/4,7/8, and9/4, and more complex rhythmic cycles like 19/4 and 27/16 and its occasionally wacky humor (highlighted by an excess of false endings) and an openness towards using rock rhythms. In 1966, the Don Ellis Orchestra earned a place at the Monterey Jazz Festival. Following this successful breakthrough performance, the band performed at the Pacific Jazz Festival in October 1966, and at Shelly's Manne Hole in March 1967, releasing segments of each on 1967s Live in 3 2/3 4 Time (Pacific Jazz).

In the late-1960s, Mackay and Vicky Hamilton formed a duo and produced two recordings together. The albums include sunshine pop and the groovy side of jazz in many odd time signatures. The duo sings together on most of their tracks, with a mixed male/female vocal approach. Mackay plays Fender Rhodes and piano on the albums. The tunes are mostly originals penned by the pair, and instrumentation on the record includes flute and saxes from Ira Schulman and guitar from Joe Pass.

In the mid-1970s, Dave Mackay, Bill Henderson, and Joyce Collins formed a unique trio which toured the northwest and gained favorable reviews. The trio recorded two Grammy nominated albums for Discovery: Street of Dreams (1980) and Johnny Mercer Tribute. In 1981, Mackay, Henderson, and Collins performed their music on the television show "Ad Lib", hosted by composer and pianist Phil Moore.

In the late-1980s, Dave Mackay, Lori Bell, and Ron Satterfield formed the group "Interplay". Their first album titled Interplay was selected on the Grammy ballot in four categories, including Best Instrumental Composition; Dave Mackay – (Joyful), Best Instrumental Solo; Dave Mackay – (Joyful), and best Jazz Instrumental Performance of a Group; "Interplay". The group's second album is titled Dave Mackay and Interplay, Live at the New York Grill.

In the 1990s, Dave Mackay teamed up with Stephanie Haynes. The duo recorded a CD called Two On A Swing for Why Not Records which was Stephanie Haynes' own label. On their CD, Mackay is sometimes only barely hinting at the more conventional chords to the standards with hair-raising accompaniment. The interplay between voice and piano on "Easy to Love" and the witty "Everything But You" are high points on this very satisfying and sometimes unpredictable CD.

In the 2000s Mackay teamed up with John Giannelli on bass and Joe Correro on drums performing Bill Evans tunes in a celebration of the Life and Music of bassist Scott LaFaro. The trio recorded one of the shows at Giannelli Square.

In the 2000s, Mackay also teamed up with bassist Kenny Wild and singer Tierney Sutton performing at the LA Jazz Club Monteleons. Typical set included the songs I Can't Get Started, Evergreen, Spring Is Here, Cherokee, It Never Entered My Mind, Moon and Sand, Only the Lonely, Blue Skies, I've Never Been in Love Before, Summer Me, Winter Me, and With Every Breath I Take. The Jazz critic Roger Crane described the music as "sounds of surprise".

In the 2010s, Dave teamed up with singer Miki Purnell, Tamir Hendelman, Lori Bell, Joey Carano, Bob Magnusson, Kevin Cox, and Tony Aros. The team recorded the album "Swingin' to the Sea"

Mackay has also performed with Serge Chaloff, Sonny Stitt, Bob Wilber, Bobby Hackett, Jim Hall, Don Ellis, Emil Richards, Shelly Manne, Chet Baker, Joe Pass, Warne Marsh, Kai Winding, Stephanie Haynes, and Tierney Sutton at some of the top Jazz clubs in the country including, Boston's Storeyville and Jazz Workshop, New York's Left Bank and Village Vanguard, and Chicago's Mr. Kelly's, Shelly's Manne Hole, The Lighthouse, Donte's Jazz Supper Club, and the Samoa House.

Mackay's original compositions include "Love Will Win", "Melissa", "Hands", "Joyful", "Blues for Polly-O", "Three for Five", "Blessings and Free", Samba For Vicky", "Now" and "Here". "Now" and "Here" were later recorded by Cal Tjader, and "Samba For Vicky" was later recorded by the Baja Marimba Band. In addition Dave co-wrote "Like Me", "Peek-A-Boo" and "Will-O-The-Wisp". Mackay also wrote a majority of the music (with lyricist Barbara Schill) for a hit stage musical comedy entitled "Is It Just Me, Or Is It Hot In Here?" (music by Dave Mackay & Barbara Schill; book & lyrics by Barbara Schill). It appeared to sold-out audiences (1995–1998) first at the Hollywood Roosevelt Hotel, then CBS Studio Center in Burbank, the Odyssey Theatre and Century City Playhouse.

Critics have described Mackay's music as lyrical and fluent, and have ranked her among Southland's leading pianists.

== Discography ==
=== As leader ===
- Dave Mackay and Interplay, Live at the New York Grill (Lori Bell, Dave Mackay, Ron Satterfield, God Now Records, 2004)
- Dave Mackay, Lori Bell, and Ron Satterfield, Interplay Self Titled (Webster's Last Word, 1997)
- Dave Mackay, Lori Bell, and Ron Satterfield, Interplay Promotional DVD (Lori Bell, 1993)
- Stephanie Haynes and Dave Mackay, Two On A Swing (Why Not Records, 1994)
- The Dave Mackay Trio, Windows (bassist Andy Simpkins, drummer Ralph Penland, MAMA Foundation, 1990)
- Dave Mackay & Lori Bell Sextet, Take Me To Brazil (Bob Magnusson Bass, Duncan Moore Drums, John Pisano Guitar, Melissa Mackay Vocals, Discovery, 1988)
- Dave Mackay Trio, Love Will Win (Lori Bell and bassist Andy Simpkins, Discovery, 1983)
- Dave Mackay, Andy Simpkins, Joey Baron, Happying (Studio 7 Records, 1977)
- Dave Mackay with Vicky Hamilton, Hands (Andy Simpkins, Joey Baron, Ira Schulman, Chuck Domanico, Joe Porcaro, Ray Neapolitan, Discovery, 1983, Recorded in 1969 & 1983)
- Dave Mackay & Vicky Hamilton, Rainbows (Joe Pass, Ira Schulman, Chuck Domanico, Colin Bailey, Impulse, 1970)
- Dave Mackay & Vicky Hamilton, Self Titled (Ira Schulman, Ray Neapolitan, Joe Porcaro, Francisco Aguabella, Impulse, 1969)
- The Dave Mackay Trio, Plays Progressive (Dave Mackay(Piano), Don Mackay(Drums), Cliff Gunn(bass), Craft Recording Co. 1955)

=== As sideman ===
- Swingin' to the Sea (Dr Miki Purnell, Tamir Hendelman, Lori Bell, and Dave MacKay, Joey Carano, Bob Magnusson, Kevin Cox, and Tony Aros, Sweet and Lovely Music, 2013)
- Lori Bell, Self Titled (Lori Bell (flute), Dave Mackay (piano), Ron Satterfield (guitar), Beezwax, 2002)
- Emil Richards, LunTana (Francisco Aguabella, Luis Conte, Chuck Domanico, Michael Lang, Dave Mackay, Al McKibbon, Joe Porcaro, Emil Richards and Efrain Toro, Interworld, 1996)
- Sing Me a Kern Song (Lynne Jackson(vp), Mike Palter(vb), Dave Frishberg(vp), Bill Henderson(v), Dave Mackay(vp), Joyce Collins(vp), "Putter" Smith(b), Anthony Simpkins(b), Nick Ceroli(d), DoDo Records, 1984)
- Bill Henderson, A Tribute to Johnny Mercer (Joyce Collins & Dave Mackay, Joey Baron, Discovery, 1982)
- Bill Henderson, Something's Gotta Give (Dave Mackay, Jim Hughart, Jimmie Smith, Joyce Collins, Pete Christlieb, Discovery, 1979)
- Bill Henderson, Street of Dreams (Bill Henderson (vo), Joyce Collins (vo, p), Dave Mackay (el-p, p), Pate Christlieb(ts), Jim Hughart (b), Jimmie Smith(dr), Discovery, 1979)
- Warne Marsh Quartet, Live at Donte's (Warne Marsh (ts), Dave Mackay (p), Fred Atwood (b), Frank Severino (d), Private Recordings, 1976)
- Bill Henderson Live, 'Joey' Revisited (Steve LaSpina's 'Lespina', Dave Mackay 'Malachai', Bill Henderson, Joyce Collins, Jerry Coleman, discovery 1976)
- Bill Henderson and His Special Friends Live at the Times (Joyce Collins, Dave Mackay, Tom Azarello & Jimmy Smith, Discovery, 1975)
- Warne Marsh Quartet, Live at The Times Restaurant (Warne Marsh (ts), Lou Levy (p), Dave Mackay (p), Fred Atwood (b), Dick Borden (d), Private Recordings, 1975)
- Emil Richards, The Spirit of 1976 (Live at Donte's with Emil Richards, Dave Mackay, Ray Neapolitan, Joe Porcaro, Mark Stevens, Impulse 1969)
- The Aquarians, Jungle Grass (Vladimir Vassilieff, Bobby Hutcherson, Joe Pass, Francisco Aquabella, Dave Mackay, Creative Complex and UNI,1969)
- Emil Richards, Journey to Bliss (Dave Mackay, Dennis Budimir, Tommy Tedesco, Ray Neapolitan, Joe Porcaro, Michael Craden, Mark Stevens, Impulse 1967)
- Emil Richards, New time Element (Featuring Emil Richards, Tom Scott, Paul Beaver, Dave Mackay, Uni, 1967)
- Chet Baker, In a Soulful Mood (live 1966 & 1968, Sal Nistico, Phil Urso, Dave Mackay, Lorne Lofsky, Chris Connors, Chuck Domanico, Art Frank, Harry Kevis Jr., Music Club, 1997)
- Chet Baker, Live at Pueblo, Colorado (live 1966, Phil Urso, Dave Mackay, Chuck Domanico, Harry Kevis Jr., CC Baker Productions, 1992)
- Chet Baker, Round Midnight(Chet Baker, Harry Keevis Jr., Dave Mackay, Chuck Domanico, Phil Urso, Recorded live in Pueblo, Colorado in 1966, City Hall Records 2003)
- Chet Baker, Live at Gaetano's (Phil Urso, Dave Mackay, Chuck Domanico, Harry Kevis Jr., Pueblo, Colorado., summer 1966)
- Chet Baker, Milestone (Phil Urso, Dave Mackay, Chuck Domanico, Harry Kevis Jr., Pueblo, Colorado., summer 1966)
- Bill Henderson, When My Dreamboat Comes Home (Joyce Collins(p), Dave Mackay(ep), Steve LaSpina(b), Jerry Coleman (d), Verve, 1965)
- Hank Bagby Soultet, Opus One (Hank Bagby Soultet(sax), Chuck Foster (Trumpet), Chiz Harris (drums), Al Hines(Bass), Dave Mackay(at piano), Protone Music, 1964)
- Kai Winding Septet, Ohio Penitentiary Show (Kai Winding(tb), Larry Boyle (tb), Chip Hoehler (tb), Jack Gale (btb), Dave Mackay(p), Jim Stevenson(b), Bobby Pike(dm), Private Recording, September 6, 1961)
- Lenox School of Jazz Concert (Featuring Ornette Coleman alto sax, Don Cherry trumpet, Kenny Dorham trumpet, Dave Mackay piano, Berkshire Music Barn, Lenox, Mass, Aug., 29th, 1959)

With Don Ellis

- Don Ellis Orchestra 'Live' at Monterey! (Pacific Jazz, 1966)
- Live in 3 2/3/4 Time (Pacific Jazz, 1966)
- Pieces of Eight: Live at UCLA (Wounded Bird, 1967 [2006])

== TV appearances ==
- Ad Lib
