= Malo (band) =

American musical group

- Origin: San Francisco, California, United States
- Genres: Chicano rock, Latin, blues, jazz rock
- Years active: 1971–1974, 1981–present
- Label: Warner Bros.

Malo (English: "Bad") is an American musical group known for its blend of Latino, rock, jazz and blues. The San Francisco-based ensemble was led by Arcelio Garcia, and Jorge Santana, the brother of Latin-rock guitarist Carlos Santana.

Two of Malo's original members Arcelio Garcia, and Pablo Tellez had previously played in the band The Malibus.

The other three members (Abel Zarate, Roy Murray, and Richard Spremich) had played together in the group Naked Lunch. Abel Zarate had previously played in a band called the Righteous Ones, and with Roy Murray in another band founded by Zarate called Banda De Jesus (Named after Zarate's mother, Corazon’s maiden name, De Jesus) along with longtime and current Bonnie Raitt bassist James "Hutch" Hutchinson and which was also produced by David Rubinson and Fred Catero though the tracks were never formally released.

== History ==
The band featured full horn and percussion sections in the style of contemporary bands Blood, Sweat & Tears and Chicago. Some of the best musicians in the Bay Area were featured in Malo, including Luis Gasca, Forrest Buchtel, Jr., Ron Smith, and Tom Poole in the trumpet section. Malo's music was popular in Central and South America, especially the songs "Chevere", "Nena", "Pana", "Cafe", and "Oye Mama".

After the release of their first album, many of Malo's original band members left the group in a rift widely publicized in the media. Buchtel went on to play with Blood, Sweat & Tears, Jaco Pastorius and Woody Herman. Abel Zarate went on to play with Willie Bobo and continues to play Latin/Brazilian Global jazz in San Francisco with his group Zarate Pollace Project. Richard Bean formed the group SAPO and later collaborated with Jorge Santana to write “Love The Way.” Arcelio Garcia died in 2020.

Malo's January 1972 hit single, "Suavecito" (meaning "soft" or "smooth" in Spanish), was the group's only song that charted on Billboard's Top 20, at #18 for 10 weeks. Lyrics were written by singer Richard Bean, guitarist Abel Zarate, and Pablo Tellez. Abel Zarate wrote and co-wrote many of the album's other songs.

A vocal section of "Suavecito" was included in the refrain of Sugar Ray's 1999 hit song, "Every Morning", which was one of Sugar Ray's most successful singles, climbing to number one on the US Billboard Modern Rock Tracks chart and the Canadian RPM Top Singles chart, becoming the latter country's second-highest-selling single of 1999. The chorus of the song references "Suavecito". Mark McGrath, Sugar Ray's frontman, says, "We referenced 'Suavecito' because growing up in California, you know, that was just like the low rider anthem. Any car show or swap meet you'd ever go by, you'd always hear that [song] and that just stuck in your mind." He added, "We actually came up with that part, and it was very similar to Malo's part. We were sort of imitating it, and then we said, 'Let's just leave it, we're gonna change it later.' It really makes the song – we think – so we just left it."

From 1994 to 1997, Malo was joined by new singer Martin Cantu. In 1995, Malo released Señorita on GNP Crescendo Records. The title track of the CD was co-written by Damon Bartlett and Martin Cantu, who, like previous band members, also grew up in San Francisco's Mission District. Martin went on to write the first single, "Take My Breath.” Martin co-wrote and performed on two of Malo's CD's Senorita and Malo Rocks The Rockies. In 1997, Martin transitioned to the Gospel music scene, releasing four Latin-Pop Gospel albums with his band L-Rey and is currently writing a book titled "From Malo to Ministry." Martin made a notable appearance in Woody Allen's 2013 film "Blue Jasmine" and in 2012 he and his son Martin Jr. contributed original music to the film "Sin Padre" In 2009 He acted in the film "La Mission" starring Benjamin Bratt and in (1998) he scored three songs for the film "Follow Me Home" Martin has been a dedicated husband to his wife Lani for 35 years and together have five children. Martin now pastors Praise Worship Center in Hercules, CA and in 2025 he received an honorary Doctorate in the field of Art and Music.

== Discography ==
=== Albums ===
Year	Album	US Top 200	US R&B
1972	Malo	14	10
1972	Dos	62	13
1973	Evolution	101	39
1974	Ascención	188	-
1981	Malo V	-	-
1986	Coast to Coast	-	-
1992	The Best of Malo	-	-
1995	Señorita	-	-
1998	Malo Rocks the Rockies	-	-
2005	Malo En Vivo	-	-

=== Singles ===
Date	Name	US Hot 100	US Billboard AC	Canada
1972	"Suavecito"	18	8	14
1972	"Café"	101	-	-
1972	"Latin Bugaloo"	108	-	-
1972	"I'm for Real"	-	-	-
1973	"I Don't Know"	-	-	-
1974	"Love Will Survive"	-	-	-
1981	"Lady I Love"	-	-	-
2004	"Dilo Otra Vez"	-	-	-
