= Jorge Santana =

Mexican guitarist (1951–2020)

Background information
- Born: Guillermo Santana; June 13, 1951; Autlán de Navarro, Jalisco, Mexico
- Origin: San Francisco, California, United States
- Died: May 14, 2020 (aged 68)
- Genres: Latin rock; blues rock
- Occupations: Musician; songwriter
- Instrument: Guitar
- Labels: Warner Bros.; Tomato; Polydor; Guts and Grace
- Website: jorgesantana.com

Guillermo "Jorge" Santana (13 June 1951 – 14 May 2020) was a Mexican guitarist, brother of musician Carlos Santana.

== Early life ==
Jorge was born Guillermo Santana on 13 June 1951 in Autlán, in Jalisco, Mexico. His parents were Josefina and Jose Santana. A younger brother of Carlos Santana, Jorge started playing guitar in San Francisco when he was a teen.

== Early career ==
At a young age Santana was in San Francisco based combo "Sounds Unlimited Blues Band" with Tom Lazaneo, Jim Dotson, Fred Pratt and Robert Lazaneo, formed in 1967 and finally calling it quits circa summer 1970, then joined a rhythm and blues band called "The Malibus" which later became just "Malo."

== Later career ==
He was a member of the San Francisco-based, Latin-rock band Malo, who had a top twenty hit in the U.S. Billboard Hot 100 with "Suavecito" in 1972. He released two solo albums on Tomato Records, Jorge Santana and It's All About Love, featuring former Malo members. In the mid-1970s he played with the Fania All-Stars. The band, Malo, which means "bad" in Spanish, played a combination of laid-back fusion of jazz, rock and a variety of forms of Latin music, similar to the sound of Carlos Santana, his brother. The band's debut album, called Malo was released in 1972 and included the song "Suavecito". The song, which had a smooth, melodic sound, made it to No.18 on the Billboard singles chart, and became a popular song for fans of Latin rock. Malo played together for four years and produced four albums until they broke up and Santana embarked on a solo career and played with the New York-based band the Fania All-Stars.

His distinctive guitar was a green Fender Stratocaster, acquired in the 1970s.

After a long split, Santana toured with his brother, Carlos. The album Sacred Fire: Live in South America was recorded in Mexico City on this tour, featuring Jorge Santana, who played a personalized orange Paul Reed Smith guitar.

In 1994 he recorded an album with his brother and Carlos Santana's nephew, Carlos Hernandez, called Santana Brothers.

One of his last musical contributions and performances was to provide songs with Abel Sanchez for the 2023 PBS "American Masters" (S37 E8) documentary series film A Song For Cesar on the life and work of farm labor unionist Cesar Chavez.

== Sound ==
According to WBGO radio host, musician and band leader Bobby Sanabria Jorge Santana's sound with Malo can be summed up thus:

"Picture Blood Sweat & Tears fused with Chicago, fused with Afro-Cuban rhythms and guitar driven rock. It was Santana on steroids."

== Personal life ==
He died in San Rafael, California of natural causes on 14 May 2020, aged 68. He was survived by his brother Carlos and another brother, Antonio. He also had four sisters: Lety Santana, Laura Porras, Irma Santana, and Maria Vrionis. He was married to Donna with whom he had a son, Anthony and a daughter, Michelle. He also had one grandson.

== Discography ==
- Jorge Santana (1978)
- It's All About Love (1979)
- Santana Brothers (1994)
- Here I Am (2009)
- Gracias Madrecita (2011)
- Restoration (2020)

=== Malo ===
- Malo (1972)
- Dos (1972)
- Evolution (1973)
- Ascension (1974)

=== Santana ===
- Sacred Fire: Live in South America (1993)

=== Fania All-Stars ===
- Latin-Soul-Rock (1974)
