= Natalie Cole discography =

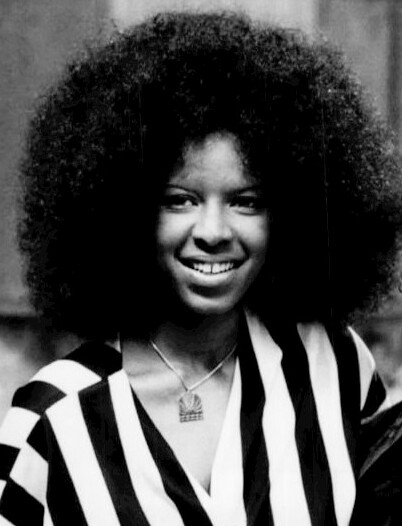
Cole in 1975

This is the discography documenting albums and singles released by American R&B/soul singer Natalie Cole.

== Albums ==
=== Studio albums ===
Title	Album details	Peak chart positions										Sales	Certifications
Title	Album details	US	US R&B	US Jazz	AUS	CAN	GER	NLD	NZ	SWI	UK	Sales	Certifications
Inseparable	Released: May 11, 1975; Label: Capitol	18	1	—	31	55	—	—	—	—	—		RIAA: Gold
Natalie	Released: April 9, 1976; Label: Capitol	13	3	—	82	7	—	—	23	—	—		RIAA: Gold
Unpredictable	Released: February 22, 1977; Label: Capitol	8	1	—	—	17	—	—	—	—	—		RIAA: Platinum
Thankful	Released: November 16, 1977; Label: Capitol	16	5	—	—	13	—	—	—	—	—		RIAA: Platinum
I Love You So	Released: March 19, 1979; Label: Capitol	52	11	—	—	62	—	—	—	—	—		RIAA: Gold
We're the Best of Friends (with Peabo Bryson)	Released: November 2, 1979; Label: Capitol	44	7	—	—	—	—	—	—	—	—		
Don't Look Back	Released: May 15, 1980; Label: Capitol	77	17	—	—	—	—	—	—	—	—		
Happy Love	Released: July 18, 1981; Label: Capitol	132	37	—	—	—	—	—	—	—	—		
I'm Ready	Released: August 12, 1983; Label: Epic	182	54	—	—	—	—	—	—	—	—		
Dangerous	Released: May 13, 1985; Label: Modern	140	48	—	—	—	—	—	—	—	—		
Everlasting	Released: June 19, 1987; Label: Manhattan, Elektra (1991 Re-release)	42	8	—	68	48	—	—	9	—	62		RIAA: Gold; BPI: Silver; RMNZ: Gold
Good to Be Back	Released: May 2, 1989; Label: EMI-USA, Elektra (1991 Re-release)	59	21	—	87	84	57	93	—	—	10		BPI: Gold
Unforgettable... with Love	Released: June 11, 1991; Label: Elektra	1	5	1	1	1	32	19	1	15	11	US: 6,200,000	RIAA: 7× Platinum; ARIA: 5× Platinum; BPI: Gold; IFPI SWI: Gold; MC: 4× Platinum; NVPI: Gold; RMNZ: Platinum
Take a Look	Released: June 9, 1993; Label: Elektra	26	14	1	50	29	90	—	36	—	16	US: 487,000	RIAA: Gold; BVMI: Gold; MC: Gold
Holly & Ivy	Released: October 25, 1994; Label: Elektra	36	20	—	127	—	—	—	—	—	—		RIAA: Gold
Stardust	Released: September 24, 1996; Label: Elektra	20	11	—	33	—	—	—	12	—	—		RIAA: Platinum
Snowfall on the Sahara	Released: June 22, 1999; Label: Elektra	163	64	—	—	—	—	—	—	—	—		
The Magic of Christmas (with the London Symphony Orchestra)	Released: October 19, 1999; Label: Elektra	157	84	—	—	—	—	—	—	—	—		
Ask a Woman Who Knows	Released: September 17, 2002; Label: Verve	32	24	1	--	—	67	—	44	52	63	US: 252,000	BPI: Silver
Leavin'	Released: September 26, 2006; Label: Verve	97	16	—	—	—	92	—	—	76	—	US: 57,000	
Still Unforgettable	Released: September 9, 2008; Label: DMI, Atco	19	8	1	—	—	—	—	—	—	59	US: 130,000	
Caroling, Caroling: Christmas with Natalie Cole	Released: October 7, 2008; Label: Elektra, Rhino	—	—	9	—	—	—	—	—	—	—		
Natalie Cole en Español	Released: June 25, 2013; Label: Verve	91	—	-	162	—	—	—	—	—	—		
"—" denotes a recording that did not chart or was not released in that territory.

=== Live albums ===
Title	Album details	Peak chart positions					Sales	Certifications
Title	Album details	US	US R&B	CAN	FRA	GER	Sales	Certifications
Natalie Live!	Released: June 13, 1978; Label: Capitol	31	9	38	—	—		RIAA: Gold
A Celebration of Christmas (with José Carreras & Plácido Domingo)	Released: October 29, 1996; Label: Erato	196	—	—	47	37		
The Most Wonderful Time of the Year (with Mormon Tabernacle Choir)	Released: September 7, 2010; Label: Mormon Tabernacle / Intellectual Reserve	185	31	—	—	—	US: 37,000	
"—" denotes a recording that did not chart or was not released in that territory.

=== Compilation albums ===
Title	Album details	Peak chart positions				
Title	Album details	US	US R&B	FIN	GER	SWI
The Natalie Cole Collection	Released: 1982 (1987 re-release); Label: Capitol	—	—	—	—	—
Twin Best Now	Released: September 30, 1992; Label: Capitol / Toshiba-EMI; Japanese release only	—	—	—	—	—
I've Got Love on My Mind	Released: October 16, 1995; Label: EMI-Capitol Special Markets	—	—	—	—	—
This Will Be: Natalie Cole's Everlasting Love	Released: June 3, 1997; Label: Capitol	—	—	—	—	—
Super Best	Released: January 28, 1998; Label: Capitol / Toshiba-EMI; Japanese release only	—	—	—	—	—
Greatest Hits, Vol. 1	Released: November 7, 2000; Label: Elektra	154	86	—	—	—
Love Songs	Released: January 29, 2001; Label: Elektra / WSM	—	—	25	11	79
The Best of Natalie Cole	Released: March 13, 2001; Label: EMI-Capitol Special Markets	—	—	—	—	—
Anthology	Released: March 27, 2003; Label: The Right Stuff	—	—	—	—	—
Original Album Series	Released: May 1, 2010; Label: Elektra / Rhino UK	—	—	—	—	—
"—" denotes a recording that did not chart or was not released in that territory.

== Singles ==
Title	Year	Peak chart positions										Certifications	Album
Title	Year	US	US R&B	US A/C	US Dan	AUS	CAN	GER	NLD	NZ	UK	Certifications	Album
"This Will Be"	1975	6	1	45	5	28	12	—	18	—	32	BPI: Platinum	Inseparable
"Inseparable"	1975	32	1	20	—	—	49	—	—	—	—		Inseparable
"Sophisticated Lady (She's a Different Lady)"	1976	25	1	—	—	—	55	—	—	4	—		Natalie
"Mr. Melody"	1976	49	10	25	—	—	56	—	—	—	—		Natalie
"I've Got Love on My Mind"	1977	5	1	45	—	—	5	—	—	22	—	RIAA: Gold	Unpredictable
"Party Lights"	1977	79	9	—	—	—	—	—	—	—	53 (Note: Chart position is from the official UK "Breakers List".)		Unpredictable
"Our Love"	1977	10	1	33	—	—	11	—	—	—	—	RIAA: Gold	Thankful
"Annie Mae"	1978	—	6	—	—	—	—	—	—	—	—		Thankful
"Lucy in the Sky with Diamonds"	1978	—	53	—	—	—	—	—	—	—	—		Natalie Live!
"Stand By"	1979	— (Note: "Stand By" did not enter the Hot 100, but peaked at number 8 on the Bubbling Under Hot 100 Singles.)	9	—	—	—	—	—	—	—	—		I Love You So
"Sorry"	1979	— (Note: "Sorry" did not enter the Hot 100, but peaked at number 9 on the Bubbling Under Hot 100 Singles.)	34	—	—	—	—	—	—	—	—		I Love You So
"Your Lonely Heart"	1979	—	59	—	—	—	—	—	—	—	—		I Love You So
"Gimme Some Time" (with Peabo Bryson)	1979	— (Note: "Gimme Some Time" did not enter the Hot 100, but peaked at number 2 on the Bubbling Under Hot 100 Singles.)	8	—	—	—	—	—	—	—	—		We're the Best of Friends
"What You Won't Do for Love" (with Peabo Bryson)	1980	—	16	—	—	—	—	—	—	—	—		We're the Best of Friends
"Someone That I Used to Love"	1980	21	21	3	—	-	—	—	—	—	—		Don't Look Back
"Hold On"	1980	—	38	—	—	—	—	—	—	—	—		Don't Look Back
"You Were Right Girl"	1981	—	35	—	—	—	—	—	—	—	—		Happy Love
"Nothin' But a Fool"	1981	—	34	—	—	—	—	—	—	—	—		Happy Love
"Too Much Mister"	1983	—	45	—	—	—	—	—	—	—	—		I'm Ready
"Dangerous"	1985	57	16	—	6	—	—	—	—	—	—		Dangerous
"A Little Bit of Heaven"	1985	81	28	11	—	—	—	—	—	—	—		Dangerous
"Secrets"	1985	—	—	—	36	—	—	—	—	—	—		Dangerous
"Jump Start"	1987	13	2	—	28	—	53	—	—	20	44		Everlasting
"I Live for Your Love"	1987	13	4	2	—	—	50	—	—	—	86		Everlasting
"Over You" (with Ray Parker Jr.)	1987	—	10	38	—	—	—	—	—	—	65		After Dark
"Pink Cadillac"	1988	5	9	16	1	6	4	5	26	4	5	MC: Gold	Everlasting
"When I Fall in Love"	1988	95	31	14	—	—	24	—	—	—	—		Everlasting
"Everlasting"	1988	—	—	—	—	—	—	38	—	20	28		Everlasting
"Jump Start" (re-release)	1988	—	—	—	—	—	—	—	—	—	36		Everlasting
"I Live for Your Love" (re-release)	1988	—	—	—	—	—	—	—	—	—	23		Everlasting
"Miss You Like Crazy"	1989	7	1	1	—	34	19	22	13	40	2	BPI: Gold	Good to Be Back
"I Do" (with Freddie Jackson)	1989	—	7	15	—	—	—	—	—	—	—		Good to Be Back
"The Rest of the Night"	1989	—	—	—	—	—	—	—	—	—	56		Good to Be Back
"As a Matter of Fact"	1989	—	52	—	—	162	—	—	—	—	—		Good to Be Back
"Starting Over Again"	1990	—	—	5	—	—	—	—	—	—	56		Good to Be Back
"Wild Women Do"	1990	34	—	—	8	37	—	—	—	35	16		Pretty Woman: Original Motion Picture Soundtrack
"Unforgettable" (with Nat King Cole)	1991	14	10	3	—	2	15	78	15	7	19	RIAA: Gold; ARIA: Gold	Unforgettable... with Love
"The Christmas Song"	1991	—	—	22	—	104	—	—	—	45	—		Non-album single
"The Very Thought of You"	1992	—	—	34	—	—	—	—	—	—	71		Unforgettable... with Love
"Take a Look"	1993	—	68	35	140	—	—	—	—	—	—		Take a Look
"When I Fall In Love" (with Nat King Cole)	1996	—	—	—	—	61	—	—	—	—	—		Stardust
"A Smile Like Yours"	1997	84	—	8	—	—	—	—	—	—	—		A Smile Like Yours: Music from the Original Motion Picture Soundtrack
"The Christmas Song" (re-release)	1998	— (Note: "The Christmas Song" did not enter the Hot 100, but peaked at number 24 on the Bubbling Under Hot 100 Singles.)	—	—	—	—	—	—	—	—	—		Non-album single
"Snowfall on the Sahara"	1999	—	—	25	—	—	—	—	—	—	—		Snowfall on the Sahara
"Say You Love Me"	1999	—	82	—	—	—	—	—	—	—	—		Snowfall on the Sahara
"Angel on My Shoulder"	2000	—	—	14	—	—	—	—	—	—	—		Greatest Hits, Vol. 1
"Livin' for Love"	2000	—	—	—	1	—	—	96	—	—	—		Greatest Hits, Vol. 1
"Day Dreaming"	2006	—	77	29	—	—	—	—	—	—	—		Leavin'
"—" denotes a recording that did not chart or was not released in that territory.

== Other appearances ==
Year	Song	Album
1994	"Unforgettable" (live version with Nat "King" Cole video)	Grammy's Greatest Moments Volume I
2004	"Fever" (with Ray Charles)	Genius Loves Company
