= The Natalie Cole Collection =

Compilation album by Natalie Cole
- Released: January 20, 1982 (Original); August, 1987 (Additional tracks)
- Recorded: 1975–80
- Genre: Soul
- Label: Capitol
- Producer: Chuck Jackson; Marvin Yancy

Natalie Cole chronology
| Happy Love (1981) | The Natalie Cole Collection (1982) | I'm Ready (1983) |

The Natalie Cole Collection is a compilation album from American singer Natalie Cole from her previous tenure with Capitol Records. The original album was released on January 20, 1982, just after she left the label, and featured ten songs spanning from Inseparable (1975) to I Love You So (1979). It was later re–released in August 1987 to coincide with the new–found success she had with Everlasting, and included five additional songs from her final two albums for Capitol (Don't Look Back and Happy Love) and her duet album with Peabo Bryson. It is her most popular compilation and is still in print.

== Track listing ==
Original 1982 release

1. "I've Got Love on My Mind" (from Unpredictable)
2. "This Will Be (An Everlasting Love)" (from Inseparable)
3. "Our Love" (from Thankful)
4. "I Can't Say No" (from Inseparable)
5. "Sophisticated Lady (She's a Different Lady)" (from Natalie)
6. "Inseparable" (from Inseparable)
7. "I'm Catching Hell (Living Here Alone)" (from Unpredictable)
8. "Party Lights" (from Unpredictable)
9. "Mr. Melody" (from Natalie)
10. "Stand By" (from I Love You So)

Additional tracks on 1987 re-release

11. "Gimme Some Time" (with Peabo Bryson) (from We're the Best of Friends)
12. "Someone That I Used To Love" (from Don't Look Back)
13. "Nothing But A Fool" (from Happy Love)
14. "You Were Right Girl" (from Happy Love)
15. "Your Lonely Heart" (from I Love You So)
