= Natalie Live! =

Live album by Natalie Cole
- Released: June 13, 1978
- Recorded: August 1977, March, 1978
- Venue: Universal Amphitheatre (Los Angeles, California); Latin Casino (Cherry Hill, New Jersey)
- Genre: R&B; soul
- Label: Capitol
- Producer: Chuck Jackson; Marvin Yancy; Gene Barge

Natalie Cole chronology
Thankful (1977)	Natalie Live! (1978)	I Love You So (1979)

Professional ratings
Review scores
Source	Rating
AllMusic	4.5/5 stars
BBC	(favorable)

Natalie Live is a 1978 live album by American singer Natalie Cole. Released on June 13, 1978, this double-length live album was recorded at two different locations: In August 1977 at the Universal Amphitheatre in Los Angeles, California, and in March 1978 at the Latin Casino in Cherry Hill, New Jersey.

== Track listing ==
All tracks are written by Chuck Jackson and Marvin Yancy, except where noted.

Side one
No.	Title	Writer(s)	Length
1.	"Sophisticated Lady (She's a Different Lady)"	Jackson, Yancy, Natalie Cole	3:35
2.	"Que Sera, Sera"	Jay Livingston, Ray Evans	7:36
3.	"Lovers"	Jackson, Yancy, Cole	3:10
4.	"I'm Catching Hell (Living Here Alone)"		7:28

Side two
No.	Title	Writer(s)	Length
5.	"Mr. Melody"		3:33
6.	"This Will Be (An Everlasting Love)"		3:16
7.	"Party Lights"	Tennyson Stephens	4:58
8.	"I've Got Love on My Mind"		7:52

Side three
No.	Title	Writer(s)	Length
9.	"Lucy in the Sky with Diamonds"	John Lennon, Paul McCartney	8:06
10.	"Inseparable"		2:51
11.	"Cry Baby"	Bert Russell, Norman Meade	5:09
12.	"Can We Get Together Again"		4:00

Side four
No.	Title	Writer(s)	Length
13.	"I Can't Say No"		6:28
14.	"Something's Got a Hold on Me"	Pearl Woods, Etta James, Leroy Kirkland	4:32
15.	"Be Thankful"		7:32
16.	"Our Love"		7:08

== Personnel ==
- Natalie Cole – lead vocals
- Linda Williams, Michael Wycoff – keyboards at Universal Amphitheater
- Charles Bynum - guitar at Latin Casino
- Andrew Kastner – guitar at Universal Amphitheater
- Bobby Eaton – bass at Universal Amphitheater
- Teddy Sparks - drums at Universal Amphitheater
- Wayne Habersham - percussion at Universal Amphitheater
- Louis Palomo – percussion at Latin Casino
- Anita Anderson, Michael Wycoff, Sissy Peoples, Wayne Habersham – backing vocals
- Gene Barge, Richard Evans, Don Hannah – arrangements
- Jules Chaikin - orchestral contractor at Universal Amphitheater
- Louis Krause – orchestral contractor at Latin Casino
- Linda Williams – orchestral conductor

== Production ==
- Producers – Charles Jackson, Gene Barge and Marvin Yancy.
- Executive Producer – Larkin Arnold
- Engineers – Barney Perkins and Ray Thompson
- Mixed by Barney Perkins and Zollie Johnson at ABC Studios (Los Angeles, CA).
- Editing – Gene Barge, Charles Jackson, Zollie Johnson, Barney Perkins and Marvin Yancy.
- Mastered by Wally Traugott at Capitol Studios (Hollywood, CA).
- Design – Kathy Morphesis
- Design and Artwork – Roger Williams
- Liner Notes – David Nathan

== Charts ==
Chart (1978)	Peak positions
Canada Top Singles (RPM)	38
U.S. Billboard Top LPs	31
U.S. Billboard Top Soul LPs	9

Singles

Year	Single	Peak positions
Year	Single	US R&B
1978	"Lucy in the Sky with Diamonds"	53

== Certifications ==
Region	Certification	Certified units/sales
United States (RIAA)	Gold	1,000,000^{^}
^{^} Shipments figures based on certification alone.
