= Good to Be Back =

1989 studio album by Natalie Cole

Studio album by Natalie Cole
- Released: May 8, 1989
- Studios: Westlake Audio, Hitsville U.S.A., Steve Lindsey Studio, Jones Studios, Record Plant and A.E.M.P. (Los Angeles, California); Ocean Way Recording and Conway Studios (Hollywood, California); Larrabee Sound Studios and Devonshire Sound Studios (North Hollywood, California); O'Henry Sound Studios and Ground Control Studios (Burbank California); Can-Am Recorders (Tarzana, California); Aire L.A. Studios (Glendale, California); Tarpan Studios (San Rafael, California); Cove City Sound Studios (Long Island, New York); Shakedown Sound Studios (New York City, New York)
- Genre: R&B
- Length: 46:34
- Labels: EMI-USA (original release); Elektra (1990-1991 re–issue)
- Producers: Dennis Lambert; André Fischer; Michael Masser; Narada Michael Walden; Lee Curreri; Ric Wake For Wake Productions; Eddie Cole

Natalie Cole chronology
The Natalie Cole Collection (1987)	Good to Be Back (1989)	Unforgettable... with Love (1991)

Professional ratings
Review scores
Source	Rating
AllMusic	3/5 stars
Hi-Fi News & Record Review	A:1
Number One	2/5 stars
Record Mirror	3/5 stars
Stereo Review	(favorable)
New York Daily News	(favorable)
The Plain Dealer	(favorable)

Good to Be Back is the twelfth studio album by American singer Natalie Cole. Released in May 1989 by EMI USA, it contains the hit singles "Miss You Like Crazy" and "I Do".

== Reception ==
The first single "Miss You Like Crazy" peaked at number 7 on the US Billboard Hot 100 and topped the Adult Contemporary and Hot R&B Songs charts in 1989. It reached number 2 on the UK Singles Chart, becoming her biggest chart hit single there, and number 13 in the Netherlands. The single "I Do" with Freddie Jackson hit the top 10 on US R&B Songs and the top 20 on US Dance Songs chart. The album's third and fourth singles were "The Rest of the Night" (UK #56) and "Starting Over Again" (#5 on US Adult Contemporary and #56 in the UK).

== Track listing ==
No.	Title	Writer(s)	Producer(s)	Length
1.	"Safe"	Franne Golde; Dennis Lambert	Dennis Lambert	3:46
2.	"As a Matter of Fact"	Don Boyette; Siedah Garrett	André Fischer	3:57
3.	"The Rest of the Night"	Glen Ballard; Randy Goodrum	Lambert	4:33
4.	"Miss You Like Crazy"	Preston Glass; Gerry Goffin; Michael Masser	Masser	3:53
5.	"I Do" (duet with Freddie Jackson)	Frank Wildhorn	Narada Michael Walden	3:56
6.	"Good to Be Back"	Pam Reswick; Steve Werfel	Lambert	4:19
7.	"Gonna Make You Mine"	Garry Glenn	Fischer	4:34
8.	"Starting Over Again"	Gerry Goffin; Michael Masser	Masser	4:13
9.	"Don't Mention My Heartache"	Clydene Jackson; Catherine Wilmore	Lee Curreri	4:44
10.	"I Can't Cry"	Shelly Peiken	Ric Wake	4:17
11.	"Someone's Rockin' My Dreamboat"	Leon René; Otis René	Eddie Cole	4:05
Total length:				46:34

1990 UK & Europe reissue includes "Wild Women Do" (Power Mix with Rap) as Track 1 (12 tracks total) from the original motion picture soundtrack Pretty Woman. Written by Greg Prestopino, Sam Lorber and Matthew Wilder and produced by André Fischer.
The LP track length (4:18) and CD track length (4:29). The track was also noted to have been produced in 1990 rather than 1989 so this was probably a later issue of the album as the copyright notice was for 1990. The song is not listed on various 1991 USA reissues for this album in either Allmusic or Discogs listings, but had been released in various mixes on 7", 12" vinyl and CD singles in 1990.

== Personnel ==
Musicians

- Natalie Cole – vocals
- Claude Gaudette – keyboards (1, 3, 6), synthesizers (1, 3)
- Don Boyette – keyboards (2), synthesizers (2), bass (2)
- Roman Johnson – synthesizers (2, 7), keyboards (7)
- Steve Lindsey – synthesizer programming (2), sounds (2)
- Sam Ward – synthesizer programming (2, 7), sounds (2, 7)
- Robbie Buchanan – acoustic piano (4, 8), Fender Rhodes (4), Rhodes electric piano (8)
- Walter Afanasieff – keyboards (5), synthesizers (5), bass (5), drum programming (5)
- Ren Klyce – E-mu Emulator II (5), Fairlight CMI (5)
- Jeff Scott – Fender Rhodes (9), acoustic piano (9)
- Lee Curreri – keyboards (9), acoustic piano (9), synthesizer programming (9)
- Jeff Rona – synthesizer programming (9)
- John Philip Shenale – synthesizer programming (9)
- Booker T. Jones – Hammond B3 organ (9)
- Rich Tancredi – keyboards (10)
- Charles Floyd – acoustic piano (11), synthesizers (11)
- David Joyce – synthesizers (11)
- Teddy Castellucci – guitars (1)
- Paul Jackson Jr. – guitars (3, 4, 6, 8)
- Dean Parks – guitars (4)
- Michael Thompson – guitars (7)
- Bob Cadway – guitars (10)
- Neil Stubenhaus – bass (3, 6, 9)
- Paul Robinson – bass (4)
- Mike Porcaro – bass (8)
- Jimmy Johnson – bass (11)
- John Robinson – drums (3)
- Jeff Porcaro – drums (4, 7, 8), percussion (7)
- Joey Franco – drums (10)
- Ric Wake – drums (10)
- Armand Grimaldi – drums (11)
- André Fischer – brush overdubs (11)
- Luis Conte – percussion (1, 3, 6)
- Gigi Gonaway – cymbals (5)
- Paulinho da Costa – percussion (9)
- Eddie Cole – finger snaps (11)
- Tom Scott – alto saxophone (9)
- David Woodford – baritone saxophone (9)
- Jimmy Roberts – tenor saxophone (9)
- Garrett Adkins – trombone (9)
- Rick Braun – trumpet (9)

Music arrangements

- Claude Gaudette – arrangements (1, 3, 6)
- Natalie Cole – vocal arrangements (1, 3, 6)
- Dennis Lambert – vocal arrangements (1, 3, 6)
- Don Boyette – arrangements (2)
- André Fischer – arrangements (2)
- Robbie Buchanan – rhythm track arrangements (4, 8), string arrangements (8)
- Penny Ford – vocal arrangements (7)
- Michael Masser – rhythm arrangements (8), string arrangements (8)
- Lee Curreri – arrangements (9)
- Steve Skinner – arrangements (10)
- Rich Tancredi – arrangements (10)
- Ric Wake – arrangements (10)
- Eddie Cole – arrangements (11)
- David Joyce – arrangements (11)

Background vocalists

- Eddie Cole – backing vocals (1)
- Natalie Cole – backing vocals (1–3, 6, 7, 9)
- David Joyce – backing vocals (1)
- Katrina Perkins – backing vocals (1, 7)
- Sandra Simmons – backing vocals (1)
- Freddie Jackson – vocals (5)
- Jamillah Muhammad – backing vocals (10)
- Shelly Peiken – backing vocals (10)
- Billy T. Scott – backing vocals (10)

=== Production ===
- Dan Cleary – executive producer, management
- Natalie Cole – executive producer
- Dennis Lambert – producer (1, 3, 6)
- André Fischer – producer (2, 7)
- Don Boyette – associate producer (2)
- Michael Masser – producer (4, 8)
- Narada Michael Walden – producer (5)
- Roman Johnson – associate producer (7)
- Lee Curreri – producer (9)
- Ric Wake – producer (10)
- Eddie Cole – producer (11)
- Steve James – production coordinator (4, 8)
- Henry Marquez – art direction
- LuAnn Graffeo – design
- Matthew Rolston – photography
- Cecile Parker – stylist
- Tara Posey – make-up
- Janet Sims Zeitoun – hair

Technical credits

- Bernie Grundman – assembling and mastering at Bernie Grundman Mastering (Hollywood, California)
- Doug Rider – recording (1, 3, 6)
- Mick Guzauski – recording (2, 7), mixing (2, 7, 9, 11)
- Richard McKernan – recording (2, 7), assistant engineer (3, 6)
- André Fischer – mixing (2, 9, 11)
- Calvin Harris – recording (4, 8), mixing (4, 8)
- Russ Terrana – engineer (4)
- David Frazer – recording (5), mixing (5)
- John Carter – engineer (9)
- Jimmy Hoyson – engineer (9), assistant engineer (9)
- John Beverly Jones – engineer (9)
- Rick McCormick – engineer (9)
- Bob Cadway – recording (10), mixing (10)
- Craig Burbidge – engineer (11)
- Eddie Cole – mixing (11)
- Dave Bianco – additional recording (1, 3, 6)
- Brian Malouf – additional recording (1, 6), mixing (1, 3, 6)
- Gabe Veltri – additional recording (1, 3, 6)
- Claudio Ordenas – assistant engineer (3, 6)
- Jeff Poe – assistant engineer (3, 6)
- Toby Wright – assistant engineer (3, 6)
- Steve James – assistant engineer (4, 8)
- Dana Jon Chappelle – assistant engineer (5)
- Rick Butz – assistant engineer (7)
- Jim McCaan – assistant engineer (7)
- Marnie Riley – assistant engineer (7)
- Bill Dooley – assistant engineer (8)
- Mark Hagen – assistant engineer (8)
- Joe Schiff – assistant engineer (8)
- Paul Wertheimer – assistant engineer (8)
- Chris Fuhrman – assistant engineer (9)
- Craig Johnson – assistant engineer (9)

== Singles ==
- "Miss You Like Crazy" – Released: March 15, 1989
- "I Do" (duet with Freddie Jackson) – Released: June 10, 1989
- "The Rest of the Night" – Released: September 4, 1989
- "As A Matter Of Fact" – Released: October 30, 1989
- "Good to Be Back" – Released: November 26, 1989
- "Starting Over Again" – Released: January 1, 1990
- "Wild Women Do" (Power Mix with Rap) – Released: 1990

== Charts ==
Chart (1989)	Peak position
Australian Albums (ARIA)	87
UK Albums (Official Charts)	10
US Billboard 200	59
US Top R&B/Hip-Hop Albums (Billboard)	21

== Certifications ==
Region	Certification	Certified units/sales
United Kingdom (BPI)	Gold	100,000^{^}
^{^} Shipments figures based on certification alone.
