= Dangerous (Natalie Cole album) =

Studio album by Natalie Cole
- Released: May 15, 1985
- Recorded: 1984–85
- Studio: Music Grinder Studios, Soundcastle and Conway Studios (Hollywood, California); Devonshire Sound Studios, One On One Studios and Flores Productions (North Hollywood, California); Master Control Studios (Burbank, California); Can-Am Recorders and Redwing Studios (Tarzana, California); Yamaha Recording Studios (Glendale, California); Studio Masters (Los Angeles, California); Mediasound Studios (New York City, New York)
- Genre: R&B; soul; dance-rock
- Length: 54:35
- Label: Modern/Atco
- Producer: Gary Skardina; Marti Sharron; Harold Beatty; Eddie Cole; Natalie Cole

Natalie Cole chronology
I'm Ready (1983)	Dangerous (1985)	Everlasting (1987)

Professional ratings
Review scores
Source	Rating
AllMusic	2/5 stars

Dangerous is a 1985 album by American singer Natalie Cole released on May 15, 1985, through the Atco Records-distributed Modern Records label. The album reached peak positions of number 140 on the Billboard 200 and number 48 on Billboard's R&B Albums chart.

== Reception ==
The album reached peak positions at number 140 on the Billboard 200 and number 48 on Billboard‘s R&B Albums chart. The lead single "Dangerous" was a modest hit and peak top 20 on US R&B Songs and a top 10 chart hit on the US Dance Songs chart. "A Little Bit of Heaven" hit the top 10 on US Adult Songs and only reached number 81 on the Billboard Hot 100, it was used as a recurring love theme for Eden Capwell and Cruz Castillo on the television soap opera Santa Barbara.

== Track listing ==
No.	Title	Writer(s)	Producer(s)	Length
1.	"Dangerous"	Marti Sharron; Stephen Mitchell; Gary Skardina	Sharron; Skardina	3:49
2.	"Billy the Kid Next Door"	Edward Holland, Jr.; Harold Beatty	Beatty	4:40
3.	"Secrets"	Dianne Steinberg; Sharron	Sharron; Skardina	4:13
4.	"Nobody's Soldier"	David Lasley; Willie Wilcox	Sharron; Skardina	4:04
5.	"Opposites Attract"	Holland; Beatty; R. David; R. Holland	Beatty	3:43
6.	"A Little Bit of Heaven"	Graham Lyle; Richard Kerr	Sharron; Skardina	4:03
7.	"Your Car (My Garage)"	Holland; Beatty	Beatty	4:05
8.	"Love is On the Way"	Eddie Cole; Natalie Cole	E. Cole; N. Cole	4:51
9.	"The Gift"	Mark Davis; Sharron	Sharron; Skardina	3:12
Total length:				54:35

== Personnel ==
Musicians

- Natalie Cole – lead vocals
- Paul Fox – synthesizers (1)
- Charles Judge – synthesizers (1), synthesizer programming (3), bass programming (3), drum programming (3), arrangements (3)
- Rory Kaplan – synthesizers (1)
- Jamie Sheriff – synthesizers (1, 4)
- Stephen Mitchell – synthesizers (1), synthesizer programming (1), drum machine (1), arrangements (1)
- Greg Wright – synthesizers (2, 5, 7), arrangements (2, 5, 7)
- Michael Rochelle – synthesizer programming (2)
- Greg Phillinganes – additional synthesizers (3)
- Randy Kerber – keyboards (4, 6), acoustic piano (4), rhythm keyboards (9)
- Robbie Buchanan – additional synthesizers (4, 6, 9)
- David Joyce – keyboards (8)
- Michael Boyd – guitars (1)
- Paul Jackson Jr. – rhythm guitar (1), guitars (8)
- Josh Sklair – rhythm guitar (2), guitar solo (2), guitars (5, 7)
- Sheldon Sondheim – additional rhythm guitar (2)
- Roland Bautista – rhythm guitar (3), synth guitar (3)
- Dean Parks – guitars (4, 6), rhythm guitar (9)
- Nathan East – bass (1, 4, 6)
- Keith Nelson – bass (5)
- Freddie Washington – bass (8, 9)
- Craig Burbidge – drum programming (2)
- Larry Talbert – drum programming (2)
- John Robinson – drums (4, 6, 9)
- Robert Jacobs – Simmons drums (7)
- Bill Boydstun – Linn 9000 programming (8)
- Robert Shipley – drum overdubs (8)
- Paulinho da Costa – percussion (1, 3, 4, 6, 9)
- Gary Skardina – tambourine (1), arrangements (1, 4, 9)
- Steve Forman – additional percussion (3)
- Ron Brown – saxophones (5)
- David Majal Li – saxophones (5)
- Eddie Cole – saxophone solo (7), arrangements (8)
- Fred Wesley – trombone (5)
- Jerry Hey – flugelhorn solo (4)
- Ray Brown – trumpet (5)
- Nolan Smith – trumpet (5)
- Marti Sharron – arrangements (1, 4, 9), BGV arrangements (1, 3, 4)
- Gene Page – arrangements (4, 6, 8), string arrangements (4, 9), rhythm arrangements (9)

Background vocalists

- Alex Brown – backing vocals (1, 3, 4), BGV arrangements (1, 3, 4)
- Portia Griffin – backing vocals (1, 3, 4), BGV arrangements (1, 3, 4)
- Van Ross Redding – backing vocals (1, 3, 4), BGV arrangements (1, 3, 4)
- Natalie Cole – backing vocals (2, 4, 5, 8), vocal arrangements (2, 5, 7), all vocals (7)
- Eddie Cole – backing vocals (4, 5, 8)
- David Joyce – backing vocals (8)
- Yasmin "Sissy" Peoples – backing vocals (8)
- Katrina Perkins – backing vocals (8)

Production

- Paul E. Fishkin – executive producer
- Marti Sharron – producer (1, 3, 4, 6, 9)
- Gary Skardina – producer (1, 3, 4, 6, 9)
- Steve Thompson – additional production (1, 5)
- Harold Beatty – producer (2, 5, 7)
- Eddie Cole – producer (8)
- Natalie Cole – producer (8), liner notes
- Karin Patterson – production coordinator (2, 5, 7)
- Aaron Rapoport – photography
- Keith Hodges – clothes
- Adrian Houghton – hair stylist
- Jeff Angel – make-up
- Dan Cleary – management

Technical credits

- Stephen Marcussen – mastering at Precision Lacquer (Hollywood, California)
- Gary Skardina – engineer (1, 3, 4, 6, 9), mixing (6, 9)
- Bill Bottrell – mixing (1)
- Michael Barbiero – mixing (1, 5)
- Steve Thompson – mixing (1, 5)
- Craig Burbidge – recording (2, 5)
- Taavi Mote – mixing (2, 5)
- Mick Guzauski – mixing (3, 4)
- Michael Mancini – string engineer (4)
- Mark Wolfson – recording (8), mixing (8), string engineer (9)
- Jon Ingoldsby – additional engineer (1, 3, 4, 6), assistant engineer (9)
- Casey McMackin – additional engineer (1, 3, 4, 6), assistant engineer (9)
- Robert Feist – additional engineer (3, 4), assistant engineer (9)
- Stan Katayama – assistant engineer (2)
- Peggy McAffee – assistant engineer (2), mix assistant (8)
- Daren Klein – assistant mix engineer (3, 4)
- Kirk Butler – recording assistant (8)
- Peter Lewis – recording assistant (8), string engineer (9)
- Steve Hug – recording assistant (8)
- Greg Penny – assistant engineer (9)

== Charts ==
Chart (1985)	Peak position
US Billboard 200	140
US Top R&B/Hip-Hop Albums (Billboard)	48
