= Ask a Woman Who Knows =

Studio album by Natalie Cole
- Released: September 17, 2002
- Recorded: 2002
- Studio: Avatar (New York, New York); Capitol (Hollywood, California); Bill Schnee Studios (North Hollywood, California)
- Genre: Jazz
- Length: 53:31
- Label: Verve
- Producer: Tommy LiPuma; Natalie Cole (exec.)

Natalie Cole chronology
Snowfall on the Sahara (1999)	Ask a Woman Who Knows (2002)	Leavin' (2003)

Professional ratings
Review scores
Source	Rating
AllMusic	4/5 stars
Vibe	3/5 stars

Ask a Woman Who Knows is a 2002 jazz album by vocalist Natalie Cole with guest Diana Krall. It received four Grammy Award nominations.

== Background ==
Courtesy of the Clayton-Hamilton Orchestra, Cole projects her aura onto songs once recorded previously by great singers like Nina Simone, Sarah Vaughan, Ella Fitzgerald, Dinah Washington, Peggy Lee, Carmen McRae, Barbra Streisand, Diana Ross, Frank Sinatra, and Nat "King" Cole. Natalie Cole's musical choices include songs that depict the various aspects of love—its joy, its sorrow, its loneliness, and its consolation. Included are two of Dinah Washington's gems -- "I Haven't Got Anything Better to Do" and the title track, "Ask a Woman Who Knows"—both songs about love gone wrong. Cole changes the tone of the set with great scatting on the up-tempo swinger "My Baby Just Cares for Me"; big band swing "It's Crazy," the hit by her father, Nat King Cole; and the soulful "I'm Glad There Is You," which features Roy Hargrove on flugelhorn. Natalie Cole sings her engaging musical stories with priceless, nuanced phrasing accompanied by a distinguished core quintet of Joe Sample, Russell Malone, Christian McBride, Lewis Nash, and Rob Mounsey. The added dimension of Natalie Cole performing all background vocals and the backing of the Clayton-Hamilton Orchestra on two songs makes the recording extra special. Overall, this is an exceptional recording that re-teams her with Tommy LiPuma, the producer of her biggest hit, Unforgettable: With Love. "Better Than Anything" is a jazz waltz devoted to "women shopping, guest vocal Diana Krall in perfect agreement that spending money is the best thing in life ("better than honey on bread, better than breakfast in bed" —lyrics by Bill Loughborough), better than anything except being in love. "I'm Glad There Is You," Latin-influenced ballad from 1941 by Jimmy Dorsey. "Calling You" is an Academy Award-nominated song from the Bagdad Café (1987) film. "My Baby Just Cares For Me," the only standard here whose title is immediately recognizable, introduced in 1928 by singer Eddie Cantor, best known as the signature tune of singer and pianist Nina Simone.

== Commercial performance ==
Ask a Woman Who Knows debuted at No. 1 on Billboard's Top Jazz Albums chart and has sold more than 252,000 copies in the United States, according to Nielsen SoundScan.

== Track listing ==
No.	Title	Writer(s)	Length
1.	"I Haven't Got Anything Better To Do"	Lee Pockriss; Paul Vance	4:07
2.	"Tell Me All About It"	Michael Franks	4:10
3.	"Ask a Woman Who Knows"	Victor Abrams	4:14
4.	"It's Crazy"	Al Fields; Timmie Rogers	2:10
5.	"You're Mine, You"	Johnny Green; Edward Heyman	4:03
6.	"So Many Stars"	Sérgio Mendes; Alan Bergman; Marilyn Bergman	5:16
7.	"I Told You So"	Duncan Lamont	3:52
8.	"Soon"	George Gershwin; Ira Gershwin	3:13
9.	"I'm Glad There Is You"	Jimmy Dorsey; Paul Madeira	5:16
10.	"Better Than Anything" (Duet with Diana Krall)	David Wheat; Bill Loughborough	3:35
11.	"The Music That Makes Me Dance"	Jule Styne; Bob Merrill	4:09
12.	"Calling You"	Robert Telson	5:00
13.	"My Baby Just Cares for Me"	Walter Donaldson; Gus Kahn	4:26
Total length:			53:31

== Personnel ==
Credits adapted from the liner notes of Ask a Woman Who Knows.

Musicians and vocalists

- Natalie Cole – vocals
- Rob Mounsey – keyboards (1–4, 6–13)
- Joe Sample – acoustic piano (1–4, 7, 8, 11, 13)
- Terry Trotter – acoustic piano (5, 6, 12)
- Alan Broadbent – acoustic piano (9, 10)
- John Pisano – guitars (1–3, 7, 13)
- Russell Malone – guitars (4–6, 8–12)
- Christian McBride – bass
- Lewis Nash – drums (1–3, 5–7, 9–12)
- Jeff Hamilton – drums (4, 8, 13)
- Luis Quintero – percussion (2, 9)
- Larry Bunker – percussion (8), vibraphone (8)
- Gary Foster – alto sax solo (6), tenor sax solo (13)
- Roy Hargrove – flugelhorn solo (9)
- Tollak Ollestad – harmonica solo (12)
- The Clayton-Hamilton Jazz Orchestra – orchestra (3, 4, 8, 13)
- The Colettes – backing vocals (2, 6, 12)
- Diana Krall – vocals (10)

Music arrangements

- Rob Mounsey – orchestral arrangements (1–3, 6, 7, 11–13)
- Natalie Cole – BGV arrangements (2, 6, 12)
- Alan Broadbent – orchestral arrangements (4, 5, 9, 10)
- John Clayton – orchestral arrangements (8)

=== Production ===
- Natalie Cole – executive producer, liner notes
- Tommy LiPuma – producer
- Elliot Scheiner – recording (1–3, 7, 13)
- Al Schmitt – recording (4–6, 8–12), orchestra recording, mixing
- Bill Smith – Pro Tools engineer
- Joe Brown – second engineer
- Steve Genewick – second engineer
- John Hendrickson – second engineer
- Aya Takemura – second engineer
- Doug Sax – mastering at The Mastering Lab (Hollywood, California)
- Shari Sutcliffe – production coordinator (Los Angeles, California)
- Jill Dell'Abate – production coordinator (New York)
- Dick LePalm – repertoire consultant
- Gail Deadrick – musical advisor
- Theodora Kuslan – release coordinator
- Kelly Pratt – release coordinator
- Hollis King – art direction
- Isabelle Wong – design
- Kuaku Alston – photography
- Sylva Grieser – wardrobe stylist
- Janet Zeitoun – hair
- Jay Manuel – make-up
- Dan Cleary – management

== Accolades ==
=== Grammy Awards ===
Year	Nominee / work	Award	Result
2003	Ask A Woman Who Knows	Best Jazz Vocal Album	Nominated
2003	"I'm Glad There Is You"	Best Instrumental Arrangement Accompanying Vocals	Nominated
2003	"Better Than Anything" (with Diana Krall)	Best Pop Collaboration With Vocals	Nominated
2003	Ask A Woman Who Knows	Best Engineered Album - Non-Classical	Nominated

== Charts ==
Chart (2002)	Peak position
US Billboard 200	24
US Top R&B/Hip-Hop Albums (Billboard)	24
US Top Jazz Albums (Billboard)	1

== Certifications ==
Region	Certification	Certified units/sales
United Kingdom (BPI)	Silver	60,000^{*}
United States	—	252,000
^{*} Sales figures based on certification alone.
