= Ike Cole =

American jazz pianist and composer (1927–2001)

- Born: Isaac Cole; July 13, 1927; Chicago, Illinois, U.S.
- Died: April 22, 2001 (aged 73) Sun Lakes, Arizona, U.S.
- Genres: Vocal jazz; swing; traditional pop; jump blues; vocal
- Occupation: Musician
- Instrument: Piano
- Labels: Decca; Capitol; United Artists; Dot; Dee Gee; Guest Star; Bally; Promenade; Frankie

Isaac Cole (July 13, 1927 – April 22, 2001) was an American jazz pianist and composer. He was the brother of musicians Nat King Cole, Eddie Cole, and Freddy Cole, and uncle of Natalie Cole, Lionel Cole, and Carole Cole.

== Life and career ==
Ike Cole was born to Rev. Edward J. Coles and Perlina (née Adams) Coles, and was born and grew up in Chicago, Illinois. His brothers Nat King Cole (1919–1965), Eddie (1910–1970), and Freddy (1931–2020) also each pursued careers in music. Ike played drums in his youth. He played bass drum in a U.S. Army band during the Korean War, and moved back to Chicago after his discharge, where he formed his own jazz trio. He appeared on television in the 1950s and held a residency in Las Vegas, later touring internationally. He made regular appearances at Chicago clubs such as the Pump Room and the Playboy Club before moving to Arizona in 1986 with his wife, Margie. Ike and Margie Cole remained married until Ike's death, lasting 52 years. In 1990 he and Freddy Cole, who was a singer and pianist, toured together in tribute to Nat Cole, and in 1991 Ike played keyboards on Natalie Cole's Unforgettable, which won a Grammy Award. He died of cancer in 2001 in Sun Lakes, Arizona. His jazz library was donated to the Hamilton High School music department.
