= I'm Ready (Natalie Cole album) =

Studio album by Natalie Cole
- Released: April 21, 1983
- Recorded: 1982–83
- Studio: Larrabee Sound Studios (North Hollywood, California); A&M Studios and Ocean Way Recording (Hollywood, California); Mad Hatter Studios (Los Angeles, California)
- Genre: R&B; soul
- Length: 36:49 (Original LP release); 57:49 (CD release)
- Label: Epic
- Producer: Marvin Yancy; Chuck Jackson; Stanley Clarke; Chuck Bynum

Natalie Cole chronology
Happy Love (1981)	I'm Ready (1983)	Dangerous (1985)

I'm Ready is the ninth studio album by American R&B singer Natalie Cole. Released on April 21, 1983, it was her only album released on Epic Records. The album peaked at No. 182 on the Billboard 200 and No. 54 on Billboard's R&B Albums chart.

"Too Much Mister" was released as a single in both the US and UK in August 1983 and was premiered on the Greg Edwards Show on Capital Radio (London area only) on Saturday 20 August 1983. The single, which returned Cole to the nightclub playlist, fared well on the UK Blues and Soul Chart and the album had a reasonable run on the UK Blues and Soul Album Chart.

== Track listing ==
All tracks composed by Chuck Jackson and Marvin Yancy; except where indicated.

Side one

1. "Too Much Mister" – 4:50
2. "I Won't Deny You" – 3:58
3. "I'm Ready" (Clarence McDonald, Jackson, Yancy) – 4:10
4. "Keep It On the Outside" – 4:21

Side two

1. "Time (Heals All Wounds)" (Chuck Bynum, Joe Blocker, Natalie Cole) – 5:24
2. "(I'm Coming) Straight from the Heart" – 5:10
3. "Where's Your Angel" (Allee Willis, Greg Phillinganes) – 3:55
4. "I'm Your Mirror" (Natalie Cole) – 5:01

CD Bonus Tracks

1. "Winner (Takes All)" (Eddie Cole, Natalie Cole) – 5:11
2. "Azz Iz" (Larry Batiste, Claytoven Richardson) – 5:41
3. "Movin' On" (Eddie Cole, Natalie Cole) – 5:23
4. "How Can You Stop" (Natalie Cole) – 4:43

== Personnel ==
- Larkin Arnold – executive producer
- Chuck Jackson – producer (1–4, 7), mixing (1–8)
- Marvin Yancy – producer (1–4, 7), mixing (1–8)
- Charles Bynum – producer (5)
- Stanley Clarke – producer (5, 6, 8–12)
- Barry Rudolph – recording (1–8), mixing (1–8)
- Erik Zobler – recording (9–12)
- Sabrina Buchanek – assistant engineer (9–12)
- Jeff Clapp – assistant engineer (9–12)
- Jeff Silver – assistant engineer (9–12)
- Tony Lane – design
- Nancy Donald – design
- Roger Williams – artwork, design
- Jerry Rosengren – photography

== Charts ==
Chart (1983)	Peak position
US Billboard 200	182
US Top R&B/Hip-Hop Albums (Billboard)	54
