= I Love You So =

Studio album by Natalie Cole
- Released: March 19, 1979
- Recorded: 1978–1979
- Studio: The Sound Factory, United Western Recorders and Hollywood Sound Recorders (Hollywood, California); ABC Recording Studios and Love N'Comfort Studios (Los Angeles, California); MCA Whitney Recording Studios (Glendale, California)
- Genre: R&B; soul
- Length: 39:11
- Label: Capitol
- Producer: Chuck Jackson; Marvin Yancy; Gene Barge

Natalie Cole chronology
Natalie Live! (1978)	I Love You So (1979)	We're the Best of Friends (1979)

Professional ratings
Review scores
Source	Rating
AllMusic	3/5 stars
Music Week	2/4 stars

I Love You So is an album by American singer Natalie Cole. Released on March 19, 1979, by Capitol Records, The album reached peak positions of number 52 on the Billboard 200 and number 11 on the Billboard R&B Albums chart.

== Track listing ==
1. "I Love You So" (Chuck Jackson, Marvin Yancy) - 4:49
2. "You're So Good" (Fred Freeman, Harry Nehls) - 3:23
3. "It's Been You" (Chuck Jackson, Marvin Yancy) - 4:53
4. "Your Lonely Heart" (Natalie Cole, Rob Halprin) - 4:45
5. "The Winner" (Chuck Jackson, Gene Barge, Marvin Yancy, Rob Halprin) - 3:40
6. "Oh, Daddy" (Christine McVie) - 4:03
7. "Sorry" (Chuck Jackson, Marvin Yancy, Jessy Dixon) - 4:45
8. "Stand by" (Natalie Cole, Marvin Yancy) - 4:19
9. "Who Will Carry On" (Natalie Cole) - 3:36

== Personnel ==
Musicians and Vocalists

- Natalie Cole – lead vocals
- Reginald "Sonny" Burke – keyboards
- Mark Davis – keyboards
- Linda Williams – keyboards
- Marvin Yancy – keyboards
- Chuck Bynum – guitars, backing vocals (4)
- Richard Fortune – guitars
- Johnny McGhee – guitars
- Phil Upchurch – guitars
- Norman Zeller – guitars
- Stephen Dietrich – electric steel guitar
- Keni Burke – bass
- Bobby Eaton – bass
- Jeff Eyrich – bass
- Alvin Taylor – drums
- Teddy Sparks – drums
- Oliver C. Brown – percussion
- Bill Green – oboe, woodwinds
- Fred Jackson Jr. – woodwinds
- Ernie Watts – woodwinds
- George Bohanon – trombone
- Maurice Spears – trombone
- Oscar Brashear – trumpet
- Bobby Bryant – trumpet
- Nolan Smith – trumpet
- The Colettes – backing vocals
- The "N" Sisters – backing vocals
- Anita Anderson – backing vocals (7)
- Sissy Peoples – backing vocals (7)

Music arrangements

- Gene Barge – rhythm, horn and string arrangements
- Mark Davis – rhythm arrangements
- Paul Riser – horn and string arrangements

Music contractors

- George Bohanon
- Billy Page
- McKinley Jackson

== Production ==
- Kevin Hunter – executive producer, management
- Gene Barge – producer
- Chuck Johnson – producer
- Marvin Yancy – producer
- Melissa Tormé-March – cover coordinator
- John Ernsdorf – graphics
- Vincent Frye – photography
- Emory Jones – hair
- Davida – make-up
- Janice Williams – spiritual advisor
- New Direction – management

Technical credits

- Wally Traugott – mastering at Capitol Studios (Hollywood, California)
- Gerry Brown – orchestra sweetening engineer
- Mark Davis – remix engineer, rhythm track engineer
- Reginald Dozier – orchestra sweetening engineer, remix engineer
- Frank Kejmar – orchestra sweetening engineer
- Donald "Butch" Lynch – remix engineer, rhythm track engineer
- Clay McMurray – remix engineer
- Zoli Osaze – orchestra sweetening engineer
- Serge Reyes – remix engineer, rhythm track engineer
- Al Schmitt – orchestra sweetening engineer
- Gordon Shyrock – vocal engineer

== Charts ==
Chart (1979)	Peak position
US Billboard Top LPs	52
US Billboard Top Soul LPs	11

== Certifications ==
Region	Certification	Certified units/sales
United States (RIAA)	Gold	500,000^{^}
^{^} Shipments figures based on certification alone.
