= Thankful (Natalie Cole album) =

Studio album by Natalie Cole
- Released: November 16, 1977
- Recorded: August–November 1977
- Studio: ABC Recording Studios and Westlake Audio (Los Angeles, California)
- Genre: R&B; soul
- Length: 35:31
- Label: Capitol
- Producer: Chuck Jackson; Marvin Yancy

Natalie Cole chronology
Unpredictable (1977)	Thankful (1977)	Natalie Live! (1978)

Singles from Thankful
- 1. "Our Love" Released: November 6, 1977; 2. "Annie Mae" Released: February 8, 1978

Professional ratings
Review scores
Source	Rating
AllMusic	3/5 stars
Christgau's Record Guide	B−

Thankful is the fourth album by the American singer Natalie Cole. It was released on November 16, 1977, by Capitol Records. In 1978, the album's first single, "Our Love", peaked at No. 10 on the U.S. Billboard Hot 100 and topped the Hot R&B chart.

== Track listing ==
All tracks are written by Chuck Jackson and Marvin Yancy, except where noted.

Side one
No.	Title	Writer(s)	Length
1.	"Lovers"	Chuck Jackson, Marvin Yancy, Natalie Cole	3:47
2.	"Our Love"		5:22
3.	"La Costa"	Natalie Cole, Linda Williams	3:50
4.	"There Ain't Nothing Stronger Than Love"		4:54

Side two
No.	Title	Writer(s)	Length
5.	"Be Thankful"		3:49
6.	"Just Can't Stay Away"		5:23
7.	"Annie Mae"	Natalie Cole	4:00
8.	"Keeping a Light"	Natalie Cole	4:06

== Personnel ==
- Natalie Cole – lead vocals
- Linda Williams – acoustic piano, Fender Rhodes
- Marvin Yancy – acoustic piano, organ, clavinet
- Reginald "Sonny" Burke – organ
- Michael Boddicker – synthesizers
- Criss Johnson – guitars
- Ray Parker Jr. – guitars
- Lee Ritenour – guitars
- Larry Ball – bass guitar
- James Gadson – drums
- Donnell Hagan – drums
- Paul Humphrey – drums
- Teddy Sparks – drums
- Alan Estes – percussion
- Hal Brooks – handclaps
- Chuck Jackson – handclaps
- Gene Barge – alto sax solo (6), arrangements
- Richard Evans – arrangements
- The Colettes – backing vocals (1–5, 7, 8)
- The "N" Sisters – backing vocals (1–5, 7, 8)
- Anita Anderson – backing vocals (6)
- Yasmine "Sissy" Peoples – backing vocals (6)

== Production ==
- Larkin Arnold – executive producer
- Chuck Jackson – producer, mixing
- Marvin Yancy – producer, mixing
- Gene Barge – co-producer (5)
- Barney Perkins – head engineer, mixing, mastering
- Zollie Johnson – assistant engineer
- Lester Smith – assistant engineer
- Dean Rod – mix assistant
- John Golden – mastering
- Kendun Recorders (Burbank, California) – mastering location
- Roy Kohara – art direction
- Craig Nelson – illustration
- Ernest Eugene – fan club insert
- Janice Williams – spiritual advisor
- Kevin Hunter for New Direction – management

== Notes ==
- R&B/pop group En Vogue recorded a cover of "Just Can't Stay Away", which appears on their 1990 debut album Born to Sing.
- Singer Mary J. Blige recorded a cover version of "Our Love" for her 1997 album Share My World.

== Charts ==
=== Weekly charts ===
Chart (1977–1978)	Peak position
US Billboard 200	16
US Top R&B/Hip-Hop Albums (Billboard)	5

=== Year-end charts ===
Chart (1978)	Position
US Billboard 200	24
US Top R&B/Hip-Hop Albums (Billboard)	6

=== Singles ===
Year	Single	Peak chart positions		
Year	Single	US	US R&B	US A/C
1977	"Our Love"	10	1	33
1978	"Annie Mae"	—	6	—

== Certifications ==
Region	Certification	Certified units/sales
United States (RIAA)	Platinum	1,000,000^{^}
^{^} Shipments figures based on certification alone.
