= Happy Love =

Studio album by Natalie Cole
- Released: July 18, 1981
- Recorded: 1981
- Studio: Sunset Sound (Hollywood, California)
- Genre: R&B; soul
- Length: 34:01
- Label: Capitol
- Producer: George Tobin; Mike Piccirillo

Natalie Cole chronology
Don't Look Back (1980)	Happy Love (1981)	I'm Ready (1983)

Professional ratings
Review scores
Source	Rating
The Encyclopedia of Popular Music	2/5 stars

Happy Love is an album by American singer Natalie Cole. Released on July 18, 1981, it was her final album on Capitol Records. The album reached peak positions of number 132 on the Billboard 200 and number 37 on Billboard's R&B Albums chart.

== Track listing ==
1. "You Were Right Girl" (Gary Goetzman, Mike Piccirillo) – 3:16
2. "Only Love" (Gary Goetzman, Mike Piccirillo) – 3:44
3. "Nothin' but a Fool" (Bill Amesbury) – 4:20
4. "The Joke Is on You" (Eddie Cole, Natalie Cole) – 3:22
5. "These Eyes" (Burton Cummings, Randy Bachman) – 3:37
6. "When a Man Loves a Woman" (Andrew Wright, Calvin Lewis) – 3:47
7. "I Can't Let Go" (Gary Goetzman, Mike Piccirillo) – 3:07
8. "Love and Kisses" (Natalie Cole) – 3:43
9. "Across the Nation" (Mark Davis, Natalie Cole) – 5:16

== Personnel ==
Musicians

- Natalie Cole – vocals, arrangements (8, 9)
- Bill Cuomo – keyboards
- Mike Piccirillo – synthesizers, guitars, arrangements (1–7)
- Eddie Cole – acoustic piano (4), Fender Rhodes (8)
- Chuck Bynum – acoustic guitar (8)
- Keni Burke – bass
- Scott Edwards – bass
- Ed Greene – drums
- Joel Peskin – saxophones
- Harry Kim – trumpet
- Jeff Worrell – handclaps (9)
- Laurie Worrell – handclaps (9)
- George Tobin – arrangements (1–7)

Background vocalists

- Eddie Cole – backing vocals
- Natalie Cole – backing vocals
- Pat Henderson – backing vocals
- Mike Piccirillo – backing vocals
- Julia Tillman Waters – backing vocals
- Maxine Willard Waters – backing vocals
- Anita Anderson – additional backing vocals (8)
- Yasmin "Sissy" Peoples – additional backing vocals (8)

Production

- Kevin Hunter – executive producer, management
- Varnell Johnson – executive producer
- Mike Piccirillo – producer, mixing
- George Tobin – producer, mixing
- Howard Wolen – engineer
- Mark Wolfson – engineer
- John Volaitis – assistant engineer
- John Lemay – mastering at Capitol Studios (Hollywood, California)
- Gary Goetzman – direction
- Richie Griffin – production assistant
- Judy Johnson – session coordinator
- Lisa Marie – session coordinator
- Glen Christensen – art direction, photography
- Emory Jones – hair stylist
- Jeff Angel – make-up

== Charts ==
Chart (1981)	Peak position
US Billboard 200	132
US Top R&B/Hip-Hop Albums (Billboard)	37
