= Natalie Cole =

American singer (1950–2015)

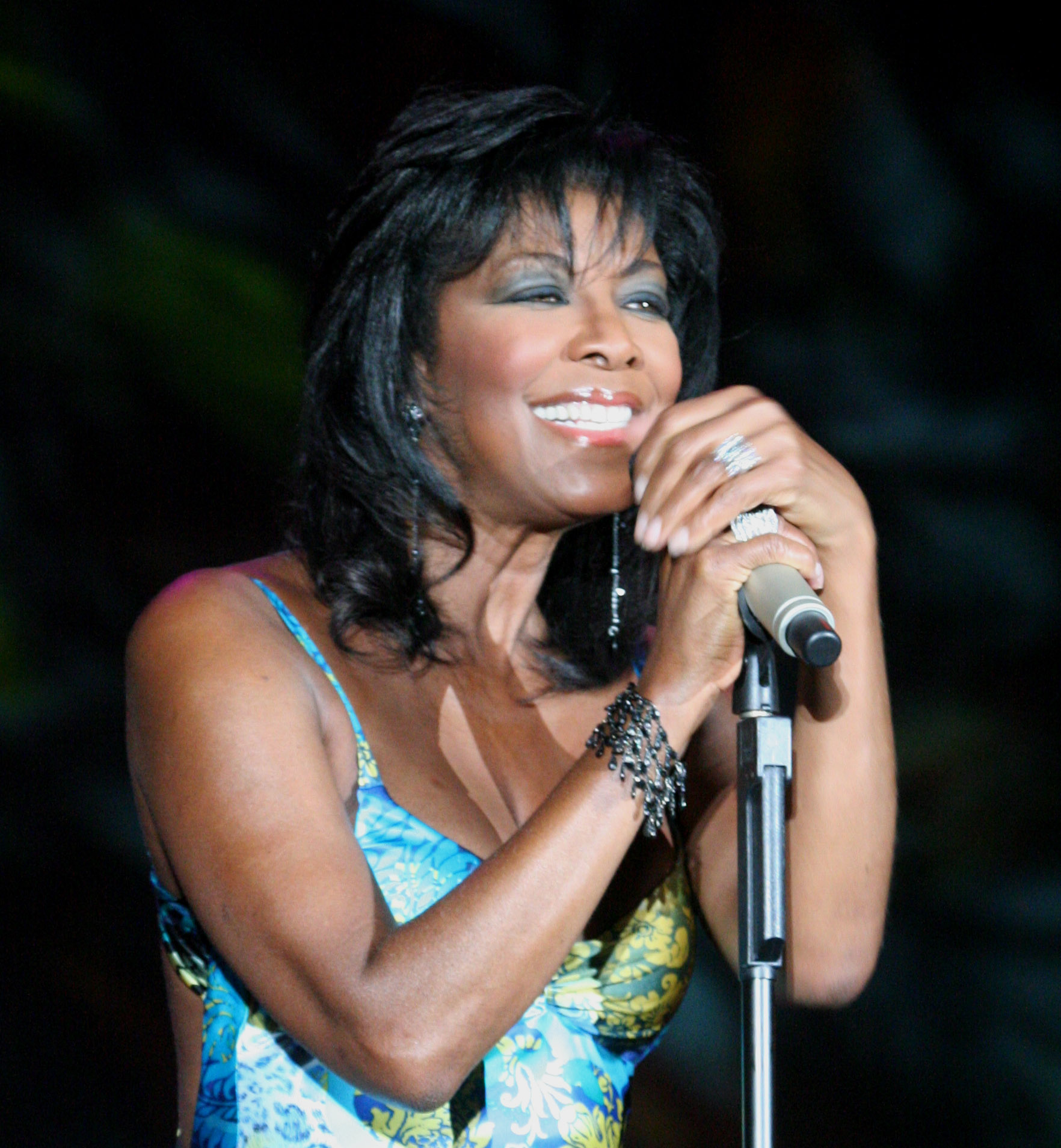
- Cole performing in 2007
- Born: Natalie Maria Cole; February 6, 1950; Los Angeles, California, U.S.
- Died: December 31, 2015 (aged 65); Los Angeles, California, U.S.
- Resting place: Forest Lawn Memorial Park
- Occupations: Singer; songwriter; actress
- Years active: 1956–2015
- Spouses: Marvin Yancy (m. 1976; div. 1980); Andre Fischer (m. 1989; div. 1995); Kenneth Dupree (m. 2001; div. 2004)
- Children: 1
- Parent(s): Nat King Cole; Maria Cole
- Relatives: Carole Cole (sister); Eddie Cole (uncle); Ike Cole (uncle); Freddy Cole (uncle); Lionel Cole (cousin)
- Musical career
- Origin: Chicago, Illinois, U.S.
- Genres: R&B; soul; jazz; pop
- Instrument: Vocals
- Labels: Capitol; Epic; Modern; EMI-Manhattan; Elektra; Verve; ATCO; Rhino
- Website: officialnataliecole.com

Natalie Maria Cole (February 6, 1950 – December 31, 2015) was an American singer, songwriter, and actress. She was the daughter of singer and jazz pianist Nat King Cole. She rose to prominence in the mid-1970s, with the release of her debut album Inseparable (1975), along with the song "This Will Be (An Everlasting Love)", and the album's title track. Its success led to her receiving the Grammy Award for Best New Artist at the 18th Annual Grammy Awards, for which she became the first African-American recipient as well as the first R&B act to win the award. The singles "Sophisticated Lady" (1976), "I've Got Love on My Mind", and "Our Love" (1977) followed.

After releasing several albums, she departed from her R&B sound and returned as a pop singer on the 1987 album Everlasting, along with her cover of Bruce Springsteen's "Pink Cadillac". In the 1990s, she sang traditional pop by her father, resulting in her biggest success, Unforgettable... with Love, which was certified 7× platinum by the Recording Industry Association of America (RIAA). Unforgettable... with Love won the Grammy Award for Album of the Year, for which Cole became the first African-American woman to win the award.

Throughout her lifetime, Cole received nine Grammy Awards, was nominated for a Primetime Emmy Award, and sold over 30 million records worldwide. She was awarded the Howie Richmond Hitmaker Award from the Songwriters Hall of Fame in 1999, and has been posthumously inducted into the National Rhythm & Blues Hall of Fame (2021), and received a star on the Hollywood Walk of Fame.

== Early life ==
On the evening of February 6, 1950, Natalie Maria Cole was born at Cedars of Lebanon Hospital in Los Angeles, California, to American singer and jazz pianist Nat King Cole and former Duke Ellington Orchestra singer Maria Hawkins Ellington. Two hours later, her father—then working exclusively in L.A., having declined all out-of-town engagements prior to the baby's arrival—"brought down the house" at Eddie DeSure's Club Oasis with his opening selection, Kahn and Donaldson's "Yes Sir, That's My Baby".

Raised in the affluent Hancock Park district of Los Angeles, Cole later referred to her family in those years as "the black Kennedys" and was exposed to many great singers of jazz, soul and blues. Cole sang on her father's 1960 Christmas album The Magic of Christmas and later started performing at age 11.

Cole grew up with an older adopted sister, Carole "Cookie" Cole (1944–2009), her mother Maria's younger sister's daughter, adopted brother Nat "Kelly" Cole (1959–1995), and younger twin sisters Timolin and Casey (born 1961). Through her mother, Cole was a grandniece of educator Charlotte Hawkins Brown. Her paternal uncle Freddy Cole was a singer and pianist with numerous albums and awards.

Cole enrolled in Northfield School for Girls (since 1971 known as Northfield Mount Hermon School after merging with another school), an elite New England preparatory school, before her father died of lung cancer in February 1965. Soon afterwards she began having a difficult relationship with her mother. Cole attended The Buckley School, a private school in Sherman Oaks, California, and then enrolled in the University of Massachusetts Amherst. She transferred briefly to University of Southern California, where she pledged the Upsilon chapter of Delta Sigma Theta sorority. She later transferred back to the University of Massachusetts, where she majored in Child Psychology and minored in German, graduating in 1972.

== Music career ==
=== Early career ===
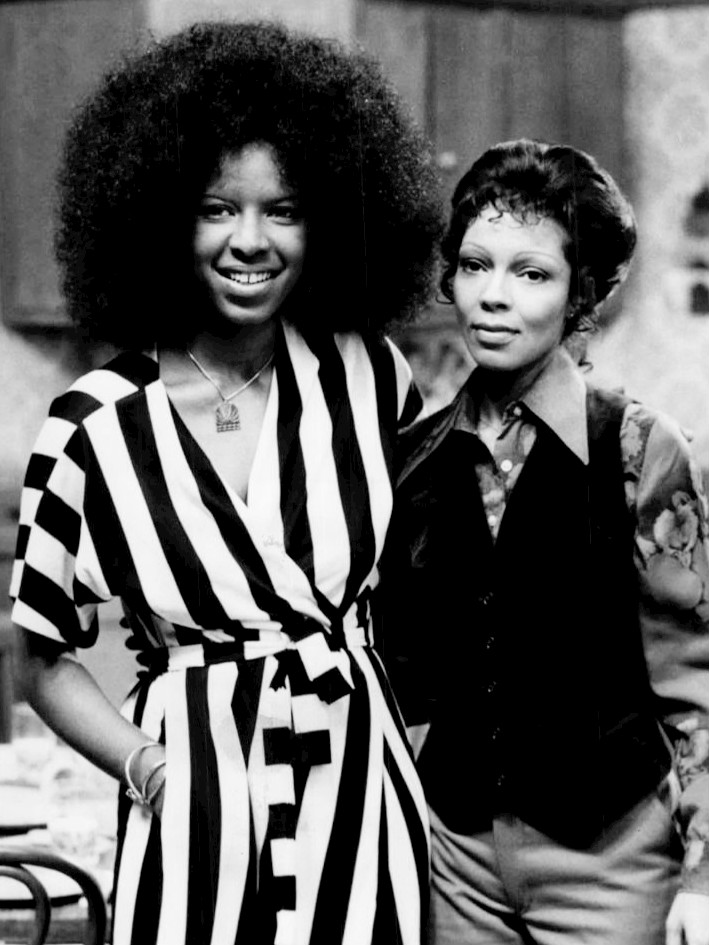
Natalie and Carole Cole at NBC studios, 1975

Cole grew up listening to a variety of music that included Aretha Franklin and Janis Joplin. After graduation in 1972 she began singing at small clubs with her band, Black Magic. Clubs initially welcomed her because she was Nat King Cole's daughter, only to be disappointed when she began singing cover versions of R&B and rock songs.

With the assistance of Chuck Jackson and Marvin Yancy, a songwriting and producing duo, she recorded some songs in a studio in Chicago that was owned by Curtis Mayfield. Her demo tapes led to a contract with Capitol, resulting in the release of Cole's debut album, Inseparable, which included songs that reminded listeners of Aretha Franklin. Franklin later contended that songs such as "This Will Be", "I Can't Say No", and others were offered to her while she was recording the album You but she had turned them down. Released in 1975, the album became an instant success thanks to "This Will Be", which became a top ten hit and won her a Grammy Award for Best Female R&B Vocal Performance.

A second single, "Inseparable", also became a hit. Both songs reached number-one on the R&B chart. Cole won Best New Artist at the Grammy Awards for her accomplishments, making her the first African-American artist to attain that feat. The media's billing of Cole as the "new Aretha Franklin" started a rivalry between the two singers. The feud boiled over at the 19th Annual Grammy Awards in 1977 when Cole beat Franklin in the Best Female R&B Vocal Performance category, a category which Franklin had won in the first eight years of the category. Contrary to popular belief, Franklin wasn't nominated for a Grammy for the 1976 ceremony, but Cole and Franklin were nominated in the following year where Cole's 1976 hit "Sophisticated Lady (She's a Different Lady)" beat Franklin's "Something He Can Feel" for that Grammy.

=== Stardom ===
Becoming an instant star, Cole responded to critics who predicted a sophomore slump with Natalie, released in 1976. The album, like Inseparable, became a gold success thanks to the funk-influenced cut "Sophisticated Lady" and the jazz-influenced "Mr. Melody".

Cole released her first platinum record with her third release, Unpredictable, mainly thanks to the number-one R&B hit "I've Got Love on My Mind". Originally an album track, the album's closer, "I'm Catching Hell", nonetheless became a popular Cole song during live concert shows. Later in 1977, Cole issued her fourth release and second platinum album, Thankful, which included another signature Cole hit, "Our Love". Cole was the first female artist to have two platinum albums in one year. To capitalize on her fame, Cole starred on her own TV special, which attracted such celebrities as Earth, Wind & Fire, and appeared on the TV special Sinatra and Friends. In 1978, Cole released her first live album, Natalie Live!

In early 1979, the singer was awarded a star on the Hollywood Walk of Fame. That same year, she released two more albums, I Love You So and the Peabo Bryson duet album, We're the Best of Friends.

=== Detour and resurgence ===
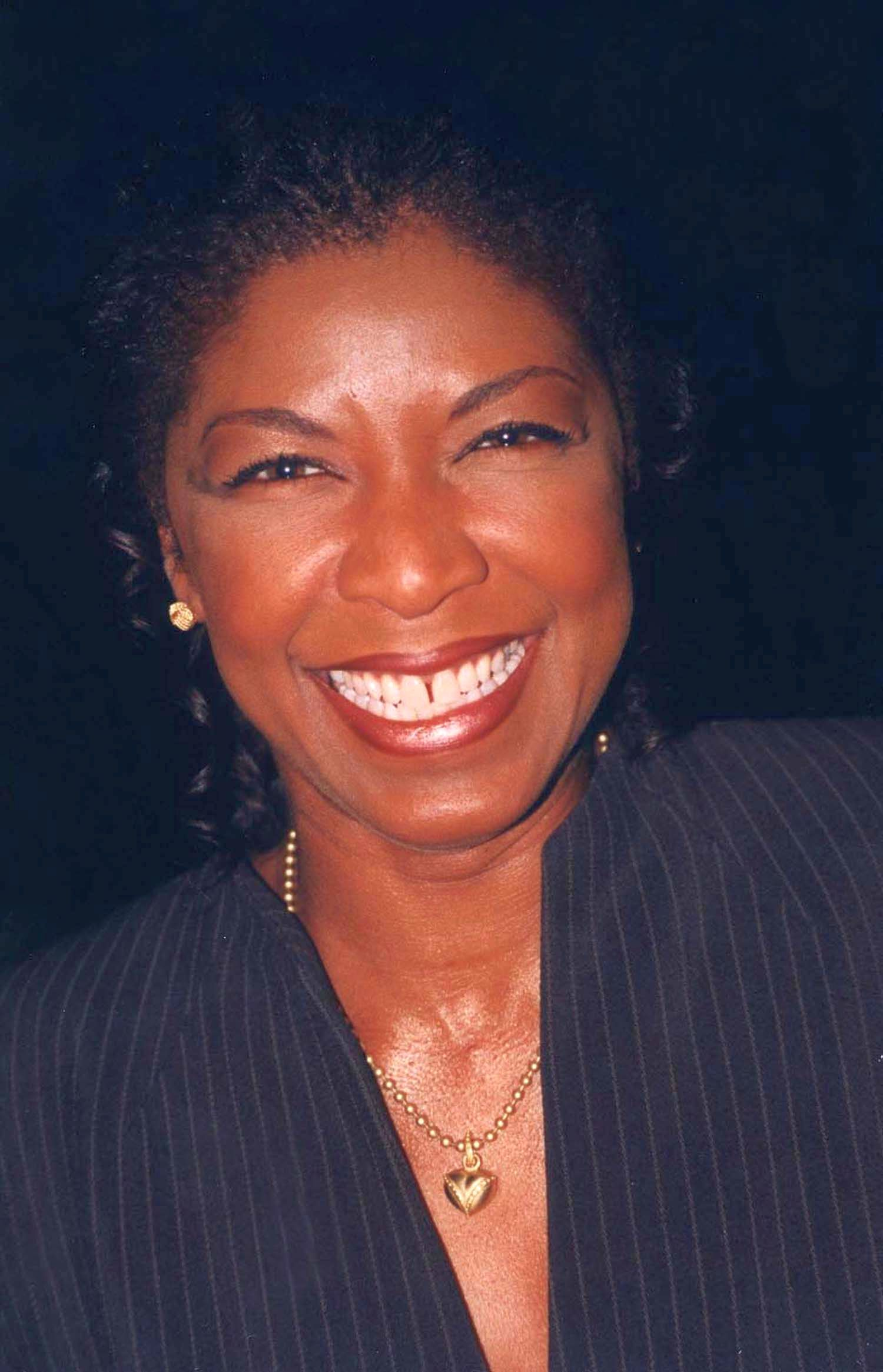
Cole in 1996

Following the release of her eighth album, 1980's Don't Look Back, Cole's career began to take a detour. While Cole scored an adult contemporary hit with the soft rock ballad "Someone That I Used to Love" off the album, the album itself failed to go gold. In 1981, Cole's personal problems, including battles with drug addiction, began to attract public notice, and her career suffered as a result. In 1983, following the release of her album I'm Ready, released on Epic, Cole entered a rehab facility in Minnesota and stayed there for six months.

Following her release, she signed with the Atco imprint Modern Records and released Dangerous, which started a slow resurgence for Cole in terms of record sales and chart success. In 1987, she changed to EMI-Manhattan Records and released the album Everlasting, which returned her to the top of the charts thanks to singles such as "Jump Start (My Heart)", the top ten ballad, "I Live for Your Love", and her dance-pop cover of Bruce Springsteen's "Pink Cadillac". That success helped Everlasting reach one million in sales and become Cole's first platinum album in ten years.

In 1989, she released her follow-up to Everlasting, Good to Be Back, which produced the number seven hit "Miss You Like Crazy", which became her biggest hit in the United Kingdom by reaching number two on the UK Singles Chart. While the album failed to reach Gold certification in the US, it achieved international success by becoming her only top ten album in the UK, and later being certified Gold there.

Cole released her bestselling album with 1991's Unforgettable... with Love on Elektra Records, which saw Cole singing songs her famous father recorded, nearly 20 years after she initially had refused to cover her father's songs during live concerts. Cole produced vocal arrangements for the songs, with piano accompaniment by her uncle Ike Cole. Cole's label released an interactive duet between Cole and her father on the title song, "Unforgettable". The song eventually reached number fourteen on the Billboard Hot 100 and number ten on the R&B chart, going gold. Unforgettable...with Love eventually sold more than 7 million copies in the U.S. alone and won several Grammys, including Album of the Year, Record of the Year and Best Traditional Pop Vocal Performance for the top song.

Alongside signing for new material with Elektra, she transferred rights of her EMI-Manhattan catalog.

Cole followed that success with another album of jazz standards, titled Take a Look, in 1993, which included her recording of the title track in the same styling that her idol Aretha Franklin had recorded nearly 30 years earlier. The album eventually went gold while a holiday album, Holly & Ivy, also became gold. Another standards release, Stardust, went platinum and featured another duet with her father on a modern version of "When I Fall in Love", which helped Cole earn another Grammy for Best Pop Collaboration with Vocals.

In 1995, Cole was awarded an Honorary Doctorate of Music from the Berklee College of Music.

In 1999, Cole returned to her 1980s-era urban contemporary recording style with the release of Snowfall on the Sahara in June and second Christmas album The Magic of Christmas in October, which was recorded with the London Symphony Orchestra. A year later, the singer collaborated on the production of her biopic, Livin' for Love: The Natalie Cole Story with Theresa Randle playing Natalie Cole. She also released the compilation Greatest Hits, Vol. 1 to fulfill her contract with Elektra. All albums she recorded for Elektra and EMI-Manhattan are no longer controlled by Warner Music Group; they were sold to Concord Music Group and are available digitally via Craft Recordings division.

She changed to Verve Records and released two albums. Ask a Woman Who Knows (2002) continued her jazz aspirations, while Leavin (2006) was an album of pop, rock, and R&B songs. Her version of "Daydreaming" by Aretha Franklin was a minor hit on the R&B chart. In 2008, seventeen years after Unforgettable... with Love, she released Still Unforgettable, which included songs made famous by her father and Frank Sinatra. In April 2012, she appeared on the Pennington Great Performers with the Baton Rouge Symphony Orchestra.

== Television and film career ==
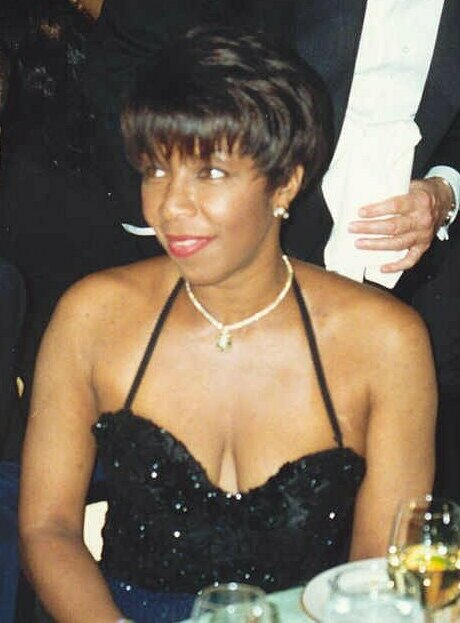
Cole at the 1992 Emmy Awards

Cole pursued a career in acting. She appeared several times in concerts or other music related programs, including the 1988 Nelson Mandela 70th Birthday Tribute with sidemen Richard Campbell, Jeffrey Worrell, Eddie Cole, and Dave Joyce.

In 1990, Cole hosted the TV show Big Break, a talent competition where singers and musicians competed for a $100,000 prize. That year, she and Al Jarreau sang "Mr. President" on the television special Comic Relief special.

After Johnny Mathis appeared on a special of Cole's in 1980, the two kept in contact, and in 1983 he invited her to be a part of his television special A Tribute to Nat Cole for the BBC in England. An album of the same name was released. In 1992, following the success of the Unforgettable: With Love album, PBS broadcast a special based on the album. Unforgettable, With Love: Natalie Cole Sings the Songs of Nat "King" Cole received an Emmy nomination for Outstanding Variety, Music or Comedy Program. Cole received a nomination for Outstanding Individual Performance but lost to Bette Midler.

In 1993, she was among the guests of honor attending Wrestlemania IX at Caesars Palace in Las Vegas. At the 65th Academy Awards she performed a medley of two Oscar-nominated songs: "Run to You" and "I Have Nothing", both performed by Whitney Houston in the film The Bodyguard. Cole made a number of dramatic appearances on television, including I'll Fly Away, Touched by an Angel, Law & Order: Special Victims Unit, and Grey's Anatomy.

She had the lead role in the TV movie Lily in Winter. She appeared in the Cole Porter biopic De-Lovely. In 2001, she starred as herself in Livin' for Love: the Natalie Cole Story, for which she received the NAACP Image Award for Outstanding Actress in a Television Movie, Mini-Series or Dramatic Special.

On the February 5, 2007, episode of Studio 60 on the Sunset Strip, Cole sang "I Say a Little Prayer" at a benefit dinner. She sang the national anthem with the Atlanta University Center Chorus at Super Bowl XXVIII. In 2013, she was a guest on Tina Sinatra's Father's Day Special on Sirius Radio. The program included Deana Martin, Monica Mancini, and Daisy Torme reminiscing about their famous fathers.

On February 13, 2012, Cole was a guest judge on the third episode of RuPaul’s Drag Race Season 4. The episode showed DiDa Ritz and The Princess lip synching to Cole's song, This Will Be (An Everlasting Love). This is widely considered one of the best lipsyncs to come from the show.

== Personal life ==
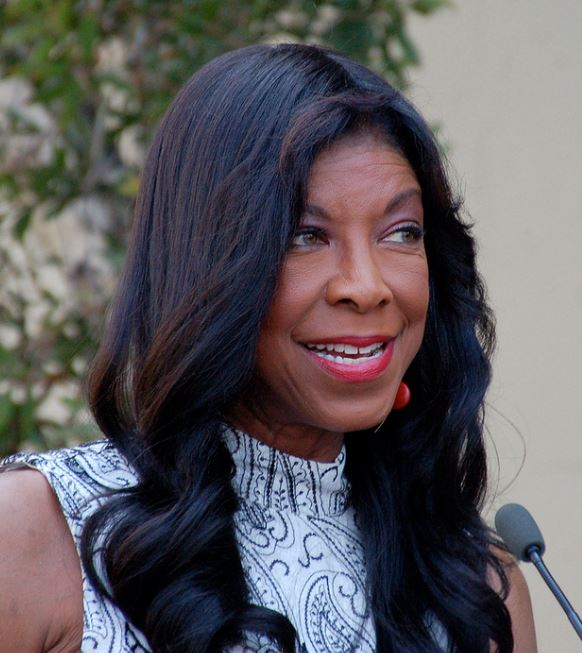
Cole in 2013

Cole was married three times. She married Marvin Yancy, songwriter, producer, and former member of the 1970s R&B group The Independents in July 1976 in Chicago. They had a son, Robert Adam "Robbie" Yancy (October 14, 1977 – August 14, 2017), who was a musician who toured with her. He died of a heart attack in 2017.

In 1976, with the testimony of her husband Marvin, a pastor, she became a Baptist Christian.

Cole and Yancy divorced in 1980. Yancy died of a heart attack in 1985, aged 34.

In 1989, Cole married record producer and former drummer for the band Rufus, Andre Fischer. They divorced in 1995.

In 2001, Cole married Bishop Kenneth Dupree. They divorced in 2004.

Cole was active in the Afghan World Foundation cause, supporting Sonia Nassery Cole (no relation).

=== Drug use and recovery ===
In 2000, Cole released an autobiography, Angel on My Shoulder, which described her battle with drugs during much of her life, including heroin and crack cocaine. At one stage of her addiction, Cole worked as a prostitute's tout in order to fund her drug habit. Cole said she began recreational drug use while attending the University of Massachusetts Amherst. She was arrested in Toronto, Canada, for possession of heroin in 1975.

Cole spiraled out of control in this phase of her life. There was an incident in which she refused to leave a burning building, and another in which her young son Robert nearly drowned in the family swimming pool while she was on a drug binge. She entered rehab in 1983. Her autobiography was released in conjunction with a made-for-TV movie, Livin' for Love: The Natalie Cole Story, which aired December 10, 2000, on NBC and re-aired October 26, 2011, on Centric TV.

== Illness and death ==
Cole announced in 2008 that she had been diagnosed with hepatitis C, a liver disease spread through contact with infected blood. Cole attributed having the disease to her past intravenous drug use. Cole explained in 2009 that hepatitis C had "stayed in [her] body for 25 years, and it could still happen to addicts who are fooling around with drugs, especially needles."

Four months after starting treatment for hepatitis C, Cole experienced kidney failure and required dialysis three times a week for nine months. In May 2009, following her appeal for a kidney on The Larry King Show, she was contacted by the organ procurement agency One Legacy. The facilitated donation came from a family requesting that, if there were a match, their donor's kidney be designated for Cole.

Cole canceled several events in December 2015 due to her illness. Her last musical performance was a short set of three songs in Manila. She died at Cedars-Sinai Medical Center in Los Angeles on December 31, 2015 (New Year's Eve), at the age of 65. Cole's publicist said the singer's death was the result of congestive heart failure, which her family said was a complication of idiopathic pulmonary arterial hypertension, which she had been diagnosed with after her kidney transplant in 2009. Her family said in a statement, "Natalie fought a fierce, courageous battle, dying how she lived ... with dignity, strength and honor. Our beloved mother and sister will be greatly missed and remain unforgettable in our hearts forever."

Cole's funeral was held on January 11, 2016, at the West Angeles Church of God in Christ in Los Angeles. David Foster, Stevie Wonder, Smokey Robinson, Lionel Richie, Chaka Khan, Eddie Levert, Mary Wilson, Gladys Knight, Ledisi, Jesse Jackson, Angela Bassett, Denise Nicholas, Marla Gibbs, Jackée Harry and Freda Payne were among the mourners at the funeral. After the funeral, she was buried at Forest Lawn Memorial Park in Glendale, California. Her grave is located in the central lawn area of the "Court of Freedom" section, Garden of Honor; there is no public access to her grave.

== Discography ==
=== Studio albums ===
- Inseparable (1975)
- Natalie (1976)
- Unpredictable (1977)
- Thankful (1977)
- I Love You So (1979)
- Don't Look Back (1980)
- Happy Love (1981)
- I'm Ready (1983)
- Dangerous (1985)
- Everlasting (1987)
- Good to Be Back (1989)
- Unforgettable... with Love (1991)
- Take a Look (1993)
- Holly & Ivy (1994)
- Stardust (1996)
- Snowfall on the Sahara (1999)
- The Magic of Christmas with the London Symphony Orchestra (1999)
- Ask a Woman Who Knows (2002)
- Leavin' (2006)
- Still Unforgettable (2008)
- Caroling, Caroling: Christmas with Natalie Cole (2008)
- Natalie Cole en Español (2013)

== Filmography ==
Year	Title	Role	Notes
1990	Comic Relief	Herself (performing)	HBO special
1992	A Tribute to Nat King Cole	Herself (performing)	BBC special
1997	Cats Don't Dance	Sawyer (singing voice)	Animated movie
1998	Always Outnumbered	Lula Brown	
1999	Freak City	Eleanor Sorrell	
2004	De-Lovely	Musical performer	
2006	Grey's Anatomy	Mrs. Booker	Season 2 episode: "Band-Aid Covers the Bullet Hole"
2006	Law & Order: Special Victims Unit	Defense Attorney Serena Waldren	Season 7 episode 20: "Fat"
2007	Studio 60 on the Sunset Strip	Musical performer	Episode 14: "The Harriet Dinner" (Pt. 2)
2011	Real Housewives of New York City	Herself	Season 4 episode 16: "L.O.V.E."
2012	RuPaul's Drag Race	Herself/Judge	Season 4 episode 3: "Glamazons vs. Champions"
2012	Nat King Cole: Afraid of the Dark	Herself	STARS/ENCORE

== Awards and honors ==
=== Grammy Awards ===
The Grammy Awards are awarded annually by the National Academy of Recording Arts and Sciences. Cole received nine awards from 21 nominations.

Year	Category	Nominated work	Result
1976	Best New Artist	Natalie Cole	Won
1976	Best R&B Vocal Performance, Female	"This Will Be"	Won
1977	Best Pop Vocal Performance, Female	Natalie	Nominated
1977	Best R&B Vocal Performance, Female	"Sophisticated Lady"	Won
1978	Best R&B Vocal Performance, Female	"I've Got Love on My Mind"	Nominated
1979	Best R&B Vocal Performance, Female	"Our Love"	Nominated
1980	Best R&B Vocal Performance, Female	I Love You So	Nominated
1988	Best R&B Vocal Performance, Female	Everlasting	Nominated
1990	Best R&B Vocal Performance, Female	Good to Be Back	Nominated
1990	Best R&B Performance by a Duo or Group with Vocal	"We Sing Praises" (with Deniece Williams)	Nominated
1992	Album of the Year	Unforgettable... with Love	Won
1992	Record of the Year	"Unforgettable" (with Nat King Cole)	Won
1992	Best Traditional Pop Performance	"Unforgettable" (with Nat King Cole)	Won
1992	Best Jazz Vocal Performance	Long 'Bout Midnight	Nominated
1994	Best Jazz Vocal Performance	Take a Look	Won
1997	Best Pop Collaboration with Vocals	"When I Fall in Love" (with Nat King Cole)	Won
1997	Best Traditional Pop Vocal Performance	Stardust	Nominated
2003	Best Pop Collaboration with Vocals	"Better Than Anything" (with Diana Krall)	Nominated
2003	Best Jazz Vocal Album	Ask a Woman Who Knows	Nominated
2007	Best Female R&B Vocal Performance	"Day Dreaming"	Nominated
2009	Best Traditional Pop Vocal Album	Still Unforgettable	Won

Latin Grammys

The Latin Grammy Awards are awarded annually by the Latin Academy of Recording Arts & Sciences.

Year	Category	Nominated work	Result	Ref.
2013	Record of the Year	"Bachata Rosa" (with Juan Luis Guerra)	Nominated	
2013	Album of the Year	Natalie Cole en Español	Nominated	
2013	Best Traditional Pop Vocal Album	Natalie Cole en Español	Nominated	

=== Other awards ===
Year	Association	Category	Result	Ref.
1977	American Music Awards	Favorite Female Artist – Soul / Rhythm & Blues	Won	
1978	American Music Awards	Favorite Female Artist – Soul / Rhythm & Blues	Won	
1991	American Music Awards	Favorite Artist – Adult Contemporary	Won	
1992	NAACP Image Awards	Best Jazz Artist	Won	
1993	George & Ira Gershwin Award	Lifetime Musical Achievement	Won	
1999	Songwriters Hall of Fame	Hitmaker Award	Won	
2000	NAACP Image Awards	Outstanding Actress – Television Movie, Miniseries or Dramatic Special: Livin for Love: The Natalie Cole Story	Won	
2001	NAACP Image Awards	Outstanding Album	Nominated	
2003	NAACP Image Awards	Best Jazz Artist	Won	
2010	Society of Singers	Society of Singers Lifetime Achievement Award	Won	
2014	NAACP Image Awards	Outstanding World Music Album: Natalie Cole en Español	Won	
2021	National R&B Hall of Fame	Herself	Inducted	

== See also ==
- List of Billboard number-one dance hits
- List of artists who reached number one on the U.S. dance chart
