= Unpredictable (Natalie Cole album) =

Studio album by Natalie Cole
- Released: February 22, 1977
- Recorded: 1976–77
- Studio: P.S. Recording Studios (Chicago, Illinois); Westlake Audio (Los Angeles, California)
- Genre: R&B; soul
- Length: 39:36
- Label: Capitol
- Producer: Chuck Jackson; Marvin Yancy

Natalie Cole chronology
Natalie (1976)	Unpredictable (1977)	Thankful (1977)

Singles from Inseparable
- 1. "I've Got Love on My Mind" Released: January 22, 1977; 2. "Party Lights" Released: May 5, 1977

Professional ratings
Review scores
Source	Rating
AllMusic	4/5 stars
The New Rolling Stone Record Guide	3/5 stars

Unpredictable is an album by the American singer Natalie Cole. Released on February 22, 1977, by Capitol Records, the album includes the single "I've Got Love on My Mind", which peaked at No. 5 on the U.S. Billboard Hot 100 and topped the R&B chart.

== Track listing ==
All tracks are written by Chuck Jackson and Marvin Yancy, except where noted.

Side one
No.	Title	Writer(s)	Length
1.	"This Heart"		4:07
2.	"Still in Love"		3:43
3.	"Party Lights"	Tennyson Stephens	4:09
4.	"I've Got Love on My Mind"		4:20
5.	"Unpredictable You"		3:40

Side two
No.	Title	Writer(s)	Length
6.	"Peaceful Living"	Natalie Cole; arranged by Richard Evans	4:19
7.	"Be Mine Tonight"		3:22
8.	"I Can't Break Away"		3:04
9.	"Your Eyes"	Natalie Cole; arranged by Richard Evans	2:41
10.	"I'm Catching Hell"		6:14

== Personnel ==
- Natalie Cole – lead vocals
- Tennyson Stephens – keyboards
- Marvin Yancy – keyboards
- Terry Fryer – synthesizers
- Criss Johnson – guitars
- Phil Upchurch – acoustic guitars
- Larry Ball – bass
- Donnell Hagan – drums
- Derf Reklaw – percussion
- The Colettes – backing vocals
- The "N" Sisters – backing vocals
- Gene Barge – rhythm arrangements (1–5, 7, 8, 10)
- Richard Evans – horn and string arrangements, rhythm arrangements (6, 9)

Production

- Larkin Arnold – executive producer
- Chuck Jackson – producer
- Marvin Yancy – producer
- Gene Barge – co-producer (3)
- Steve Hodge – engineer
- Paul Serrano – engineer
- Wally Traugott – mastering at Capitol Mastering (Hollywood, California)
- Roy Kohara – art direction
- Raul Vega – photography
- Janice Williams – spiritual advisor
- Kevin Hunter for New Direction – management

== Charts ==
=== Weekly charts ===
Chart (1977)	Peak position
US Billboard 200	8
US Top R&B/Hip-Hop Albums (Billboard)	1

=== Year-end charts ===
Chart (1977)	Position
US Billboard 200	53
US Top R&B/Hip-Hop Albums (Billboard)	10

=== Singles ===
Year	Single	Peak position		
Year	Single	US	US R&B	US A/C
1977	"I've Got Love on My Mind"	5	1	45
1977	"Party Lights"	79	9	—

== Certifications ==
Region	Certification	Certified units/sales
United States (RIAA)	Platinum	1,000,000^{^}
^{^} Shipments figures based on certification alone.

== See also ==
- List of number-one R&B albums of 1977 (U.S.)
