= I Live for Your Love =

Single by Natalie Cole

from the album Everlasting
- B-side: "More Than the Stars"
- Released: November 1987
- Genre: R&B
- Length: 4:23
- Label: EMI-Manhattan
- Songwriters: Pam Reswick; Allan Rich; Steve Werfel
- Producer: Dennis Lambert

Natalie Cole singles chronology
"Jump Start" (1987)	"I Live for Your Love" (1987)	"Pink Cadillac" (1988)

"I Live for Your Love" is a 1987 song by Natalie Cole. It was the second of four charting singles from her Everlasting LP, and was also the second greatest hit from the album.

The song reached number 13 on the U.S. Billboard Hot 100 during the winter of 1988. It was a major Adult Contemporary and R&B hit, reaching number two and number four on those charts, respectively. It was less of a hit on the Canadian pop and AC charts. After initially peaking at #86, in 1987, the song was given a re-release in the UK in 1988, and peaked at #23.

"I Live for Your Love" is Cole's longest-running chart single. It is her only song which spent over five months on the American pop charts. Her only bigger hit on the U.S. Adult Contemporary chart was "Miss You Like Crazy", which reached number one a year later.

The single shared a B-side with its predecessor, "Jump Start". Both songs were backed with "More Than the Stars".

== Chart history ==
=== Weekly charts ===
Chart (1987–1988)	Peak position
Canada RPM Top Singles	50
Canada RPM Adult Contemporary	25
UK Singles (OCC)	23
U.S. Billboard Hot 100	13
U.S. Adult Contemporary (Billboard)	2
U.S. Hot R&B Singles (Billboard)	4
U.S. Cash Box Top 100	19

=== Year-end charts ===
Chart (1988)	Rank
US Adult Contemporary Singles	13
