= Natalie (Natalie Cole album) =

Studio album by Natalie Cole
- Released: April 9, 1976
- Recorded: 1975–76
- Studio: Curtom Studios (Chicago, Illinois)
- Genre: R&B; soul
- Length: 34:31
- Label: Capitol
- Producer: Gene Barge; Richard Evans; Chuck Jackson; Marvin Yancy

Natalie Cole chronology
Inseparable (1975)	Natalie (1976)	Unpredictable (1977)

Singles from Natalie
- 1. "Sophisticated Lady (She's a Different Lady)" Released: April 12, 1976; 2. "Mr. Melody" Released: August 4, 1976

Professional ratings
Review scores
Source	Rating
AllMusic	4/5 stars
Christgau's Record Guide	C+
Rolling Stone	(average)

Natalie is a 1976 album by American singer Natalie Cole. Cole's second studio album, It was released on April 9, 1976, by Capitol Records. The album features the hit singles, "Sophisticated Lady (She's a Different Lady)" and "Mr. Melody". The track, "Sophisticated Lady (She's a Different Lady)" peaked at No 1 on Billboard's Hot R&B Singles and No 25 on the Billboard Hot 100 Charts.

== Track listing ==
All tracks are written by Chuck Jackson and Marvin Yancy, except where noted.

Side one
No.	Title	Writer(s)	Length
1.	"Mr. Melody"		3:07
2.	"Heaven Is With You"		4:17
3.	"Sophisticated Lady (She's a Different Lady)"	Jackson, Yancy, Natalie Cole	3:27
4.	"No Plans for the Future"		3:12
5.	"Can We Get Together Again"		3:12

Side two
No.	Title	Writer(s)	Length
6.	"Keep Smiling"		2:55
7.	"Good Morning Heartache"	Ervin Drake, Irene Higginbotham, Dan Fisher	4:19
8.	"Not Like Mine"	Jackson, Yancy, Cole	3:03
9.	"Touch Me"		4:14
10.	"Hard to Get Along"		2:45

== Personnel ==
- Natalie Cole – all vocals
- Tennyson Stephens – keyboards
- Marvin Yancy – keyboards, arrangements (3–5, 9, 10)
- Cash McCall – guitars
- Joseph "Lucky" Scott – bass guitar
- Quinton Joseph – drums
- Henry Gibson – percussion
- Chuck Jackson – percussion, arrangements (3, 5, 9, 10)
- Richard Evans – arrangements (1–5, 7)
- Gene Barge – arrangements (3, 6, 8–10)

== Production ==
- Larkin Arnold – executive producer
- Chuck Jackson – producer (1, 2, 4–10)
- Marvin Yancy – producer (1, 2, 4–10)
- Gene Barge – producer (3)
- Richard Evans – producer (3)
- Roger Anfinsen – engineer
- Fred Brietberg – engineer
- Wally Traugott – mastering at Capitol Studios (Hollywood, CA).
- Roy Kohara – art direction
- Charles W. Bush – photography
- Janice Williams – spiritual advisor
- Kevin Hunter – management

== Charts ==
Chart (1976)	Peak position
US Billboard 200	13
US Top R&B/Hip-Hop Albums (Billboard)	3

Singles

Year	Title	Peak position		
Year	Title	US	US R&B	US A/C
1976	"Sophisticated Lady (She's a Different Lady)"	25	1	—
1976	"Mr. Melody"	49	10	25

== Certifications ==
Region	Certification	Certified units/sales
United States (RIAA)	Gold	500,000^{^}
^{^} Shipments figures based on certification alone.
