= Inseparable (album) =

1975 studio album by Natalie Cole

Studio album by Natalie Cole
- Released: May 11, 1975
- Recorded: 1974–75
- Studio: Curtom (Chicago); Universal (Chicago); Paragon (Chicago)
- Genre: Soul
- Length: 29:54
- Label: Capitol
- Producer: Chuck Jackson; Marvin Yancy; Larkin Arnold (exec.)

Natalie Cole chronology
Inseparable (1975)	Natalie (1976)

Singles from Inseparable
- 1. "This Will Be (An Everlasting Love)" Released: April 12, 1975; 2. "Inseparable" Released: November 14, 1975

Inseparable is the debut studio album by American singer Natalie Cole, released on May 11, 1975, by Capitol Records. The album became her first gold-certified album and spawned the number-one R&B hits "This Will Be (An Everlasting Love)" and "Inseparable". The hit album and its singles earned Cole two Grammy Awards for Best New Artist and Best Female R&B Vocal Performance.

== History ==
By 1974, Natalie Cole, the daughter of legendary jazz/pop crooner Nat King Cole, was struggling to get her own music career off the ground. Ever since she had started performing at clubs and festivals, Cole had tried to forge her own path away from the one that several of her father's fans thought she would turn to. Cole refused to record jazz material in fear she would be accused of riding her father's coattails. A longtime fan of soul and blues singers such as Janis Joplin and Aretha Franklin, Cole had instead inspired to follow in their footsteps. After performing at one club, she was spotted by musicians Chuck Jackson (step-brother of Jesse Jackson) and Marvin Yancy, who was shopping songs that had been turned down by Franklin herself. Cole, Yancy and Jackson recorded demos for songs that later led to Cole being signed to her father's label, Capitol Records.

== Release and reaction ==
Professional ratings
Review scores
Source	Rating
AllMusic	4.5/5 stars
Christgau's Record Guide	B
Rolling Stone	(favorable)

Released in the spring of 1975, Inseparable shot to the top of the R&B album charts and was also a top twenty hit on the Billboard pop album charts sparked by the album's first single, "This Will Be (An Everlasting Love)". The song's Franklin-inspired production's catchy melodies and hooks helped to make it a number-one hit on the Hot Soul Singles chart while also reaching number six on the Billboard Hot 100. The title track also became a hit reaching number-one on the R&B chart while reaching number thirty-two on the Billboard Hot 100. Altogether, the album went platinum, selling over a million copies and helping Cole win two Grammy Awards including Best New Artist and Best Female R&B Vocal Performance, where she broke the winning streak set by Aretha Franklin, who had won the award eight years in a row. (For a time before Cole's win, the award was nicknamed The Aretha Award.) The album's success was the beginning of Cole's mid-1970s successes, as an R&B star releasing five gold albums and two platinum albums during her Capitol tenure.

== Track listing ==
All tracks are written by Chuck Jackson and Marvin Yancy, except where noted.

Side one
No.	Title	Length
1.	"Needing You"	2:45
2.	"Joey"	2:57
3.	"Inseparable"	2:26
4.	"I Can't Say No"	3:30
5.	"This Will Be (An Everlasting Love)"	2:50

Side two
No.	Title	Writer(s)	Length
6.	"Something for Nothing"		2:57
7.	"I Love Him So Much"		3:24
8.	"How Come You Won't Stay Here"		3:03
9.	"Your Face Stays in My Mind"		2:45
10.	"You"	Jackson, Yancy, Kay Butler	3:30

== Personnel ==
- Natalie Cole – vocals, backing vocals
- Chuck Jackson, Marvin Yancy, Richard Evans – arrangement
- Gloria Jones – backing vocals (5)

=== Production ===
- Larkin Arnold – executive producer, liner notes
- Chuck Jackson – producer
- Marvin Yancy – producer
- Roger Anfinsen – engineer (1–6)
- John Janus – engineer (1–6)
- Rich Adler – engineer (7–10)
- Bruce Swedien – engineer (7–10)
- Wally Traugott – mastering at Capitol Mastering (Hollywood, California)
- Roy Kohara – art direction
- David Alexander – photography
- Kevin Hunter – personal management
- Janice Williams – spiritual advisor

== Charts ==
Chart (1975)	Peak position
US Billboard 200	18
US Top R&B/Hip-Hop Albums (Billboard)	1

Singles

Year	Title	Peak position				
Year	Title	US	US R&B	US A/C	US Dance	UK
1975	"This Will Be"	6	1	45	5	32
1975	"Inseparable"	32	1	20	—	—

== Certifications ==
Region	Certification	Certified units/sales
United States (RIAA)	Gold	500,000^{^}
^{^} Shipments figures based on certification alone.

== See also ==
- List of number-one R&B albums of 1975 (U.S.)
