= Take a Look (Natalie Cole album) =

Studio album by Natalie Cole
- Released: June 9, 1993
- Recorded: 1992–93
- Studios: Ocean Way Recording, Capitol Studios and Conway Studios (Hollywood, California); Schnee Studios (North Hollywood, California); Westlake Studios (Los Angeles, California); O'Henry Sound Studios (Burbank, California); The Power Station (New York, New York)
- Genres: Jazz; traditional pop
- Length: 64:22
- Label: Elektra
- Producers: André Fischer; Tommy LiPuma

Natalie Cole chronology
Unforgettable... with Love (1991)	Take a Look (1993)	Holly & Ivy (1994)

Professional ratings
Review scores
Source	Rating
AllMusic	4.5/5 stars
Calgary Herald	B
Entertainment Weekly	B+
Music Week	3/5 stars
Philadelphia Inquirer	3/4 stars
Rolling Stone	4/5 stars

Take a Look is a 1993 album by American singer Natalie Cole, released on June 9, 1993, by Elektra Records. Cole won the Grammy Award for Best Jazz Vocal Performance for Take a Look at the 36th Grammy Awards.

The single, "Take a Look", peaked at No. 68 on the US Billboard R&B chart and No. 35 on the Adult Contemporary chart in 1993.

== Track listing ==
No.	Title	Writer(s)	Length
1.	"I Wish You Love"	Albert Beach; Charles Trenet	4:07
2.	"I'm Beginning to See the Light"	Duke Ellington; Don George; Johnny Hodges; Harry James	3:29
3.	"Swinging Shepherd Blues"	Natalie Cole; Kenny Jacobson; Moe Koffman; Rhoda Roberts	4:01
4.	"Crazy He Calls Me"	Bob Russell; Carl Sigman	4:11
5.	"Cry Me a River"	Arthur Hamilton	3:50
6.	"Undecided"	Sydney Robin; Charlie Shavers	2:15
7.	"Fiesta in Blue"	Count Basie; Louie Bellson; Roy Eldridge; Benny Goodman; Jimmy Mundy	4:03
8.	"I'm Gonna Laugh You Right out of My Life"	Cy Coleman; Joseph McCarthy	3:33
9.	"Let There Be Love"	Ian Grant; Lionel Rand	3:50
10.	"It's Sand, Man!"	Jon Hendricks; Dave Lambert; Ed Lewis	2:30
11.	"Don't Explain"	Arthur Herzog Jr.; Billie Holiday	3:10
12.	"As Time Goes By"	Herman Hupfeld	3:43
13.	"Too Close for Comfort"	Jerry Bock; Larry Holofcener; George David Weiss	2:56
14.	"Calypso Blues"	Nat King Cole; George	4:49
15.	"This Will Make You Laugh"	Irene Higginbotham	3:46
16.	"Lovers"	Cole; Chuck Jackson; Marvin Yancy	3:14
17.	"All About Love"	Robert Arthur; Bill Dana	3:39
18.	"Take a Look"	Cole; Naomi Neville; Clyde Otis	3:06
Total length:			64:22

== Personnel ==
=== Musicians ===
- Natalie Cole – vocals, backing vocals (5, 7, 10, 14, 16, 17)
- Roger Kellaway – acoustic piano (1, 5, 12)
- Alan Broadbent – acoustic piano (2, 3, 9, 10, 13–15, 17)
- Clare Fischer – acoustic piano (4)
- Mike Melvoin – acoustic piano (7, 16)
- Herbie Hancock – acoustic piano (8, 18), Fender Rhodes (11)
- John Chiodini – guitars, guitar solo (15)
- John Clayton – bass (1, 5, 7, 8, 11, 12, 16, 18)
- Jim Hughart – bass (2–4, 6, 9, 10, 13–15, 17)
- Jeff Hamilton – drums (1–8, 10–13, 16, 17)
- Harold Jones – drums (9, 15, 18)
- Luis Conte – percussion (14)
- Robert Yancy – percussion (14)
- Larry Bunker – marimba (14), vibraphone (14)
- Pete Christlieb – saxophone solo (2, 17)
- Grover Washington Jr. – saxophone solo (3)
- David "Fathead" Newman – saxophone solo (5, 12)
- David Trigg – trumpet solo (9)

Music arrangements

- Marty Paich – arrangements (1, 5, 12, 18)
- John Clayton – arrangements (2, 10, 13)
- Bill Holman – arrangements (3, 6, 17)
- Alan Broadbent – arrangements (4, 7, 15, 16)
- Jeremy Lubbock – arrangements (8, 11)
- Jim Hughart – arrangements (9)
- John Chiodini – arrangements (14)

=== Production ===
- Natalie Cole – executive producer
- Tommy LiPuma – executive producer, producer (1, 3, 5, 6, 12, 17, 18)
- André Fischer – producer (2, 4, 7–11, 13–16)
- Al Schmitt – recording, mixing
- Joe Ferla – additional recording
- Doug Ryder – additional recording
- Bill Schnee – additional recording
- Jeffrey "Woody" Woodruff – additional recording
- Chris Albert – assistant engineer
- Ken Allerdyce – assistant engineer
- Chris Fogel – assistant engineer
- John Hendrickson – assistant engineer
- Richard Landers – assistant engineer
- Gil Morales – assistant engineer
- Charlie Paakkari – assistant engineer
- Marnie Riley – assistant engineer
- Gary Sulich – assistant engineer
- Dan Wojnar – assistant engineer
- Doug Sax – mastering at The Mastering Lab (Hollywood, California)
- Angelo Montrone – production assistant (1, 3, 5, 6, 12, 17, 18)
- Deborah Silverman-Kern – production assistant (1, 3, 5, 6, 12, 17, 18)
- Patty Nichols – production assistant (2, 4, 7–11, 13–16)
- Keith Petrie – production assistant (2, 4, 7–11, 13–16)
- Shari Sutcliffe – project coordinator
- Robyn Lynch – art direction
- Drenttel Doyle Partners – design
- Matthew Rolston – photography
- Janet Zeitoun – hair
- Rudy Calvo – make-up
- Tara Posey – make-up
- Cecille Parker – stylist
- Dan Cleary – management

== Charts ==
Chart performance for Take a Look
Chart (1993)	Peak position
Australian Albums (ARIA)	50
German Albums (Offizielle Top 100)	90
New Zealand Albums (RMNZ)	36
Swedish Albums (Sverigetopplistan)	46
UK Albums (Official Charts)	16
US Billboard 200	26
US Top R&B/Hip-Hop Albums (Billboard)	14

== Certifications ==
Certifications for Take a Look
Region	Certification	Certified units/sales
Canada (Music Canada)	Gold	50,000^{^}
Germany (BVMI)	Gold	10,000^{^}
United States (RIAA)	Gold	500,000^{^}
^{^} Shipments figures based on certification alone.
