= Don't Look Back (Natalie Cole album) =

Studio album by Natalie Cole
- Released: May 15, 1980
- Recorded: 1979–80
- Studio: Scott/Sunstorm (Hollywood); United Western (Hollywood)
- Genre: R&B; soul
- Label: Capitol
- Producer: Marvin Yancy; Gene Barge; Michael Masser

Natalie Cole chronology
We're the Best of Friends (1979)	Don't Look Back (1980)	Happy Love (1981)

Professional ratings
Review scores
Source	Rating
AllMusic	2/5 stars

Don't Look Back is a 1980 album by American singer Natalie Cole. Released on May 15, 1980, by Capitol Records, The album reached peak positions of number 77 on the Billboard 200; number 17 on Billboard's R&B Albums chart.

The album spawned one Top 40 single, "Someone That I Used to Love," which reached number 21 on the U.S. Billboard Hot 100 and spent five months on the charts. It also peaked at number three on the Adult Contemporary chart.

== Track listing ==
1. "Don't Look Back" (Fred Allen, Marvin Yancy, Natalie Cole) - 4:08
2. "(I've Seen) Paradise" (Marvin Yancy, Natalie Cole) - 4:31
3. "Hold On" (Kevin Yancy, Marvin Yancy, Natalie Cole) - 4:50
4. "Stairway to the Stars" (Frank Signorelli, Matty Malneck, Mitchell Parish) - 3:08
5. "I'm Getting Into You" (Chuck Bynum, Marvin Yancy, Natalie Cole) - 3:57
6. "Someone That I Used to Love" (Gerry Goffin, Michael Masser) - 4:05
7. "Danger Up Ahead" (Natalie Cole) - 6:30
8. "Beautiful Dreamer" (Natalie Cole) - 4:10
9. "Cole Blooded" (Gene Barge, Natalie Cole) - 4:56

== Personnel ==
Musicians and vocalists

- Natalie Cole – lead vocals, keyboards (8)
- Linda Williams – keyboards (1–3, 7), acoustic piano (5)
- Marvin Yancy – keyboards (1–3, 7, 9)
- Michael Masser – keyboards (6)
- Chuck Brynum – guitars (1, 5, 9)
- Michael Clinco – guitars (4)
- Steve Hunter – guitars (7)
- Larry Ball – bass (1–5, 7–9)
- Leland Sklar – bass (6)
- James Gadson – drums (1–3, 5, 7–9)
- Norm Jeffries – drums (4)
- Rick Shlosser – drums (6)
- Gene Barge – alto sax solo (3)
- Jackie Kelso – alto saxophone (4)
- Marshall Royal – alto saxophone (4)
- Bill Green – baritone saxophone (4)
- Curtis Amy – tenor saxophone (4)
- Ernie Watts – tenor saxophone (4)
- George Bohanon – trombone (4)
- Garnett Brown – trombone (4)
- Robert Payne – trombone (4)
- Christopher Riddle – trombone (4)
- Oscar Brashear – trumpet (4)
- Bobby Bryant – trumpet (4)
- Chuck Findley – trumpet (4)
- John Fresco – music contractor (4)
- Anita Anderson – backing vocals
- The Colettes – backing vocals
- The "N" Sisters – backing vocals

Music arrangements

- Gene Barge – arrangements (1–3, 5, 7–9), rhythm arrangements (1–3, 9)
- Marvin Yancy – rhythm arrangements (1–3, 5)
- Nelson Riddle – arrangements (4)
- Chuck Brynum – rhythm arrangements (5)
- Lee Holdridge – orchestral arrangements (6)
- Michael Masser – rhythm arrangements (6)
- Larry Ball – rhythm arrangements (7)
- Natalie Cole – rhythm arrangements (8)

== Production ==
- Gene Barge – producer (1–5, 7-9)
- Marvin Yancy – producer (1–5, 7-9)
- Michael Masser – producer (6)
- Gerry Brown – remixing, chief engineer (1–3, 5–9)
- Paul Dobbe – chief engineer (4)
- Reggie Dozier – assistant engineer (1–3, 5–9)
- Jerry Hall – assistant engineer (1–3, 5–9)
- Rick Surber – assistant engineer (1–3, 5–9)
- David Ahlert – assistant engineer (4)
- Wally Traugott – mastering at Capitol Studios (Hollywood, California)
- Chuck Brynum – production assistant
- Melissa Tormé-March – album coordinator
- Glen Christensen – art direction, design
- Vincent Hughes Frye – personality photography
- Georgina Karvellas – still life photography
- Emory Jones – hair stylist
- Sir Lord Donl – make-up
- Janice Williams – spiritual advisor
- Kevin Hunter for New Direction – management

== Charts ==
Chart (1980)	Peak position
US Billboard 200	77
US Top R&B/Hip-Hop Albums (Billboard)	17

Singles

Year	Title	Peak position		
Year	Title	US	US R&B	US A/C
1980	"Someone That I Used to Love"	21	21	3
1980	"Hold On"	—	38	—
