= Miss You like Crazy =

1989 single by Natalie Cole

"Miss You Like Crazy"

Single by Natalie Cole

from the album Good to Be Back
- B-side: "Good to Be Back"
- Released: March 15, 1989
- Genre: Pop; R&B
- Length: 3:56
- Label: EMI USA
- Songwriters: Gerry Goffin; Michael Masser; Preston Glass
- Producer: Michael Masser

Natalie Cole singles chronology
"I Live for Your Love" (1988)	"Miss You Like Crazy" (1989)	"I Do" (1989)

Music video
- "Miss You Like Crazy" on YouTube

"Miss You Like Crazy" is a song by American singer Natalie Cole, released as the lead single on March 15, 1989, from her album Good to Be Back (1989).

== Critical reception ==
Jerry Smith from Music Week complimented the song as a "strong, sweeping ballad, where her soaring vocal talents are amply displayed among Michael Masser's dramatic and highly polished production." Colin Irwin from Number One wrote, "'Miss You Like Crazy' is an immaculate pop record – shades of Donna Summer's alliance with S/A/W – and fully deserves its success."

== Chart performance ==
"Miss You Like Crazy" was a hit for Cole, becoming her fifth and last top-10 hit on the US Billboard Hot 100 chart when it peaked at number seven. The song topped both the Billboard Hot Black Singles and Adult Contemporary charts in 1989, as well as reaching number two on the UK Singles Chart, becoming the biggest hit of her career there. In Canada, the song peaked at number 19 for two weeks. "Miss You Like Crazy" is ranked as the 67th-biggest US hit of 1989 and the 20th-biggest UK hit, being certified silver in the latter region.

== Charts ==
=== Weekly charts ===
Chart (1989)	Peak position
Australia (ARIA)	34
Belgium (Ultratop 50 Flanders)	11
Canada Top Singles (RPM)	19
Canada Adult Contemporary (RPM)	16
Europe (Eurochart Hot 100)	8
Ireland (IRMA)	4
Italy Airplay (Music & Media)	6
Netherlands (Dutch Top 40)	18
Netherlands (Single Top 100)	13
New Zealand (Recorded Music NZ)	40
UK Singles (Official Charts)	2
US Billboard Hot 100	7
US Adult Contemporary (Billboard)	1
US Hot R&B/Hip-Hop Songs (Billboard)	1
US Cash Box Top 100	8
Venezuela (UPI)	7
West Germany (GfK)	22

=== Year-end charts ===
Chart (1989)	Position
Australia (ARIA)	97
Belgium (Ultratop)	80
Europe (Eurochart Hot 100)	73
UK Singles (OCC)	20
US Billboard Hot 100	67
US Adult Contemporary (Billboard)	9
US Hot Black Singles (Billboard)	67

== Certifications ==
Region	Certification	Certified units/sales
United Kingdom (BPI)	Silver	200,000^{^}
^{^} Shipments figures based on certification alone.

== Release history ==
Region	Date	Format(s)	Label(s)	Ref.
United States	March 15, 1989	7-inch vinyl; cassette	EMI USA	
United Kingdom	April 3, 1989	7-inch vinyl; 12-inch vinyl; CD	EMI USA	
