= Unforgettable... with Love =

Studio album by Natalie Cole
- Released: June 11, 1991
- Recorded: 1989; November 1990 – April 1991
- Studios: Pacifique, North Hollywood, California
- Genres: Traditional pop; jazz
- Length: 72:47
- Label: Elektra
- Producers: André Fischer; David Foster; Tommy LiPuma

Natalie Cole chronology
Good to Be Back (1989)	Unforgettable... with Love (1991)	Take a Look (1993)

Singles from Unforgettable... with Love
- 1. "Unforgettable" Released: June 10, 1991; 2. "The Very Thought of You" Released: 1992

Professional ratings
Review scores
Source	Rating
AllMusic	4/5 stars
Calgary Herald	B−
Chicago Tribune	3.5/4 stars
Robert Christgau	(dud)
Entertainment Weekly	B+
The Windsor Star	A

"Unforgettable"
Natalie Cole and Nat King Cole's "Unforgettable" duet from Unforgettable… with Love

Unforgettable ... with Love, also known as simply Unforgettable, is the twelfth studio album by American singer Natalie Cole. Released on June 11, 1991, the album includes covers of standards previously performed by her father, Nat King Cole. It was also her debut for Elektra Records, after being given her release from EMI Records.

== Background ==
The record was very successful in the pop, jazz, and R&B markets and was considered the major comeback recording that had been brewing since Cole's late 1980s releases. The album was certified 7× platinum as of 2009 by the RIAA. The album won the 1992 Grammy Awards for Album of the Year and Best Engineered – Non-Classical, while the track "Unforgettable" (duet with her father Nat King Cole) won three additional Grammys: Record of the Year, Traditional Pop Vocal Performance, and Arrangement Accompanying Vocals. The album also won Soul Train Music Award for Best R&B/Soul Album, Female the same year.

Two albums prior to this one (1987's Everlasting and 1989's Good to Be Back) also moved to Elektra after Cole signed with the label. Her uncle Ike Cole plays piano on the album.

As of 2016 the album has sold 6.2 million copies in the United States according to Nielsen Music.

== Track listing ==
No.	Title	Producer(s)	Length
1.	"The Very Thought of You"	André Fischer	4:14
2.	"Paper Moon"	Tommy LiPuma	3:24
3.	"Route 66"	Fischer	3:00
4.	"Mona Lisa"	David Foster	3:45
5.	"L-O-V-E"	Fischer	2:32
6.	"This Can't Be Love"	Fischer	2:13
7.	"Smile"	Fischer	3:37
8.	"Lush Life"	Foster	4:20
9.	"That Sunday That Summer"	Foster	3:31
10.	"Orange Colored Sky"	LiPuma	2:36
11.	"Medley: "For Sentimental Reasons" / "Tenderly" / "Autumn Leaves"	William Best; Walter Gross; Joseph Kosma	7:26
12.	"Straighten Up and Fly Right"	Fischer	2:40
13.	"Avalon"	Foster	1:51
14.	"Don't Get Around Much Anymore"	Fischer	2:34
15.	"Too Young"	Foster	4:32
16.	"Nature Boy"	Fischer	3:23
17.	"Darling, Je Vous Aime Beaucoup"	Fischer	3:24
18.	"Almost Like Being in Love"	Foster	2:11
19.	"Thou Swell"	Fischer	1:50
20.	"Non Dimenticar"	LiPuma	2:56
21.	"Our Love Is Here to Stay"	Fischer	3:28
22.	"Unforgettable" (duet with Nat King Cole)	Foster	3:29
Total length:			72:47

2022 30th Anniversary Edition bonus tracks
No.	Title	Producer(s)	Length
23.	"At Last"	Foster	3:32
24.	"A Cottage for Sale"	Foster	2:42

== Personnel ==
Adapted from AllMusic.

- Murray Adler – violin
- Anas Alaf – assistant engineer, engineer
- Monty Alexander – piano
- Israel Baker – violin
- Marilyn Baker – violin
- Rick Baptist – trumpet
- Kevin Becka – assistant engineer, engineer
- Arnold Belnick – violin
- Pete Beltran – trombone
- Dixie Blackstone – violin
- Ray Blair – assistant engineer, engineer
- Samuel Boghossian – viola
- George Bohanon – trombone
- Tom Boyd – oboe
- Jacqueline Brand – violin
- Oscar Brashear – trumpet
- Alan Broadbent – celeste, piano
- Ray Brown – arranger, bass guitar
- Terry Brown – assistant engineer, engineer
- John Bruno – assistant engineer, engineer
- Dennis Budimir – guitar
- Denyse Buffum – viola
- Larry Bunker – percussion
- Jodi Burnett – cello
- Ralph Burns – arranger
- Kenneth Burward-hoy – viola
- Darius Campo – violin
- Conte Candoli – trumpet
- Stuart Canin – violin
- Maurice Cevrero – copyist
- Lily Ho Chen – violin
- John Chiodini – guitar
- Pete Christlieb – tenor saxophone, saxophone, woodwind
- Gene Cipriano – oboe, woodwind
- John Clayton – bass guitar, string bass
- Pat Coil – synthesizer
- Brad Cole – piano
- Ike Cole – piano
- Natalie Cole – arranger, vocal arrangement, vocals
- John Collins – guitar
- Antony Cooke – cello
- Ronald Cooper – cello
- Jim Cowger – copyist
- Gail Cruz – violin
- Peter Darmi – engineer
- Isabelle Daskoff – violin
- Donna Davidson – background vocals
- Charlie Davis – trumpet
- Vincent DeRosa – French horn
- Chuck Domanico – bass, string bass
- Bonnie Douglas – violin
- Assa Drori – violin
- David Duke – French horn
- Bruce Dukov – violin
- Bob Efford – baritone saxophone
- Stephen Erdody – cello
- Joseph Estren – copyist
- Pavel Farkas – violin
- Henry Ferber – violin
- Michael Ferril – violin
- Elizabeth Finch – copyist
- Chuck Findley – trumpet
- André Fischer – arranger, producer
- Clare Fischer – arranger, piano, rhythm arrangements
- Ronald Folsom – violin
- David Foster – producer
- Gary Foster – flute, alto saxophone, woodwind
- William Francis – copyist
- Jack Furlong – copyist
- Armen Garabedian – violin
- Berj Garabedian – violin
- Tom Garvin – synthesizer
- James Getzoff – violin
- Julie Gigante – violin
- Harris Goldman – violin
- Pamela Goldsmith – viola
- Ron Gorow – copyist
- Endre Granat – violin
- Gary Grant – trumpet
- Thurman Green – trombone
- Susan Greenberg – flute
- Ralph Grierson – synthesizer
- Sol Gubin – drums
- Debbie Hall – background vocals
- Larry Hall – trumpet
- Diana Halprin – violin
- Jeff Hamilton – drums
- Clayton Haslop – violin
- Fred Hayman – clothing/wardrobe, wardrobe
- Dan Higgins – alto saxophone, soprano saxophone
- Paula Hochhalter – cello
- Bill Holman – arranger
- Steve Huffsteter – trumpet
- Jim Hughart – bass guitar
- Bill Hughes – copyist
- George Hurrell – photography
- John Johnson – tuba
- John Thomas Johnson – tuba
- Marilyn L. Johnson – French horn
- Thomas "Snake" Johnson – trombone
- Harold Jones – drums
- Jeffrey Jones – copyist
- Karen Jones – violin
- Jerry Jordan – assistant engineer, engineer
- Nathan Kaproff – violin
- Anne Karam – cello
- Dennis Karmazyn – cello
- Armand Karpoff – cello
- Suzie Katayama – copyist
- Roland Kato – viola
- Kerry Katz – background vocals
- Randy Kerber – synthesizer
- Myra Kestenbaum – viola
- Katie Kirkpatrick – harp
- Ezra Kliger – violin
- Armen Ksadjikian – cello
- Steve Kujala – woodwind
- Bernard Kundell – violin
- Michael Lang – piano
- Ronnie Lang – woodwind
- Ronald Langinger – flute
- Tim Lauber – assistant engineer, engineer
- Michel Legrand – arranger, orchestral arrangements
- Pierre Leloup – linguist
- Kathleen Lenski – violin
- Brian Leonard – violin
- Gayle Levant – harp
- Berwyn Linton – copyist
- Tommy LiPuma – producer, rhythm arrangements
- Rich Logan – background vocals
- Randy Long – assistant engineer, engineer
- Charles Loper – trombone
- Warren Luening – trumpet
- Arthur Maebe – French horn
- Johnny Mandel – adaptation, arranger, orchestral arrangements
- Rene Mandel – violin
- Edith Markman – violin
- Michael Markman – violin
- Margaret Maryatt – copyist
- Yoko Matsuda – violin
- Donald McInnes – viola
- Mike Melvoin – piano
- Don Menza – tenor saxophone
- Gene Merlino – background vocals
- Dwight Mikkelsen – copyist
- Deborah Mitchell – copyist
- Richard Mitchell – tenor saxophone
- Rick Mitchell – tenor saxophone
- Lanny Morgan – alto saxophone
- Ralph Morrison III – violin
- Carole Mukogawa – viola
- Richard Taylor "Dick" Nash – trombone
- Buell Neidlinger – string bass
- Dan Neufeld – viola
- Irma Neumann – violin
- David "Fathead" Newman – guest artist, tenor saxophone
- Jack Nimitz – baritone saxophone, woodwind
- Mike Nowack – viola
- Brian O'Connor – French horn
- Nils Oliver – cello
- Sid Page – violin
- Marty Paich – arranger, orchestral arrangements, rhythm arrangements
- Cecille Parker – stylist
- Doyle Partners – design
- John Patitucci – bass guitar
- Bruce Paulson – trombone
- Bill Perkins – alto saxophone
- John Pisano – guitar
- Kazi Pitelka – viola
- Stanley Plummer – violin
- Barbara Porter – violin
- Tara Posey – make-up
- Jack Redmond – trombone
- Bill Reichenbach Jr. – trombone
- Dave Reitzas – assistant engineer, engineer, mixing, mixing assistant
- Dorothy Remsen – harp
- Chris Rich – assistant engineer, engineer
- Nelson Riddle – arranger
- Marnie Riley – assistant engineer, engineer
- Rail Jon Rogut – assistant engineer, engineer
- Anatoly Rosinsky – violin
- Daniel Rothmuller – cello
- Doug Saks – mastering
- Joe Sample – guest artist, piano
- Myron Sandler – viola
- Al Schmitt – engineer, mixing
- Frederick Seykora – cello
- Sid Sharp – violin
- Don Shelton – background vocals
- Harry Shirinian – viola
- Haim Shtrum – violin
- Paul Shure – violin
- Andy Simpkins – bass guitar
- Nolan Andrew Smith – trumpet
- Valerie Smith – linguist
- Armin Steiner – engineer
- Sally Stevens – background vocals
- Susan Stevens – background vocals
- David Stockhammer – viola
- Sheridon Stokes – woodwind
- Robert Stone – string bass
- Margaret Storer – string bass
- Shari Sutcliffe – project coordinator
- Frank Szabo – trumpet
- James Thatcher – French horn
- Milton Thomas – viola
- Raymond Tischer – viola, violin
- Richard Todd – French horn
- Roy Trakin – liner notes
- Alexander Treger – violin
- Bob Tricarico – baritone saxophone
- Mari Tsumura-botnick – violin
- Louise di Tullio – flute, woodwind
- Jo Ann Turovsky – harp
- Alan de Veritch – viola
- Gerald Vinci – violin
- Al Viola – guitar
- Dorothy Wade – violin
- Brad Wanaar – French horn
- Miwako Watanabe – violin
- Dave Weckl – drums
- Michelle Winding – assistant, assistant producer
- Rick Winquest – assistant engineer, engineer
- Joey Wolpert – engineer
- Jeffrey "Woody" Woodruff – engineer
- Woody Woodruff – engineer
- Ken Yerke – violin
- Janet Zeitoun – hair stylist

== Charts ==
=== Weekly charts ===
Weekly chart performance for Unforgettable... with Love
Chart (1991–1992)	Peak position
Australian Albums (ARIA)	1
Canada Top Albums/CDs (RPM)	1
Dutch Albums (Album Top 100)	19
European Albums (Music & Media)	17
Finnish Albums (Suomen virallinen lista)	32
French Albums (SNEP)	37
German Albums (Offizielle Top 100)	32
Italian Albums (Musica e dischi)	5
New Zealand Albums (RMNZ)	1
Norwegian Albums (VG-lista)	9
Portuguese Albums (AFP)	9
Swedish Albums (Sverigetopplistan)	18
Swiss Albums (Schweizer Hitparade)	15
UK Albums (Official Charts)	11
US Billboard 200	1
US Top Jazz Albums (Billboard)	8
US Top R&B/Hip-Hop Albums (Billboard)	5

=== Year-end charts ===
1991 year-end chart performance for Unforgettable... with Love
Chart (1991)	Position
Australian Albums (ARIA)	4
Canada Top Albums/CDs (RPM)	5
New Zealand Albums (RMNZ)	5
US Billboard 200	24
US Top Jazz Albums (Billboard)	3
US Top R&B/Hip-Hop Albums (Billboard)	44

1992 year-end chart performance for Unforgettable... with Love
Chart (1992)	Position
Canada Top Albums/CDs (RPM)	64
European Albums (Music & Media)	90
US Billboard 200	18
US Top Jazz Albums (Billboard)	9

=== Decade-end charts ===
Decade-end chart performance for Unforgettable... with Love
Chart (1990–1999)	Position
US Billboard 200	47

== Certifications and sales ==
Region	Certification	Certified units/sales
Argentina (CAPIF)	Gold	30,000^{^}
Australia (ARIA)	5× Platinum	350,000^{^}
Brazil (Pro-Música Brasil)	Gold	100,000^{*}
Canada (Music Canada)	4× Platinum	400,000^{^}
France	—	120,000
Italy (FIMI)	Gold	200,000
Japan (RIAJ)	Platinum	200,000^{^}
Netherlands (NVPI)	Gold	50,000^{^}
New Zealand (RMNZ)	Platinum	15,000^{^}
Spain (Promusicae)	Platinum	100,000^{^}
Switzerland (IFPI Switzerland)	Gold	25,000^{^}
United Kingdom (BPI)	Gold	100,000^{^}
United States (RIAA)	7× Platinum	7,230,000
Summaries
Worldwide	—	11,000,000
^{*} Sales figures based on certification alone.^{^} Shipments figures based on certification alone.
