= I've Got Love on My Mind =

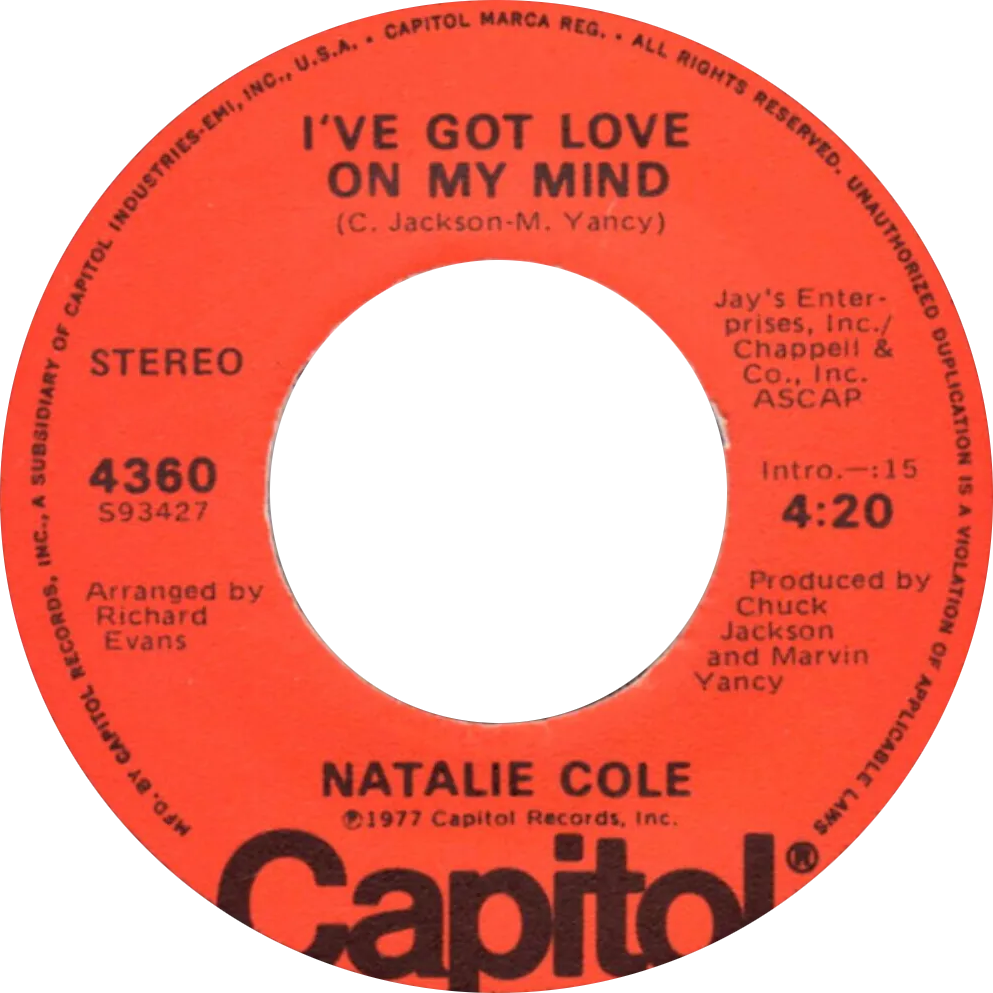
- A-side label of the US single

Single by Natalie Cole

from the album Unpredictable
- B-side: "Unpredictable You"
- Released: January 22, 1977
- Recorded: 1976
- Genre: R&B; soul
- Length: 4:20
- Label: Capitol
- Songwriters: Chuck Jackson; Marvin Yancy
- Producers: Chuck Jackson; Marvin Yancy

Natalie Cole singles chronology
"Mr. Melody" (1976)	"I've Got Love on My Mind" (1977)	"Party Lights" (1977)

"I've Got Love on My Mind" is a 1977 R&B/soul song originally recorded by American singer Natalie Cole. Released from her third album, Unpredictable, it was certified Gold, selling over one million copies and has become one of her most successful and popular songs.

== Charts ==
"I've Got Love on My Mind" spent five weeks at number one on the Hot Soul Singles chart and peaked at number five on the Billboard Hot 100 in 1977.

=== Weekly charts ===
Chart (1977)	Peak position
Canada RPM	5
New Zealand	22
U.S. Billboard Hot 100	5
U.S. Billboard Easy Listening	45
U.S. Billboard Hot Soul Singles	1
U.S. Cash Box Top 100	3

=== Year-end charts ===
Chart (1977)	Rank
Canada	66
U.S. Billboard Hot 100	35
U.S. Cash Box	22

== Certifications ==
Region	Certification	Certified units/sales
United States (RIAA)	Gold	1,000,000^{^}
^{^} Shipments figures based on certification alone.
