= Inseparable (song) =

- Side A for US vinyl single

Single by Natalie Cole

from the album Inseparable
- B-side: "How Come You Won't Stay Here"
- Released: November 14, 1975
- Genre: Soul
- Length: 2:26
- Label: Capitol
- Songwriters: Chuck Jackson, Marvin Yancy
- Producers: Chuck Jackson, Marvin Yancy

Natalie Cole singles chronology
"This Will Be (An Everlasting Love)" (1975)	"Inseparable" (1975)	"Sophisticated Lady (She's a Different Lady)" (1976)

"Inseparable" is a 1975 Soul song originally recorded by American singer Natalie Cole. Released in November 1975, it was her second straight number one single on the Hot Soul Singles chart, from her debut album of the same name, and also reached number thirty-two on the Billboard Hot 100 Singles chart.

== Chart history ==
Chart (1975–76)	Peak position
Canada RPM Top Singles	49
U.S. Billboard Hot 100	32
U.S. Billboard Hot Soul Singles	1
U.S. Billboard Easy Listening	20
