= Sophisticated Lady (She's a Different Lady) =

Single by Natalie Cole

from the album Natalie
- B-side: "Good Morning Heartache"
- Released: April 12, 1976
- Genre: R&B, soul
- Length: 3:27
- Label: Capitol
- Songwriter(s): Chuck Jackson, Marvin Yancy, Natalie Cole
- Producer(s): Chuck Jackson, Marvin Yancy, Gene Barge, Richard Evans

Natalie Cole singles chronology
| "Inseparable" (1975) | "Sophisticated Lady (She's a Different Lady)" (1976) | "Mr. Melody" (1976) |

"Sophisticated Lady (She's a Different Lady)" is a 1976 R&B/Soul song recorded by American singer Natalie Cole issued as lead single from her second album Natalie. The song won Cole a second consecutive Grammy Award for Best Female R&B Vocal Performance.

== Background ==
"Sophisticated Lady" provided Cole with a Top Ten hit in both Italy and New Zealand with respective peaks of #8 and #4; "Sophisticated Lady..." would remain Cole's only Top 20 hit in Italy and also her highest charting single in New Zealand although in 1988 "Pink Cadillac" would also reach #4 NZ.

== Chart positions ==
It spent one week at #1 on the Hot Soul Singles charts in 1976, and was Cole's third consecutive #1 soul hit. "Sophisticated Lady..." would not be one of Cole's biggest US Pop hits, rising no higher than #25 on the Billboard Hot 100;

| Charts | Peak position |
|---|---|
| U.S. Billboard Hot 100 | 25 |
| U.S. Billboard Hot Soul Singles | 1 |
