= This Will Be =

Single by Natalie Cole

from the album Inseparable
- B-side: "Joey"
- Released: June 1975
- Genre: Soul; pop
- Length: 2:51
- Label: Capitol
- Songwriters: Chuck Jackson; Marvin Yancy
- Producers: Chuck Jackson; Marvin Yancy

Natalie Cole singles chronology
"This Will Be" (1975)	"Inseparable" (1975)

Official audio
- "This Will Be (An Everlasting Love)" (2003 Remaster) on YouTube

"This Will Be" (also titled "This Will Be (An Everlasting Love)") is a song written by Chuck Jackson and Marvin Yancy, arranged by Richard Evans and performed by American singer Natalie Cole. Often appended with "(An Everlasting Love)" but not released as such, this was Cole's debut single, released in April 1975 and one of her biggest hits, becoming a number-one R&B and number-six pop smash in the United States, also reaching the UK Top 40. Cole won a Grammy Award for Best Female R&B Vocal Performance, a category that had previously been dominated by Aretha Franklin. It would also help her win the Grammy Award for Best New Artist.

Having been repeatedly rejected by other record companies, Cole sent demos to Larkin Arnold, CEO of Capitol Records, who agreed to release the song. Jackson and Yancy had written the song at the end of sessions for Arnold, just as he and Cole were about to leave town.

== In popular culture ==
The song has featured in several films:

- While You Were Sleeping (1995)
- The Parent Trap (1998) (end title)
- Charlie's Angels: Full Throttle (2003)
- A Cinderella Story (2004)
- Taxi (2004)
- Bride Wars (2009)

It was featured in an episode of the South Korean television show, Coffee Prince in 2007.

In 2012, the song was also used in the "Lip Sync for Your Life" segment of the third episode of the fourth season of the reality competition series RuPaul's Drag Race, which also featured Cole as a guest judge. Contestant DiDa Ritz's performance of the song has since been acclaimed as one of the best in the show's history and received admiration from Cole herself.

== Charts ==
=== Weekly charts ===
Chart (1975)	Peak position
Australia Kent Music Report	28
Canada RPM Top Singles	12
Netherlands	18
South Africa (Springbok)	18
UK Singles Chart (OCC)	32
U.S. Billboard Hot 100	6
U.S. Billboard Hot Soul Singles	1
U.S. Billboard Dance/Disco	5
U.S. Billboard Easy Listening	45
U.S. Cash Box Top 100	9

=== Year-end charts ===
Chart (1975)	Rank
Canada	99
US Cash Box	60

== Certifications ==
Region	Certification	Certified units/sales
New Zealand (RMNZ)	Platinum	30,000^{‡}
United Kingdom (BPI)	Platinum	600,000^{‡}
^{‡} Sales+streaming figures based on certification alone.
