= Eddie Cole (musician) =

American jazz musician (1910–1970)

- Born: Edward Bennett Coles; October 29, 1910; Montgomery, Alabama, U.S.
- Died: June 18, 1970 (aged 59) Los Angeles, California, U.S.
- Occupation: Musician
- Instruments: Bass; piano; vocals

Edward Bennett Coles (October 29, 1910 – June 18, 1970), known professionally as Eddie Cole, was an American jazz musician and brother to musicians Nat King Cole, Freddy Cole, and Ike Cole.

== Biography ==
Eddie Cole was born to Rev. Edward J. and Perlina (née Adams) Coles in Montgomery, Alabama, on October 29, 1910. He was the second oldest of ten children and the oldest son. His brothers Nat King Cole (1919–1965), Ike (1927–2001), and Freddy (1931–2020) also each pursued careers in music. He studied both piano and bass from a young age and formed his first band at age 17. Three years later at age 20, he joined Noble Sissle's band the Sizzling Syncopators, staying there six years and performing with greats such as Sidney Bechet and Clarence Brereton.

He married Thelma Madison in Detroit, Michigan, in 1933 but later married actress Betty King. After a tour of Europe in 1936, Cole left Sissle's band to join Nat Cole's group, the Rogues of Rhythm. He appeared in the TV show Bourbon Street Beat in 1959 and later appeared on The Law and Mr. Jones and The Jack Benny Program.

He retired in the 1960s, and died on June 18, 1970, at the age of 59.
