= Marvin Yancy =

American musician (1950–1985)

- Born: Marvin Jerome Yancy; May 31, 1950; Chicago, Illinois, U.S.
- Died: March 22, 1985 (aged 34) Chicago, Illinois, U.S.
- Genres: Christian R&B; Gospel; Traditional black gospel; Contemporary R&B; Urban contemporary gospel
- Occupations: Singer-songwriter; record producer; pastor
- Instrument: Vocals
- Years active: 1971–1985
- Label: Nashboro
- Formerly of: The Independents

Marvin Jerome Yancy (May 31, 1950 – March 22, 1985) was an American gospel musician, pastor and Grammy-winning record producer, and former pastor of Fountain of Life Baptist Church. He started his music career, in 1971, with The Independents, who were an American R&B vocal group. His lone solo album, Heavy Load, was released on January 1, 1985, by Nashboro Records, and it placed at No. 4 on the Billboard magazine Gospel Albums chart.

== Early life ==
Yancy was born on May 31, 1950, in Chicago, Illinois, as Marvin Jerome Yancy, to Reverend Robert Yancy Sr., who was the pastor of Fountain of Life Baptist Church, at the time of his death in 1977, and his mother, Anne. This was when Marvin stepped into the pastoral role of the church that he led until his death. Yancy was a graduate of Cooley Vocational High School and went on to graduate from Moody Bible Institute along with The Chicago Bible Institute. Yancy was one of twelve siblings: he was one of eight brothers, Robert Jr., Kevin, Derrick, Sherwin, Stevie, Darrel, Melvin and Terry, along with four sisters that were in his family, Geraldine, Faye, Judith and Linda.

== Music career ==
He began his music career in 1971, with The Independents, who were an American R&B vocal group. The band disbanded in 1975, and he focused more on helping his spouse Natalie Cole, with recording and writing songs as her record producer. This was a powerful musical union because she won Grammy Awards for two songs, and they were in the category of Best Female R&B Vocal Performance at the 18th Annual Awards in 1976 for the song, "This Will Be (An Everlasting Love)", and the following year in 1977 at the 19th Annual Awards for the song, "Sophisticated Lady (She's a Different Lady)". His only solo release, Heavy Load, was released on January 1, 1985, by Nashboro Records, and this placed at No. 4 on the Billboard magazine Gospel Albums.

== Personal life ==
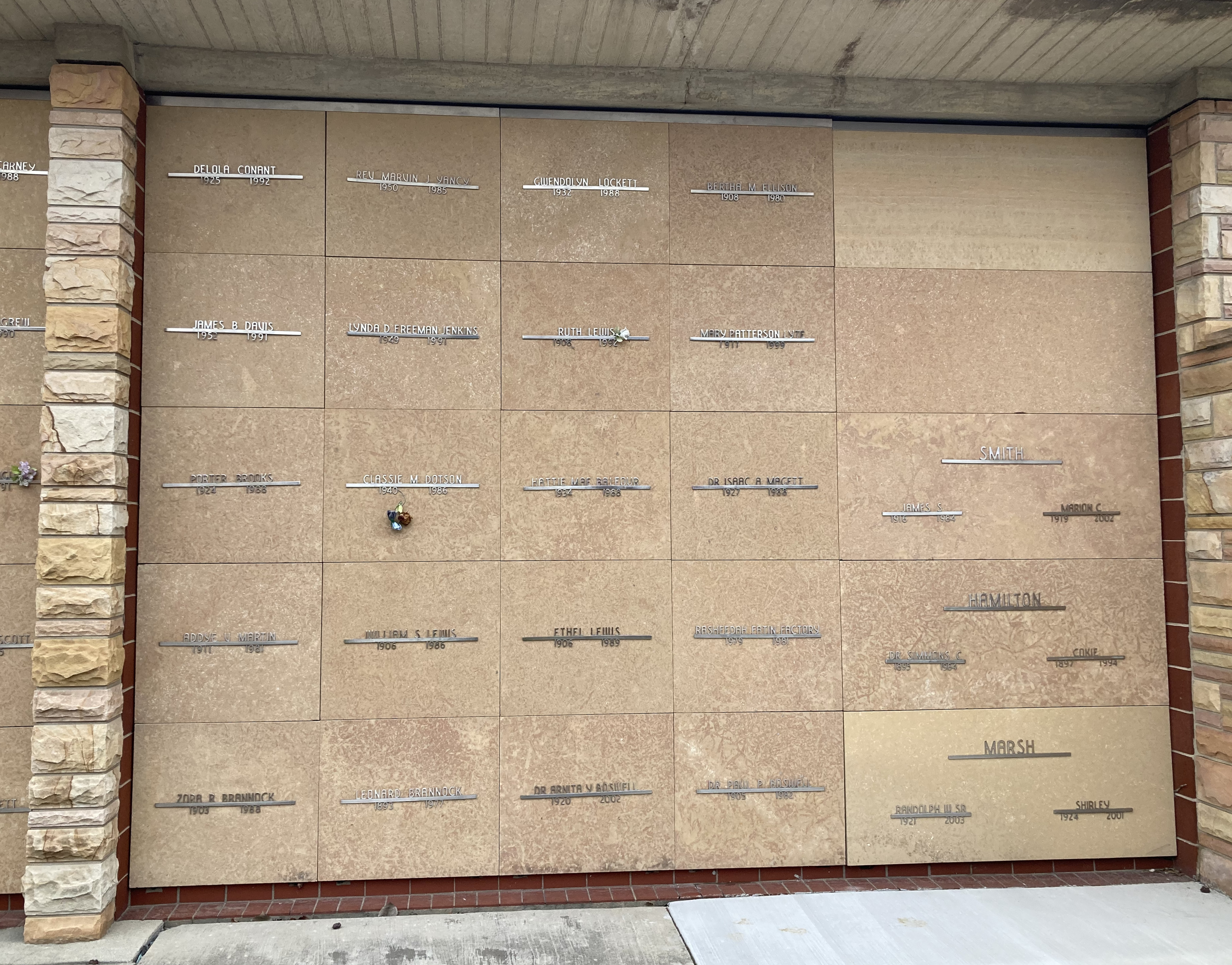
Yancy's grave (top row, second from left) at Lincoln Cemetery

Yancy's first marriage was to Natalie Cole on July 31, 1976. They had a son together, Robert Adam "Robbie" Yancy, who was born on October 14, 1977, but this marriage ended in divorce in 1980. He was married a second time in 1983, to Saundra Renaire Mays, who was in the choir of his church at the time. He had one child from this marriage, a daughter Brandy Raquel Yancy. Also from a previous relationship, he had a son named Marvin Jerome Yancy Jr.

Marvin Sr. suffered a minor stroke a month before his death from a heart attack on March 22, 1985, in Chicago, Illinois. He was buried at Lincoln Cemetery in Blue Island.

== Discography ==
List of selected studio albums, with selected chart positions
Title	Album details	Peak chart positions
Title	Album details	US Gos
Heavy Load	Released: January 1, 1985; Label: Nashboro; CD, digital download	4
