= Eber (disambiguation) =

Eber is an ancestor of the Israelites and the Ishmaelites in the Hebrew Bible.

Eber may also refer to:

== Given name ==
- Eber ben Pethahiah (fl. 18th century), Moravian Jewish scholar
- Eber Baker (1780–1864), American politician
- Éber Bessa (born 1992), Brazilian footballer
- Eber Bunker (1761–1836), American sea captain and pastoralist
- E. W. Cave (1831–1904), American journalist, civic promoter and politician, Secretary of State of Texas (1859–1861)
- Eber Finn, a legendary early Irish king
- Eber Phelps (born 1951), American politician
- Eber F. Piers (1889–1961), American architect
- Eber Hampton, Chickasaw academic and public figure
- Eber D. Howe (1798–1885), American journalist
- Eber Sanhueza (born 1998), Chilean rower
- Eber Simpson (1863–1919), American businessman and politician
- Eber Solís (born 1984), Argentine politician

== Surname ==
- Dorothy Harley Eber (1925-2022), British-born Canadian author
- Irene Eber (1929-2019), Israeli orientalist
- John W. Eber (1895–?), American politician in the 1920s
- Paul Eber (1511 – 1569), German Lutheran theologian, reformer and hymnwriter
- Rick Eber (born 1945), American gridiron footballer
- Robert Eber, American sound engineer

== Places ==
- Eber, Ohio, United States, an unincorporated community
- Eber, Çay, Turkey, a village
- Lake Eber, Turkey, a fresh water lake

== Other ==
- EBER, proteins and RNA found in the Epstein-Barr virus
- SMS Eber, two ships of the Imperial German Navy
- Eber, a programme exploring tank improvements - see Leopard 1

== See also ==
- Éber Donn or Donn, a god in Irish mythology
- Ebers, a surname
- Heber (disambiguation)
