= Melvilasom =

- Theatrical poster
- Directed by: Madhav Ramadasan
- Screenplay by: Soorya Krishna Moorthy
- Based on: Melvilasom by Soorya Krishna Moorthy, based on Court Martial, a play by Swadesh Deepak
- Produced by: Mohammed Salim; M. Rajendran
- Starring: Suresh Gopi; Parthiban; Ashokan; Thalaivasal Vijay; Nizhalgal Ravi; Krishnakumar
- Cinematography: Anand Balakrishnan
- Edited by: K Srinivas
- Music by: Samson Kottoor
- Production company: Mark Movies
- Distributed by: Chithralaya Films Release
- Release date: 29 April 2011
- Running time: 105 minutes
- Country: India
- Language: Malayalam

Melvilasom (transl. The Address) is a 2011 Indian courtroom drama film directed by Madhav Ramadasan (in his directorial debut) and written by Soorya Krishna Moorthy. It stars Suresh Gopi and Parthiban in the lead roles, and features Ashokan, Thalaivasal Vijay, Nizhalgal Ravi, Krishnakumar and Sanjay in other pivotal roles. An adaptation of Moorthy's stage play of the same name, which itself was based on the Hindi play Court Martial (1991) by Swadesh Deepak and in turn the 1989 American play A Few Good Men, the film reached theatres on 29 April 2011. It received wide critical acclaim upon release and got a dubbed release in Tamil as Ulvilaasam.

The film does not feature any female characters, except the adopted daughter of Sawar Ramachandran, or songs. The entire film was shot inside a room and filming was completed in just nine days. Sticking close to the Aristotelian unities, the screen time of an hour and half dovetails perfectly with real time. It is widely regarded as one of the defining movies of the Malayalam New Wave.

== Cast ==
- Suresh Gopi as Captain Vikas Roy
- Parthiban as Sawar Ramachandran
- Krishna Kumar as Captain Bhikhari Das Kapoor
- Ashokan as Captain Dr. Gupta
- Nizhalgal Ravi as Major Ajay Puri
- Thalaivasal Vijay as Colonel Surat Singh
- Gauthami (Aria of X:IN) as Ammu, Sawar Ramachandran's daughter
- Sanjay as Lieutenant Colonel Brajrendra Rawat
- V. K. Baiju as Army officer
- Naveen Arakkal as Army officer

== Production ==
=== Play ===
The film is based on the play of the same name that marked the theatre debut of Soorya Krishna Moorthy. It was staged for the first time at Gorky Bhavan in 2005. It became a major success, and has been staged at more than 400 stages around the world. The play was based on the Hindi play Court Martial (1991) by Swadesh Deepak. It was also inspired by real-life incidents narrated by Krishnamoorthy's mentor Gopi Poojapura, a former soldier in the Indian Army. The film credits both Court Martial and Gopi Poojapura.

Swadesh Deepak's Court Martial (1991) was an adaptation of the 1989 play A Few Good Men by Aaron Sorkin, about US Marine David Cox, which served as the basis of the 1992 film of the same name. Deepak's play had earlier been made into the 2008 Hindi film Shaurya.

=== Filming ===
The film was shot in a single room at the University Men's Hostel in Thiruvananthapuram over ten days.

== Critical reception ==
The film received wide critical acclaim. Sify labelled the film a "welcome experiment in Malayalam". The film is described as "technically brilliant", noting film director Madhav Ramadasan's distinct cinematic style in Malayalam and Indian cinema. In regard to performances, the critic praises Suresh Gopi saying he "is absolutely brilliant as Captain Vikas Roy and he scores with his amazing dialogue delivery." Parthiban is appreciated as "he gives subtle acting an altogether different meaning, even though his dialogues are limited to only a few minutes. His lines towards the end can leave you with a lump in the throat."

Nowrunning.com stated, "Melvilasom is a reflection of the staunch belief that a film maker has on his script. It displays a fine sensibility in whatever it has to say, and is peppered all over with real enthusiastic performances." The Hindu also published an extremely positive review stating, "the story is effectively told with well crafted dialogues and riveting performances by the main actors." Rediff rated the film and said, "Melvilasom is exciting as it experiments with new ways of storytelling. Melvilasom is the kind of film that leaves you happy for simply surpassing your expectations."

== Awards and accolades ==
=== Awards ===
- The 15th Gollapudi Srinivas National Award for the Best Debut Director (2011)
- P. Bhaskaran award for the Best Feature film of 2011.
- P. Bhaskaran award for the Best Actor of 2011 - Parthiban.

=== Film festival participation ===
Melvilasom got selected to the 16th Busan International Film Festival (BIFF), in Busan, South Korea. It has also been selected for the Indian Panorama section of the 42nd International Film Festival of India (IFFI), in Panaji, India, and the Malayalam Cinema Today section of the International Film Festival of Kerala, in Thiruvananthapuram, India.

== See also ==
- Trial film
- Caste discrimination in India
- Shaurya, a 2008 Indian film also based on Swadesh Deepak's play
