= Shaurya =

2008 Bollywood film by Samar Khan

- Theatrical poster
- Directed by: Samar Khan
- Written by: Samar Khan; Jaydeep Sarkar; Aparna Malhotra
- Based on: Court Martial by Swadesh Deepak
- Produced by: Moser Baer
- Starring: Kay Kay Menon; Rahul Bose; Javed Jaffrey; Deepak Dobriyal; Minissha Lamba; Pankaj Tripathi
- Cinematography: Carlos Catalán
- Edited by: Sanjib Dutta
- Music by: Songs: Adnan Sami; Background Score: Surinder Sodhi
- Distributed by: Moser Baer Entertainment
- Release date: 4 April 2008
- Running time: 149 minutes
- Country: India
- Language: Hindi

Shaurya (transl. Valour) is a 2008 Indian Hindi-language legal drama film directed by Samar Khan and produced by Moser Baer. The film stars Kay Kay Menon, Rahul Bose, Javed Jaffrey, Deepak Dobriyal, and Minissha Lamba. The film is based on the 1991 Hindi play Court Martial by Swadesh Deepak and the 1992 American film A Few Good Men (the latter being an adaptation of the 1989 play of the same name by Aaron Sorkin about US marine David Cox).

The film was released on 4 April 2008, and received positive reviews from critics praising the performances of the lead actors, in particular Menon and Jaffrey.

== Plot ==
A group of Indian Army soldiers cordons off a village in the Poonch area of Pulwama, Kashmir, during a counter-insurgency operation. Following a series of confrontations, an army officer is shot dead by a colleague, who subsequently surrenders and is taken into custody. In New Delhi, best friends Major Siddhant Chaudhary and Major Akash Kapoor are army lawyers with contrasting personalities. While Akash is dedicated to his profession, Siddhant is carefree and immature. The son of a highly decorated army officer, Siddhant reluctantly joined the military to fulfil his father's expectations, although he has little interest in pursuing a military career. When Akash informs him of their upcoming postings to Srinagar, Siddhant persuades him to arrange for them to be stationed together.

Before their departure, the two discover that they have been assigned opposing roles in the court-martial of two Rashtriya Rifles officers. Captain Javed Khan has been accused of murdering his superior, Major Virendra Singh Rathore, during a counter-insurgency operation. An army inquiry finds Javed guilty of insubordination and murder, leaving Siddhant with the responsibility of defending him against Akash's prosecution. Meanwhile, aspiring journalist Kavya Shastri investigates the case but is denied access to Javed by army authorities. After arriving in Srinagar, Siddhant attempts to question Javed but becomes frustrated by his silence. Akash advises him to plead guilty, believing the evidence against Javed to be overwhelming. Siddhant subsequently meets Kavya and attempts to impress her, inadvertently mentioning Brigadier Pratap, the officers' commanding officer. Kavya publishes a controversial article about Pratap, naming Siddhant as her source and embarrassing the army. Siddhant confronts her, accusing her of exploiting his comments, while his superiors reprimand him for his indiscretion.

Seeking to apologise, Siddhant travels to meet Pratap at his forward posting near the Line of Control. Although Pratap dismisses the controversy, he refuses to discuss the murder case. Siddhant visits the crime scene and begins questioning the official account of events. When he later meets Javed, the latter finally asks whether Siddhant believes him to be innocent. Siddhant promises to present the facts before reaching a conclusion. Kavya subsequently informs Siddhant of a possible cover-up involving Pratap and provides him with documents relating to the case. After examining the evidence, Siddhant begins to suspect that Javed has been framed. He therefore rejects Akash's advice and declares Javed not guilty, promising to prove his innocence. Although the decision initially strains their friendship, the two eventually reconcile.

As Siddhant investigates further, Javed begins cooperating and provides documents supporting his defence. Kavya also visits Javed's ancestral village to speak with his mother. Siddhant and Kavya subsequently investigate Rathore's family, discovering that his marriage to his widow, Neerja, had been abusive. Meanwhile, Kavya uncovers evidence of alleged human rights violations involving Rathore and Pratap. She sends the information to Siddhant but is arrested for trespassing on army property and attempting to access restricted information. Siddhant receives further documents from Neerja, strengthening his suspicions about Pratap's involvement. During a meeting, Pratap reveals that he was a longtime friend of Siddhant's father, Brigadier Shashank Chaudhary, and warns Siddhant against tarnishing his father's legacy. The revelation prompts Siddhant to reconsider his understanding of his father's military service.

When a key witness, Captain R. P. Singh, disappears, Siddhant realises that finding him is crucial to the case. Singh eventually confronts Siddhant and reveals that Rathore had brutalised villagers during the operation, accusing them of supporting Pakistan. After torturing a young boy into admitting that he had concealed weapons, Rathore shot him dead. When Javed intervened to stop the violence and attempted to relieve Rathore of command, Rathore accused him of treason and threatened a young girl. Javed subsequently shot Rathore to protect the villagers. Singh also explains that Javed surrendered despite having an opportunity to escape.

Siddhant asks Singh to testify, but he refuses and subsequently dies by suicide. With the witness unavailable, Siddhant decides to summon Pratap to court, despite warnings from Akash and Kavya. During the proceedings, Siddhant initially struggles to challenge Pratap's testimony but eventually questions him about the murder of his wife, daughter and mother during a communal riot in 1993. Pratap reveals that his family was attacked by their Muslim servant, prompting Siddhant to expose the prejudice underlying his actions. Pratap attempts to justify his conduct through appeals to nationalism and patriotism, but Siddhant challenges his claims and exposes his involvement in the cover-up. The court orders an inquiry against Pratap, who is taken into custody. Akash announces Javed's acquittal, restoring his rank and honours. Javed salutes Siddhant as he leaves the courtroom, having successfully defended his client.

== Cast ==
- Rahul Bose as Major Siddhant "Sid" Chaudhary
- Javed Jaffrey as Major Akash Kapoor
- Kay Kay Menon as Brigadier Rudra Pratap Singh
- Minissha Lamba as Journalist Kavya Shastri
- Seema Biswas as Mrs. Khan
- Deepak Dobriyal as Captain Javed Khan
- Amrita Rao as Nirja Rathore, Major Rathore's widow
- Pavan Malhotra as Army officer
- Aditya Lakhia as Captain R. P. Singh
- Ravi Gossain as Captain Passbola
- Jeneva Talwar as Nandini Kapoor, Akash's fiancé turned wife
- Denzil Smith as Brigadier P. P. V. Nair
- Subrat Dutta as Colonel Malhotra
- Pankaj Tripathi as Major Virendra Singh Rathore
- Bikramjeet Kanwarpal as Colonel Inyat Khan
- Amar Talwar as Brigadier Saxena
- Shah Rukh Khan as Narrator in the end credits

== Soundtrack ==
The soundtrack was composed by Adnan Sami, with lyrics written by Javed Akhtar.

- "Dheere Dheere" - Adnan Sami, Sunidhi Chauhan
- "Ghabra Ke Dar Dar Ke" - Adnan Sami, Sunidhi Chauhan
- "Jaane Kyun Jaane Maan" - Sunidhi Chauhan
- "Dosti Kya Hai" - Udit Narayan, Abhijeet Bhattacharya
- "Shaurya" - Kunal Ganjawala

== Legacy ==
The character Brigadier Rudra Pratap Singh played by Menon gained significant popularity and traction in the 2020s in Hindu nationalist circles, with the character's dialogues being used increasingly in Islamophobic dog-whistling and in calls for violence against Muslims.

== See also ==
- Shaurya missile
- Melvilasom, a 2011 Indian film also based on Swadesh Deepak's play
