= Peter Link =

American composer

Peter Link is an American composer, lyricist, music producer, stage director, and presently CEO/Creative Director of Watchfire Music, an on-line Inspirational record company and music store.

During his career, which spans over 40 years, he has been nominated twice for the Tony Award, including Neil Simon’s The Good Doctor and Joseph Papp’s production of William Shakespeare’s Much Ado About Nothing, won the NY Critics' Drama Desk Award for Salvation out of which came his first million-selling record, "(If You Let Me Make Love to You Then) Why Can't I Touch You?", and worked, mainly as a composer in a number of entertainment mediums ranging from pop music to Broadway, television, ballet, films and Inspirational music.

== Early life, education and family ==
Link was born in St. Louis, Missouri. He is the son of Lyman Link, a Canadian survivor of World War I and musician turned accountant, and Virginia Anderson Link, originally from Chicago, Illinois. He has one brother, James Charles Link, (deceased) an accountant also from St. Louis.

He grew up in Kirkwood, Missouri attending Osage Hills Elementary School, Nipher Middle School and Principia Upper School graduating from high school in 1962. He then attended the University of Virginia on a track and soccer scholarship for one year and finished up his college education as an English major at Principia College where he graduated in 1966 and has repeatedly provided externship sponsorships to the school's students.

Having conducted school choirs, directed musical productions and excelled as a drummer throughout his early childhood, he decided to concentrate on directing musicals, so he moved to New York City and studied acting for two years at The Neighborhood Playhouse School of the Theater under Sanford Meisner and graduated in 1968.

== Theater and film career ==
=== Acting ===
Upon graduation from The Neighborhood Playhouse, Peter had immediate success as an actor, performing in 10 national network commercials that first summer and landing the role of Tom Hughes in CBS Television’s soap opera As the World Turns, playing legendary soap star Eileen Fulton’s son in the autumn of 1968. He also played a small part in Neil Simon’s feature film, The Out-of-Towners, directed by Arthur Hiller and starring Jack Lemmon and Sandy Dennis.

In the winter of 1969, while still working on As The World Turns, Peter was cast as the lead in Hair on Broadway taking over for writer and original lead, Gerome Ragni, in the role of Berger and playing opposite both Heather MacRae and Diane Keaton.

He left Hair to perform one of the two leading roles in his own musical, Salvation, in the spring of 1969 when the show moved uptown to the Jan Hus Theater Salvation proved to be Link's last stage performance, and he moved instead towards a music oriented career.

=== Composer for the musical theater ===
While performing in both Hair and As The World Turns simultaneously, Link composed the music for the rock musical Salvation, collaborating with lyricist and bookwriter, C.C. Courtney. The show debuted at Art D'Lugoff’s Village Gate. The musical was first directed by Link and performed late at night, at 11:00 pm four nights a week, after the long-running Jacques Brel performances.

It opened on March 11, 1969 and was given a positive review by New York Times columnist Lawrence Van Gelder. It was then picked up by producer David Black, who had produced George M!, and moved to the Jan Hus Playhouse for its Off-Broadway run, starting on September 24, 1969 and ending on April 19, 1970 for 239 performances. Out of the show came the hit recorded by Ronnie Dyson, of Hair, "(If You Let Me Make Love To You Then) Why Can't I Touch You?", which sold over a million copies, hitting the Top 10 of the Billboard Hot 100 chart in 1970 and launched Dyson's recording career. Link received the Drama Desk Award for most promising composer for his work on Salvation.

Link and Courtney then collaborated on Earl of Ruston, which opened Mar 10, 1974, a country-western musical that flopped on Broadway. Citing creative differences, Link left the show before it opened.

=== Composer-in-residence ===
Joseph Papp, producer of The New York Shakespeare Festival, hired Link to be Composer-in-Residence at the Shakespeare Festival and The Public Theater. There, Link refined his abilities as a composer for the musical theater and for the next five years composed music for over 40 shows.

Notable are: John Ford Noonan’s Older People (a Drama Desk Award winner) starring Barnard Hughes and Will Hare; the rock opera, The Wedding of Iphigenia with Nell Carter, Andrea Marcovicci, Marta Heflin which also played at the Young Vic in London; The Orphan with Cliff DeYoung; Comedy Of Errors with Linda Lavin, Don Scardino and Michael Tucker; and Trelawny of the 'Wells' at the Lincoln Center with Meryl Streep, John Lithgow, Mandy Patinkin, Michael Tucker and Mary Beth Hurt and directed by A. J. Antoon.

While also at the Public Theater, Link composed the score for Joseph Papp's Much Ado About Nothing, which was presented at the Delacorte Theatre in Central Park on Broadway and also as a CBS Television Special. This was the longest running Shakespeare production to ever run on Broadway and won for Link his first Tony Award Nomination. The show was directed by A. J. Antoon and starred Sam Waterston, Kathleen Widdoes and Barnard Hughes.

=== Broadway ===
Much Ado About Nothing began its Broadway run at the Winter Garden Theatre in NYC Nov 11, 1972. On the same weekend Link had his second Broadway show open within three days. That was Michael Cacoyannis’ production of Lysistrata starring Melina Mercouri. Not nearly as successful as Much Ado was, Lysistrata received negative reviews and closed in four days.

Next Link, again collaborated with director A. J. Antoon, when he composed the score for Neil Simon’s The Good Doctor which opened Nov 27, 1973 to mostly positive reviews. It starred Christopher Plummer, Marsha Mason, Barnard Hughes, Francis Sternhagen and René Auberjonois and won for Link yet another Tony Award nomination for Best Original Score in 1974.

Following his second major success, Link became established as a composer of Broadway plays featuring cinematic scores. Link followed with scores for Ulysses in Nighttown which opened Mar 10, 1974 under the direction of Burgess Meredith, starring Zero Mostel and also James Lipton’s production of The Mighty Gents written by Richard Wesley and starring Dorian Harewood with then newcomer Morgan Freeman which opened on April 16, 1978.

Link also composed the musical score for King of Hearts which opened on Broadway October 22, 1978 during the NY newspaper strike of 1978. Though the show was well reviewed in the Boston press, the NY reviews were mixed and the production was hampered by the newspaper strike. The show has been produced often since its Broadway debut and received a rave review from the NY Times during its 2002 production at the Goodspeed Opera. On Broadway, the show starred Don Scardino, Bob Gunton and Millicent Martin.

=== Off-Broadway ===
After the Broadway and Off-Broadway success of Salvation, Link continued to work in theaters outside of the Broadway Box.

The River, a collage of rock, rap and pop gospel, extolling water in spiritual and metaphorical terms and paralleling the cycle of water and the life cycle of man, opened at the Promenade Theater in January 1988. It received a mostly favorable review from Mel Gussow of the NY Times.

The River won a number of the off-Broadway TOR Awards not only for Best Musical, but also won for Mr. Link Best Director and Best Composer/Lyricist.

=== Regional theater productions ===
Island opened to rave reviews December 1978 at The Milwaukee Repertory Theater with book, music and lyrics by Link drawn from Brent Nicholson Earle's concept and starring Chad Mitchell and Jenny Burton. The show was later produced at The Portland Stage Company in 1980-81 and The Virginia Stage Company.

On The Road To Babylon was a rock musical which opened to mixed reviews December 1979 at The Milwaukee Rep with book by Richard Wesley and music and lyrics by Link drawn from a concept by Brent Nicholson Earle.

Sundown is a contemporary country musical about Doc Holliday and Wyatt Earp and the days leading up to the gunfight at the OK Corral with music by Peter Link, lyrics by Larry Rosler and book by Joe Bravaco and Larry Rosler. It was work-shopped at the ASCAP/Disney workshops in NYC and in May 2002 had its world premier receiving rave reviews at the Lyric Stage in Dallas. It played a two-month run at the Barter Theater in Virginia in the spring of 2003 and received a new presentation in March 2008 at The Adobe Theater in New Mexico. Its album, produced by Peter Link and starring Broadway veterans, Steve Blanchard and Judy McLane, was named one of the Top Ten Best Theatrical Albums of 2004 by Jonathan Frank in Talking Broadway.

=== Film and television scores ===
Link has written the film scores for several Movies of the Week for television, Nightmare with Richard Crenna and Patty Duke, The Great Niagara with Richard Boone and Enormous Changes At The Last Minute, a feature film for ABC, released theatrically in 1982, starring Kevin Bacon, David Strathairn, and Ellen Barkin.

He created and wrote the title song and theme music for Vegetable Soup, the popular children's television show on racism that ran from 1975 to 1978 on PBS and for which he won several ASIFA Animation Awards.

== Ballet ==
In 1976, he extended his musical influence to the ballet world, orchestrating, arranging and composing from Stephen Foster themes for the Joffrey Ballet Company's bicentennial ballet Drums, Dreams and Banjos which was choreography by Gerald Arpino.

== Record production ==
Link is a producer of recordings works in a number of different genres ranging from Pop to Gospel to Folk, Classical Crossover and occasionally Broadway. His song, "(If You Let Me Make Love To You), Then Why Can’t I Touch You", as recorded by Ronnie Dyson sold over a million records for Columbia Records.

In his early career, his songs were also recorded by Johnnie Mathis ("(If You Let Me Make Love to You Then) Why Can't I Touch You" appeared on Close to You), Dionne Warwick (who also used the former Dyson track on From Within), Peggy Lee ("Let's Get Lost In Now") and even Mae West (on her rendition of "In Between" from Salvation).

=== Watchfire Music ===
In 2006, Link founded, with James Birch, Watchfire Music, an Inspirational record company and on-line music store specializing in both recorded music and digital sheet music downloads. With over fifty inspirational artists as well as over two hundred composers creating sheet music, the company has grown steadily to become one of the leaders in the Inspirational Music market. Link has served as Creative Director of the company and has been recently named CEO. Julia Wade is Director of Digital Sheet Music and serves as President of Watchfire Music.

=== Westrax Recording Studios ===
Link also built and owned Westrax Recording Studios, an analog/digital/midi recording studio in New York City for 23 years. Westrax specialized in recording theatrical productions and provided preproduction services for composers. Among the early recordings that came out of Westrax are Forever Plaid, City of Angels, Kiss of the Spider Woman, and Harvey Schmidt's and Tom Jones's Roadside.

== Podcasts ==
In 2021, Link began a podcast, Scattershot Symphony, The Music Of Peter Link, produced as part of Watchfire Music’s Theater Of The Imagination, which has reached over 140 countries with episodes featuring music ranging throughout his career. He also produced and appeared on the podcast, Havin’ A Talk With God along with Watchfire Music President and artist, Julia Wade.

In 2022, he released Rosemary and Thyme, a podcast musical with 16 episodes, which is a modern-day Christmas story. It involved performers from Broadway including Judy McLane, Steve Blanchard, Terry Burrell, and Julia Wade, along with television and film actors, Michael Tucker, Don Scardino, and Wayne Duvall. Link composed the music while co-writing the book and lyrics with poet and playwright Ragan Courtney.

== Selected discography ==
- 1969: Salvation – Cast Album, Peter Link music and lyrics
- 1970: (If You Let Me Make Love To You Then) Why Can’t I Touch You – Ronnie Dyson, Peter Link music
- 1973: The Good Doctor – Peter Link score and songs
- 1974: Much Ado About Nothing – CBS Television, Peter Link score
- 1975–78: Vegetable Soup – Peter Link songs and score
- 1978: King of Hearts – Original Cast, Peter Link score
- 1994: The Jenny Burton Experience – Jenny Burton, Peter Link Producer
- 2005: Sundown – Original Cast, Peter Link composer
- 2005: Coming Home – Mindy Jostyn, Peter Link producer and orchestration
- 2007: Story For The Ages – Julia Wade, Peter Link producer
- 2007: I Think On These Things – Jenny Burton, Peter Link composer
- 2012: Silk Road – Julia Wade, Peter Link composer and producer
- 2013: Goin’ Home – Peter Link, artist, composer and producer
- 2016: Is Anybody Listening? – Jenny Burton, Julia Wade, Peter Link composer and producer
- 2017: Sunday Morning – Julia Wade, Peter Link composer and producer
- 2018: Remnants – Peter Link, Peter Link composer and producer

== Concerts ==
Link produced and directed the Jenny Burton Experience which was Pop/Inspirational/R&B act that played to packed houses in a seven-year run at Don’t Tell Mama in New York City. The group won the cabaret awards for Best Vocal Group including the Backstage Bistro Award, the Critics' Choice Award and The MAC Award. They also were the first Gospel group to ever headline in Atlantic City at Resorts International.

As a director he wrote and directed JOSH, a one-man musical about the late Josh White starring his son Josh White Jr., and the three productions of WAITIN’ IN THE WINGS: The Night The Understudies Take Center Stage, produced by William Spencer Reilly.

In addition to this he produced and wrote with Al Pacino and directed With Heartfelt Thanks - A Tribute To Lee Strasberg at the Lincoln Center which featured over thirty major stars and Close Upon The Hour, a benefit evening for the American Run for the End of Aids featuring his songs and starring most of the top New York cabaret stars.

He wrote, directed and performed in Please Don’t Let It Rain, a concert of his own music at the Delacorte Theater in Central Park presented by Joseph Papp and starring Andre DeShields, David Lasley, and Marta Heflin.

In 2016, Link wrote and directed Is Anybody Listening? – In Concert and webcast starring Jenny Burton and Julia Wade presented at NYC’s Sheen Center.
