= Leavin' (album) =

Studio album by Natalie Cole
- Released: September 26, 2006
- Studios: DARP Studios and Doppler Studios (Atlanta, Georgia); Radio Recorders (Los Angeles, California); Conway Studios (Hollywood, California)
- Genres: R&B; pop
- Length: 52:13
- Label: Verve
- Producers: Natalie Cole (exec.); Dallas Austin (exec.); David Munk (exec.); Peter Mokran

Natalie Cole chronology
| Ask a Woman Who Knows (2002) | Leavin' (2006) | Still Unforgettable (2008) |

Singles from Leavin'
- 1. "Day Dreaming" Released: August 1, 2006

Leavin' is a studio album by American recording artist Natalie Cole, released on September 26, 2006, by Verve Records. The album consists of ten cover versions of various R&B and pop songs and two original songs: "5 Minutes Away" and "Don't Say Goodnight (It's Time for Love)". It was the second of Cole's albums to be released by Verve Records and her first album in four years, following Ask a Woman Who Knows (2002). Cole promoted the album as a return to her R&B roots, distancing herself from an identification as a jazz artist.

Critics gave the album generally positive reviews, praising Cole's interpretations of the covered material, and compared her favorably to contemporary R&B artists. The album peaked at number 97 on the Billboard 200 chart in the United States, and charted in Germany and Switzerland. It spawned one single – Cole's cover of Aretha Franklin's 1972 song "Day Dreaming" – with an accompanying music video. She performed the song at the BET special An Evening of Stars: Tribute to Aretha Franklin. She embarked on a theatre tour in the fall of 2006 to support the album.

== Background and recording ==
Co-executive producer David Munk suggested the concept for Leavin' as a way for Natalie Cole to return to R&B through "an intimate, classic soul CD with a small group of sidemen and simple production". He described the Atlanta recording sessions as eclectic, and said: "[Cole] shared with me her hope of making a country-soul record in Memphis; she also spoke of doing a piano-voice album and of recording in Spanish". During a 2006 interview with American Songwriter, Cole said Leavin' had been "born out of desperation", as she wanted to record pop and urban music rather than jazz. She sought to avoid being typecast as only a jazz singer through returning to R&B and demanding more artistic control. As an arranger on the album, she said the recording sessions reminded her of how she "missed the freedom ... ad-libbing, you know, and being able to holler every now and then ... all of that energy".

Cole initially looked for original songs to record for the album, but criticized "the songs being sent [as] pretty bad". According to Vibe, Cole decided to do a cover album to establish a connection between song and interpreter and between singer and audience" and appeal to "fans yearning for the good old days before they had to hire a sitter to go see a show". She later clarified that she was unable to record original musical since "we're doing a contemporary urban record on a jazz budget".

While promoting the album, Cole described R&B, rock, and pop as being her "forte", and said that she wished the recorded Leavin' "at least five years ago". Discussing her dissatisfaction with being labeled a jazz singer and her desire to showcase her versatility, she said that she wanted to "put out some music that we hadn't heard in a long time from anybody, really". The project was Cole's first collaboration with Dallas Austin. Rashod Ollison of The Virginian-Pilot wrote the album represented how "[Cole] had hung up the gowns and returned to her soul roots"; in past performances, Cole would wear gowns when singing jazz. During the production, Verve Records stipulated that it must include original material. One of the two new songs "Five Minutes Away" was based on Cole's experiences with Austin and keyboard player Chanz Parkman. Prior to the album's release, CBS News' Caitlin Johnson wrote that it was "a sharp turn for a woman perhaps best known for singing jazz standards." She connected the project to Cole's decision to reinvent herself, saying that its title represented "leaving the past behind".

== Composition ==
Leavin' is a contemporary R&B and pop music album consisting of twelve tracks, with an additional remix on digital copies. Cole said the material "has given me the opportunity to explore the greatness in the songs of some of our most talented and gifted songwriters," emphasizing the album's "fresh new twist on some great music".

The album opens with Cole's cover of Fiona Apple's "Criminal" (1997). Len Righi of The Morning Call wrote that Cole transformed the song from an "agonizing, brazen lament" into "a funky, Tina Turner-type, rump-shaker." The second track is a cover of Neil Young's 1972 single "Old Man"; David Munk called it "a personal rumination on her father". The third song, a cover of Aretha Franklin's "Day Dreaming" (1972), was recorded after Austin sang it in the studio. Cole said she "added a little bit of a hip-hop feel to it". Richard Harrington of The Washington Post felt that the fourth track, a cover of Shelby Lynne's "Leavin'" (1999), "metaphorically put a little distance between the original R&B diva and the pop star Cole". The fifth song is a cover of Ronnie Dyson's 1976 track "The More You Do it (The More I Like It Done to Me)"; NPR's Jason King attributes the inclusion of "the saucy but largely forgotten Yancy-Jackson mid-'70s track" to his suggestion to Cole's A&R director. The song contains a homage to Cole's 1975 single "This Will Be (An Everlasting Love)". The seventh track is a cover of Dobie Gray's 1973 single "Loving Arms" (here titled "Lovin' Arms"), which Verve Records marketed as inspired by Etta James.

The eighth track on the album is a cover of Bonnie Raitt's "Love Letter" (1989), and the following song "The Man with the Child in His Eyes" (1978) was described as an "ethereal" take on the Kate Bush original. Maura Johnston of Rolling Stone wrote that the original song "5 Minutes Away" was a "rumination on love and life accented by dry horns and capped with a rousing call-and-response". The tenth track is the second original song "Don't Say Goodnight (It's Time for Love)", written by Cole, Ernie Isley, and Chris Jasper. Cole explained that she included the cover of Des'ree's "You Gotta Be" (1994) as the eleventh song on the album due to the positive fan response to her prior performances; she described it as an example of her experimentation with "bringing a jazzy flavor to some pop songs". The album concludes with a cover of Sting's "If I Ever Lose My Faith in You" (1993), which emphasizes its spiritual context through the addition of four Beatitudes. An acoustic version of "Lovin' Arms" featuring Keb' Mo' was included as a digital bonus track.

== Release and promotion ==
Leavin' was first released by Verve Records on CD and MP3 download in the United States on September 26, 2006. In 2010, it was made available in Europe, Indonesia, and Russia on CD. To promote the album, Cole was slated to appear on "a number of major morning and late night television programs" to perform "several intimate showcases" of her music. She also embarked on a theater tour in the fall of 2006. It was her first club-sized tour in roughly two decades. Cole had chosen to sing her 1970s hits in an attempt to draw more R&B fans. She also decided to perform every song from the record, saying she couldn't "remember when a performer took a whole album and performed it onstage".

"Day Dreaming" was released as the lead single from the album on August 1, 2006. Director Doug Biro shot the accompanying music video, which features Cole singing with her band in front of a white background. The song earned Cole a nomination at the 49th Annual Grammy Awards for Best Female R&B Vocal Performance, but she lost to Mary J. Blige for her 2005 single "Be Without You". Cole performed "Day Dreaming" at the BET special An Evening of Stars: Tribute to Aretha Franklin along with an arrangement of Franklin's 1970 single "Call Me".

== Reception ==
Professional ratings
Review scores
| Source | Rating |
|---|---|
| AllMusic | 3.5/5 stars |
| BBC | favorable |
| News24 | 3/5 stars |
| USA Today | 3/4 stars |

Leavin' received positive reviews from music critics. The album was called a "treat for any Cole fan" by Andy Kellman of AllMusic, who drew attention to how it sounds like it was recorded at a "leisurely pace". Continuing this thought, Kellman noted that Cole was "breez[ing] through an easygoing set of covers". The BBC's Chris Rogers defined the album as "an ultra smooth mix of standards both tasteful and obtuse". Jay S. Jacobs of PopEntertainment.com compared Leavin' to Cole's 1999 release, Snowfall on the Sahara, and viewed it as "jazzy but decidedly more modern and surprisingly strong". People's Ralph Novak, Chuck Arnold, V. R. Peterson, and Monica Rizzo commended Cole's decision to "ditch the evening-gown fare on her new CD" by recording more contemporary songs. Gugu Mkhabela from News24 awarded the album three out of five stars, describing the material as "pure old school with a modern twist", with Cole providing "a touch of class and some depth to boot".

Critics positively compared Leavin's to works by other R&B artists. Rogers wrote that it was a perfect fit for listeners of Joss Stone and Jamie Cullum. Daniel Garrett of The Compulsive Reader listed the record alongside Ella Fitzgerald's The Best of the Song Books (1993) and Diana Ross' Blue (2006), praising each woman as the "three ladies of song". Honolulu Star-Bulletin's Gary C.W. Chun favorably compared Leavin to Gladys Knight's Before Me (2006). Rogers wrote that Cole's vocal performance demonstrated a "tasteful restraint" and was an improvement over contemporary artists. He felt that Cole's voice was better than the "modulated warbling that seems to pass for contemporary R&B these days".

Leavin' reached a peak position of number 97 on the Billboard 200, and spent two weeks on the chart. It also peaked Billboard's R&B Albums at number 16, spending eight weeks on the chart. In Germany, the album peaked on the German Album Charts at number 92. In Switzerland, it reached a peak position of number 76 on the Swiss Album Charts. Two years following its release, the album had sold roughly 57,000 copies.

== Track listing ==
- Writing and production credits for the songs are taken from the booklet of Leavin'. Dallas Austin produced every track except "You Gotta Be", which was done by Natalie Cole.

| No. | Title | Writer(s) | Length |
|---|---|---|---|
| 1. | "Criminal" | Fiona Apple | 4:04 |
| 2. | "Old Man" | Neil Young | 4:35 |
| 3. | "Day Dreaming" | Aretha Franklin | 3:34 |
| 4. | "Leavin'" | Shelby Lynne | 3:48 |
| 5. | "The More You Do it (The More I Like It Done to Me)" | Marvin Yancy | 3:25 |
| 6. | "Lovin' Arms" | Tom Jans | 3:48 |
| 7. | "Love Letter" | Bonnie Hayes | 3:49 |
| 8. | "The Man with the Child in His Eyes" | Kate Bush | 4:53 |
| 9. | "5 Minutes Away" | Dallas Austin; Natalie Cole | 4:21 |
| 10. | "Don't Say Goodnight (It's Time for Love)" | Natalie Cole; Ernie Isley; Chris Jasper | 5:40 |
| 11. | "You Gotta Be" | Des'ree; Ashley Ingram | 3:45 |
| 12. | "If I Ever Lose My Faith in You" | Sting | 5:38 |
| Total length: | | | 52:13 |

Leavin' – (Digital Bonus Track)
| No. | Title | Writer(s) | Length |
|---|---|---|---|
| 13. | "Lovin' Arms" (featuring Keb' Mo') (Keb' Mo' Acoustic Version) | Tom Jans | 4:44 |
| Total length: | | | 56:57 |

== Personnel ==
Musicians and Vocalists

- Natalie Cole – lead vocals, backing vocals (12)
- Marvin "Chanz" Parkman – keyboards (1, 9), acoustic piano (2, 5, 7, 8), Rhodes electric piano (3, 10), backing vocals (3, 9, 12), organ (4, 7), string synthesizer (12)
- Tony Reyes – guitars (1–10, 12), bass (1–5, 7–10, 12), backing vocals (3, 9, 12)
- Paul Jackson Jr. – guitars (11), bass (11)
- Dallas Austin – drums (1–5, 7–10, 12), percussion (1–5, 7–10, 12), keyboards (10)
- Kevin Ricard – cajón (11)
- Will Scruggs – baritone saxophone (1, 7), tenor saxophone (1, 7, 9)
- Wes Funderburk – trombone (1, 7, 9)
- Ken Watters – trumpet (1, 7, 9)
- James Patterson – flute (3)
- The Half Time Horns – horns (5)
  - Marques Adams – alto saxophone
  - Travis Omari McCauley – trombone
  - Donla Willis III – trumpet
- The "N" Sisters – backing vocals (1–5, 7–10)
- The Colletts (Frissy, Missy and Prissy) – backing vocals (2, 5)
- Alonzo "Novel" Stevenson – backing vocals (3, 9, 12)

Music arrangements

- Natalie Cole – rhythm arrangements, vocal arrangements, horn arrangements (6, 9)
- Dallas Austin – horn arrangements (1, 5), vocal arrangements (1, 6), rhythm arrangements (8)
- Rick Sheppard – vocal arrangements (1)
- Tony Reyes – rhythm arrangements (2)
- The Half Time Horns – horn arrangements (5)
- Wes Funderburk – horn arrangements (7)
- Paul Jackson Jr. – rhythm arrangements (11)

String section on "The Man With the Child in His Eyes"

- Eddie Horst – arrangements
- David Hancock and Charae Krueger – cello
- Tania Maxwell Clements, Cathy Lynn and Joli Wu – viola
- Peter Ciaschini, Carolyn Hancock, Alice Lord, John Meisner and Christopher Pulgram – violin

Parkman's Ensemble Choir on "The Man With the Child in His Eyes"

- Kimberly Edwards, Nicole Harvey, Rene D. James, Fatimah Jester, Jeree Manning, Vanessa Marshall, Soinji Mickey, Alisha D. Monson, Marvin "Chanz" Parkman, Tony Reyes, Jermaine Thomas, Turmaine Thomas, Tammy White, John Woodbury and Tanjala Wright

== Production ==
- Natalie Cole – executive producer, producer
- Dallas Austin – executive producer, producer (1–10, 12)
- David Munk – co-executive producer
- Peter Mokran – additional production, mix engineer
- Rick Sheppard – engineer (1–10, 12)
- Ralph Cacciurri – string recording (8)
- Shawn Everett – recording (11)
- Graham Marsh – assistant engineer (1–10, 12)
- Rick DeVarona – string recording assistant (8)
- Sam Holland – mix assistant
- Seth Waldmann – mix assistant
- Bernie Grundman – mastering at Bernie Grundman Mastering (Hollywood, California)
- Evelyn Morgan – A&R administration
- Sharliss Ashbury – production coordinator
- Kimberly Smith – production coordinator
- Theodora Kuslan – release coordinator
- Kelly Pratt – release coordinator
- Hollis King – art direction
- Isabelle Wong / Isthetic – graphic design
- Kwaku Aiston – photography
- Sylvia Grieser – wardrobe
- Janet Zeltoun – hair stylist
- Jay Maurel – make-up
- Moir/Borman Entertainment – management

== Charts ==
| Chart (2006) | Peak position |
|---|---|
| German Album Charts | 92 |
| Swiss Album Charts | 76 |
| US Billboard 200 | 97 |
| US Top R&B/Hip-Hop Albums (Billboard) | 16 |

== Release history ==
| Country | Date | Format | Label |
|---|---|---|---|
| Worldwide | January 1, 2006 | MP3 | Verve Records |
| Worldwide | September 26, 2006 | Audio CD | Verve Records |
