= Patty Grubman =

American theatrical producer

- Born: February 23, 1956 (age 69)
- Education: University of California, Los Angeles
- Occupation(s): Theatrical producer, entrepreneur

Patricia M. Grubman (born February 23, 1956), also known as Patty Grubman, is an American theatrical producer and entrepreneur. She won the Tony Awards for Grand Hotel in the Best Musical category. She is the founder of The City Farm and co-founder of the Dream Street Foundation.

== Early life and education ==
Grubman was born to Seymour Grubman, who owned manufacturing plants for grocery bags, and Arlene Grubman, a homemaker. She attended Menlo College, University of Southern California, and University of California, Los Angeles.

== Career ==
Grubman's debut Broadway production was Dancin' in 1978, directed and choreographed by Bob Fosse. It was nominated for seven Tony Awards. She also produced King of Hearts, a musical based on the classic film, and Bent, a dramatic play by Martin Sherman. This show presented Richard Gere in his debut starring role on Broadway. The play was nominated for a Pulitzer Prize and Best Play for the Tony Awards in 1980, and won the Dramatists Guild Best Play Award. Grubman's 1989 production Grand Hotel: The Musical was directed and choreographed by Tommy Tune. In 1990, Grand Hotel garnered 12 Tony Award nominations, winning five, including best direction and choreography.

== Property and animal rescue ==
Since 2009, Grubman has owned a 20-acre ranch and farm located in Somis, California. She developed the property into a sanctuary for miniature horses that she rescued, which she had previously housed at her residence in Los Angeles.

== Broadway productions ==
- Grand Hotel (1989) – Producer
- Bent (1979) – Producer
- King of Hearts (1978) – Producer
- Dancin' (1978) – Associate Producer
