= A Few Good Men (play) =

Play by Aaron Sorkin, later adapted to film

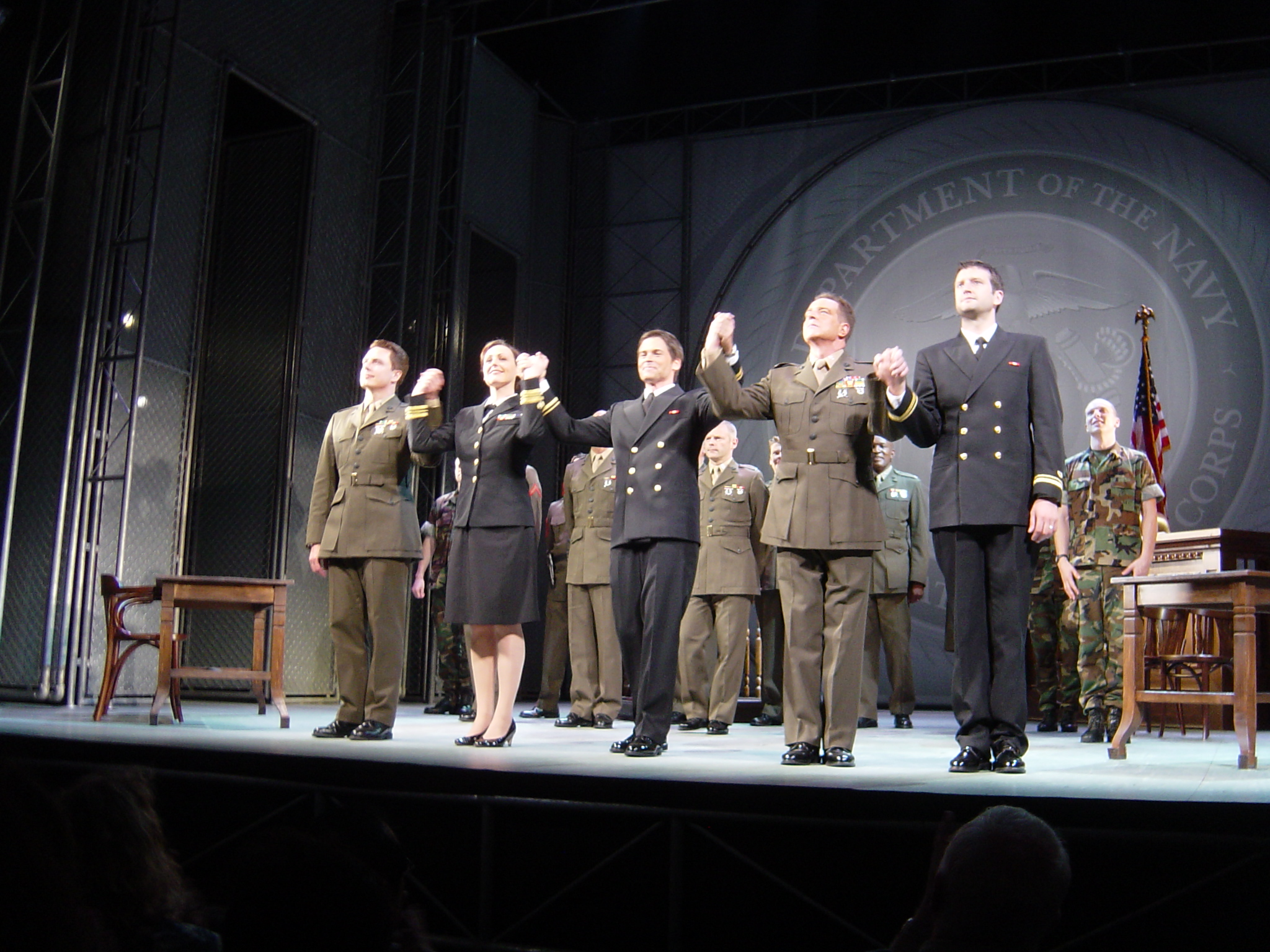
- The cast of A Few Good Men play at the Haymarket Theatre, London, England in 2005
- Original language: English
- Written by: Aaron Sorkin
- Subject: Military justice
- Genre: Courtroom drama
- Setting: Summer 1986; Guantanamo Bay Naval Base (Cuba); General court-martial at the Washington Naval Yard on the Potomac River in Washington, D.C.

Premiere
- Place: John F. Kennedy Center for the Performing Arts in Washington, D.C.

A Few Good Men is a play by Aaron Sorkin, first produced on Broadway by David Brown in 1989. It tells the story of military lawyers at a court-martial who uncover a high-level conspiracy in the course of defending their clients, two United States Marines accused of murder.

It opened on Broadway at the Music Box Theatre in Manhattan of New York City on November 15, 1989, in a production directed by Don Scardino, with Tom Hulce as Lieutenant (junior grade) Daniel Kaffee, Megan Gallagher as Lieutenant Commander Joanne Galloway, and Stephen Lang as Colonel Jessep. Michael O'Hare replaced Lang as Col. Jessep later in the run.

Sorkin adapted his work three years later into a screenplay for the 1992 feature film of the same name.

== Plot ==
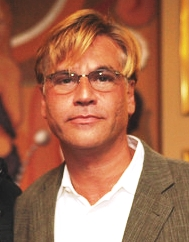
Author of A Few Good Men Aaron Sorkin

Private William Santiago, a United States Marine at the United States Navy's Guantanamo Bay Naval Base is killed by fellow marines Lance Corporal Harold Dawson and Private First Class Louden Downey under mysterious circumstances. Their superiors claim Santiago was killed by Dawson in retaliation for whistleblowing illegal activity, but investigator and lawyer Lieutenant Commander Joanne Galloway suspects they were carrying out an illegal "code red" order: a brutal extrajudicial punishment that in recent years has been outlawed by military regulations. Though Galloway hopes to represent them, the case is assigned to fellow Navy officer and lawyer Lieutenant (j.g.) Daniel Kaffee, a bumbling attorney who enjoys accepting plea bargain deals and avoiding drawn-out trials, while Galloway serves with Lieutenant (j.g.) Sam Weinberg as assistant counsel. Kaffee's casual attitude bothers the intense, driven Galloway, while Galloway annoys Kaffee with her meddling and her overbearingness.

Through flashbacks, it is revealed that Santiago, who performed poorly among his fellow marines, had gone outside the chain of command to the Naval Criminal Investigation Service (NCIS) to request a transfer. Although Lieutenant Colonel Matthew Markinson requested that Santiago be transferred, his senior Base Commander Colonel Nathan Jessep instructed Lieutenant Jonathan James Kendrick, Private Santiago's platoon commander, to "train" Santiago, in turn leading to Dawson and Downey carrying out the code red order. When Santiago was accidentally killed, Jessep covered his tracks by claiming that Santiago was due to be transferred back to America the following day, and that Dawson and Downey carried out the act illegally.

At Guantanamo Bay, Kaffee and Galloway interrogate Jessep and others, where Jessep immediately takes a disliking to Kaffee. Dawson and Downey reject Kaffee's offer to enter into a plea agreement with a minimal sentence from U.S. Marine Captain Jack Ross, insisting they were following a code red order from Kendrick and never intended for Santiago to die. Kaffee at first tries to quit his position as their counsel in frustration, complaining he was only assigned the case so it could be swept under the rug with a settlement, but ultimately surprises the defense team by entering a not guilty plea at the arraignment.

Markinson secretly sends the defense a witness statement with evidence that Jessep never requested Santiago's transfer. With this information under their belt, Kaffee tries to paint a favorable picture of Dawson in court, and confirms through Downey's testimony that code reds have been ordered since their supposed ban. However, on cross-examination Ross gets Downey to admit he was not present when Dawson allegedly received the code red instructions from Kendrick. Before the defense can call Markinson to testify, he kills himself out of guilt for not protecting Santiago.

Kaffee initially believes the case is lost without Markinson's testimony, but Galloway proposes calling Jessep to the stand and make him testify under oath. Kaffee at first rejects this as to do so puts him at risk of a court-martial for defying a superior officer, but they soon realize they can manipulate Jessep's narcissism and inflated sense of importance to get him to admit to ordering the code red. In court, Kaffee unnerves Jessep by pointing out a discrepancy in his testimony: that Marines never disobey orders, yet he claims Santiago was to be relocated for his safety. Jessep takes the bait and launches into a rant berating Kaffee for not understanding how important his role is in national security, and he refuses to have his ability to lead his troops questioned, proudly proclaiming he ordered the code red. Jessep is quickly arrested by order of the observing military judges.

The murder and conspiracy charges against Dawson and Downey are dropped, but they are found guilty of lesser offenses of "conduct unbecoming" and will be dishonorably discharged. Downey is confused, repeating they did nothing wrong, but Dawson explains to him that they failed to stand up for people who were too helpless to defend themselves, like Santiago. Kaffee tells Dawson that having honor does not require wearing a patch on one's arm. Before prosecutor Ross leaves to arrest Kendrick, Kaffee and Ross give each other compliments as friends.

== Characters ==
- United States Navy JAG Corps Lieutenant Junior Grade Daniel A. Kaffee: The main lawyer who defends both Dawson and Downey. He starts as a plea-bargain-happy lawyer and, with help from Joanne Galloway, he develops into a lawyer who is willing to fight for his clients.
- United States Marine Corps Private First Class Louden Downey: One of the two men accused of the murder of Santiago. He is the quiet member of the two soldiers and lets Lance Corporal Dawson do the talking for him.
- United States Navy JAG Corps Lieutenant Commander Joanne Galloway: A hardworking and determined lawyer who finds and brings light to the murder case.
- United States Navy JAG Corps Captain Isaac Whitaker: The commanding officer in Washington. He sends Galloway to Guantanamo Bay.
- United States Marine Corps Judge Advocate Division Lieutenant Jack Ross: The lawyer who oversees prosecuting Dawson and Downey.
- United States Marine Corps Lieutenant colonel Matthew A. Markinson: Worked with Jessep and suggested moving Santiago.
- United States Marine Corps Colonel Nathan R. Jessep: The commanding officer in Guantanamo Bay. He ordered the "Code Red" of Private Santiago.
- United States Marine Corps Lance Corporal Harold W. Dawson: One of the two men accused of the murder of Private Santiago.
- United States Marine Corps First Lieutenant Jonathan James Kendrick: Santiago's platoon commander.

== Production ==
=== Development ===
Sorkin got the idea for the play from a phone conversation with his sister Deborah, who had graduated from Boston University Law School and was serving a three-year stint with the Navy Judge Advocate General's Corps. She was going to Guantanamo Bay Naval Base to defend a group of Marines who had come close to killing a fellow Marine in a hazing ordered by a superior officer. Sorkin took that information and wrote much of his story on cocktail napkins during the first act of the musical La Cage aux Folles while bartending at the Palace Theatre on Broadway.

Several former Navy JAG lawyers have been proposed as the model for the character of Lieutenant Daniel Kaffee, USN, JAG Corps. These include Donald Marcari, David Iglesias, and Walter Bansley III. The court martial was Marcari's first big court case. However, in a statement released by his spokeswoman, Sorkin said, "The character of Dan Kaffee in A Few Good Men is entirely fictional and was not inspired by any particular individual."

Once Sorkin completed a draft, his theatrical agent sent it to producer David Brown, who wanted the film rights. Sorkin sold Brown the rights, getting Brown to agree to also produce A Few Good Men as a play.

=== Premiere ===
A Few Good Men had its world premiere at the Heritage Repertory Theatre at the University of Virginia's Department of Drama on September 19, 1989. It then transferred to the Kennedy Center.

The original Broadway stage production opened at the Music Box Theatre in New York on November 15, 1989, in a production directed by Don Scardino, designed by Ben Edwards, and with music by John Gromada. It starred Tom Hulce as LTJG Kaffee; Megan Gallagher as LCDR JoAnne Galloway; Clark Gregg as Lt. Jack Ross; Stephen Lang as Col. Jessup, and Robert Hogan as Capt. Matthew A. Markinson. Replacement actors included Timothy Busfield and Bradley Whitford as Lt. Jack Ross (understudy for Kaffee), Perry King, Michael O'Hare, and Ron Perlman as Jessep, and Pamela Blair as Galloway. Joshua Malina also appeared. Malina went on to appear in the movie adaption.

The production ran for 497 performances.

=== Other notable productions ===
A Spanish-language production titled Hombres de Honor opened on January 10, 1991, at the Ferré Performing Arts Center in Puerto Rico, starring Cordelia González and Rafo Muñiz, directed by Pablo Cabrera.

A national touring company performed through 1992 with Michael O'Keefe as LTJG Kaffee, Alyson Reed as LCDR Galloway, and Paul Winfield as the judge.

In January 1993 A Few Good Men had its premiere in German language at the Volkstheater, Vienna, Austria (translation: Gunther Baumann, director: Erhard Pauer, Daniel Kaffee: Alfons Haider). In the following years this production went on tour and was shown all over Germany, Switzerland and Austria (German title: Eine Frage der Ehre/A Question of Honor).

A revival of the play starring Rob Lowe in the role of LTJG Kaffee, Suranne Jones as LCDR Galloway, and John Barrowman as Capt. Ross opened at the Theatre Royal Haymarket, London, in late August 2005 for preview showings followed by a three-month run in early September 2005. The stage show was directed by David Esbjornson.

In 2006, the Hudson Shakespeare Company of New Jersey staged a production as part of their second stage for modern shows. The tour was presented in city courtrooms, directed by Jon Ciccarelli and featured notable New York City actors such as Jon Crefeld as LTJG Kaffee and Charles J. Roby as Col. Jessup.

Jensen Ackles appeared as LTJG Kaffee alongside Lou Diamond Phillips as Col. Jessup in a production of the play at the Casa Mañana Theatre, in Fort Worth, Texas, June 5–10, 2007.

A Hungarian production of the play was performed at Madách Szinház, Budapest. It was directed by Imre Kerényi, starring Sándor Czvetkó, Éva Kerekes, and Gábor Koncz.

Indian writer Swadesh Deepak adapted the play into Hindi as Court Martial (1991) which served as the basis of the films Shaurya (2008) and Melvilasom (2011).

By the Book Theatre produced the play November 25, 2014, to December 6, 2014 at the McManus Studio Theatre, London, Ontario. The production won 4 Brickenden Awards including Outstanding Drama.

In March 2016, NBC announced its intent to broadcast a live television production of A Few Good Men, starring Alec Baldwin as Col. Jessup, in the second quarter of 2018, with a teleplay adapted by Sorkin from his original script. The broadcast would be executive produced by Craig Zadan and Neil Meron, and patterned upon NBC's ongoing series of live Broadway musicals. However, NBC has yet to announce an airdate. Variety reported that the availability of Sorkin, Zadan, and Meron may have had an impact, noting that Sorkin had to represent his 2017 film Molly's Game during awards season, while Zadan and Meron (who have produced all of NBC's live musicals) were committed to other projects (such as Jesus Christ Superstar Live in Concert in 2018, and a later canceled production of Hair in 2019) being produced by NBC in lieu of Bye Bye Birdie, which had been delayed multiple times in order to accommodate Jennifer Lopez's other projects. Zadan died on August 20, 2018, at the age of 69.

A Few Good Men will have its first Broadway revival at Lincoln Center’s Vivian Beaumont Theatre in the fall of 2026, directed by Michael Arden and starring Bradley Whitford as Colonel Jessep and Tom Blyth as Daniel Kaffee. Performances are set to begin October 8 ahead of an October 29 opening night.

=== Awards and nominations ===
The Broadway production earned Megan Gallagher a 1990 Theatre World Award and a Best Actor nomination for Tom Hulce at the 44th Tony Awards.

== Source material and legacy ==
The play is based on events that took place at Guantanamo Bay Naval Base in July 1986, though various details were changed for dramatic purposes. Members of Rifle Security Company, Windward Side, 2nd Platoon believed that one of their number, Pfc. William Alvarado, was a malingerer and had informed about a Marine firing across the border into Cuba. In a retaliatory hazing (called a "Code Red"), ten Marines seized Alvarado, blindfolded him, stuffed a rag in his mouth, beat him, and shaved his head. Alvarado was seriously injured, but did not die. Of the ten Marines, seven accepted other than honorable discharges as part of a plea bargain, but three, including David Cox, refused to accept the plea bargain and went to court. Cox was defended by Don Marcari. Cox was found not guilty of aggravated battery but guilty of the misdemeanor charge of simple assault. He was sentenced to time already served in the brig and returned to active duty.

Cox was honorably discharged from the Marines in 1989. When he saw the film version of A Few Good Men, he was upset at the liberties taken with the event, most notably that the Marines in the case were dishonorably discharged, and considered suing the filmmakers. Cox disappeared in 1994. He was found murdered, along a riverbank near Medfield, Massachusetts.
