= All Over Your Face =

Single by Ronnie Dyson

from the album Brand New Day
- B-side: "Don't Need You Now"
- Released: 1983
- Length: 4:49 (12" version)
- Label: Cotillion 7-99841 (US)
- Songwriter(s): Norman Ingram
- Producer(s): Butch Ingram

Ronnie Dyson singles chronology
"Heart to Heart" (1982)	"All Over Your Face" (1983)	"You Better Be Fierce" (1983)

"All Over Your Face" is a song recorded by American singer Ronnie Dyson. The song, written and produced by Butch Ingram, was released in 1983 by Cotillion Records. The song was mixed by the Morales and Munzibai duo.

== Track listing ==
12" vinyl

- US: Cotillion / 7-99841

Side one
No.	Title	Length
1.	"All Over Your Face" (Vocal)	4:49

Side two
No.	Title	Length
1.	"Don't Need You Now" (Vocal)	5:05

== Personnel ==
- Songwriter: Norman Ingram
- Mixing: John Morales and Sergio Munzibai
- Engineer: Butch Jones

== Chart performance ==
"All Over Your Face" reached number 23 on the US R&B chart and number 16 on the US dance chart.

Chart (1983)	Peak position
US Billboard Black Singles	23
US Billboard Hot Dance Music/Club Play	16
