= Pamela Blair =

American actress (1949–2023)

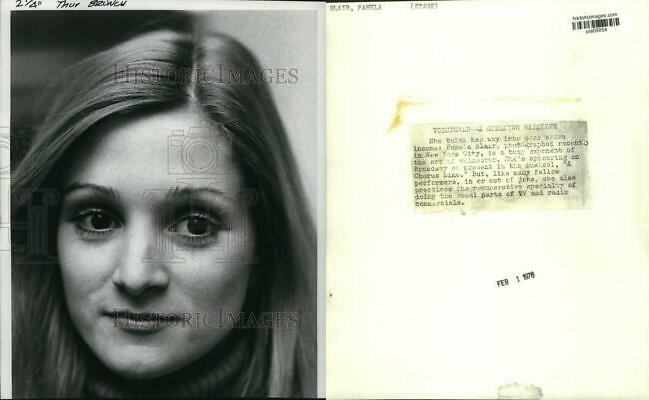
- Blair in 1976
- Born: December 5, 1949; Bennington, Vermont, U.S.
- Died: July 23, 2023 (aged 73); Phoenix, Arizona, U.S.
- Occupations: Actress, dancer
- Spouse: Don Scardino (m. 1984; div. 1991)

Pamela Blair (December 5, 1949 – July 23, 2023) was an American actress best known for originating the role of Val in the musical A Chorus Line and several appearances on American soap operas.

== Early life and career ==
Born in Bennington, Vermont, to Edgar Joseph and Geraldine Marie (née Cummings) Blair; she was raised in a small town with her pony, Tonka. She studied dance, played sports, and dreamed of becoming a Radio City Rockette in order to meet her idols, The Beatles. At age 16, she moved to New York City to attend a private school, The National Academy of Ballet, in her senior year of high school. She studied acting at HB Studio. She later met a friend at a dance class who told her Michael Bennett was looking for dancers for Promises, Promises. Pam auditioned and was hired. Blair comments, "Whenever I don't seem to be getting anywhere in this business, I try to remember that I was once a chambermaid in a small motel in Vermont." She continued to build credits with Seesaw, another Michael Bennett production, and then landed the coveted role of "Curly's Wife", the only female role in the James Earl Jones Broadway revival of Of Mice and Men which later opened at the Kennedy Center to critical acclaim. She also appeared in Sugar, the stage musical version of the film Some Like It Hot, in which she played "Sugar Kane", a role made famous by Marilyn Monroe.

== A Chorus Line and Broadway fame ==
In 1974, Blair was invited by Michael Bennett to participate in the workshops from which A Chorus Line was developed. The character of "Valerie Clark" was in large part, based on her own life, although the surgical enhancement came from another dancer. "Val was based on Mitzi Hamilton, who actually underwent surgery to enhance her figure, and Pam Blair, whose mixture of angelic appearance and ribald tongue entertained Bennett enormously". The angelic looking yet sexy Val has a foul mouth, and introduces the popular Broadway song "Dance: Ten; Looks: Three" which tells the story of an unattractive yet talented girl who uses plastic surgery to help her get cast in roles. Along with the cast, Blair won the 1976 Theatre World Award for Ensemble Performance for the show.

Blair next originated the role of "Amber" (later "Angel") in 1978's The Best Little Whorehouse in Texas. Her turn as an eager to work prostitute earned her a Drama Desk Award nomination. She can be heard on the cast recording as the lead in "Hard Candy Christmas", although the song "Bus from Amarillo" was taken from her before the show opened. Further roles on Broadway include King of Hearts (in the Geneviève Bujold role), "Clelia" in The Nerd, and "Joanne" in A Few Good Men, directed by her then estranged husband, Don Scardino.

== Television, film, and later career ==
Blair made several appearances on American soap operas such as Loving, Another World, Ryan's Hope, and All My Children, for which she received a Daytime Emmy nomination. She guest starred on such shows as Law & Order, The Cosby Show, The Days and Nights of Molly Dodd, and Sabrina the Teenage Witch. Blair guest-starred in a movie-of-the-week titled Maneater for Lifetime. She appeared opposite Jodie Foster in the TV film Svengali and in feature films Mighty Aphrodite directed by Woody Allen, 21 Grams with Sean Penn and Benicio del Toro, Before and After with Meryl Streep and Liam Neeson and Annie as the maid Annette.

Blair lived in Hollywood, California, for a time, where she landed the role of Sabrina's mother on Sabrina the Teenage Witch, although high-profile on-camera success eluded her. However, she continued to amass many regional and national credits, and still appeared in roles such as Heddi La Rue in How to Succeed in Business Without Really Trying. In 2006, she appeared in the lead role of Miss Mona with the Phoenix Theater's production of The Best Little Whorehouse in Texas, directed by Michael Barnard; she had been in the musical's original cast when it debuted.

== Personal life ==
Blair married actor and film director Don Scardino in 1984, and they divorced in 1991. She lived in New Jersey for a time, and last resided in Arizona where she owned her own Therapeutic and Myofascial Massage Studio for athletes. Blair died in Phoenix on July 23, 2023, at the age of 73.

== Credits ==
=== Theater ===
Year	Title	Role	Theater
1968	Promises, Promises	Ensemble/Clancy's Lounge Patron	Shubert Theatre
1971	Wild and Wonderful	Ensemble	Lyceum Theater
1972	Sugar	Ensemble, later Sugar Kane	Majestic Theater
1973	Seesaw	Citizen of New York	Uris Theatre
1974	Of Mice and Men	Curley's Wife	Brooks Atkinson Theatre
1975	A Chorus Line	Val	Shubert Theatre
1978	King of Hearts	Jeunefille	Minskoff Theatre
1978	The Best Little Whorehouse in Texas	Amber/Angel	46th Street Theatre
1987	The Nerd	Clelia Waldgrave	Helen Hayes Theatre
1989	A Few Good Men	Lt. Cmdr. Joanne Galloway	Music Box Theatre

=== Film ===
Year	Title	Role	Notes
1982	Annie	Annette	
1992	Me and Veronica	Dawn	
1995	Mighty Aphrodite	Greek Chorus	
1996	Beavis and Butt-Head Do America	Flight Attendant / White House Tour Guide	Voice only
1996	Before and After	Dr. Ryan's Assistant	
2003	21 Grams	Doctor	

=== Television ===
Year	Title	Role	Notes
1980	Ryan's Hope	Elizabeth Shrank Ryan	9 episodes
1983	Svengali	Trish	TV film
1983–1985	Loving	Rita Mae Bristow	4 episodes
1985	All My Children	Maida Andrews	
1989	The Cosby Show	Karen	2 episodes
1989	The Days and Nights of Molly Dodd	Alison	
1994	Another World	Bonnie Broderick	4 episodes
1994	The Cosby Mysteries	Julianne	
1994	Law & Order	Aileen Wojak	
1998	Sabrina the Teenage Witch	Sabrina's Mom	
2000	The Last Dance	Dance Teacher	TV film

== Awards ==
Theatre
Year	Award	Category	Nominated work	Result
1976	Theatre World Awards	Special Award	A Chorus Line (for Ensemble Performance)	Won
1978	Drama Desk Awards	Outstanding Featured Actress in a Musical	The Best Little Whorehouse in Texas	Nominated
1987	Daytime Emmy Awards	Outstanding Guest Performer in a Drama Series	All My Children	Nominated
