= Day Dreaming (Aretha Franklin song) =

- One of Side-A labels of US vinyl single

Single by Aretha Franklin

from the album Young, Gifted and Black
- B-side: "I've Been Loving You Too Long"
- Released: February 1972
- Studio: Criteria Studios (Miami, FL)
- Genre: Soul
- Length: 4:00 (Album version); 2:41 (7" version)
- Label: Atlantic
- Songwriter: Aretha Franklin
- Producers: Tom Dowd, Arif Mardin, Jerry Wexler

Aretha Franklin singles chronology
"Rock Steady" (1971)	"Day Dreaming" (1972)	"All the King's Horses" (1972)

"Day Dreaming" is a soul single by American singer Aretha Franklin. Released from her album Young, Gifted and Black, it spent two weeks at the top of the Hot Soul Singles chart in April 1972 and peaked at number five on the Billboard Hot 100 and number 11 on the Easy Listening singles chart. Billboard ranked it as the No. 61 song for 1972.

Donny Hathaway plays electric piano on the song and Hubert Laws plays the flute. The single version omits the jazzy daydream-like music heard at the beginning and the ending of the track on the album, because the vocals sounded too psychedelic for most radio airplay. It had been rumored the song was about Temptations' singer Dennis Edwards, which was confirmed by Franklin in 1999 on The Oprah Winfrey Show. It would be her twelfth number-one soul single while at Atlantic Records and sold more than one million copies.

== Cover versions ==
The song has been covered by many singers. On August 1, 2006, Natalie Cole released her version of "Day Dreaming" as a single from her 12th studio album Leavin'. A video accompanying the song was directed by Doug Biro, and features Cole singing with her band in front of a white background. The cover earned Cole a nomination at the 49th Annual Grammy Awards for Best Female R&B Vocal Performance, but she lost to Mary J. Blige for her 2005 single "Be Without You". Cole said she "added a little bit of a hip-hop feel" to her interpretation of the song. Cole performed "Day Dreaming" at the BET special An Evening of Stars: Tribute to Aretha Franklin along with an arrangement of Franklin's 1970 single "Call Me".
