= (If You Let Me Make Love to You Then) Why Can't I Touch You? =

"(If You Let Me Make Love To You Then) Why Can't I Touch You?"

Single by Ronnie Dyson

from the album (If You Let Me Make Love To You Then) Why Can't I Touch You?
- B-side: "Girl Don't Come"
- Released: February 20, 1970
- Studio: Sigma Sound, Philadelphia, Pennsylvania
- Genre: Soul
- Length: 3:26
- Label: Columbia
- Songwriter(s): C. C. Courtney, Peter Link
- Producer(s): Billy Jackson

Ronnie Dyson singles chronology
| "(If You Let Me Make Love To You Then) Why Can't I Touch You?" (1970) | "I Don't Wanna Cry" (1970) |

"(If You Let Me Make Love To You Then) Why Can't I Touch You?" is a song written by Charles Courtney and Peter Link. It came from the musical, Salvation.

== Ronnie Dyson recording ==
In 1970, "(If You Let Me Make Love to You Then) Why Can't I Touch You?" was recorded by Ronnie Dyson. It reached #8 on the Billboard Hot 100 and #9 on the R&B chart. It peaked at #68 in Australia. The track appeared on Dyson's debut album of the same name.
