= Soorya Krishnamoorthy =

Indian artist and philanthropist (1947/1948–2026)

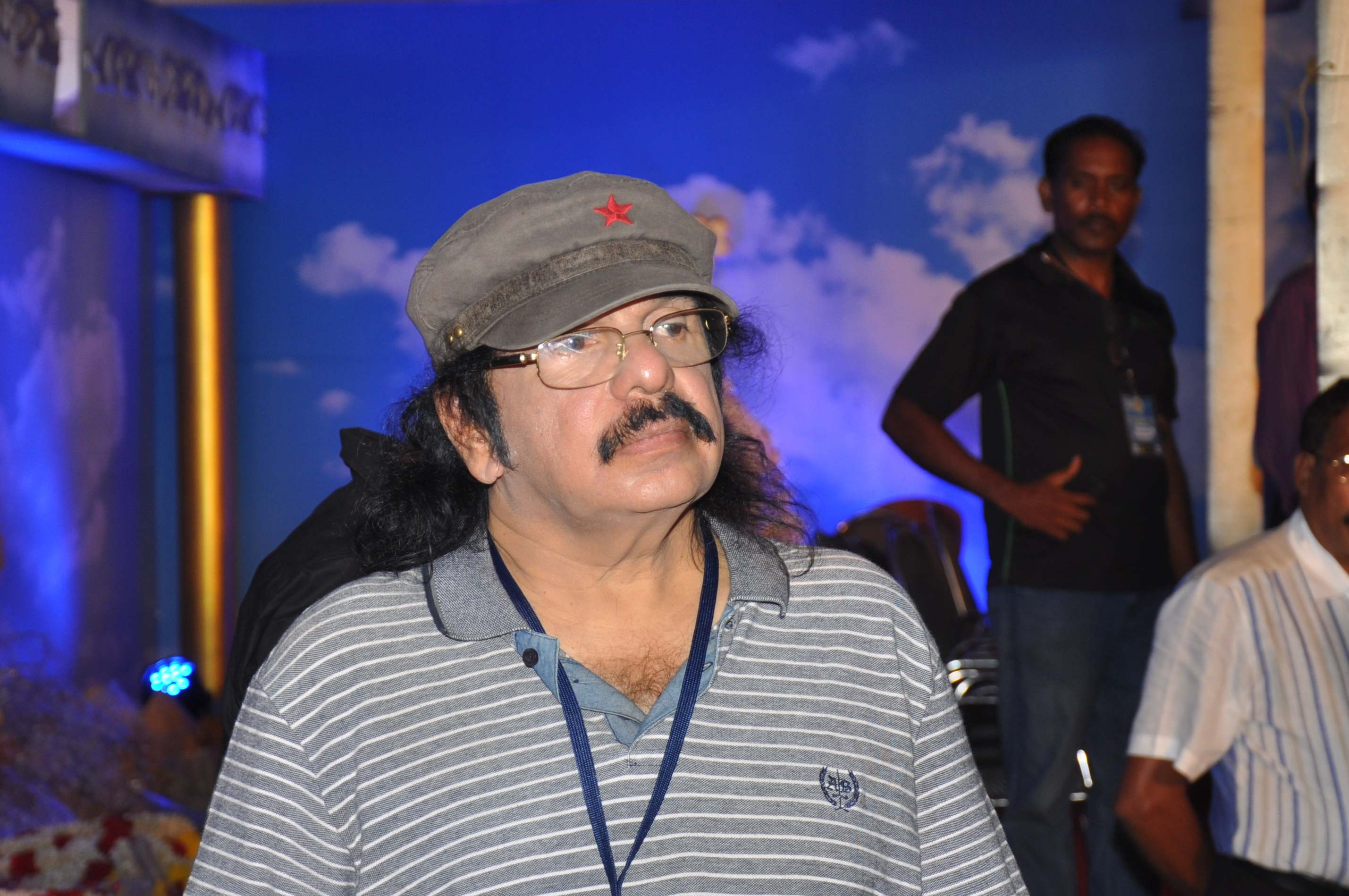
- Born: 24 December 1947
- Died: 23 September 2026 (aged 78); Thiruvananthapuram, Kerala, India
- Other name: Nataraja Krishnamoorthy
- Occupations: Artist, philanthropist and scientist
- Awards: National Award for Stage Craft and Direction of President of India

Soorya Krishnamoorthy (24 December 1947 – 23 September 2026), also known as Nataraja Krishnamoorthy, was an Indian artist, philanthropist and scientist. He was the chairman of Kerala Sangeetha Nataka Academy and founder of Soorya Stage and Film Society. In 1996, Krishnamoorthy was honoured with the National Award for Stage Craft and Direction of President of India and was also conferred the highest honours from Kerala, Tamil Nadu and Puducherry governments. In 2016, He was nominated for Padma Awards by Amjad Ali Khan. In 2023, he was honoured with Kerala Prabha Award, the second-highest honour given by the Government of Kerala.

== Career ==
Krishnamoorthy served as the director of the Kerala State Film Development Corporation for three terms and as a member of the India National Film Award Committee, the Kerala State Film Award Committee, the NFDC Script Committee and the National Committee for Selecting Indian Panorama Films. He was also a member of the Expert Committee of the Department of Culture for the Government of India where he was instrumental in advancing the cultural policy of the country and served as the Chairman of the Kerala Sangeetha Nataka Akademi.

After graduating from the TKM College of Engineering in Kollam, in Electrical Engineering, in 1972, he joined the Indian Space Research Organization (ISRO) as a scientist/engineer and in 1977, he founded the Soorya Festival which is organised by his organization Soorya Music & Dance Festival. Besides that, he also wrote a screenplay for the 2011 Indian courtroom drama film Melvilasom.

In 2006, he was the chairman, of the Film Awards Jury of the John Abraham Awards and the P. Padmarajan Award. He was also a member of the Doordarshan Advisory Committee, the Expert Committee of the Department of Culture, Govt. of India and the steering committee formed by the Department of Culture, Govt. of India, to evolve the cultural policy of the country.

== Death ==
Krishnamoorthy died on 23 September 2026, at the age of 78, while undergoing treatment at a hospital in Thiruvananthapuram.

== Awards ==
- 1994: "Prathiba Pranam" Award for Outstanding Creative Artiste by the Government of Kerala
- 1994: John Abraham Award for the best-run film Society of Country by the Federation of Film Societies of India.
- 2001: Selected as one in 101 world-renowned living Keralites of the millennium by the Government of Kerala
- 2003: "Man of the Year" for the contribution made in the field of art by Limca Book of Records
- 2004: "Special Recognition" Award for overall contribution in the field of art and culture by the Government of Kerala
- 2006: "Kalaimamani" Award for Stage Craft and Direction by the Government of Tamil Nadu
- 2023: Lifetime Achievement Award from Soor Mandir of Odisha.
