= Ebers =

Ebers is a surname. Notable people with the surname include:

- Edith Ebers (1894–1974), German geologist, glaciologist
- Jewell James Ebers (1921–1959), American electrical engineer
- John Ebers (1778–1858), English operatic manager
- Georg Ebers (1837–1898), German Egyptologist and novelist

== See also ==
- Ebers Papyrus, an Ancient Egyptian papyrus purchased by Georg Ebers
