= One Man Band (Ronnie Dyson album) =

Studio album by Ronnie Dyson
- Released: 1973
- Recorded: 1973
- Genre: Soul
- Label: Columbia
- Producer: Thom Bell, Billy Jackson, Stan Vincent

Ronnie Dyson chronology
(If You Let Me Make Love To You Then) Why Can't I Touch You? (1970)	One Man Band (1973)	The More You Do It (1976)

One Man Band is the second album by soul singer Ronnie Dyson on Columbia. Released in 1973, it included four tracks produced by top Philly Sound producer-arranger, Thom Bell. The rest of the album featured previously recorded tracks re-mixed by Bell's collaborator, Linda Creed, including the singer's earlier hit, When You Get Right Down To It and single release, A Wednesday In Your Garden.

== Reception ==
Professional ratings
Review scores
Source	Rating
Allmusic	4/5 stars

== Track listing ==
No.	Title	Writer(s)	Length
1.	"One Man Band (Plays All Alone)"	Thom Bell; Linda Creed	3:38
2.	"I Think I'll Tell Her"	Thom Bell; Linda Creed	4:04
3.	"Just Don't Want to Be Lonely"	Vinnie Barrett; Bobby Eli; John Freeman	3:11
4.	"Give In To Love"	Thom Bell; Linda Creed	4:51
5.	"When You Get Right Down To It"	Barry Mann	2:47
6.	"A Wednesday In Your Garden"	Randy Bachman	3:17
7.	"Something"	George Harrison	2:49
8.	"Girl Don't Come"	Chris Andrews	2:45
9.	"Point Of No Return"	Thom Bell; Linda Creed	2:08
10.	"The Love Of A Woman"	Howard Greenfield; Neil Sedaka	2:41

== Charts ==
Year	Album	Chart positions	
Year	Album	US	US R&B
1973	One Man Band	142	34

=== Singles ===
Year	Single	Chart positions		
Year	Single	US	US R&B	US Dance
1973	"Just Don't Want To Be Lonely"	60	29	—
1973	"One Man Band (Plays All Alone)"	28	15	—
