= El Monte Golf Course Clubhouse =

- U.S. National Register of Historic Places
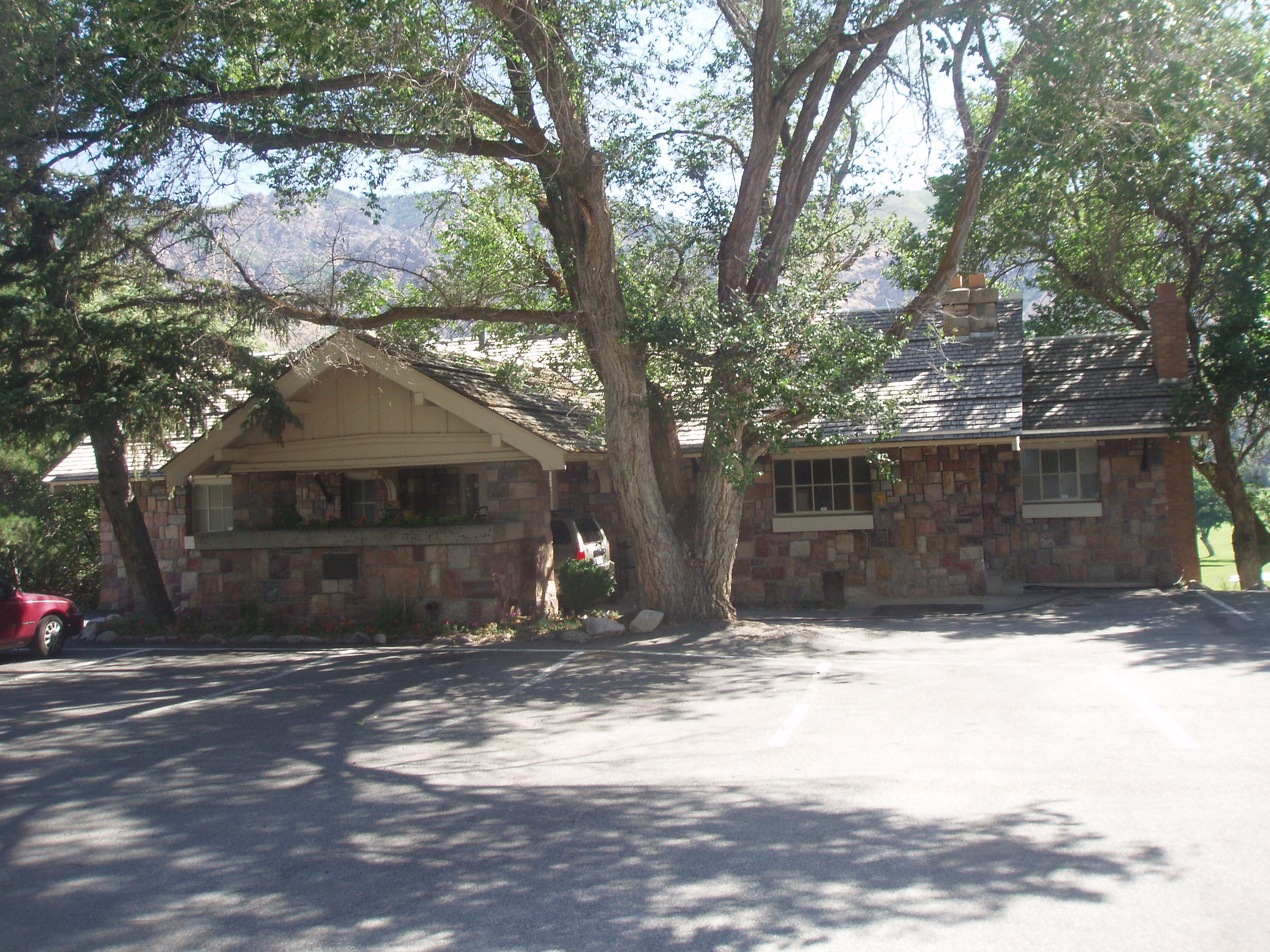
- The clubhouse in 2009

- Location within Utah Location within the United States
- Location: 1300 Valley Drive, Ogden, Utah
- Coordinates: 41°14′01″N 111°56′40″W
- Area: less than one acre
- Built: 1934
- Architect: Eber F. Piers
- Architectural style: Bungalow/craftsman
- MPS: Public Works Buildings TR
- NRHP reference No.: 85000823
- Added to NRHP: April 1, 1985

El Monte Golf Course Clubhouse is a historic building in Ogden, Utah. It was built in 1934–1935, and designed in the American Craftsman style by architect Eber F. Piers. It has been listed on the National Register of Historic Places since April 1, 1985.
