= Salvation (musical) =

- The cover of the original-cast album for Salvation.
- Music: Peter Link & C.C. Courtney
- Lyrics: Peter Link & C.C. Courtney
- Book: Peter Link & C.C. Courtney
- Productions: 1969 Off-Broadway

Salvation is a 1969 off-Broadway rock musical with music, lyrics, and book by Peter Link & C.C. Courtney. The production opened on September 24, 1969, at the Jan Hus Playhouse and ended on April 19, 1970, after 239 performances.

== Production ==
The idea came from Courtney and his frustration with organized religion. Both Link and he wrote the show, and appeared in it as well. Courtney said of the show, "I was walking through Central Park, and the whole show just sort of came to me on that 20-minute walk. I usually did the concept and the book and the lyrics, and Peter did the music. So I hit him with the idea and he was hot to do that. In fact, he probably was more anxious to do it than I was...He's very productive. So I said let's do it, and I started working on the lyrics and giving them to him as fast as I could. So it became, in effect, well, the plot is pretty much my life story." Both were actors looking for the next thing. Courtney was appearing on the NBC daytime drama The Doctors. At the same time, Link was on the CBS daytime drama As the World Turns as the pot-smoking, troubled Tom Hughes. Afterwards, Link would join Hair and replace Gerome Ragni as Berger.

The show was written in two weeks, and it first premiered in a showcase production at The Village Gate, financed by Courtney and Link. It opened on March 11, 1969, and was given a positive review by New York Times columnist Lawrence Van Gelder. It was picked up by producer David Black, who had produced George M!, and got them booked at the Mitzi E. Newhouse Theater by the Lincoln Center for the Performing Arts, but unfortunately, the booking was canceled, supposedly by the director, Robert Montgomery. Courtney said of the incident, "I heard lots or rumors about what happened, mainly that Robert Montgomery didn't like this kind of filthy, disgusting stuff--that's why we didn't get to open at Lincoln Center."

Black got the musical moved to the Jan Hus Playhouse for its off-Broadway run, starting on September 24, 1969, and ending on April 19, 1970, after 239 performances. It earned a profit of $55,000. Black convinced Link and Courtney to close the New York production for the summer, bring it to Los Angeles, and try to reopen it in the fall in a Broadway theatre. Due to bad casting, Salvation never get a chance on Broadway. Two efforts to help the show came too late. The first was the cast album by Capitol Records, produced by Nick Venet, which had begun to do well. The second was singer Ronnie Dyson (Hair), who recorded a single of "(If You Let Me Make Love to You Then) Why Can't I Touch You?", which sold over a million copies and peaked at #8 in 1970.

== Synopsis ==
The story follows a young man who is a hardshell-Baptist. He searches, trying to figure out how relevant religion is to men and women and to society as a whole. He becomes enthralled by the pageantry and the ritual of Roman Catholicism. But he is unenthusiastic about hearing others confess their sins and reveal themselves to him. He begins to search for something else, becoming a Timothy Leary-like guru.

== Musical Numbers ==
- "Overture"
- "Salvation"
- "In Between"
- "1001"
- "Honest Confession Is Good For The Soul"
- "Ballin'"
- "Let The Moment Slip By"
- "Gina"
- "(If You Let Me Make Love to You Then) Why Can't I Touch You?"
- "There Ain't No Flies On Jesus"
- "Deadalus"
- "For Ever"
- "Footloose Youth And Fancy Free"
- "Schwartz"
- "Let's Get Lost In Now"
- "Back To Genesis"
- "Tomorrow Is The First Day Of The Rest Of My Life"

== Cast and Crew ==
The show was directed by Paul Aaron, musically directed by Kirk Nurock, and dance movement by Kathryn Posin. The musicians, known as "Nobody Else", consisted of Eric Cohen (Drums), Dickie Franks (Electric Guitar), Charles Sullivan (Trumpet), John Buck Wilkin (Acoustic Guitar), Ronald Finck (Saxophone), Wayne Kirby (Bass), and Kirk Nurock (Piano).

The original cast consisted of the show's creators, Peter Link (Farley) and C.C. Courtney (Monday), as well as Yolande Bavan (Ranee), Joe Morton (Mark), Boni Enten (Boo), Annie Rachel (Dierdre), Marta Heflin (Betty Lou), and Chapman Roberts (Leroy). Notable actors to join the cast were Barry Bostwick (who replaced Courtney), and Bette Midler.

== Awards ==
- Drama Desk Most Promising Award
- Variety balloting for Best Composer and Best Lyricist
