= Robert Eber =

American sound engineer

- Occupation: Sound engineer
- Years active: 1978 – present

Robert Eber is an American sound engineer. He was nominated for an Academy Award in the category Best Sound for the film A Few Good Men. He has worked on more than 80 films since 1978.

== Selected filmography ==
- A Few Good Men (1992)
