= Eber F. Piers =

American architect

- Born: June 2, 1889; Denver, Colorado, U.S.
- Died: December 20, 1961; Ogden, Utah, U.S.
- Occupation: Architect

Eber F. Piers (June 2, 1889 - December 20, 1961) was an American architect. Between 1911 and 1952, he designed more than 300 buildings in or around Ogden, Utah, including the NRHP-listed El Monte Golf Course Clubhouse in 1934–1935.

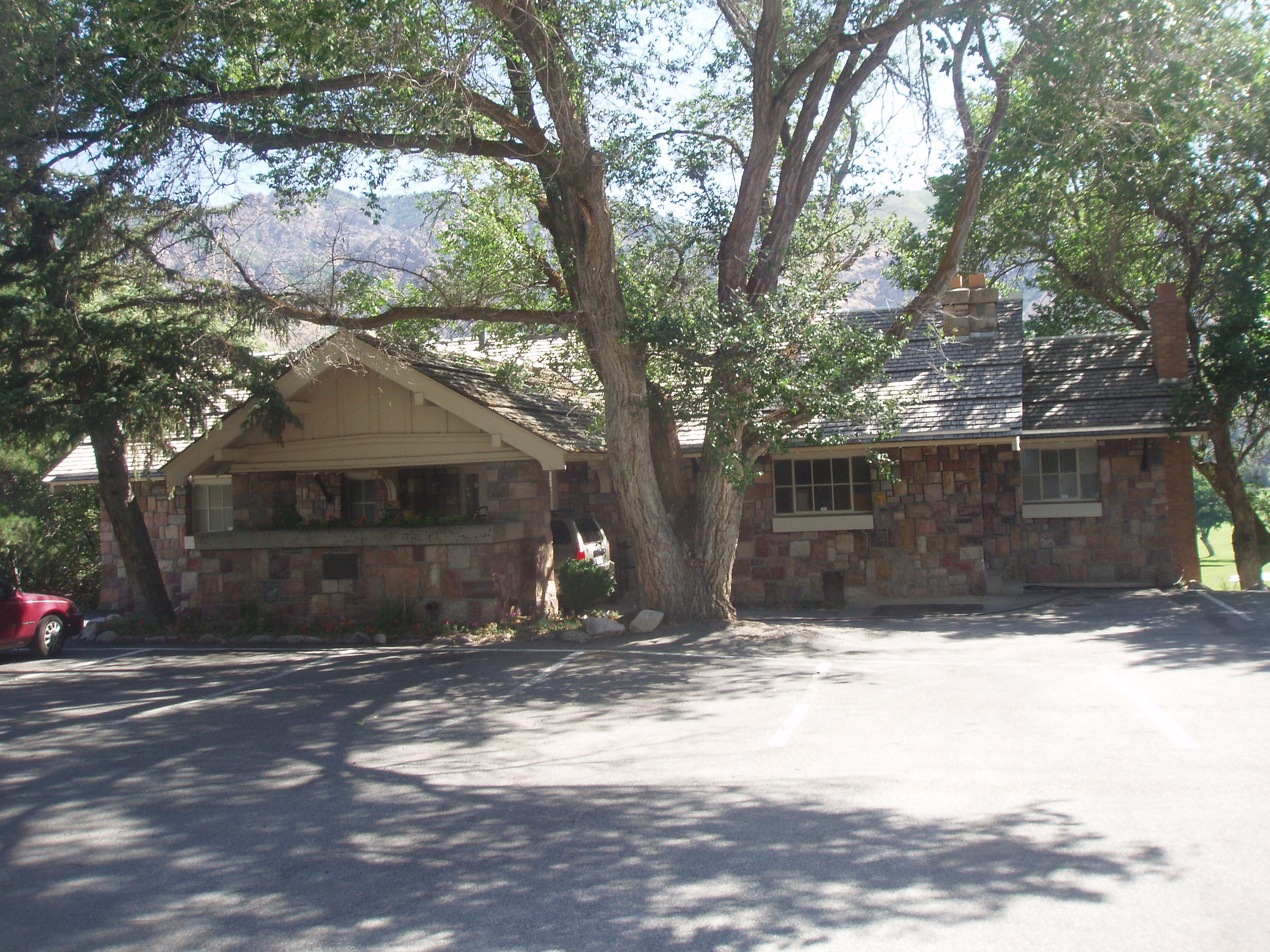
The El Monte Golf Course Clubhouse.
