= Edith Ebers =

German geologist (1894–1974)

- Born: Edith Heirich; 4 December 1894; Nuremberg
- Died: 13 September 1974 (aged 79); Weilheim in Oberbayern
- Burial place: Seeshaupt
- Occupations: Geologist and conservationist
- Known for: Glacial Maiden, Weissbach Glacier Garden
- Spouse: Hermann Ebers

Edith Ebers (4 December 1894–13 September 1974), née Heirich, was a German Quaternary geologist and conservationist. She became widely known for personally stopping the 1935 detonation of rocky outcroppings that blocked a new Alpine road between the Bavarian towns of Traunstein and Bad Reichenhall. The detonations would have destroyed the exposed rocks that exhibited glacial striations. Thereafter, she became known as the Glacier Fräulein (in English: Glacier Maiden).

== Biography ==
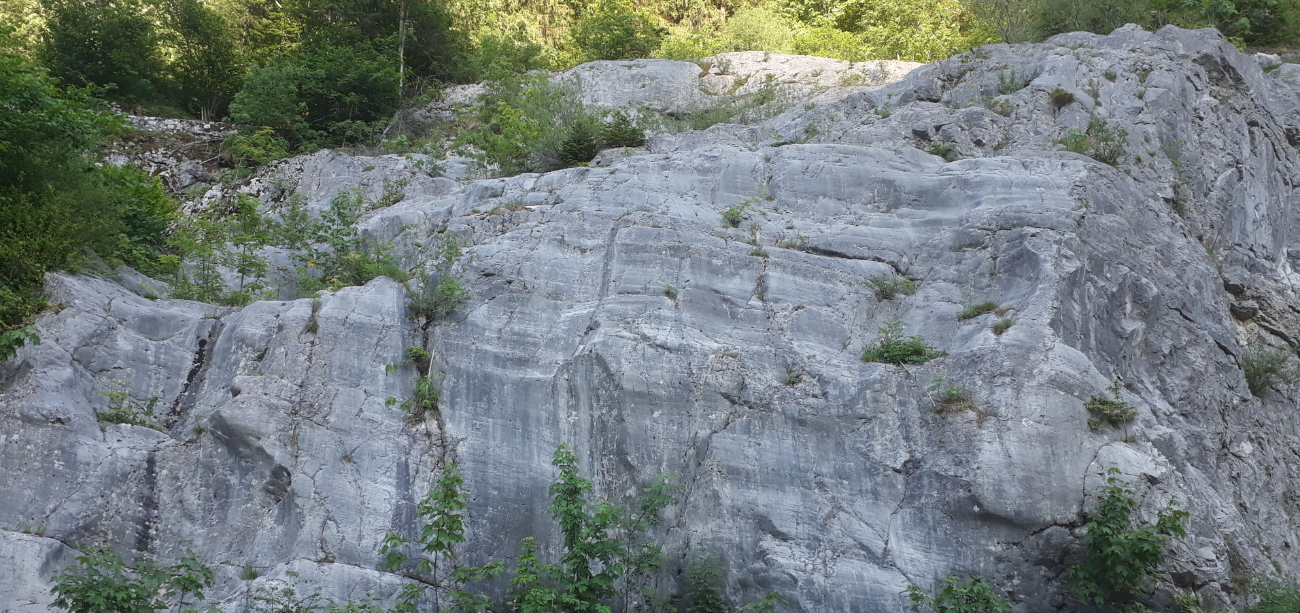
Rockface showing glacial striations and moulins formed by the Saalach Glacier at the end of the last glaciation about 12,000 years ago.

Edith Heirich was born in 1894 in Nuremberg, the eldest child of Karl Heirich and Hermine Knote who hailed from "the illustrious Knote family." Her uncle was the German opera singer Heinrich Knote. Edith's mother was a talented woman who divorced her husband and raised her children alone. Edith studied geology from 1913 to 1919, and in 1925 became one of the few women to earn a doctorate. She subsequently built a substantial reputation in the field of glaciology.

=== Glacier Maiden ===
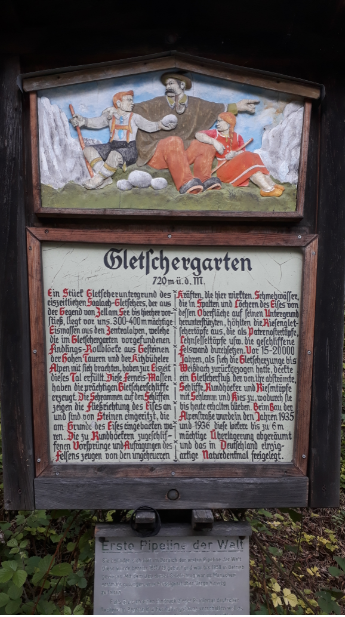
Glacier Garden display along the German Alpine Road.

During blasting operations for the construction of the German Alpine Road in 1936 between Traunstein and Reichenhall, she discovered glacial striation in the Partnach Limestone of the Weissbach Valley, caused by the Saalach Glacier, a branch of the Salzach Glacier, during the Würm glaciation. The incident was described in a newspaper:

"But Miss, you can’t.” An elderly worker tries in vain to stop the frail young woman. He is part of a team that was supposed to detonate mines in 1935 to clear the Alpine road between the Bavarian towns of Traunstein and Bad Reichenhall. The “Miss” had slammed on the brakes on her Sachs motorcycle, jumped onto the rocks and hit them with a geologist’s hammer. “Yes, folks, don’t you see? This is a natural wonder you are destroying! These are glacial striations! Look how the rock shines! Over thousands of years, ice and water have polished it to a shine! Don’t you see the deep striations on the shiny surface? They were carved by sharp stones in the ice!”

Because of her intervention, the blasting operations were halted, and parts of the glacial remnants were placed under conservation. Today, the glacial striation is a geotope and is preserved as the Weissbach Glacier Garden.

She went on to research the formation of drumlins as well as the glaciation history and glacial geomorphology of the Bavarian Alpine foreland. She was also involved in landscape architecture and public relations and published research on Alpine rock carvings.

She became the main instigator of the foundation of the International Commission for the Protection of the Alps (CIPRA).

=== Personal life ===
In the early 1920s, she became the second wife of the Munich painter Hermann Ebers (1881–1955) and changed her name to Edith Ebers. From 1934 the couple lived in Haunshofen near Weilheim.

She died on 13 September 1974 and was buried in the Ebers family crypt in Seeshaupt.

=== Honors ===
In 1962, Edith Ebers received an honorary award worth 5,000 German marks for her scientific achievements. She was a longtime member of the German Quaternary Association (DEUQUA) and was made an honorary member in 1964.

The Bavarian Nature Conservation Association awarded her honorary membership in 1970.

"Dr. Edith Ebers Strasse" in Wielenbach is a street named after her, as is "Edith Ebers Weg" in Neufahrn near Freising (formerly the street was called Konrad-Lorenz-Weg; the renaming took place in 2023 because of Lorenz's Nazi past).

== Selected works ==
- The results of drumlin research to date: A monograph on drumlins. 1925
- The Ice Age in the Landscape of the Bavarian Alpine Foreland. 1934
- The diluvial glaciation of the Bavarian Traun region. 1939
- New Tasks of the Nature Conservation Movement. Nature Conservation Issues No. 1. 1947
- The Glacier Garden on the German Alpine Road. 1952
- From the Great Ice Age. 1957
- Ice Age Hiking and Wonder Booklet for the Bavarian Alpine Foreland. 1959
- The rock art area in the Höll am Warscheneck and its postglacial geological history. 1969
