= The More You Do It =

Studio album by Ronnie Dyson
- Released: 1976
- Recorded: 1976 (Curtom Studios & PS Recording Studios Chicago, Illinois)
- Genre: Soul
- Label: Columbia
- Producer: Chuck Jackson, Marvin Yancy

Ronnie Dyson chronology
One Man Band (1973)	The More You Do It (1976)	Love In All Flavors (1977)

The More You Do It is the third album by soul singer Ronnie Dyson. It was released in 1976, and produced by Chuck Jackson and Marvin Yancy.

== Reception ==
Professional ratings
Review scores
Source	Rating
Allmusic	3/5 stars

== Track listing ==
No.	Title	Writer(s)	Length
1.	"A Song For You"	Leon Russell	4:53
2.	"Close To You"	Chuck Jackson; Marvin Yancy	2:55
3.	"The More You Do It (The More I Like It Done To Me)"	Chuck Jackson; Marvin Yancy	3:10
4.	"You Set My Spirits Free"	Chuck Jackson; Marvin Yancy	6:48
5.	"You And Me"	Chuck Jackson; Marvin Yancy	3:12
6.	"Love Won't Let Me Wait"	Vinnie Barrett; Bobby Eli	3:37
7.	"Lovin' Feelin'"	Billy Jackson	3:23
8.	"Won't You Come Stay With Me"	Chuck Jackson; Marvin Yancy	3:27
9.	"Jive Talkin'"	Barry Gibb; Maurice Gibb; Robin Gibb	2:59

== Charts ==
Year	Album	Chart positions	
Year	Album	US	US R&B
1976	The More You Do It	—	30

=== Singles ===
Year	Single	Chart positions		
Year	Single	US	US R&B	US Dance
1976	"The More You Do It (The More I Like It Done To Me)"	62	6	—
1977	"Close To You"	—	75	—
