= SMS Eber =

Two ships of the German Kaiserliche Marine (Imperial Navy) have been named SMS Eber:

- SMS Eber (1887), a German gunboat launched in 1887
- SMS Eber (1903), a German gunboat launched in 1903
