= Brent Nicholson Earle =

American AIDS activist

Brent Nicholson Earle (born 21 January 1951) is an early activist in the effort to promote awareness and prevent the spread of AIDS, notable for his long-distance runs to support his cause and raise money for AIDS service organizations.

People Magazine named Earle one of its "20 individuals who shaped the 80's." His first major run, in 1986–87, the American Run for the End of AIDS (A.R.E.A.), started and ended in New York City, covering 9,000 miles around the perimeter of the United States. His second, in 1990, went from San Francisco to Vancouver, the site of Gay Games III. His third, in 1994, this time leading a seven-person team and using roller skates, went from San Francisco to New York, site of Gay Games IV. He is also active with ACT UP and was made an Honorary Life Member of the Federation of Gay Games. In 2010 he was named as the winner of the Tom Waddell Award, the highest honor of the Federation of the Gay Games. He also created the International Rainbow Memorial Run, which carries a rainbow flag from San Francisco around the world to the city hosting the current Gay Games. It promotes both AIDS and breast cancer prevention.

In his professional life, he worked in New York City as an actor, writer, stage manager, lecturer, archivist, photographer, optical designer, curator and art gallery administrator.

He is the subject of the 2023 feature documentary entitled "For the Love of Friends, " available on PBS. In 2020, he returned to the stage in New York as an actor and playwright in "For the Love of Friends: A story about the life and work of Brent Nicholson Earle."

He was born in Niagara Falls, New York, and grew up in nearby Lockport, New York. As of 2026, he is still an AIDS activist in New York City.
