= Eber ben Pethahiah =

Moravian scholar

Eber ben Pethahiah (Hebrew: עבר בן פתחיה; fl. early 18th century) was a scholar from Uherský Brod, Moravia. Moritz Steinschneider indicates the possibility of the name being merely a pseudonym. It appears on the title-page of Mar'eh ha-Ketab ve-Rashe Tebot, a guide to Judeo-German and its abbreviations, apparently abridged from a work of Hayyim ben Menahem of Glogau.
