= King of Hearts (musical) =

- Original Broadway Cast Recording
- Music: Peter Link
- Lyrics: Jacob Brackman
- Book: Joseph Stein
- Basis: 1966 film the same name
- Productions: 1978 Boston (try-out); 1978 Broadway

King of Hearts is a 1978 musical with a book by Joseph Stein, lyrics by Jacob Brackman, and music by Peter Link, orchestrated by Bill Brohn. It is based on the 1966 anti-war cult film of the same name.

== Synopsis ==
Set in the fictional French town of DuTemps in September 1918, shortly before the end of World War I, its protagonist is Private Johnny Perkins, whose mission is to defuse a bomb intended to destroy the entire village. All the local residents have fled, leaving behind only the cheerful inmates of the insane asylum, who happily take over the town and proclaim Johnny their King of Hearts. The show raises the question of who is more insane, the asylum's patients or those who wage war.

== Background ==
The Broadway production was directed and choreographed by Ron Field. After a Boston tryout at the Colonial Theatre and six Broadway previews, it opened on October 22, 1978 at the Minskoff Theatre and ran for 48 performances. The cast included Don Scardino as Johnny and Pamela Blair, Bob Gunton, and Millicent Martin in supporting roles. Santo Loquasto designed the sets.

New York City was in the midst of a three-month-long newspaper strike when the musical opened, and the lack of advertising and print reviews might have contributed to its quick demise. Of it, musical theatre historian Ken Mandelbaum recalls, "its score was only so-so; its theme (the insane are somehow "saner" than the sane) had a '60s feel; and its cast was not particularly distinctive." Critic and musical historian Peter Filichia calls it a "noble failure".

Two recordings of the score have been released: one, released on the Original Cast label, featuring the original Broadway cast and another with the 1982 Los Angeles cast.

In 2002 the Goodspeed revival, directed by Gabriel Barre, used the script as the authors, librettist Steve Tesich and songwriters Link and Brackman first intended, before other "doctors" were brought in.

== Original cast and characters ==
Character	Broadway (1978)
Johnny Parkins	Don Scardino
Madeleine	Millicent Martin
Jeunefille	Pamela Blair
Demosthenes	Gary Morgan
Raoul	Bob Gunton
Claude	Gordon Joseph Weiss
Genevieve	Mitzi Hamilton
Lieutenant McNeill	Jay Devlin
DuBac	Michael McCarty
Kapitan Kost	Alexander Orfaly
Henri	Will Roy
Marie-Claire	Julia McKeegan
M. Clichy	David Thomas

== Song list ==
Act I

- "A Stain on the Name (of St. Anne's)" – Inmates
- "Deja Vu" – Madeleine
- "Promenade (The Transformation)" – Inmates
- "Turn Around" – Madeleine and Inmates
- "Nothing, Only Love" – Jeunefille, Johnny and Madeleine
- "King of Hearts" – Demosthenes, Jeunefille, Raoul, Madeleine and Inmates
- "Close Upon the Hour" – Johnny
- "A Brand New Day (The Coronation)" – DuBac, Johnny and Inmates

Act II

- "Le Grand Cirque de Provence" – Raoul and Inmates
- "Hey, Look at Me, Mrs. Draba" – Johnny
- "Going Home Tomorrow" – Soldiers
- "Somewhere is Here" – Madeleine
- "Nothing, Only Love" (Reprise) – Raoul, Madeleine, Jeunefille and Johnny
- "March, March, March" – Johnny and Inmates

== Awards and nominations ==
=== Original Broadway Production ===
Year	Award Ceremony	Category	Nominee	Result
1979	Tony Award	Best Performance by a Featured Actress in a Musical	Millicent Martin	Nominated
1979	Drama Desk Award	Outstanding Featured Actor in a Musical	Bob Gunton	Nominated
1979	Drama Desk Award	Outstanding Set Design	Santo Loquasto	Nominated
1979	Drama Desk Award	Outstanding Costume Design	Patricia Zipprodt	Won
