= A Few Good Men =

1992 film by Rob Reiner

- Theatrical release poster
- Directed by: Rob Reiner
- Screenplay by: Aaron Sorkin
- Based on: A Few Good Men by Aaron Sorkin
- Produced by: Rob Reiner; David Brown; Andrew Scheinman
- Starring: Tom Cruise; Jack Nicholson; Demi Moore; Kevin Bacon; Kevin Pollak; James Marshall; J. T. Walsh; Kiefer Sutherland
- Cinematography: Robert Richardson
- Edited by: Robert Leighton
- Music by: Marc Shaiman
- Production company: Castle Rock Entertainment
- Distributed by: Columbia Pictures
- Release dates: December 9, 1992 (Westwood, Los Angeles); December 11, 1992 (United States)
- Running time: 138 minutes
- Country: United States
- Language: English
- Budget: $33–40 million
- Box office: $243.2 million

A Few Good Men is a 1992 American legal drama film, produced and directed by Rob Reiner and written by Aaron Sorkin, who adapted his 1989 play. It stars an ensemble cast including Tom Cruise, Jack Nicholson, Demi Moore, Kevin Bacon, Kevin Pollak, J. T. Walsh, Cuba Gooding Jr., and Kiefer Sutherland. The plot follows the court-martial of two U.S. Marines charged with the murder of a fellow Marine and the tribulations of their lawyers as they prepare a case.

A Few Good Men premiered on December 9, 1992, at Westwood, Los Angeles, and was released by Columbia Pictures in the United States on December 11. It received positive reviews and grossed $243 million on a budget of $40 million. The film was nominated for four Academy Awards, including Best Picture.

== Plot ==
At Guantanamo Bay Naval Base in Cuba, United States Marine Private William Santiago dies after being tied up and beaten in the middle of the night. Lance Corporal Harold Dawson and Private First Class Louden Downey face court-martial, accused of murder. Their defense is assigned to United States Navy JAG Corps lieutenant (junior grade) Daniel Kaffee, who has a record of expedient plea bargains but no courtroom experience. Santiago died after breaking the chain of command to ask for a transfer. The base's second-in-command, Lieutenant Colonel Matthew Markinson, advocated for it, but the base commander, Colonel Nathan Jessep, ordered Santiago's platoon commander, First Lieutenant Jonathan Kendrick, to "train" Santiago on the grounds that the entire platoon is at fault for Santiago's substandard performance.

Kaffee's co-counsel, Lieutenant Commander Joanne Galloway, suspects Dawson and Downey carried out a "code red" violent extrajudicial punishment. Galloway is bothered by Kaffee's blasé approach, and Kaffee resents Galloway's interference. Kaffee and Galloway question Jessep and others at Guantanamo Bay and are met with contempt. Kaffee negotiates a plea bargain with the prosecutor, US Marine Judge Advocate Captain Jack Ross. Dawson and Downey would be sentenced to two years for involuntary manslaughter, including six months of confinement, enabling them to avoid a possible life sentence if convicted at trial. Dawson is openly disrespectful of Kaffee, and Dawson and Downey refuse the "dishonorable" deal, insisting Kendrick gave them the "code red" order and that they never intended to kill Santiago.

Initially intending to be removed as defense counsel, Kaffee unexpectedly enters not guilty pleas at the arraignment. Markinson secretly meets Kaffee and says Jessep never ordered Santiago's transfer. The defense establishes that Dawson had a motive to implement the order; he previously received a negative performance review from Kendrick and was denied promotion after disobeying an order and smuggling food to a confined marine who was restricted to water and vitamins. Through Downey, Kaffee proves that illegal "code reds" had previously been ordered.

Under cross-examination, Downey admits he was not present when Kendrick gave the supposed "code red" order, so he cannot verify Dawson's account. Ashamed that he failed to protect Santiago and unwilling to testify against Jessep, Markinson commits suicide. Kaffee laments the loss of Markinson's testimony and his decision to risk long sentences for Dawson and Downey. Co-counsel Lieutenant (junior grade) Sam Weinberg recommends not calling Jessep as a witness but Galloway encourages Kaffee to put him on the stand, despite the possibility of a court-martial if he challenges a high-ranking officer without evidence. After Weinberg and Galloway leave, Kaffee has an epiphany while looking into his closet. He runs outside to tell them he will call Jessep as a witness.

In court, Jessep is unnerved when Kaffee points out an inconsistency in his testimony – that Guantanamo marines would never disobey his order to "not touch Santiago" yet he planned to move Santiago off the base because he feared for Santiago's safety. Kaffee also questions Jessep's claim that Santiago was to be put on a flight to the US because of Kaffee's realization that the uniforms and personal effects in Santiago's wall locker were not packed on the night he died despite Santiago supposedly being scheduled to depart at six o'clock in the morning. Frustrated by the exposure of his lies and the intensity of Kaffee's questions, Jessep extols the military's – and his – importance to national security, angrily exclaiming, "You can't handle the truth!" Kaffee pointedly asks if Jessep ordered the "code red", which Jessep heatedly admits. Jessep is arrested, then tries to assault Kaffee. He is restrained by military police and is read his rights.

Dawson and Downey are cleared of murder and conspiracy but convicted of "conduct unbecoming" and will be dishonorably discharged. Downey does not understand what they did wrong; Dawson says they failed to defend those who were unable to fight for themselves. Kaffee tells Dawson it is not necessary to wear rank insignia on one's arm to have honor. Dawson demonstrates newfound respect for Kaffee and acknowledges his status as an officer by rendering a salute. Kaffee and Ross exchange pleasantries before Ross departs to arrest Kendrick for perjury and conspiracy.

== Cast ==
- Tom Cruise as Lieutenant (junior grade) Daniel Kaffee, USN, JAG Corps
- Jack Nicholson as Colonel Nathan R. Jessep, USMC
- Demi Moore as Lieutenant Commander Joanne Galloway, USN, JAG Corps
- Kevin Bacon as Captain Jack Ross, USMC, Judge Advocate Division
- Kiefer Sutherland as First Lieutenant Jonathan James Kendrick, USMC
- Kevin Pollak as Lieutenant (junior grade) Sam Weinberg, USN, JAG Corps
- Wolfgang Bodison as Lance Corporal Harold W. Dawson, USMC
- James Marshall as Private First Class Louden Downey, USMC
- J. T. Walsh as Lieutenant Colonel Matthew Andrew Markinson, USMC
- J. A. Preston as Judge (Colonel) Julius Alexander Randolph, USMC
- Michael DeLorenzo as Private First Class William Santiago, USMC
- Noah Wyle as Corporal Jeffrey Owen Barnes, USMC
- Cuba Gooding Jr. as Corporal Carl Edward Hammaker, USMC
- Xander Berkeley as Captain Whitaker, USN
- Matt Craven as Lieutenant Dave Spradling, USN, JAG Corps
- John M. Jackson as Captain West, USN, JAG Corps
- Christopher Guest as Commander (Dr.) Stone, USN, MC
- David Bowe as Commander Jerry Gibbs, USN JAG Corps
- Joshua Malina as Tom, Jessep's clerk
- Harry Caesar as Luther
- Arthur Senzy as Robert C. McGuire, Special Agent - NIS

== Inspiration ==
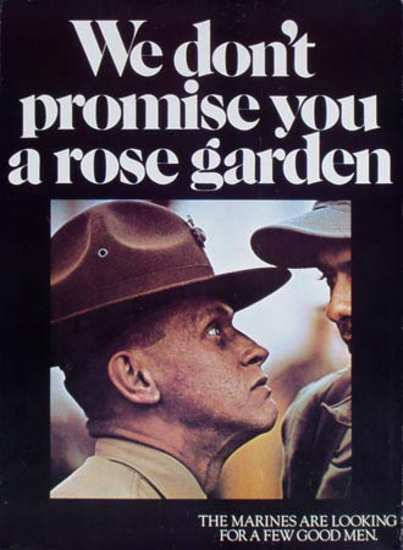
The "Rose Garden" poster was the first in a series of posters with a slogan that read "The Marines are looking for a few good men," a recruiting campaign that ran from late 1971 until mid-1984.

The title A Few Good Men refers to a marines recruitment slogan.

Screenwriter Aaron Sorkin was inspired to write the source play, A Few Good Men, from a phone conversation with his sister Deborah. A graduate of Boston University Law School, she had signed up for a three-year stint with the U.S. Navy Judge Advocate General's Corps. She said that she was going to Guantanamo Bay to defend a group of Marines who had nearly killed a fellow Marine in a hazing ordered by a superior officer. While the film does not inform its audience that it is inspired by a true story, many of the facts of the case that Deborah Sorkin was involved in are directly included in the play and film. This later led to a lawsuit against Castle Rock by the real-life Marines whose actions inspired the story.

In reality, a code red was allegedly ordered in September 1986 against Private First Class (PFC) William Alvarado, who had written letters to a Texas Congressman and others, complaining of poor conditions and illegal activities on the base, including Marines firing shots across the fence line into Cuba. PFC Alvarado, like his on-screen counterpart, "was perceived as not one of the team" and requested a transfer off the base. This information reached commanding officer Colonel Samuel Adams, who elected not to transfer Alvarado despite concerns that the Marine's violation of the chain of command may put him in danger. One night, a group of Marines known as "the Ten" chose to perform a "code red", a term that apparently was used to refer to hazing at the time but is no longer in the Marine vernacular.

"The Ten" restrained a sleeping Alvarado, binding him with tape and stuffing a pillowcase into his mouth as a gag. Alvarado was blindfolded and assaulted while being dragged out of his room. One of "The Ten", David Cox, produced a hair buzzer as the plan was to shave Alvarado bald as punishment. But then Alvarado began choking. His lungs filled with fluid, he spat up blood and began turning purple as he lost consciousness, perhaps because the gag had been soaked in gasoline as an attorney would later allege. The "code red" was immediately stopped, and the Marines called for help. Alvarado was taken to the infirmary before being transferred to a hospital in Miami, Florida, where he—unlike Private William Santiago in A Few Good Men—went on to make a full recovery.

"The Ten" admitted guilt and were arrested immediately. Seven of the Marines took plea deals to avoid a court-martial trial. The remaining three, including Cox, elected to stand trial. The three argued that they committed the code red under an order from a commanding officer and that murder had never been the intention. Each of the three managed to retain their status as Marines after being found guilty of lesser offenses and went on to be honorably discharged at the conclusion of their military careers. The attorney who defended Cox, Donald Marcari, would later say that Adams "never confessed". In an interview, the attorney Marcari said that code reds "were very prevalent" at the time, even though Adams said that "he didn't realize Code Reds were still going on". In court, "we were trying to show there was an implied order," Marcari said, and "that Marines are so gung-ho they must follow any order, even if it's an implied order."

After the release of the film A Few Good Men, five Marines from "The Ten"—Kevin Palermo, Ronald Peterson Jr., Brett Bentley, Dennis Snyder and Christopher Lee Valdez—hired lawyer Gary Patterson and filed a lawsuit in Texas State Court against Castle Rock and other Hollywood companies linked to the film. They argued that Aaron Sorkin took the idea for the story from their real-life incident, and they were seeking $10 million in damages. The lawsuit did not result in a successful outcome or financial compensation for the Marines.

== Production ==
=== Development ===
Aaron Sorkin wrote much of his story on cocktail napkins while bartending at the Palace Theatre on Broadway. He and his roommates had purchased a Macintosh 512K; when he returned home, he would empty his pockets of the napkins and type them into the computer, forming a basis from which he wrote many drafts.

In 1988, Sorkin sold his play's film rights to producer David Brown before it premiered, in a deal reportedly "well into six figures". Brown had read a New York Times article about Sorkin's one-act play Hidden in This Picture, and he learned that Sorkin also had a play called A Few Good Men that was having off-Broadway readings. Brown was producing a few projects at TriStar Pictures, and tried to interest them in adapting A Few Good Men, but his proposal was declined due to the lack of star actors. In 1990, Variety announced that the film would be financed by Groupe Canal+ and Brown's company World Film Services. Brown received a call from Alan Horn at Castle Rock Entertainment, who was eager to make the film. Rob Reiner, a producing partner at Castle Rock Entertainment, opted to direct.

Reiner and Sorkin spent eight months writing the screenplay. William Goldman did an uncredited rewrite; Sorkin liked his changes so much that he incorporated them into the stage version. One of the most significant changes was the removal of a forged logbook that served as the trial's "smoking gun" in the play.

The film had a production budget of between $33 and 40 million. Tom Cruise was cast as Kaffee on March 22, 1991, and was given a $12.5 million salary. Demi Moore was cast as Galloway. Before Moore's casting, Jodie Foster and Linda Hamilton were considered for the role. Wolfgang Bodison was a film location scout when he was asked to take part in a screen test for the part of Dawson. Jason Alexander was initially cast as Weinberg, but had to withdraw after Seinfeld got renewed for a second season, he was replaced by Kevin Pollak. James Woods auditioned to play Jessep, but Jack Nicholson was cast. Nicholson was paid $5 million for 10 days of shooting, earning $500,000 a day. Nicholson said, "it was one of the few times when it was money well spent." He later criticized Columbia Pictures for moving the film's release date to directly compete with his other film that year, Hoffa.

The film starts with a performance of "Semper Fidelis" by a U.S. Marine Corps marching band. A Silent Drill was performed by the Texas A&M University Corps of Cadets Fish Drill Team (portraying the United States Marine Corps Silent Drill Platoon).

Commentators have suggested several former Navy JAG lawyers who might have been the model for Kaffee. These include Don Marcari, now an attorney in Virginia; former U.S. Attorney David Iglesias; Chris Johnson, now practicing in California; and Walter Bansley III, now practicing in Connecticut. But Sorkin has said, "The character of Dan Kaffee in A Few Good Men is entirely fictional and was not inspired by any particular individual."

Cruise said that he modeled his performance on Church of Scientology chairman David Miscavige, with whom he is friends. Cruise insisted on using the church's Clearsound sound reproduction technology, which he claimed captured his voice better.

=== Filming ===
Filming began on October 21, 1991, at the Arlington Memorial Bridge in Washington, D.C. The film's Guantanamo Bay scenes were filmed in Southern California at Crystal Cove State Park, Fort MacArthur, and Naval Air Station Point Mugu. Although 200 off-duty Marines were allowed to serve as extras for the film, the U.S. Department of Defense denied the production permission to film at Marine Corps Base Camp Pendleton. The courtroom scenes were filmed at Culver Studios in Culver City, California.

== Reception ==
=== Box office ===
A Few Good Men premiered at the Odeon Cinema, Manchester, England, and opened on December 11, 1992, in 1,925 theaters. It grossed $15,517,468 in its opening weekend and was the top film at the box office for the next three weeks. Overall, it grossed $141,340,178 in the U.S. and $101,900,000 internationally for a total of $243,240,178.

=== Critical response ===
In one of the final scenes, Jessep responds to Kaffee with the iconic line, "You can't handle the truth!", defining his sense of superiority over Kaffee.

On Rotten Tomatoes, A Few Good Men has an approval rating of 85% based on 133 reviews. The site's critical consensus reads: "An old-fashioned courtroom drama with a contemporary edge, A Few Good Men succeeds on the strength of its stars, with Tom Cruise, Demi Moore, and especially Jack Nicholson delivering powerful performances that more than compensate for the predictable plot." On Metacritic, the film has a score of 62 out of 100, based on 21 critics, indicating "generally favorable" reviews. Audiences polled by CinemaScore gave the film an average grade of "A+" on an A+ to F scale, one of fewer than 60 films in the history of the service to earn that grade.

Vincent Canby of NYT wrote the film lacked "the surprises of Witness for the Prosecution nor does it probe very deeply into the psyche of men who exercise the power of dictators". He disliked when it seemed "to force-feed the audience", yet found it satisfyingly entertaining. Canby praised Bodison's "melancholy shock value" and Nicholson for "giving it a weight, density and point". Peter Travers of Rolling Stone wrote the performances were "uniformly outstanding" and Reiner directed "with masterly assurance, fusing suspense and character." Richard Schickel in Time called it "an extraordinarily well-made movie, which wastes no words or images in telling a conventional but compelling story". Todd McCarthy in Variety magazine predicted: "The same histrionic fireworks that gripped theater audiences will prove even more compelling to filmgoers due to the star power and dramatic screw-tightening." Roger Ebert was less enthusiastic in the Chicago Sun-Times, giving it two-and-a-half out of four stars and finding its major flaw was revealing the courtroom strategy to the audience before the climactic scene between Cruise and Nicholson. Ebert wrote: "In many ways this is a good film, with the potential to be even better than that. The flaws are mostly at the screenplay level; the film doesn't make us work, doesn't allow us to figure out things for ourselves, is afraid we'll miss things if they're not spelled out".

Widescreenings noted that for Kaffee, "Sorkin interestingly takes the opposite approach of Top Gun", in which Cruise also played the protagonist. In Top Gun, Cruise plays Pete "Maverick" Mitchell, a "hotshot military underachiever who makes mistakes because he is trying to outperform his late father. Where Maverick needs to rein in the discipline, Daniel Kaffee needs to let it go, finally see what he can do." Sorkin and Reiner were praised in gradually unveiling Kaffee's potential in the film.

== Awards and honors ==
Award	Category	Nominee(s)	Result
20/20 Awards	Best Supporting Actor	Jack Nicholson	Nominated
Academy Awards	Best Picture	David Brown, Rob Reiner and Andrew Scheinman	Nominated
Academy Awards	Best Supporting Actor	Jack Nicholson	Nominated
Academy Awards	Best Film Editing	Robert Leighton	Nominated
Academy Awards	Best Sound	Kevin O'Connell, Rick Kline and Robert Eber	Nominated
American Cinema Editors Awards	Best Edited Feature Film	Robert Leighton	Nominated
American Society of Cinematographers Awards	Outstanding Achievement in Cinematography in Theatrical Releases	Robert Richardson	Nominated
ASCAP Film and Television Music Awards	Top Box Office Films	Marc Shaiman	Won
Awards Circuit Community Awards	Best Motion Picture	David Brown, Rob Reiner and Andrew Scheinman	Nominated
Awards Circuit Community Awards	Best Director	Rob Reiner	Nominated
Awards Circuit Community Awards	Best Actor in a Supporting Role	Jack Nicholson	Nominated
Awards Circuit Community Awards	Best Adapted Screenplay	Aaron Sorkin	Won
Awards Circuit Community Awards	Best Film Editing	Robert Leighton	Nominated
Awards Circuit Community Awards	Best Original Score	Marc Shaiman	Nominated
Awards Circuit Community Awards	Best Cast Ensemble		Nominated
Chicago Film Critics Association Awards	Best Supporting Actor	Jack Nicholson	Won
Dallas–Fort Worth Film Critics Association Awards	Best Film		Nominated
Directors Guild of America Awards	Outstanding Directorial Achievement in Motion Pictures	Rob Reiner	Nominated
Edgar Allan Poe Awards	Best Motion Picture	Aaron Sorkin	Nominated
Golden Globe Awards	Best Motion Picture – Drama		Nominated
Golden Globe Awards	Best Actor in a Motion Picture – Drama	Tom Cruise	Nominated
Golden Globe Awards	Best Supporting Actor – Motion Picture	Jack Nicholson	Nominated
Golden Globe Awards	Best Director – Motion Picture	Rob Reiner	Nominated
Golden Globe Awards	Best Screenplay – Motion Picture	Aaron Sorkin	Nominated
Heartland Film Festival	Truly Moving Picture	Rob Reiner	Won
MTV Movie Awards	Best Movie		Won
MTV Movie Awards	Best Male Performance	Tom Cruise	Nominated
MTV Movie Awards	Best Male Performance	Jack Nicholson	Nominated
MTV Movie Awards	Best Female Performance	Demi Moore	Nominated
MTV Movie Awards	Most Desirable Male	Tom Cruise	Nominated
MTV Movie Awards	Best Villain	Jack Nicholson	Nominated
NAACP Image Awards	Outstanding Supporting Actor in a Motion Picture	Wolfgang Bodison	Nominated
National Board of Review Awards	Top Ten Films		4th Place
National Board of Review Awards	Best Supporting Actor	Jack Nicholson	Won
New York Film Critics Circle Awards	Best Supporting Actor	Jack Nicholson	Runner-up
People's Choice Awards	Favorite Motion Picture		Won
People's Choice Awards	Favorite Dramatic Motion Picture		Won
Producers Guild of America Awards	Outstanding Producer of Theatrical Motion Pictures	David Brown, Rob Reiner and Andrew Scheinman	Nominated
Southeastern Film Critics Association Awards	Best Picture		7th Place
Southeastern Film Critics Association Awards	Best Supporting Actor	Jack Nicholson	Won

=== Other honors ===
The film is recognized by American Film Institute in these lists:

- 2003: AFI's 100 Years...100 Heroes & Villains:
  - Colonel Nathan R. Jessep – Nominated Villain
- 2005: AFI's 100 Years...100 Movie Quotes:
  - Col. Nathan Jessep: "You can't handle the truth!" – #29
- 2008: AFI's 10 Top 10:
  - #5 Courtroom Drama Film

== Home media ==
A Few Good Men was released on VHS and LaserDisc by Columbia TriStar Home Video on June 30, 1993, and released on DVD on October 7, 1997. The VHS was again released along with a DVD release on May 29, 2001, and later a Blu-ray release followed on September 8, 2007. The Double Feature of the film and Jerry Maguire was released on DVD on December 29, 2009, by Sony Pictures Home Entertainment. A 4K UHD Blu-Ray release occurred on April 24, 2018.

== See also ==
- Trial movies
- JAG (TV series)
- David Cox (Marine)
