= David Cox (Marine) =

Victim in unsolved U.S. murder

- Born: David Vernon Cox; November 27, 1966; Boston, Massachusetts
- Disappeared: January 5, 1994 (aged 27); Natick, Massachusetts
- Body discovered: Medfield, Massachusetts on April 2, 1994
- Education: Massachusetts Bay Community College
- Occupation: U.S. Marine (1985–1989)
- Known for: Participating in a hazing ritual that nearly killed a Marine, which served as the inspiration for A Few Good Men
- Spouse: Elaine Tinsley
- Criminal information
- Status: Released
- Conviction: Simple Assault
- Criminal charges: Attempted Murder, Conspiracy to commit murder
- Penalty: 30 days' incarceration

Details
- Victims: PFC William Alvarado
- Date: A Sunday on September 1986; 1:30 am
- Location: Guantanamo Bay Naval Base
- Military career
- Allegiance: United States
- Branch: United States Marine Corps
- Service years: 1985-1989
- Rank: Corporal (E-4)

David Vernon Cox (November 27, 1966; died 1994) was a U.S. Marine who was found killed in Medfield, Massachusetts. Aaron Sorkin's 1989 play A Few Good Men and its 1992 film adaptation were based partly on events that Cox was a part of while he was in the Marines.

== Early life ==
David Cox was born in Boston, Massachusetts. His family later moved to the suburb of Needham, where he would live until he joined the U.S. Marine Corps. Cox was the youngest of three children, having an older brother, Steven and older sister, Christine. When David was fifteen his parents divorced, and while he initially lived with his mother, June, he later returned to live with his father. He graduated from Needham High School in 1985 and signed up for the Marine Corps with close friend, Jay Steeves, under the buddy program. Both men were sent to the Marine Corps Recruit Depot on Parris Island, South Carolina.

== Marine Corps (1985–1989) ==
Cox went through basic training, or boot camp, on Parris Island and successfully completed the program, becoming a Marine. During his time in the Corps, he served in several different locations around the world including Panama, South Korea and at Guantanamo Bay, in Cuba. He successfully completed Scout Sniper School. At Guantanamo Bay he became involved in a "code red" incident which would play a major role in his military career and later become the inspiration for the film A Few Good Men. Cox left the Marine Corps in 1989 as a corporal with an honorable discharge.

=== The "Code Red" incident ===
Cox's first overseas assignment was at the Naval Base at Guantanamo Bay, Cuba. Here, he was a part of Rifle Security Company, Windward Side, 2nd Platoon along with twenty-nine other Marines, overseen by Squad leader Christopher Lee Valdez. Cox was assigned as a guard along the perimeter, separating the base from the country of Cuba. According to Cox, he belonged to an unofficial group of Marines known as "The Ten", who joined this group by performing exhausting physical challenges, such as running with full gear in 110 degree F (43 degree C) heat and hanging from a sixty-foot (18-meter) tower, by hand, for sixty seconds.

While stationed at Guantanamo Bay, Private First Class (PFC) William Alvarado wrote letters to a Texas Congressman complaining of poor conditions and illegal activities on the base, including Marines firing shots across the fence line into Cuba. PFC Alvarado also requested a transfer off the base. This information reached commanding officer Colonel Samuel Adams, who elected not to transfer Alvarado despite concerns that the Marine's violation of the chain of command might put him in danger. In September 1986, "The Ten" allegedly were encouraged to punish Alvarado for what was viewed as dishonorable conduct. One night, "The Ten" chose to perform a "code red". A "code red" is how they refer to hazing a Marine and is strictly against Marine Corps policy.

At 1:30 a.m. on a Sunday, "The Ten" entered Alvarado's barracks room. They restrained a sleeping Alvarado, binding him with tape and stuffing a pillow case into his mouth as a gag. Alvarado was blindfolded and assaulted while being dragged out of his room. Cox produced a hair buzzer, and the plan was to shave Alvarado bald, as punishment. However, something went wrong and Alvarado began choking. His lungs filled with fluid, he spat up blood and began turning purple, as he lost consciousness. The "code red" was immediately stopped, and the Marines called for help. Alvarado was taken to the infirmary before being transferred to a hospital in Miami, Florida, where he went on to make a full recovery. Following the incident, "The Ten" admitted guilt and were arrested immediately.

=== Court martial ===
All ten Marines were offered a choice: they could accept a plea bargain, which would see them receiving no criminal charges or convictions, though they would be dishonorably discharged from the Marine Corps, or they could proceed on to a court martial in which they would be charged with attempted murder and conspiracy to commit murder. Seven of the ten accepted the plea bargain, including platoon leader Christopher Lee Valdez, who was the only one of the seven to get his discharge upgraded to "honorable". Among these seven, some were represented by Deborah Sorkin, a recent graduate of Boston University Law School, who had signed up for three years on the U.S. Navy Judge Advocate General's Corps. Deborah, sister to writer Aaron Sorkin, informed her brother about the case, which became the basis for the play and later film by the same name, A Few Good Men.

Cox, along with two other Marines, elected to stand trial, arguing that they had committed this act under an order from a commanding officer and that murder had never been the intention. Cox was assigned Donald Marcari as counsel. The court martial, which lasted four days, saw Cox and the other two Marines cleared of both murder and conspiracy charges, though Cox was found guilty of simple assault, for which he was sentenced to thirty days. Since he had been in the brig for thirty-eight days at the time, the simple assault charge was dismissed to time served. Cox went on to finish his service with the Marine Corps, being honorably discharged in September 1989 at the rank of corporal.

== A Few Good Men ==
Upon his exit from the Marine Corps, Cox returned to his home state of Massachusetts and eventually moved in with his girlfriend, Elaine Tinsley in the town of Natick, Massachusetts. For the next few years, Cox worked jobs including hauling trash and tending bar. He would go on to earn a two-year paralegal degree from Massachusetts Bay Community College. Unbeknownst to Cox, Aaron Sorkin had recently opened his play A Few Good Men on Broadway. Following a successful fourteen-month run, the play's rights were purchased and optioned by Castle Rock Entertainment to be made into a major motion picture, released in December 1992, directed by Rob Reiner and starring Tom Cruise, Demi Moore, Jack Nicholson, Kevin Bacon and Kevin Pollak.

The film tells the story of U.S. Marines Lance Corporal Harold Dawson and Private First Class Louden Downey, who are faced with a general court-martial for murdering fellow Marine, PFC William Santiago, during a hazing ritual at the naval base in Guantanamo Bay. The film follows extremely closely to Cox's real-life trial, though details were changed such as having the hazed Marine die, as well as Dawson and Downey ultimately being found innocent of murder, though guilty of conduct unbecoming of a U.S. Marine, for which they are both dishonorably discharged.

Cox felt that the movie distorted the circumstances surrounding his being convicted of simple assault, though he resumed his military career after his court-martial. He was upset that his story had been used, details changed and now someone was making money off of the incident. Cox felt this not only made him look bad, but that it was a violation of his privacy and there was a lot of argument about how exactly the writers had gotten their hands on the official court-martial's transcripts.

Five other Marines who had been involved in the incident (Kevin Palermo, Ronald Peterson Jr., Brett Bentley, Dennis Snyder and Christopher Lee Valdez) hired lawyer Gary Patterson and filed a lawsuit in Texas State Court against Castle Rock and other Hollywood companies linked to the film. They argued that Aaron Sorkin took the idea for the story from their real-life incident, and they were seeking $10 million in damages. The lawsuit did not result in a successful outcome or financial compensation for the Marines.

Cox objected to the use of his court-martial proceedings as the basis for A Few Good Men, regarding the film's portrayal of events as damaging to his reputation and an invasion of his privacy. However, the court-martial had been conducted as a public judicial proceeding. Under U.S. Navy regulations, courts-martial are generally open to the public, and information entered into the record during open proceedings is generally releasable. The distinction between public access to judicial proceedings and the subsequent commercial dramatization of those proceedings was relevant to assessing Cox's objections.

== Killing ==
On January 5, 1994, Elaine Tinsley woke Cox as she was preparing to leave for work. He had been sleeping on the couch, due to a back problem. He was eagerly awaiting a call from United Parcel Service (UPS) with whom he had a temporary position that he was hoping would become permanent. Tinsley left their home at approximately 8:30 a.m. She called home at noon, but received no answer. When checking the messages, she found a call from Cox's boss at UPS offering him a full-time position. Calling back at 1 p.m., she again received no answer. When she returned home around 5:30 p.m., she found Cox's 1988 Ford Truck parked in the driveway, though he was nowhere to be found. The home was in good condition, though Tinsley did report all of the interior doors were open, their pet rabbit was hopping around unrestrained and several glasses appeared to have fallen over.

Tinsley placed several calls to friends and family, but no one had seen, nor heard from Cox. When she approached his truck, she found his keys in the ignition, an un-cashed paycheck on the dashboard and Cox's 9 mm handgun in the glove compartment. The following day, on January 6, when no one had seen Cox and he failed to return home, Tinsley filed a missing person's report with the Natick Police Department. Despite several searches and the Cox family's pleas to the media, there were no leads and no tips about his possible whereabouts.

On April 2, a man canoeing down the Charles River, near Medfield, Massachusetts, noticed a shoe sticking out of some branches. When he approached, he discovered the remains of David Cox in a wooded area more than one-half mile (0.80 km) from the nearest road. The site of Cox's killing was also located between two hunting ranges, which authorities believed indicated that the killer had planned the crime, knowing that gunshots in that area would not elicit alarm from locals. The medical examiner later reported that Cox had been shot execution-style. The first shot went into the back of his neck, followed by three more fired into his left torso. Three 9 mm shell casings were found at the scene. Immediately, police were mystified, as Cox was found wearing his military-issue camouflage field jacket, Marine Corps Scout Sniper hoodie, jeans, and white sneakers. According to family and investigators, he never wore his military garments out. Initially, investigators believed Cox had known his killer and had gone along willingly, though they found it bizarre that he had worn sneakers to walk half a mile into a wooded area when eight inches (20 cm) of snow had fallen the previous day. His killer has never been found.

=== Speculation ===
Investigators believed that Cox had likely known his killer and had gone along willingly, though details about what he was wearing, the keys in the ignition of his truck and the location in which he was found raised questions about that. Cox's brother, Steven, believed his murder may have been linked either to his military past, or perhaps his job with UPS. According to Steven, David had told him months earlier that he believed two employees were stealing packages.

Cox's sister, Christine, does not believe his murder is connected to the military or UPS, though she does believe that his murder suggests a professional, planned out hit. It was later discovered that David had a gambling habit and was in debt at the time of his murder. Investigators, however, believed the debt was too small for murder, being described as only a few thousand dollars, and Cox had enough money in his bank account to pay it off were he in danger.

=== Developments ===
In the more than twenty-five years since Cox was murdered, few developments have been reported. There are no suspects or known motives, and investigators described the case as growing cold almost immediately. In February 2019, two police officers and former Marines, Sergeant John Fanning and Trooper Yuriy Bukhenik of the Massachusetts State Police announced their intention to re-investigate Cox's murder. The two officers believe that new forensic techniques might be able to assist them in discovering new clues that could lead to the killer.

== In media ==
The killing of David Cox was featured in episode 15 of season 8 of Unsolved Mysteries.

== See also ==
- List of solved missing person cases (1990s)
- List of unsolved murders (1980–1999)
