= Ronnie Dyson =

American soul and R&B singer (1950–1990)

- Born: Ronald Dyson; June 5, 1950; Washington, D.C., U.S.
- Died: November 10, 1990 (aged 40) New York City, New York, U.S.
- Genres: Soul, R&B
- Occupations: Singer, actor
- Years active: 1968–1990
- Labels: Columbia, Cotillion

Ronald Dyson (June 5, 1950 – November 10, 1990) was an American soul and R&B singer and actor. He had a lead role in the Broadway production of Hair and scored a top ten single in 1970 with "(If You Let Me Make Love to You Then) Why Can't I Touch You?"

== Early career ==
Born in Washington, D.C., Dyson grew up in Brooklyn, New York, where he sang in church choirs. At 18 years of age, he won a lead role in the Broadway production of Hair, debuting in New York in 1968. Dyson became an iconic voice of the 1960s with the lead vocal in the show's anthem of the hippie era, "Aquarius". It is Dyson's voice leading off the song and opening the show with the famous lyric "When the Moon is in the seventh house, and Jupiter aligns with Mars..." He made a cameo appearance in the 1979 motion picture version of Hair, singing "3-5-0-0" with another Hair alumnus, Melba Moore.

== Later career ==
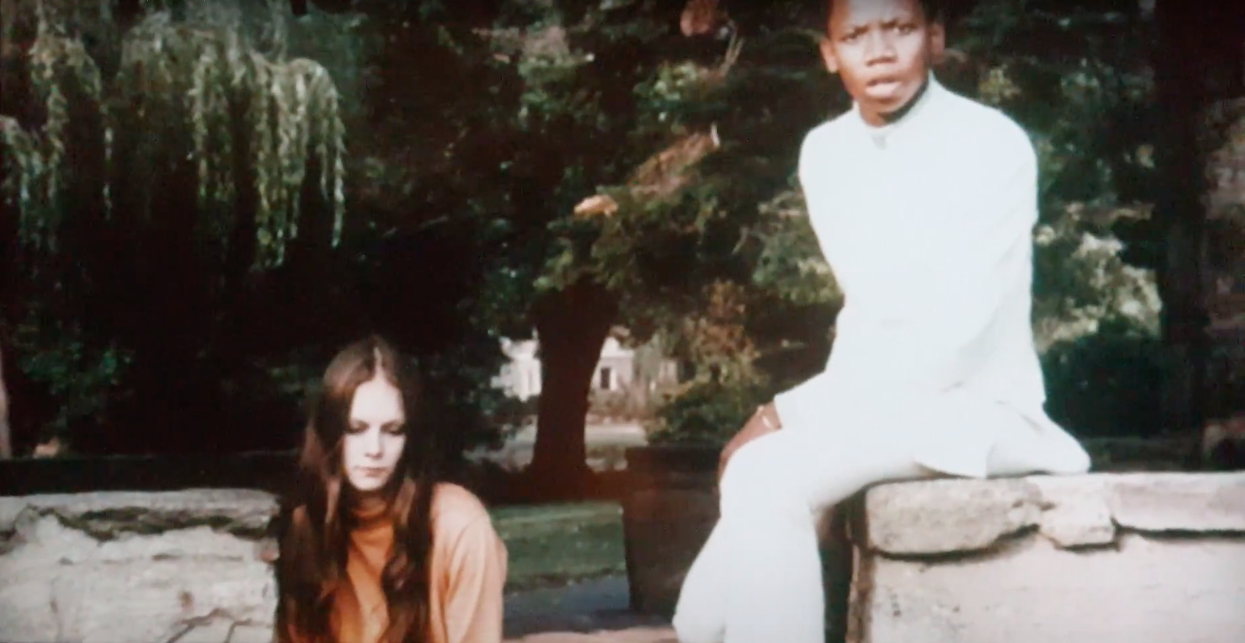
Shelley Plimpton and Dyson in Putney Swope, 1969

Dyson also appeared in the 1969 film Putney Swope.

After Hair, Dyson pursued his stage career with a role in Salvation in 1970. His recording of a song from the Salvation score, "(If You Let Me Make Love to You Then) Why Can't I Touch You?", successfully launched his record career, breaking into the Top 10 of the US Billboard Hot 100, peaking at number eight in 1970. The follow-up, "I Don't Wanna Cry", was a US R&B hit, climbing to number nine.

In 1971, his cover, "When You Get Right Down to It", was a more dramatic version of a song that had been a hit the previous year for the Delfonics; it reached number 34 on the UK Singles Chart in December.

His record company, Columbia Records, sent him to Philadelphia in 1973 to be produced by Thom Bell, one of the premier producers of the day, for several tracks. Bell's highly orchestrated style suited Dyson with hits including "One Man Band (Plays All Alone)", which reached number 28 on the Hot 100 and number 15 on the R&B chart, and "Just Don't Want to Be Lonely", peaking at number 60 on the Hot 100 and number 29 on R&B. They appeared on an album which was also made up of re-mixes of some earlier recordings, including "When You Get Right Down to It".

Dyson remained with Columbia working with top-line producers for another three albums, The More You Do It (1976), Love in All Flavors (1977) and If the Shoe Fits (1979). The title track of the first of the three resulted in one of the singer's biggest-selling records, reaching number six on the R&B chart. It was produced by Charles "Chuck" Jackson (half brother of Jesse Jackson and no relation to the more famous singer of the same name, who recorded for the same company in the 1960s) and Marvin Yancy, who had been responsible for successfully launching the career of Natalie Cole with a series of hits. (Jackson and Yancy had also produced hits for a Chicago soul group, The Independents, with whom Jackson was also lead singer.)

In 1986, Dyson also provided the vocals for the song "Nola" on the She's Gotta Have It soundtrack.

Dyson then moved to an Atlantic Records subsidiary label, the Cotillion Records label, in 1981 for two albums and several singles which were only moderately successful. His acting and singing career had begun to stall in the late 1970s due to ill health, and it was in 1983 that Dyson appeared on the R&B chart for the last time on Cotillion with "All Over Your Face". His final solo recording was "See The Clown" in 1990.

== Death ==
Dyson died at the age of 40 from heart failure on November 10, 1990, in Brooklyn, New York.

== Legacy ==
A posthumous release on Society Hill Records appeared in 1991, when a duet with Vicki Austin, "Are We So Far Apart (We Can't Talk Anymore)", dented the US R&B chart, reaching number 79 during a five-week run.

== Discography ==
=== Studio albums ===
Year	Album	Chart positions		Record label
Year	Album	US	US R&B	Record label
1970	(If You Let Me Make Love to You Then) Why Can't I Touch You?	55	12	Columbia Records
1973	One Man Band	132	34	Columbia Records
1976	The More You Do It	—	30	Columbia Records
1977	Love in All Flavors	—	45	Columbia Records
1979	If the Shoe Fits	—	—	Columbia Records
1982	Phase 2	—	—	Cotillion Records
1983	Brand New Day	—	53	Cotillion Records
"—" denotes the album failed to chart

=== Singles ===
Year	Single	Chart positions				
Year	Single	US Pop	US R&B	US AC	AUS	UK
1970	"(If You Let Me Make Love to You Then) Why Can't I Touch You?"	8	9	—	68	—
1970	"I Don't Wanna Cry"	50	9	—	—	—
1971	"When You Get Right Down to It"	94	37	—	—	34
1973	"One Man Band (Plays All Alone)"	28	15	16	—	—
1973	"Just Don't Want to Be Lonely"	60	29	30	—	—
1974	"We Can Make It Last Forever"	—	62	—	—	—
1976	"The More You Do It (The More I Like It Done to Me)"	62	6	—	—	—
1976	"(I Like Being) Close to You"	—	75	—	—	—
1977	"Don't Be Afraid"	—	30	—	—	—
1978	"Ain't Nothing Wrong"	—	77	—	—	—
1982	"Heart to Heart" / "Bring It On Home"	—	57 / 66	—	—	—
1983	"All Over Your Face"	—	23	—	—	—
1991	"Are We So Far Apart (We Can't Talk Anymore)"	—	79	—	—	—
"—" denotes the single failed to chart

== See also ==
- List of disco artists (L-R)
- List of Soul Train episodes
