= Swadesh Deepak =

Indian writer

Swadesh Deepak (born 1943) is an Indian playwright, novelist and short-story writer. Deepak has been active on the Hindi literary scene since the mid-1960s and is best known for Court Martial, a 1991 play. Deepak's most recent book is Maine Mandu Nahin Dekha, a volume of memoirs.

== Awards and honours ==
Deepak won the Sangeet Natak Akademi Award in 2004.

== Books ==
=== Collections of short stories ===
- Ashwarohi / अश्वारोही (1973)
- Maatam / मातम (1978)
- Tamaasha / तमाशा (1979)
- Pratinidhi Kahaniyan / प्रतिनिधि कहानियां (1985)
- Bal Bhagwaan / बाल भगवान (1986)
- Kisi Apriya Ghatna Ka Samachar Nahin / किसी अप्रिय घटना का समाचार नहीं (1990)
- Maskhare Kabhi Nahin Rote / मसखरे कभी नहीं रोते (1997)
- Nirvachit Kahaniyan / निर्वाचित कहानियां (2003)
- Bagugoshe / बगूगोशे (2017)

=== Novels ===
- Number 57 Squadron / नंबर ५७ स्क्वाड्रन (1973)
- Mayapot / मायापोत (1985)

=== Plays ===
- Natak Bal Bhagwan / नाटक बाल भगवान (1989)
- Court Martial / कोर्ट मार्शल (1991)
- Jalta Hua Rath / जलता हुआ रथ (1998)
- Sabse Udaas Kavita / सबसे उदास कविता (1998)
- Kaal Kothari / काल कोठरी (1999)

=== Memoirs ===
- Maine Mandu Nahin Dekha / मैंने मांडू नहीं देखा (2003)
