= List of Billboard Hot 100 top-ten singles in 1973 =

This is a list of singles that have appeared in the Top 10 of the Billboard Hot 100 during 1973. There were a total of 105 singles that were in the Top 10 (97 of those peaked in 1973, four had peaked in late 1972, and four would peak in early 1974).

Stevie Wonder, Elton John, The Carpenters, Paul McCartney and Wings, Jim Croce, War, and Al Green each had three top-ten hits in 1973, tying them for the most top-ten hits during the year.

== Top-ten singles ==
Key
The yellow background indicates the top 10 singles on Billboard's 1973 Year-End Chart of Pop Singles, with (#) showing rank on that chart. (Note: While "Why Me" by Kris Kristofferson ranked at #6 on Billboard's 1973 Year-End Chart of Pop Singles, it never reached the top 10 on a weekly Hot 100 chart, peaking at #16 for the week ending November 10, 1973.)

Top ten entry date	Single	Artist(s)	Peak	Peak date	Weeks in top ten
Singles from 1972
December 23	"You're So Vain" (#9)	Carly Simon	1	January 6	11
December 23	"Funny Face"	Donna Fargo	5	January 6	4
December 23	"Rockin' Pneumonia and the Boogie Woogie Flu"	Johnny Rivers	6	January 20	6
December 30	"Your Mama Don't Dance"	Loggins and Messina	4	January 27	6
December 30	"Superfly"	Curtis Mayfield	8	January 13	4
Singles from 1973
January 6	"Superstition"	Stevie Wonder	1	January 27	6
January 13	"Crocodile Rock" (#7)	Elton John	1	February 3	9
January 13	"Keeper of the Castle"	Four Tops	10	January 13	1
January 20	"Why Can't We Live Together"	Timmy Thomas	3	February 10	5
January 20	"Oh, Babe, What Would You Say?"	Hurricane Smith	3	February 17	5
January 27	"Trouble Man"	Marvin Gaye	7	February 3	3
January 27	"The World Is a Ghetto"	War	7	February 10	3
February 3	"Do It Again"	Steely Dan	6	February 10	4
February 3	"Hi, Hi, Hi"	Paul McCartney and Wings	10	February 3	1
February 10	"Could It Be I'm Falling in Love"	The Spinners	4	March 3	6
February 10	"Don't Expect Me to Be Your Friend"	Lobo	8	February 17	4
February 17	"Killing Me Softly with His Song" (#3)	Roberta Flack	1	February 24	9
February 17	"Dueling Banjos"	Eric Weissberg and Steve Mandell	2	February 24	6
February 17	"Rocky Mountain High"	John Denver	9	March 3	4
February 24	"Love Train"	The O'Jays	1	March 24	6
February 24	"Last Song"	Edward Bear	3	March 3	6
March 3	"Also Sprach Zarathustra (2001)"	Deodato	2	March 31	6
March 10	"The Cover of Rolling Stone"	Dr. Hook & the Medicine Show	6	March 17	3
March 10	"Daddy's Home"	Jermaine Jackson	9	March 17	2
March 17	"Neither One of Us (Wants to Be the First to Say Goodbye)"	Gladys Knight & the Pips	2	April 7	6
March 17	"Danny's Song"	Anne Murray	7	April 14	6
March 24	"Ain't No Woman (Like the One I've Got)"	Four Tops	4	April 7	6
March 24	"Break Up to Make Up"	The Stylistics	5	April 7	4
March 31	"The Night the Lights Went Out in Georgia"	Vicki Lawrence	1	April 7	7
March 31	"Sing"	The Carpenters	3	April 21	6
April 7	"Tie a Yellow Ribbon Round the Ole Oak Tree" (#1)	Dawn featuring Tony Orlando	1	April 21	11
April 7	"The Cisco Kid"	War	2	April 28	6
April 14	"Call Me (Come Back Home)"	Al Green	10	April 14	1
April 21	"Little Willy"	The Sweet	3	May 5	7
April 21	"Masterpiece"	The Temptations	7	April 28	2
April 21	"The Twelfth of Never"	Donny Osmond	8	April 28	4
April 28	"You Are the Sunshine of My Life"	Stevie Wonder	1	May 19	7
April 28	"Stuck in the Middle with You"	Stealers Wheel	6	May 12	4
May 5	"Frankenstein"	The Edgar Winter Group	1	May 26	7
May 5	"Drift Away"	Dobie Gray	5	May 12	4
May 12	"Daniel"	Elton John	2	June 2	7
May 19	"My Love" (#5)	Paul McCartney and Wings	1	June 2	9
May 19	"Pillow Talk"	Sylvia	3	June 9	7
May 19	"Wildflower"	Skylark	9	May 26	2
May 26	"Hocus Pocus"	Focus	9	June 2	3
June 2	"Playground in My Mind"	Clint Holmes	2	June 16	8
June 2	"I'm Gonna Love You Just a Little More Baby"	Barry White	3	June 23	6
June 9	"Long Train Runnin'"	The Doobie Brothers	8	June 30	3
June 16	"Give Me Love (Give Me Peace on Earth)"	George Harrison	1	June 30	7
June 16	"Will It Go Round in Circles" (#8)	Billy Preston	1	July 7	8
June 16	"Kodachrome"	Paul Simon	2	July 7	7
June 23	"Right Place, Wrong Time"	Dr. John	9	June 30	4
June 30	"Shambala"	Three Dog Night	3	July 28	6
July 7	"Bad, Bad Leroy Brown" (#2)	Jim Croce	1	July 21	8
July 7	"Yesterday Once More"	The Carpenters	2	July 28	6
July 14	"Smoke on the Water"	Deep Purple	4	July 28	5
July 21	"Boogie Woogie Bugle Boy"	Bette Midler	8	July 21	2
July 21	"Natural High"	Bloodstone	10	July 21	1
July 28	"The Morning After"	Maureen McGovern	1	August 4	6
July 28	"Diamond Girl"	Seals and Crofts	6	July 28	2
August 4	"Touch Me in the Morning" (#10)	Diana Ross	1	August 18	8
August 4	"Brother Louie"	Stories	1	August 25	8
August 4	"Live and Let Die"	Paul McCartney and Wings	2	August 11	7
August 11	"Let's Get It On" (#4)	Marvin Gaye	1	September 8	13
August 11	"Uneasy Rider"	Charlie Daniels	9	August 11	3
August 11	"Monster Mash"	Bobby (Boris) Pickett and the Crypt-Kickers	10	August 11	1
August 18	"Delta Dawn"	Helen Reddy	1	September 15	8
August 18	"Get Down"	Gilbert O'Sullivan	7	August 18	3
August 18	"Feelin' Stronger Every Day"	Chicago	10	August 18	2
August 25	"Say, Has Anybody Seen My Sweet Gypsy Rose"	Dawn featuring Tony Orlando	3	September 15	6
September 1	"Loves Me Like a Rock"	Paul Simon	2	October 6	7
September 8	"We're an American Band"	Grand Funk Railroad	1	September 29	6
September 8	"Gypsy Man"	War	8	September 15	2
September 8	"Here I Am (Come and Take Me)"	Al Green	10	September 8	2
September 22	"Half-Breed"	Cher	1	October 6	8
September 22	"Higher Ground"	Stevie Wonder	4	October 13	6
September 22	"That Lady"	The Isley Brothers	6	October 6	6
September 29	"Ramblin' Man"	The Allman Brothers Band	2	October 13	6
September 29	"My Maria"	B. W. Stevenson	9	September 29	1
October 6	"Angie"	The Rolling Stones	1	October 20	7
October 6	"Keep On Truckin'"	Eddie Kendricks	1	November 10	10
October 13	"Midnight Train to Georgia"	Gladys Knight & the Pips	1	October 27	8
October 20	"Heartbeat - It's a Lovebeat"	The DeFranco Family	3	November 17	7
October 20	"Paper Roses"	Marie Osmond	5	November 3	6
November 3	"Space Race"	Billy Preston	4	November 24	6
November 3	"All I Know"	Art Garfunkel	9	November 10	2
November 10	"Photograph"	Ringo Starr	1	November 24	6
November 10	"Top of the World"	The Carpenters	1	December 1	8
November 17	"Just You 'n' Me"	Chicago	4	December 8	6
November 17	"I Got a Name"	Jim Croce	10	November 17	1
November 24	"Goodbye Yellow Brick Road"	Elton John	2	December 8	7
November 24	"The Love I Lost"	Harold Melvin & the Blue Notes	7	December 8	3
December 1	"The Most Beautiful Girl"	Charlie Rich	1	December 15	6
December 8	"Leave Me Alone (Ruby Red Dress)"	Helen Reddy	3	December 29	5
December 8	"Hello It's Me"	Todd Rundgren	5	December 22	4
December 15	"Time in a Bottle"	Jim Croce	1	December 29	7
December 15	"If You're Ready (Come Go with Me)"	The Staple Singers	9	December 22	2

=== 1972 peaks ===
List of Billboard Hot 100 top ten singles in 1973 which peaked in 1972
Top ten entry date	Single	Artist(s)	Peak	Peak date	Weeks in top ten
November 25	"You Ought to Be with Me"	Al Green	3	December 23	7
December 2	"It Never Rains in Southern California"	Albert Hammond	5	December 16	6
December 9	"Me and Mrs. Jones"	Billy Paul	1	December 16	8
December 9	"Clair"	Gilbert O'Sullivan	2	December 30	7

=== 1974 peaks ===
List of Billboard Hot 100 top ten singles in 1973 which peaked in 1974
Top ten entry date	Single	Artist(s)	Peak	Peak date	Weeks in top ten
December 15	"The Joker"	Steve Miller Band	1	January 12	8
December 22	"Never, Never Gonna Give Ya Up"	Barry White	7	January 12	4
December 29	"Show and Tell"	Al Wilson	1	January 19	7
December 29	"Smokin' in the Boys Room"	Brownsville Station	3	January 19	5

== See also ==
- 1973 in music
- List of Billboard Hot 100 number ones of 1973
- Billboard Year-End Hot 100 singles of 1973
