= Billboard Year-End Hot Soul Singles of 1973 =

American music chart

This is a list of the Billboard magazine's Top Hot Soul Singles of 1973.

No.	Title	Artist(s)
1	"Let's Get It On"	Marvin Gaye
2	"Superstition"	Stevie Wonder
3	"Neither One of Us (Wants to Be the First to Say Goodbye)"	Gladys Knight & the Pips
4	"Me and Mrs. Jones"	Billy Paul
5	"Why Can't We Live Together"	Timmy Thomas
6	"One of a Kind (Love Affair)"	The Spinners
7	"Love Train"	The O'Jays
8	"Doing It to Death"	Fred Wesley and The J.B.'s
9	"Midnight Train to Georgia"	Gladys Knight & the Pips
10	"Love Jones"	Brighter Side of Darkness
11	"I'm Gonna Love You Just a Little More Baby"	Barry White
12	"Could It Be I'm Falling in Love"	The Spinners
13	"Masterpiece"	The Temptations
14	"Natural High"	Bloodstone
15	"Pillow Talk"	Sylvia
16	"That Lady"	The Isley Brothers
17	"Give Your Baby a Standing Ovation"	The Dells
18	"Keep On Truckin'"	Eddie Kendricks
19	"If You Want Me to Stay"	Sly and the Family Stone
20	"The World Is a Ghetto"	War
21	"Superfly"	Curtis Mayfield
22	"Here I Am (Come and Take Me)"	Al Green
23	"Stoned Out of My Mind"	The Chi-Lites
24	"Give Me Your Love"	Barbara Mason
25	"Ain't No Woman (Like the One I've Got)"	Four Tops
26	"Leaving Me"	The Independents
27	"Trouble Man"	Marvin Gaye
28	"Angel"	Aretha Franklin
29	"Funky Stuff"	Kool & the Gang
30	"Daddy Could Swear, I Declare"	Gladys Knight & the Pips
31	"Funky Worm"	Ohio Players
32	"It Hurts So Good"	Millie Jackson
33	"Higher Ground"	Stevie Wonder
34	"Will It Go Round in Circles"	Billy Preston
35	"Nobody Wants You When You're Down and Out"	Bobby Womack
36	"Hey Girl (I Like Your Style)"	The Temptations
37	"There's No Me Without You"	The Manhattans
38	"Gypsy Man"	War
39	"Daddy's Home"	Jermaine Jackson
40	"Time to Get Down"	The O'Jays
41	"You Ought to Be with Me"	Al Green
42	"We Did It"	Syl Johnson
43	"I Can't Stand the Rain"	Ann Peebles
44	"Get It Together"	The Jackson 5
45	"Touch Me in the Morning"	Diana Ross
46	"I've Got So Much to Give"	Barry White
47	"Are You Man Enough"	Four Tops
48	"Killing Me Softly with His Song"	Roberta Flack
49	"Theme From Cleopatra Jones"	Joe Simon
50	"Harry Hippie"	Bobby Womack

== See also ==
- 1973 in music
- Billboard Year-End Hot 100 singles of 1973
- List of Hot Soul Singles number ones of 1973
