= Billboard Year-End Hot 100 singles of 1973 =

Ranking of recorded music

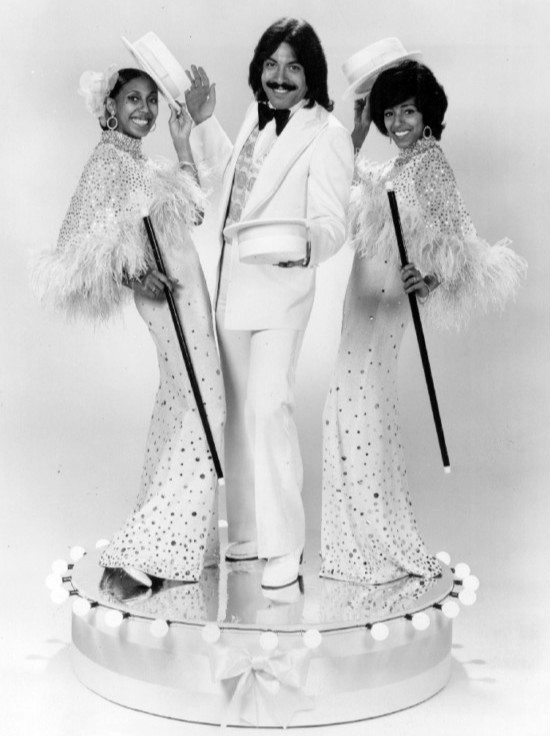
Tony Orlando and Dawn had two songs on the Year-End Hot 100, including "Tie a Yellow Ribbon Round the Ole Oak Tree", the number one song of 1973.

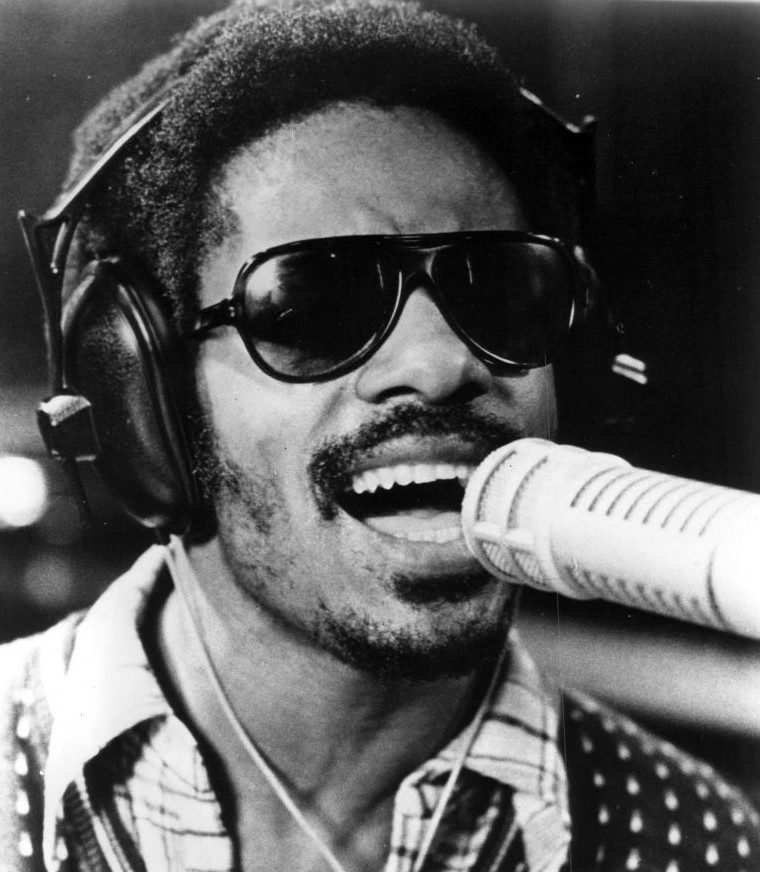
Stevie Wonder had three songs on the Year-End Hot 100.

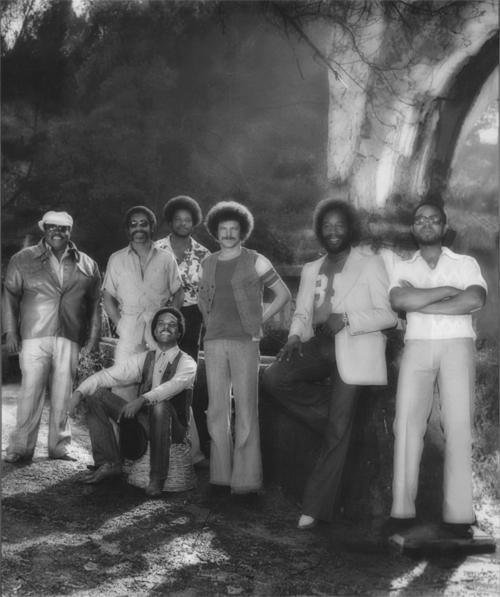
War had three songs on the Year-End Hot 100.

This is a list of Billboard magazine's Top Hot 100 songs of 1973. The Top 100, as revealed in the year-end edition of Billboard dated December 29, 1973, is based on Hot 100 charts from the issue dates of November 25, 1972 through November 17, 1973.

No.	Title	Artist(s)
1	"Tie a Yellow Ribbon Round the Ole Oak Tree"	Tony Orlando and Dawn
2	"Bad, Bad Leroy Brown"	Jim Croce
3	"Killing Me Softly with His Song"	Roberta Flack
4	"Let's Get It On"	Marvin Gaye
5	"My Love"	Paul McCartney & Wings
6	"Why Me"	Kris Kristofferson
7	"Crocodile Rock"	Elton John
8	"Will It Go Round in Circles"	Billy Preston
9	"You're So Vain"	Carly Simon
10	"Touch Me in the Morning"	Diana Ross
11	"The Night the Lights Went Out in Georgia"	Vicki Lawrence
12	"Playground in My Mind"	Clint Holmes
13	"Brother Louie"	Stories
14	"Delta Dawn"	Helen Reddy
15	"Me and Mrs. Jones"	Billy Paul
16	"Frankenstein"	The Edgar Winter Group
17	"Drift Away"	Dobie Gray
18	"Little Willy"	Sweet
19	"You Are the Sunshine of My Life"	Stevie Wonder
20	"Half-Breed"	Cher
21	"That Lady"	The Isley Brothers
22	"Pillow Talk"	Sylvia Robinson
23	"We're an American Band"	Grand Funk Railroad
24	"Right Place Wrong Time"	Dr. John
25	"Wildflower"	Skylark
26	"Superstition"	Stevie Wonder
27	"Loves Me Like a Rock"	Paul Simon
28	"The Morning After"	Maureen McGovern
29	"Rocky Mountain High"	John Denver
30	"Stuck in the Middle with You"	Stealers Wheel
31	"Shambala"	Three Dog Night
32	"Love Train"	The O'Jays
33	"I'm Gonna Love You Just a Little More Baby"	Barry White
34	"Say, Has Anybody Seen My Sweet Gypsy Rose"	Tony Orlando and Dawn
35	"Keep on Truckin'"	Eddie Kendricks
36	"Danny's Song"	Anne Murray
37	"Dancing in the Moonlight"	King Harvest
38	"Monster Mash"	Bobby 'Boris' Pickett
39	"Natural High"	Bloodstone
40	"Diamond Girl"	Seals and Crofts
41	"Long Train Runnin'"	The Doobie Brothers
42	"Give Me Love (Give Me Peace on Earth)"	George Harrison
43	"If You Want Me to Stay"	Sly & the Family Stone
44	"Daddy's Home"	Jermaine Jackson
45	"Neither One of Us (Wants to Be the First to Say Goodbye)"	Gladys Knight & the Pips
46	"I'm Doin' Fine Now"	New York City
47	"Could It Be I'm Falling in Love"	The Spinners
48	"Daniel"	Elton John
49	"Midnight Train to Georgia"	Gladys Knight & the Pips
50	"Smoke on the Water"	Deep Purple
51	"The Cover of "Rolling Stone""	Dr. Hook & The Medicine Show
52	"Behind Closed Doors"	Charlie Rich
53	"Your Mama Don't Dance"	Loggins and Messina
54	"Feelin' Stronger Every Day"	Chicago
55	"The Cisco Kid"	War
56	"Live and Let Die"	Paul McCartney & Wings
57	"Oh, Babe, What Would You Say?"	Hurricane Smith
58	"I Believe in You (You Believe in Me)"	Johnnie Taylor
59	"Sing"	The Carpenters
60	"Ain't No Woman (Like the One I've Got)"	The Four Tops
61	"Dueling Banjos"	Eric Weissberg & Steve Mandell
62	"Higher Ground"	Stevie Wonder
63	"Here I Am (Come and Take Me)"	Al Green
64	"My Maria"	B.W. Stevenson
65	"Superfly"	Curtis Mayfield
66	"Last Song"	Edward Bear
67	"Get Down"	Gilbert O'Sullivan
68	"Reelin' in the Years"	Steely Dan
69	"Hocus Pocus"	Focus
70	"Yesterday Once More"	The Carpenters
71	"Boogie Woogie Bugle Boy"	Bette Midler
72	"Clair"	Gilbert O'Sullivan
73	"Do It Again"	Steely Dan
74	"Kodachrome"	Paul Simon
75	"Why Can't We Live Together"	Timmy Thomas
76	"Do You Want To Dance?"	Bette Midler
77	"So Very Hard to Go"	Tower of Power
78	"Rockin' Pneumonia and the Boogie Woogie Flu"	Johnny Rivers
79	"Ramblin' Man"	The Allman Brothers Band
80	"Masterpiece"	The Temptations
81	"Peaceful"	Helen Reddy
82	"One of a Kind (Love Affair)"	The Spinners
83	"Funny Face"	Donna Fargo
84	"Funky Worm"	Ohio Players
85	"Angie"	The Rolling Stones
86	"Jambalaya (On the Bayou)"	Blue Ridge Rangers
87	"Don't Expect Me to Be Your Friend"	Lobo
88	"Break Up to Make Up"	The Stylistics
89	"Daisy a Day"	Jud Strunk
90	"Also Sprach Zarathustra (2001)"	Deodato
91	"Stir It Up"	Johnny Nash
92	"Money"	Pink Floyd
93	"Gypsy Man"	War
94	"The World Is a Ghetto"	War
95	"Yes We Can Can"	The Pointer Sisters
96	"Free Ride"	The Edgar Winter Group
97	"Space Oddity"	David Bowie
98	"It Never Rains in Southern California"	Albert Hammond
99	"The Twelfth of Never"	Donny Osmond
100	"Papa Was a Rollin' Stone"	The Temptations

== See also ==
- 1973 in music
- Billboard Year-End Hot Soul Singles of 1973
- List of Billboard Hot 100 number-one singles of 1973
- List of Billboard Hot 100 top-ten singles in 1973
