= List of Hot Soul Singles number ones of 1973 =

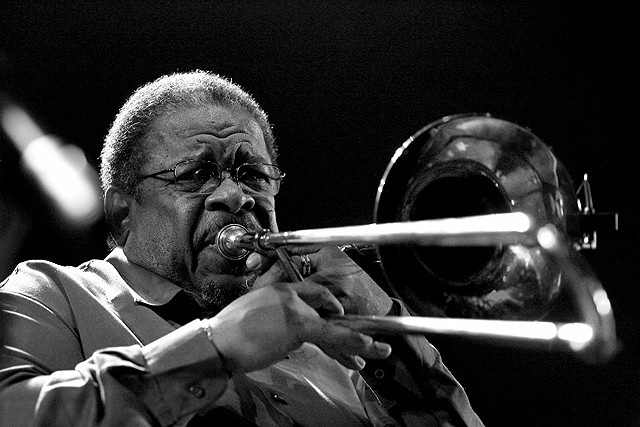
Fred Wesley received the featured credit on "Doing It to Death" by James Brown's regular backing band, the J.B.'s.

Billboard published a weekly chart in 1973 ranking the top-performing singles in the United States in soul music and related African American-oriented music genres; the chart has undergone various name changes over the decades to reflect the evolution of such genres and since 2005 has been published as Hot R&B/Hip-Hop Songs. In 1973, it was published under the title Best Selling Soul Singles through the issue of Billboard dated July 7 and Hot Soul Singles thereafter, and 22 different singles topped the chart.

Stevie Wonder had both the first and last number ones of 1973. In the issue of Billboard dated January 6, Wonder's song "Superstition" reached number one, displacing the final chart-topper of 1972, "Me and Mrs. Jones" by Billy Paul. Wonder returned to number one for a single week in September 1973 with "Higher Ground" and gained his third chart-topper of the year when "Living for the City" reached the top spot in the issue dated December 29, making him the only act to achieve three number ones in 1973. Gladys Knight & the Pips and the Spinners each had two chart-topping singles during the year. With a cumulative total of eight weeks, Knight and her group had the highest total number of weeks atop the chart of any act. The year's longest unbroken run at number one was achieved by Marvin Gaye, who spent six consecutive weeks atop the chart with "Let's Get It On".

Several acts gained the first number ones of their careers in 1973, beginning with Timmy Thomas, who displaced Stevie Wonder from the top spot in late January with "Why Can't We Live Together". In May and June, three consecutive chart-toppers were debut number ones for their respective artists, the Ohio Players, the Independents and Barry White. The J.B.'s, the backing band for singer James Brown, reached number one in their own right for the first time in July with "Doing It to Death". The group's trombonist and musical director Fred Wesley received a featured credit on the single; James Brown himself appeared on the track but was not credited. Three months later, Eddie Kendricks gained his first number one as a solo artist with "Keep on Truckin'"; Kendricks had left the Temptations in 1971 after achieving several number ones as a member of the group. In addition to the various acts topping the chart for the first time, Sylvia made her first appearance at number one since Billboard launched a combined sales and airplay chart for black music; her last chart-topper had been on the Most Played R&B by Jockeys listing as half of the duo Mickey & Sylvia in 1957.

== Chart history ==
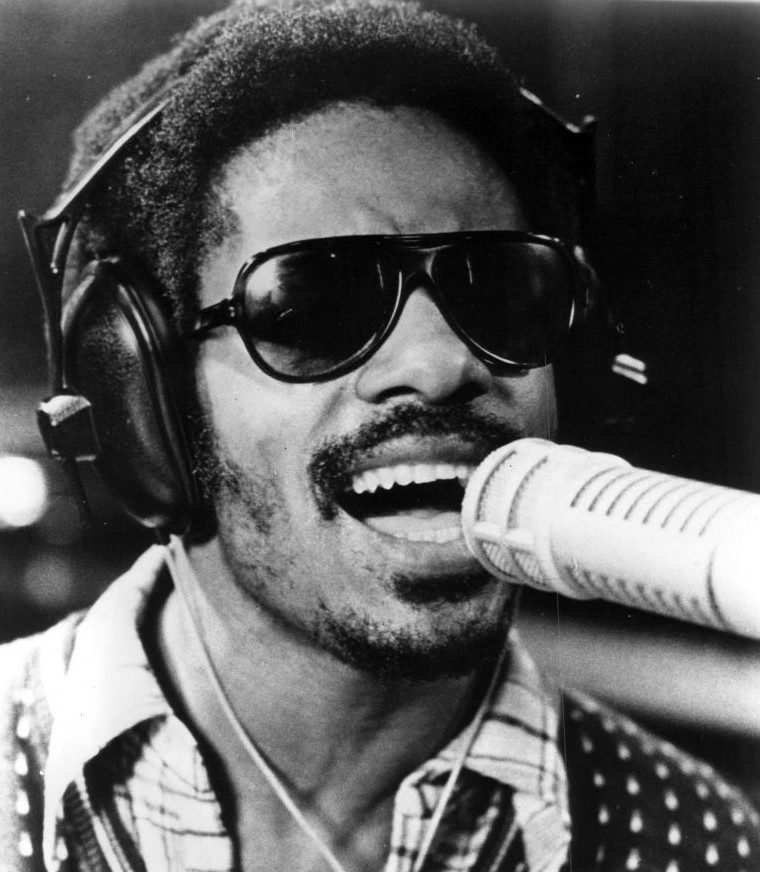
Stevie Wonder had three number ones in 1973.

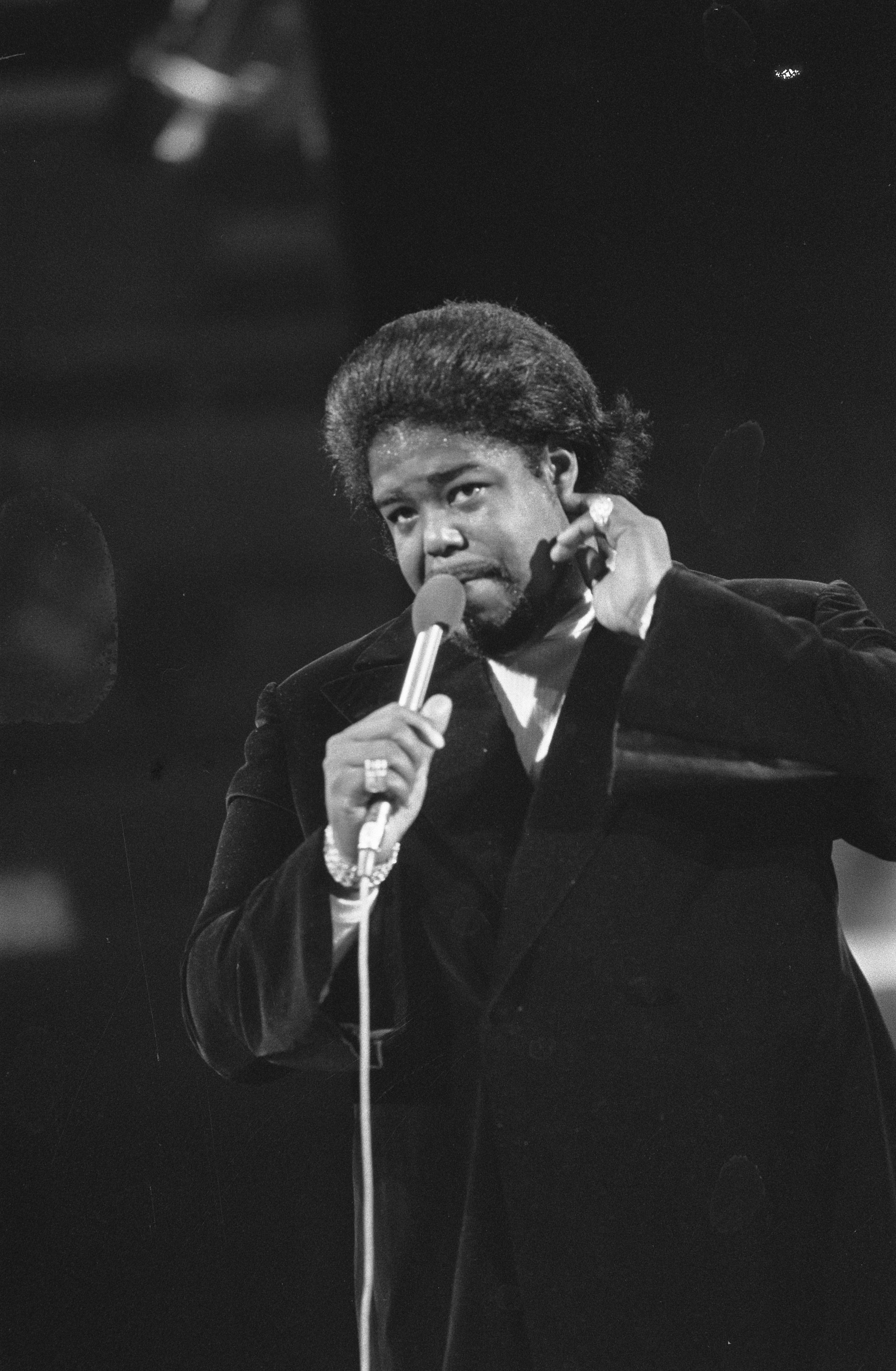
Barry White topped the chart with "I'm Gonna Love You Just a Little More Baby".

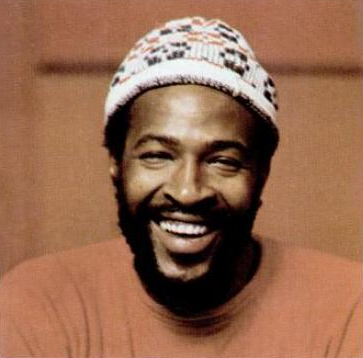
Marvin Gaye had the year's longest-running number one with "Let's Get It On".

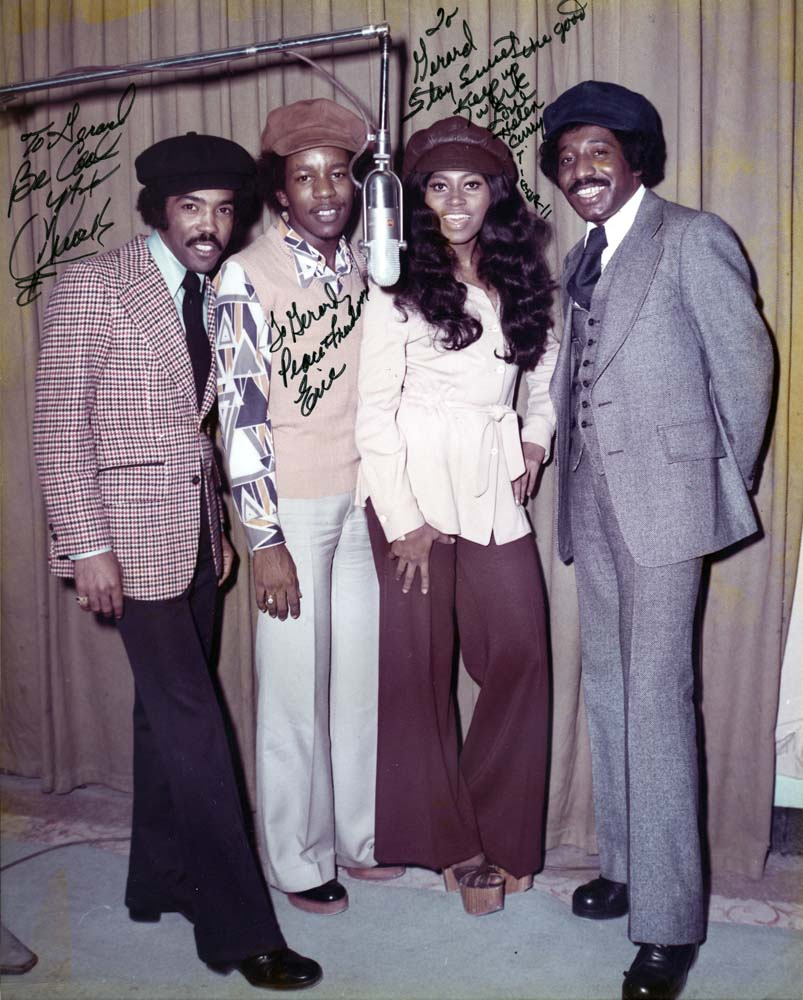
"Leaving Me" was a number one for the Independents.

Key
†	Indicates number 1 on Billboard's year-end soul chart

Chart history
Issue date	Title	Artist(s)	Ref.
January 6	"Superstition"	Stevie Wonder	
January 13	"Superstition"	Stevie Wonder	
January 20	"Superstition"	Stevie Wonder	
January 27	"Why Can't We Live Together"	Timmy Thomas	
February 3	"Why Can't We Live Together"	Timmy Thomas	
February 10	"Could It Be I'm Falling in Love"	The Spinners	
February 17	"Love Train"	The O'Jays	
February 24	"Love Train"	The O'Jays	
March 3	"Love Train"	The O'Jays	
March 10	"Love Train"	The O'Jays	
March 17	"Neither One of Us (Wants to Be the First to Say Goodbye)"	Gladys Knight & the Pips	
March 24	"Neither One of Us (Wants to Be the First to Say Goodbye)"	Gladys Knight & the Pips	
March 31	"Neither One of Us (Wants to Be the First to Say Goodbye)"	Gladys Knight & the Pips	
April 7	"Neither One of Us (Wants to Be the First to Say Goodbye)"	Gladys Knight & the Pips	
April 14	"Masterpiece"	The Temptations	
April 21	"Masterpiece"	The Temptations	
April 28	"Pillow Talk"	Sylvia	
May 5	"Pillow Talk"	Sylvia	
May 12	"Funky Worm"	Ohio Players	
May 19	"Leaving Me"	The Independents	
May 26	"I'm Gonna Love You Just a Little More Baby"	Barry White	
June 2	"I'm Gonna Love You Just a Little More Baby"	Barry White	
June 9	"One of a Kind (Love Affair)"	The Spinners	
June 16	"One of a Kind (Love Affair)"	The Spinners	
June 23	"One of a Kind (Love Affair)"	The Spinners	
June 30	"One of a Kind (Love Affair)"	The Spinners	
July 7	"Doing It to Death"	Fred Wesley & the J.B.'s	
July 14	"Doing It to Death"	Fred Wesley & the J.B.'s	
July 21	"I Believe in You (You Believe in Me)"	Johnnie Taylor	
July 28	"I Believe in You (You Believe in Me)"	Johnnie Taylor	
August 4	"Angel"	Aretha Franklin	
August 11	"Angel"	Aretha Franklin	
August 18	"Let's Get It On" †	Marvin Gaye	
August 25	"Let's Get It On" †	Marvin Gaye	
September 1	"Let's Get It On" †	Marvin Gaye	
September 8	"Let's Get It On" †	Marvin Gaye	
September 15	"Let's Get It On" †	Marvin Gaye	
September 22	"Let's Get It On" †	Marvin Gaye	
September 29	"Higher Ground"	Stevie Wonder	
October 6	"Keep on Truckin'"	Eddie Kendricks	
October 13	"Keep on Truckin'"	Eddie Kendricks	
October 20	"Midnight Train to Georgia"	Gladys Knight & the Pips	
October 27	"Midnight Train to Georgia"	Gladys Knight & the Pips	
November 3	"Midnight Train to Georgia"	Gladys Knight & the Pips	
November 10	"Midnight Train to Georgia"	Gladys Knight & the Pips	
November 17	"Space Race"	Billy Preston	
November 24	"The Love I Lost (Part 1)"	Harold Melvin & the Blue Notes	
December 1	"The Love I Lost (Part 1)"	Harold Melvin & the Blue Notes	
December 8	"If You're Ready (Come Go With Me)"	The Staple Singers	
December 15	"If You're Ready (Come Go With Me)"	The Staple Singers	
December 22	"If You're Ready (Come Go With Me)"	The Staple Singers	
December 29	"Living for the City"	Stevie Wonder	

== See also ==
- 1973 in music
- Billboard Year-End Hot Soul Singles of 1973
- List of Billboard Hot 100 number-one singles of 1973
