= Meskell =

Meskell is a surname. Notable people with the surname include:

- Danielle Meskell (born 1973), Australian rugby union player
- Lynn Meskell (born 1967), Australian anthropologist
- Walter Meskell (1948–2024), American musician

== See also ==
- Meskel, holiday/festivity of the Orthodox Tewahedo churches of Ethiopia and Eritrea
