= List of Cash Box Top 100 number-one singles of 1973 =

These are the Top 100 singles of 1973 from Cash Box magazine.

| Issue date | Song | Artist |
|---|---|---|
| January 6 | "You're So Vain" | Carly Simon |
| January 13 | "You're So Vain" | Carly Simon |
| January 20 | "Superstition" | Stevie Wonder |
| January 27 | "Superstition" | Stevie Wonder |
| February 3 | "Crocodile Rock" | Elton John |
| February 10 | "Crocodile Rock" | Elton John |
| February 17 | "Oh, Babe, What Would You Say?" | Hurricane Smith |
| February 24 | "Could It Be I'm Falling in Love" | The Spinners |
| March 3 | "Dueling Banjos" | Eric Weissberg and Steve Mandell |
| March 10 | "Killing Me Softly with His Song" | Roberta Flack |
| March 17 | "Killing Me Softly with His Song" | Roberta Flack |
| March 24 | "Killing Me Softly with His Song" | Roberta Flack |
| March 31 | "Love Train" | The O'Jays |
| April 7 | "Neither One of Us (Wants to Be the First to Say Goodbye)" | Gladys Knight & the Pips |
| April 14 | "Ain't No Woman (Like the One I've Got)" | Four Tops |
| April 21 | "The Night the Lights Went Out in Georgia" | Vicki Lawrence |
| April 28 | "Tie a Yellow Ribbon Round the Ole Oak Tree" | Dawn featuring Tony Orlando |
| May 5 | "Tie a Yellow Ribbon Round the Ole Oak Tree" | Dawn featuring Tony Orlando |
| May 12 | "Tie a Yellow Ribbon Round the Ole Oak Tree" | Dawn featuring Tony Orlando |
| May 19 | "You Are the Sunshine of My Life" | Stevie Wonder |
| May 26 | "Frankenstein" | The Edgar Winter Group |
| June 2 | "My Love" | Paul McCartney and Wings |
| June 9 | "My Love" | Paul McCartney and Wings |
| June 16 | "My Love" | Paul McCartney and Wings |
| June 23 | "My Love" | Paul McCartney and Wings |
| June 30 | "Give Me Love (Give Me Peace on Earth)" | George Harrison |
| July 7 | "Give Me Love (Give Me Peace on Earth)" | George Harrison |
| July 14 | "Will It Go Round in Circles" | Billy Preston |
| July 21 | "Shambala" | Three Dog Night |
| July 28 | "Bad, Bad Leroy Brown" | Jim Croce |
| August 4 | "Yesterday Once More" | The Carpenters |
| August 11 | "Touch Me in the Morning" | Diana Ross |
| August 18 | "Live And Let Die" | Paul McCartney and Wings |
| August 25 | "Brother Louie" | Stories |
| September 1 | "Let's Get It On" | Marvin Gaye |
| September 8 | "Delta Dawn" | Helen Reddy |
| September 15 | "Delta Dawn" | Helen Reddy |
| September 22 | "We're an American Band" | Grand Funk |
| September 29 | "Loves Me Like a Rock" | Paul Simon |
| October 6 | "Half-Breed" | Cher |
| October 13 | "Higher Ground" | Stevie Wonder |
| October 20 | "Ramblin Man" | Allman Brothers Band |
| October 27 | "Angie" | The Rolling Stones |
| November 3 | "Keep on Truckin' (Part 1)" | Eddie Kendricks |
| November 10 | "Midnight Train to Georgia" | Gladys Knight & the Pips |
| November 17 | "Heartbeat, It's a Lovebeat" | The DeFranco Family |
| November 24 | "Photograph" | Ringo Starr |
| December 1 | "Top of the World" | The Carpenters |
| December 8 | "Goodbye Yellow Brick Road" | Elton John |
| December 15 | "Just You 'N' Me" | Chicago |
| December 22 | "The Most Beautiful Girl" | Charlie Rich |
| December 29 | "The Most Beautiful Girl" | Charlie Rich |

== See also ==
- 1973 in music
- List of Billboard Hot 100 number ones of 1973
- List of number-one singles of 1973 (Canada)
