= Merlina =

Merlina may refer to:

- Merlina (Sonic the Hedgehog)
- Merlina DeFranco, part of the DeFranco Family
