= List of Canadian number-one albums of 1973 =

This article lists the Canadian number-one albums of 1973. The chart was compiled and published by RPM every Saturday.

Two acts held the top position simultaneously in both the albums and singles charts: Carly Simon on January 27 and the Rolling Stones on October 20–27.

(Entries with dates marked thus* are not presently on record at Library and Archives Canada and were inferred from the following week's listing.)

Issue date	Album	Artist
January 6*	Living in the Past	Jethro Tull
January 13	Seventh Sojourn	The Moody Blues
January 20	Seventh Sojourn	The Moody Blues
January 27	No Secrets	Carly Simon
February 3	No Secrets	Carly Simon
February 10	No Secrets	Carly Simon
February 17	No Secrets	Carly Simon
February 24	No Secrets	Carly Simon
March 3	No Secrets	Carly Simon
March 10	No Secrets	Carly Simon
March 17	Don't Shoot Me I'm Only the Piano Player	Elton John
March 24	Don't Shoot Me I'm Only the Piano Player	Elton John
March 31	Don't Shoot Me I'm Only the Piano Player	Elton John
April 7	Dueling Banjos	Various Artists
April 14	Dueling Banjos	Various Artists
April 21	Rocky Mountain High	John Denver
April 28	Rocky Mountain High	John Denver
May 5	Aloha from Hawaii: Via Satellite	Elvis Presley
May 12	The Dark Side of the Moon	Pink Floyd
May 19	Houses of the Holy	Led Zeppelin
May 26	Houses of the Holy	Led Zeppelin
June 2	Houses of the Holy	Led Zeppelin
June 9	Houses of the Holy	Led Zeppelin
June 16	The Dark Side of the Moon	Pink Floyd
June 23	Living in the Material World	George Harrison
June 30	Living in the Material World	George Harrison
July 7	Living in the Material World	George Harrison
July 14	Living in the Material World	George Harrison
July 21	Living in the Material World	George Harrison
July 28	Living in the Material World	George Harrison
August 4	The Dark Side of the Moon	Pink Floyd
August 11	The Dark Side of the Moon	Pink Floyd
August 18	Machine Head	Deep Purple
August 23	A Passion Play	Jethro Tull
August 30	A Passion Play	Jethro Tull
September 8	The Dark Side of the Moon	Pink Floyd
September 15	The Dark Side of the Moon	Pink Floyd
September 22	Machine Head	Deep Purple
September 29	Machine Head	Deep Purple
October 6	Brothers and Sisters	The Allman Brothers Band
October 13*	Brothers and Sisters	The Allman Brothers Band
October 20	Goat's Head Soup	The Rolling Stones
October 27	Goat's Head Soup	The Rolling Stones
November 3	Goodbye Yellow Brick Road	Elton John
November 10	Goodbye Yellow Brick Road	Elton John
November 17	Goodbye Yellow Brick Road	Elton John
November 24	Goodbye Yellow Brick Road	Elton John
December 1	Goodbye Yellow Brick Road	Elton John
December 8	You Don't Mess Around with Jim	Jim Croce
December 15	You Don't Mess Around with Jim	Jim Croce
December 22*	Ringo	Ringo Starr
December 29	Life and Times	Jim Croce

== See also ==
- 1973 in music
- List of number-one singles of 1973 (Canada)
