= List of number-one singles of 1973 (Canada) =

This is a list of the weekly Canadian RPM magazine (Note: The magazine's weekly record charts were digitized by the AV Trust. The collection is archived by Library and Archives Canada here . The PDF text search does not work unless you have additional software installed. You must view each entry on the chart for a match.) number one Top Singles chart of 1973. (Note: A collection of all the .pdf files cited is available here .) (Note: On 21 March 1966, the chart became the RPM 100, as expanded to the top 100 singles.)

Volume:Issue	Issue Date(s)	Song	Artist
18:21&22	13 January	"Clair"	Gilbert O'Sullivan
18:23	20 January	"Clair"	Gilbert O'Sullivan
18:24	27 January	"You're So Vain"	Carly Simon
18:25	3 February	"Last Song"	Edward Bear
18:26	10 February	"Last Song"	Edward Bear
19:1	17 February	"Crocodile Rock"	Elton John
19:2	24 February	"Crocodile Rock"	Elton John
19:3	3 March	"Crocodile Rock"	Elton John
19:4	10 March	"Crocodile Rock"	Elton John
19:5	17 March	"Danny's Song"	Anne Murray
19:6	24 March	"Danny's Song"	Anne Murray
19:7	31 March	"Killing Me Softly with His Song"	Roberta Flack
19:8	7 April	"Killing Me Softly with His Song"	Roberta Flack
19:9	14 April	"Killing Me Softly with His Song"	Roberta Flack
19:10	21 April	"Tie a Yellow Ribbon Round the Ole Oak Tree"	Dawn featuring Tony Orlando
19:11	28 April	"Tie a Yellow Ribbon Round the Ole Oak Tree"	Dawn featuring Tony Orlando
19:12	5 May	"The Night the Lights Went Out in Georgia"	Vicki Lawrence
19:13	12 May	"The First Cut Is the Deepest"	Keith Hampshire
19:14	19 May	"The Cisco Kid"	War
19:15	26 May	"Little Willy"	The Sweet
19:16	2 June	"Daniel"	Elton John
19:17	9 June	"Daniel"	Elton John
19:18	16 June	"Frankenstein"	Edgar Winter
19:19	23 June	"Playground in My Mind"	Clint Holmes
19:20	30 June	"Playground in My Mind"	Clint Holmes
19:21	7 July	"Playground in My Mind"	Clint Holmes
19:22	14 July	"Will It Go Round in Circles"	Billy Preston
19:23	21 July	"Yesterday Once More"	Carpenters
19:24	28 July	"Bad, Bad Leroy Brown"	Jim Croce
19:25	4 August	"Monster Mash"	Bobby "Boris" Pickett
19:26	11 August	"Monster Mash"	Bobby "Boris" Pickett
20:1	18 August	"Monster Mash"	Bobby "Boris" Pickett
20:2	25 August	"Brother Louie"	Stories
20:3	1 September	"Brother Louie"	Stories
20:4	8 September	"Brother Louie"	Stories
20:5	15 September	"Delta Dawn"	Helen Reddy
20:6	22 September	"Delta Dawn"	Helen Reddy
20:7	29 September	"Delta Dawn"	Helen Reddy
20:8	6 October	"Half Breed"	Cher
20:9	13 October	"Angie"	The Rolling Stones
20:10	20 October	"Angie"	The Rolling Stones
20:11	27 October	"Angie"	The Rolling Stones
20:12	3 November	"Angie"	The Rolling Stones
20:13	10 November	"Angie"	The Rolling Stones
20:14	17 November	"Could You Ever Love Me Again"	Gary and Dave
20:15	24 November	"Photograph"	Ringo Starr
20:16	1 December	"Photograph"	Ringo Starr
20:17	8 December	"Top of the World"	Carpenters
20:18	15 December	"Top of the World"	Carpenters
20:19	22 December	"Goodbye Yellow Brick Road"	Elton John
20:20	29 December	"The Most Beautiful Girl in the World"	Charlie Rich

== See also ==
- 1973 in music
- List of Billboard Hot 100 number ones of 1973
- List of Cashbox Top 100 number-one singles of 1973
