= Hotline Bling =

2015 single by Drake

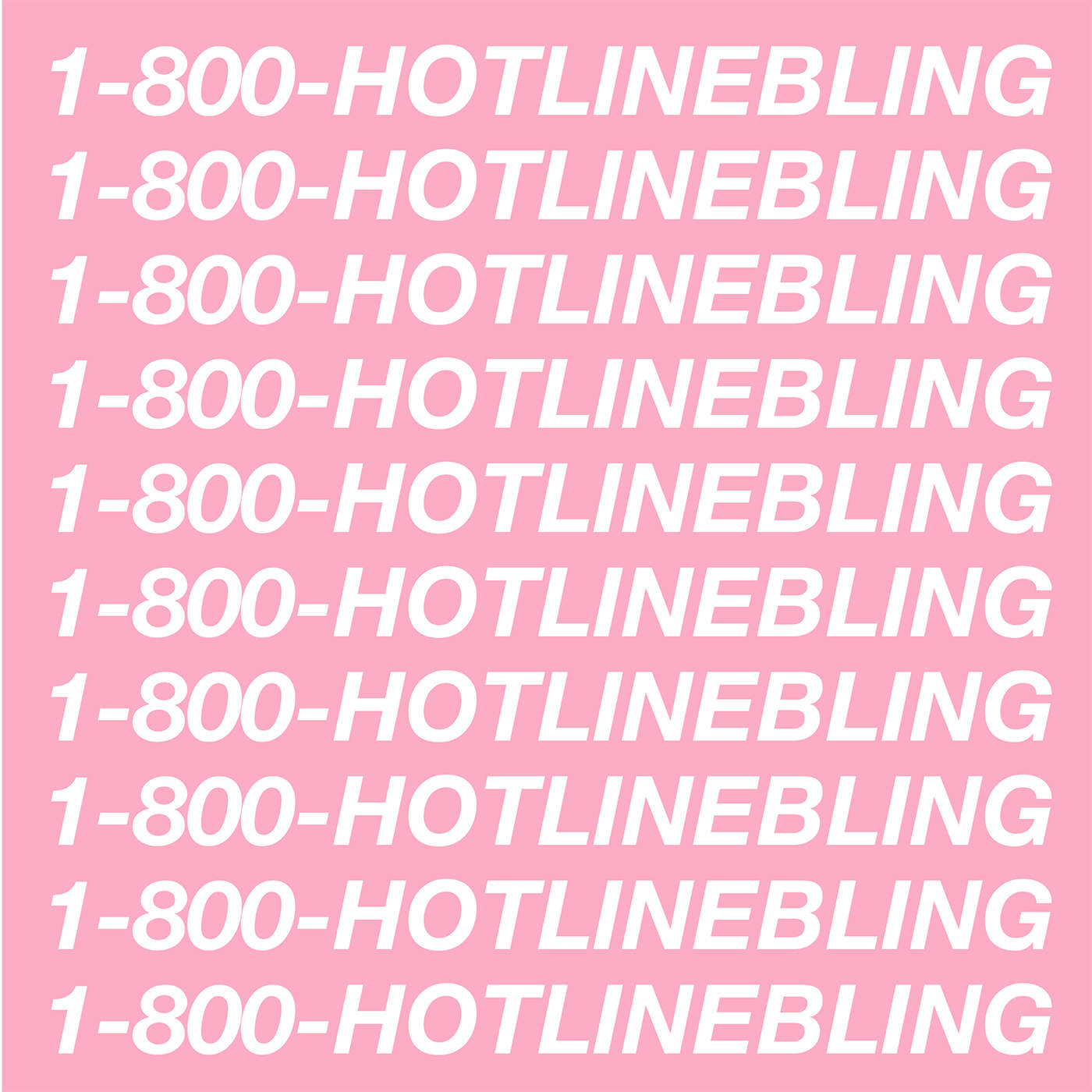

Single by Drake

from the album Views
- Released: July 31, 2015
- Genre: Pop rap; R&B
- Length: 4:27; 3:49 (Radio Edit/Views CD Version)
- Label: Cash Money; Young Money; Republic
- Songwriters: Aubrey Graham; Paul Jefferies; Timmy Thomas
- Producer: Nineteen85

Drake singles chronology
"Back To Back" (2015)	"Hotline Bling" (2015)	"Right Hand" (2015)

Music video
- "Hotline Bling" on YouTube

"Hotline Bling" is a song recorded by Canadian rapper Drake, which served as the lead single from his fourth studio album Views (2016). The song is credited as a bonus track on the album. It was made available for digital download on July 31, 2015, through Cash Money, Young Money, and Republic.

Music critics were complimentary about the presentation of Drake's emotional side, as well as its production. A music video directed by Director X was released two months later; it subsequently gained popularity on YouTube and spawned several parodies. The song was included on several year-end critics' polls.

"Hotline Bling" reached number 2 on the US Billboard Hot 100. It also reached number 3 in Drake's native Canada and the United Kingdom. The song won the award for Favorite Rap/Hip-Hop Song at the 2016 American Music Awards. It also received two wins at the 2017 Grammy Awards for Best Rap Song and Best Rap/Sung Performance.

== Composition ==
"Hotline Bling" is a pop and R&B song written by Drake and Nineteen85, the latter of whom also produced the song. The song was composed in F major with a tempo of 135 beats per minute in common time with a chord progression of Bbmaj7 – Am7. The song was directly inspired by DRAM's "Cha Cha" and was originally seen to be a remix, with the song premiering on Beats 1 OVO Sound Radio as "Hotline Bling (Cha Cha Remix)". "Hotline Bling"'s instrumental is based on a sample of R&B singer Timmy Thomas's 1972 song "Why Can't We Live Together".

== Music video ==
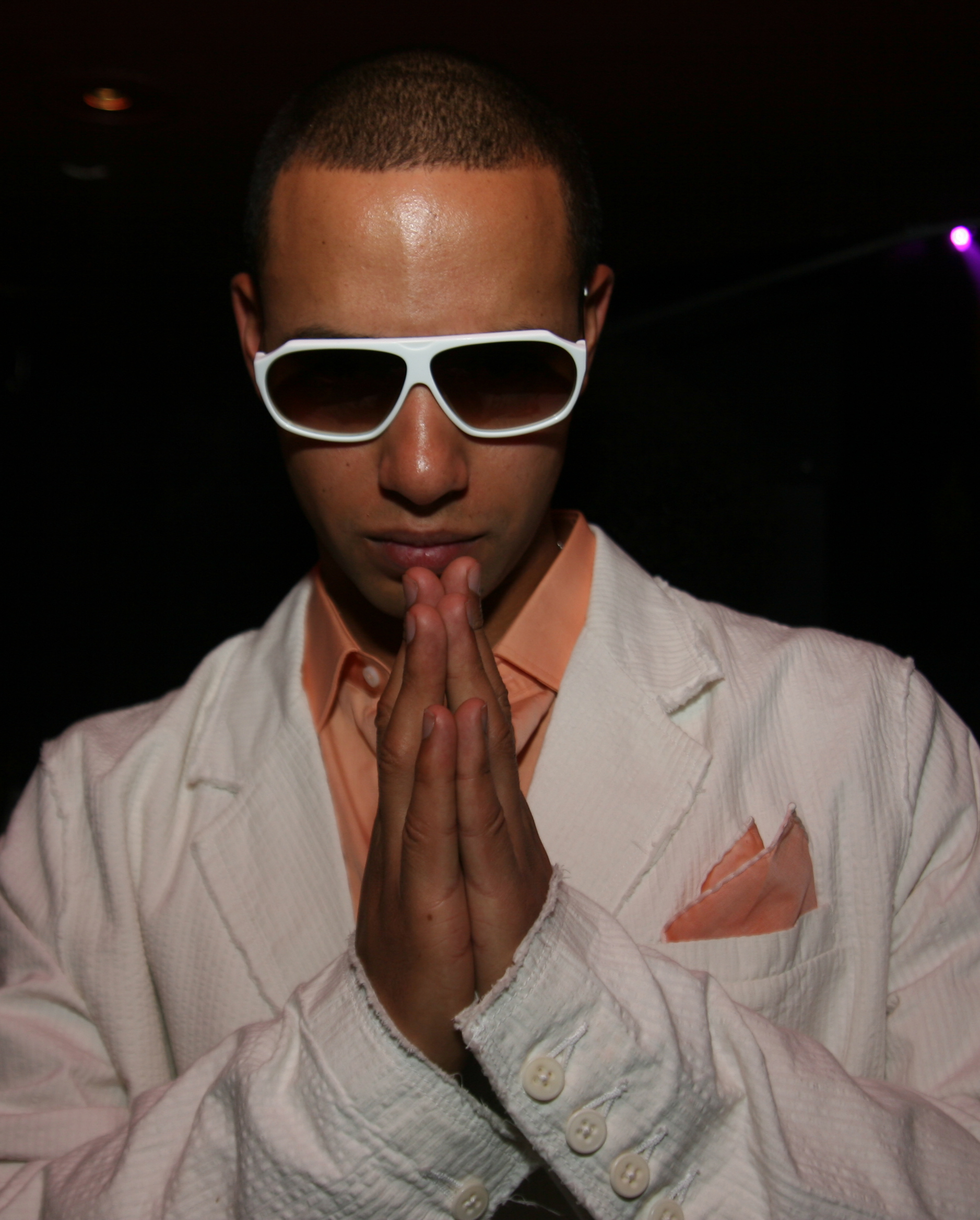
This was the sixth video directed by Director X featuring Drake.

On October 4, 2015, Drake announced a music video for the track via his Instagram account. The video was inspired by Sean Paul's "Gimme The Light" clip. The video was financed by Apple Inc., and released on October 19, 2015, via Apple Music under a timed exclusivity agreement. It was filmed in Toronto. The video, directed by Director X, was inspired by the work of American artist James Turrell. X has stated that he hopes that the video inspires men to dance more.

A portion from the Director X-directed music video featuring Drake make a rejection gesture, becoming a viral meme.

The music video also features choreographer Tanisha Scott recreating her previous work with Director X in the music video.

Rap-Up wrote that Drake "shows just how suave he can be with his moves" in this video. Evan Minsker of Pitchfork called it a "pretty minimal clip". The site also named "Hotline Bling" the seventh best music video of 2015.

The video, which has inspired many memes and parodies, including a commercial from T-Mobile during Super Bowl 50 featuring Drake himself (where representatives of a cellular operator attempt to make Drake add disclaimer-like caveats to the song's lyrics), helped the song rise in chart position according to NME. The song was parodied in the Saturday Night Live episode "Donald Trump/Sia", in which Trump briefly sang and danced while playing Drake's accountant. One of the most popular memes made from the music video is Wii Shop Bling, a mash up between Hotline Bling and the theme music for the Wii Shop Channel.

== Critical response ==
The song received mixed reviews. Leor Galil of the Chicago Reader praised Drake's performance in "Hotline Bling," stating that he "sounds hurt, neglected, and confused even while he's admonishing his ex," and that "it's hard to imagine anyone else pulling off this kind of song with the same verve". Jayson Greene of Pitchfork selected "Hotline Bling" as the "Best New Track" of the day, praising its "muted and intimate" beat and declaring it a "halting, aching song" about a man "a little too concerned" for a woman that could be a "rewrite" of "Roxanne" by The Police. Brad Wete of NPR hailed the song as both "remarkably catchy and damp with boo-hoo reflection," writing that "musically, it twinkles with bright organ riffs and boasts a bass line fit to thump in clubs" while its lyrics feature Drake "deeply wondering aloud, channeling the jealous ex in all of us". Rhian Daly of NME described the track's "simple and minimal" production as "secondary to Drake's emotions". Rolling Stone ranked "Hotline Bling" at number 3 on its year-end list to find the 50 best songs of 2015. Billboard ranked "Hotline Bling" at number 2 on its year-end critics' poll for 2015: "In a trio of freebies Drake plopped on SoundCloud in July, "Hotline Bling" was the only non-diss track. Backed by a tropical, groovy melody, "Hotline Bling" finds Drake giving a rap a hard pass and singing his heart out for some late-night loving through the phone. The record caught some drama, initially being referred to as a remix to Virginia rapper D.R.A.M.'s "Cha Cha." Still, the Toronto MVP got his dance on for the uber-viral video parodied by everyone from presidential candidate Donald Trump to Toronto Councillor Norm Kelly". Pitchfork named "Hotline Bling" the second best song of 2015, after Kendrick Lamar's "Alright". Time named "Hotline Bling" the eighth-best song of 2015. The Village Voice named "Hotline Bling" the best single released in 2015 on their annual year-end critics' poll, Pazz & Jop. In 2021, it was listed at No. 373 on Rolling Stone's "Top 500 Greatest Songs of All Time".

"Hotline Bling" also received criticism for the perceived sexist and controlling attitude expressed by the male narrator toward his female ex. Allyson Shiffman of Bullett took issue with the "super sexist lyrics," explaining that "while [the song is] packaged as a good old fashioned 'Why doesn't bae like me anymore?' Drake tune," what it is "really saying is, 'You used to wanna bone me all the time and now that I've left the 6, you've gotten a life of your own and I'm not okay with that'". Tahirah Hairston of Fusion wrote that, in the song, "Drake is distraught that his ex has moved on," but because he "opts for condescendingly slut-shaming her" and "dictating where she does and doesn't belong," it "comes off so petty that you forget his feelings are hurt".

== Covers and usage in media ==
"Hotline Bling"
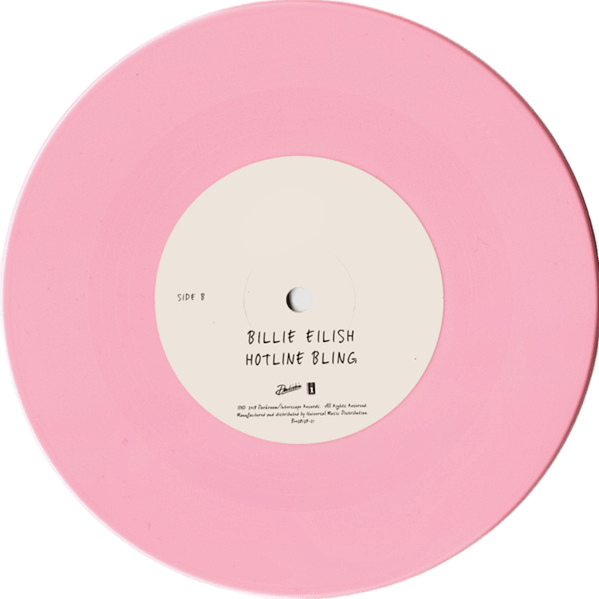
- US 7-inch single B-side label

Song by Billie Eilish
- A-side: "Party Favor"
- Released: April 21, 2018 (Original); May 9, 2023 ("Hotline (Edit)")
- Recorded: 2017
- Genre: Indie pop
- Length: 2:08 (original); 1:01 (single edit)
- Label: Darkroom; Interscope
- Songwriters: Aubrey Graham; Paul Jefferies; Timmy Thomas
- Producer: Finneas O'Connell

Alternative cover
- "Hotline (Edit)" cover

Canadian singer Justin Bieber recorded a cover version of the song and released it on October 30, 2015. At the 2016 iHeartRadio Music Awards the alternative version was nominated for the Best Cover Song. Dominican Rapper Messiah released a Spanish cover titled "El Celular" ("The Cellphone") on September 11, 2015. Dominican-American trio Vena released a bachata cover of the song featuring L.O.S. on November 19, 2015. American R&B singer Keyshia Cole released her own version of the song on September 27, 2015. Rapper Lil Wayne released his own version of the song from his mixtape No Ceilings 2. Singer Erykah Badu released a rewrite of the song on her 2015 mixtape But You Caint Use My Phone titled "Cel U Lar Device".

American singer Billie Eilish released a cover of "Hotline Bling" as the B-side of "Party Favor", on a pink 7-inch vinyl on April 21, 2018, coinciding with Record Store Day for that year. Eilish's cover was later released for digital download and streaming in June 2018 by Darkroom and Interscope Records. Sam Moore of NME described the genre of Eilish's cover of "Hotline Bling" as "delicate indie pop". An edited version of Eilish's cover was released as a digital promotional single on May 9, 2023.

W magazine uploaded a video with 13 celebrities reading the lyrics of the song in December 2015. The song was featured on the episode "She Gets Revenge" from American Horror Story: Hotel. "Hotline Bling" was the subject of a Super Bowl 50 advertisement for T-Mobile, in which Drake is interrupted by executives of cellphones provider seeking to make "improvements" to its lyrics. A variation of Drake's dancing in the music video was included in the multiplayer section of 2016's Uncharted 4: A Thief's End, renamed to "Bling Bling". The dance is also featured in 2014's Destiny, referred to only as "Strange Dance". Heroes of the Storm features a playable character named Dehaka, whose dance also mimics Drake's. On March 24, 2017, a Red Nose Day short that served as a sequel to the 2003 film Love Actually premiered and featured Hugh Grant reprising his dancing skills to "Hotline Bling".

The dance moves in the music video also inspired the opening sequence to the anime Keep Your Hands Off Eizouken!, according to a Crunchyroll interview with to one of its animators, Abel Gongora.

== Commercial performance ==
"Hotline Bling" entered the US Billboard Hot 100 chart dated August 22, 2015 at number 66. Its chart debut was fueled primarily by digital download sales, with 41,000 copies sold in its first week. The song soon became Drake's first top 10 in two years when the song reached number nine. It had peaked at number two on the chart dated October 24, 2015, tying as his second highest-charting single as a lead act at the time with "Best I Ever Had" which reached number two in 2009. The song has peaked at number two for five non-consecutive weeks, behind both "The Hills" by The Weeknd and "Hello" by Adele. As of February 2016, the song has sold over 2 million copies in the United States. "Hotline Bling" remained in the top ten of this chart for nineteen weeks before dropping out on February 13, 2016.

In the United Kingdom, "Hotline Bling" peaked at number three on the UK Singles Chart, becoming Drake's highest-charting song there (at the time) as a lead artist. The song also peaked at the top of the UK R&B Chart. On November 27, 2015, "Hotline Bling" received gold certification by the British Phonographic Industry.

== Charts ==
=== Weekly charts ===
Chart (2015–2017)	Peak position
Australia (ARIA)	2
Australian Urban (ARIA)	2
Austria (Ö3 Austria Top 40)	19
Belgium (Ultratop 50 Flanders)	8
Belgium Urban (Ultratop Flanders)	1
Belgium (Ultratop 50 Wallonia)	5
Canada Hot 100 (Billboard)	3
Czech Republic Airplay (ČNS IFPI)	69
Czech Republic Singles Digital (ČNS IFPI)	11
Denmark (Tracklisten)	5
Dominican Republic Airplay (Monitor Latino)	11
Euro Digital Song Sales (Billboard)	4
Finland (Suomen virallinen lista)	14
France (SNEP)	9
Germany (GfK)	18
Hungary (Single Top 40)	8
Hungary (Stream Top 40)	11
Ireland (IRMA)	8
Israel International Airplay (Media Forest)	3
Italy (FIMI)	9
Lebanon (Lebanese Top 20)	8
Mexico Airplay (Billboard)	9
Mexico Streaming (AMPROFON)	3
Netherlands (Dutch Top 40)	9
Netherlands (Single Top 100)	6
New Zealand (Recorded Music NZ)	14
Norway (VG-lista)	11
Poland Airplay (ZPAV)	82
Portugal (AFP)	6
Romania Airplay (Media Forest)	3
Romania TV Airplay (Media Forest)	2
Scottish Singles Sales (Official Charts)	12
Slovakia Airplay (ČNS IFPI)	81
Slovakia Singles Digital (ČNS IFPI)	5
South Africa Airplay (EMA)	3
Spain (Promusicae)	12
Sweden (Sverigetopplistan)	12
Switzerland (Schweizer Hitparade)	13
UK Singles (Official Charts)	3
UK Hip Hop/R&B (Official Charts)	1
US Billboard Hot 100	2
US Dance Airplay (Billboard)	6
US Hot R&B/Hip-Hop Songs (Billboard)	1
US Pop Airplay (Billboard)	2
US Rhythmic Airplay (Billboard)	1

=== Year-end charts ===
Chart (2015)	Position
Australia (ARIA)	43
Australia Urban (ARIA)	9
Canada (Canadian Hot 100)	43
France (SNEP)	90
Hungary (Single Top 40)	100
Italy (FIMI)	84
Netherlands (Dutch Top 40)	67
Netherlands (Single Top 100)	78
UK Singles (OCC)	40
US Billboard Hot 100	30
US Hot R&B/Hip-Hop Songs (Billboard)	8
US Rhythmic (Billboard)	26

Chart (2016)	Position
Australia Urban (ARIA)	18
Belgium (Ultratop Flanders)	100
Belgium (Ultratop Wallonia)	79
Canada (Canadian Hot 100)	25
France (SNEP)	76
Italy (FIMI)	58
Spain (PROMUSICAE)	70
Switzerland (Schweizer Hitparade)	73
UK Singles (OCC)	90
US Billboard Hot 100	24
US Hot R&B/Hip-Hop Songs (Billboard)	6
US Mainstream Top 40 (Billboard)	48
US Rhythmic (Billboard)	36

=== Decade-end charts ===
Chart (2010–2019)	Position
US Billboard Hot 100	92
US Hot R&B/Hip-Hop Songs (Billboard)	18

== Certifications ==
=== Drake version ===
Region	Certification	Certified units/sales
Australia (ARIA)	8× Platinum	560,000^{‡}
Belgium (BRMA)	Platinum	20,000^{‡}
Brazil (Pro-Música Brasil)	3× Diamond	750,000^{‡}
Canada (Music Canada)	Platinum	80,000^{*}
Denmark (IFPI Danmark)	2× Platinum	180,000^{‡}
France (SNEP)	Platinum	200,000^{‡}
Germany (BVMI)	Gold	200,000^{‡}
Italy (FIMI)	3× Platinum	150,000^{‡}
Mexico (AMPROFON)	3× Platinum+Gold	210,000^{‡}
New Zealand (RMNZ)	Gold	7,500^{*}
Poland (ZPAV)	Platinum	20,000^{‡}
Portugal (AFP)	Platinum	10,000^{‡}
Spain (Promusicae)	Platinum	40,000^{‡}
Sweden (GLF)	3× Platinum	120,000^{‡}
United Kingdom (BPI)	2× Platinum	1,200,000^{‡}
United States (RIAA)	Diamond	10,000,000^{‡}
^{*} Sales figures based on certification alone.^{‡} Sales+streaming figures based on certification alone.

=== Billie Eilish version ===
Region	Certification	Certified units/sales
Australia (ARIA)	Platinum	70,000^{‡}
Austria (IFPI Austria)	Gold	15,000^{‡}
Brazil (Pro-Música Brasil)	2× Platinum	80,000^{‡}
France (SNEP)	Gold	100,000^{‡}
New Zealand (RMNZ)	Gold	15,000^{‡}
United Kingdom (BPI)	Silver	200,000^{‡}
Streaming
Greece (IFPI Greece)	Gold	1,000,000^{†}
^{‡} Sales+streaming figures based on certification alone.^{†} Streaming-only figures based on certification alone.

== Release history ==
Country	Date	Format	Label
United States	July 31, 2015	Digital download	OVO Sound; Cash Money; Young Money; Republic

== See also ==
- Carrie & Lowell Live, featuring a cover of the song by Sufjan Stevens
