= Leaving Me =

Single by The Independents

from the album The First Time We Met
- B-side: "I Love You, Yes I Do"
- Released: January 1973
- Recorded: 1972
- Genre: R&B
- Length: 3:20
- Label: Wand
- Songwriters: Chuck Jackson, Marvin Yancy
- Producers: Chuck Jackson, Marvin Yancy

The Independents singles chronology
| "I Just Want to Be There" (1972) | "Leaving Me" (1973) | "Baby I've Been Missing You" (1973) |

"Leaving Me" is a 1973 crossover single by The Independents. The single was their biggest on the R&B chart, hitting #1 for one week. The single, which peaked at number twenty-one, was the only Top 40 hit for the group. It became a gold record. "Leaving Me" was written and produced by Chuck Jackson and Marvin Yancy.

| Preceded by "Funky Worm" by Ohio Players | Billboard Best Selling Soul Singles number-one single May 19, 1973 (one week) | Succeeded by "I'm Gonna Love You Just a Little More Baby" by Barry White |
