= Why Can't We Live Together (album) =

Studio album by Timmy Thomas
- Released: 1972
- Recorded: August and November 1972, Miami
- Genre: Soul; funk
- Length: 36:56
- Label: Glades Records
- Producer: Timmy Thomas; Steve Alaimo

Timmy Thomas chronology
Why Can't We Live Together (1972)	You're the Song I've Always Wanted to Sing (1974)

Why Can't We Live Together is the debut album by Timmy Thomas released in 1972. It was historically the first record to fully replace drummers with a drum machine. The album reached number ten in 1973 on the US R&B albums chart on the strength of the million-seller single, "Why Can't We Live Together".

== Background ==
"Why Can't We Live Together" and "Funky Me" were recorded Miami in August 1972, with the rest of the album recorded in November. Using the Glades Records studio, Thomas is the sole performer on the recordings; on the title track for instance, which took fifteen minutes to record, he played the organ parts with one hand and percussion on the organ with the other (using pre-programmed rhythms), using his feet to play bass on the organ pedals.

== Composition ==
Why Can't We Live Together is a sparse album of "soulful minimalism". The rhythm is dominant throughout the record. The album features topical themes, similar to its single. Although Thomas wrote most of the album, it also features two cover versions. Regarding his version of "The Coldest Days of My Life" by the Chi-Lites, Thomas said the original track gave him "a deep feeling of having experienced what they were singing about — the cold, cold feeling of being alone simply got through to me and I wanted to sing that song so badly." His decision to record "The First Time Ever I Saw Your Face" was for similar reasons, though he said "I experienced the feeling when it was included in the movie, Play Misty For Me."

The title track and "Rainbow Power" both discuss what Thomas described as race relations "getting out of hand," wishing to come up with songs "which would make people think again."

== Release and promotion ==
In an interview with the NME in March 1973, Thomas mentioned that "Rain Power" would "probably" be the second single.

== Critical reception ==
Professional ratings
Review scores
Source	Rating
AllMusic	2/5 stars

In a contemporary review of Why Can't We Live Together, a writer for the Acton Gazette described Thomas as "the new soul super-star" and hailed the "unforgettable", hypnotic hit single, but felt that the album becomes monotonous and samey due to Thomas' "obsessive use of his magic organ, with its built-in rhythm section," feeling it exposed the musician's "limited talents." They nonetheless wrote that "if the idea of hearing a string of different versions of 'Why Can't We Live Together' appeals to you, then you'll probably love it." Keith Hunt of the Thanet Times agreed that the "metronome-like backing, taping away track after track, gets monotonous," finding the organ playing to resemble "the sound you would expect to hear at a holiday camp." However, praise was given to Thomas' talents and the album's "flashes of brilliance." Russell Gersten of Rolling Stone was more harsh, describing the album as "a piece of junk" and commenting: "Thirty minutes of listening to a hack organist and a metronome playing basically the same song in eight variations is one of the most abrasive experiences I've undergone in months." In an article for Blues & Soul, John Abbey felt that although the album needed further instrumentation at times, "one cannot deny the tremendous achievement of the man for creating a whole album which, from a lesser talent, would undoubtedly have bored all and sundry to the point where the album would never have survived the full thirty-five minutes."

A retrospective article by Joseph Neff of The Vinyl District describes Why Can't We Live Together as "a pretty strong and rather underrated LP," writing that "the spare aura and the sound of that drum machine actually manage to conjure the sound of post-punk," highlighting the intro of "Funky Me" in particular for resembling Manchester post-punk, while feeling "the way the rhythms and the organ intertwine throughout the LP can give off hints of Yo La Tengo circa And Then Nothing Turned Itself Inside-Out." Reinforcing past criticisms, Andrew Hamilton of AllMusic describes the majority of album as "almost as sparse" as "Why Can't We Live Together," which he describes as "the cheapest Top Ten hit ever made," but criticises the album for being "forgettable" outside its title track, noting: "If you like a lot of production, you won't find it here."

== Track listing ==
All songs written and arranged by Timmy Thomas except where indicated

1. "Why Can't We Live Together"
2. "Rainbow Power"
3. "Take Care of Home"
4. "The First Time Ever I Saw Your Face" (Ewan McColl)
5. "The Coldest Days of My Life" (Carl Davis, Eugene Record)
6. "In The Beginning"
7. "Cold Cold People"
8. "Opportunity"
9. "Dizzy Dizzy World"
10. "Funky Me"

== Charts ==
Chart (1973)	Peak position
Billboard Top Pop Albums	53
Billboard Top Soul Albums	10

=== Singles ===
Year	Single	Chart positions	
Year	Single	US Pop	US R&B
1973	"Why Can't We Live Together"	3	1
