= You're the Song I've Always Wanted to Sing =

Studio album by Timmy Thomas
- Released: 1974
- Recorded: 1973–1974
- Genre: Funk; soul
- Length: 33:36
- Label: Glades; TK; Polydor
- Producer: Steve Alaimo; Betty Wright (track 3); Willie Clarke (tracks 1 & 8)

Timmy Thomas chronology
Why Can't We Live Together (1972)	You're the Song I've Always Wanted to Sing (1974)	The Magician (1976)

You're the Song I've Always Wanted to Sing is the second studio album by American R&B singer Timmy Thomas, released in 1974 by Glades and TK Records. The album was re-released on CD in 2004 by EMI.

Joining Timmy Thomas on this outing were other Henry Stone musicians and vocalists who recorded on the labels Glades, TK and Polydor. They were Betty Wright, George "Chocolate" Perry, Jerome Smith, and Willie "Little Beaver" Hale.

== Track listing ==
All tracks are written by Timmy Thomas, except where noted.

Side one
No.	Title	Writer(s)	Length
1.	"You're the Song (I've Always Wanted to Sing)"	Stanley McKenny; Timmy Thomas	3:19
2.	"I've Got to See You Tonight"	Willie "Little Beaver" Hale	3:18
3.	"Sweet Brown Sugar"	Betty Wright	3:08
4.	"Deep in You"		3:37
5.	"Spread Us Around"	Steve Alaimo; Timmy Thomas	2:56

Side two
No.	Title	Writer(s)	Length
6.	"One Brief Moment"		3:48
7.	"What Can I Tell Her"	Brad Shapiro; Clarence Reid; Willie Clarke	5:49
8.	"Ebony Affair"		3:50
9.	"Let Me Be Your Eyes"	Harry Wayne Casey; Thomas	3:51
Total length:			33:36

== Personnel ==
- Timmy Thomas – lead vocals, keyboards
- Willie "Little Beaver" Hale – guitar
- Jerome Smith – guitar
- George "Chocolate" Perry – bass guitar
- Ron Bogdon – bass guitar
- Robert Ferguson – drums
- Robert Johnson – drums
- Betty Wright – backing vocals
- Margaret Reynolds – backing vocals
