= Touch to Touch =

Studio album by Timmy Thomas
- Released: 1977
- Genre: Latin; disco
- Label: TK Records
- Producer: King Sporty

Timmy Thomas chronology
The Magician (1976)	Touch to Touch (1977)	Live (1979)

Touch to Touch is an album by Timmy Thomas released during 1977.

== Track listing ==
All tracks composed by Noel Williams; except where noted

1. "Touch to Touch"
2. "Africano"
3. "When a House Got Music" (Luther Dixon)
4. "Game of Life" (Timmy Thomas)
5. "Love For the People"
6. "Torrid Zone"
7. "Diane" (Timmy Thomas)
8. "Sweet Music"

== Personnel ==
- Timmy Thomas - lead vocals, keyboards
- Bert Bailey - lead guitar
- Wayne Harris - rhythm guitar
- Carl Crowder, Jerry Thompson - bass
- Charles Hollis, Donald Bennett - drums
- Harold McKinney - percussion, flute
- Betty Wright - backing vocals
- Mike Lewis - string arrangements
- Deep Roots Band - horns, horn arrangements

Technical

- Alex Sadkin, Jack Nuber - engineer
- Joe Elbert - photography
