= Walter Meskell =

American songwriter

Walter Edward Meskell (born 1948, died August 19, 2024) was an American musician and record producer with numerous credits to his name, including producing and/or writing several top 10 hits for Tony DeFranco and the DeFranco Family amongst other accomplishments. He was born to Vernice and John Meskell in 1946. He spent his childhood in Southern California near Pasadena in the city of San Marino, California. He developed into a talented musician, specializing in banjo and guitar, and by his late teens was playing professionally. He got his big break performing with Doc Severinsen and playing banjo in The Tonight Show Band. He wrote songs which were recorded by many well-known artists of the time, including Sammy Davis Jr. Meskell went on to work as one of the top session musicians in Los Angeles during the 1960s, playing with The Wrecking Crew drummer Hal Blaine and guitarist Larry Carlton amongst others.

In the early 1970s, he worked with Tim Martin. In 1973, he co-produced Tony DeFranco and the De Franco Family's bubblegum pop debut album, which scored the #3 hit single, "Heartbeat, It's a Lovebeat". In Quentin Tarantino's film, Reservoir Dogs, the song is name checked as a gem from the 1970s. The song was later covered by The Replacements.

Meskell also collaborated with top television theme song artist Mike Post appearing on several of his albums, and also worked with Post on a song for the Spiral Starecase's More Today Than Yesterday album. Meskell also worked with C.W. McCall and was involved with the top 40 theme song from the movie Convoy, as well as the movie's soundtrack. Meskell contributed to many other music projects of note during the 1970s, and now lives near Nashville, where he maintains an active role in the city's music scene.

Walt Meskell died on August 19, 2024
