= Heartbeat - It's a Lovebeat =

"Heartbeat (It's a Lovebeat)"

Single by The DeFranco Family

from the album Heartbeat (It's a Lovebeat)
- B-side: "Sweet, Sweet Loretta"
- Released: May 1973
- Genre: Bubblegum pop
- Length: 2:59
- Label: 20th Century Records
- Songwriters: Mike Kennedy, Greg Williams
- Producer: Walter Meskell

The DeFranco Family singles chronology
"Heartbeat (It's a Lovebeat)" (1973)	"Abra-Ca-Dabra" (1973)

"Heartbeat - It's a Lovebeat" is a 1973 single by the Canadian group The DeFranco Family. It was the title track of their first album and the group's debut single.

== Charts ==
The song was a success in the United States and Canada. It reached No.3 in both nations, as well as reaching No.6 in Australia. It was their highest ranking song, and it became a gold record in the US. Were it not for Carly Simon's "You're So Vain", "Heartbeat" would have been the No.1 song for 1973 on WLS, having racked up five consecutive weeks at No.1 there, from 20 October through 17 November.

=== Weekly charts ===
Chart (1973)	Peak position
Australia (Kent Music Report)	6
Canada RPM Top Singles	3
Canada RPM Adult Contemporary	32
US Billboard Hot 100	3
US Billboard Adult Contemporary	49
US Cash Box Top 100	1

=== Year-end charts ===
Chart (1973)	Rank
Australia (Kent Music Report)	55
Canada	31
US Cash Box Top 100	83

== Television appearances ==
"Heartbeat - It's a Lovebeat" was performed multiple times on various television programs, including The Mike Douglas Show, The Sonny & Cher Comedy Hour, Jack Benny's Second Farewell Show, American Bandstand, and Dinah!

== Cover versions ==
- The song appears as a bonus track on the Deluxe Edition of The Replacements' album Let It Be.
- The song appears on the 2023 debut album of the Trans-Canada Highwaymen featuring members of Odds, Barenaked Ladies, Sloan and The Pursuit of Happiness.

== In popular culture ==
- Reservoir Dogs: Mr. Pink mentions hearing "Heartbeat" on the radio for the first time since he was in the 5th Grade.

== See also ==
- List of Cash Box Top 100 number-one singles of 1973
