= The Independents (vocal group) =

American R&B vocal group

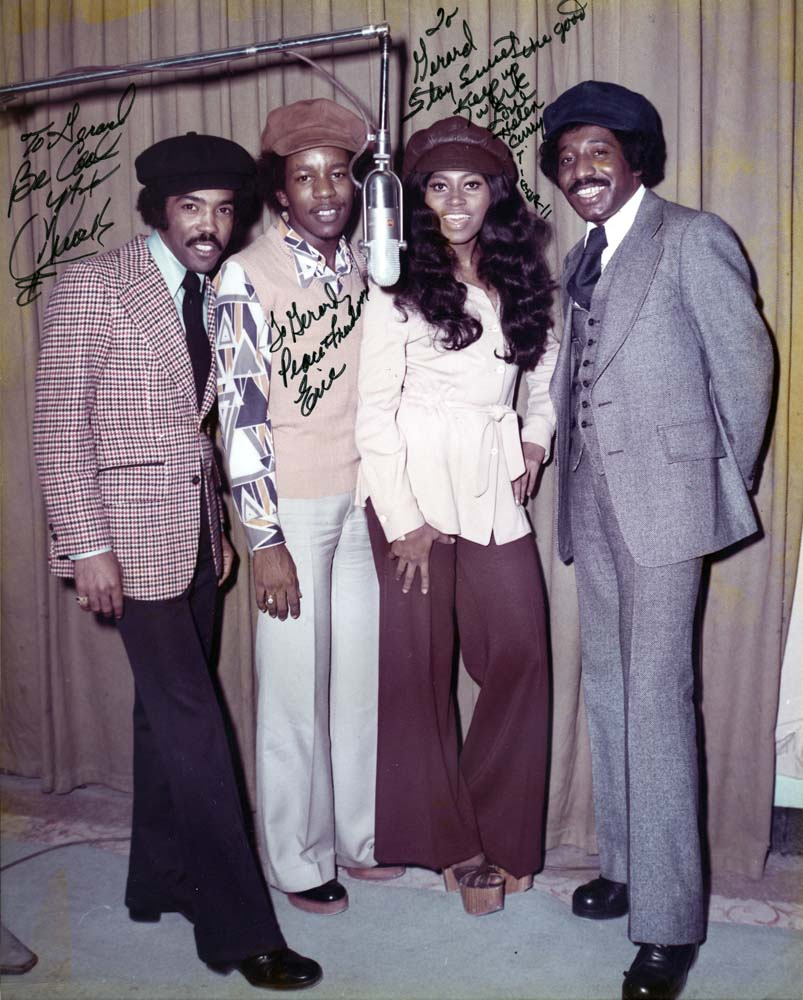
The Independents at WTBS (now WMBR) in Cambridge, Massachusetts

The Independents were an American R&B vocal group active from 1971 to 1975. They scored several hits on the U.S. Pop and R&B charts. Their 1973 song "Leaving Me" reached No. 21 on the Billboard Hot 100, and remained on the chart for 14 weeks. Sales of more than a million copies led to a gold record being awarded by the R.I.A.A. on May 23, 1973.

After the group broke up and recording the solo albums, Passionate Breezes and Gonna Getcha Love, Chuck Jackson, along with fellow group member Marvin Yancy, achieved success as the producers and writers for most of Natalie Cole's early chart releases, and also had success with Phyllis Hyman and Ronnie Dyson. Jackson is the half-brother of the Reverend Jesse Jackson and is not related to singer Chuck Jackson. In 2019, original member Maurice Jackson (no relation) reformed The Independents with Theo Huff, Rashan Thompson, Vanessa Lainey, Parkas Alexander and himself.

== Members ==
- Charles "Chuck" Jackson - born 22 March 1945, Greenville, South Carolina
- Maurice Jackson - born 12 June 1942, Chicago
- Helen Curry - born Clarksdale, Mississippi
- Eric Thomas - born Chicago
- Marvin Jerome Yancy - born 31 May 1950, Chicago - March 22, 1985

== Discography ==
=== Albums ===
==== Studio albums ====
Year	Title	Peak chart positions		Record label
Year	Title	US	US R&B	Record label
1972	The First Time We Met	127	18	Wand
1973	Chuck, Helen, Eric, Maurice	—	—	Wand
"—" denotes releases that did not chart or were not released.

==== Compilation albums ====
Year	Title	Peak	Record label
Year	Title	US R&B	Record label
1974	Discs of Gold	42	Wand
1991	Leaving Me: Their Golden Classics	—	Collectables
2016	Just As Long: The Complete Wand Recordings 1972-74	—	Kent Soul
"—" denotes releases that did not chart or were not released.

=== Singles ===
Year	Single	Peak chart positions	
Year	Single	US	US R&B
1972	"Just as Long as You Need Me (Part 1)"	84	8
1972	"I Just Want to Be There"	113	38
1973	"Leaving Me"	21	1
1973	"Baby I've Been Missing You"	41	4
1973	"It's All Over"	65	12
1974	"The First Time We Met"	103	20
1974	"Arise and Shine (Let's Get It On)"	—	19
1974	"Let This Be a Lesson to You"	88	7
"—" denotes releases that did not chart or were not released.
