= Funky Worm =

Single by Ohio Players

from the album Pleasure
- B-side: "Paint Me"
- Released: January 16, 1973
- Recorded: 1972
- Genre: Funk
- Length: 2:41
- Label: Westbound
- Songwriter: Ohio Players
- Producer: Ohio Players

Ohio Players singles chronology
"Varee Is Love" (1972)	"Funky Worm" (1973)	"Ecstasy" (1973)

"Funky Worm" is a song by American funk group the Ohio Players, from their album Pleasure. It peaked at number one on the U.S. Billboard R&B chart in 1973 and also peaked at number fifteen on the Billboard Hot 100. Billboard ranked it as the No. 84 song for 1973.

== Influence ==
The song's ARP synthesizer solos, played by Walter "Junie" Morrison, have become a staple part in hip-hop sampling history, being sampled by artists such as MC Breed, Too $hort, Dr. Dre, Xzibit and The Game. The high-pitched whine of the synthesizer on the song was often emulated by West Coast hip-hop producers and became a staple in G-funk music.

N.W.A notably sampled "Funky Worm" on their songs "Dope Man" from their 1987 compilation N.W.A. and the Posse and "Gangsta Gangsta" from their 1988 album Straight Outta Compton. Ice Cube sampled "Funky Worm" for his songs "Wicked" (featuring Don Jagwarr) from his 1992 album The Predator and "'Ghetto Bird" from his 1993 album Lethal Injection.

Lil' ½ Dead's 1994 song "Eastside, Westside" (featuring Tha Chill) from his album The Dead Has Arisen, Tim Dog's 1993 song "Skip to My Loot" (featuring Smooth B) from his album Do or Die, DJ Jazzy Jeff and the Fresh Prince's 1993 hit "Boom! Shake the Room" from their album Code Red and Ruff Ryders' 1999 song "Bug Out" from the compilation Ryde or Die Vol. 1. also sample the song. It was also sampled in De La Soul's "Me Myself & I", off their 1989 album 3 Feet High and Rising. The song was also for the ring entrance for wrestling stable Latin American Xchange.

== In popular culture ==
The song can be heard on the fictional radio station Bounce FM, in the video game Grand Theft Auto: San Andreas. The Google Doodle celebrating the 44th anniversary of hip-hop (August 11, 2017) featured the song on a virtual record that allows users to "scratch". The song can also be heard as a player anthem in the video game Rocket League, where it was released in a pack called "Behind The Samples" for free on February 1, 2022.

An ancestral caecilian – a worm-shaped amphibian – whose fossils were recovered from Late Triassic rocks in Arizona was named Funcusvermis in reference to this song.

== Charts ==
Chart (1973)	Peak position
U.S. Billboard Hot 100	15
U.S. Billboard Best Selling Soul Singles	1
