= Timmy Thomas =

American R&B singer (1944–2022)

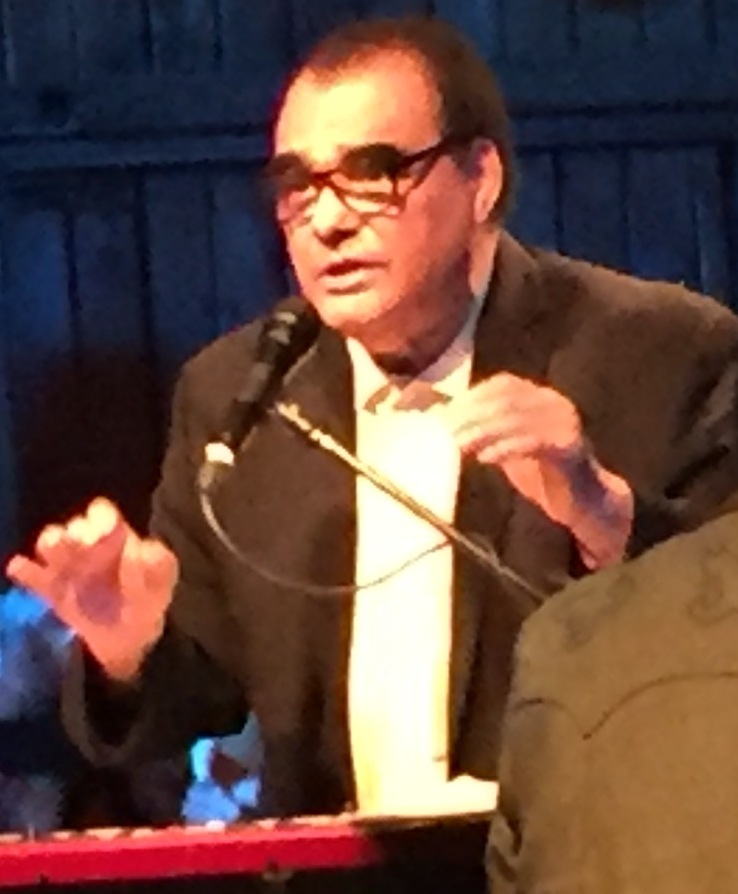
- Thomas at SXSW 2016

Background information
- Born: Timothy Earle Thomas; November 13, 1944; Evansville, Indiana, U.S.
- Died: March 11, 2022 (aged 77) Miami, Florida, U.S.
- Genres: R&B; soul
- Occupations: Singer; songwriter; musician; record producer
- Instruments: Keyboards; organ; vocals
- Years active: 1964–2015
- Labels: Glades; Marlin; Gold Mountain

Timothy Earle Thomas (November 13, 1944 – March 11, 2022) was an American R&B singer, keyboardist, songwriter, and record producer, best known for the hit song, "Why Can't We Live Together".

== Life and career ==
Thomas was born in Evansville, Indiana, on November 13, 1944, one of twelve siblings. He first attracted interest in his work as an accompanist with Donald Byrd and Cannonball Adderley, before working as a session musician in Memphis, Tennessee, and releasing singles on the Goldwax Records label. He had little solo success until he moved to Glades Records in Miami, Florida, and in late 1972 he released "Why Can't We Live Together". The record topped the U.S. Billboard R&B chart, made the top three on the Billboard Hot 100, and top 20 in other countries including the United Kingdom where it peaked at number 12 on the UK Singles Chart. This disc sold over two million copies.

He was earlier part of a group called Phillip & the Faithfuls, which also included the singer Phillip Reynolds, releasing material for the Goldwax imprint, including "Love Me", "What'Cha Gonna Do" and "'If You Love Her" (all in 1964). He then became a session musician in Memphis, continuing to release solo sides for Goldwax, including "Have Some Boogaloo". He also released "It's My Life" in 1967. In 1970, he had switched labels to the Climax imprint and one side called "What's Bothering Me". Relocating to Miami, Florida, in 1972, Thomas played sessions for the TK group labels, signing to the Glades Records imprint, where, later that year, he released "Why Can't We Live Together".

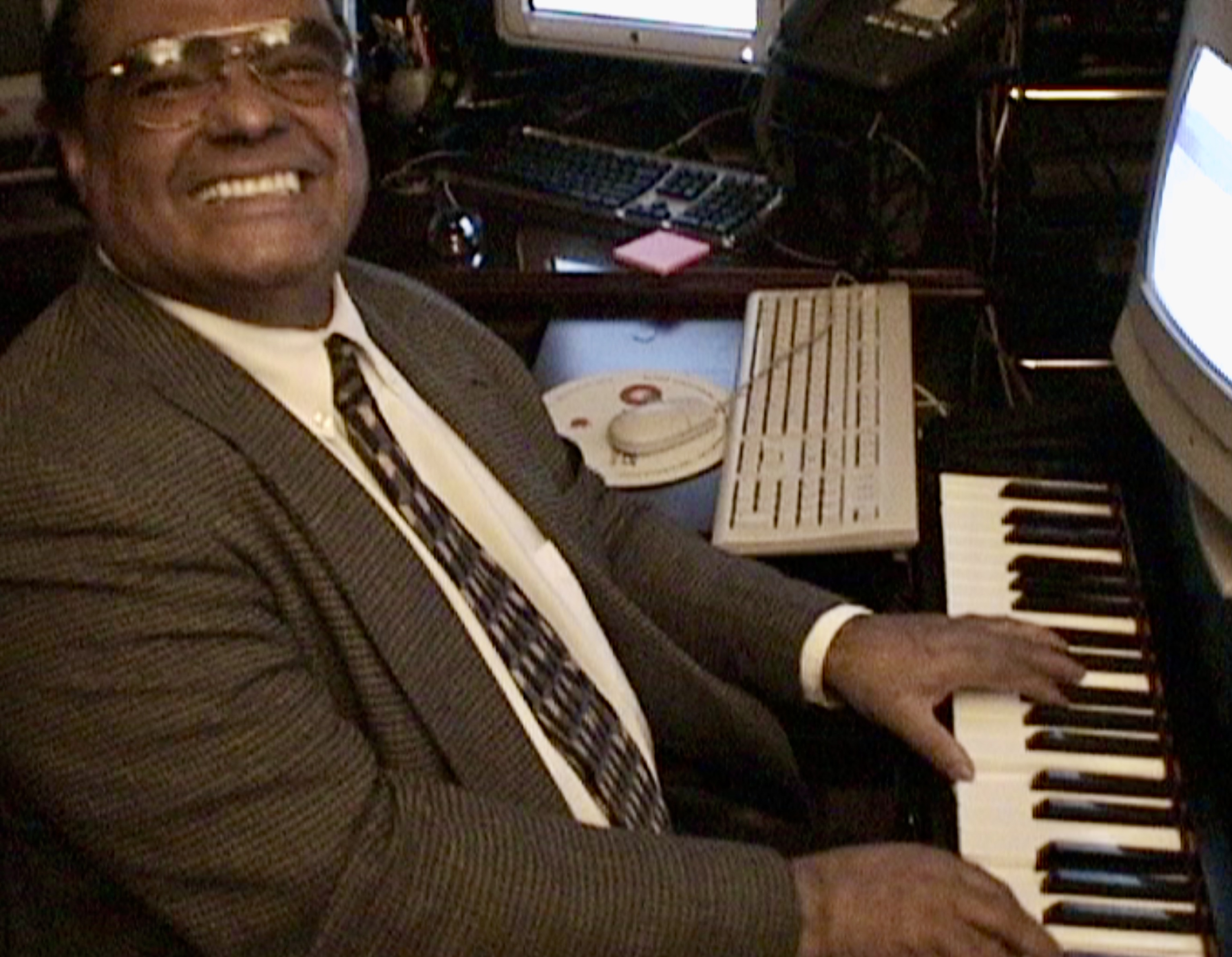
Timmy Thomas recording "Turtle Blues", Miami 2000

Thomas followed up the release with "People Are Changin'" (B-side "Rainbow Power") which reached the charts in 1973. In 1974, he released the album You're the Song I've Always Wanted to Sing. He went on to release six further Glades singles and then, in 1975 recorded a duet with Betty Wright entitled "It's What They Can't See". From 1976 through 1980, Thomas recorded singles for both the Glades imprint and the T.K. Disco label, including "Stone to the Bone", "Africano", "Touch to Touch", "The Magician", "Freak In, Freak Out" and "Drown in My Own Tears" and the albums The Magician (Glades, 1976) and Touch to Touch (Glades, 1977). He also continued to work on sessions for TK Records artists, including Gwen McCrae, and in later years as a producer.

Thomas went on to record several R&B hits culminating in "Gotta Give a Little Love (Ten Years After)", a U.S. top 30 soul entry in 1984 for Gold Mountain Records. Thomas appeared on Nicole McCloud's 1985 album What About Me?, singing on a duet with her called "New York Eyes". This track reached number 41 in the UK.

In the 1990s, he worked as a producer for LaFace Records and released the album With Heart and Soul for DTM Records. Also, his song "(Dying Inside) To Hold You" was a hit in the Philippines, and gained further popularity in 2017 when it was covered by Darren Espanto for the film All of You.

In 2015, Drake sampled Thomas' signature hit, "Why Can't We Live Together", on his single "Hotline Bling".

Thomas died of cancer on March 11, 2022, at the age of 77.

== Discography ==
=== Albums ===
Year	Album	Peak chart positions	
Year	Album	US Pop	US R&B
1972	Why Can't We Live Together	53	10
1974	You're the Song I've Always Wanted to Sing	—	—
1976	The Magician	—	—
1977	Touch to Touch	—	—
1979	Live	—	—
1984	Gotta Give a Little Love (Ten Years After)	—	—
1994	With Heart and Soul	—	—
"—" denotes releases that did not chart or were not released in that territory.

=== Singles ===
Year	Single	Chart positions					
Year	Single	US Pop	US R&B	US Dance	AUS	UK	CAN (RPM)
1972	"Why Can't We Live Together"	3	1	—	25	12	6
1973	"People Are Changin'"	75	23	—	—	—	—
1973	"Let Me Be Your Eyes"	107	48	—	—	—	—
1973	"What Can I Tell Her"	102	19	—	—	—	—
1974	"One Brief Moment"	—	62	—	—	—	—
1974	"I've Got to See You Tonight" / "You're the Song (I've Always Wanted to Sing)"	— —	31; 78	—	—	—	—
1974	"Deep in You"	—	—	—	—	—	—
1975	"Sexy Woman"	—	69	—	—	—	—
1975	"Ebony Affair"	—	—	—	—	—	—
1976	"Love Shine"	—	—	—	—	—	—
1976	"The Magician" (UK only)	—	—	—	—	—	—
1977	"Stone to the Bone"	—	74	12	—	—	—
1977	"Touch to Touch"	—	—	32	—	—	—
1978	"Freak In, Freak Out"	—	92	—	—	—	—
1980	"Drown in My Own Tears"	—	—	—	—	—	—
1981	"Are You Crazy???" (Pt. 1)	—	73	—	—	—	—
1982	"My Last Affair"	—	—	—	—	—	—
1984	"Gotta Give a Little Love (Ten Years After)"	80	29	28	—	—	—
1984	"Love Is Never Too Late"	—	90	—	—	—	—
1985	"New York Eyes" (with Nicole)	—	—	—	—	41	—
1990	"Why Can't We Live Together" (remix)	—	—	—	—	54	—
1990	"(Dying Inside) To Hold You"	—	—	—	—	—	—
1991	"What Do You Say to a Lady" (with Jackie Moore)	—	—	—	—	—	—
"—" denotes releases that did not chart or were not released in that territory.

== See also ==
- List of artists who reached number one on the Billboard R&B chart
- List of Hot Soul Singles number ones of 1973
- List of disco artists (S-Z)
- List of funk musicians
- List of soul musicians
- List of Soul Train episodes
- List of 1970s one-hit wonders in the United States
