= Pillow Talk (song) =

- Side-A label of the 7-inch single

Single by Sylvia

from the album Pillow Talk
- B-side: "My Thing"
- Released: March 1973
- Genre: Soul; proto-disco
- Length: 4:20; 3:41 (single edit)
- Label: Vibration
- Songwriters: Sylvia Robinson; Michael Burton
- Producers: Sylvia Robinson; Michael Burton

Sylvia singles chronology
"A Million Tears" (1954)	"Pillow Talk" (1973)	"Have You Had Any Lately" (1973)

"Pillow Talk" is a 1973 song by American singer and songwriter Sylvia, written by Sylvia along with Michael Burton.

== History ==
According to Billboard, the song is about sex. Sylvia had originally hoped the song would be recorded by Al Green, who turned it down as he thought it was too risqué and against his religious beliefs. Thereafter, Sylvia decided to return as a musical artist and record "Pillow Talk" herself, finally releasing the song in 1973. "Pillow Talk" is an early example of prototypical disco music. The vocals are replete with moaning and heavy breathing, predating Donna Summer's orgasmic moans on 1975's "Love to Love You Baby". At the coda section, Sylvia growls out the phrase: "Aw, Would Ya". Several AM radio stations shortened the song, due to its sexual content, omitting the coda portions where Sylvia intones in a whisper "Oh, My God", and repeatedly, "Nice steady!".

== Chart performance ==
"Pillow Talk" spent two weeks at number one on the Best Selling Soul Singles chart and peaked at number three on the Billboard Hot 100.

== Accolades ==
The song was nominated for Best Female R&B Vocal Performance at the 1974 Grammy Awards, losing to "Master of Your Eyes (The Deepness of Your Eyes)" by Aretha Franklin.

== Track listing ==
- 7" single

A. "Pillow Talk" – 3:41
B. "My Thing" – 2:45

== Charts ==
=== Weekly charts ===
Chart (1973)	Peak position
Australia (Kent Music Report)	59
Canada Top Singles (RPM)	3
Ireland (IRMA)	18
New Zealand (Listener)	15
UK Singles (Official Charts)	14
US Billboard Hot 100	3
US Best Selling Soul Singles (Billboard)	1
US Cash Box Top 100	2

=== Year-end charts ===
Chart (1973)	Position
Canada Top Singles (RPM)	45
US Billboard Hot 100	22
US Cash Box Top 100	29

== Cover versions ==
- In 1979, disco singer Fern Kinney covered the song on her debut album Groove Me.
- In 1983, an Italo disco version of the song was released by Lustt, which was later sampled by vaporwave artist Saint Pepsi in the song "Private Caller" in 2013.
- In 1983, singer Tanya Jackson covered the song. This version became very popular at discos around Asia and Europe.
- In 1993, singer Janet Jackson covered the song for her janet. album but it was not used. Jackson later stated in 2018, "Not sure what I was thinking when I excluded it. Now that I'm hearing it for the first time in years, maybe I made a mistake. Maybe it should have gone on the record. Maybe I just wasn't willing to do a cover because of my eagerness to hone my craft as a writer.".
- In 1999, R&B singer Cherelle did a cover on her LP, "The Right Time".
- In 2006, R&B singer Miki Howard recorded a cover version for her album, Pillow Talk.
- In 2012, Joss Stone covered it for The Soul Sessions Vol. 2.

== See also ==
- List of number-one R&B singles of 1973 (U.S.)
