= The DeFranco Family =

Canadian 1970s pop music group

- Origin: Port Colborne, Ontario; Canada
- Genre: Bubblegum pop
- Years active: 1972–1978, 2000
- Label: 20th Century Fox Records
- Past members: Tony DeFranco; Benny DeFranco; Marisa DeFranco; Nino DeFranco; Merlina DeFranco

The DeFranco Family, featuring Tony DeFranco, was a 1970s pop music group and family from Port Colborne, Ontario, Canada. The group, all siblings, consisted of guitarist Benny DeFranco (born 11 July 1953); keyboardist Marisa DeFranco (born 23 July 1954); guitarist Nino DeFranco (born 19 October 1955); drummer Merlina DeFranco (born 20 July 1957); and lead singer Tony DeFranco (born 31 August 1959).

The group had a number of hits between 1973 and 1977, including "Abra-Ca-Dabra" and their biggest hit, "Heartbeat - It's a Lovebeat." Either Tony DeFranco or the entire family made frequent appearances in the teen magazines of this period, such as Tiger Beat and Flip. By the late 1970s, the group had faded from the pop scene.

== Biography ==
The five siblings who comprised the DeFranco Family were born to Italian immigrant parents and raised in Port Colborne and Welland, Ontario. Initially performing as the DeFranco Quintet, the group found success after a demo tape of their songs was heard by Sharon Lee, editor of teen magazine Tiger Beat. Impressed by what she heard, Lee arranged for Charles Laufer to fly the group to Los Angeles for an audition. Laufer signed the group to an exclusive deal with his company, Laufer Entertainment, financed a three-song demo, and helped them to secure a contract with 20th Century Records.

The DeFranco Family recorded at United Western Recorders studios in Hollywood with accompaniment by Wrecking Crew veterans Hal Blaine on drums, Larry Carlton on guitar, and Max Bennett on bass. They appeared on Dick Clark's American Bandstand nine times.

With their lighthearted approach to music, the DeFranco Family became a successful pop music act in the mid-1970s. They benefited from two major factors: the imposition of Canadian content regulations that encouraged Canadian radio stations to broadcast songs by artists from their home country, and the early 1970s popularity of two other family quintets often led by preteens, The Osmonds and The Jackson 5. The DeFranco Family's debut 1973 single, "Heartbeat - It's a Lovebeat," featuring the lead vocals of then 13-year-old Tony DeFranco, reached number one on WLS for five straight weeks (and was number two there for the entire year 1973), number three in the U.S. on the Billboard Hot 100 chart and the top slot on the Cashbox singles chart, as well as hitting number three in their native Canada on the RPM 100 national Top Singles chart, selling more than two million copies in the process. It was awarded a gold disc by the R.I.A.A in November 1973. The song's writer, Purdue alumnus Michael T. Kennedy, was a long-time executive at Boeing/McDonnell Douglas. Their second single, "Abra-Ca-Dabra," which reached the Top 40, was followed by their final hit, "Save the Last Dance for Me," which reached number 18 on the charts in May 1974. Much of their success in 1973 came at the expense of the Osmonds, who (themselves making an attempt at proselytizing with their music that year) declined in popularity, though they would recover in 1974.

The DeFranco Family's active career reached a roadblock after that point. Family quintets were beginning to fall out of favor in the mid-1970s as disco began ascending (the Osmonds similarly saw a drop in popularity at the same time, while the Jackson 5 quickly adapted to disco), which coincided with Tony's voice changing because of puberty. A rock version of their tune "Write Me a Letter" failed to generate much attention and reached no higher than the 104th slot on the charts. Although their earlier hits had been produced by Walt Meskell, the disappointing sales of "Write Me a Letter" prompted their record label, 20th Century Records, to fire Meskell and team the group with Mike Curb, who had previously worked with The Osmonds. But the collaboration proved disastrous. When Curb attempted to recast the group as a cover band, they resisted and severed their relationship with their publisher and manager, Charles Laufer and Laufer Entertainment, and 20th Century Records.

Unable to attract interest from another label, they continued to tour and perform in Las Vegas until they ceased performing in 1978. A reunion concert at Rhino Records' Retro Fest in August 1999 was followed by the family's final performance at B.B. King's Nightclub in Los Angeles in April 2000.

The siblings took up residences in California within an hour's drive from each other and remain close. Although the family gave up its involvement in the music industry, Tony and Marisa perform on occasion. Tony is a real estate agent with Sotheby's International.

== Discography ==
=== Albums ===
- Heartbeat - It's a Lovebeat (1973) [Hot 200: #109; RPM: #31]
- Save the Last Dance for Me (1974) [Hot 200: #163; Record World: #88]

=== Singles ===
- 1973 "Heartbeat - It's a Lovebeat” [Hot 100: #3; Cash Box: #1(1); Record World: #1(1); RPM: #3; Australia: #6]
- 1973 "Abra-ca-dabra" [Hot 100: #32; Cash Box: #23; Record World: #22; RPM: #15]
- 1974 "Save the Last Dance for Me" [Hot 100: #18; Cash Box: #16; Record World: # 18; RPM: #8]
- 1974 "Write Me a Letter" [Billboard Bubbling Under: #104; Cash Box: #120; RPM: #90(2)]
- 1975 "We Belong Together" [Record World: #108;]
- 1976 "Venus" [Released in Japan]

== Television appearances ==
- Dinah!
  - January 23, 1974
  - March 17, 1974
  - April 16, 1974
  - August 19, 1974
  - August 28, 1974
- The Mike Douglas Show
  - April 2, 1974
  - June 27, 1974
  - August 12, 1974
- Jack Benny's Second Farewell Special
  - January 24, 1974 (taped: December 15–16, 1973)
- The Sonny & Cher Comedy Hour
  - February 13, 1974
- American Bandstand
  - July 14, 1973
  - February 2, 1974
  - June 1, 1974
  - September 21, 1974
- Action '73
  - October 27, 1973
- Action '74
  - April 27, 1974
- The Brady Bunch Hour
  - January 23, 1977
