= List of Billboard Hot 100 number ones of 1973 =

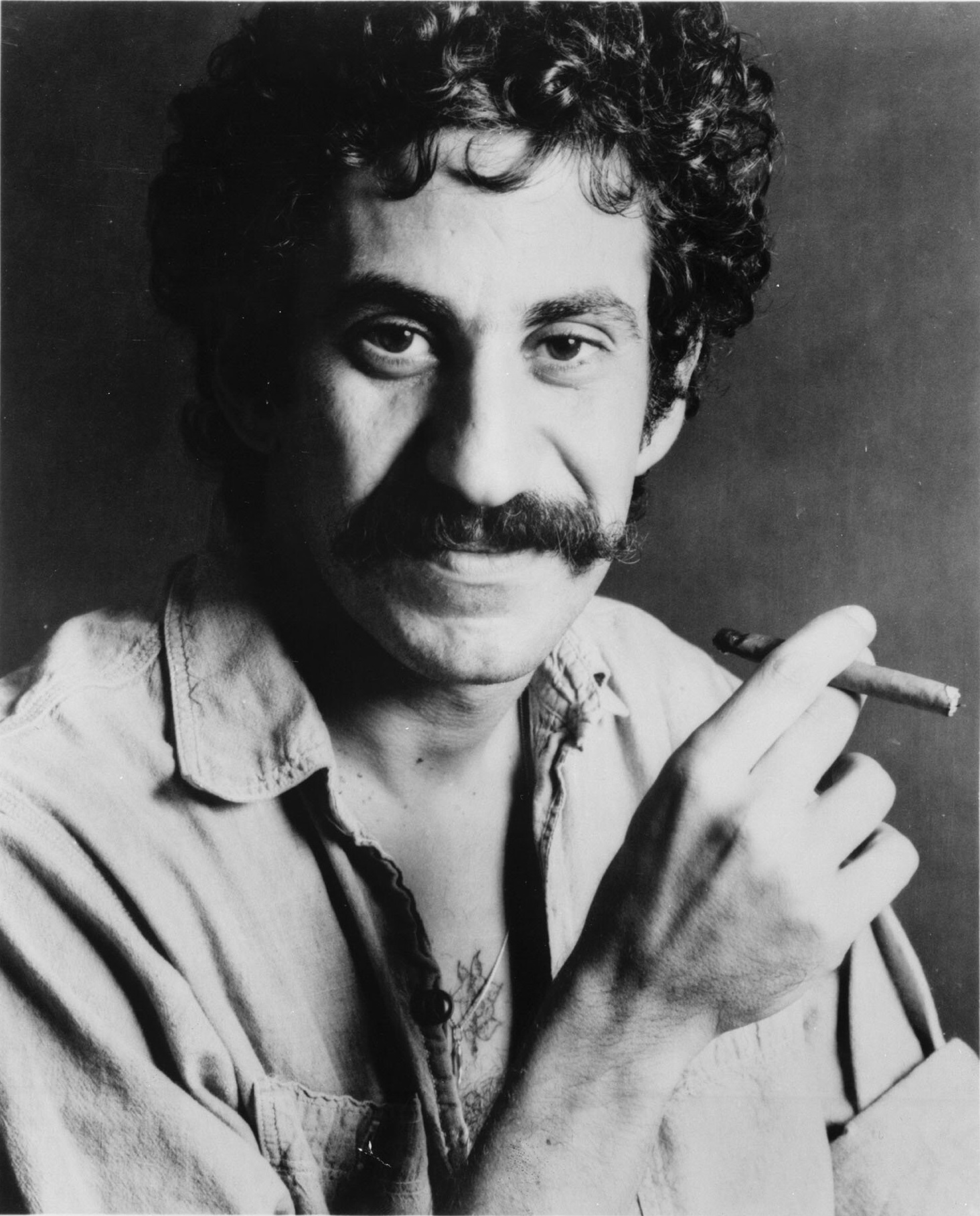
Jim Croce had two number ones in 1973. The second, "Time in a Bottle", was posthumous following his death in September.

The Billboard Hot 100 is a chart published since August 1958 by Billboard magazine which ranks the best-performing singles in the United States. In 1973, it was compiled based on a combination of sales and airplay data sourced from surveys of retail outlets and playlists submitted by radio stations respectively. During the year, 27 different singles spent time at number one, the most since 1966.

In the issue of Billboard dated January 6, Carly Simon reached number one with "You're So Vain", displacing the final number one of 1972, "Me and Mrs. Jones" by Billy Paul. It was the first chart-topper for Simon, who had made her Hot 100 debut as a teenager in 1964 as one half of the Simon Sisters. Elton John gained his first Hot 100 number one in February with "Crocodile Rock"; it was the first of six chart-toppers for the British singer in the 1970s, which contributed to him being ranked the top-performing act of the decade on the Hot 100. John ranks as one of the biggest-selling acts of all time and has won numerous awards and accolades, including multiple Grammy Awards and Academy Awards and membership of the Rock and Roll Hall of Fame. Another act that has been inducted into the Hall of Fame, the O'Jays, topped the Hot 100 for the first time in March with "Love Train". In April, Vicki Lawrence, one of the stars of television's The Carol Burnett Show, reached number one with "The Night the Lights Went Out in Georgia". It was her first Hot 100 entry, but, despite topping the listing at the first attempt, her singing success was short-lived and her only two other charting singles both missed the top 40.

Paul McCartney achieved his first chart-topper with the band Wings in June, with "My Love". After leaving the Beatles in 1970, he initially recorded primarily as a soloist and topped the Hot 100 with "Uncle Albert/Admiral Halsey" in collaboration with his wife Linda in 1971. He then formed the new band Wings; initially he did not receive separate credit on the band's releases, but "My Love" was the first Hot 100 entry to be credited to Paul McCartney and Wings. His fellow former member of the Beatles, Ringo Starr, gained his first solo chart-topper in December with "Photograph". Jim Croce reached number one for the first time in July with "Bad, Bad Leroy Brown"; two months later, he was killed when an airplane in which he was travelling while on tour crashed in Louisiana. Croce posthumously achieved a second number one when "Time in a Bottle" reached the top spot on the chart dated December 29. He was one of two acts with multiple chart-toppers in 1973, along with Stevie Wonder, who took "Superstition" and "You Are the Sunshine of My Life" to the top spot. The Edgar Winter Group, Maureen McGovern, Stories, Grand Funk, Gladys Knight & the Pips, and Charlie Rich also reached number one for the first time during 1973. Eddie Kendricks, who had achieved a number one as lead singer of the Temptations in 1969, earned his first number-one song since going solo in 1971. The year's longest-running number one was Roberta Flack's "Killing Me Softly with His Song", with five non-consecutive weeks in the top spot. Its initial run of four weeks atop the listing tied with "Tie a Yellow Ribbon Round the Ole Oak Tree" by Dawn featuring Tony Orlando and "My Love" by Paul McCartney and Wings for the year's longest unbroken run at number one.

== Chart history ==
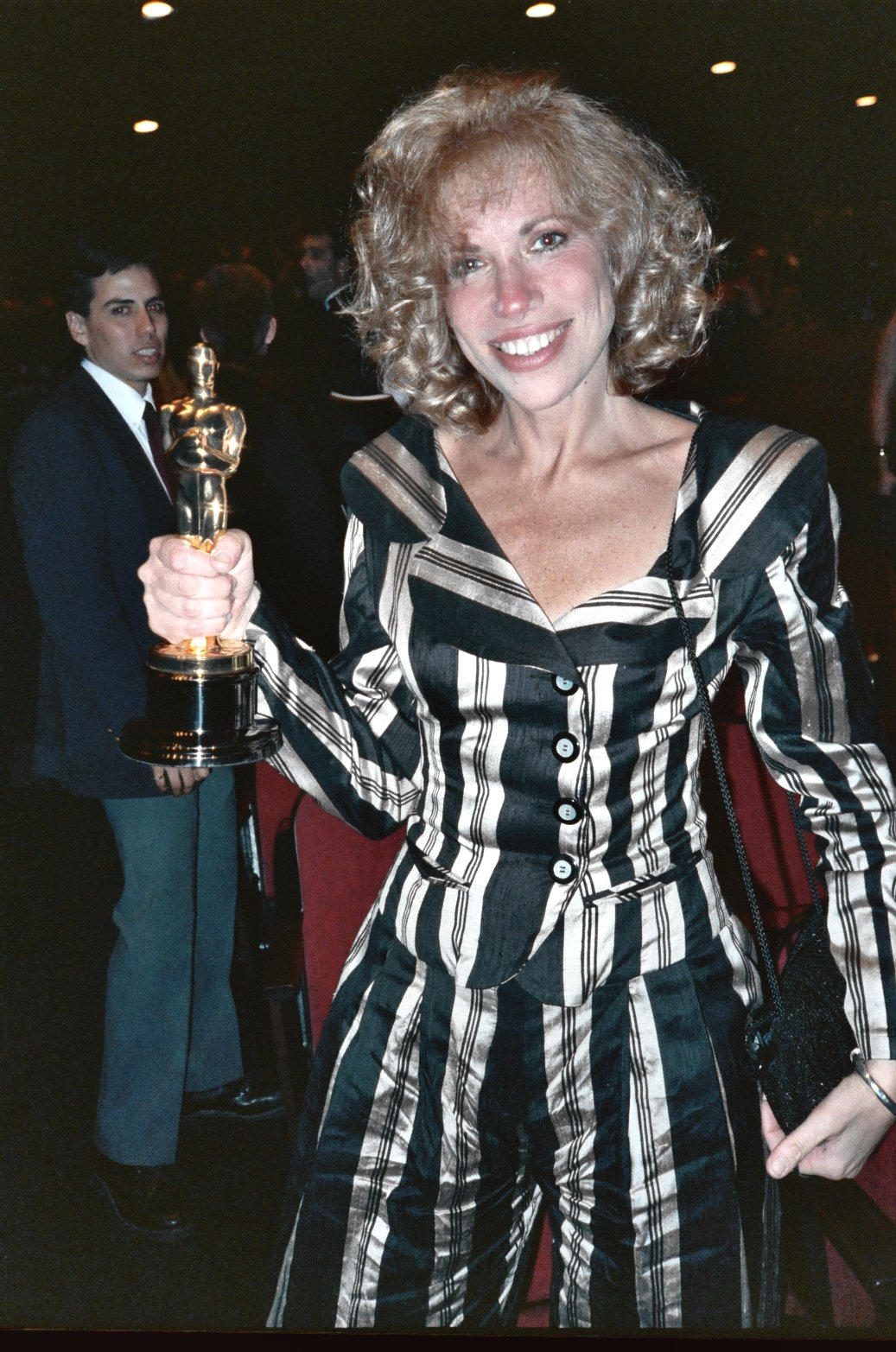
Carly Simon (pictured in 1989) had the year's first number one.

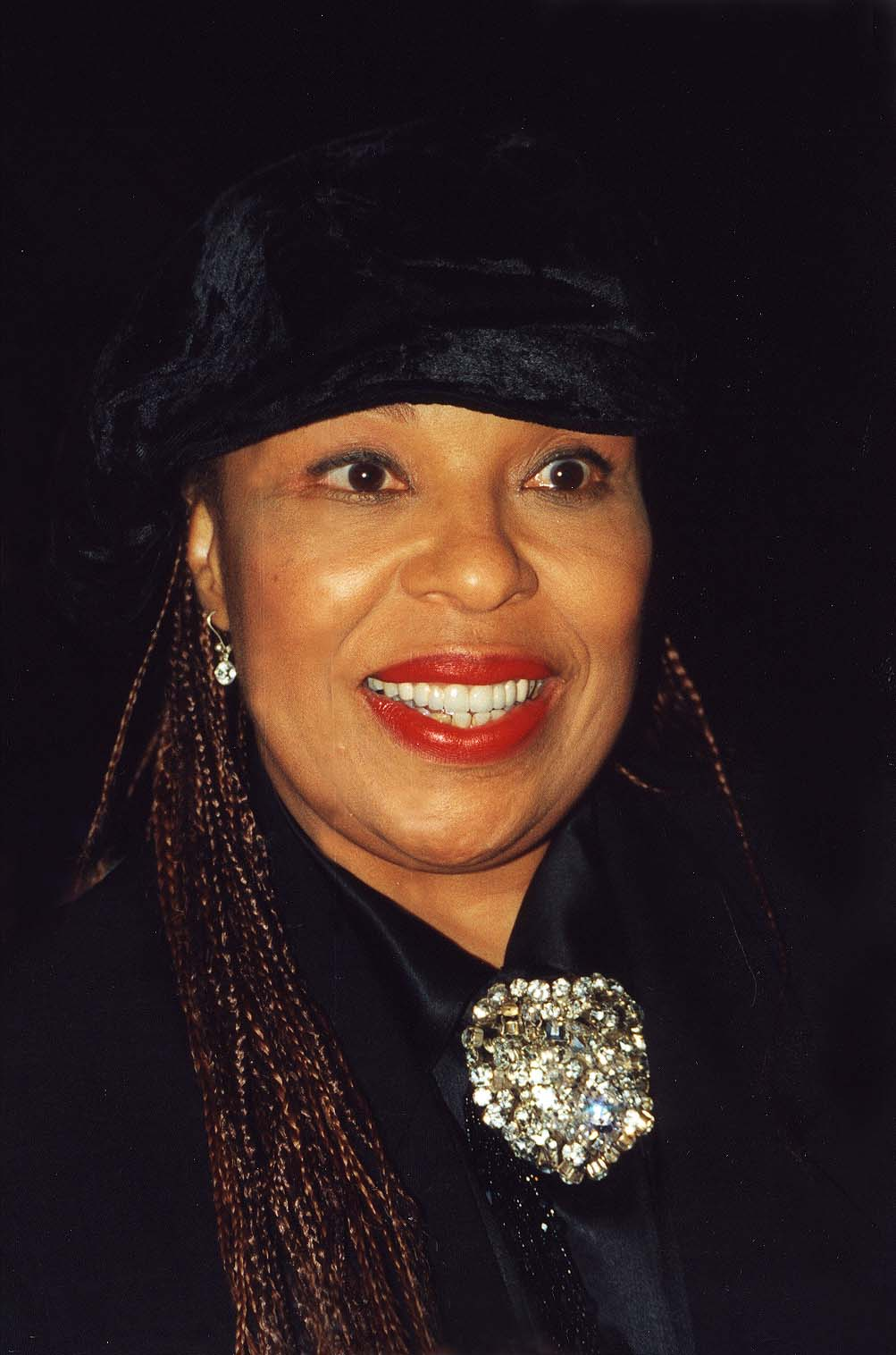
"Killing Me Softly with His Song" by Roberta Flack (pictured in 1995) spent five weeks at number one, the year's longest run in the top spot.

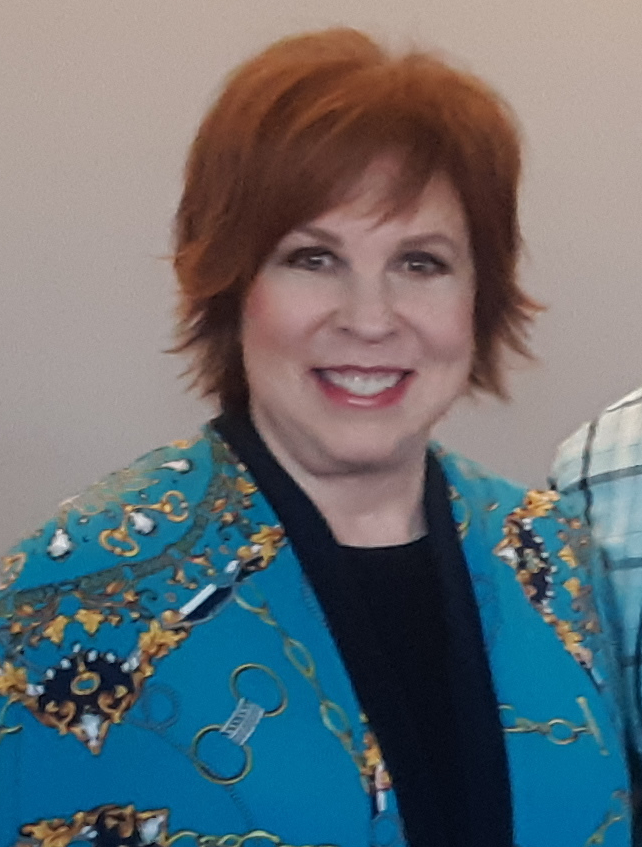
Vicki Lawrence (pictured in 2024) gained her only number one with "The Night the Lights Went Out in Georgia".

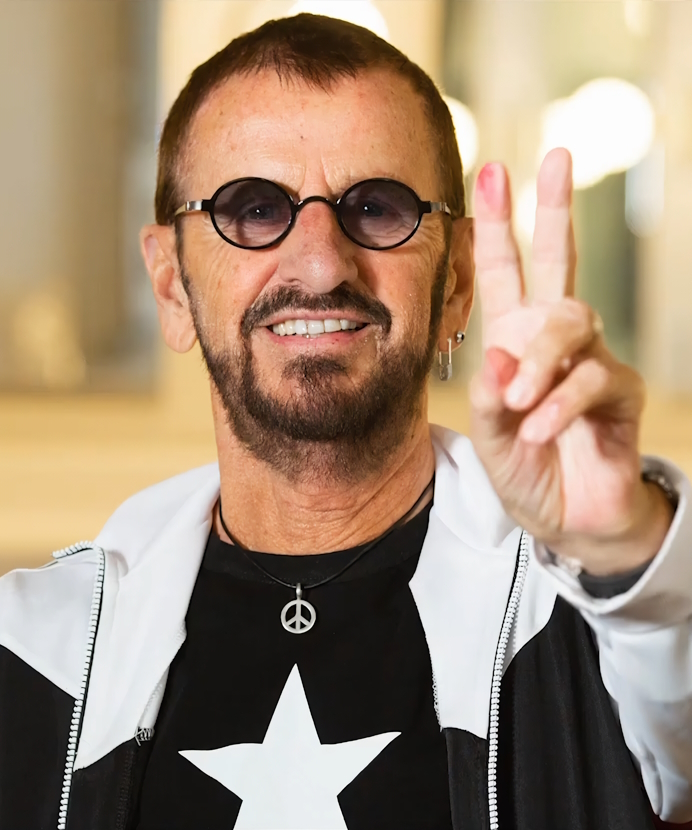
In 1973, Ringo Starr (pictured in 2019) achieved his first chart-topper since leaving the Beatles.

Chart history
No. (Note: The "No." column indicates the numerical sequence of number ones in Hot 100 history. "Re" indicates a single returning to number one.)	Issue date	Title	Artist(s)	Ref.
287	January 6	"You're So Vain"	Carly Simon	
287	January 13	"You're So Vain"	Carly Simon	
287	January 20	"You're So Vain"	Carly Simon	
288	January 27	"Superstition"	Stevie Wonder	
289	February 3	"Crocodile Rock"	Elton John	
289	February 10	"Crocodile Rock"	Elton John	
289	February 17	"Crocodile Rock"	Elton John	
290	February 24	"Killing Me Softly with His Song"	Roberta Flack	
290	March 3	"Killing Me Softly with His Song"	Roberta Flack	
290	March 10	"Killing Me Softly with His Song"	Roberta Flack	
290	March 17	"Killing Me Softly with His Song"	Roberta Flack	
291	March 24	"Love Train"	The O'Jays	
290 (re)	March 31	"Killing Me Softly with His Song"	Roberta Flack	
292	April 7	"The Night the Lights Went Out in Georgia"	Vicki Lawrence	
292	April 14	"The Night the Lights Went Out in Georgia"	Vicki Lawrence	
293	April 21	"Tie a Yellow Ribbon Round the Ole Oak Tree"	Dawn featuring Tony Orlando	
293	April 28	"Tie a Yellow Ribbon Round the Ole Oak Tree"	Dawn featuring Tony Orlando	
293	May 5	"Tie a Yellow Ribbon Round the Ole Oak Tree"	Dawn featuring Tony Orlando	
293	May 12	"Tie a Yellow Ribbon Round the Ole Oak Tree"	Dawn featuring Tony Orlando	
294	May 19	"You Are the Sunshine of My Life"	Stevie Wonder	
295	May 26	"Frankenstein"	The Edgar Winter Group	
296	June 2	"My Love"	Paul McCartney and Wings	
296	June 9	"My Love"	Paul McCartney and Wings	
296	June 16	"My Love"	Paul McCartney and Wings	
296	June 23	"My Love"	Paul McCartney and Wings	
297	June 30	"Give Me Love (Give Me Peace on Earth)"	George Harrison	
298	July 7	"Will It Go Round in Circles"	Billy Preston	
298	July 14	"Will It Go Round in Circles"	Billy Preston	
299	July 21	"Bad, Bad Leroy Brown"	Jim Croce	
299	July 28	"Bad, Bad Leroy Brown"	Jim Croce	
300	August 4	"The Morning After"	Maureen McGovern	
300	August 11	"The Morning After"	Maureen McGovern	
301	August 18	"Touch Me in the Morning"	Diana Ross	
302	August 25	"Brother Louie"	Stories	
302	September 1	"Brother Louie"	Stories	
303	September 8	"Let's Get It On"	Marvin Gaye	
304	September 15	"Delta Dawn"	Helen Reddy	
303 (re)	September 22	"Let's Get It On"	Marvin Gaye	
305	September 29	"We're an American Band"	Grand Funk	
306	October 6	"Half-Breed"	Cher	
306	October 13	"Half-Breed"	Cher	
307	October 20	"Angie"	The Rolling Stones	
308	October 27	"Midnight Train to Georgia"	Gladys Knight & the Pips	
308	November 3	"Midnight Train to Georgia"	Gladys Knight & the Pips	
309	November 10	"Keep on Truckin'"	Eddie Kendricks	
309	November 17	"Keep on Truckin'"	Eddie Kendricks	
310	November 24	"Photograph"	Ringo Starr	
311	December 1	"Top of the World"	The Carpenters	
311	December 8	"Top of the World"	The Carpenters	
312	December 15	"The Most Beautiful Girl"	Charlie Rich	
312	December 22	"The Most Beautiful Girl"	Charlie Rich	
313	December 29	"Time in a Bottle"	Jim Croce	

== Number-one artists ==
List of number-one artists by total weeks at number one
Weeks at No. 1	Artist
5	Roberta Flack
4	Dawn featuring Tony Orlando
4	Paul McCartney and Wings
3	Carly Simon
3	Elton John
3	Jim Croce
2	Vicki Lawrence
2	Stevie Wonder
2	Billy Preston
2	Maureen McGovern
2	Stories
2	Marvin Gaye
2	Cher
2	Gladys Knight & the Pips
2	Eddie Kendricks
2	The Carpenters
2	Charlie Rich
1	The O'Jays
1	The Edgar Winter Group
1	George Harrison
1	Diana Ross
1	Helen Reddy
1	Grand Funk
1	The Rolling Stones
1	Ringo Starr

== See also ==
- 1973 in music
- Lists of Billboard number-one singles
- List of Cash Box Top 100 number-one singles of 1973
- List of Billboard Hot 100 number-one singles of the 1970s
