= Why Can't We Live Together =

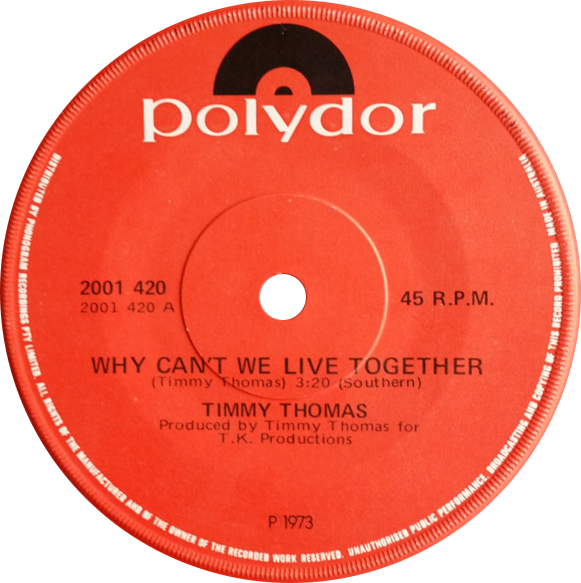
- Side A of Australian single

Single by Timmy Thomas

from the album Why Can't We Live Together
- B-side: "Funky Me"
- Released: August 1972
- Genre: Soul; progressive soul; R&B
- Length: 3:24 (single version); 4:50 (album version)
- Label: Glades/TK
- Songwriter: Timothy Thomas
- Producer: Timmy Thomas

Timmy Thomas singles chronology
"Why Can't We Live Together" (1972)	"People Are Changin'" (1973)

Alternative release
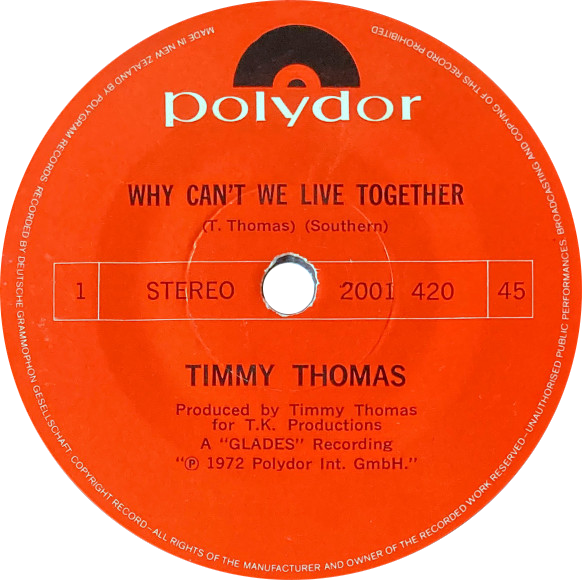
- Side A of New Zealand single

"Why Can't We Live Together" is a song written and recorded by Timmy Thomas in 1972. A chart hit in the following year, it was included on the album Why Can't We Live Together and was one of the first major hits to feature a rhythm machine.

== Background ==
Thomas wrote the song after moving to Miami, Florida, and hearing Walter Cronkite on the radio reporting on the number of deaths in the Vietnam War. In a later interview, he commented:

I said "WHAT?! You mean that many mothers' children died today? In a war that we can't come to the table and sit down and talk about this, without so many families losing their loved ones?" I said, "Why can't we live together?" Bing! That light went off. And I started writing it then. "No more wars, we want peace in this world, and no matter what color, you're still my brother." And then after that, put it on this little tape, and went to WEBF, which was a local radio station. And they played local artists then... they played it, and the phones lit up. They said "Man, who is that?" And I did it as a one-man band! That was my foot playing bass, that was my left-hand playing guitar... Could never believe that as a one-man band, something like that would've been played that much. But I do believe that the world was ready to start changing a little bit. And that song made the change.

The song is notable for being recorded in mono; its sparse, stripped-down production, features a Lowrey organ, bossa nova-style percussion from an early rhythm machine, and Thomas's passionate, soulful vocal. Thomas recorded a demo at Bobby Dukoff Recording Studios in North Miami, Florida, with Bill Borkan as sound engineer. The single version got more airplay because the longer instrumental coda was considered by many radio stations to be closer to jazz.

TK Records staff producer Steve Alaimo listened to the demo of the song and was going to re-cut it with a full band, but then decided the song was already finished the way it was.

== Chart performance ==
Released as a single in late 1972, the song became a major hit in the U.S. during the early part of 1973, reaching number one on the R&B chart, number three on the Billboard Hot 100, and eventually selling over two million copies. The song became his only hit single. It was also a hit in Canada at #6, in the UK peaking at #12, and number 25 in Australia. There was a re-release on 7" and 12" in 1979, with a live version as the B-side on the 7" European release.

== Later recorded versions ==
The song has been covered by many artists, including:

- Jamaican singer Tinga Stewart (1977)
- Mike Anthony (1982)
- Kongas (1982)
- Sade (1984, on their debut album Diamond Life, and in 1985 live on the Live Aid concert)
- Joan Osborne (2002, on her album How Sweet It Is)
- Maria Muldaur (2009).
- MC Hammer re-interpreted the song on his 1991 album Too Legit to Quit. In 1990, a "Stand Up For Love" re-recording of the song was done by Thomas.
- Santana on Live at Montreux plays the cover of "Why Can't We Live Together" (1996 & 2004).
- Lucky Peterson covered the song in the album Lucky Peterson, 1999.
- Steve Winwood covered the song on About Time in 2003.
- Nickodemus with Osiris and Petra Philipson covered the song on the 2009 compilation Turntables on the Hudson Lunar New Year 4707.
- Dr. Lonnie Smith's 2021 album Breathe opens with a cover of the song featuring Iggy Pop on vocals.
- Ronnie Earl covered the song on Beyond The Blue Door in 2019.
- Maximum Joy, a British punk funk dub band, recorded their cover version of "Why Can't We Live Together" as their last single, produced by roots reggae and dub sound engineer, Dennis Bovell

== Samples ==
- Mike Anthony, an American DJ/producer based in Belgium at the time, recorded his discofied version of the song in early 1982 but while it had reached the Belgian and Dutch charts, he was sued by the owners of the original Timmy Thomas recording for using elements from the original recording. A judge ordered a re-recording of the song with all the original parts removed. This ruling marked one of the first court cases in which the use of original samples in new recordings played a role, as a precursor to the many court cases in the 1990s and 2000s.
- In 2015, Canadian rapper Drake released "Hotline Bling", which heavily samples the song.

== See also ==
- List of 1970s one-hit wonders in the United States
