= Holly & Ivy =

Studio album by Natalie Cole
- Released: October 4, 1994
- Recorded: April 1994
- Studios: Ocean Way Recording and Record Plant (Hollywood, California); Bill Schnee Studios (North Hollywood, California); O'Henry Sound Studios (Burbank, California)
- Genres: Christmas; gospel; R&B
- Length: 46:52
- Labels: Elektra; WEA
- Producers: Natalie Cole (exec.); Tommy LiPuma (also exec.); André Fischer; Michael Masser

Natalie Cole chronology
Take a Look (1993)	Holly & Ivy (1994)	Stardust (1996)

Singles from Holly & Ivy
- 1. "No More Blue Christmas'" Released: 1994

Holly & Ivy is a 1994 Christmas album and 16th overall studio album by American singer Natalie Cole. Released on October 4, 1994, by Elektra, it is Cole's first album featuring Christmas music and serves as a follow-up to Take a Look (1993). Cole co-produced the album with American music producer Tommy LiPuma, with whom she had worked on Unforgettable... with Love (1991). Holly & Ivy consists of 12 tracks, including 11 covers of Christmas standards and carols and one original song written by Gerry Goffin and Michael Masser. Cole promoted the album as non-traditional in interviews and live performances.

Upon release, critics gave generally positive reviews for Holly & Ivy, praising its composition and Cole's interpretations of the covered material. The album was certified gold by Recording Industry Association of America (RIAA) on March 20, 1996, for 500,000 sales shipments; it peaked at number 36 on the Billboard 200 chart. Holly & Ivy spawned one single "No More Blue Christmas". In support of the album, Cole filmed a television special, "Natalie Cole's Untraditional Traditional Christmas", at State University of New York Performing Arts Center in Purchase, New York; it premiered on WNET on December 7, 1994.

== Background and recording ==
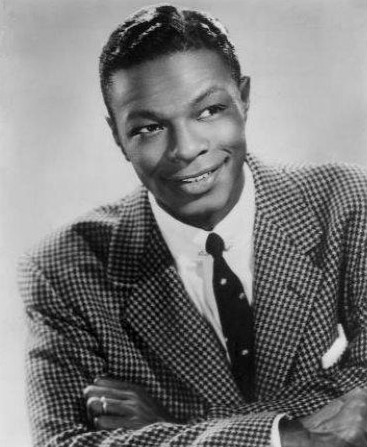
The album was inspired by her father Nat King Cole's album The Magic of Christmas (1960).

In an interview with Clarence Waldron from Jet, Natalie Cole said the idea of recording a Christmas album started from a telephone call from producer and longtime friend Michael Masser. Cole had previously worked with Masser on the song "Someone That I Used to Love" from her 1980 album Don't Look Back and her 1989 single "Miss You Like Crazy". Cole described the telephone call as unexpected; during their conversation, Masser told her: "I've got this beautiful Christmas song I wrote just for you." When they met, Messer played "No More Blue Christmas"; after the session, they both agreed to record a Christmas album; the songs were recorded and produced in April 1994. Cole expressed hope that the album would remind her fans about "the true spirit of the holiday season". She wanted it to communicate Christmas as "a time for families to reflect and not just wait until the holidays to be a family." Cole's sister Timolin Cole said: "Christmas Eve has always been a magical time with Natalie" when she could connect with family over holiday traditions.

One of the primary inspirations for Holly & Ivy came from her father's album The Magic of Christmas (1960). Cole called it one of "the nicest, warmest Christmas albums that I've heard", and described the original version of the 1945 track "The Christmas Song (Chestnuts Roasting on an Open Fire)" as "a darling sweet song" that has yet to be imitated by other original Christmas songs. In an interview with NPR, Cole said that: "it took 15 years into [her] career before [she] felt comfortable and confident enough to even attempt at singing my father's music." Holly & Ivy includes three cover version of Nat King Cole's songs: "Caroling, Caroling", "The First Noel", and "The Christmas Song (Chestnuts Roasting on an Open Fire)". They were each recorded as a tribute to him. Waldron said the album was "keeping the holiday spirit in the family". Cole would later re-record "The Christmas Song (Chestnuts Roasting on an Open Fire)" as a posthumous duet with her father on her 1999 Christmas album The Magic of Christmas. The song also appears on Cole's 2008 Christmas album (Caroling, Caroling: Christmas with Natalie Cole) and her 1995 collaborative Christmas live album with Plácido Domingo and José Carreras (A Celebration of Christmas).

== Composition ==
"Jingle Bells"
For her interpretation of "Jingle Bells", Cole said that she was inspired by 1940s music and The Andrews Sisters. She described her version as "very fun and up".

Holly & Ivy is a Christmas album influenced by R&B and gospel elements. Cole said she choose to explore other genres, explaining: "she just likes to expand a little, every now and then." Staying true to her soulful roots, the singer described Holly & Ivy as a "non traditional album" and said, "Though we do 'Silent Night', 'Merry Christmas Baby', and a wonderful gospel version of 'Joy to the World', (featuring L.A.'s Friendly Baptist Church choir) we move around a lot". In its biography of Cole, Billboard identified the album and the following 1996 album Stardust as "continu[ing] Cole's exploration of American pop standards".

The album's opening track is "Jingle Bells", which is reinvented with a "jazzy, sassy" sound. The second and third tracks are covers of Nat King Cole's "Caroling, Caroling" and "The First Noel" respectively. The fourth song is "No More Blue Christmas'"; Billboard called the song "a soulful, torch-like burner". "Christmas Medley" contains excerpts from "Jingle Bell Rock", "Winter Wonderland", "Little Drummer Boy", and "I'll Be Home for Christmas". A writer from Billboard picked out the "pure blues 'Merry Christmas Baby' " as a highlight of the album.

Clarence Waldron described Cole's interpretation of the seventh track, "Joy to the World", as "tak[ing] listeners to church on her gospel flavored rendition", while a writer from Billboard called it "rollicking". The eighth and ninth tracks are covers of Vera Lynn's "The Little Boy That Santa Claus Forgot" and Ida Zecco's "A Song for Christmas" respectively. The tenth track is a cover of "Silent Night". "The Christmas Song (Chestnuts Roasting on an Open Fire)" is the third and final cover of Nat King Cole on the album; David Browne of Entertainment Weekly felt that the decision to cover "The Christmas Song" with no vocals from her father benefited the song, which he said worked better "alone, not as a duet with the dead". The album concludes with the title track "Holly and Ivy", which Waldron called a "touching Christmas ballad" and described Cole's vocal performance as belonging to "one of the sweetest songbirds".

== Release and promotion ==
Holly & Ivy was first released by Elektra and the Warner Music Group on cassette and CD in the United States and Canada on October 25, 1994. It would later be made available as a digital download in both countries in 2010, sixteen years after its original release. Cole promoted the record by headlining a special edition of the Public Broadcasting Service (PBS) series Great Performances, titled "Natalie Cole's Untraditional Traditional Christmas"; the program was directed by Patricia Birch and was filmed at the State University of New York Performing Arts Center in Purchase, New York. Cole wore subdued clothing for her performances to match the album's "untraditional" quality. It featured special appearances by the New York Restoration Choir and Sesame Street character Elmo. The show premiered on WNET on December 7, 1994, and was later released on a VHS home video cassette that was distributed by Warner Music Vision. KCET-TV aired the program along with two other Christmas specials, "Perry Como's Irish Christmas" and "A Christmas Special With Luciano Pavarotti". It was Cole's first television special, and served as the album's primary promotional medium. "No More Blue Christmas'" was released as the lead single from the album, with Cole promoting it through a performance on the special.

The program received a lukewarm reception from critics. Chris Willman from the Los Angeles Times said the program's title was misleading because "it's hard to find anything the slightest bit untraditional about [it]". Willman commended the 1960s influence reminiscent of her father's Christmas songs and said the special was "a good-enough live video counterpart" to the album with an obvious inclusion of 'The Christmas Song' ". John J. O'Conner of The New York Times gave it a negative review, saying, "a couple of new songs are forgettable" and describing Cole's performance as "sweetly, and somewhat lifelessly", and the production as unable to leave a lasting impression on the viewers. O'Connor also said Cole's rendition of "The Christmas Song" was the highlight of the show and, "Ms. Cole once again dips in the repertory of her incomparable father". He compared the program to "Perry Como's Irish Christmas" and said both had "the same lulling level". Following Cole's death on December 31, 2015, PBS released a statement saying "we are grateful to have been able to capture [Cole's] extraordinary artistry for generations to come" through her Great Performances solo specials including her Christmas special.

== Critical reception ==
Professional ratings
Review scores
Source	Rating
AllMusic	3/5 stars
Cash Box	(favorable)
Entertainment Weekly	B

Critical response to Holly & Ivy was primarily positive upon its release. Clarence Waldron referred to it as a "top favorite among music lovers this season". Describing the album as a "fine outing", AllMusic's Robert Taylor praised Cole's choice of holiday classics and lesser known songs such as "The Little Boy That Santa Claus Forgot" and "No More Blue Christmas". David Browne of Entertainment Weekly commended the singer's ability to make "the usual yuletide tunes brassy and bustling", and highlighted her interpretation of 'Winter Wonderland' as sounding "like Christmas Eve at the Copa". He described Cole's voice as "warm and toasty" even when the material is lowered "from overly gushy arrangements". A Billboard's review, edited by Paul Verna, Marilyn A. Gillen, and Peter Cronin, described the album as the "rarest of Christmas albums: an elegant set with appeal that could outlast the season".

Holly & Ivy received some mixed reviews when compared to other Christmas albums. David Browne praised Cole's decision to stay away from traditionally Christmas images and sounds, instead "opt[ing] for a simple black evening dress on the cover" in comparison to Mariah Carey's Merry Christmas, released in the same year. While giving the album three stars out of five, Robert Taylor criticized it for "not hav[ing] the same 'classic' quality of her dad's 'The Christmas Album' ".

== Commercial performance ==
Holly & Ivy peaked on the Billboard 200 at number 36 and on Billboard's R&B Albums chart at number 20. It also reached at number 25 on Billboard's Catalog Albums chart on January 6, 1996. Holly & Ivy peaked on the U.S. Top Holiday Albums at number six, on February 27, 2013, roughly nineteen years after its release, becoming Cole's only Christmas album to appear on that chart. The album was certified gold by the Recording Industry Association of America (RIAA), denoting shipments of 500,000 copies.

== Track listing ==
- Writing and production credits for the songs are taken from the booklet of Holly & Ivy.

No.	Title	Writer(s)	Producer(s)	Length
1.	"Jingle Bells"	James Pierpont	Tommy LiPuma	3:34
2.	"Caroling, Caroling"	Alfred Burt; Wihla Hutson	LiPuma	3:08
3.	"The First Noel"	William Sandys	LiPuma	4:23
4.	"No More Blue Christmas'"	Gerry Goffin; Michael Masser	Masser	4:21
5.	"Christmas Medley: "Jingle Bell Rock" / "Winter Wonderland" / "Little Drummer Boy" / "I'll Be Home for Christmas"	Joseph Beal; Felix Bernard; James Booth; Katherine Davis; Walter Kent; Henry Onorati; Buck Ram; Harry Simeone; Dick Smith	André Fisher	6:08
6.	"Merry Christmas Baby"	Lou Baxter; Charles Brown; Johnny Moore	LiPuma	3:24
7.	"Joy to the World"	Baxter; Brown; Moore	Fisher	2:49
8.	"The Little Boy That Santa Claus Forgot"	Michael Carr; Tommie Connor; Jimmy Leach	Fisher	3:04
9.	"A Song for Christmas"	Carroll Coates	LiPuma	3:24
10.	"Silent Night"	Franz Xaver Gruber; Joseph Mohr	Fisher	5:02
11.	"The Christmas Song (Chestnuts Roasting On An Open Fire)"	Mel Tormé; Robert Wells	Fisher	3:38
12.	"The Holly and the Ivy"	Traditional	LiPuma	3:57
Total length:				46:52

== Personnel ==
Musicians

- Natalie Cole – vocals
- Terry Trotter – acoustic piano (1–3, 9, 10, 12)
- Robbie Buchanan – keyboards (4)
- Alan Broadbent – acoustic piano (5)
- Patrice Rushen – Fender Rhodes (5, 7, 8), Hammond B3 organ (7, 8), celeste (7, 8)
- Cedar Walton – acoustic piano (6)
- Charles Floyd – acoustic piano (7, 8)
- George Gaffney – acoustic piano (11)
- John Chiodini – guitars (1–3, 5, 7–9, 11, 12)
- Paul Jackson Jr. – guitars (4)
- Phil Upchurch – guitars (6), guitar solo (6)
- Jim Hughart – bass guitar (1–3, 5–12)
- Neil Stubenhaus – bass guitar (4, 5)
- Harold Jones – drums (1–3, 6, 9, 11)
- Mike Baird – drums (4)
- Jeff Hamilton – drums (5, 7, 8)
- Larry Bunker – percussion (1, 5–9, 12), drums (10)
- Brent Fischer – percussion (5, 10)

Music arrangements

- John Clayton Jr. – arrangements (1, 6, 9)
- Alan Broadbent – arrangements (2, 3, 8, 12), orchestral arrangements (7)
- Robbie Buchanan – rhythm and synth arrangements (4)
- Lee Holdridge – orchestral arrangements (4)
- André Fischer – arrangements (5)
- Jerry Peters – arrangements (5)
- Natalie Cole – chorale arrangements (7)
- Charles Floyd – chorale and rhythm arrangements (7)
- Clare Fischer – arrangements (10)
- Johnny Mandel – arrangements (11)

Children's choir on "Caroling, Caroling"

- Hillary Bonine, Josh Breslow, Rachel Brook, Blake Ewing, Jessica Frank, Megan Joyce, Janine Kamwiine-Colquhoun, Alma Llra, Majorie Mejia, Arielle Ramos, Niki Rosenfield, Zan Tansey, Alberto Vazquez and Jason Yun
- Richard P. Geere and Carole Keiser – choir directors

Choir on "Joy to the World"

- Catte Adams, Julie Delgado, Dorian Holley, Katrina Perkins, Sandy Simmons and Tony Warren

Choir on "Silent Night"

- Donna Davidson, Kevin Dorsey, Mary Hylan, Angie Jaree, Bob Joyce, David Joyce, Gary Jones, Gene Morford, Don Shelton, Sally Stevens, Terry Stilnell-Haraton and Jacke Ward-Smith

Production

- Natalie Cole – executive producer
- Tommy LiPuma – executive producer, producer (1–3, 6, 9, 12)
- Michael Masser – producer (4)
- André Fischer – producer (5, 7, 8, 10, 11)
- Al Schmitt – recording, mixing
- Les Cooper – additional recording
- Bob Loftus – additional recording, assistant engineer
- Dave Reitzas – additional recording
- Jeffrey "Woody" Woodruff – additional recording
- Noel Hazen – assistant engineer
- John Hendrickson – assistant engineer
- Richard Landers – assistant engineer
- Mike Rider – assistant engineer
- Al Sanders – assistant engineer
- Doug Sax – mastering at The Mastering Lab (Hollywood, California)
- Deborah Silverman-Kern – production assistant (1–3, 6, 9, 12)
- Patty Nichols – production coordinator (5, 7, 8, 10, 11)
- Shari Sutcliffe – project coordinator
- Keith Petrie – personal assistant to Natalie Cole and André Fischer
- Gabrielle Raumberger – art direction
- Frank Chi – design
- Dylan Tran – design
- Khrystal Jade Hopper – illustration
- Firooz Zahedi – photography
- Cecille Parker – wardrobe stylist
- Tara Posey – make-up
- Janet Zeitoun – hair stylist
- Dan Cleary – management

== Charts ==
Chart (1994)	Peak position
Australian Albums (ARIA)	127
US Billboard 200	36
US Catalog Albums (Billboard)	25
US Top Holiday Albums (Billboard)	6
US R&B Albums (Billboard)	20

== Certifications ==
Region	Certification	Certified units/sales
United States (RIAA)	Gold	500,000^{^}
^{^} Shipments figures based on certification alone.

== Release history ==
The follow release history was adapted from Amazon and AllMusic.

Country	Date	Format	Label
United States	Elektra, WEA	Digital download	2010
United States	Elektra, WEA	Audio CD	October 25, 1994
United States	Elektra, WEA	Cassette	October 25, 1994
Canada	Elektra, WEA	Digital download	2010
Canada	Elektra, WEA	Audio CD	October 25, 1994
Canada	Elektra, WEA	Cassette	October 25, 1994
