= Conversations with Warne Volume 2 =

Studio album by Pete Christlieb Quartet featuring Warne Marsh
- Released: 1991
- Recorded: September 15, 1978
- Studio: Jim Hughart's Studio, Granada Hills, CA
- Genre: Jazz
- Length: 60:45
- Label: Criss Cross Jazz; 1103
- Producer: Pete Christlieb

Warne Marsh chronology
Conversations with Warne Volume 1 (1978)	Conversations with Warne Volume 2 (1991)	How Deep, How High (1980)

Pete Christlieb chronology
Conversations with Warne Volume 1 (1978)	Conversations with Warne Volume 2 (1978)	Self Portrait (1978)

Conversations with Warne Volume 2 is an album by saxophonist Pete Christlieb's Quartet featuring Warne Marsh which was recorded in 1978 and released on the Dutch Criss Cross Jazz label in 1991.

== Reception ==
Professional ratings
Review scores
Source	Rating
Allmusic	4/5 stars

The Allmusic review states "tenors Pete Christlieb and Warne Marsh match wits, swing and ideas throughout nine runthroughs on "originals" based on common chord changes. ... Because Marsh and Christlieb had very different sounds but competitive natures, plenty of sparks flew during this date".

== Track listing ==
All compositions by Pete Christlieb and Jim Hughart

1. "No Tag" – 7:50
2. "Fishtale" – 5:34
3. "So What's Old" – 6:25
4. "You Drive!" – 8:14
5. "Nate and Dave" – 6:12
6. "Lunch" – 8:12
7. "Woody and You" – 6:06
8. "Bess, You Is My Man" – 6:53
9. "The April Samba" – 5:15

== Personnel ==
- Pete Christlieb, Warne Marsh – tenor saxophone
- Jim Hughart – bass
- Nick Ceroli – drums
