= Conversations with Warne Volume 1 =

Studio album by Pete Christlieb Quartet featuring Warne Marsh
- Released: 1991
- Recorded: September 15, 1978
- Studio: Jim Hughart's Studio, Granada Hills, CA
- Genre: Jazz
- Length: 51:39
- Label: Criss Cross Jazz; 1043
- Producer: Pete Christlieb

Warne Marsh chronology
Apogee (1978)	Conversations with Warne Volume 1 (1991)	Conversations with Warne Volume 2 (1978)

Pete Christlieb chronology
Apogee (1978)	Conversations with Warne Volume 1 (1978)	Conversations with Warne Volume 2 (1978)

Conversations with Warne Volume 1 is an album by saxophonist Pete Christlieb's Quartet featuring Warne Marsh which was recorded in 1978 and released on the Dutch Criss Cross Jazz label in 1991.

== Reception ==
Professional ratings
Review scores
Source	Rating
Allmusic	4/5 stars

The Allmusic review states "Christlieb, a powerful player himself, blends in well with Marsh and the results are both complementary and competitive. ... This stimulating music is easily recommended to fans of straight-ahead jazz and the Tristano school; Christlieb not only held his own with Marsh, but clearly inspired him".

== Track listing ==
All compositions by Pete Christlieb and Jim Hughart

1. "Lunch" – 8:29
2. "Fishtale" – 4:35
3. "Meat Balls" – 7:03
4. "Get Out!" – 6:38
5. "Weeping Willow" – 6:15
6. "India No Place" – 6:50
7. "You Drive!" – 7:20
8. "Woody and You" – 4:25

== Personnel ==
- Pete Christlieb, Warne Marsh – tenor saxophone
- Jim Hughart – bass
- Nick Ceroli – drums
