= John Moses =

John Moses may refer to:

- John Moses (Norwegian politician) (1781–1849), member of the Norwegian Constituent Assembly
- John Moses (Illinois politician) (1825–1898), Illinois judge and politician
- John Moses (North Dakota politician) (1885–1945), governor of North Dakota
- John Moses (baseball) (born 1957), American baseball player
- John Moses (priest) (1938–2024), English clergyman
- John A. Moses (1930–2024), Australian historian
- John J. Moses (born 1943), American clarinetist
