= Snowfall on the Sahara =

Studio album by Natalie Cole
- Released: June 22, 1999
- Studios: Right Track Recording and Flying Monkey (New York City, New York); Barking Doctor Recording (Mount Kisco, New York); Capitol Studios (Hollywood, California); The Embassy (North Hollywood, California); Chartmaker Studios (Malibu, California)
- Genres: Jazz; pop
- Length: 59:02
- Label: Elektra
- Producers: David Foster; Phil Ramone; Peter Wolf

Natalie Cole chronology
Stardust (1996)	Snowfall on the Sahara (1999)	The Magic of Christmas (1999)

Snowfall on the Sahara is a studio album by American singer Natalie Cole. It was released by Elektra Records on June 22, 1999, in the United States.

== Critical reception ==
Professional ratings
Review scores
Source	Rating
Allmusic	4/5 stars

AllMusic editor Stephen Thomas Erlewine found that "with Snowfall on the Sahara, [Cole] pulls back from her classic pop routine and she does so with style [...] Even with such clean radio-ready production, Snowfall on the Sahara is hardly a conventional adult contemporary record; it plays like a nightclub revue from a classic pop vocalist, only with modernized arrangements and songs. Such subtle deviations from formula results in a surprisingly satisfying record. By balancing the form of traditional pop with strong material and modernized production, Snowfall on the Sahara illustrates adult pop needs to be neither predictable or devoid of substantive songs."

== Track listing ==
Credits taken from the album's liner notes.

No.	Title	Writer(s)	Producer(s)	Length
1.	"A Song for You"	Leon Russell	Phil Ramone	4:16
2.	"Reverend Lee"	Gene McDaniels	Ramone	4:22
3.	"Snowfall on the Sahara"	Natalie Cole; Ina Wolf; Peter Wolf	P. Wolf; David Foster	4:22
4.	"More Than You'll Ever Know"	Michael Ruff	Ramone	4:40
5.	"Corinna"	Jesse Ed Davis; Taj Mahal	Ramone	5:13
6.	"Say You Love Me"	Dewayne Julius Rogers	Ramone	4:53
7.	"Everyday I Have the Blues"	Peter Chatman	Ramone	4:07
8.	"With My Eyes Wide Open I'm Dreaming"	Harry Revel; Mack Gordon	Foster	4:29
9.	"His Eyes, Her Eyes"	Alan Bergman; Marilyn Bergman; Michel Legrand	Ramone	5:57
10.	"Since You Asked"	Judy Collins	Ramone	3:58
11.	"Gotta Serve Somebody"	Bob Dylan	Ramone	5:17
12.	"Stay With Me"	George David Weiss; Jerry Ragovoy	Ramone	4:10

== Personnel ==
Information is based on AllMusic and the album's liner notes.

Vocalists

- Natalie Cole – vocals, backing vocals (2, 5, 6, 11), BGV arrangements (2, 5, 11)
- Diva Gray – backing vocals (2, 6, 11)
- Vaneese Thomas – backing vocals (2, 6, 11)
- Rob Mathes – backing vocals (5, 11), BGV arrangements (6)
- Phil Ramone – backing vocals (5)
- Robin Clark – backing vocals (6)
- Curtis King – backing vocals (6, 11)
- Fonzi Thornton – backing vocals (6)
- Darryl Tookes – backing vocals (6)
- Luther Vandross – backing vocals (6)
- James "D-Train" Williams – backing vocals (6)

Musicians

- Clifford Carter – Rhodes electric piano (1), Hammond B3 organ (2, 6, 7, 12)
- Terry Trotter – acoustic piano (1, 7, 9)
- Rob Mathes – keyboards (1, 5, 6, 12), programming (1, 2, 5, 6, 11, 12), electric guitar (1, 2, 5, 6, 12), Wurlitzer electric piano (2), acoustic piano (5), dobro (5)
- Jan Folkson – programming (1, 2, 5, 6, 11, 12)
- Charles Floyd – acoustic piano (2, 6)
- Peter Wolf – keyboards (3), bass guitar (3), drum programming (3)
- Rob Mounsey – keyboards (4, 10), electric piano (4, 9), programming (4, 10), additional keyboards (9), theremin (9)
- David Foster – keyboards (8)
- Simon Franglen – Synclavier programming (8)
- Michael Thompson – guitars (3, 8)
- Jeff Mironov – guitars (4, 7, 12), electric guitar (5, 10), slide guitar (5), acoustic guitar (10)
- John Chiodini – guitars (9)
- Will Lee – bass guitar (1, 2, 4–7, 11)
- Nathan East – bass guitar (3, 8)
- Jim Hughart – bass guitar (9)
- Tony Levin – bass guitar (10)
- Steve Gadd – drums (1, 2, 4–7, 10–12)
- Abe Laboriel Jr. – drum loops (2)
- Rodney Jerkins – drum programming (3)
- John Robinson – drums (8)
- Harold Jones – drums (9)
- Virgil Blackwell – clarinet (1)
- John J. Moses – clarinet (1)
- Ken Hitchcock – clarinet (10)
- Pamela Sklar – flute (1, 10)
- Louise de Tullio – flute (9)
- Diane Lesser – oboe (1)
- Shelly Woodworth – oboe (10)
- Kim Laskowski – bassoon (10)
- Lawrence Feldman – alto saxophone (2, 7)
- Lanny Morgan – alto saxophone (9), alto flute (9), flute (9)
- Don Shelton – alto saxophone (9), alto flute (9), flute (9)
- Ronnie Cuber – baritone saxophone (2, 7)
- Jack Nimitz – baritone saxophone (9), bass clarinet (9)
- Rick Depofi – tenor saxophone (2, 7)
- Dave Tofani – tenor saxophone (2, 7)
- Pete Christlieb – tenor saxophone (9), clarinet (9)
- Terry Harrington – tenor saxophone (9), clarinet (9)
- Bob Carlisie – French horn (1, 12)
- John Clark – French horn (1, 12)
- Chris Komer – French horn (1)
- Jeff Land – French horn (12)
- Dave Bargeron – bass trombone (2, 7), tenor trombone (2, 7)
- Jim Pugh – tenor trombone (2, 7, 12)
- Charles Loper – trombone (9)
- Bob McChesney – trombone (9)
- Bill Reichenbach Jr. – trombone (9)
- Phil Teele – trombone (9)
- Dave Taylor – bass trombone (12)
- Keith O'Quinn – tenor trombone (12)
- Jeff Kievit – trumpet (2, 7, 12)
- Dave Trigg – trumpet (2, 7, 9, 12)
- Charlie Davis – trumpet (9)
- Warren Leuning – trumpet (9)
- Carl Saunders – trumpet (9)
- Tony Kadleck – trumpet (12)
- Byron Stripling – trumpet (12)

String sections

- Rob Mathes – arrangements (1, 2, 5, 6, 11, 12), conductor (1, 2, 6, 12)
- Rob Mounsey – arrangements and conductor (4, 7)
- William Ross – string arrangements (8)
- Bob Krogstad – arrangements and conductor (9)
- Michel Legrand – composer (9)
- Carol Webb – concertmaster (1, 2, 4, 6, 12)
- Endre Granat – concertmaster (9)

Cello

- Diane Barere (1, 2, 4, 6, 10, 12)
- Richard Locker (1, 2, 4, 6, 10, 12)
- Jeanne LeBlanc (1, 2, 4, 6, 10, 12)
- Mark Shuman (1, 4, 12)
- Steve Erdody (9)
- Stefanie Fife (9)
- Tim Landauer (9)
- Cecilia Tsan (9)

Double and String basses

- Jacqui Danilow (1, 4)
- David Finck (1, 4, 12)
- Edward Meares (9)
- Frances Liu Wu (9)

Harp

- Stacy Shames (1, 4, 12)
- Gayle Levant (9)

Viola

- Carol Landon (1, 2, 4, 6, 10, 12)
- Sue Pray (1, 2, 4, 6, 10, 12)
- Crystal Garner (1, 4)
- Juliet Haffner (1, 4)
- Maryhelen Ewing (2, 6)
- Rick Gerding (9)
- Mimi Granat (9)
- Andrew Picken (9)
- Evan Wilson (9)
- Sheila Browne (12)
- Nardo Poy (12)

Violin

- Abe Appleman (1, 2, 4, 6, 12)
- Avril Brown (1, 4, 12)
- Barry Finclair (1, 2, 4, 6, 12)
- Joyce Hammann (1, 2, 4, 6)
- Regis Iandiorio (1, 4, 12)
- Ann Leathers (1, 2, 4, 6)
- Jan Mullen (1, 2, 4, 6, 12)
- Paul Peabody (1, 2, 4, 6, 12)
- Richard Sortomme (1, 2, 4, 6, 12)
- Marti Sweet (1, 2, 4, 6, 12)
- Donna Tecco (1, 2, 4, 6, 12)
- Murray Adler (9)
- Eun-Mee Ahn (9)
- Michael Ferril (9)
- Tiffany Yi Hu (9)
- Ovsep "Joe" Ketendjian (9)
- Gary Kuo (9)
- Isabella Lippi (9)
- Sara Parkins (9)
- Rafael Rishik (9)
- Bob Sanov (9)
- Jean Sudbury (9)
- Kimiyo Takeya (9)
- Jennifer Walton (9)
- Timothy Baker (12)
- Cecilia Hobbs-Gardner (12)
- Elizabeth Lim (12)

== Production ==
- Natalie Cole – executive producer
- Phil Ramone – executive producer, producer (1, 2, 4–7, 9–12)
- David Foster – producer (3, 8)
- Peter Wolf – producer (3)
- Jill Dell'Abate – production manager, music contractor
- Alli Truch – art direction, design
- Michel Comte – photography
- Joanna Jacovini – stylist
- Peter Savic – hair
- Tara Posey – make-up
- Dan Cleary Management Associates – management

Technical credits

- Ted Jensen – mastering at Sterling Sound (New York, NY)
- Eric Schilling – recording (1, 2, 4–7, 9–12), mixing (1, 2, 4–7, 12)
- Felipe Elgueta – recording (3, 8)
- Paul Erickson – recording (3)
- Brad Gilderman – recording (3)
- Mick Guzauski – mixing (3, 8)
- Frank Filipetti – mixing (7, 9–11)
- Al Schmitt – recording (8)
- Jason Stasium – assistant engineer (1, 2, 4–7, 9–12), mix assistant (1, 2, 4–7, 12)
- Pete Karam – mix assistant (1, 2, 4–7, 12)
- Tom Bender – mix assistant (3, 8)

== Charts ==
Chart (1999)	Peak position
US Billboard 200	163
US Top R&B/Hip-Hop Albums (Billboard)	64
