= Io tu noi tutti =

Studio album by Lucio Battisti
- Released: March 1977
- Genre: Pop, disco
- Length: 41:24
- Label: Numero Uno
- Producer: Lucio Battisti, Bones Howe

Lucio Battisti chronology
Lucio Battisti, la batteria, il contrabbasso, eccetera (1976)	Io tu noi tutti (1977)	Images (1977)

Professional ratings
Review scores
Source	Rating
Ondarock	6/10 stars

Amarsi un po'
Amarsi un po' was the most sold single of 1977 in Italy

Sì, viaggiare
Sì, viaggiare, B-side from the single

Questione di cellule
Questione di cellule, track #6

Io tu noi tutti (Me, you, all of us) is the eleventh studio album by the Italian singer and songwriter Lucio Battisti. It was released in March 1977 by Numero Uno.

Recorded in Hollywood, the album was Italy's second best selling album in 1977.

== Track listing ==
All lyrics written by Mogol, all music composed by Lucio Battisti.

1. "Amarsi un po'" (To Feel in Love) – 5:07
2. "L'interprete di un film" (Star in a Film) – 4:28
3. "Soli" (Lonely) – 4:18
4. "Ami ancora Elisa" (You're Still in Love with Elisa) – 6:41
5. "Sì, viaggiare" (Keep on Cruising) – 6:07
6. "Questione di cellule" (Matter of Cells) – 4:16
7. "Ho un anno di più" (The Only Thing I've Lost) – 5:04
8. "Neanche un minuto di 'non amore'" (There's Never Been a Moment) – 5:20

== Personnel ==
- Guitar: Lucio Battisti, Dennis Budimir, Danny Ferguson, Ray Parker Jr.
- Bass: Scotty Edwards, Jim Hughart
- Keyboards: Michael Boddicker, Mike Melvoin
- Drums: Hal Blaine, Ed Greene

== Charts ==
Chart (1977)	Peak position
Italy (Musica e dischi)	1

Chart (2019)	Peak position
Italy (FIMI)	56
