= Jimmy Leach (songwriter) =

- Born: 6 November 1905; Stockport, Cheshire, England
- Occupations: Composer; Lyricist; Organist

Jimmy Leach (6 November 1905 – 1975) was a British organist, popular music composer and lyricist, best remembered for the song "The Little Boy that Santa Claus Forgot", which he co-wrote with Michael Carr and Tommie Connor. He established himself as a composer of light pieces which came to be included in the repertoires of, notably, the BBC Scottish Variety and BBC Midland Light Orchestras.
