= Luconi =

Luconi is a surname. Notable people with the surname include:

- Alberto Luconi (1893–1984), Italian-American clarinetist
- Patrizia Luconi (born 1970), Italian gymnast
