= The Magic of Christmas (Natalie Cole album) =

Studio album by Natalie Cole and London Symphony Orchestra
- Released: October 19, 1999
- Recorded: 1998–99
- Studios: Abbey Road Studios (London, UK)
- Genres: Christmas; vocal
- Length: 41:11
- Label: Elektra
- Producer: Fred Salem

Natalie Cole chronology
Snowfall on the Sahara (1999)	The Magic of Christmas (1999)	Ask a Woman Who Knows (2002)

The Magic of Christmas is a collaborative Christmas album by American recording artist Natalie Cole and London Symphony Orchestra, released on September 21, 1999, by Elektra Records. The album is a follow-up to Snowfall on the Sahara. It reached peak positions of number 157 on the US Billboard 200 and number 84 on Billboard's Top R&B/Hip-Hop Albums chart. A number of the tracks on The Magic of Christmas were first released on the 1998 album Christmas With You, which was produced exclusively for Hallmark Cards.

== Critical reception ==
Professional ratings
Review scores
Source	Rating
AllMusic	2.5/5 stars

AllMusic's Heather Phares awarded the album 2.5 out of 5 stars and described the collection of songs as "traditional yet sophisticated". She also highlighted "O Tannenbaum", "The 12 Days of Christmas", and "The Christmas Song".

== Track listing ==
All tracks producer by Fred Salem.

No.	Title	Writer(s)	Length
1.	"The Christmas Song" (duet with Nat King Cole)	Mel Tormé; Robert Wells	3:45
2.	"Hark! The Herald Angels Sing"	Felix Mendelssohn, W. H. Cummings (Adaptation)	3:43
3.	"O Tannenbaum"	Traditional	3:57
4.	"Sweet Little Jesus Boy"	Robert MacGimsey	3:43
5.	"Sleigh Ride"	Leroy Anderson (Music); Mitchell Parish (Lyrics)	3:31
6.	"My Grown-Up Christmas List"	David Foster; Linda Thompson-Jenner	4:11
7.	"The Christmas Waltz"	Jule Styne; Sammy Cahn	4:23
8.	"Mary, Did You Know?"	Buddy Greene; Mark Lowry	3:26
9.	"Carol of the Bells"	Mykola Leontovych; Peter J. Wilhousky	4:34
10.	"Twelve Days of Christmas"	Traditional	6:04

Note

- "The Christmas Song" uses samples from a recording of "The Christmas Song", as performed by Nat King Cole.

== Personnel ==
Adapted from album booklet.

- Natalie Cole – vocals
- London Symphony Orchestra – orchestra (strings, horns, woodwinds, percussion)
- Terry Trotter – grand piano
- Christopher Argent – organ (1–4, 7)
- Jim Hughart – bass
- Bob Krogstad – musical arrangements (1–3, 5–8, 10), orchestra conductor
- Robert MacGimsey – musical arrangements (4)
- Peter Wilhousky – musical arrangements (9)
- Nat King Cole – vocals (1)

== Production ==
- Dick Carter – executive producer
- Fred Salem – producer
- Toby Foster – recording, mixing (5, 6, 8–10)
- Al Schmitt – mixing
- Doug Sax – mastering at The Mastering Lab (Hollywood, California)
- Alli Truch – art direction, design
- David Jensen – photography
- Cecille Parker – stylist
- Tara Posey – make-up
- Janet Zeitoun – hair stylist

== Charts ==
Chart (1999–2000)	Peak position
US Billboard 200	157
US Top Holiday Albums (Billboard)	21
US Top R&B/Hip-Hop Albums (Billboard)	84
