= Be Like the Kettle and Sing =

Song
- Songwriter(s): Tommie Connor; Walter Ridley; Desmond O'Connor
- Composer(s): Tommie Connor; Walter Ridley; Desmond O'Connor

"Be Like the Kettle and Sing" is a popular song composed and written by Tommie Connor, Walter Ridley and Desmond O'Connor. It was first performed by Vera Lynn in the 1943 film We'll Meet Again.

Vera Lynn recorded the song for Decca Records (catalog No. F8254) in the UK on 16 December 1942 with Mantovani & His Orchestra.

== See also ==
- 1943 in music
- 1943 in British music
