= Michael Carr =

Michael or Mike Carr may refer to:

- Michael Carr (composer) (1905–1968), British composer
- Michael Carr (cricketer) (1933–1995), English cricketer
- Michael Carr (English footballer) (born 1983), currently playing for Stalybridge Celtic
- Michael Carr (Gaelic footballer), played for Donegal
- Michael Carr (Labour politician) (1947–1990), British politician, MP for Bootle in 1990
- Michael Carr (Liberal Democrat politician) (born 1946), British politician, MP for Ribble Valley 1991–92
- Mike Carr (game designer) (born 1951), American fantasy writer and game designer
- Mike Carr (musician) (1937–2017), English jazz organist, pianist and vibraphonist
- Mike Carr (ice hockey) (born 1959), ice hockey player
- Michael Carr, presenter of Faces of Death
