= Apogee (Pete Christlieb and Warne Marsh album) =

Studio album by Pete Christlieb and Warne Marsh
- Released: 1978
- Recorded: May 17–21 and June 3, 1978
- Studio: ABC, Los Angeles, California
- Genre: Jazz
- Length: 42:28
- Label: Warner Bros. BSK 3236
- Producer: Walter Becker, Donald Fagen

Warne Marsh chronology
Warne Out (1977)	Apogee (1978)	Conversations with Warne Volume 1 (1978)

Pete Christlieb chronology
Tell It Like It Is (1972)	Apogee (1978)	Conversations with Warne Volume 1 (1978)

Apogee is an album by saxophonists Pete Christlieb and Warne Marsh, recorded in 1978 and released on the Warner Bros. label.

== Reception ==
Professional ratings
Review scores
Source	Rating
AllMusic	4/5 stars
DownBeat	5/5 stars
Jazz Review	5/5 stars
The Penguin Guide to Jazz Recordings	3/4 stars
The Rolling Stone Jazz Record Guide	4/5 stars

The Rolling Stone Jazz Record Guide states that "Apogee is an unadulterated burner, guaranteed to work for tenor freaks." The AllMusic review noted: "Apogee is an anomaly in many ways. First, it is a Southern California answer to the great titan tenor battle records of the '40s and '50s. Rather than sounding like a cutting contest, it sounds like a gorgeous exercise in swinging harmony and melodic improvisation by two compadres. ... the pair engaged a kind of freewheeling, good-time set that remains one of the most harmonically sophisticated recordings to come out of the 1970s." On All About Jazz, Chris M. Slawecki observed: "It is impossible to distinguish one man’s tenor from the other: sometimes they swing in unison, sometimes harmonizing, sometimes in duet or counterpunching, but they are always strong, meaty and powerful."

In Jazz Review, Mark Keresman called it "a sterling set of beautifully recorded, searing, straight-ahead, mainstream bop tenor madness." DownBeat reviewer Douglas Clark wrote, "Watch out when you slip this record out of its sleeve. It’s hot enough to burn your fingers... There’s fire on every cut... I recommend this album highly, but don’t blame me if it melts your stylus".

== Track listing ==
1. "Magna-tism" (Pete Christlieb) – 7:32
2. "317 E. 32nd" (Lennie Tristano) – 6:34
3. "Rapunzel" (Donald Fagen, Walter Becker) – 7:15
4. "Tenors of the Time" (Joe Roccisano) – 7:42
5. "Donna Lee" (Charlie Parker) – 6:35
6. "I'm Old Fashioned" (Jerome Kern, Johnny Mercer) – 6:50
7. "Lunarcy" (Lou Levy) – 7:13 Bonus track on CD reissue
8. "Love Me" – 4:13 Bonus track on CD reissue
9. "How About You?" (Burton Lane, Ralph Freed) – 9:37 Bonus track on CD reissue

== Personnel ==
- Pete Christlieb, Warne Marsh – tenor saxophone
- Lou Levy – piano
- Jim Hughart – bass
- Nick Ceroli – drums
- Joe Roccisano – arranger (tracks 1–4)
