= Natalie Cole en Español =

Studio album by Natalie Cole
- Released: June 25, 2013
- Studio: Beach House Recording Studios (Miami Beach, Florida); Noisematch Estudios (Miami, Florida); No Excuses Studios (Santa Monica, California); JLG Studio (Santo Domingo, Dominican Republic)
- Genre: Latin ballads
- Length: 43:55
- Label: Verve
- Producer: Rudy Pérez; David Foster; Humberto Gatica; Tony Renis; Juan Luis Guerra

Natalie Cole chronology
Caroling, Caroling: Christmas with Natalie Cole (2008)	Natalie Cole en Español (2013)

Natalie Cole en Español is the final studio album by Natalie Cole, released on June 25, 2013, through Verve Records. Produced by the Cuban American composer Rudy Pérez, it is her first and only Spanish album and her first record released following her kidney transplant in 2009. The album is a follow-up to her third Christmas album Caroling, Caroling: Christmas with Natalie Cole. Natalie Cole en Español consists of twelve tracks, which are cover versions of Spanish standards. The album features duets with Juan Luis Guerra, Chris Botti, Arthur Hanlon, Andrea Bocelli and a posthumous duet with her father Nat King Cole.

== Background ==
One of the really cool things that Rudy said to me was, 'I'm not looking for you to become Spanish or Latin. I need you to still be Natalie Cole.'

—Cole talking to Los Angeles Times about the recording process for the album

Cole had expressed interest in recording a Spanish album for nearly a decade but her label Capitol rejected her pitch and told her "the timing wasn't right". David Foster, with whom she had previously worked with on Unforgettable... with Love (1991), encouraged to attempt to record the album again. Cole cited Salvadoran nurse Esther as one of the primary influences for the recording of the album. Cole received a kidney transplant from Esther's niece in 2009 and referred to her connection with the nurse as causing her to be "drawn even more to Latin people, Latin programs". She added her connection to the Salvadoran family led her to "feel like [she's] part Latino now" and "(made) the desire to make this record become even stronger".

Weary of comparisons to her father's 1958 Spanish album Cole Español, Cole described her album as "not [being] a tribute to my father as much as it is a tribute to Latin music because of my father". During the recording of the album, Pérez served as Cole's language coach. Cole said "Black people and Hispanic people have the same kind of feel for passion, for music, for fun, for heart." She expressed a love for language by listing "I love French ... I love Portuguese, I love Italiano[,]" but emphasized that "for [her] right now is Español".

In the recording sessions, Pérez translated the lyrics into English to allow Cole to capture the emotions of the songs. Cole recalled on the first days of recording that she cried as "the translation of these Spanish lyrics is like poetry." When listening to the album, she found that "[she] liked [her]self singing in Spanish". She compared the recording process to that of Unforgettable... with Love as it allowed her to step out of her comfort zone to create what she viewed as art.

== Reception ==
=== Critical response ===
Professional ratings
Review scores
Source	Rating
AllMusic	2.5/5 stars
JazzTimes	(favorable)

Natalie Cole en Español received generally favorable reviews from music critics. Andy Kellman of AllMusic described the album as not being "a mere throwback to a brief phase in Nat's career". Kellman called it "a likable diversion from her norm" and commended her for using zest to make up for her lack of fluency. JazzTimes' Christopher Loudon commended Cole's "deeper emotional connection to the lyrics" in comparison to her father's Spanish albums. Loudon praised the album as "all slickly grand-scale, yet it works satisfyingly well". Soultracks' Justin Kantor wrote that the album is "a polished set largely comprised of baladas romanticas with sweeping orchestration and spicy, yet decidedly controlled, vocal performances". Kantor found certain songs required "a tad more rhythmic creativity and free-spirited singing", but recommended the overall product to her fans.

== Track listing ==
No.	Title	Writer(s)	Length
1.	"Frenesí"	Alberto Borras Domínguez	3:24
2.	"Voy A Apagar La Luz / Contigo Aprendí (Medley)"	Armando Manzanero	4:06
3.	""Acércate Más (Come Closer to Me)"" (featuring Nat King Cole)	Osvaldo Farrés	2:46
4.	"Mañana De Carnaval"	Luiz Bonfá; Antônio Maria	3:08
5.	"Bésame Mucho" (featuring Andrea Bocelli)	Consuelo Velázquez	4:02
6.	"Quizás, Quizás, Quizás"	Osvaldo Farrés	2:27
7.	"Solamente Una Vez"	Agustín Lara	2:30
8.	"Oye Como Va (Medley)" (featuring Arthur Hanlon)	Tito Puente; Bobby Collazo; Pablo Beltrán Ruiz; Rudy Pérez; David E. Brown; José Areas; Jose Rico Reyes	4:59
9.	"Yo Lo Amo (And I Love Him)" (featuring Chris Botti)	Lennon/McCartney	4:25
10.	"El Día Que Me Quieras"	Carlos Gardel; Alfredo Le Pera	4:28
11.	"Bachata Rosa" (featuring Juan Luis Guerra)	Juan Luis Guerra	4:02
12.	"Amapola"	Joseph Maria Lacalle	3:20
Total length:			43:55

iTunes bonus track
No.	Title	Writer(s)	Length
13.	"Cuando Vuelva a Tu Lado" (featuring Arturo Sandoval)	Stanley Adams; María Grever	3:37
Total length:			47:32

== Personnel ==
Vocalists

- Natalie Cole – vocals
- Nat King Cole – sampled vocals (3)
- Andrea Bocelli – vocals (5)
- Casey Cole – backing vocals (8)
- Timolin Cole – backing vocals (8)
- Ana Cristina – backing vocals (8)
- Rudy Pérez – backing vocals (8)
- Juan Luis Guerra – vocals (11), chorus (11)
- Janina Rosado – chorus (11)

Musicians

- Rudy Pérez – keyboards (1–4, 6–10, 12), arrangements (1–10, 12), acoustic piano (2–4, 6, 8–10), rhythm track arrangements (2, 4, 10)
- Clay Perry – acoustic piano (1, 6, 7, 12)
- Jochem van der Saag – programming and sound design (5)
- Arthur Hanlon – acoustic piano (8)
- Juan Vicente Zambrano – acoustic piano (8), keyboards (8), arrangements (8)
- Janina Rosado – acoustic piano (11), synthesizer programming (11)
- Rene Toledo – nylon guitar (1, 12), guitars (2)
- Brian Monroney – guitars (1–4, 6–10, 12), arrangements (12)
- Juan Luis Guerra – guitars (11), arrangements (11)
- Ramón Stagnaro – acoustic nylon guitar (11)
- Julio Hernandez – bass (1, 2, 4, 6, 9, 10, 12)
- Chuck Bergeron – upright bass (3, 7)
- Abednego DeLos Santos – bass (11)
- Orlando Hernandez – drums (1–4, 6, 7, 9, 10)
- Eduardo Rodriguez – percussion (1–4, 6–10)
- Juan De La Cruz – bongos (11), maracas (11)
- Isidro Bobadilla – chimes (11)
- Gary Keller – alto saxophone (1, 6–9)
- Mike Brignola – baritone saxophone (1, 6–9)
- Ed Calle – tenor saxophone (1, 3, 6–9)
- Nadine Asin – flute (4, 7)
- Paul Green – clarinet (7)
- John Kricker – trombone (1, 6–9)
- Francisco Dimus – flugelhorn (1, 6–9), trumpet (1, 6–9)
- Jim Hacker – trumpet (1, 6–9)
- Chris Botti – trumpet solo (9)
- Victor Mitrov – trumpet (11)
- Miami Symphonic Studio Orchestra (1–4, 6–12)
- Alfredo Oliva – orchestra contractor (1–4, 6–12)
- Glenn Basham – concertmaster (1–4, 6–12)
- Gary Lindsay – arrangements (1–10, 12)
- David Foster – arrangements (5)
- William Ross – string arrangements (5)

String section (Track 11)

- Georgina Betancourt and Milena Zigkovic – cello
- Alberto Iznaga and Anaris Iznaga – viola
- Priscilla Gomez, Giorni Liriano, Guillermo Mota, Beckyrene Perez and Rosanna Rosario – violin

== Production ==
- Jay Landers – A&R
- Rudy Pérez – producer (1–4, 6–10, 12), vocal producer (5), co-producer (11), director
- David Foster – producer (5)
- Humberto Gatica – producer (5)
- Tony Renis – co-producer (5)
- Juan Luis Guerra – producer (11)
- Daniela Socorro – A&R coordinator
- Evelyn Morgan – A&R administrator
- Christine Telleck – release coordinator
- Vartan Kurjian –
- Todd Gallopo – art direction
- T.J. River – art direction, design
- Shari Hyun – design
- Jack Guy – photography
- V. Bradley – fashion stylist
- Imani Cohen – fashion styling assistant
- Tami Orloff – stylist
- Robert Cavali – clothing
- J. Mandel – clothing
- Louis Verdad – clothing
- Janet Zeitoun – hair stylist
- Saisha Beecham – make-up
- Barbara Rose Entertainment – management

Technical credits

- Vlado Meller – mastering at Masterdisk (New York City, New York)
- Andres Bermudez – recording
- Bruce Weeden – recording, mixing
- Rudy Pérez – vocal recording for Natalie Cole (5)
- David Lopez – additional recording, assistant engineer
- Jorge Vivo – additional recording
- Alexander Campos – assistant engineer
- Kyle Vandekerkhoff – assistant engineer

== Charts and certifications ==
=== Weekly charts ===
Chart (2013)	Peak position
Australian Albums (ARIA)	162
Croatian International Albums (HDU)	37
Polish Albums (ZPAV)	21
US Billboard 200	91
US Top Jazz Albums (Billboard)	2
US Latin Pop Albums (Billboard)	1
US Top Latin Albums (Billboard)	1

=== Certifications ===
Region	Certification	Certified units/sales
Poland (ZPAV)	Gold	10,000^{*}
^{*} Sales figures based on certification alone.
