= Still Unforgettable =

Studio album by Natalie Cole
- Released: September 9, 2008
- Recorded: 2007–2008
- Studios: Capitol Studios (Hollywood, California)
- Genre: Jazz
- Label: DMI/Atco
- Producers: Natalie Cole; Gail Deadrick; Tena Clark (exec.)

Natalie Cole chronology
Leavin' (2006)	Still Unforgettable (2008)	Caroling, Caroling: Christmas with Natalie Cole (2008)

Professional ratings
Review scores
Source	Rating
AllMusic	3/5 stars
The Patriot Ledger	(average)

Still Unforgettable is a 2008 studio recording by American singer Natalie Cole, recognized as the Best Traditional Pop Vocal Album at the 51st Grammy Awards.

== Background ==
Speaking in July 2008 to noted UK soul writer Pete Lewis of the award-winning Blues & Soul, Cole discussed the thinking behind 'Still Unforgettable': "While we were still trying to create that same 'Unforgettable'-type mood or environment, this time I wanted to expand. Rather than just doing another Nat 'King' Cole tribute – which was not necessary – I wanted to go deeper into the American Songbook, by not just getting songs from my father, but also from other singers of his time like Frank Sinatra, Lena Horne, Sammy Davis Jr. and Peggy Lee. You know, there was something about the approach that the writers from that era had to the lyrics and the melodies that was so intentional, so purposeful. Which I think is the thing that's missing from music today."

== Track listing ==
Unless otherwise noted, information is based on the album's liner notes

No.	Title	Writer(s)	Length
1.	"Walkin' My Baby Back Home" (Duet with Nat King Cole)	Fred E. Ahlert; Roy Turk	2:59
2.	"Come Rain or Come Shine"	Harold Arlen; Johnny Mercer	3:08
3.	"Coffee Time"	Arthur Freed; Harry Warren	2:28
4.	"Somewhere Along the Way"	Kurt Adams; Sammy Gallop	4:42
5.	"You Go to My Head"	J. Fred Coots; Haven Gillespie	5:24
6.	"Nice 'N' Easy"	Alan Bergman; Marilyn Bergman; Lew Spence	3:31
7.	"Why Don't You Do Right?"	Joe McCoy	4:02
8.	"Here's That Rainy Day"	Jimmy Van Heusen; Johnny Burke	6:03
9.	"But Beautiful"	Van Heusen; Burke	3:51
10.	"Lollipops and Roses"	Tony Velona	5:52
11.	"The Best Is Yet to Come"	Cy Coleman; Carolyn Leigh	4:04
12.	"Something's Gotta Give"	Mercer	2:49
13.	"Until the Real Thing Comes Along"	Sammy Cahn; Saul Chaplin; Alberta Nichols; Mann Holiner; L.E. Freeman	3:09
14.	"It's All Right with Me"	Cole Porter	3:29

Borders Exclusive Bonus Tracks
No.	Title	Writer(s)	Length
15.	"All the Things You Are"	Jerome Kern; Oscar Hammerstein II	3:06
16.	"Bésame Mucho"	Consuelo Velazquez; Sunny Skylar	5:08

Amazon.com Exclusive Bonus Track
No.	Title	Writer(s)	Length
15.	"How Do You Keep the Music Playing"	Michel Legrand; Alan and Marilyn Bergman	5:54

Japan Bonus Tracks
No.	Title	Writer(s)	Length
15.	"All the Things You Are"	Kern; Hammerstein II	3:06
16.	"Bésame Mucho"	Velazquez; Skylar	5:08
17.	"Busted"	Harlan Howard	3:57
18.	"How Do You Keep the Music Playing"	Michel Legrand; Alan and Marilyn Bergman	5:54
19.	"The Man That Got Away"	Harold Arlen; George Gershwin	3:45

Expanded Digital Edition
No.	Title	Writer(s)	Length
15.	"All the Things You Are"	Kern; Hammerstein II	3:06
16.	"The Man That Got Away"	Arlen; Gershwin	3:45
17.	"Summer Sun"	Chad Cates; Dave Barnes; Matt Wertz	4:00
18.	"Bésame Mucho"	Velazquez; Skylar	5:08
19.	"Willow Weep for Me"	Ann Ronell	5:39
20.	"Busted"	Howard	3:57
21.	"How Do You Keep the Music Playing?"	Legrand; Bergman; Bergman	5:54

Note

- Nat King Cole's original version of "Walkin' My Baby Back Home" was recorded on September 4, 1951.

== Personnel ==
=== Musicians ===
- Natalie Cole – vocals
- Nat King Cole – sampled vocals (1)
- Terry Trotter – acoustic piano (1, 2, 6, 7, 10–12, 14)
- Tamir Hendelman – acoustic piano (3, 4, 13)
- Alan Broadbent – acoustic piano (5, 9)
- Tom Ranier – celesta (5, 10, 13)
- John Chiodini – guitars (1, 5–7, 9–14)
- Jim Hughart – bass guitar (1, 2, 5–12)
- Reggie Hamilton – bass guitar (3, 14)
- Chuck Berghofer – bass guitar (4, 13)
- Harold Jones – drums (1, 2, 5–12)
- Jeff Hamilton – drums (3)
- Gregg Field – drums (4, 13)
- Lewis Nash – drums (14)
- Vanessa Brown – percussion, triangle (7)
- Pete Christlieb – tenor saxophone solo (7, 12)
- Charles Loper – trombone (7)
- Andy Martin – trombone (7)
- Rick Baptist – trumpet (7)
- Warren Luening – trumpet (7), trumpet solo (8)

=== Orchestra ===
- Bill Hughes – contractor
- Yvonne Richardson – librarian
- Bill Hughes, Joe McGuire, Chris Walden and Terry Woodson – copyists

Horns, Reeds and Woodwinds

- Pete Christlieb, Gene Cipriano, Jeff Clayton, Gary Foster, Jennifer Hall, Dan Higgins and Sal Lozano – saxophones
- Gary Foster, Sal Lozano, Sheridon Stokes and Jim Walker – woodwinds
- Rose Corrigan – bassoon
- Tom Ranier – clarinet
- Tom Boyd – English horn, oboe
- Craig Gosnell, Alan Kaplan, Charles Loper, Andy Martin, Bruce Otto and Dave Ryan – trombone
- Rick Baptist, Wayne Bergeron, Gilbert Castellanos, Daniel Fornero, Warren Luening and Carl Saunders – trumpet
- Steven Becknell, Nathan Campbell, David Duke, Brian O'Connor and James Thatcher – French horn

Strings

- Endre Granat – concertmaster
- Trey Henry, Edward Meares, Mike Valerio and Frances Liu Wu – bass
- Larry Corbett, Dennis Karmazyn, Timothy Loo, David Low, Miguel Martinez and Cecilia Tsan – cello
- Katie Kirkpatrick – harp
- Karen Elaine, Matt Funes, Pamela Goldsmith, Darrin McCann and Jorge Moraga – viola
- Charlie Bisharat, Mark Cargill, Lily Ho Chen, Kevin Connolly, Mario DeLeon, Joel Derouin, Bruce Dukov, Endre Granat, Songa Lee, Natalie Leggett, Phillip Levy, Liane Mautner, Helen Nightengale, Sid Page, Alyssa Park, Sara Parkins, Bob Peterson, Katia Popov, Lesa Terry and Shalini Vijayan – violin

=== Arrangements ===
- Bill Holman – arrangements (1, 12)
- Jim Hughart – arrangements (3, 7)
- Alan Broadbent – arrangements (5, 6, 9)
- Nan Schwartz – arrangements (8, 10)
- Patrick Williams – arrangements (13)
- Harold Wheeler – arrangements (14)

== Production ==
- Tena Clark – executive producer
- Natalie Cole – producer, liner notes
- Gail Deadrick – co-producer, musical director
- Al Schmitt – recording, mixing
- Bill Schnee – additional recording on rhythm tracks (5, 7, 13, 14) at Bill Schnee Studios (North Hollywood, California)
- Steve Genewick – additional vocal engineer, Pro Tools editing
- Travis Ference – assistant engineer
- Darius Fong – assistant engineer
- Aaron Walk – assistant engineer
- Doug Sax – mastering at The Mastering Lab (Hollywood, California)
- Ivy Skoff – production coordinator
- Ken Batchelor – A&R
- Debbie Meister – A&R coordinator
- Pete Fletcher – product manager
- Diana Barnes – art direction, design
- Matthew Rolston – photography
- Janet Zeitoun – hair
- Fran Cooper – make-up
- Cecilia Parker – stylist
- V. Bradley – wardrobe assistant
- Moir/Borman Entertainment – management

== Charts ==
=== Weekly charts ===
Chart (2008)	Peak position
UK Albums (Official Charts)	59
US Billboard 200	19
US Top R&B/Hip-Hop Albums (Billboard)	8
US Top Jazz Albums (Billboard)	1
