= Warne Out =

Studio album by Warne Marsh
- Released: 1977
- Recorded: May 14–15 and June 5, 1977
- Studio: Model A Studio, Granada Hills, CA
- Genre: Jazz
- Length: 32:51
- Label: Interplay (IP-7709)
- Producer: Toshiya Taenaka

Warne Marsh chronology
Crosscurrents (1977)	Warne Out (1977)	Apogee (1978)

Warne Out is an album by saxophonist Warne Marsh recorded in 1977 and released on the Interplay label.

== Reception ==
Professional ratings
Review scores
Source	Rating
Allmusic	4/5 stars

Allmusic called it, "An album where wit and inventiveness are the theme, from the title to the leads".

== Track listing ==
All compositions by Warne Marsh except where noted.

1. "Loco 47" – 4:02
2. "Liner Notes" – 5:05
3. "Warne Out" – 3:45
4. "Lennie's Pennies" (Lennie Tristano) – 4:05
5. "Duet" – 4:32
6. "Ballad" – 6:20
7. "Warne Piece" – 5:02

== Personnel ==
- Warne Marsh – tenor saxophone
- Jim Hughart – bass
- Nick Ceroli – drums
