= Caroling, Caroling: Christmas with Natalie Cole =

Studio album by Natalie Cole
- Released: 2008
- Genre: Christmas
- Length: 29:53
- Label: Elektra
- Producer: André Fischer; Tommy LiPuma; Fred Salem

Natalie Cole chronology
Still Unforgettable (2008)	Caroling, Caroling: Christmas with Natalie Cole (2008)	Natalie Cole en Español (2013)

Caroling, Caroling: Christmas with Natalie Cole is an album by Natalie Cole that was released by Elektra in 2008. It is a compilation of tracks from her previous holiday albums. It is her last holiday album and final English-language studio album.

== Track listing ==
No.	Title	Writer(s)	Producer(s)	Length
1.	"The Christmas Song" (duet with Nat "King" Cole with the London Symphony Orchestra)	Mel Tormé; Robert Wells	Fred Salem	3:29
2.	"O Tannenbaum" (with the London Symphony Orchestra)	Traditional	Salem	3:58
3.	"The Little Boy that Santa Claus Forgot"	Michael Carr; Tommie Connor; Jimmy Leach	André Fisher	3:05
4.	"Hark the Herald Angels Sing" (with the London Symphony Orchestra)	Traditional	Salem	3:43
5.	"Caroling, Caroling"	Alfred Burt; Wihla Hutson	Tommy LiPuma	3:09
6.	"The First Noel"	Traditional	LiPuma	4:23
7.	"Joy to the World"	Traditional	Fischer	2:50
8.	"Silent Night"	Traditional	Fischer	5:02
Total length:				29:53

=== Charts ===
Chart (2008)	Peak position
US Top Jazz Albums (Billboard)	11
