= Alberto Luconi =

Italian-American clarinetist and instructor

Alberto (Albert) Luconi was an Italian-American clarinetist and instructor.

== Early life and education ==
Luconi was born January 23, 1893, in Valmontone, Italy, a municipality of Rome about 23 miles southeast of the city. He studied clarinet under Aurélio Magnani at the Royal Academy of Saint Cecilia in Rome where he earned a Master's degree (Diploma di Magistero) in 1919 and was one of three recipients of the Prize of the Province of Rome.

== Career and later life ==
In Italy, Luconi performed as first clarinetist with the Augusteum and the LaScala-Toscanini orchestras. In 1920, Arturo Toscanini (notably meticulous in the choice of his orchestral musicians), invited Luconi to join the LaScala orchestra for its tour of the United States and Canada. The orchestra was composed of 98 musicians, including four clarinets: Alfio Alfieri, Luigi Cancellieri, Francesco Sigimoni, and Alberto Luconi. While on tour, Luconi was heard by the manager of the Detroit Symphony Orchestra who extended an offer to join the ensemble.

Luconi returned to the United States in 1922, petitioned for naturalization, and took up residence in Detroit, Michigan. From 1923 to 1926 he played principal clarinet with the Detroit Symphony Orchestra under Ossip Gabrilowitsch where Luconi was known for his solo performances. He left the orchestra in 1927 to devote more time to solo and chamber performance. Subsequently, he went on to perform with the Manhattan Opera Company (New York), the WJR Radio Station Orchestra (Detroit), the Jim Handy Recording Studios (Detroit), the Fox Theatre Orchestra (soloist) and The Chamber Music Society of Detroit. Alberto taught briefly at Wayne State University and he supervised Michigan's W.P.A. Project in Lansing, Michigan. He served as both vice-president and acting president of the Detroit Federation of Musicians before becoming president in October 1934, a position he held until 1940.

In 1943, Luconi joined the faculty of the University of Michigan as a visiting instructor of clarinet. He became an Instructor in 1946, promoted to assistant professor in 1952, associate professor of clarinet in 1960, and would continue to teach there until 1963 when he retired as an associate professor emeritus. While at the university he performed often as a founding member of the University Woodwind Quintet, and he made appearances with the Stanley Quartet. Upon retirement the university commended his "superior artistry," and of his teaching said, "In his service at the University, Mr. Luconi went far beyond the call of duty, selflessly nurturing the individual careers of each on[e] [sic] of his students."

Luconi also taught students locally at the Teal School of Music in Detroit, founded by saxophonist Larry Teal. Of Luconi Teal said, "He was a teacher who had the ability to make his students want to achieve."

On March 20, 1956, Luconi performed clarinet for the premier of Samuel Barber’s Summer Music at the Detroit Institute of Arts. The performance was notable for several reasons. First, the Chamber Music Society of Detroit which commissioned the piece in celebration of its 10th anniversary, had paid for the commission with contributions from its subscribers. The Detroit News claimed, "It was the first time in the history of music that a major work had been commissioned on a public subscription basis." Second, the piece was performed twice during the program, first after intermission and again at the concert's finale. Finally, the piece was performed by "first-desk" members of the Detroit Symphony: James Pellerite, flute; Arno Mariotti, oboe; Alberto Luconi, clarinet; Charles Sirard, bassoon; and Ray Alonge, French horn; rather than the New York Woodwind Quintet with whom Barber had rehearsed and refined the piece.

The clarinetists James Morton, John J. Moses, Fred Ormand, and David Weber were all students of Luconi.

Alberto Luconi married Allene Shadowen (American b. in Kentucky) in 1933. They had no children. Upon retirement from the University of Michigan Luconi returned to Valmontone, Italy with Allene. Allene died in December 1975.

== Death and legacy ==
Luconi died on September 13, 1984, at the age of 91. He is interred in the municipal Cemetery of Valmontone, province of Rome Italy.

Luconi is considered part of the "Italian clarinet school" distinguished by teacher Aurèlio Magnani's "smooth and homogenous sound" and unified in the first part of the twentieth century. Luconi and others "exported Magnani’s teaching style to the United States" where they were "very appreciated as teachers and orchestra players."

In 1985 the Alumni Society of the University of Michigan School of Music honored Luconi posthumously with a Citation of Merit:

In recognition of his international reputation as a soloist with leading orchestras and opera companies. His distinguished career brought great distinction to the University of Michigan during his 21 years as professor of clarinet. He brought to his teaching the same perfection, supreme technical skills and musical insights that made him world famous as a performer. His friendly personality, high standards, broad experience and expertise set an invaluable and lasting example for his students and colleagues.
