= Stardust (Natalie Cole album) =

Studio album by Natalie Cole
- Released: September 24, 1996
- Recorded: June–September 1996
- Studios: Ocean Way Recording, Capitol Studios, Conway Studios and LeGonks West (Hollywood, California); Schnee Studios (North Hollywood, California); Record Plant (Los Angeles, California); Chartmaker Studios (Malibu, California); The Hit Factory and Sony Music Studios (New York City, New York); The Shire (Bedford, New York); Wisseloord Studios (Hilversum, Netherlands)
- Genre: Traditional pop
- Length: 78:30
- Label: Elektra
- Producers: George Duke; David Foster; Phil Ramone; Natalie Cole (also exec.)

Natalie Cole chronology
Holly & Ivy (1994)	Stardust (1996)	Snowfall on the Sahara (1999)

Professional ratings
Review scores
Source	Rating
AllMusic	2.5/5 stars
Billboard	(favorable)
Cash Box	(favorable)
Entertainment Weekly	B−

Stardust is a studio album by American singer Natalie Cole, released on September 24, 1996. Cole won the Grammy Award for Best Pop Collaboration with Vocals for the song "When I Fall in Love", a duet with Nat King Cole, at the 39th Grammy Awards.

The song also won the Grammy Award for Best Instrumental Arrangement with Accompanying Vocal(s) for arrangers Alan Broadbent and David Foster. The album was nominated for Best Traditional Pop Vocal Performance.

== Track listing ==
Unless otherwise noted, Information is based on the album's Liner Notes

No.	Title	Writer(s)	Producer(s)	Length
1.	"There's a Lull in My Life"	Mack Gordon; Harry Revel	Phil Ramone	5:22
2.	"Stardust"	Hoagy Carmichael; Mitchell Parish	David Foster	4:40
3.	"Let's Face the Music and Dance"	Irving Berlin	Ramone	2:16
4.	"Teach Me Tonight"	Sammy Cahn; Gene de Paul	George Duke	3:16
5.	"When I Fall in Love" (duet with Nat King Cole)	Edward Heyman; Victor Young	Foster	4:12
6.	"What a Diff'rence a Day Made"	Stanley Adams; María Méndez Grever	Ramone	3:16
7.	"Love Letters"	Heyman; Young	Duke	4:49
8.	"He Was Too Good to Me"	Lorenz Hart; Richard Rodgers	Ramone	5:07
9.	"Dindi" (Portuguese)	Ray Gilbert; Antônio Carlos Jobim	Ramone	4:36
10.	"Two for the Blues"	Neal Hefti; Jon Hendricks	Duke	4:22
11.	"If Love Ain't There"	Johnny Burke	Ramone	3:25
12.	"To Whom It May Concern"	Nat King Cole; Charlotte Hawkins	Foster	3:27
13.	"Where Can I Go Without You?"	Young; Peggy Lee	Ramone	4:23
14.	"Ahmad's Blues"	Ahmad Jamal; Bobby Williams	Duke	4:13
15.	"Pick Yourself Up"	Dorothy Fields; Jerome Kern	Ramone	3:31
16.	"If You Could See Me Now"	Tadd Dameron; Carl Sigman	Duke	4:42
17.	"Like a Lover"	Alan and Marilyn Bergman; Nelson Motta	Natalie Cole; Duke	5:17
18.	"This Morning It Was Summer"	Bob Haymes	Foster	3:24
19.	"When I Fall in Love" (Spanish Version)	Heyman; Young	Foster	4:12
Total length:				78:30

Notes

- Nat King Cole's "Let's Face the Music and Dance" originally recorded on November 21, 1961
- Nat King Cole's "When I Fall in Love" originally recorded on December 28, 1956
- Portuguese lyrics on "Dindi" written by Louis Oliveira
- Additional lyrics on "Two for the Blues" written by Natalie Cole
- Additional Portuguese lyrics on by Dori Caymmi, Dorival Caymmi and Natalie Cole

== Personnel ==
Information is based on the album's Liner Notes Musicians and Vocalists

- Natalie Cole – vocals, backing vocals (7, 10)
- Terry Trotter – acoustic piano (1, 4, 5, 12, 13, 16–18), Fender Rhodes (1, 13), keyboards (12, 18)
- Michael Lang – acoustic piano (2)
- Rob Mounsey – acoustic piano (3, 6, 8, 9, 11, 15), additional keyboards (3), keyboards (6, 8, 9, 11, 15)
- Nat King Cole – Hammond B3 organ solo (3), vocals (5)
- George Duke – acoustic piano (7), keyboards (7, 10),vibraphone (10)
- Bob James – keyboards (14), acoustic piano solo (14)
- John Chiodini – guitars (1, 2, 4, 5, 12, 13, 16–18), acoustic guitar (7)
- John Pizzarelli – guitars (3, 6, 8, 9, 11)
- Paul Jackson Jr. – electric guitar (7, 10)
- Lee Ritenour – guitar solo (14)
- Jim Hughart – bass (1, 4, 13, 16)
- Chuck Domanico – bass (2, 5)
- David Finck – bass (3, 6, 8, 9, 11, 15)
- Reggie Hamilton – bass (7, 10)
- Chuck Berghofer – bass (12, 18)
- Nathan East – bass (14, 17)
- Harold Jones – drums (1, 4, 13, 16)
- Ralph Penland – drums (2)
- Chris Parker – drums (3, 6, 8, 9, 11, 15)
- John Guerin – drums (5, 12, 18)
- John Robinson – drums (7, 10)
- Harvey Mason – drums (14)
- Bashiri Johnson – percussion (6, 9, 15)
- Paulinho da Costa – percussion (7, 17)
- Rafael Padilla – percussion (14)
- Dan Higgins – saxophone solo (5)
- Everette Harp – alto saxophone solo (10)
- Michael Brecker – saxophone solo (15)
- Jon Clarke – oboe solo (5)
- George Bohanon – trombone solo (4)
- Wynton Marsalis – trumpet solo (8)
- Toots Thielemans – harmonica solo (7, 9)
- Janis Siegel – backing and harmony vocals (10)

Music arrangements

- Alan Broadbent – music arrangements (1–3, 5, 11, 13)
- John Clayton – music arrangements (4)
- Natalie Cole – vocal arrangements (5, 7, 14), music arrangements (17)
- David Foster – music and vocal arrangements (5)
- Gordon Jenkins – original music arrangements (5)
- Rob Mounsey – music arrangements (6, 8, 9, 15)
- George Duke – music arrangements (7, 10, 17), horn arrangements (10), vocal arrangements (14)
- Clare Fischer – strings arrangements (7, 17)
- Jerry Hey – horns arrangements (10, 14)
- Johnny Mandel – music arrangements (12, 18)
- Bob James – music arrangements (14)
- Charles Floyd – music arrangements (16)
- Jim Hughart – music arrangements (16)

== Production ==
- Natalie Cole – executive producer, album concept, producer (17)
- Phil Ramone – producer (1, 3, 6, 8, 9, 11, 13, 15)
- David Foster – producer (2, 5, 12, 18)
- George Duke – producer (4, 7, 10, 14, 16, 17)
- Debbie Datz, Jill Dell'Abate, Bill Hughes, Morris Repass and Patti Zimmitti – orchestra and big band contractors
- Simon Ramone – production assistant (1, 3, 6, 8, 9, 11, 13, 15)
- Corrine Duke – production assistant (4, 7, 10, 14, 16, 17)
- Shari Sutcliffe – project coordinator
- Benita Hill Johnson – personal assistant
- Gabrielle Raumberger – art direction
- Emily Rich – design
- Rocky Schenck – photography
- Janet Zeitoun – hair
- Tara Posey – make-up
- Cecille Parker – stylist
- Dick La Palm – liner notes, research
- Dan Cleary – management
- Dori Caymmi, Helena Caymmi, David Romano, Roberta Taurello and Veronique Triquet – linguists

Technical credits

- Al Schmitt – mixing, track recording (1, 5, 12, 13, 18), vocal recording (1, 5, 13, 18)
- Elliot Scheiner – vocal recording (1, 3, 6, 8, 9, 11, 13, 15), track recording (3, 6, 8, 9, 11, 15)
- David Reitzas – vocal recording (2, 4, 5, 12, 14, 17, 18), track recording (5)
- Erik Zobler – track recording (4, 7, 10, 14, 16, 17), vocal recording (4, 7, 10, 14, 16)
- Felipe Elgueta – additional engineer
- Wayne Holmes – additional engineer
- Henk Korff – additional engineer
- John Patterson – additional engineer
- Patrick Ulenberg – additional engineer
- Jeffrey Demorris – assistant engineer
- Peter Doell – assistant engineer
- Koji Egawa – assistant engineer
- Rob Frank – assistant engineer
- Barry Goldberg – assistant engineer
- John Hendrickson –assistant engineer
- Glenn Marchese – assistant engineer
- Eddie Miller – assistant engineer
- Charlie Paakkari – assistant engineer
- Rail Rogut – assistant engineer
- Robbes Stieglitz – assistant engineer

== Charts ==
Chart (1996)	Peak position
Australian Albums (ARIA Charts)	33
U.S. Billboard 200	20
U.S. Billboard Top R&B/Hip-Hop Albums	11

== Certifications ==
Region	Certification	Certified units/sales
United States (RIAA)	Platinum	1,000,000^{^}
^{^} Shipments figures based on certification alone.
