= Michael Carr (composer) =

British popular music composer and lyricist (1905–1968)

- Born: Maurice Alfred Cohen; 11 March 1905; Leeds, Yorkshire, England
- Died: 16 September 1968 (aged 63); London, England
- Occupations: Composer; lyricist

Michael Carr (born Maurice Alfred Cohen; 11 March 1905 – 16 September 1968) was a British and Irish popular music composer and lyricist, best remembered for the song "South of the Border (Down Mexico Way)", written with Irishman Jimmy Kennedy for the 1939 film of the same name.

== Life and career ==
Born in Leeds, the son of cabinet maker and boxer Morris "Cockney" Cohen and Gertrude J. Beresford, Carr was brought up in Ireland, where his father ran a restaurant in Dublin. In his teens he ran away to sea, and took various jobs in the United States, including cowboy in Montana, pianist in Las Vegas, and newspaper reporter. Under the name of Michael Carr, he played a number of small roles in Hollywood films.

He returned to Dublin in 1930, and began writing tunes. A local bandleader suggested that he move to London, and enabled his introduction to lyricist Jimmy Kennedy. In 1934 he settled in London, where he worked for a music company. Initially he wrote cowboy songs such as "Ole Faithful", drawing on his experiences in the US, and then, usually with Kennedy, wrote and co-wrote several songs for such performers as Gracie Fields. His successful songs included "The Girl with the Dreamy Eyes" (1935, written with Eddie Pola), "Dinner For One Please, James" (1935), and "The Little Boy that Santa Claus Forgot" (1937, written with Tommie Connor and Jimmy Leach). One of his best-known songs, written with Kennedy, was "We're Going to Hang out the Washing on the Siegfried Line" (1939). During the Second World War he served in the army. In 1942 he composed "Freedom Concerto".

Among Carr's other compositions were "Lonely Ballerina" (1954) for the Mantovani Orchestra, and two instrumental pieces which were hits for the Shadows: "Man of Mystery" (UK No. 5 hit in December 1960) and "Kon-Tiki" (UK No. 1 hit in October 1961). "Man of Mystery" was the theme music for the early 1960s film series Edgar Wallace Mysteries based on the prodigious output of the writer Edgar Wallace.

Carr collaborated with many other British songwriters such as Jack Popplewell, Jack Strachey and Eric Maschwitz, and with Norrie Paramor for another Shadows tune, "The Miracle". With Ben Nisbet, Carr co-wrote the theme song to the popular 1960s children's TV series The White Horses. The song was released as the single "White Horses" sung by 'Jacky' (Jackie Lee) which became a UK No. 10 hit in April 1968. In 2003, it was named in The Penguin Television Companion as the greatest theme song in television history. Carr and Nisbet collaborated again for another song for Jacky, "Off and Running".

Carr died in London in 1968, aged 63.

== Compositions ==
Among many other songs, Carr wrote (or co-wrote):

- "Ol' Faithful" (1934) (with Kennedy); the song became the Hull Rugby League Football Club's supporters' anthem.
- "Dinner for One, Please James" (1935)
- "The General's Fast Asleep" (1935) (with Kennedy)
- "Getting Around and About" (1935) (with Lewis Ilda)
- "Old Timer" (1935) (with Lewis Ilda)
- "Girl with the Dreamy Eyes" (1935) (with Eddie Pola)
- "Orchids to My Lady" (1935)
- "Misty Islands of the Highlands" (1935) (with Kennedy)
- "The Wheel of the Wagon Is Broken" (1935) (with Elton Box & Desmond Cox)
- "Did Your Mother Come from Ireland" (1936) (with Kennedy)
- "The Sunset Trail" (1936) (with Kennedy)
- "Why Did She Fall for the Leader of the Band?" (1936) (with Kennedy)
- "Cowboy" (1937)
- "Home Town" (1937) (with Kennedy)
- "The Little Boy that Santa Claus Forgot" (1937) (with Tommie Connor & Jimmy Leach)
- "Cinderella, Stay in My Arms" (1938)
- "South of the Border" (1939) (with Kennedy)
- "On the Outside Looking in" (1939)
- "Somewhere in France with You" (1939)
- "(We're Gonna Hang out the) Washing on the Siegfried Line" (1939) (with Kennedy)
- "A Handsome Territorial" (1939) (with Kennedy)
- "The First Lullaby" (1941) (with Popplewell)
- "A Pair Of Silver Wings" (1941) (with Eric Maschwitz)
- "I Love To Sing" (1943) (with Paul Misrake & Tommie Connor)
- "When You Talk About Old Ireland" (1951) (with Tommie Connor)
