= Nick Ceroli =

American drummer (1939–1985)

- Born: Nicholas Mathew Ceroli; December 22, 1939; Niles, Ohio, U.S.
- Died: August 11, 1985 (aged 45) Studio City, California, U.S.
- Genres: Jazz
- Occupation: Musician
- Instrument: Drums

Nicholas Mathew Ceroli (December 22, 1939 – August 11, 1985) was an American jazz drummer.

== Biography ==
Ceroli was born in Niles, Ohio, United States. He did a tour of Central and South America in 1963 with Ray Anthony, and that same year recorded with Jack Teagarden and played with Gerald Wilson at the Monterey Jazz Festival. In 1965, he played with Stan Kenton, then spent from 1965 until 1969 playing in Herb Alpert's group, the Tijuana Brass. He moved to Hollywood and became a prolific studio musician, working with Pete Jolly (c. 1969), Zoot Sims (1976, 1984), Richie Kamuca (1977), Warne Marsh (1977–78), Ross Tompkins (1977), Bill Berry (1978), Dave Frishberg (1978), Pete Christlieb (1978), Bob Florence (1979–81), and Milt Jackson (1981).

Ceroli died of a heart attack at his home in Studio City, California at the age of 45.

== Discography ==
With Herb Alpert

- !!Going Places!! (A&M, 1965)
- S.R.O. (A&M, 1966)
- What Now My Love (A&M, 1966)
- Herb Alpert's Ninth (A&M, 1967)
- Sounds Like... (A&M, 1967)
- Christmas Album (A&M, 1968)
- Beat Of The Brass (A&M, 1968)
- The Brass Are Comin' (A&M, 1969)

With Pete Christlieb

- Apogee (Warner Bros., 1978)
- Self Portrait (Bosco, 1981)
- The Pete Christlieb Quartet Live Dinos' '83 (Bosco, 1983)
- Conversations with Warne (Criss Cross, 1991)

With Bob Florence

- Live at Concerts by the Sea (Trend, 1980)
- Westlake (Discovery, 1981)
- Soaring (Bosco, 1982)
- Magic Time (Trend, 1984)

With Peggy Lee

- Somethin' Groovy! (Capitol, 1967)

With Ross Tompkins

- Ross Tompkins and Good Friends (Concord Jazz, 1978)
- Street of Dreams (Famous Door, 1983)
- L. A. After Dark (Famous Door, 1986)

With others

- Bill Berry, Shortcake (Concord Jazz, 1994)
- Stan Freeman, Not A Care in the World (Audiophile, 1986)
- Dave Frishberg, You're a Lucky Guy (Concord Jazz, 1978)
- Lani Hall, Hello It's Me (A&M, 1975)
- Milt Jackson, Big Mouth (Pablo, 1981)
- Pete Jolly, Timeless (Solid, 2017)
- Stan Kenton, Stan Kenton Conducts the Los Angeles Neophonic Orchestra (Capitol, 1965)
- Irene Kral, Kral Space (Catalyst, 1977)
- Cleo Laine & Dudley Moore, Smilin' Through (CBS, 1982)
- Mundell Lowe, Guitar Player (Dobre, 1977)
- Mundell Lowe, Mundell Lowe Presents TransitWest (Pausa, 1983)
- Teena Marie, Robbery (Epic, 1983)
- Warne Marsh, Warne Out (Interplay, 1977)
- Warne Marsh, Noteworthy (Discovery, 1988)
- Don Menza, First Flight (Catalyst, 1977)
- Don Menza, Burnin (M&K, 1981)
- Lanny Morgan, It's About Time (Palo Alto, 1985)
- Tom Netherton, Just As I Am (Word, 1976)
- Michael Parks, You Don't Know Me (First American, 1981)
- Art Pepper, Live at Donte's Vol. 1 (Fresh Sound, 1987)
- Art Pepper, Live at Donte's Vol. 2 (Fresh Sound, 1989)
- John Pisano, Under the Blanket (A&M, 1970)
- Sue Raney, Ridin' High (Discovery, 1984)
- Ann Richards with the Bill Marx Trio, Live at the Losers (Vee Jay, 1963)
- Jack Sheldon, Singular (Beez, 1980)
- Zoot Sims, Hawthorne Nights (Pablo, 1977)
- Zoot Sims, Plays Johnny Mandel Quietly There (Pablo, 1984)
- Jack Teagarden, A Hundred Years from Today (Grudge, 1990)
- Patty Weaver, Feelings (SE, 1976)

== Bibliography ==
- Ceroli, Nick (1985). Speed and Endurance Studies. Alfred Music. ISBN 978-0739024911.
