= The Little Boy that Santa Claus Forgot =

Song by Vera Lynn
- Published: 1937
- Genre: Christmas music
- Songwriters: Michael Carr; Tommie Connor; Jimmy Leach

"The Little Boy that Santa Claus Forgot" is a 1937 song written by Michael Carr, Tommie Connor, and Jimmy Leach, most notably performed by Vera Lynn. It is also known for the use of her version in the opening scene in Pink Floyd film Pink Floyd The Wall (1982).

The song takes place at Christmas and describes a young boy to whom Santa Claus forgot to bring toys. As all the other children have fun with their new toys, the little boy is lonely and sad. In the end, the singer reveals that the child has no father, giving listeners the real reason why nobody brought him toys.

Other people who have recorded it include Johnny Adams, Billy Mackenzie, Elsie Carlisle, Nat King Cole, Natalie Cole, Billy Cotton, John Farnham, Alex Harvey, and Arthur Tracy. A portion of the song was sung by Jim Belushi in the 1996 film Jingle All the Way.
