= Pete Christlieb =

American jazz tenor saxophonist (b. 1945)

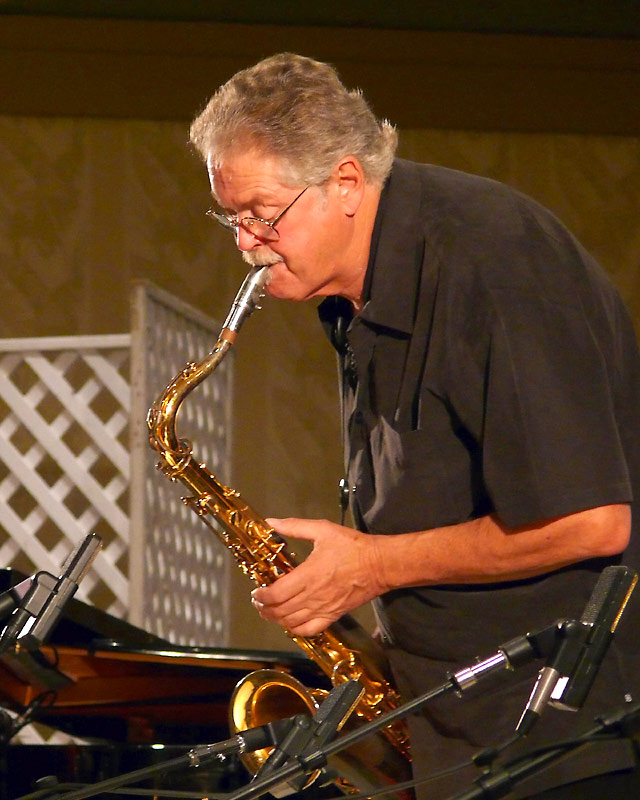
- Christlieb in Los Angeles, 2007

Background information
- Born: February 16, 1945 (age 81); Los Angeles, California, U.S.
- Genres: Jazz
- Occupation: Musician
- Instrument: Tenor saxophone
- Formerly of: The NBC Orchestra
- Website: petechristlieb.com

Peter Christlieb (born February 16, 1945) is an American tenor saxophonist who plays in the styles of jazz bebop, West Coast jazz, hard bop and pop music.

== Biography ==
Christlieb was born in Los Angeles, California, United States, the son of bassoonist Donald Orville Christlieb and Pearl Gold. Christlieb has worked with many musicians, such as Louie Bellson, Chet Baker, Woody Herman, Count Basie, Tom Waits, Warne Marsh, Vince Guaraldi, Quincy Jones, Doc Severinsen, The Tonight Show Band, Bob Florence, Frank Mantooth, Gary Urwin, Phil Kelly, and Bill Holman.

Christlieb played both of the saxophone solos on Steely Dan's hit song "Deacon Blues". Steely Dan asked him to perform on the song after they were impressed by his playing on The Tonight Show Starring Johnny Carson. Christlieb recalled:

I went over to the studio one night after the Tonight Show finished taping at 6:30 p.m. When I listened on headphones to the track Tom [Scott] had arranged, there was just enough space for me to play a solo. As I listened, I realized Donald [Fagen] and Walter [Becker, songwriters for Steely Dan] were using jazz chord changes, not the block chords of rock. This gave me a solid base for improvisation. They just told me to play what I felt. Hey, I'm a jazz musician, that’s what I do. So I listened again and recorded my first solo. We listened back and they said it was great. I recorded a second take and that's the one they used. I was gone in a half-hour. The next thing I know I'm hearing myself in every airport bathroom in the world.

Christlieb also played on Natalie Cole's Grammy award-winning album Unforgettable... with Love and the extended tenor sax solo on the song "FM (No Static at All)" from the film FM.

Christlieb plays with his recently formed 11-piece group, the "Tall & Small Band"; the Bill Holman Orchestra; and his own quartet. Also, for years Christlieb has been involved in professional drag racing, with his cars participating in numerous races in the southwest and across the country. His team has won two national championships for the 'Blown Alcohol Dragster' class.

Christlieb played a jazz musician in the Star Trek: Deep Space Nine episode "His Way".

== Discography ==
=== As leader or co-leader ===
- Jazz City: A Quartet with Pete Christlieb (RAHMP, 1971)
- Apogee (with Warne Marsh) (Warner Bros., 1978)
- Self Portrait (Bosco, 1981)
- Going My Way (Bosco, 1982)
- Dino's '83 (Bosco, 1983)
- Mosaic (with Bob Cooper) (Capri, 1990)
- Conversations with Warne Volume 1 (with Warne Marsh) (Criss Cross, 1990)
- Conversations with Warne Volume 2 (with Warne Marsh) (Criss Cross, 1995)
- Get Happy – Don Lanphere & Pete Christlieb with New Stories (Origin, 1996)
- The Tenor Trio – Ernie Watts/Pete Christlieb/Rickey Woodard (JMI/JVC, 1997)
- Red Kelly's Heroes (with the Bill Ramsay/Milt Kleeb Band) (CARS, 1997)
- Live At Capozzoli's (Las Vegas Late Night Sessions) – Pete Christlieb/Andy Martin Quintet (Woofy, 1998)
- For Heaven's Sake (CARS, 1999)
- Late Night Jazz – Pete Christlieb & Slyde Hyde (Vertical Jazz/Fine Tune, 2000)
- Live at the Jazz Cave (Cognito, 2006)
- Reunion – Hadley Caliman & Pete Christlieb (Origin, 2010)
- High On U – Tall & Small: The Pete Christlieb & Linda Small Eleven-Piece Band (Bosco, 2011)

With Doc Severinsen

- The Tonight Show Band with Doc Severinsen (Amherst, 1986)
- The Tonight Show Band with Doc Severinsen, Vol. II (Amherst, 1988)
- Once More...With Feeling! (Amherst, 1991)
- Merry Christmas From Doc Severinsen & the Tonight Show Orchestra (Amherst, 1991)

=== As sideman or guest ===
With Louie Bellson

- 1974 150 MPH – Louie Bellson Big Band
- 1975 The Louis Bellson Explosion
- 1976 Live at Concord Summer Festival – Louie Bellson's 7
- 1977 Prime Time
- 1978 Sunshine Rock – Louie Bellson & The Explosion Orchestra
- 1978 Matterhorn: Louie Bellson Drum Explosion
- 1979 Louis Bellson Jam
- 1984 Don't Stop Now!
- 1996 Their Time Was the Greatest – Louie Bellson Honors 12 Super-Drummers
- 1997 Air Bellson – Louie Bellson's Magic 7
- 1998 The Art of the Chart – Louie Bellson's Big Band Explosion!

With Wayne Bergeron

- 2002 You Call This a Living?
- 2007 Plays Well with Others

With Bobby Caldwell

- 1996 Blue Condition
- 1999 Come Rain or Come Shine

With Frank Capp

- 1982 Juggernaut Strikes Again!
- 1995 In a Hefti Bag
- 1997 Play It Again Sam

With Rosemary Clooney

- 1992 Girl Singer
- 2002 Out of This World

With Natalie Cole

- 1991 Unforgettable... with Love
- 1993 Take a Look
- 1999 Snowfall on the Sahara
- 2008 Still Unforgettable

With Bob Florence

- 1979 Live at Concerts by the Sea
- 1981 Westlake
- 1982 Soaring
- 1992 Jewels - compilation

With Vince Guaraldi

- 1969 It Was a Short Summer, Charlie Brown

With Bill Holman

- 1995 A View from the Side
- 1997 Brilliant Corners: The Music of Thelonious Monk
- 2007 Hommage

With Quincy Jones

- 1971 Smackwater Jack
- 1974 Body Heat
- 1976 I Heard That!!
- 1995 Q's Jook Joint
- 1999 From Q with Love
- 2000 Basie and Beyond (with Sammy Nestico)

With Phil Kelly & The Northwest Prevailing Winds

- 2003 Convergence Zone
- 2006 My Museum – Phil Kelly & The Southwest Santa Ana Winds
- 2009 Ballet Of The Bouncing Beagles

With Seth MacFarlane

- 2011 Music Is Better Than Words
- 2017 In Full Swing

With The Manhattan Transfer

- 1977 Pastiche
- 1991 The Offbeat of Avenues
- 1992 The Christmas Album

With Frank Mantooth

- 1987 Per-Se-Vere
- 1995 Sophisticated Lady
- 1999 Miracle

With Diane Schuur

- 1986 Timeless
- 1993 Love Songs

With Tom Scott

- 1973 Great Scott
- 1982 Desire
- 1983 Target
- 1991 Keep This Love Alive
- 1992 Born Again
- 1995 Night Creatures
- 1999 Smokin' Section

With Keely Smith

- 2000 Swing, Swing, Swing
- 2001 Keely Sings Sinatra
- 2002 Keely Swings Basie-Style with Strings

With Gary Urwin Jazz Orchestra

- 2000 Perspectives
- 2001 Living In The Moment [rel. 2003]
- 2006 Kindred Spirits – Bill Watrous/Pete Christlieb/Gary Urwin Jazz Orchestra
- 2014 A Beautiful Friendship – Bill Watrous/Pete Christlieb/Carl Saunders/Gary Urwin Jazz Orchestra
- 2024 Flying Colors – Gary Urwin Jazz Orchestra And Friends

With Tom Waits

- 1974 The Heart of Saturday Night
- 1975 Nighthawks at the Diner [live]

With Anthony Wilson

- 1997 Anthony Wilson
- 1999 Adult Themes

=== With others ===
- 1968 Sonny's Dream (Birth of the New Cool), Sonny Criss
- 1970 Music from 'The Adventurers' , Ray Brown
- 1972 Free Again, Gene Ammons
- 1972 Sarah Vaughan with Michel Legrand, Sarah Vaughan
- 1973 Corazón, Percy Faith
- 1974 Dreamer, Bobby "Blue" Bland
- 1974 Let's Love, Peggy Lee
- 1975 High Energy, Freddie Hubbard
- 1976 Can't Hide Love, Carmen McRae
- 1976 Earl Klugh, Earl Klugh
- 1977 Aja, Steely Dan
- 1978 FM, Steely Dan
- 1978 3-Way Mirror, Livingston Taylor
- 1978 Frankie Valli...Is the Word, Frankie Valli
- 1979 Donald Byrd and 125th Street N.Y.C., Donald Byrd
- 1979 Palette, Alan Broadbent
- 1979 Street of Dreams Bill Henderson
- 1979 The Cat and the Hat, Ben Sidran
- 1980 Growing Up in Hollywood Town, Lincoln Mayorga/Amanda McBroom
- 1980 Night Song, Ahmad Jamal
- 1981 Playin' It Straight, Jack Sheldon
- 1982 Dawg Jazz/Dawg Grass, David Grisman
- 1982 It's a Fact, Jeff Lorber
- 1984 Then and Now, Joe Williams (with Mike Melvoin)
- 1989 Sarabanda, Martin Taylor
- 1991 Never Let Me Go, Toni Tennille
- 1992 Sweet Simon, Conte Candoli
- 1992 Lunarcy, Lou Levy
- 1993 Forever, Michael Feinstein
- 1993 Homage to Duke, Dave Grusin
- 1993 Michel Plays Legrand, Michel Legrand
- 1993 Rules of the Road, Anita O'Day
- 1994 Masterpieces, The Singers Unlimited
- 1994 Somebody Loves Me, Frank Strazzeri
- 1998 Big Band Favorites of Sammy Nestico, Sammy Nestico
- 1998 The Magic Band II, Howard Roberts
- 1998 When I Look in Your Eyes, Diana Krall
- 2001 Singin' and Swingin' , Joey DeFrancesco
- 2002 A Jazz Musician's Christmas, Tom Kubis
- 2002 The House I Live In, Tony Danza
- 2002 Waves: The Bossa Nova Sessions, Eden Atwood
- 2003 From Me to You: A Tribute to Lionel Hampton, Terry Gibbs
- 2004 Jazz Standards, Stanley Clarke
- 2005 Big Band, Kevin Mahogany
- 2005 Let Me Off Uptown, Cheryl Bentyne
- 2006 Back in Town, Matt Dusk
- 2006 Round Trip, Marilyn Harris
- 2007 The Lost Bill Holman Charts, Carl Saunders
- 2009 At Last, Lynda Carter
- 2012 Ellington Saxophone Encounters, Mark Masters
- 2013 Made in California (1962–2012), The Beach Boys
- 2013 To Be Loved, Michael Bublé
- 2018 Sunlight, Chris Standring
