= Tommie Connor =

British lyricist and songwriter (1904–1993)

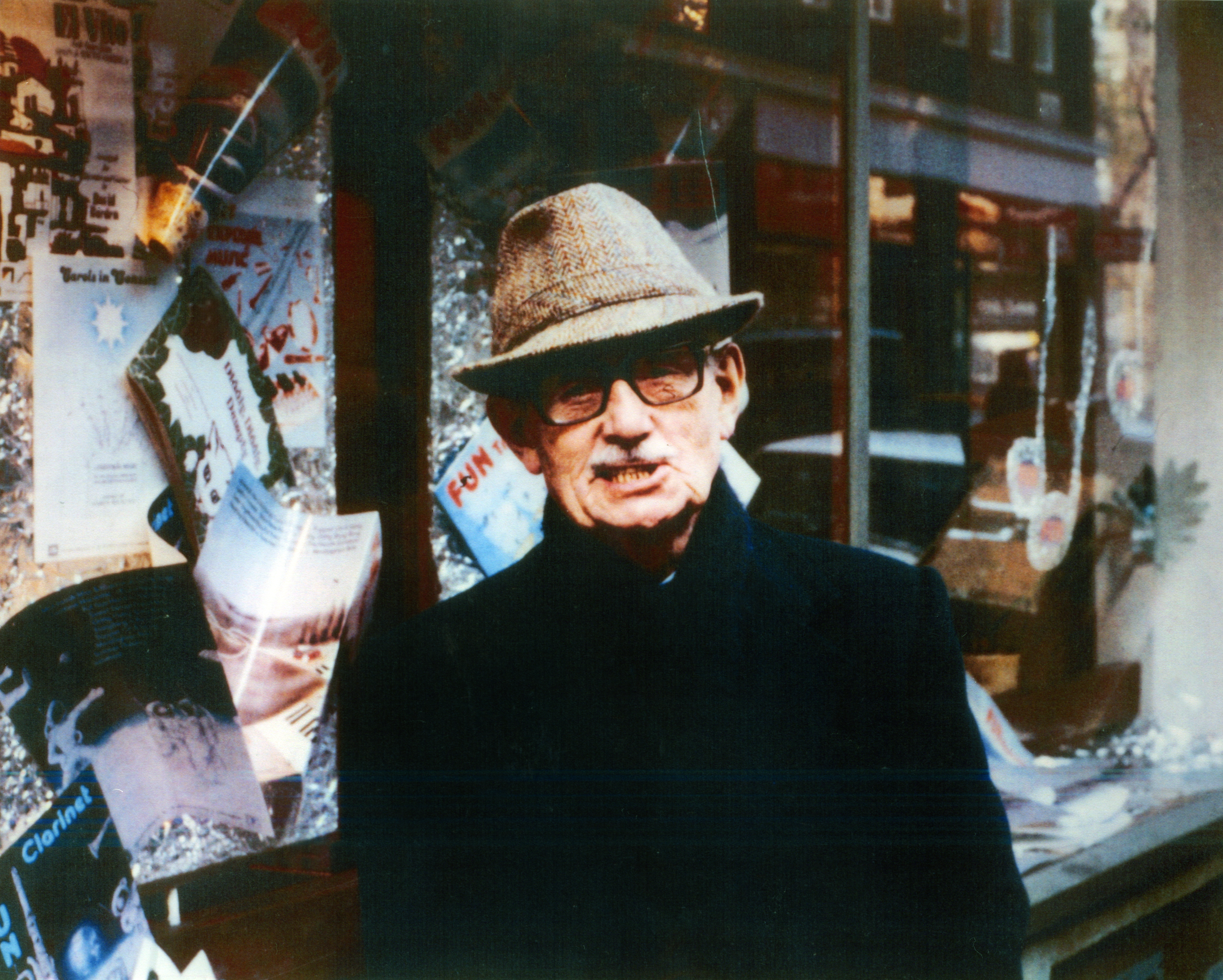
- Connor c. 1980

Background information
- Born: Thomas Patrick Connor; 16 November 1904; Bloomsbury, London, England
- Died: 28 November 1993 (aged 89) Farnborough, Kent, England
- Genres: Traditional pop, Christmas music
- Occupations: Songwriter; lyricist
- Years active: 1932–1960s

Thomas Patrick Connor (16 November 1904 – 28 November 1993) was a British lyricist and songwriter, credited with several hit songs over his long career. He wrote several of the most popular non-religious Christmas songs, including "The Little Boy that Santa Claus Forgot", "I'm Sending a Letter to Santa Claus", and "I Saw Mommy Kissing Santa Claus", as well as the lyrics for such popular songs as "Lili Marlene" and "The Biggest Aspidistra in the World".

== Life and career ==
He was born and raised in Bloomsbury, London, England, to parents of Irish descent. In his teens, he worked as a call boy in London theatres, and started writing his own words to well-known tunes. The composer Herbert Stothart was impressed, and suggested that he become a songwriter after gaining more experience of the world. Connor then worked for two years as a steward aboard the RMS Empress of France, before returning to England with the intention of earning his living as a songwriter.

After several years of trying to sell his songs in Denmark Street, his first published song was "My Home Town" in 1932, which was recorded by child star Little Mary Hagan. Two years later, his song "Jump on the Wagon" was described as a "number one radio hit". By 1935, he started working with composer Edward Lisbona of Ambrose's orchestra, and they wrote "It's My Mother's Birthday Today", which was a hit for Arthur Tracy, who was known as "The Street Singer".

Connor continued to write successfully over the next twenty years, mostly in Britain but occasionally spending time in the United States, mainly Los Angeles and New York. His most successful songs included "When The Guardsman Started Crooning On Parade" (1935), "The Little Boy that Santa Claus Forgot" (1937), "The Biggest Aspidistra in the World" (1938), "I'm Sending a Letter to Santa" (1939), "Who's Taking You Home Tonight?" (1940), "Be Like the Kettle and Sing" (1943), "Lili Marlene" (for which he wrote the English words, 1944), "I Saw Mommy Kissing Santa Claus" (1952), and "Never Do a Tango with an Eskimo" (1956). "I'm Sending a Letter to Santa Claus" was published with words and music by Lanny Rogers and Spencer Williams, Rogers being a pseudonym for Connor.

He also wrote for films and shows, and for singers such as Gracie Fields, Vera Lynn and Maurice Chevalier. As well as Lisbona and Williams, his co-writers included Horatio Nicholls, Jimmy Kennedy, Robert Stoltz, and Michael Carr. In the 1966 Spaghetti Western The Good, The Bad, and The Ugly, Connor provided lyrics to "The Story of a Soldier".

Connor had five children, born to his wife Catherine Connor (née McCarthy). He died in November 1993 in Farnborough, Kent, England.

== Catalogue ==
Songs with Connor given writing credits, as well as recording artists include:

Title	Artist(s)
"My Home Town" (1932)	
"Jump on the Wagon" (1935)	
"It's My Mother's Birthday Today" (1935)	Arthur Tracy
"I Once Had a Heart Margarita" (1935)	
"Mickey's Son and Daughter" (1935)	Henry Hall (bandleader)
"When the Guardsman Started Crooning on Parade" (1935)	
"It's Never Too Late to Mend" (1937)	
"The Little Boy that Santa Claus Forgot" (1937)	Vera Lynn
"(Underneath) The (Spreading) Chestnut Tree" (1938)	Glenn Miller
"The Biggest Aspidistra in the World" (1938)	Gracie Fields
"Who's Taking You Home Tonight?" (1939)	
"Til the Lights of London Shine Again" (1939)	
"I'm Spending Christmas with the Old Folks" (1940)	
"If Tears Could Bring You Back" (1940)	
"The Little Boy Who Never Told a Lie" (1940)	
"I've Got You Where I Want You" (1940)	
"Was It the Orchids You Wore?" (1941)	
"Ridin' Home on the Buggy in the Moonlight" (1941)	
"Thanks to Love" (1941)	
"Not a Cloud in the Sky" (1942)	
"Be Like the Kettle and Sing" (1943)	Vera Lynn
"I Love to Sing" (1943)	Vera Lynn (in the film Rhythm Serenade)
"The Lover's Lullaby" (1943)	Geraldo and his orchestra
"Lili Marlene" (1944)	Perry Como, Vera Lynn, Anne Shelton
"My Beautiful Sarie Marais" (1945)	
"It's Good to See You Honey" (1945)	
"The Wedding of the Royal Princess" (1947)	
"Down in the Glen" (1947)	
"Hang on the Bell, Nellie" (1948)	
"It Began with a Tango" (1948)	Gracie Fields
"Hold Me Just a Little Closer Dear" (1948)	Anne Shelton
"When the Heather Gleams Like Stardust (In the Glen)" (1949)	Robert Wilson
"The Scottish Samba" (1949)	
"Addormentarmi Cosi (So Ends My Search for a Dream)" (1949)	
"The Wedding of Lili Marlene" (1949)	
"Tipperary Samba" (1950)	
"Sleepy Eyes" (1950)	
"The Rose I Bring You" (1950)	
"My Christmas Wish" (1950)	
"The Village of Christmas Pie" (1950)	
"When You Talk About Old Ireland" (1950)	Josef Locke
"Five Minutes to Midnight" (1951)	The Radio Revellers
"Rosaline" (1951)	Joe Loss
"Lilli Marlene's Lullaby" (1952)	
"The Homing Waltz" (1952)	Phil Tate
"I Saw Mommy Kissing Santa Claus" (1952)	Jimmy Boyd, The Beverley Sisters
"Arriverderci (Till Our Next Meeting)" (1952)	Gracie Fields
"(We Must Have Safety On) The Queens Highway" (1953)	
"Kiss Me Again" (1953)	
"The Engagement Waltz" (1955)	
"Never Do a Tango with an Eskimo" (1955)	Alma Cogan
"Give Her My Love (When You Meet Her)" (1956)	
"Rooney" (1958)	
"The Story of a Soldier" (1968)	
"I'm Backing Britain" (1968)	Bruce Forsyth
"O'Rafferty's Motor Car"	Val Doonican
