= Jim Hughart =

Americana jazz and pop bass player (born 1936)

- Born: July 28, 1936 (age 90); Minneapolis, Minnesota, United States
- Genres: Jazz
- Occupation: Musician
- Instrument: Bass

James David Hughart (born July 28, 1936) is a jazz and pop bass player.

== Biography ==
Hughart was born in Minneapolis, Minnesota, United States, and is the son of Frederick (Fritz) Hughart, bassist with Minneapolis Symphony and San Diego Symphony, and Annette Hughart (née Bastien). Hughart began working as a musician in 1953.

In 1957, he received a BA (Music Composition & Theory, Bass) from the University of Minnesota. Following graduation, Hughart was drafted and for two years, traveled throughout Europe performing with the Seventh Army Symphony Orchestra. After his discharge from the Army, he joined Ella Fitzgerald's touring band following a recommendation from Ray Brown. During his three years with Ella Fitzgerald, Hughart started his extensive recording career.

In 1964, he moved to Los Angeles and became a very active session musician. He studied electric bass under prolific session musician Carol Kaye. On her website, she declares Hughart to be a "great talent and jazz legend".

Hughart performed as a regular sideman for guitarist Joe Pass and singer Tom Waits.

He has participated in over 200 record albums, 300 motion picture scores, and many television shows. Hughart has recorded with many artists including Frank Sinatra, Peggy Lee, Diana Ross, Joni Mitchell, Joan Baez, Barry Manilow, Tom Waits, Frank Rosolino, Paul Smith, Barney Kessel, Milt Jackson and Natalie Cole.

He works locally and resides in Los Angeles, California.

== Selected discography ==
With David Axelrod

- The Auction (Decca, 1972)
- Seriously Deep (Polydor, 1975)
- Strange Ladies (MCA Records, 1977)
- Marchin' (MCA Records, 1980)
- David Axelrod (No' Wax, 2001)

With Natalie Cole

- Unforgettable... with Love (Elektra Records, 1991)
- Take a Look (Elektra Records, 1993)
- Holly & Ivy (Elektra, 1994)
- Stardust (Elektra Records, 1996)
- Snowfall on the Sahara (Elektra Records, 1999)
- Still Unforgettable (Atco Records, 2008)

With Marla Gibbs

- It's Never Too Late! (Forever 30, 2006)

With Warne Marsh

- Warne Out (Interplay, 1977)
- Two Days in the Life of... (Interplay, 1987)

With Joe Pass

- For Django (Pacific Records, 1964)
- Live at Donte's (Pablo Records, 1974)
- Ira, George and Joe (Pablo Records, 1982)
- Summer Nights (Pablo Records, 1989)
- Appassionato (Pablo Records, 1991)
- Six-String Santa (LaserLight Digital, 1992)
- My Song (Telarc, 1993)
- Resonance (Pablo Records, 2000)

With Wayne Newton

- Daddy Don't You Walk So Fast (Chelsea, 1972)
- While We're Still Young (Chelsea, 1973)
- Tomorrow (Chelsea, 1976)
- She Believes in Me (Aries, 1979)

With Frank Sinatra

- Sinatra & Company (Reprise, 1971)
- Ol' Blue Eyes Is Back (Reprise, 1973)

With Tom Waits

- The Heart of Saturday Night (Asylum Records, 1974)
- Nighthawks at the Diner (Asylum Records, 1975)
- Small Change (Asylum Records, 1976)
- Foreign Affairs (Asylum Records, 1977)
- Blue Valentine (Asylum Records, 1978)
- Heartattack and Vine (Asylum Records, 1980)

With others

- Ella and Duke at the Cote D'Azur – Ella Fitzgerald and Duke Ellington (Verve, 1967)
- Albert's House – Chet Baker (Beverley Hills, 1969)
- Jim Sullivan – Jim Sullivan (Playboy, 1972)
- Carl and the Passions – "So Tough" – The Beach Boys (Capitol, 1972)
- Emerge – The McCrarys (Cats Eye, 1973)
- Hell Up in Harlem [Original Motion Picture Soundtrack] – Edwin Starr (Motown, 1974)
- Gracias a la Vida – Joan Baez (A&M Records, 1974)
- Court and Spark – Joni Mitchell (Asylum Records, 1974)
- Slow Dancer - Boz Scaggs (Columbia, 1974)
- Look at the Fool – Tim Buckley (Discreet, 1974)
- New Lovers and Old Friends – Johnny Rivers (Epic Records, 1975)
- Feeling Free – The Singers Unlimited (MPS, 1975)
- From the Meticulous to the Sublime – Blossom Dearie (Daffodil Records, 1975)
- Hello It's Me – Lani Hall (A&M Records, 1975)
- Alessi – Alessi Brothers (A&M Records, 1976)
- Kelly – Kelly Garrett (RCA Records, 1976)
- Les Dudek – Les Dudek (Columbia Records, 1976)
- Just You and Me – Herb Alpert (A&M Records, 1976)
- 15 Big Ones – The Beach Boys (Reprise Records, 1976)
- Lisa Hartman – Lisa Hartman Black (Kirshner, 1976)
- Time Is on My Side – Tracy Nelson (MCA, 1976)
- A Special Blend – The Singers Unlimited (MPS, 1976)
- Homemade Love – Thom Bresh (Farr, 1976)
- Amoroso – João Gilberto (Warner Bros. Records, 1977)
- Broken Blossom – Bette Midler (Atlantic Records, 1977)
- New Horizons – The Sylvers (Capitol Records, 1977)
- Rhapsody in Blue – Walter Murphy (Private Stock Records, 1977)
- Ear Candy - Helen Reddy (Capitol Records, 1977)
- Friends – The Singers Unlimited (Pausa, 1977)
- The Way That I Feel – Keith Sykes (Midland, 1977)
- Beauty on a Back Street – Hall & Oates (RCA Victor, 1977)
- Apogee – Pete Christlieb and Warne Marsh (Warner Bros. Records, 1978)
- We'll Sing in the Sunshine - Helen Reddy (Capitol Records, 1978)
- This Night Won't Last Forever – Bill LaBounty (Warner Bros. Records, 1978)
- ...Too - Carole Bayer Sager (Elektra Records, 1978)
- Phantom of the Opera – Walter Murphy (Private Stock Records, 1978)
- Foster Sylvers – Foster Sylvers (Capitol Records, 1978)
- Lost & Found – Keith Carradine (Asylum Records, 1978)
- Under Wraps - Shaun Cassidy (Warner Bros. Records, 1978)
- Something's Gotta Give – Bill Henderson (Discovery Records, 1979)
- Debby Boone - Debby Boone (Capitol Records, 1979)
- Newborn Woman – Vicki Lawrence (Windmill, 1979)
- Discosymphony – Walter Murphy (New York International, 1979)
- Bernadette – Bernadette Peters (MCA Records, 1980)
- You Don't Know Me – Michael Parks (First American, 1981)
- The Best Is Yet to Come – Ella Fitzgerald (Pablo, 1982)
- What's New – Linda Ronstadt (Asylum Records, 1983)
- Jump - Van Dyke Parks (Warner Bros. Records, 1984)
- For the Duration – Rosemary Clooney (Concord, 1991)
- Pure Schuur - Diane Schuur (GRP, 1991)
- Celine Dion – Céline Dion (Columbia Records, 1992)
- The Christmas Album – The Manhattan Transfer (Columbia Records, 1992)
- Reverence and Compassion – Milt Jackson (Qwest Records, 1993)
- A Single Woman – Nina Simone (Elektra Records, 1993)
- Aaron Neville's Soulful Christmas - Aaron Neville (A&M Records, 1993)
- Miracle on 34th Street [Original Motion Picture Soundtrack] – Bruce Broughton (Fox Records, 1994)
- Roy Clark & Joe Pass Play Hank Williams – Roy Clark and Joe Pass (Buster Ann, 1994)
- Wave: The Antonio Carlos Jobim Songbook – Antonio Carlos Jobim (Verve Records, 1996)
- Gently - Liza Minnelli (Angel Records, 1996)
- Duets: Live at the Great American Music Hall – Betty Carter (American Music Hall, 1996)
- The Walls Came Down - Collin Raye (Epic Records, 1998)
- A Christmas to Remember - Amy Grant (A&M Records, 1999)
- Friends for Schuur - Diane Schuur (Concord, 2000)
- A Merry Little Christmas - Linda Ronstadt (Elektra Records, 2000)
- Snowflakes - Toni Braxton (Arista, 2001)
