= John J. Moses =

John J. Moses is a New York City-based clarinetist who has played with the American Composers Orchestra, The New York Pops, and The Westchester Philharmonic. He has held a soloist or orchestral role in over 200 films and Broadway productions. Moses is a five time Grammy winner.

== Career ==
Moses performed at the opening of 26 Broadway productions including "Wicked", "Nine", "Oklahoma!", and "Sweeney Todd", working with Andrea Bocelli, Pat Metheny, and Celine Dion. He performed with the New York City Ballet Orchestra, New York City Opera, New Jersey Symphony Orchestra, the P.D.Q. Bach Orchestra, The New York Philharmonic and the St. Louis Symphony. Moses also worked on a number of film musical scores including "Interview with a Vampire", "You've Got Mail", "Beauty and the Beast", and "Aladdin" as well as television commercials for Buick, Cheerios, and MasterCard. He has appeared on The David Letterman Show and Good Morning America.

Moses was a lecturer at The Juilliard School, The Mannes College, and The Manhattan School of Music. Moses has also been part of fourteen festivals; among them The Adare Festival in Ireland, The Cabrillo Festival, Mostly Mozart-NYC, and The Spoleto Festival in Italy.

Moses won five Grammys for his work in Broadway theatre.
