= 1996 in Latin music =

This is a list of notable events in Latin music (i.e. Spanish- and Portuguese-speaking music from Latin America, Europe, and the United States) that took place in 1996.

== Events ==
- February 28 – The 38th Annual Grammy Awards are held at the Shrine Auditorium in Los Angeles, California.
  - Jon Secada wins the Grammy Award for Best Latin Pop Performance for his album Amor.
  - Gloria Estefan wins the Grammy Award for Best Tropical Latin Performance for her album Abriendo Puertas.
  - Flaco Jiménez wins the Grammy Award for Best Mexican-American/Tejano Performance for his album Flaco Jiménez.
  - Antônio Carlos Jobim posthumously wins the Grammy Award for Best Latin Jazz Album for his album Antonio Brasileiro.
- March 2 – A Learjet 25 carrying members of Brazilian comedy rock band Mamonas Assassinas crashes into the Cantareira mountain range killing everyone on board.
- April 29-May 1: The seventh annual Billboard Latin Music conference took place.
  - The third annual Billboard Latin Music Awards are also held on May. Selena becomes the most awarded artist of the award ceremony, receiving four award posthumously including Hot Latin Tracks Artist of the Year. Mexican singer Juan Gabriel is inducted into the Billboard Latin Music Hall of Fame.
- May 9 – The 8th Annual Lo Nuestro Awards are held at the James L. Knight Center in Miami, Florida. Cuban-American singer Gloria Estefan is the biggest winner with four awards.

== Bands formed ==
- Luis Damón
- Dark Latin Groove
- Grupo Límite
- Letty Guval (Tejano)
- La Makina
- Matanza
- Noemy (Tejano)
- Nydia Rojas (Tejano)
- Fey

== Number-ones albums and singles by country ==
- List of number-one albums of 1996 (Spain)
- List of number-one singles of 1996 (Spain)
- List of number-one Billboard Top Latin Albums of 1996
- List of number-one Billboard Hot Latin Tracks of 1996

== Awards ==
- 1996 Premio Lo Nuestro
- 1996 Billboard Latin Music Awards
- 1996 Tejano Music Awards

== Albums released ==
=== First quarter ===
==== January ====
Day	Title	Artist	Genre(s)	Singles	Label
9	Hora de Bailar	Sandy & Papo	Electro-House, Hip-House, Latin, Merengue		Parcha Records
16	Palabras Más, Palabras Menos	Los Rodríguez	Pop rock		GASA
23	Victor Manuelle	Víctor Manuelle	Vocal, Salsa	"Pensamiento y Palabra" "Hay Que Poner el Alma" "Volveras"	Sony Tropical, Sony Discos
30	Como Aire Fresco	Claudio	Ballad		Polydor
30	El Sonero del Mundo	Oscar D'León	Salsa	"Cuando Ya No Me Quieras" "Traicionera" "Volver a Verte"	RMM Records
30	Mi Meta	Domingo Quiñones	Salsa		RMM Records & Video Corp.

==== February ====
Day	Title	Artist	Genre(s)	Singles	Label
6	Laberinto	Miguel Bosé	Vocal, Ballad		WEA Latina, Inc.
6	The Heart Speaks	Terence Blanchard and Ivan Lins	Soul-Jazz, Contemporary Jazz	"Aparecida" "The Heart Speaks" "Chorus das Aguas"	Columbia
6	En Esta Noche	Soraya		"De Repente" "Quédate" "En Esta Noche"	PolyGram Records
13	En Blanco y Negro	Pablo Milanés and Víctor Manuel			
27	Fue Mucho Mas Que Amor	La Diferenzia	Tejano		Arista Texas
27	Tropical Tribute to the Beatles	Various artists	Salsa, Afro-Cuban, Merengue, Bolero	"Let It Be" "Day Tripper" "Come Together"	RMM Records, RMM Records
Unknown Day	Mujeriego	José José	Ballad		BMG U.S. Latin
Unknown Day	El Deseo de Oír Tu Voz	Cristian Castro	Latin, Ballad, Synth-Pop	"Amarte a Tí" "Amor"	FonoVisa

==== March ====
Day	Title	Artist	Genre(s)	Singles	Label
5	Un Tipo Común	Tito Nieves	Salsa		RMM Records

=== Second quarter ===
==== April ====
Day	Title	Artist	Genre(s)	Singles	Label
16	Dark Latin Groove	Dark Latin Groove	Salsa		Sir George Entertainment, Sony Tropical
16	My Summertime	Ray Barretto	Latin Jazz		Owl Records
23	Vida	Marcos Llunas			Mercury
30	Tony Vega	Tony Vega	Salsa	"Olvidalo Ya" "Ahora Que Te Vas" "Esperaré a Que Te Decidas"	RMM Records
Unknown Day	Pies Descalzos	Shakira	Pop rock	"Estoy Aquí" "Antología" "Un Poco de Amor" "¿Dónde Estás Corazón?"	Sony Latin
Unknown Day	Nuevos Senderos	Olga Tañón	Bolero, Vocal	"Mi Eterno Amor Secreto" "Me Subes, Me Bajas, Me Subes" "¡Basta Ya!"	Wea Latina, Inc.

==== May ====
Day	Title	Artist	Genre(s)	Singles	Label
14	Arráncame el Corazón	Ramón Ayala y sus Bravos del Norte			
15	Afrociberdelia	Chico Science & Nação Zumbi	Afrobeat, Free Funk		Columbia
21	Chaco	Illya Kuryaki and the Valderramas	Pop Rap	"Abarajame" "Jaguar House" "Hermoza from Heaven" "Abismo"	Polydor
21	Tranquilo	Frankie Ruiz	Salsa		Rodven
22	Alfagamabetizado	Carlinhos Brown	MPB, Batucada, Samba, Funk	"Pandeiro-Deiro" "Argila" "Mares de Ti" "A Namorada"	Metro Blue, Delabel
Unknown Day	Dulzura	Jennifer y los Jetz		"Ven a Mi" "Pura Dulzura"	EMI Latin
Unknown Day	Llévame Contigo	Intocable	Tejano	"No Te Vayas" "Ya Ves" "Llevame Contigo" "Y Todo Para Qué"	EMI Latin

==== June ====
Day	Title	Artist	Genre(s)	Singles	Label
11	And Then Some!	Steve Berrios and Son Bacheche	Latin Jazz		Milestone
18	Vagabundo	Draco Rosa			Sony Latin
25	Esclava De Tu Piel	Azúcar Moreno	Europop, Flamenco		Globo Records, CBS/Sony
Unknown Day	Donde Hay Música	Eros Ramazzotti	Soft Rock, Pop rock		Arista, DDD, BMG
Unknown Day	Voces Unidas	Various artists			

=== Third quarter ===
==== July ====
Day	Title	Artist	Genre(s)	Singles	Label
2	Jazzin'	Tito Puente and La India			
9	La Makina...A Mil	La Makina	Merengue		J&N Records
16	Mi Vida Loca	Los Auténticos Decadentes	Cumbia, Pop rock, Pachanga		RCA, BMG Ariola De Columbia S.A.
16	La Rosa de los Vientos	Rubén Blades	Salsa		Sony Tropical
23	Fuera de Este Mundo	Franco De Vita	Ballad		Sony Latin
Unknown Day	Vicente Fernández y sus Canciones	Vicente Fernández	Ranchera, Norteno		Sony Discos
Unknown Day	Unidos Para Siempre	Los Tigres del Norte	Norteno	"El Circo"	FonoVisa

==== August ====
Day	Title	Artist	Genre(s)	Singles	Label
20	Si El Norte Fuera El Sur	Ricardo Arjona	Acoustic, Pop rock, Soft Rock		Sony Latin
20	Fresco	Jerry Rivera	Salsa		Sony Tropical
20	Ámame una Vez Más	Amanda Miguel	Vocal, Ballad		Karen Records

==== September ====
Day	Title	Artist	Genre(s)	Singles	Label
3	Espíritu Libre	Ednita Nazario	Ballad		EMI Latin
17	En Vivo... Puro Party Live!	Jaime y los Chamacos	Tejano		Freddie Records
17	Vivencias	Ana Gabriel	Ballad, Vocal		Sony Latin
17	10th Anniversary	Fandango USA	Tejano		Freddie Records
17	Las Cosas Que Vives	Laura Pausini	Soft Rock, Ballad		Wea Latina, Inc., CGD East West
17	Volver a Nacer	Chayanne	Salsa, Ballad		Sony Latin
17	El Equilibrio de los Jaguares	Jaguares			RCA, BMG U.S. Latin
24	O Samba Poconé	Skank	Pop rock	"É Uma Partida de Futebol" "Garota Nacional" "Tão Seu"	Sony Latin, Sony Latin
24	Americano	José Feliciano	Pop rock		PolyGram Latino U.S.
24	Amor Total	Emmanuel	Ballad		Mercury
25	Un Nuevo Amor	Daniela Romo			FonoVisa
Unknown Day	Enséñame	Bobby Pulido	Tejano		EMI Latin

=== Fourth quarter ===
==== October ====
Day	Title	Artist	Genre(s)	Singles	Label
1	Dicen Que...	Albita Rodríguez	Europop	"El Chico Chevere" "Habra Musica Guajira" "Valga el Brillo de Tus Ojos"	Crescent Moon Records, Epic
1	Inolvidables	Los Ángeles Azules	Cumbia	"Como Te Voy a Olvidar" "Mi Niña Mujer"	Capitol/EMI Latin, Disa, Disa
8	Emociones	Vikki Carr	Ballad, Mariachi		Rodven Discos, PolyGram Latino
15	Quedate	Emilio Navaira			Capitol/EMI Latin
15	Partiendome El Alma	Grupo Límite	Tejano, Norteno, Cumbia	"El Principe" "Solo Contigo" "Juguete"	Polydor
29	A Que Vuelve	Gisselle	Merengue		BMG U.S. Latin, MC Records, RCA
29	Destino	Lizza Lamb			Ariola International

==== November ====
Day	Title	Artist	Genre(s)	Singles	Label
5	Avalancha de Éxitos	Café Tacuba	Indie Rock	"Metamorfosis" "Alármala de Tos" "Como Te Extraño Mi Amor"	WEA
12	Yo Quiero Cantar	Tito Nieves	Salsa		RMM Records
13	En Concierto, Vol. 1	Los Temerarios	Cumbia		FonoVisa
19	Sentimientos	Charlie Zaa	Ballad, Bolero		Sonolux, CBS/Sony, Sonolux
19	Tango	Julio Iglesias	Ballad, Vocal, Tango		Columbia, Sony Discos
19	Humildemente	Tito Rojas	Salsa		Musical Productions

==== December ====
Day	Title	Artist	Genre(s)	Singles	Label
3	Mœnia	Mœnia	House, Synth-Pop		MCA Records
10	Frevoador	Zé Ramalho	MPB		Columbia
17	Luna Nueva	Diego Torres	Vocal		BMG U.S. Latin

=== Unknown date ===
Title	Artist	Genre(s)	Singles	Label
Un Millón de Rosas	La Mafia	Cumbia, Tejano	"Yo Te Amaré" "Mejores Que Ella" "Vente"	Sony Discos
Opium	Ottmar Liebert	New Age, Flamenco, Downtempo		Epic
En Busca Del Amor	Álvaro Torres	Ballad		EMI Latin
Yo vengo aquí	Compay Segundo	Son, Bolero, Guajira		Gasa, NSL
Portraits of Cuba	Paquito D'Rivera	Latin Jazz	"La Bella Cubana" "Mariana"	Chesky Records
Ay Amor	Ana Bárbara		"Ya No Te Creo Nada" "No Llorare"	FonoVisa
Macarena Non Stop	Los del Río	House, Latin	"Macarena" "Pura Carroceria"	BMG U.S. Latin
En Pleno Vuelo	Marco Antonio Solís	Ballad		FonoVisa
Mazz Mariachi Y Tradicion	Mazz			EMI Latin
Nada Es Igual...	Luis Miguel	Bachata, Ballad		WEA Latina
Planeta Paulina	Paulina Rubio	Latin, Euro House, Synth-Pop		EMI Latin
Juntos Para Siempre	Los Mismos	Norteno, Tejano		EMI Latin
Sueño y Realidad (1996)	Grupo Mojado			FonoVisa
Mi Corazón es Tuyo	Graciela Beltrán	Banda		EMI Latin
The Latin Side of John Coltrane	Conrad Herwig	Latin Jazz	"Afro Blue" "Impressions"	Astor Place
Auténtico	Manny Manuel	Salsa, Merengue	"Y Sé Que Vas a Llorar" "En Este Momento"	Merengazo Records
De Buenas Raices	Michael Salgado	Norteno, Tejano		Joey International
Esencia	Gilberto Santa Rosa	Salsa	"No Quiero Na' Regala'o" "Esas Lágrimas" "Yo No Te Pido"	Sony Tropical
Está de Moda	Grupo Manía	Merengue, Reggaeton	"La Condena" "A Que Te Pego Mi Mania" "Linda Eh"	Sony Tropical
9 Luas	Os Paralamas do Sucesso			EMI
Nativa Geranio	Nativa Geranio	Ska, Reggae		Garrobo Records
Babel	Santa Sabina	Alternative Rock		BMG Bertelsmann De Mexico, S.A. De C.V., Culebra
¿Quién mató a Gaete?	Mauricio Redolés	Pachanga, Alternative Rock, Folk Rock		Krater

== Best-selling records ==
=== Best-selling albums ===
The following is a list of the top 10 best-selling Latin albums in the United States in 1996, according to Billboard.

Rank	Album	Artist
1	Dreaming of You	Selena
2	Macarena Mix	Various artists
3	Enrique Iglesias	Enrique Iglesias
4	The Best of the Gipsy Kings	Gipsy Kings
5	Macarena Non Stop	Los del Río
6	Abriendo Puertas	Gloria Estefan
7	El Concierto	Luis Miguel
8	Nada Es Igual...	Luis Miguel
9	Amor Prohibido	Selena
10	Tierra Gitana	Gipsy Kings

=== Best-performing songs ===
The following is a list of the top 10 best-performing Latin songs in the United States in 1996, according to Billboard.

Rank	Single	Artist
1	"Un Millón de Rosas"	La Mafia
2	"Amor"	Cristian Castro
3	"Por Amarte"	Enrique Iglesias
4	"Que Pena Me Das"	Marco Antonio Solís
5	"Como Te Extraño"	Pete Astudillo
6	"Si Tú Te Vas"	Enrique Iglesias
7	"No Te Vayas"	Intocable
8	"Amarte a Tí"	Cristian Castro
9	"No Llores Por Mí"	Enrique Iglesias
10	"Te Aprovechas"	Grupo Limite

== Births ==
- February 3 – Luis Coronel, Mexican-American banda singer
- June 24 – Duki, Argentine rapper
- June 25 – Lele Pons, Venezuelan-American pop singer

== Deaths ==
- February 13 – Rosamel Araya, Chilean bolero singer
- March 24 – Lola Beltrán, Mexican ranchera singer and actress
- September 7 – Gilda, Argentine cumbia singer
- October 11 – Renato Russo, founder and former lead singer of Brazilian rock band Legião Urbana
