= By Request (Boyzone album) =

Compilation album by Boyzone
- Released: 31 May 1999
- Recorded: 1994–1999
- Genre: Pop
- Length: 73:02
- Label: Universal
- Producers: Michael Mangini, Trevor Steel, Carl Sturken, Nigel Wright, Absolute, Jim Steinman, Ian Curnow, Mark Hudson, Steve Mac

Boyzone chronology
Where We Belong (1998)	By Request (1999)	Ballads – The Love Song Collection (2003)

Singles from By Request
- 1. "When the Going Gets Tough" Released: 1 March 1999; 2. "You Needed Me" Released: 10 May 1999; 3. "Everyday I Love You" Released: 22 November 1999 (Asian special edition only)

Professional ratings
Review scores
Source	Rating
AllMusic	3/5 stars

By Request is the first greatest hits album by the Irish boy band Boyzone. It was released on 31 May 1999 by Universal. The album is their best-selling release to date, with sales of over 4 million copies worldwide.

== Background ==
The album contains nearly all of the band's singles since the start of their career in 1994. Singles not included are the Irish-only single "Working My Way Back to You" and the Japanese only-single "Believe in Me". The American-only single "Mystical Experience", appears as a bonus track on the Australian release, "Te Garder Pres De Moi", appears as a bonus track on the French release, and "Everyday I Love You" only appears on the Asian release of the album. The latter was released as a single in the United Kingdom in December 1999, despite not being included on the UK edition of the album. The album also features Ronan Keating's first solo outing, "When You Say Nothing at All", and three tracks only previously issued on the American version of Where We Belong.

The album was released on 31 May 1999 via Universal and was preceded by the single "When the Going Gets Tough", which was released on 1 March 1999 as the official Comic Relief single for that year. The album was the second best selling album of the year in Britain, spending nine weeks atop the UK Album Chart. It was certified 6× Platinum, selling 1,814,966 copies in the UK alone.

== Track listing ==
No.	Title	Writer(s)	Producer(s)	Length
1.	"I Love the Way You Love Me" (from Where We Belong)	Victoria Shaw, Chuck Cannon	Steve Mac	4:06
2.	"No Matter What" (from Where We Belong)	Andrew Lloyd Webber, Jim Steinman	Webber, Steinman, Nigel Wright	4:32
3.	"All That I Need" (from Where We Belong)	Evan Rogers, Carl Sturken	Rogers, Sturken	3:42
4.	"Baby Can I Hold You" (from Where We Belong)	Tracy Chapman	Stephen Lipson	3:15
5.	"Picture of You" (from A Different Beat)	Ronan Keating, Eliot Kennedy, Andy Watkins, Paul Wilson	Absolute	3:28
6.	"Isn't It a Wonder" (from A Different Beat)	Keating, Ray Hedges, Martin Brannigan	Ray Hedges	3:30
7.	"A Different Beat" (from A Different Beat)	Keating, Hedges, Brannigan, Keith Duffy, Shane Lynch, Stephen Gately	Hedges	4:10
8.	"Words" (from A Different Beat)	Barry Gibb, Robin Gibb, Maurice Gibb	Phil Harding, Ian Curnow	3:55
9.	"Father and Son" (from Said and Done)	Cat Stevens	Hedges	2:56
10.	"So Good" (from Said and Done)	Keating, Hedges, Brannigan, Duffy, Mikey Graham, Lynch, Gately	Hedges	3:04
11.	"Coming Home Now" (from Said and Done)	Keating, Duffy, Graham, Lynch, Gately	Hedges	3:47
12.	"Key to My Life" (from Said and Done)	Keating, Hedges, Brannigan, Graham, Gately	Hedges	3:45
13.	"Love Me for a Reason" (from Said and Done)	David Jones, Johnny Bristol, Wade Brown	Hedges	3:39
14.	"When the Going Gets Tough" (previously unreleased)	Wayne Anton Brathwaite, Barry James Eastmond, Mutt Lange, Billy Ocean	Mac	4:07
15.	"You Needed Me" (previously unreleased)	Randy Goodrum	Mac	3:14
16.	"When You Say Nothing at All" (previously unreleased)	Paul Overstreet, Don Schlitz	Lipson	4:18
17.	"All the Time in the World" (previously unreleased)	Desmond Child, Damon Robbins, Victoria Stephenson	Michael Mangini	4:15
18.	"I'll Never Not Need You" (B-side to "When the Going Gets Tough" single)	Diane Warren	Mangini	4:13
19.	"So They Told Me" (previously unreleased)	Steven Greenberg, Mark Hudson	Mangini	3:28

French bonus track
No.	Title	Writer(s)	Producer(s)	Length
18.	"Te Garder Pres De Moi" (featuring Alliage)	Denny Randell, Sandy Linzer	Steve Mac	3:58

Asian special edition bonus disc
No.	Title	Writer(s)	Producer(s)	Length
1.	"Everyday I Love You"	Gary Baker, Frank Myers, Jerry Williams	Stephen Lipson	4:04
2.	"Will I Ever See You"	Stephen Gately, Noel, Jerry Meehan, Michael Morrison	Jerry Meehan	4:36
3.	"No Matter"	Keith Duffy, Hedges, Brannigan, Tracy Ackerman, John Caine	Ray Hedges	3:58

Australian deluxe edition bonus disc
No.	Title	Writer(s)	Producer(s)	Length
1.	"I've Got You"	Mikey Graham, Hedges, Brannigan	Ray Hedges	3:45
2.	"Let the Message Run Free"	Keating, Hedges, Brannigan, Graham, Gately	Ray Hedges	5:03
3.	"Get Up and Get Over"	Keating, Hedges, Brannigan, Graham	Ray Hedges	3:14
4.	"Mystical Experience"	Chein García-Alonso	Ray Hedges	4:12

By Request: The B-Sides EP
No.	Title	Writer(s)	Producer(s)	Length
1.	"What a Wonderful World" (Alison Moyet featuring Boyzone)	Bob Thiele, George David Weiss	Steve Mac	4:00
2.	"Love Can Build a Bridge" (featuring the Comic Relief Supporters)	John Barlow Jarvis, Naomi Judd, Paul Overstreet	Stephen Lipson	3:59
3.	"Words Can't Describe"	Keating, Hedges, Brannigan	Ray Hedges	3:33
4.	"Too Late Tonight"	Keating, Hedges, Brannigan	Ray Hedges	4:01

== Personnel ==
- Boyzone – vocals
- Michael Mangini – guitar, producer
- James McNally – accordion, whistle
- Ann Morfee – violin
- Steve Morris – violin
- Tessa Niles – background vocals
- Graeme Perkins – organizer
- Audrey Riley – cello
- Trevor Steel – programming, producer
- Miriam Stockley – background vocals
- Carl Sturken – arranger, producer
- Philip Todd – saxophone
- Peter-John Vettese – keyboards
- Warren Wiebe – background vocals
- Gavyn Wright – string director
- Nigel Wright – keyboards, producer
- Guy Barker – trumpet
- Clare Finnimore – viola
- Matt Howe – mix engineer
- Gillian Kent – violin
- Michael Hart Thompson – guitar
- Jeremy Wheatley – mix engineer
- Andy Caine – background vocals
- Clare Thompson – violin
- Bruce White – viola
- John Matthews – background vocals
- Andy Earl – photography
- Alex Black – assistant engineer
- Tim Willis – assistant engineer
- Ben Allen – guitar
- John R. Angier – keyboards
- Emma Black – cello
- Deborah Widdup – violin
- Nastee – DJ
- Anna Hemery – violin
- Wayne Hector – background vocals, vocal arrangement
- Yvonne John Lewis – background vocals
- Absolute – Producer, mix engineer
- Richard George – violin
- Skoti-Alain Elliot – bass, programming, track engineer
- Laura Melhuish – violin
- Orla Quirke – design, direction
- Jim Steinman – producer, executive producer
- Paul Martin – viola
- Tracie Ackerman – background vocals
- Tom Lord-Alge – mix engineer
- Andy Bradfield – remixing
- Nick Cooper – cello
- Ian Curnow – producer
- Danny Grant – keyboards
- Sue Dench – viola
- Andy Duncan – drums
- Simon Franglen – keyboards, engineer, programming
- Scott Gordon – vocal engineer
- Mark Hudson – vocal arrangement, vocal producer
- Eric Lijestrand – digital editing
- Steve Lipson – bass, producer, programming, mandolin
- Danny Foy – Guitar

== Charts ==
=== Weekly charts ===
Chart (1999)	Peak position
Australian Albums (ARIA)	3
Austrian Albums (Ö3 Austria)	4
Belgian Albums (Ultratop Flanders)	1
Belgian Albums (Ultratop Wallonia)	15
Canadian Albums (RPM)	35
Danish Albums (Hitlisten)	1
Dutch Albums (Album Top 100)	3
Estonian Albums (Eesti Top 10)	1
European Albums Chart	2
Finnish Albums (Suomen virallinen lista)	19
French Albums (SNEP)	18
German Albums (Offizielle Top 100)	4
Hungarian Albums (MAHASZ)	21
Icelandic Albums (Tónlist)	1
Irish Albums (IRMA)	1
Italian Albums (FIMI)	16
Italian Albums (Musica e Dischi)	21
Malaysian Albums (IFPI)	2
New Zealand Albums (RMNZ)	1
Norwegian Albums (VG-lista)	1
Portuguese Albums (AFP)	8
Scottish Albums (OCC)	1
Singapore Albums (SPVA)	1
Swedish Albums (Sverigetopplistan)	4
Swiss Albums (Schweizer Hitparade)	5
Taiwanese Albums (IFPI)	1
UK Albums (Official Charts)	1

=== Year-end charts ===
Chart (1999)	Position
Australian Albums (ARIA)	50
Austrian Albums (Ö3 Austria)	45
Belgian Albums (Ultratop Flanders)	9
Belgian Albums (Ultratop Wallonia)	66
Dutch Albums (Album Top 100)	13
European Albums (Eurochart Hot 100)	14
German Albums (Offizielle Top 100)	37
New Zealand Albums (RIANZ)	3
Norwegian Albums (VG-lista)	2
Swedish Albums (Sverigetopplistan)	14
UK Albums (OCC)	2

Chart (2000)	Position
UK Albums (OCC)	69

=== Decade-end charts ===
Chart (1990–1999)	Peak position
UK Albums (OCC)	38

== Certifications and sales ==
Region	Certification	Certified units/sales
Australia (ARIA)	Platinum	70,000^{^}
Belgium (BRMA)	Platinum	50,000^{*}
Canada (Music Canada)	Gold	50,000^{^}
Denmark (IFPI Danmark)	2× Platinum	100,000^{^}
Germany (BVMI)	Gold	250,000^{^}
Netherlands (NVPI)	Platinum	100,000^{^}
New Zealand (RMNZ)	7× Platinum	105,000^{^}
Norway (IFPI Norway)	2× Platinum	111,000
Sweden (GLF)	Platinum	80,000^{^}
Switzerland (IFPI Switzerland)	Gold	25,000^{^}
United Kingdom (BPI)	6× Platinum	1,814,966
Summaries
Europe (IFPI)	3× Platinum	3,000,000^{*}
^{*} Sales figures based on certification alone.^{^} Shipments figures based on certification alone.
