= Ballads – The Love Song Collection =

Compilation album by Boyzone
- Released: 17 March 2003
- Recorded: 1994–1999
- Genre: Pop
- Length: 67:08
- Label: Universal
- Producers: Mike Mangini, Trevor Steel, Carl Sturken, Nigel Wright, Absolute, Jim Steinman, Ian Curnow, Mark Hudson, Steve Mac

Boyzone chronology
By Request (1999)	Ballads – The Love Song Collection (2003)	Key to My Life: Collection (2006)

Ballads – The Love Song Collection is the second compilation album released by Irish boyband Boyzone. The album contains a selection of material recorded between 1994 and 1999, as well as the previously unreleased recording, "Your Song". The album was released on 17 March 2003, under Universal Records. The album was certified Gold in the UK. Asian copies of the album also came packaged with a bonus VCD, which includes a selection of the group's music videos, alongside the previously unreleased video for "And I" selling 150,000 copies.

== Track listing ==
- United Kingdom
1. "No Matter What" - 4:33
2. "I Love the Way You Love Me" - 3:47
3. "Everyday I Love You" - 3:30
4. "Baby Can I Hold You" - 3:13
5. "Words" - 4:01
6. "Mystical Experience" - 4:09
7. "All That I Need" - 3:39
8. "Coming Home Now" - 3:44
9. "Father And Son" - 2:47
10. "Ben" - 2:47
11. "Love Me for a Reason" - 3:38
12. "Isn't It a Wonder" - 3:44
13. "Paradise" - 3:32
14. "You Needed Me" - 3:28
15. "Don't Stop Looking For Love" - 4:19
16. "Key to My Life" - 3:48
17. "And I" - 4:02
18. "Your Song" - 4:00
19. "No Matter What" (Video) - 4:33
- United States
1. "And I" - 4:02
2. "Your Song" - 4:00
3. "No Matter What" - 4:33
4. "I Love the Way You Love Me" - 3:47
5. "Everyday I Love You" - 3:30
6. "Baby Can I Hold You" - 3:13
7. "Words" - 4:01
8. "Mystical Experience" - 4:09
9. "All That I Need" - 3:39
10. "Coming Home Now" - 3:44
11. "Father And Son" - 2:47
12. "Ben" - 2:47
13. "Love Me for a Reason" - 3:38
14. "Isn't It a Wonder" - 3:44
15. "Paradise" - 3:32
16. "You Needed Me" - 3:28
17. "Don't Stop Looking For Love" - 4:19
18. "Key to My Life" - 3:48
19. "Should Be Missing You Now" - 3:46
- Asia

Disc One

1. "And I" - 4:02
2. "Your Song" - 4:00
3. "No Matter What" - 4:33
4. "I Love the Way You Love Me" - 3:47
5. "Everyday I Love You" - 3:30
6. "Baby Can I Hold You" - 3:13
7. "Words" - 4:01
8. "Mystical Experience" - 4:09
9. "All That I Need" - 3:39
10. "Coming Home Now" - 3:44
11. "Father And Son" - 2:47
12. "Ben" - 2:47
13. "Love Me for a Reason" - 3:38
14. "Isn't It a Wonder" - 3:44
15. "Paradise" - 3:32
16. "You Needed Me" - 3:28
17. "Don't Stop Looking For Love" - 4:19
18. "Key to My Life" - 3:48
19. "Greetings & Message From Boyzone" / "Should Be Missing You Now" - 6:48 (Hidden Track)

Disc Two

1. "And I" (Video)
2. "Everyday I Love You" (Video)
3. "Love Me for a Reason" (Video)
4. "Words" (Video)
5. "No Matter What" (Video)
6. "1998 Interview"

== Charts ==
=== Weekly charts ===
Chart (2003)	Peak position
Danish Albums (Hitlisten)	5
Dutch Albums (Album Top 100)	63
European Albums Chart	22
Irish Albums (IRMA)	50
German Albums (Offizielle Top 100)	88
Norwegian Albums (VG-lista)	6
Scottish Albums (Official Charts)	6
UK Albums (Official Charts)	6

=== Year-end charts ===
Chart (2003)	Position
UK Albums (OCC)	118

== Certifications ==
Region	Certification	Certified units/sales
United Kingdom (BPI)	Gold	100,000^{^}
^{^} Shipments figures based on certification alone.

== Credits ==
- Boyzone – vocals
- Mike Mangini – guitar, producer
- James McNally – Accordion, Whistle
- Ann Morfee – Violin
- Steve Morris – Violin
- Tessa Niles – Background Vocals
- Graeme Perkins – Organizer
- Audrey Riley – Cello
- Trevor Steel – Programming, Producer
- Miriam Stockley – Background Vocals
- Carl Sturken – Arranger, Producer
- Philip Todd – Saxophone
- Peter-John Vettese – keyboards
- Warren Wiebe – Background Vocals
- Gavyn Wright – String Director
- Nigel Wright – keyboards, producer
- Guy Baker – Trumpet
- Clare Finnimore – Viola
- Matt Howe – Mix engineer
- Gillian Kent – Violin
- Michael Hart Thompson – guitar
- Jeremy Wheatley – Mix engineer
- Andy Caine – Background Vocals
- Clare Thompson – Violin
- Bruce White – Viola
- John Matthews – Background Vocals
- Andy Earl – Photography
- Alex Black – Assistant Engineer
- Tim Willis – assistant engineer
- Ben Allen – guitar
- John R. Angier – keyboards
- Emma Black – Cello
- Deborah Widdup – Violin
- Nastee – DJ
- Anna Hemery – Violin
- Wayne Hector – Background Vocals, Vocal Arrangement
- Yvonne John Lewis – Background Vocals
- Absolute – producer, Mix engineer
- Richard George – Violin
- Skoti-Alain Elliot – bass, programming, Track Engineer
- Laura Melhuish – Violin
- Orla Quirke – design, Direction
- Jim Steinman – producer, executive producer
- Paul Martin – Viola
- Tracie Ackerman – Background Vocals
- Tom Lord-Alge – Mix engineer
- Andy Bradfield – remixing
- Nick Cooper – Cello
- Ian Curnow – producer
- Danny G. – keyboards
- Sue Dench – Viola
- Andy Duncan – drums
- Simon Franglen – keyboards, engineer, programming
- Scott Gordon – vocal engineer
- Mark Hudson – Vocal Arrangement, Vocal Producer
- Eric Lijestrand – Digital Editing
- Steve Lipson – bass, producer, programming, Mandolin
