= Premio Lo Nuestro 1996 =

Latin Music awards show

8th Lo Nuestro Awards
- Date: Thursday, May 9, 1996
- Site: James L. Knight Center; Miami, Florida, USA
- Hosted by: Raúl Velasco

Highlights
- Most awards: Gloria Estefan (4)
- Most nominations: Marco Antonio Solís (5)

The 8th Lo Nuestro Awards ceremony, presented by Univision honoring the best Latin music of 1995 and 1996 took place on May 9, 1996, at a live presentation held at the James L. Knight Center in Miami, Florida. The ceremony was broadcast in the United States and Latin America by Univision.

During the ceremony, nineteen categories were presented. Winners were announced at the live event and included Mexican singer-songwriter Marco Antonio Solís receiving four competitive awards and the special recognition "Excellence Award". Other multiple winners were Cuban-American performer Gloria Estefan with four awards, Spanish singer Enrique Iglesias with three, and Tejano singer Pete Astudillo with two. Iglesias won the award for "Pop Album of the Year," Mexican singer-songwriter Juan Gabriel earned the award for "Regional Mexican Album of the Year," and Estefan won for "Tropical/Salsa Album of the Year." A special tribute was given to Tejano singer Selena and Cuban performer Israel "Cachao" López.

== Background ==
In 1989, the Lo Nuestro Awards were established by Univision, to recognize the most talented performers of Latin music. The nominees and winners were selected by a voting poll conducted among program directors of Spanish-language radio stations in the United States and the results were tabulated and certified by the accounting firm Arthur Andersen. The categories included are for the Pop, Tropical/Salsa, Regional Mexican and Music Video. The trophy awarded is shaped like a treble clef. The 8th Lo Nuestro Awards ceremony was held on May 7, 1996, in a live presentation held at the James L. Knight Center in Miami, Florida. The ceremony was broadcast in the United States and Latin America by Univision.

== Winners and nominees ==
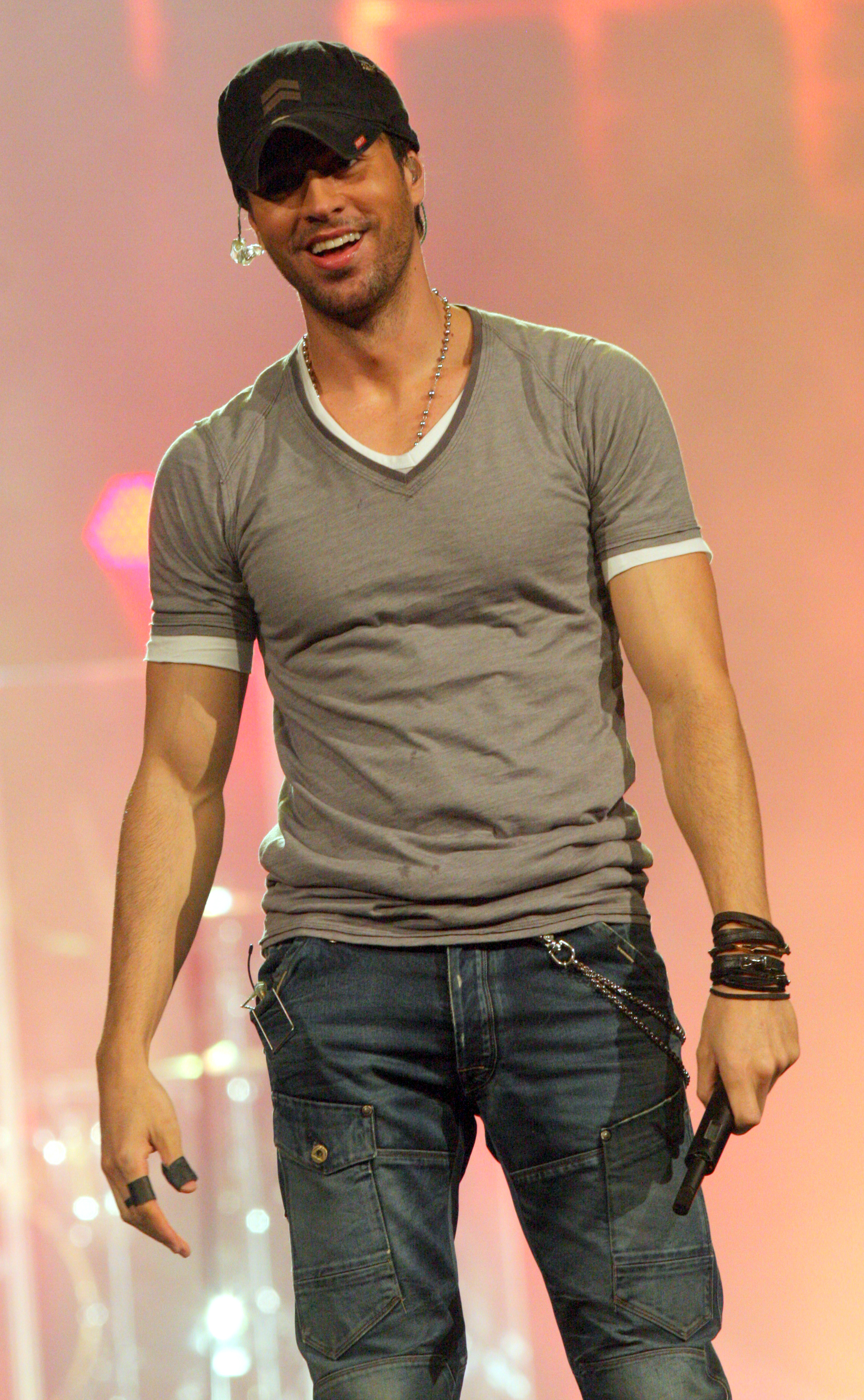
Enrique Iglesias won three Lo Nuestro Awards in 1996, including Pop Album of the Year, which also won the Grammy Award.

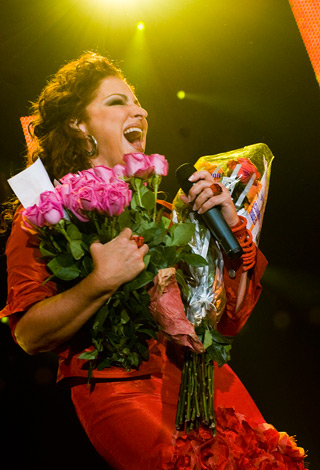
Cuban singer Gloria Estefan was the most nominated female performer and won all her nominations, including Pop and Tropical/Salsa Female Artist of the Year.

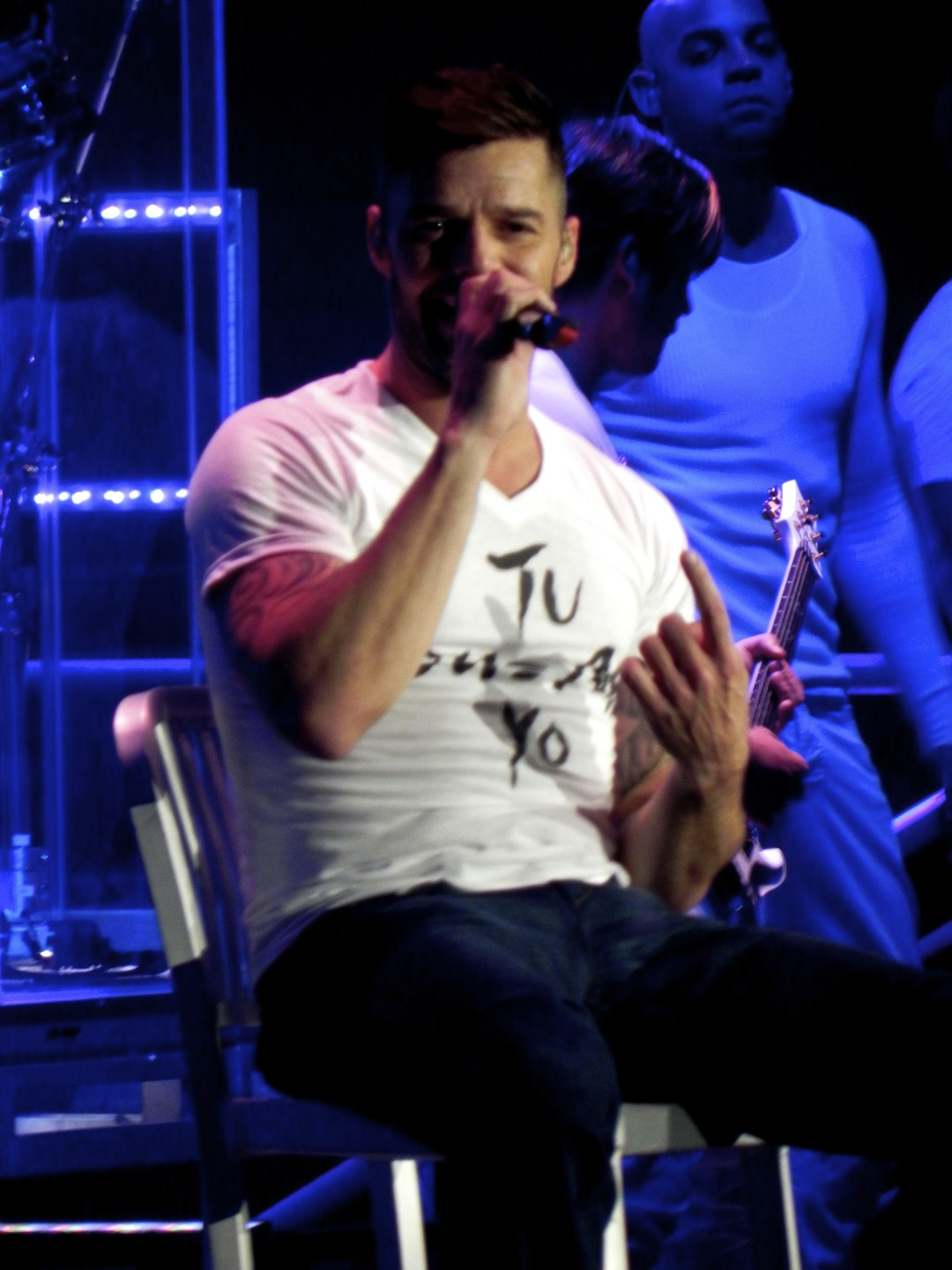
Puerto-Rican American singer Ricky Martin received the Video of the Year award for "Te Extraño, Te Olvido, Te Amo".

Winners were announced before the live audience during the ceremony. Mexican singer-songwriter Marco Antonio Solís was the most nominated performer, with five nominations which resulted in four wins shared with his band Los Bukis, which included both Pop and Regional Group of the Year. Spanish singer Enrique Iglesias was awarded "Pop Album of the Year", "New Pop Artist of the Year", and "Pop Song of the Year" with "Si Tú Te Vas". Iglesias debut album also earned the Grammy Award for Best Latin Pop Album. Cuban-American singer Gloria Estefan won all her four nominations. Two songs nominated for Pop Song of the Year reached number one at the Billboard Top Latin Songs chart: Iglesias "Si Tú Te Vas" and "Si Nos Dejan" by Mexican singer Luis Miguel; "Abriendo Puertas" by Estefan was named "Tropical/Salsa Song of the Year" and also reached number one in the chart. Puerto-Rican American performer Ricky Martin earned the accolade for Best Music Video for "Te Extraño, Te Olvido, Te Amo".

Dominican band Ilegales and American singer Marc Anthony earned one award each at the Tropical/Salsa field; Ilegales won for "New Artist", while Anthony received "Male Singer of the Year". In the Regional Mexican field, Tejano performer Pete Astudillo dominated the field after winning "New Artist" and "Song of the Year" for his Tribute to late singer Selena titled "Como Te Extraño"; Mexican pop singer Cristian Castro received the award for "Male Singer of the Year", fellow Mexican singer-songwriter Juan Gabriel with "El México Que Se Nos Fue" was named "Album of the Year".

Winners and nominees of the 8th Annual Lo Nuestro Awards (winners listed first)
Pop Album of the Year	Pop Song of the Year
Enrique Iglesias – Enrique Iglesias; Julio Iglesias – La Carretera; Luis Miguel – El Concierto; Marco Antonio Solís y Los Bukis – Por Amor a Mi Pueblo; Thalía – En Éxtasis	Enrique Iglesias – "Si Tú Te Vas" (written by Iglesias and Roberto Morales); Cristian – "Vuélveme a Querer" (written by Jorge Avendaño Lührs); José José – "Llora Corazón" (written by Roberto Livi and Rafael Ferro); Luis Miguel – "Si Nos Dejan" (written by José Alfredo Jiménez); Thalía – "Piel Morena" (written by Kike Santander)
Male Artist of the Year, Pop	Female Artist of the Year, Pop
Luis Miguel; Cristian; Enrique Iglesias; Pedro Fernández	Gloria Estefan; Rocío Dúrcal; Lucero; Thalía
Pop Group of the Year	New Pop Artist of the Year
Marco Antonio Solís and Los Bukis; Barrio Boyzz; Bronco; Donato y Estéfano	Enrique Iglesias; Donato y Estéfano; Millie; Thalía
Regional Mexican Album of the Year	Regional Mexican Song of the Year
Juan Gabriel – El México Que Se Nos Fue; Bronco – Rompiendo Barreras; Ana Gabriel – Joyas de Dos Siglos; Pedro Fernández – Mi Forma de Sentir; Vicente Fernández – Aunque Me Duela el Alma	Pete Astudillo – "Como Te Extraño" (written by Astudillo, A.B. Quintanilla III and José Ojeda); Juan Gabriel – "Canción 187" (written by Gabriel); Los Tigres del Norte – "Golpes en El Corazón" (written by Roberto Valencia); Marco Antonio Solís y Los Bukis – "Será Mejor Que Te Vayas" (written by Solís); Liberación – "Enamorado de Un Fantasma" (written by Roberto Livi)
Male Artist of the Year, Regional Mexican	Female Artist of the Year, Regional Mexican
Cristian; Pete Astudillo; Vicente Fernández; Juan Gabriel	Ana Bárbara; Ana Gabriel; Graciela Beltrán; Elsa García
Regional Mexican Group of the Year	New Regional Mexican Artist of the Year
La Mafia (tie); Marco Antonio Solís y Los Bukis (tie); Bronco; Liberación	Pete Astudillo; Los Dinnos; Los Rehenes; Los Tiranos del Norte
Tropical/Salsa Album of the Year	Tropical/Salsa Song of the Year
Gloria Estefan – Abriendo Puertas; Marc Anthony – Todo a Su Tiempo; Los Hermanos Rosario – Los Dueños del Swing; Olga Tañón – Éxitos y Más; Carlos Vives – La Tierra del Olvido	Gloria Estefan – "Abriendo Puertas" (written by Kike Santander); El Gran Combo – "Amor de Playa" (written by Ramon Rodríguez); Marc Anthony – "Te Conozco Bien" (written by Omar Alfanno); Jerry Rivera – "Suave" (written by Kiko Cibrian and Orlando Castro); Tito Rojas – "Esperándote" (written by Alicia Baroni)
Male Artist of the Year, Tropical/Salsa	Female Artist of the Year, Tropical/Salsa
Marc Anthony; Giro; Jerry Rivera; Gilberto Santa Rosa	Gloria Estefan; Jailene Cintrón; La India; Olga Tañón
Tropical/Salsa Group of the Year	New Tropical/Salsa Artist of the Year
Los del Río; Los Hermanos Rosario; El Gran Combo; Grupo Niche	Ilegales; Jailene Cintrón; Manny Manuel; Mayra Mayra
Video of the Year
Ricky Martin – "Te Extraño, Te Olvido, Te Amo"; Miguel Bosé – "Tesoro (Pudo Ser Tu Nombre...)"; Emilio Navaira – "No es el Fin del Mundo"; Alejandro Fernández – "Como Quien Pierde Una Estrella"; Fobia – "Hipnótizame"; Enrique Iglesias – "Experiencia Religiosa"; Lucero – "Palabras"; Alejandro Sanz – "La Fuerza del Corazón"; Diego Torres – "Penélope"; Carlos Vives – "La Tierra del Olvido"

== Special awards ==
- Lo Nuestro Excellence Award: Marco Antonio Solís
- Special Tribute: Selena and Cachao

== See also ==
- 1995 in Latin music
- 1996 in Latin music
- Grammy Award for Best Latin Pop Album
- Grammy Award for Best Mexican/Mexican-American Album
- Grammy Award for Best Traditional Tropical Latin Album
