= Trapecista =

Single by Enrique Iglesias

from the album Enrique Iglesias
- Released: 16 September 1996
- Recorded: 1995
- Genre: Latin pop; pop rock
- Length: 4:27
- Label: Fonovisa
- Songwriter: Rafael Pérez-Botija
- Producer: Rafael Pérez-Botija

Enrique Iglesias singles chronology
"No Llores Por Mí" (1996)	"Trapecista" (1996)	"Enamorado Por Primera Vez" (1996)

Music video
- "Enrique Iglesias - Trapecista" on YouTube

"Trapecista" (English: Trapezist) is the fifth and last single released by Spanish singer-songwriter Enrique Iglesias from his eponymous debut studio album Enrique Iglesias (1995), It was released by Fonovisa on 16 September 1996 (see 1996 in music).

== Song information ==
The track was written and produced by Rafael Pérez-Botija, and became Iglesias's fifth consecutive chart topper in the U.S., a new record for Iglesias, breaking Selena's record with her album Amor Prohibido (1994) and Jon Secada's with his album Otro Día Más Sin Verte (1992), both releasing four number-one singles. The video for this single was directed by Jon Small who directed the videos for "Si Tú Te Vas" and "Experiencia Religiosa".

== Chart performance ==
The track debuted in the United States Billboard Hot Latin Tracks chart at number 13 on 16 November 1996, and rose to number 1 three weeks later, spending five weeks at the summit. The single spent ten weeks in the top ten.

Chart (1996/1997)	Peak position
U.S. Billboard Hot Latin Tracks	1
U.S. Billboard Latin Pop Airplay	2
U.S. Billboard Latin Regional Mexican Airplay	8
U.S. Billboard Latin Tropical/Salsa Airplay	19

== See also ==
- List of number-one Billboard Hot Latin Tracks of 1996
- List of number-one Billboard Hot Latin Tracks of 1997
