= A Different Beat =

A Different Beat may refer to:

- A Different Beat (Gary Moore album), 1999
- A Different Beat (Boyzone album), 1996
  - "A Different Beat" (song), 1996
- "A Different Beat", a 2013 song by Little Mix from Salute
