= Amarte a Ti =

1996 single by Cristian Castro

Single by Cristian

from the album El Deseo de Oír Tu Voz
- Released: 1996
- Recorded: 1995
- Studio: Old House Studios (New York City)
- Genre: Latin pop
- Length: 3:24
- Label: Melody
- Songwriter: Walter Arenzon · Daniel Freiberg
- Producer: Daniel Freiberg

Cristian singles chronology
"Amor" (1995)	"Amarte a Ti" (1996)	"No Puedo Arrancarte de Mi" (1996)

"Amarte a Ti" (English: Loving You) is a song written by Walter Arenzon and co-written and produced by Daniel Freiberg and performed by Mexican singer-songwriter Cristian Castro from his fourth studio El Deseo de Oír Tu Voz (1996). It was released as the second single from the album. It became his third number-one song on the Billboard Hot Latin Tracks chart and his sixth number-one on the Latin Pop Airplay chart. It was recognized as on the best-performing songs of the year at the 1997 BMI Awards. The song was later covered by Dominican Republic merengue band Sin Fronteras on their album Abriendo Caminos (1996) and recorded a music video for it.

== Charts ==
=== Weekly charts ===
Chart (1996)	Peak position
US Hot Latin Songs (Billboard)	1
US Latin Pop Airplay (Billboard)	1

=== Year-end charts ===
Chart (1996)	Position
US Hot Latin Songs (Billboard)	8
US Latin Pop Songs (Billboard)	2

== See also ==
- Billboard Top Latin Songs Year-End Chart
- List of number-one Billboard Hot Latin Tracks of 1996
- List of Billboard Latin Pop Airplay number ones of 1996
