= List of number-one Billboard Regional Mexican Songs of 1996 =

The Billboard Regional Mexican Songs chart ranks the best-performing Regional Mexican singles in the United States. Published weekly by Billboard magazine, it ranks the "most popular regional Mexican songs, ranked by radio airplay audience impressions as measured by Nielsen Music."

== Chart history ==
Key
†	Indicates number 1 on Billboard's year-end regional Mexican chart

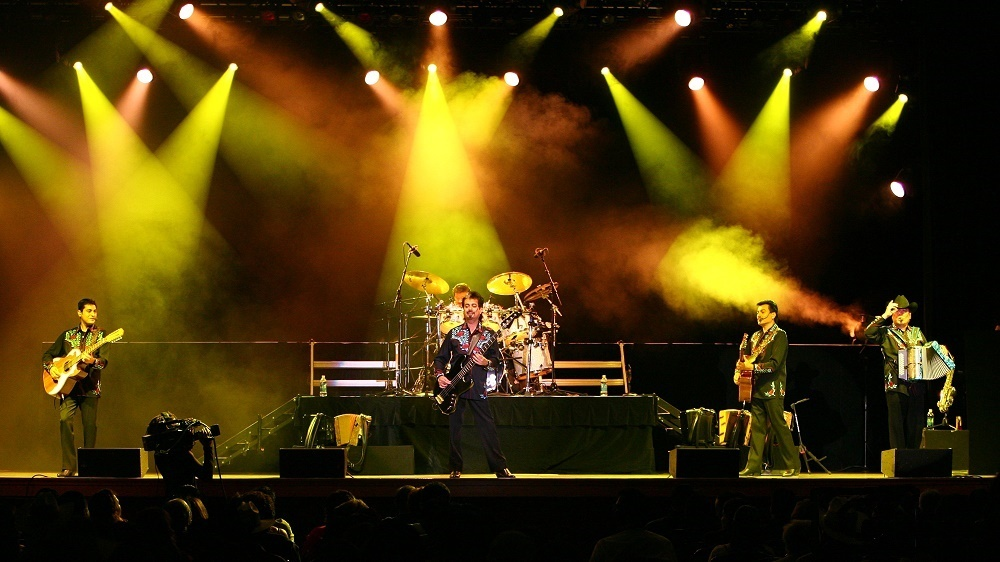
Norteño group Los Tigres del Norte earned three number-one songs in 1996.

Issue date	Song	Artist(s)	Ref.
January 6	"Cómo te extraño"	Pete Astudillo	
January 13	"Cómo te extraño"	Pete Astudillo	
January 20	"Cómo te extraño"	Pete Astudillo	
January 27	"Un millón de rosas" †	La Mafia	
February 3	"Un millón de rosas" †	La Mafia	
February 10	"Un millón de rosas" †	La Mafia	
February 17	"Un millón de rosas" †	La Mafia	
February 24	"Un millón de rosas" †	La Mafia	
March 2	"Un millón de rosas" †	La Mafia	
March 9	"Un millón de rosas" †	La Mafia	
March 16	"Un millón de rosas" †	La Mafia	
March 23	"Un millón de rosas" †	La Mafia	
March 30	"Un millón de rosas" †	La Mafia	
April 6	"Un millón de rosas" †	La Mafia	
April 13	"Un millón de rosas" †	La Mafia	
April 20	"Un millón de rosas" †	La Mafia	
April 27	"Un millón de rosas" †	La Mafia	
May 4	"El circo"	Los Tigres del Norte	
May 11	"El circo"	Los Tigres del Norte	
May 18	"El circo"	Los Tigres del Norte	
May 25	"El circo"	Los Tigres del Norte	
June 1	"El circo"	Los Tigres del Norte	
June 8	"El circo"	Los Tigres del Norte	
June 15	"El circo"	Los Tigres del Norte	
June 22	"El circo"	Los Tigres del Norte	
June 29	"El circo"	Los Tigres del Norte	
July 6	"El circo"	Los Tigres del Norte	
July 13	"No te vayas"	Intocable	
July 20	"Qué pena me das"	Marco Antonio Solís	
July 27	"Qué pena me das"	Marco Antonio Solís	
August 3	"Qué pena me das"	Marco Antonio Solís	
August 10	"Qué pena me das"	Marco Antonio Solís	
August 17	"Qué pena me das"	Marco Antonio Solís	
August 24	"Qué pena me das"	Marco Antonio Solís	
August 31	"Qué pena me das"	Marco Antonio Solís	
September 7	"Qué pena me das"	Marco Antonio Solís	
September 14	"Qué pena me das"	Marco Antonio Solís	
September 21	"Qué pena me das"	Marco Antonio Solís	
September 28	"Cuestión olvidada"	Los Tigres del Norte	
October 5	"Cuestión olvidada"	Los Tigres del Norte	
October 12	"Cuestión olvidada"	Los Tigres del Norte	
October 19	"El príncipe"	Grupo Límite	
October 26	"El príncipe"	Grupo Límite	
November 2	"El príncipe"	Grupo Límite	
November 9	"El príncipe"	Grupo Límite	
November 16	"El príncipe"	Grupo Límite	
November 23	"El príncipe"	Grupo Límite	
November 30	"El príncipe"	Grupo Límite	
December 7	"El príncipe"	Grupo Límite	
December 14	"No pude enamorarme más"	Los Tigres del Norte	
December 21	"No pude enamorarme más"	Los Tigres del Norte	
December 28	"Palomita blanca"	Michael Salgado	
