= Amor (Cristian Castro song) =

1995 single by Cristian Castro

Single by Cristian Castro

from the album El Deseo de Oír Tu Voz
- Released: November 1995
- Recorded: 1995; New York City
- Genre: Pop rock
- Length: 4:57
- Label: Melody
- Songwriter: Cristian Castro
- Producer: Daniel Freiberg

Cristian Castro singles chronology
"Vuelveme a Querer" (1995)	"Amor" (1995)	"Amarte a Ti" (1996)

Audio sample
- file; help

"Amor" (English: "Love") is a song written and performed by Mexican singer Cristian Castro and produced by Daniel Freiberg. It was released as the lead single for Castro's fourth studio album El Deseo de Oír Tu Voz in 1995 by Melody Records. It is an acoustic pop rock song in which the singer asks love to give him a chance. In the United States, it reached the summit of the Billboard Hot Latin Songs and spent 11 weeks at this position. In 1996, it ended as the second-best performing Latin song of the year in the country. "Amor" also reached number one on the Latin Pop Songs compiled by the same publication. A music video for "Amor" was filmed in Rome, Italy and directed by Castro, featuring the artist performing various stunts in the city.

== Background and music video ==
Following the release of his third studio album El Camino del Alma (1994), Cristian Castro took a hiatus from the music scene to study cinematography in New York City. By the end of 1995, Castro mentioned that he was finalizing material for his next studio album which he recorded in New York City. On 19 January 1996, he announced the name of his next album, El Deseo de Oír Tu Voz, which would be released in the same month. "Amor" was made available as the album's lead single in November 1995. An accompanying music video for the song was filmed in Rome, Italy and directed by Castro. It features Castro wearing a fedora and a long overcoat while performing various stunts such as riding a bicycle and a Vespa, aerobics, and singing a one-man band.

== Music and lyrics ==
"Amor" was written and composed by Castro and produced by Daniel Freiberg. Regarding the inspiration for the song, Castro explained in a 2011 interview with Billboard: "I wrote 'Amor' in New York when I was living there. I was feeling anxiety about love, something I’d been feeling for a long time. There was a certain amount of frustration, and desire to explore romantic themes. It was 1995. New York seemed like the best place to examine those feelings". He also elaborated that the lyrics in "Amor" are not about a woman, but "about asking love to give me a chance". Musically, the track is described by John Lannert of Billboard as "smooth acoustic rock", while the Democrat and Chronicle editor Manuel Rivera-Ortiz noted it features a "progressive pop-rock sound with a hint of country music rhythm".

== Reception ==
In the United States, "Amor" debuted at number three on the Billboard Hot Latin Songs chart on the week of 20 January 1996. It topped the chart two weeks later, replacing "Si Tú Te Vas" by Enrique Iglesias, and spent 11 consecutive weeks at this position until it was succeeded by Iglesias's song "Experiencia Religiosa. The track held the longest-running number-one song on the chart since Billboard began incorporating Nielsen Broadcast Data Systems in 1994 until the record was broken a year later by "Enamorado Por Primera Vez" by Iglesias. "Amor" ended 1996 as the second-best performing Latin song of the year in the country behind "Un Millón de Rosas" by La Mafia. The track also topped the Latin Pop Songs chart in the United States. In 2014, it was named the "Best Latin Love Song of All Time" by Judy Cantor-Navas of Billboard magazine.

== Charts ==
=== Weekly charts ===
Chart (1996)	Peak position
US Hot Latin Songs (Billboard)	1
US Latin Pop Airplay (Billboard)	1

=== Year-end charts ===
Chart (1996)	Position
US Hot Latin Songs (Billboard)	2
US Latin Pop Songs (Billboard)	5

=== All-time charts ===
Chart (2016)	Position
US Hot Latin Songs (Billboard)	45

== See also ==
- Billboard Top Latin Songs Year-End Chart
- List of number-one Billboard Hot Latin Tracks of 1996
- List of Billboard Latin Pop Airplay number ones of 1996
