= Pete Astudillo discography =

Pete Astudillo albums discography
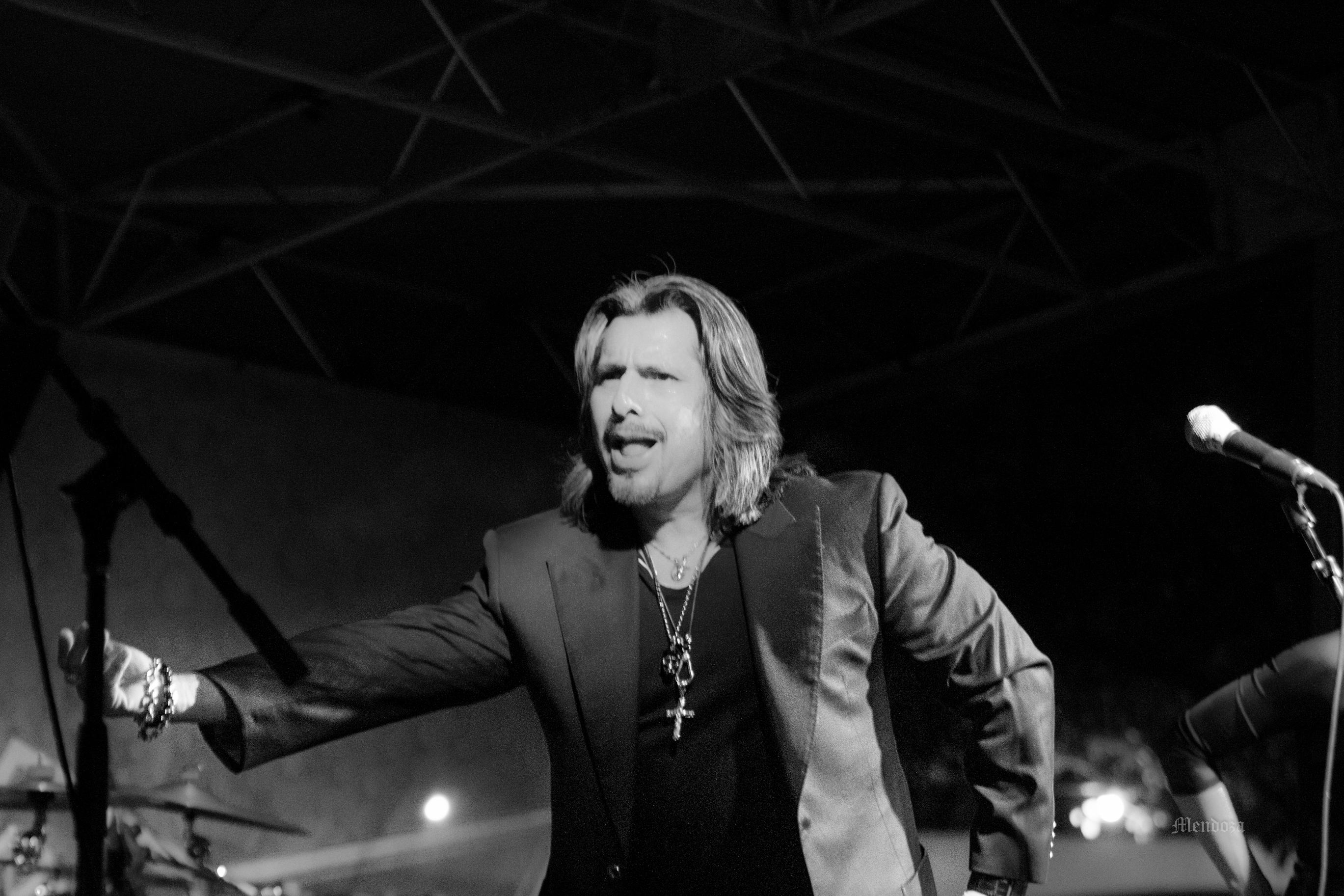
- Pete Astudillo during a concert in Laredo, Texas in 2016.
- Studio albums: 7
- Live albums: 1
- Compilation albums: 1

American singer Pete Astudillo has released seven studio albums, one live album, and one compilation album. Astudillo began his music career as lead vocalist for Los Bad Boyz with Joe Ojeda serving as the group's keyboardist. They both integrated into Selena y Los Dinos in 1988, while Astudillo composed songs for the group as well as harmonizing with lead vocalist Selena. Astudillo released his debut solo album, Entregate a Mi in January 1992, which was followed up with Como Nadie (1993). Astudillo signed with Q-Productions through distribution with EMI Latin. His most commercially successful album to date, Como Te Extrano (1995), peaked at number two in the United States Billboard Regional Mexican Albums chart and number six on the US Billboard Top Latin Albums chart. While Si Tu No Estas (1997) and ¿Dónde Estás Amor? (1999) failed to capitalize on the same commercial success as Como Te Extrano, Astudillo forged his own label, Peace Rock Records, and released his albums independently. Astudillo released El Rey del Ritmo (2001) through his label and after a stint as a rocker on Salvación (2013), Astudillo released Pete Astudillo and Tekno Mex - Live (2015) through Q-Productions.

== Studio albums ==
List of studio albums, with selected chart positions, sales and certifications
Title	Album details	Peak chart positions			Certifications	Sales
Title	Album details	US	US Latin	MEX Reg.	Certifications	Sales
Entregate a Mi	Released: January 1992; Label: EMI Latin; Format: cassette, CD	—	—	—		
Como Nadie	Released: 1993; Label: EMI Latin; Format: cassette, CD	—	—	—		
Como Te Extrano	Released: December 1995; Label: EMI Latin; Format: cassette, CD	—	6	2		
Si Tu No Estas	Released: 1997; Label: EMI Latin; Format: cassette, CD	—	37	—		
¿Dónde Estás Amor?	Released: April 20, 1999; Label: Q-Productions; Format: cassette, CD	—	—	—		
El Rey del Ritmo	Released: August 2001; Label: Peace Rock Records; Format: cassette, CD	—	—	—		
Salvación	Released: 2013; Label: Peace Rock Records; Format: CD	—	—	—		

== Live albums ==
List of studio albums, with selected chart positions, sales and certifications
Title	Album details	Peak chart positions			Certifications	Sales
Title	Album details	US	US Latin	MEX Reg.	Certifications	Sales
Pete Astudillo and Tekno Mex - Live	Released: 2015; Label: Q-Productions; Format: CD	—	—	—		

== Compilation albums ==
List of studio albums, with selected chart positions, sales and certifications
Title	Album details	Peak chart positions			Certifications	Sales
Title	Album details	US	US Latin	MEX Reg.	Certifications	Sales
Greatest Hits	Released: 2004; Label: Q-Productions; Format: CD	—	—	—		

== Works cited ==
- Anon. (December 12, 1995). "Top Latin Albums > December 12, 1995". Billboard.com. Archived from the original on March 14, 2024.
- Cabrera, Rene (March 27, 1992). "Quintanilla Accompanist Releases Solo LP". Corpus Christi Caller-Times – via Newspapers.com.
- Anon. (n.d.). "Pete Astudillo > Biography, Music & News". Billboard.
- Davis, Deborah (January 4, 1996). "A Tono / Abra los oidos al sonido del 96". El Norte (in Spanish). Gale A128476849 – via Gale Research.
- Lannert, John (November 25, 1995). "Hot Latin Songs > November 25, 1995". Billboard. Vol. 107, no. 47. p. 112.
- Maldonado, Vilma (July 22, 1994). "Artists Busy Touring, Releasing New Tejano Music". The Monitor – via Newspapers.com.
- Wener, Ben (April 15, 1999). "CD Spins". Arizona Republic – via Newspapers.com.
- Anon. (August 23, 2001). "Tejano Fusion". Corpus Christi Caller-Times – via Newspapers.com.
- Saldana, Hector (October 15, 2013). "Tejano artists take rock stage". Mysa.
- Anon. (2015). "Pete Astudillo and Tekno Mex - Live (Album)". Q-Productions. Archived from the original on March 20, 2024.
- Anon. (2004). "Pete Astudillo - Greatest Hits (CD)". Q-Productions. Archived from the original on March 20, 2024.
- Carrizales, Sylvia M. (March 1, 2024). "Pete Astudillo Discusses His Journey from Stardom with Selena to Solo Success and New Music". Tejano Nation. Archived from the original on March 14, 2024.
- Salas, Maria (March 31, 2020). "Selena's impact on Laredo remembered 25 years after her death". Laredo Morning Times. Archived from the original on March 14, 2024.
- Cabrera, Rene (August 24, 2001). "Rhythm King Finds Muscle". Corpus Christi Caller-Times – via Newspapers.com.
