= Si Tu No Estas =

Studio album by Pete Astudillo
- Released: May 20, 1997
- Studio: Q-Productions
- Genre: Latin pop; Tejano; Traditional Mexican
- Language: Spanish
- Label: EMI Latin
- Producer: A.B. Quintanilla

Pete Astudillo chronology
Como Te Extraño (1995)	Si Tu No Estas (1997)	¿Donde Estas Amor? (1999)

Si Tu No Estas (If You're Not Here) is the fourth studio album by American Tejano music singer-songwriter Pete Astudillo. The album peaked at number 37 on the US Billboard Top Latin Albums chart. The title track is a tribute song to Selena, who was shot and killed on March 31, 1995, this is the second tribute song for the singer following "Como Te Extraño" (1995). Astudillo was a backup dancer and singer for her group Selena y Los Dinos. The title track was intended for the 1997 film soundtrack of Selena, but was shelved. "Si Tu No Estas" was nominated for Song of the Year at the 1998 Tejano Music Awards, while "No Le Niego" was nominated for Tejano Crossover Song of the Year.

== Track listing ==
Credits adapted from the liner notes of Si Tu No Estas.

No.	Title	Writer(s)	Length
1.	"Si Tu No Estas"	A.B. Quintanilla, Pete Astudillo	4:01
2.	"¿Dime Por Que?"	Quintanilla, Astudillo	3:40
3.	"A Veces Se Me Olvida"	Astudillo	3:24
4.	"Cuando No Estoy Contigo"	Quintanilla, Astudillo, Joe Ojeda	3:22
5.	"No Lo Niego"	Astudillo	3:56
6.	"Sufriras"	Quintanilla, Astudillo	3:31
7.	"Problamente Ya"	Juan Gabriel	3:13
8.	"Anos Inolvidables"	Astudillo, Danny Fernandez	2:48
9.	"Estoy Enamorado"	Astudillo	3:01
10.	"Dale Duro"	Quintanilla, Astudillo	3:28

== Charts ==
Chart (1997)	Peak position
US Top Latin Albums (Billboard)	37

== See also ==
- 1997 in Latin music
- Latin American music in the United States

== Works cited ==
- Cazares, David (March 12, 1997). "Espanola-Palooza". South Florida Sun Sentinel – via Newspapers.com.
- "TTMA Announces Nominations for 18th Annual Show". Corpus Christi Caller-Times. January 26, 1998 – via Newspapers.com.
- "Billboard > Artist > Pete Astudillo > Top Latin Albums". Billboard.
- Astudillo, Pete (1997). Si Tu No Estas (Compact disc). Corpus Christi, Texas: EMI Latin.
