= One Kiss at a Time =

One Kiss at a Time

- "One Kiss at a Time", song by Boyzone from Key to My Life: Collection, Where We Belong (album), Love Me for a Reason – The Collection
- "One Kiss at a Time", song by Prince from Emancipation (Prince album)
