= El circo (song) =

Single by Los Tigres del Norte
- Language: Spanish
- English title: "The circus"
- Released: 1996
- Genre: Norteño, Corrido, Protest song
- Length: 2:47
- Label: Fonovisa
- Songwriter(s): Jesse Armenta

"El circo" ("The circus") is a 1996 song written by Jesse Armenta and recorded by Mexican group Los Tigres del Norte. The song was included in the album "Unidos para Siempre" and topped the US Billboard Hot Latin Songs and Regional Mexican Airplay charts in 1996.

== Composition and lyrics ==
"El circo" is a corrido and protest song written by Jesse Armenta, who had been working with Los Tigres del Norte for decades.

The lyrics describe two brothers, "Carlos" and "Raúl" (in reference to Carlos Salinas de Gortari, president of Mexico from 1988 to 1994, and his brother Raúl Salinas de Gortari), who form a "circus" (a drug cartel) and get rid of the other "circuses" in the country. After the brothers get wealthy, Raúl makes Carlos' money disappear (a reference to the Mexican peso crisis) and their circus ends. Raúl is jailed, while Carlos leaves the country, and the people are finally at peace, unless another circus arrives and the story repeats itself.

In 2013, Gustavo Orellana from the OC Weekly considered "El circo" as the second best song ever recorded by Los Tigres del Norte, and described that with the song "in exacting, sardonic fashion, Los Tigres detail how the Gortaris stole the 1988 election and enriched themselves in the process, leaving Mexico in ruins while fleeing for the banks of Switzerland and the extradition-free land of Ireland". Orellana also described the last lines of the song as prophetic, given that the PRI (the political party that governed Mexico from 1929 to 2000 and to which the Salinas brothers were affiliated) returned to power in 2012 with Enrique Peña Nieto as President of Mexico.

== Charts ==
Chart (1996)	Peak position
U.S. Billboard Hot Latin Tracks	1
U.S. Billboard Regional Mexican Airplay	1

== See also ==
- List of number-one Billboard Hot Latin Tracks of 1996
- List of number-one Billboard Regional Mexican Songs of 1996
