= El México Que Se Nos Fue =

Studio album by Juan Gabriel
- Released: 1995
- Recorded: 1994–1995
- Label: Sony BMG

Juan Gabriel chronology
Gracias por Esperar (1994)	El México Que Se Nos Fue (1995)	Juntos Otra Vez (Juan Gabriel and Rocío Dúrcal album) (1998)

El México Que Se Nos Fue ("The Mexico that got away from us") is the twenty-second studio album by Juan Gabriel, released in 1995. The album won the Lo Nuestro Award for Regional Mexican Album of the Year.

== Track listing ==
All tracks are written by Juan Gabriel.

No.	Title	Length
1.	"Cuando Estoy en el Campo"	3:47
2.	"El Hijo de Mi Compadre"	2:38
3.	"Mi Bendita Tierra"	3:33
4.	"Juan y Maria"	3:09
5.	"La Herencia"	3:07
6.	"El Palo"	3:10
7.	"Muerto en Vida"	3:31
8.	"El Recurso"	3:21
9.	"Cancion 187"	2:06
10.	"El México Que Se Nos Fue"	4:36

== Charts ==
Chart (1995)	Peak position
US Top Latin Albums (Billboard)	8
US Regional Mexican Albums (Billboard)	3

== Album certification ==
Region	Certification	Certified units/sales
United States (RIAA)	2× Platinum (Latin)	200,000^{^}
^{^} Shipments figures based on certification alone.
