= Donato & Estéfano =

Latin pop duo

Donato & Estéfano was a Latin pop duo formed by the collaboration of Donato Poveda of Havana, Cuba, and Fabio Alfonso Salgado ("Estéfano"), a native of Cali, Colombia. Donato y Estefano released three studio albums through 1995–1999 and were nominated twice for Pop Group of the Year at the 8th (1996) and 9th (1997) Lo Nuestro Awards. Their Greatest Hits album was released in 2000.

Estéfano continued with a solo career.

== Translation from old Latin Music.com profile ==
Born in Santiago de Cuba, Donato moved with his family to Havana when he was barely two years old. At eight years of age he already played the guitar and sang, despite the opposition of his father that he did not consider the artistic world as an honest and virile way of life. But Donato stuck to his idea and, thanks to his extraordinary musical gifts, the state guaranteed him admission to the national conservatory. His father, on the contrary, decided to enroll him in a military school to give him more training according to his ideas.

In the military school, Donato formed his own rock and roll band, listening to the music that, through the radio stations in Miami, reached the island. Donato confesses that, at that time, he hated Cuban music. His was rock and roll. But it was not rock and roll that led him to travel the world and allowed him to leave Cuba with the permission of the authorities.

It was precisely the Cuban music, specifically the Nueva Trova Cubana that, in those years, made itself known throughout the world with unusual success. His presence at a popular music festival in Havana had attached him to the movement, allowing him to travel to Spain, Belgium and Mexico as an ambassador of the new Cuban music. Meanwhile he finished his studies and gave the title to his mother.

In 1989 Donato traveled to Venezuela to stay. There he connected with Sony Music and the company signed him as an artist. He later moved to live in Miami where he began to compose for international performers such as Julio Iglesias, José Luis Rodríguez, Chayanne, Willie Chirino and Ana Torroja, among others. One fine day he met another musician recently arrived in Miami (Estéfano) who asked him for some keyboards for one of his compositions, that same day they begin to make music together.

Estéfano was born into a family that loved music, music that he calls consumer music, because it was the music that played on the radio and that his mother sang around the house. Born in Manizales and raised in Cali (Colombia), at the age of four he dreamed that El Niño Dios would give him a guitar, he was already clear that his thing was pop, popular music that invited people to live, dance and have fun. At the age of 12 he was backing vocals on other artists' recordings and at 15 he began composing his own.

At the age of 16, Estéfano went to live in Bogotá. There he begins to sing and compose melodies for publicity, until one day he is commissioned a theme for a soap opera, for which he ends up writing the entire soundtrack. Two years later, he is hired by a record company in Medellín with which he records his first album and tours the country performing at concerts that the public does not quite understand.

The musical culture of the country, in those years, was reduced to folk music and a few names that came from abroad. With that experience, Estéfano was convinced that he had to leave the country if he wanted to succeed in what was irreversibly his vocation and, by choice, his profession.

He went to Miami and went through all the record companies one by one without getting anything concrete. He met Emilio Estefan Jr. and chose some of his songs first for Gloria Estefan's album Mi Tierra, and later for Jon Secada's first album in Spanish. Those two albums each won Grammy Awards in 1993 and 1995, respectively. Later collaborated with a long list of performers such as Julio Iglesias, José Luis Rodríguez, Chayanne, Myriam Hernández, Azucar Moreno, Alejandro Fernández, Mercurio, Shakira and Laura Pausini. This placed their songs at the top of the charts throughout Latin America, Spain and the United States, and consolidated Estéfano's reputation as the most in-demand and prestigious young composer of the decade.

In addition to boosting his musical ambitions, his meeting with Donato also served to open his perception to a series of rhythms and sounds that, although coming from the African continent, evolved in Cuba, giving way to a large part of the Caribbean rhythms as they are today. we perceive them.

== Songs ==
(* Original video)

- Agua de Cascada
- Amar, Sentir
- Amoromanía
- Canciones de Amor
- Cuando Me Acuerdo De Ti
- De La Tierra Al Cielo
- Entre La Línea Del Bien Y La Línea Del Mal
- Estoy Enamorado
- Llegando A Puertas Del Cielo
- Mar Adentro
- Mariachis Y Tequila
- Me Mata La Soledad
- Mi Dios Y Mi Cruz
- Naturaleza
- Quien te quiera como yo
- Sin ti
- Somos Tú y Yo
- Te Estoy Amando
- Vuelve
- Y Bailo
- Ya Te Perdoné
