= Como Te Extraño (album) =

Studio album by Pete Astudillo
- Released: November 21, 1995
- Genre: Latin pop; Tejano cumbia
- Language: Spanish
- Label: EMI Latin
- Producer: A.B. Quintanilla

Pete Astudillo chronology
Como Nadie (1993)	Como Te Extraño (1995)	Si Tu No Estas (1997)

Singles from Como Te Extraño
- 1. "Como Te Extraño" Released: October 1995; 2. "Si No Fui Yo" Released: April 1996

Como Te Extraño (transl. How I Miss You) is the second studio album by American Tejano music singer Pete Astudillo. It was released on November 21, 1995 through EMI Latin. The album was produced by A. B. Quintanilla, who played alongside Astudillo as part of Selena y Los Dinos, a band fronted by Selena. Como Te Extraño was a commercial success peaking at number six on the US Billboard Top Latin Albums chart and number two on the US Billboard Regional Mexican Albums chart. The title track, "Como Te Extraño", was a tribute song for Astudillo's mother and Selena (who was shot and killed eight months prior to the release of the album). The title track peaked atop the US Billboard Regional Mexican Songs chart, while the album's second single "Si No Fui Yo" peaked at number 38 on the US Billboard Hot Latin Songs chart. The album also contains "Contigo Quiero Estar", Selena's 1989 debut single with EMI Latin. Como Te Extraño won the Tejano Music Award for Album of the Year - Orchestra at the 1997 Tejano Music Awards.

== Track listing ==
No.	Title	Writer(s)	Producer(s)	Length
1.	"Como Te Extraño"	A.B. Quintanilla; Joe Ojeda; Pete Astudillo	A.B. Quintanilla	4:40
2.	"Si Me Vas a Dejar"	Astudillo; Quintanilla	Quintanilla	2:56
3.	"Yo Estaré a Tu Lado"	Astudillo; Ricky Vela	Quintanilla	3:24
4.	"Cree en Mi"	Astudillo; Quintanilla	Quintanilla	3:33
5.	"Si No Fui Yo"	Art Hernandez	Quintanilla	3:38
6.	"Contigo Quiero Estar"	Alejandro Montealegre	Quintanilla	3:09
7.	"Amorcito Mio"	Astudillo	Quintanilla	2:45
8.	"Completamente Enamorado"	Eros Ramazzotti · Adelio Cogliati · Piero Cassano	Quintanilla	3:42
9.	"Cayo Una Lagrima"	Quintanilla; Fernanda Torres	Quintanilla	3:08
10.	"Amores Como el Nuestro"	Omar Alfanno	Quintanilla	3:04

== Charts ==
Chart (1996)	Peak position
US Top Latin Albums (Billboard)	6
US Regional Mexican Albums (Billboard)	2

== See also ==
- Selena albums discography
- Latin American music in the United States
