= Key to My Life: The Collection =

Greatest hits album by Boyzone
- Released: 30 January 2006
- Recorded: 1994–1999
- Genre: Pop
- Label: Universal
- Producer: Mike Mangini, Trevor Steel, Carl Sturken, Nigel Wright, Absolute, Jim Steinman, Ian Curnow, Mark Hudson

Boyzone chronology
Ballads - The Love Song Collection (2003)	Key to My Life: The Collection (2006)	Back Again... No Matter What (2008)

Key to My Life: The Collection is the third compilation album released by Irish boyband Boyzone. The album contains material recorded between 1994 and 1999, and was released on 30 January 2006 by Universal.

== Track listing ==
1. "Key to My Life" - 3:44
2. "Will Be Yours" - 3:37
3. "Love Me for a Reason" - 3:38
4. "One Kiss at a Time" - 4:05
5. "This Is Where I Belong" - 5:25
6. "No Matter What" - 4:33
7. "I'm Learning" - 3:41
8. "So Good" - 3:02
9. "Can't Stop Me" - 3:03
10. "Believe in Me" - 3:44
11. "While the World Is Going Crazy" - 5:09
12. "When the Going Gets Tough" - 3:36
13. "When All Is Said & Done" - 3:04
14. "You Needed Me" - 3:30

== Credits ==
- Boyzone – Vocals
- Mike Mangini – Guitar, Producer
- James McNally – Accordion, Whistle
- Ann Morfee – Violin
- Steve Morris – Violin
- Tessa Niles – Background Vocals
- Graeme Perkins – Organizer
- Audrey Riley – Cello
- Trevor Steel – Programming, Producer
- Miriam Stockley – Background Vocals
- Carl Sturken – Arranger, Producer
- Philip Todd – Saxophone
- Peter-John Vettese – Keyboards
- Warren Wiebe – Background Vocals
- Gavyn Wright – String Director
- Nigel Wright – Keyboards, Producer
- Guy Baker – Trumpet
- Clare Finnimore – Viola
- Matt Howe – Mix engineer
- Gillian Kent – Violin
- Michael Hart Thompson – Guitar
- Jeremy Wheatley – Mix engineer
- Andy Caine – Background Vocals
- Clare Thompson – Violin
- Bruce White – Viola
- John Matthews – Background Vocals
- Andy Earl – Photography
- Alex Black – Assistant Engineer
- Tim Willis – Assistant Engineer
- Ben Allen – Guitar
- John R. Angier – Keyboards
- Emma Black – Cello
- Deborah Widdup – Violin
- Nastee – DJ
- Anna Hemery – Violin
- Wayne Hector – Background Vocals, Vocal Arrangement
- Yvonne John Lewis – Background Vocals
- Absolute – Producer, Mix engineer
- Richard George – Violin
- Skoti-Alain Elliot – Bass, Programming, Track Engineer
- Laura Melhuish – Violin
- Orla Quirke – Design, Direction
- Jim Steinman – Producer, Executive Producer
- Paul Martin – Viola
- Tracie Ackerman – Background Vocals
- Tom Lord-Alge – Mix engineer
- Andy Bradfield – Remixing
- Nick Cooper – Cello
- Ian Curnow – Producer
- Danny G. – Keyboards
- Sue Dench – Viola
- Andy Duncan – Drums
- Simon Franglen – Keyboards, Engineer, Programming
- Scott Gordon – Vocal Engineer
- Mark Hudson – Vocal Arrangement, Vocal Producer
- Eric Lijestrand – Digital Editing
- Steve Lipson – Bass, Producer, Programming, Mandolin

== Certifications ==
Region	Certification	Certified units/sales
United Kingdom (BPI)	Silver	60,000^{*}
^{*} Sales figures based on certification alone.
