= List of number-one Billboard Hot Latin Tracks of 1996 =

This is a list containing the Billboard Hot Latin Tracks number-ones of 1996.

Issue date	Song	Artist(s)	Ref.
January 6	"Más Allá"	Gloria Estefan	
January 13	"Si Tú Te Vas"	Enrique Iglesias	
January 20	"Si Tú Te Vas"	Enrique Iglesias	
January 27	"Si Tú Te Vas"	Enrique Iglesias	
February 3	"Amor"	Cristian Castro	
February 10	"Amor"	Cristian Castro	
February 17	"Amor"	Cristian Castro	
February 24	"Amor"	Cristian Castro	
March 2	"Amor"	Cristian Castro	
March 9	"Amor"	Cristian Castro	
March 16	"Amor"	Cristian Castro	
March 23	"Amor"	Cristian Castro	
March 30	"Amor"	Cristian Castro	
April 6	"Amor"	Cristian Castro	
April 13	"Amor"	Cristian Castro	
April 21	"Experiencia Religiosa"	Enrique Iglesias	
April 27	"Experiencia Religiosa"	Enrique Iglesias	
May 4	"Experiencia Religiosa"	Enrique Iglesias	
May 11	"El Circo"	Los Tigres del Norte	
May 18	"¡Basta Ya!"	Olga Tañón	
May 25	"Amarte a Tí"	Cristian Castro	
June 1	"Por Amarte"	Enrique Iglesias	
June 8	"Por Amarte"	Enrique Iglesias	
June 15	"Por Amarte"	Enrique Iglesias	
June 22	"Por Amarte"	Enrique Iglesias	
June 29	"Por Amarte"	Enrique Iglesias	
July 6	"Por Amarte"	Enrique Iglesias	
July 13	"Por Amarte"	Enrique Iglesias	
July 20	"Por Amarte"	Enrique Iglesias	
July 27	"Qué Pena Me Das"	Marco Antonio Solís	
August 3	"Qué Pena Me Das"	Marco Antonio Solís	
August 10	"Qué Pena Me Das"	Marco Antonio Solís	
August 17	"Qué Pena Me Das"	Marco Antonio Solís	
August 24	"Qué Pena Me Das"	Marco Antonio Solís	
August 31	"Qué Pena Me Das"	Marco Antonio Solís	
September 7	"Qué Pena Me Das"	Marco Antonio Solís	
September 14	"Qué Pena Me Das"	Marco Antonio Solís	
September 21	"Qué Pena Me Das"	Marco Antonio Solís	
September 28	"Qué Pena Me Das"	Marco Antonio Solís	
October 5	"No Llores Por Mí"	Enrique Iglesias	
October 12	"Recuerdos, Tristeza y Soledad"	Marco Antonio Solís	
October 19	"Recuerdos, Tristeza y Soledad"	Marco Antonio Solís	
October 26	"Recuerdos, Tristeza y Soledad"	Marco Antonio Solís	
November 2	"Recuerdos, Tristeza y Soledad"	Marco Antonio Solís	
November 9	"Recuerdos, Tristeza y Soledad"	Marco Antonio Solís	
November 16	"Recuerdos, Tristeza y Soledad"	Marco Antonio Solís	
November 23	"Recuerdos, Tristeza y Soledad"	Marco Antonio Solís	
November 30	"Recuerdos, Tristeza y Soledad"	Marco Antonio Solís	
December 7	"Trapecista"	Enrique Iglesias	
December 14	"Trapecista"	Enrique Iglesias	
December 21	"Trapecista"	Enrique Iglesias	
December 28	"Trapecista"	Enrique Iglesias	

== See also ==
- Billboard Hot Latin Tracks
