= Gustavo Orellana =

Ecuadorian architect, teacher and singer (1941–2020)

Gustavo Adolfo Orellana Magallanes
- Born: 1941; Guayaquil, Ecuador
- Died: 2 April 2020; Guayaquil, Ecuador
- Occupation(s): Teacher; Singer; Architect; Diplomat

Gustavo Adolfo Orellana Magallanes (Guayaquil, 1941 – 2 April 2020), was an Ecuadorian teacher and singer, who dedicated almost fifty years of his life to teaching in the National College Vicente Rocafuerte and the last years of his life to music.

== Biography ==
During the government of Jaime Roldós, Orellana was Secretary of Sports and Recreation.

He started doing music in 1996, at age 55; in the same year, he participated in the OTI Festival with the song Canción de amor al viento, which was among the chosen songs.

He dedicated himself to teaching at the Vicente Rocafuerte National College, of which he was a student for almost fifty years; he retired in 2011, at the request of the authorities of the Ministry of Education. After this, he focused entirely on singing. He was also a member of the Vicente Rocafuerte National College Foundation (Conaviro) along with other former students such as Jorge Moreno Guerrero, Gustavo Triviño, Santiago Yépez, Iván Lascano, Enrique Jiménez, Rafael Santelices, Ricardo Vasconcellos, among others, where they held sporting events with students and alumni of all ages. On October 18, 2015, the Conaviro Foundation held a football championship in honor of three teachers, including Orellana, who was the one who began the inauguration of the championship, as the division championship 40–46 years was in his honor. In August 2016, another tournament was held in his honor and that of Enrique Salcedo Arce, on the fields of the Carlos Pérez Perasso Sports City. In 2018, together with Otón Chávez Pazmiño, Aldo Vanoni, Ricardo Vasconcellos and the ideator, José Carbo Robles, coordinated by Iván Lascano, he was part of a commission that founded the Vicentino Sports Hall of Fame, with the idea of perpetuating the footprint of the most outstanding athletes on the team.

He obtained a diploma in Higher Education and worked as a teacher at the Faculty of Architecture at the University of Guayaquil until September 2012.

In March 2013, he participated in the Ascap award, where he met the Mexican group Los Tigres del Norte and Jorge Pinos, who managed Gloria Estefan’s shows.

In 2014, during a show for Mother's Day, he released his second album called Recordando el ayer, volumen 2, including boleros such as Amor mío, Cómo fue, Espérame en el cielo, No sé qué pasa conmigo, Si me comprendieras and Sabor a mí. He recorded his two albums at the record company Ecuasound Productions, owned by his former student Iván Castro, in United States. He also composed the songs Mi gran Guayaquil and Barcelona, el único campeón, dedicated to the football team Barcelona Sporting Club.

== Death ==
Orellana died in his native Guayaquil on 2 April 2020, of COVID-19, during the pandemic in Ecuador.
