= Por Amarte =

Single by Enrique Iglesias

from the album Enrique Iglesias
- Released: 8 January 1996
- Recorded: 1995
- Genre: Latin pop; pop rock
- Length: 4:00
- Label: Fonovisa
- Songwriters: Enrique Iglesias; Roberto Morales
- Producer: Rafael Pérez-Botija

Enrique Iglesias singles chronology
"Experiencia Religiosa" (1995)	"Por Amarte" (1996)	"No Llores Por Mí" (1996)

"Por Amarte" (English: To Love You) is the title of the third single released by Spanish singer-songwriter Enrique Iglesias from his eponymous debut studio album Enrique Iglesias (1995), It was released by Fonovisa on 8 January 1996 (see 1996 in music).

== Song information ==
The track was written by Enrique Iglesias and co-written by Roberto Morales, produced by Rafael Pérez-Botija, and became Iglesias’ third consecutive chart topper in U.S. The song also was featured on the Mexican telenovela Marisol (1996), produced by Juan Osorio, starring Eduardo Santamarina and Erika Buenfil. with a few changes in the lyrics. Instead of Por amarte daría mi vida ("To love you, I’d give my life"), the words were: Por amarte Marisol, moriría ("To love you, Marisol, I’d die"). The singer won an ASCAP award for Por Amarte in 1996 and at the 9th Lo Nuestro Awards received a nomination for "Pop Song of the Year", losing to Iglesias own "Experiencia Religiosa".

== Chart performance ==
The track debuted in the United States Billboard Hot Latin Tracks chart at number 8 on 18 May 1996, and rise to number 1 in only three weeks (the fastest for the singer) and spent eight weeks at pole position. The single spent twelve weeks in the Top Ten and also peaked at number 1 in Mexico for two weeks. Por Amarte peaked at number-one one week after the album Enrique Iglesias climbed to number-one in the Top Latin Albums chart for the first time. According to the newspaper El Siglo de Torreón, the music was well performed in cities of Bolivia.

== Charts ==
=== Weekly charts ===
Chart (1996)	Peak position
US Hot Latin Songs (Billboard)	1
US Latin Pop Airplay (Billboard)	1
US Regional Mexican Airplay (Billboard)	2
US Tropical Airplay (Billboard)	13

=== Year-end charts ===
Chart (1996)	Position
US Hot Latin Songs (Billboard)	3
US Latin Pop Airplay (Billboard)	1

== See also ==
- Billboard Hot Latin Songs Year-End Chart
- List of number-one Billboard Hot Latin Tracks of 1996
- List of Billboard Latin Pop Airplay number ones of 1996
