= Every Day I Love You =

1999 single by Boyzone

Single by Boyzone

from the album By Request (Asian special edition bonus tracks)
- B-side: "No Matter"; "Will I Ever See You"
- Released: 22 November 1999
- Length: 3:42
- Label: Polydor
- Songwriters: Gary Baker; Frank Joseph Myers; Jerry Allan Williams
- Producer: Stephen Lipson

Boyzone singles chronology
"You Needed Me" (1999)	"Every Day I Love You" (1999)	"Love You Anyway" (2008)

Music video
- "Every Day I Love You" on YouTube

"Every Day I Love You" is the final single from Irish boy band Boyzone before their initial split in 2000. The song peaked at No. 3 on the UK Singles Chart and became their eighth No. 1 single in Ireland. The song has received a silver certification in the United Kingdom for shipping 200,000 copies.

== Music video ==
The video shows the band travelling in a car, riding through Prague. A woman is shown staring at them along the way until they reach a café where they stop, and the woman places her suitcase on their car and vanishes. As the song progresses, the band sees other people vanish into thin air as well, but they eventually reappear as the song ends. The woman who places her suitcase on their car appears again and takes her suitcase back, and the band eventually exit from the café in their car.

== Track listings ==
UK CD1

1. "Every Day I Love You"
2. "No Matter"
3. "Will I Ever See You"

UK CD2 (in limited-edition digipak)

1. "Every Day I Love You"
2. "A Different Beat" (live from Sheffield Arena 15 May 1999)
3. "Boyzone Christmas Message" (live from the video shoot for "Every Day I Love You" in Prague on 16 October 1999)

UK cassette single

1. "Every Day I Love You"
2. "No Matter"

== Charts ==
=== Weekly charts ===
Chart (1999–2000)	Peak position
Belgium (Ultratop 50 Flanders)	17
Belgium (Ultratip Bubbling Under Wallonia)	7
Europe (Eurochart Hot 100)	15
Europe (European Hit Radio)	42
Finland (Suomen virallinen lista)	20
Germany (GfK)	41
Ireland (IRMA)	1
Netherlands (Dutch Top 40)	35
Netherlands (Single Top 100)	34
Netherlands Airplay (Music & Media)	21
New Zealand (Recorded Music NZ)	24
Norway (VG-lista)	10
Scotland Singles (OCC)	4
Sweden (Sverigetopplistan)	13
Switzerland (Schweizer Hitparade)	56
UK Singles (OCC)	3
UK Airplay (Music Week)	12

=== Year-end charts ===
Chart (1999)	Position
UK Singles (OCC)	66

== Certifications ==
Region	Certification	Certified units/sales
United Kingdom (BPI)	Silver	200,000^{^}
^{^} Shipments figures based on certification alone.

== Release history ==
Region	Date	Format(s)	Label(s)	Ref.
United Kingdom	22 November 1999	CD; cassette	Polydor	
New Zealand	13 December 1999	CD; cassette	Polydor	
