= No Llores Por Mí =

Single by Enrique Iglesias

from the album Enrique Iglesias
- Released: 6 May 1996
- Recorded: 1995
- Genre: Latin pop; pop rock
- Length: 4:11
- Label: Fonovisa
- Songwriters: Enrique Iglesias; Roberto Morales
- Producer: Rafael Pérez-Botija

Enrique Iglesias singles chronology
"Por Amarte" (1996)	"No Llores Por Mí" (1996)	"Trapecista" (1996)

"No Llores Por Mí" (English: Don't Cry for Me) is the fourth single released by Spanish singer-songwriter Enrique Iglesias from his eponymous debut studio album Enrique Iglesias (1995), It was released by Fonovisa on 6 May 1996 (see 1996 in music).

== Song information ==
The track was written by Enrique Iglesias and co-written by Roberto Morales, produced by Rafael Pérez-Botija, and became Iglesias fourth consecutive chart topper in the U.S. In 1996, "No Llores Por Mí" was performed as a duet with Mexican singer Ana Bárbara for a televised music special aired in Mexico and the United States.

Only two albums achieved four number-one singles in the Billboard Hot Latin Tracks before: Amor Prohibido by Selena and Otro Día Más Sin Verte by Jon Secada. This record was broken by Iglesias with his following single "Trapecista". The singer won an ASCAP award for "No Llores Por Mí" in 1996.

== Chart performance ==
The track debuted in the United States Billboard Hot Latin Tracks chart at number 28 on 3 August 1996, and rose to number 1 eight weeks later. The single spent twelve weeks in the top ten.

Chart (1996)	Peak position
U.S. Billboard Hot Latin Tracks	1
U.S. Billboard Latin Pop Airplay	2
U.S. Billboard Latin Regional Mexican Airplay	5
U.S. Billboard Latin Tropical/Salsa Airplay	18

== See also ==
- List of number-one Billboard Hot Latin Tracks of 1996
