= Enrique Iglesias (album) =

1995 debut studio album by Enrique Iglesias

Studio album by Enrique Iglesias
- Released: November 21, 1995
- Recorded: 1995
- Studios: Phase One Studios (Toronto, Ontario, Canada); Fantasy Studios (San Francisco, California, U.S.); Ocean Way Recording Studios; Westlake Studio (Hollywood, California, U.S.)
- Genres: Latin pop; pop rock; soft rock; latin ballad
- Length: 42:00
- Language: Spanish · Portuguese · Italian
- Label: Fonovisa
- Producer: Rafael Pérez Botija

Enrique Iglesias chronology
| Enrique Iglesias (1995) | Vivir (1997) |

Singles from Enrique Iglesias
- 1. "Si Tú Te Vas" Released: September 25, 1995; 2. "Experiencia Religiosa" Released: January 15, 1996; 3. "Por Amarte" Released: April 8, 1996; 4. "No Llores Por Mí" Released: June 3, 1996; 5. "Trapecista" Released: October 7, 1996

Professional ratings
Review scores
| Source | Rating |
|---|---|
| Allmusic | 4/5 stars |
| Los Angeles Times | 2/4 stars |

Enrique Iglesias is the debut studio album recorded by the Spanish singer-songwriter Enrique Iglesias, The album witch released by Fonovisa Records on November 21, 1995 (see 1995 in music). The album was a success and topped the Latin charts. It also won the Grammy Award for Best Latin Pop Album at the 39th Annual Grammy Awards, held on Wednesday February 26, 1997. The album received a Gold certification in Portugal after a weeks of sales, and has sold more than 4 million copies worldwide. In the United States it was certified Platinum on November 18, 1996, becoming one of the best selling Latin albums of all times in that country. All singles of the album hit the number-one spot in the Billboard Hot Latin Tracks chart: "Si Tú Te Vas", "Experiencia Religiosa", "Por Amarte", "No Llores Por Mí" and "Trapecista", the most for any Latin album, beating Selena and Jon Secada with four chart-toppers, each.

== Commercial performance ==
The album debuted in the Billboard Top Latin Albums chart at number 38 in the week of 23 December 1995, climbing to the Top Ten five weeks later. The album dethroned Selena's Dreaming of You in the week of 25 May 1996 (after being in the chart for 28 weeks), spending ten consecutive weeks at pole position and an extra week after being kept off from the top spot by the compilation album Macarena Mix. The album spent 73 weeks inside the Top Ten (with at least two weeks in every position) and 100 weeks in the chart.

== Track listing ==
Standard edition
| No. | Title | Writer(s) | Translation | Length |
|---|---|---|---|---|
| 1. | "No Llores Por Mí" | Enrique Iglesias; Roberto Morales | Do Not Cry for Me | 4:11 |
| 2. | "Trapecista" | Rafael Pérez-Botija | Trapeze Artist | 4:27 |
| 3. | "Por Amarte" | Enrique Iglesias; Roberto Morales | To Love You | 4:00 |
| 4. | "Si Tú Te Vas" | Enrique Iglesias; Roberto Morales | If You Go | 4:00 |
| 5. | "Si Juras Regresar" | Rafael Pérez-Botija | If You Swear to Return | 4:24 |
| 6. | "Experiencia Religiosa" | Chein García-Alonso | Religious Experience | 5:32 |
| 7. | "Falta Tanto Amor" | Enrique Iglesias; Roberto Morales | Lacking Too Much Love | 3:55 |
| 8. | "Inalcanzable" | Enrique Iglesias; Roberto Morales | Unattainable | 3:35 |
| 9. | "Muñeca Cruel" | Rafael Pérez-Botija | Cruel Girl (literally 'Doll') | 4:18 |
| 10. | "Invéntame" | Marco Antonio Solís | Lie to Me | 3:49 |

Italian-language version
| No. | Title | Writer(s) | Translation | Length |
|---|---|---|---|---|
| 1. | "Piangerai Per Me" | Iglesias; Morales | Do Not Cry for Me | 4:11 |
| 2. | "Per Amarti" | Iglesias; Morales | By Love | 4:00 |
| 3. | "Se Te Ne Vai" | Iglesias; Morales | If You Are Going | 4:00 |
| 4. | "Esperienza Religiosa" | García-Alonso | Mystical Experience | 5:32 |
| 5. | "Corri Vai da Lui" | Iglesias; Morales | Lack Much Love | 3:54 |
| 6. | "Bambola Crudele" | Pérez-Botija | Cruel Twist | 4:19 |
| 7. | "Esperienza Religiosa" (Remix) | García-Alonso | Mystical Experience | 4:58 |
| 8. | "Se Te Ne Vai" (Remix) | Iglesias; Morales | If You Are Going | 4:28 |

Portuguese-language version
| No. | Title | Writer(s) | Translation | Length |
|---|---|---|---|---|
| 1. | "Se Você Se Vai" | Iglesias; Morales | If You Are Going | 4:01 |
| 2. | "Experiência Religiosa" | García-Alonso | Mystical Experience | 4:58 |
| 3. | "Por Amar-Te" | Iglesias; Morales | By Love | 4:00 |
| 4. | "Não Vai Chorar Por mim" | Iglesias; Morales | Do Not Cry for Me | 4:11 |
| 5. | "Falta Aquele Amor" | Iglesias; Morales | Lack Much Love | 3:54 |
| 6. | "No Llores Por Mí" | Iglesias; Morales | Do Not Cry for Me | 4:11 |
| 7. | "Trapecista" | Pérez-Botija | Aerialist | 4:27 |
| 8. | "Por Amarte" | Iglesias; Morales | By Love | 4:00 |
| 9. | "Si Tú Te Vas" | Iglesias; Morales | If You Are Going | 4:00 |
| 10. | "Si Juras Regresar" | Pérez-Botija | If You Swear Back | 4:24 |
| 11. | "Experiencia Religiosa" | García-Alonso | Mystical Experience | 5:32 |
| 12. | "Falta Tanto Amor" | Iglesias; Morales | Lack Much Love | 3:56 |
| 13. | "Inalcanzable" | Iglesias; Morales | Unattainable | 3:35 |
| 14. | "Muñeca Cruel" | Pérez-Botija | Cruel Twist | 4:18 |
| 15. | "Invéntame" | Solís | Make Believe | 3:49 |

== Credits and personnel ==
- Gordon Lyon: Engineer and mixer
- Victor McCoy: Assistant engineer
- Paul McKenna: Engineer
- Frank Rinella: Assistant engineer
- Eric Ratz: Engineer
- Barry Rudolph: Engineer
- Miguel De La Vega: Engineer
- Brad Haehnel: Assistant engineer
- Tony Franco: Coordinator
- Christina Abaroa: Coordinator
- Stephan Ach: Photography
- Alan Silfen: Photography
- Fernando Martinez: Photography
- Rafael Pérez Botija: Producer, arranger, keyboards, Hammond organ
- Enrique Iglesias: vocals
- Scott Alexander: Bass
- Gregg Bissonette: drums
- Robbie Buchanan: Hammond organ
- Luis Conte: percussion
- George Doering: Guitar
- Christian Kolm: Guitar
- Michael Landau: Guitar
- Roberto Morales: Guitar, Advisor
- Manuel Santisteban: Arranger, Keyboards
- Randy Waldman: Piano
- Francis Benítez: vocals, choir
- Leyla Hoyle: Vocals, choir
- Carlos Murguía: Vocals, choir
- Kenny O'Brian: Arranger, Vocals
- Stephanie Spruill: Vocals

== Charts ==
| Chart (1996) | Peak position |
|---|---|
| Argentine Albums (CAPIF) | 2 |
| Australian Albums (ARIA) | 188 |
| Belgian Albums Chart (Flanders) | 21 |
| Dutch Albums Chart | 67 |
| European Top 100 Albums (Music & Media) | 57 |
| Mexican Top 100 Albums Chart | 1 |
| Netherlands Album chart | 67 |
| Portugal Album chart | 2 |
| Spanish Album chart | 5 |
| U.S. Billboard 200 | 148 |
| US Billboard Top Latin Albums | 1 |
| US Billboard Latin Pop Albums | 1 |
| US Billboard Heatseekers Albums | 5 |

== Certifications and sales ==
| Region | Certification | Certified units/sales |
|---|---|---|
| Brazil (Pro-Música Brasil) | Gold | 200,000 |
| Central America (CFC) | Diamond | 100,000 |
| Colombia | Platinum | 77,129 |
| Mexico (AMPROFON) | Diamond | 1,000,000^{^} |
| Portugal (AFP) | Gold | |
| Spain (Promusicae) | 4× Platinum | 400,000^{^} |
| United States (RIAA) | Platinum | 1,000,000^{^} |
Summaries
| Latin America | — | 1,500,000 |
| Worldwide | — | 4,000,000 |
^{^} Shipments figures based on certification alone.

== See also ==
- 1995 in Latin music
- List of best-selling Latin albums
- List of number-one Billboard Top Latin Albums from the 1990s
- List of number-one Billboard Latin Pop Albums from the 1990s
