= You Needed Me =

1978 single by Anne Murray

Single by Anne Murray

from the album Let's Keep It That Way
- B-side: "I Still Wish the Very Best for You"
- Released: May 1978
- Recorded: January 1978
- Genre: Soft rock
- Length: 3:41
- Label: Capitol
- Songwriter: Randy Goodrum
- Producer: Jim Ed Norman

Anne Murray singles chronology
"Walk Right Back" (1978)	"You Needed Me" (1978)	"Hey, Daddy" (1978)

Audio
- "You Needed Me" on YouTube

"You Needed Me" is a song written by Randy Goodrum, who describes it as being about "unconditional undeserved love". It was a number-one single in the United States in 1978 for Canadian singer Anne Murray, for which she won a Grammy Award. In 1999, Irish pop band Boyzone recorded a hit cover of the song that reached number one on the UK Singles Chart.

== Original Anne Murray version ==
"You Needed Me" was first recorded by singer Anne Murray in 1978. The song peaked at number one on the Billboard Hot 100 chart and revitalized her career after several years of declining popularity as it became her first Top 40 US single since her 1974 remake of The Beatles' "You Won't See Me". The song, included on her 1978 album Let's Keep It That Way, was also a top-five country single and won Song of the Year at the Academy of Country Music awards, and is her most successful single in the United Kingdom, where it made the top 30. Murray is quoted in The Billboard Book of Number One Hits by Fred Bronson as saying she was not surprised by the song's success, as she knew from the start the song would be a hit because she broke down in tears the first time she tried to sing it.

Although the song reached number one on the Billboard Hot 100 chart (and is her only song to top that chart), it never topped the two Billboard charts where Murray has had the most success—Country and Adult Contemporary. However, it spent a then-record 36 weeks on the Adult Contemporary chart, a record for chart longevity that stood until 1990. The song spent 10 weeks at number one in Malaysia.

The song earned Murray the Grammy Award for Best Female Pop Vocal Performance at the 21st Grammy Awards, the first to be awarded to a Canadian artist. The single was certified Platinum in Canada and Gold in the US.

Anne Murray re-recorded the song with Shania Twain for Murray's 2007 album Duets: Friends & Legends.

The song was featured in an ongoing storyline on the CBS soap Guiding Light in 1980–81, as a theme song for the characters Kelly Nelson and Morgan Richards.

In 2013, the song was performed by Seth MacFarlane in character as Stewie Griffin on the Family Guy episode "Chris Cross", in which Anne Murray herself guest-starred.

=== Charts ===
==== Weekly charts ====
Chart (1978)	Peak position
Australia (Kent Music Report)	2
Canada Top Singles (RPM)	1
Canada Adult Contemporary Tracks (RPM)	1
Canada Country Tracks (RPM)	1
Ireland (IRMA)	7
Netherlands (Single Top 100)	22
New Zealand (Recorded Music NZ)	6
South Africa (Springbok)	5
UK Singles (Official Charts)	22
US Billboard Hot 100	1
US Adult Contemporary (Billboard)	3
US Hot Country Songs (Billboard)	4

==== Year-end charts ====
Chart (1978)	Rank
Australia (Kent Music Report)	40
Canada Top Singles (RPM')	3
New Zealand (RIANZ)	34
US Billboard Hot 100	63

Chart (1979)	Rank
Australia (Kent Music Report)	87

=== Certifications ===
Region	Certification	Certified units/sales
Canada (Music Canada)	Platinum	100,000^{^}
United States (RIAA)	Gold	1,000,000^{^}
^{*} Sales figures based on certification alone.^{^} Shipments figures based on certification alone.

== Boyzone version ==
"You Needed Me"

Single by Boyzone

from the album By Request
- B-side: "Words Can't Describe"; "Megamix (Love to Infinity)"; "Too Late Tonight"
- Released: May 10, 1999
- Studio: London, England
- Length: 3:27
- Label: Polydor
- Songwriter: Randy Goodrum
- Producer: Steve Mac

Boyzone singles chronology
"When the Going Gets Tough" (1999)	"You Needed Me" (1999)	"Every Day I Love You" (1999)

Music video
- "You Needed Me" on YouTube

"You Needed Me" was covered by Irish boy band Boyzone in 1999. It was released as the second single from their album By Request. It became their sixth and final single to reach number one on the UK Singles Chart, outselling Spice Girl Geri Halliwell's debut single, "Look at Me", by 748 copies. The song received a gold disc for sales of 400,000 copies in the UK.

=== Track listings ===
Irish maxi-CD single

1. "You Needed Me"
2. "When the Going Gets Tough"
3. "You Needed Me" (Jewels & Stone Remix)
4. "Megamix (Love to Infinity)"

UK CD1

1. "You Needed Me"
2. "Words Can't Describe"
3. "Megamix (Love to Infinity)"

UK CD2

1. "You Needed Me"
2. "You Needed Me" (Jewels & Stone Remix)
3. "Too Late Tonight"
4. "You Needed Me" (video)

UK cassette single

1. "You Needed Me"
2. "Words Can't Describe"

=== Credits and personnel ===
Credits are lifted from the By Request album booklet.

Studio

- Engineered and programmed at Rokstone Studios (London, England)

Personnel

- Randy Goodrum – writing
- Wayne Hector – additional backing vocals, backing vocal arrangement
- Ali Tennant – additional backing vocals
- Yvonne John Lewis – additional backing vocals
- John Matthews – additional backing vocals
- Paul Gendler – guitars
- Steve Mac – production, backing vocal arrangement
- Chris Laws – engineering, programming
- Matt Howe – mix engineering
- Richard Niles – string arrangement

=== Charts ===
==== Weekly charts ====
Chart (1999)	Peak position
Austria (Ö3 Austria Top 40)	38
Belgium (Ultratop 50 Flanders)	22
Czech Republic (IFPI)	36
Europe (Eurochart Hot 100)	6
Europe (European Hit Radio)	17
Germany (GfK)	36
Iceland (Íslenski Listinn Topp 40)	20
Ireland (IRMA)	2
Netherlands (Dutch Top 40)	13
Netherlands (Single Top 100)	16
New Zealand (Recorded Music NZ)	1
Norway (VG-lista)	15
Scottish Singles Sales (Official Charts)	1
Sweden (Sverigetopplistan)	21
Switzerland (Schweizer Hitparade)	29
Taiwan (IFPI Taiwan)	1
UK Singles (Official Charts)	1
UK Airplay (Music Week)	11

==== Year-end charts ====
Chart (1999)	Position
Netherlands (Dutch Top 40)	123
New Zealand (RIANZ)	27
UK Singles (OCC)	49

=== Certifications ===
Region	Certification	Certified units/sales
New Zealand (RMNZ)	Gold	5,000^{*}
United Kingdom (BPI)	Gold	400,000^{‡}
^{*} Sales figures based on certification alone.^{‡} Sales+streaming figures based on certification alone.

=== Release history ===
Region	Date	Format(s)	Label(s)	Ref.
United Kingdom	May 10, 1999	CD; cassette	Polydor	
Japan	May 19, 1999	CD	Polydor	

== Other versions ==
- The New Seekers, a late 1978 single.
- Burl Ives – included in the album The Magic Balladeer (1993).
- Daniel O'Donnell – in his album Songs of Inspiration (1996).
- Howard Keel – for his 1985 album Reminiscing – The Howard Keel Collection. This peaked at #20 in the UK album chart during a 12-week stay.
- Lynn Anderson recorded her version of "You Needed Me" for the 1983 album Up Close. The song was subsequently included in various country and love song compilation albums that include her.
- Patti Page – for her album Best Country Songs (2008).
- Perry Como – Perry Como Live on Tour (1981)
- Val Doonican – in the album It's Good to See You (1988).
- Vic Damone – included in his album Now (1981).
- Cilla Black – included on her Especially for You album (1980)
- Kenny Rogers, Dottie West – included in the album Classics (1978)
- Dana Winner - Unforgettable Album (2001)
