= A Different Beat (song) =

1996 single by Boyzone

Single by Boyzone

from the album A Different Beat
- B-side: "Angel"
- Released: 2 December 1996
- Studio: The Mothership (UK)
- Length: 4:10 (album version); 3:34 (radio edit)
- Label: Polydor
- Songwriters: Ronan Keating; Stephen Gately; Shane Lynch; Keith Duffy; Martin Brannigan; Ray Hedges
- Producers: Ray "Madman" Hedges; Trevor Horn (radio edit)

Boyzone singles chronology
"Words" (1996)	"A Different Beat" (1996)	"Isn't It a Wonder" (1997)

Music video
- "A Different Beat" on YouTube

"A Different Beat" is a song by Irish boy band Boyzone from their second studio album, A Different Beat (1996). The song was written by Ronan Keating, Stephen Gately, Shane Lynch, Keith Duffy, Martin Brannigan, and Ray Hedges, and it was produced by Hedges with additional production by Trevor Horn on the radio edit. It was released as the album's second single on 2 December 1996 by Polydor Records, becoming their only UK number-one hit to be co-written by members of the group.

In a 2025 interview band member Keith Duffy explained how the song was inspired and written to emulate Take That's 1995 hit "Never Forget" as an anthemic sounding closing song for the group's own concert finales.

== Critical reception ==
A reviewer from Music Week rated the song four out of five, describing it as a "dramatic epic, enriched by African chants". Gerald Martinez from New Sunday Times viewed it as "anthemic".

== Track listings ==
- UK CD1 and Australian CD single
1. "A Different Beat" (radio edit) – 3:34
2. "Angel" – 3:45
3. "A Different Beat" (remix) – 6:10
- UK CD2
1. "A Different Beat" (radio edit) – 3:34
2. "Angel" – 3:45
3. "Key to My Life" (live at Wembley) – 4:12
4. "A Different Beat" (remix) – 6:10
- UK cassette and European CD single
1. "A Different Beat" (radio edit) – 3:52 (3:24 on European CD)
2. "Angel" – 3:45

== Credits and personnel ==
Credits are lifted from the A Different Beat album booklet and the UK CD1 liner notes.

Studios

- Recorded and produced at The Mothership Studios (UK)
- Additional production and remixing at Horn Productions (radio edit)

Personnel

- Ronan Keating – writing
- Stephen Gately – writing
- Shane Lynch – writing
- Keith Duffy – writing
- Martin Brannigan – writing, arrangement
- Ray Hedges – writing, production (as Ray "Madman" Hedges), arrangement
- Tracy Ackerman – additional backing vocals
- Andy Caine – additional backing vocals
- Anne Dudley – string arrangement
- Trevor Horn – additional production and remixing (radio edit)

== Charts ==
=== Weekly charts ===
Chart (1996–1997)	Peak position
Australia (ARIA)	42
Austria (Ö3 Austria Top 40)	37
Belgium (Ultratip Bubbling Under Flanders)	7
Europe (Eurochart Hot 100)	18
Europe (European Hit Radio)	28
France Airplay (SNEP)	85
Germany (GfK)	31
Greece (IFPI Greece)	4
Iceland (Íslenski Listinn Topp 40)	36
Ireland (IRMA)	2
Israel (Israeli Singles Chart)	6
Netherlands (Dutch Top 40 Tipparade)	8
Netherlands (Single Top 100)	78
Scottish Singles Sales (Official Charts)	1
Spain Airplay (Top 40 Radio)	24
UK Singles (Official Charts)	1
UK Airplay (Music Week)	7

=== Year-end charts ===
Chart (1996)	Position
UK Singles (OCC)	53

== Certifications ==
Region	Certification	Certified units/sales
United Kingdom (BPI)	Silver	200,000^{^}
^{^} Shipments figures based on certification alone.
