= El Deseo de Oír Tu Voz =

Studio album by Cristian
- Released: 23 January 1996
- Recorded: 1995
- Studio: Old House Studio (New York City)
- Genre: Latin pop; pop rock; latin rock; bolero; latin ballad
- Length: 43:49
- Label: Fonovisa
- Producer: Daniel Freiberg

Cristian chronology
El Camino del Alma (1994)	El Deseo de Oír Tu Voz (1996)	Lo Mejor de Mí (1997)

Singles from El Deseo de Oír Tu Voz
- 1. "Morelia" Released: 10 July 1995; 2. "Amor" Released: 27 November 1995; 3. "Amarte a Tí" Released: 8 April 1996; 4. "Cómo Nube En El Viento" Released: 6 May 1996; 5. "Esperándote" Released: 20 May 1996; 6. "El Deseo de Oír Tu Voz" Released: 8 July 1996; 7. "No Puedo Arrancarte de Mí" Released: 5 August 1996; 8. "Sólo Tú" Released: 7 October 1996; 9. "Una y Mil Veces" Released: 18 November 1996

Professional ratings
Review scores
Source	Rating
AllMusic	3/5 stars

El Deseo de Oír Tu Voz (English: The Wish of Hear Your Voice) is the fourth studio album recorded by Mexican singer-songwriter Cristian Castro. It was released by Fonovisa Records on 23 January 1996 (see 1996 in music). It was the last album to be released under label. The album was produced by Daniel Freiberg. The song "Morelia", was previously used as the main theme for the telenovela of the same name and was also previously released on Castro's 1994 album El Camino del Alma. The singles "Amor" and "Amarte a Ti" both reached number one Billboard Hot Latin Tracks and Billboard Latin Pop Airplay in 1996.

== Track listing ==
No.	Title	Writer(s)	Length
1.	"Amarte a Ti"	Daniel Freiberg; Walter Arenzon	3:26
2.	"Esperándote"	A.B. Quintanilla III; Ricky Vela	4:10
3.	"Amor"	Cristian Castro	4:59
4.	"Una y Mil Veces"	Donato Póveda	5:24
5.	"Sólo Tú"	Donato Póveda	4:25
6.	"Cómo Nube en el Viento"	Donato Póveda	3:20
7.	"El Deseo de Oír Tu Voz"	Allan Rich; Jud Friedman; Adpt: Spanish: Mari Luret	3:30
8.	"Dáme Un Beso"	Walter Arenzon	4:40
9.	"No Puedo Arrancarte de Mí"	Marco Antonio Jimenez Contreras	4:01
10.	"Así es el Calor"	Andrés Calamaro; G. Herrera	3:25
11.	"Ódiame"	Rafael Otero	2:45
12.	"Morelia"	Jorge Avendaño Lührs	4:33
Total length:			43:49

=== Columbia Edition ===
No.	Title	Writer(s)	Length
12.	"Vuélveme a Querer"	Jorge Avendaño Lührs	4:11
Total length:			43:23

== Chart performance ==
Year	Chart	Peak
1996	Heatseekers	21
1996	Latin Pop	3
1996	Top Latin Albums	4
1996	Chile	8

== Sales ==
Region	Certification	Certified units/sales
Argentina	—	110,000
