= A Different Beat (Boyzone album) =

Studio album by Boyzone
- Released: 28 October 1996
- Recorded: 1995–96
- Genre: Pop
- Length: 51:03
- Label: Polydor
- Producers: Phil Coulter, Ian Curnow, Phil Harding, Ray Hedges, Ric Wake

Boyzone chronology
Said and Done (1995)	A Different Beat (1996)	Where We Belong (1998)

Singles from A Different Beat
- 1. "Words" Released: 7 October 1996; 2. "A Different Beat" Released: 2 December 1996; 3. "Isn't It a Wonder" Released: 10 March 1997; 4. "Mystical Experience" Released: 4 November 1997 (US)

Professional ratings
Review scores
Source	Rating
AllMusic	3/5 stars
The Guardian	3/5 stars
Music Week	4/5 stars

A Different Beat is the second studio album released by Irish boy band Boyzone on 28 October 1996 by Polydor Records. This was Boyzone’s first album to be released in the United States on September 23, 1997. “Mystical Experience”, recorded specifically for the U.S. market, was released as the lead single.

== Background ==
Like their debut album Said and Done, much of the original material on the album was co-written by members of the group. After the success of their debut, the release of A Different Beat occurred on a much bigger scale. As Said and Done was never released in France, when "Love Me for a Reason" was released as the group's debut single there, it ended up being included on A Different Beat, exclusively in the region. The first international single, "Words", was released pretty much worldwide, as were the two follow-up singles, "A Different Beat" and "Isn't It a Wonder". By this time, the album had been released in the UK and France, complete with each region's respective singles. However, the album had not yet been issued in Australia. Thus, by the time the release of A Different Beat arrived in the country, "Picture of You" had already been released as the lead single from Where We Belong in the UK, so the Australian market decided to include "Picture of You" on A Different Beat instead, releasing it as the fourth single from the album. "Picture of You" was also included on the Tour Souvenir Edition of the album, and the New Edition, which was marketed in certain areas of Europe. The limited-edition version of the album released in the UK came encased in a slipcase, with five limited edition postcards, each containing one member of the band.

The United States became the last country to receive a release, as the band were asked by their US management to tweak the album for the US market. As such, "Picture of You" also became included on the US track listing, as well as a Spanglish version of "Words", and an all-new track, "Mystical Experience", which was released in the US as the first single from the album. The album, however, was noted for including a cover of the Don Black and Walter Scharf song "Ben", performed previously by Michael Jackson. A Different Beat was certified three times platinum in the UK and sold 2 million copies worldwide.

== Track listing ==
No.	Title	Writer(s)	Producer(s)	Length
1.	"Paradise" (lead vocals: Keating)	Ronan Keating, Ray Hedges, Martin Brannigan	Hedges	3:30
2.	"A Different Beat" (lead vocals: Gately, Keating)	Keating, Stephen Gately, Shane Lynch, Keith Duffy, Brannigan, Hedges	Hedges	4:10
3.	"Melting Pot" (lead vocals: Keating featuring Madeline Bell)	Roger Cook, Roger Greenway	Hedges, Phil Harding, Ian Curnow	3:33
4.	"Ben" (lead vocals: Gately)	Don Black, Walter Scharf	Ric Wake	2:44
5.	"Don't Stop Looking for Love" (lead vocals: Gately)	Billy Mann, Brett Laurence	Wake	4:12
6.	"Isn't It a Wonder" (lead vocals: Keating)	Keating, Hedges, Brannigan	Hedges	3:30
7.	"Words" (lead vocals: Keating)	Barry Gibb, Robin Gibb, Maurice Gibb	Harding, Curnow	3:55
8.	"It's Time" (lead vocals: Keating, Gately)	Keating, Gately, Lynch, Duffy, Hedges, Brannigan	Hedges	3:32
9.	"Games of Love" (lead vocals: Gately)	Gately, Hedges, Brannigan	Hedges	3:35
10.	"Strong Enough" (lead vocals: Keating, Lynch (rap))	Keating, Curnow, Julian Gallagher, Harding	Harding, Curnow	3:37
11.	"Heaven Knows" (lead vocals: Keating)	Keating, Hedges, Brannigan	Hedges	4:02
12.	"Crying in the Night" (lead vocals: Keating)	Keating, Gately, Lynch, Hedges, Brannigan	Hedges	3:03
13.	"Give a Little" (lead vocals: Gately, Keating)	Gately, Hedges, Brannigan	Hedges	3:20
14.	"She Moved Through the Fair" (lead vocals: Keating)	Traditional	Phil Coulter	4:20

Japanese bonus tracks
No.	Title	Writer(s)	Producer(s)	Length
15.	"Angel" (lead vocals: Gately)	Gately, Brannigan, Hedges	Hedges	3:43
16.	"What Can You Do for Me?" (lead vocals: Keating)	Keating, Hedges, Brannigan, Mikey Graham	Hedges	3:03

Australian limited edition bonus disc
No.	Title	Writer(s)	Producer(s)	Length
15.	"Picture of You" (lead vocals: Keating)	Paul Watkins, Paul Wilson, Nigel Kennedy, Ronan Keating	Absolute	3:28
16.	"Words" (lead vocals: Keating)	Barry Gibb, Robin Gibb, Maurice Gibb	Ray Hedges, Rafael Pérez-Botija	3:55
17.	"Let the Message Run Free"	Ronan Keating, Hedges, Martin Brannigan	Hedges	5:03

Tour Souvenir Edition bonus tracks
No.	Title	Writer(s)	Producer(s)	Length
15.	"Picture of You" (lead vocals: Keating)	Paul Watkins, Paul Wilson, Nigel Kennedy, Ronan Keating	Absolute	3:28
16.	"Angel" (lead vocals: Keating)	Stephen Gately, Ray Hedges, Martin Brannigan	Hedges	3:43
17.	"What Can You Do for Me?" (lead vocals: Keating)	Ronan Keating, Hedges, Brannigan, Mikey Graham	Hedges	3:03
18.	"Get Up and Get Over" (lead vocals: Keating)	Keating, Gately, Brannigan, Hedges	Hedges	3:14
19.	"A Different Beat" (remix)	Keating, Hedges, Brannigan, Keith Duffy, Shane Lynch, Gately	Hedges	6:45

Disc 2: UK limited edition interview disc
No.	Title	Length
1.	"Interview" (Boyzone interviewed by Pete Lorraine, editor of Top of the Pops magazine)	4:48

French edition
No.	Title	Writer(s)	Producer(s)	Length
1.	"Paradise"	Ronan Keating, Ray Hedges, Martin Brannigan	Hedges	3:30
2.	"A Different Beat"	Keating, Stephen Gately, Shane Lynch, Keith Duffy, Brannigan, Hedges	Hedges	4:10
3.	"Melting Pot"	Roger Cook, Roger Greenway	Hedges, Phil Harding, Ian Curnow	3:33
4.	"Ben"	Don Black, Walter Scharf	Ric Wake	2:44
5.	"Don't Stop Looking for Love"	Billy Mann, Brett Laurence	Wake	4:12
6.	"Isn't It a Wonder"	Keating, Hedges, Brannigan	Hedges	3:30
7.	"Words"	Barry Gibb, Robin Gibb, Maurice Gibb	Harding, Curnow	3:55
8.	"It's Time"	Keating, Gately, Lynch, Duffy, Hedges, Brannigan	Hedges	3:32
9.	"Games of Love"	Gately, Hedges, Brannigan	Hedges	3:35
10.	"Strong Enough"	Keating, Curnow, Julian Gallagher, Harding	Harding, Curnow	3:37
11.	"Heaven Knows"	Keating, Hedges, Brannigan	Hedges	4:02
12.	"Crying in the Night"	Keating, Gately, Lynch, Hedges, Brannigan	Hedges	3:03
13.	"Give a Little"	Gately, Hedges, Brannigan	Hedges	3:20
14.	"Love Me for a Reason"	Johnny Bristol, Wade Brown, David Jones Jr.	Ray Hedges	3:39
15.	"She Moved Through the Fair"	Traditional	Phil Coulter	4:20

French second edition
No.	Title	Writer(s)	Producer(s)	Length
1.	"Picture of You"	Paul Watkins, Paul Wilson, Nigel Kennedy, Ronan Keating	Absolute	3:28
2.	"Working My Way Back to You"	Sandy Linzer; Denny Randell	Ian Levine	3:49
3.	"Paradise"	Ronan Keating, Ray Hedges, Martin Brannigan	Hedges	3:30
4.	"A Different Beat"	Keating, Stephen Gately, Shane Lynch, Keith Duffy, Brannigan, Hedges	Hedges	4:17
5.	"Melting Pot"	Roger Cook, Roger Greenway	Hedges, Phil Harding, Ian Curnow	3:33
6.	"Ben"	Don Black, Walter Scharf	Ric Wake	2:47
7.	"Don't Stop Looking for Love"	Billy Mann, Brett Laurence	Wake	4:19
8.	"Isn't It a Wonder"	Keating, Hedges, Brannigan	Hedges	3:44
9.	"Words"	Barry Gibb, Robin Gibb, Maurice Gibb	Harding, Curnow	3:55
10.	"It's Time"	Keating, Gately, Lynch, Duffy, Hedges, Brannigan	Hedges	3:32
11.	"Games of Love"	Gately, Hedges, Brannigan	Hedges	3:44
12.	"Strong Enough"	Keating, Curnow, Julian Gallagher, Harding	Harding, Curnow	3:37
13.	"Heaven Knows"	Keating, Hedges, Brannigan	Hedges	4:02
14.	"Crying in the Night"	Keating, Gately, Lynch, Hedges, Brannigan	Hedges	3:03
15.	"Give a Little"	Gately, Hedges, Brannigan	Hedges	3:20
16.	"Love Me for a Reason"	Johnny Bristol, Wade Brown, David Jones Jr.	Ray Hedges	3:39
17.	"She Moves Through the Fair"	Traditional	Phil Coulter	4:25

New Version
No.	Title	Writer(s)	Producer(s)	Length
1.	"Picture of You"	Paul Watkins, Paul Wilson, Nigel Kennedy, Ronan Keating	Absolute	3:30
2.	"Paradise"	Ronan Keating, Ray Hedges, Martin Brannigan	Hedges	3:30
3.	"A Different Beat"	Keating, Stephen Gately, Shane Lynch, Keith Duffy, Brannigan, Hedges	Hedges	4:10
4.	"Melting Pot"	Roger Cook, Roger Greenway	Hedges, Phil Harding, Ian Curnow	3:33
5.	"Ben"	Don Black, Walter Scharf	Ric Wake	2:44
6.	"Don't Stop Looking for Love"	Billy Mann, Brett Laurence	Wake	4:12
7.	"Isn't It a Wonder"	Keating, Hedges, Brannigan	Hedges	3:30
8.	"Words"	Barry Gibb, Robin Gibb, Maurice Gibb	Harding, Curnow	3:55
9.	"It's Time"	Keating, Gately, Lynch, Duffy, Hedges, Brannigan	Hedges	3:32
10.	"Games of Love"	Gately, Hedges, Brannigan	Hedges	3:35
11.	"Strong Enough"	Keating, Curnow, Julian Gallagher, Harding	Harding, Curnow	3:37
12.	"Heaven Knows"	Keating, Hedges, Brannigan	Hedges	4:02
13.	"Crying in the Night"	Keating, Gately, Lynch, Hedges, Brannigan	Hedges	3:03
14.	"Give a Little"	Gately, Hedges, Brannigan	Hedges	3:20
15.	"She Moves Through the Fair"	Traditional	Phil Coulter	4:20

US edition
No.	Title	Writer(s)	Producer(s)	Length
1.	"Mystical Experience"	Chein García-Alonso	Ray Hedges, Rafael Pérez-Botija	4:09
2.	"A Different Beat"	Ronan Keating, Stephen Gately, Shane Lynch, Keith Duffy, Martin Brannigan, Hedges	Hedges	4:10
3.	"Paradise"	Keating, Hedges, Brannigan	Hedges	3:30
4.	"Melting Pot"	Roger Cook, Roger Greenway	Hedges, Phil Harding, Ian Curnow	3:33
5.	"Games of Love"	Gately, Hedges, Brannigan	Hedges	3:35
6.	"Ben"	Don Black, Walter Scharf	Ric Wake	2:44
7.	"Isn't It a Wonder"	Keating, Hedges, Brannigan	Hedges	3:30
8.	"Mystical Experience (Experiencia Religiosa)" (Spanglish)	Chein García-Alonso	Hedges, Pérez-Botija	4:14
9.	"Strong Enough"	Keating, Curnow, Julian Gallagher, Harding	Harding, Curnow	3:37
10.	"Words (Palabras)" (Spanglish)	Barry Gibb, Robin Gibb, Maurice Gibb	Hedges, Pérez-Botija	4:01
11.	"Give a Little"	Gately, Hedges, Brannigan	Hedges	3:20
12.	"Don't Stop Looking for Love"	Billy Mann, Brett Laurence	Wake	4:12

== Charts ==
=== Weekly charts ===
Chart (1996–97)	Peak position
Australian Albums (ARIA)	74
Austrian Albums (Ö3 Austria)	40
Belgian Albums (Ultratop Flanders)	37
Dutch Albums (Album Top 100)	78
Estonian Albums (Eesti Top 10)	6
European Albums Chart	15
French Albums (SNEP)	11
German Albums (Offizielle Top 100)	47
Greek Albums (IFPI Greece)	10
Irish Albums (IRMA)	2
Scottish Albums (OCC)	1
Singapore Albums (SPVA)	4
Swedish Albums (Sverigetopplistan)	44
Swiss Albums (Schweizer Hitparade)	21
Taiwanese Albums (IFPI)	8
UK Albums (Official Charts)	1

=== Year-end charts ===
Chart (1996)	Position
UK Albums (OCC)	17
Chart (1997)	Position
UK Albums (OCC)	99

== Certifications ==
Region	Certification	Certified units/sales
United Kingdom (BPI)	3× Platinum	900,000^{^}
Summaries
Europe (IFPI)	Platinum	1,000,000^{*}
^{*} Sales figures based on certification alone.^{^} Shipments figures based on certification alone.
