= Experiencia Religiosa =

Single by Enrique Iglesias

from the album Enrique Iglesias
- Released: 8 January 1996
- Recorded: 1995
- Genre: Latin pop; pop rock; gospel
- Length: 5:32
- Label: Fonovisa
- Songwriter: Chein García Alonso
- Producer: Rafael Pérez-Botija

Enrique Iglesias singles chronology
"Si Tú Te Vas" (1995)	"Experiencia Religiosa" (1996)	"Por Amarte" (1996)

Music video
- "Enrique Iglesias - Experiencia Religiosa" on YouTube

"Experiencia Religiosa" (English: Religious Experience) is the second single released by Spanish singer-songwriter Enrique Iglesias from his eponymous debut studio album Enrique Iglesias (1995), It was released by Fonovisa on 11 December 1995 (see 1995 in music). The song was awarded "Pop Song of the Year" at the Lo Nuestro Awards award, and the Music Video also was nominated for Video of the Year the previous year. The track was written by Chein García Alonso, produced by Rafael Pérez-Botija and became another successful release for Iglesias. The song includes a gospel arrangement on the choruses. An Italian version was also released on the Italian pressings of the album Enrique Iglesias. The track debuted in the United States Billboard Hot Latin Tracks chart at number 33 on 10 February 1996, while his previous single was at number 4 on the same chart. The track peaked at number 1, for three weeks on 20 April 1996. The single spent five weeks in Billboard's top 20 Mexican Regional Songs, peaking at number 2. According to the newspaper El Siglo de Torreón, the music was well performed in cities of: Chile, México, and Puerto Rico.

== Charts ==
Chart (1996)	Peak position
US Hot Latin Songs (Billboard)	1
US Latin Pop Airplay (Billboard)	2
US Regional Mexican Airplay (Billboard)	2
US Tropical Songs (Billboard)	15

== Boyzone version ==
"Mystical Experience"

Single by Boyzone

from the album A Different Beat (US Version)
- Released: 3 November 1997
- Recorded: 1996
- Genre: Latin pop
- Length: 4:11
- Label: Sony BMG
- Songwriter: Chein García Alonso
- Producer: Ray Hedges

Boyzone singles chronology
"Isn't It a Wonder" (1997)	"Mystical Experience" (1997)	"Picture of You" (1997)

Music video
- "Boyzone - Mystical Experience" on YouTube

Irish boy band Boyzone did an English-language cover of the song, titled "Mystical Experience". The track was released as the fourth and final single from their second studio album, A Different Beat (1996), however it only featured on the US version of the album. Subsequently, the single was only released in America. In the UK, a promotional disc was issued with their VHS Something Else, containing the song. It was also included as a B-side of "Baby Can I Hold You". The video for the track featured on the VHS. The video features the group performing in a suburban wasteland, which features a cameo from Enrique Iglesias himself. The group also did a version of the song in its native Spanish language, using the original Spanish title. This version was also included on the US version of A Different Beat and was included as the B-side to their previous single, "Isn't It a Wonder".

=== Track listing ===
'Something Else' promotional disc

1. "Mystical Experience" – 4:11

US CD1

1. "Mystical Experience" – 4:11
2. "Experiencia Religiosa" – 4:11

US CD2

1. "Mystical Experience" (SLI Dance Remix) – 4:11
2. "Mystical Experience" (Spanglish Version SLI Dance Remix) – 4:11
3. "Mystical Experience" (SLI Instrumental) – 4:11
4. "Mystical Experience" – 4:11
5. "Mystical Experience" (Spanglish Version) – 4:11

Cassette single

1. "Mystical Experience" – 4:11
2. "Experiencia Religiosa" – 4:11
3. "Mystical Experience" (SLI Dance Remix) – 4:11

=== Charts ===
Chart (1997)	Peak position
US Hot Latin Songs (Billboard)	4
US Latin Pop Airplay (Billboard)	5
US Tropical Airplay (Billboard)	7

== See also ==
- List of number-one Billboard Hot Latin Tracks of 1996
