= Isn't It a Wonder =

1997 single by Boyzone

Single by Boyzone

from the album A Different Beat
- B-side: "Experiencia Religiosa"; "Get Up and Get Over"; "Temptation"
- Released: 10 March 1997
- Studio: The Mothership (UK)
- Length: 3:37
- Label: Polydor
- Songwriters: Ronan Keating; Ray Hedges; Martin Brannigan
- Producers: Ray "Madman" Hedges; Mark "Spike" Stent (single version)

Boyzone singles chronology
"A Different Beat" (1996)	"Isn't It a Wonder" (1997)	"Picture of You" (1997)

Music video
- "Isn't It a Wonder" on YouTube

"Isn't It a Wonder" is a song by Irish boy band Boyzone from their second studio album, A Different Beat (1996). The song was written by Ronan Keating, Ray Hedges, and Martin Brannigan, and it was produced by Hedges and remixed by Mark "Spike" Stent for its single release. It was released as the album's third single on 10 March 1997 by Polydor Records. The single reached number two on the UK Singles Chart and number three on the Irish Singles Chart.

== Critical reception ==
Music Week gave "Isn't It a Wonder" a score of four out of five and named it Single of the Week. The reviewer complimenting it as "another faultless ballad", writing, "As they've already proved, this type of songwriting maturity has an appeal which stretches beyond their original young audience." Music Week editor Alan Jones described it as "a gentle, sweetly-sung ballad which their fans will love." Gavin Reeve from Smash Hits gave it a top score of five out of five, saying, "Yep, it's a slice of religious pop of biblical beauty. (Saint) Ronan sounds like an angel, with Steve singing 'on high' as usual. Play it loud, close your eyes and let the lads take you to a better place, where clouds are pillows and car alarms sound like gentle laughter...sorry, just drifted off for a minute. Stunning."

== Music video ==
The accompanying music video for "Isn't It a Wonder" shows four of the Boyzone members riding on a roofless car with Shane Lynch as the driver, Ronan Keating on the right front passenger seat, Stephen Gately on the right rear passenger seat and Mikey Graham on the left rear passenger seat, while Keith Duffy rides separately on a motorcycle. The four members stops at a nearby petrol station to meet up with Keith Duffy. They travel to certain places that are in the desert. Ronan Keating and Mikey Graham can be seen wearing cowboy hats.

== Track listings ==
- UK CD1 and Australian CD single
1. "Isn't It a Wonder" – 3:37
2. "Experiencia Religiosa" – 4:17
3. "Get Up and Get Over" – 3:14
- UK CD2
1. "Isn't It A Wonder" – 3:37
2. "A Different Beat" (live at Wembley) – 4:08
3. "Temptation" – 3:09
4. "Father and Son" (live at Wembley) – 2:48
- European CD single
1. "Isn't It a Wonder" – 3:37
2. "Experiencia Religiosa" – 4:17

== Credits and personnel ==
Credits are lifted from the A Different Beat album booklet and the UK CD1 liner notes.

Studio

- Recorded, produced, and arranged at The Mothership Studios (UK)

Personnel

- Ronan Keating – writing
- Ray Hedges – writing, production (as Ray "Madman" Hedges), arrangement
- Martin Brannigan – writing, arrangement
- Tracy Ackerman – additional backing vocals
- Andy Caine – additional backing vocals
- Mark "Spike" Stent – remixing (single version)

== Charts ==
=== Weekly charts ===
Chart (1997)	Peak position
Australia (ARIA)	113
Belgium (Ultratip Bubbling Under Flanders)	6
Estonia Airplay (Eesti Top 25)	24
Europe (Eurochart Hot 100)	13
Europe (European Hit Radio)	23
Germany (GfK)	49
Greece (IFPI Greece)	8
Ireland (IRMA)	3
Israel (Israeli Singles Chart)	6
Netherlands (Dutch Top 40 Tipparade)	8
Netherlands (Single Top 100)	65
Scottish Singles Sales (Official Charts)	2
Sweden (Sverigetopplistan)	59
UK Singles (Official Charts)	2
UK Airplay (Music Week)	6

=== Year-end charts ===
Chart (1997)	Position
UK Singles (OCC)	58

== Certifications ==
Region	Certification	Certified units/sales
United Kingdom (BPI)	Silver	200,000^{^}
^{^} Shipments figures based on certification alone.
