= Si Tú Te Vas (Enrique Iglesias song) =

Single by Enrique Iglesias

from the album Enrique Iglesias
- Released: 25 September 1995
- Studio: Phase One Studios, Toronto, Ontario, Canada
- Genre: Pop
- Length: 4:04
- Label: Fonovisa
- Songwriters: Enrique Iglesias; Roberto Morales
- Producer: Rafael Pérez-Botija

Enrique Iglesias singles chronology
"Si Tú Te Vas" (1995)	"Experiencia Religiosa" (1995)

Music video
- "Si Tú Te Vas" on YouTube

"Si Tú Te Vas" (English: "If You Go Away") is a song by Spanish singer Enrique Iglesias from his 1995 eponymous debut studio album. The song was co-written by Iglesias when he was 16 and his friend Roberto Morales with Rafael Pérez-Botija handling its production. It was released as the lead single from the album on 25 September 1995. Iglesias recorded a demo of the song which was accepted by Guillermo Santiso, the president of Fonovisa Records, which led to Iglesias signing on with the company. A pop ballad, the song is about a man inspired by love and is afraid of a farewell. A music video for the song was filmed in New York and led to Iglesias being nominated for Best New Artist at the 1996 MTV Latino Awards.

The song received mixed reactions with two music critics giving it a favorable review and was cited as one of Iglesias' 10 best tracks while a reviewer was not impressed by it. "Si Tú Te Vas" won the Lo Nuestro Award for Pop Song of the Year in 1996 as well as the Eres awards for Best Song and Best Video in the same year. The song was a recipient of an American Society of Composers, Authors and Publishers (ASCAP) Latin Award in 1996 and 1997. Commercially, it topped the Billboard Hot Latin Songs and Latin Pop Airplay charts in the United States. The track spent eight weeks at this position on the former chart and ranked number 6 on its year-end chart. It also topped the charts in Mexico, Panama and Puerto Rico; reached the top-ten in Belgium, El Salvador, Bolivia and Peru; and also peaked at number 27 in France.

== Background and composition ==
Enrique Iglesias, the youngest child of Spanish singer Julio Iglesias, began co-writing songs as a teenager with his friend Roberto Morales and continued to do so while studying at the University of Miami for business administration. One of the songs they wrote together when Iglesias was 16 was "Si Tú Te Vas". In 1994, Iglesias invited his father's publicist, Fernán Martinez, to listen to his music which Martinez enjoyed. When searching for a label to sign on, Iglesias asked Martinez to not his father's surname which led to Martinez auditioning the singer as a Colombian singer named "Enrique Martinez", adopting the publicist's surname. Iglesias borrowed $4,000 ($7,240 in 2021) from his nanny Elvira Olivares to record a demo of "Si Tú Te Vas" without his father's knowledge.

After being turned down by three major Latin music labels, Guillermo Santiso, the president of Fonovisa Records, was impressed with both the demo of the song and the photo of the artist. "The voice was very masculine and different" Santiso recalled and the artist was then signed on to the company. As Iglesias had not informed his parents that he began pursuing a music career, he could not record in either Spain or South America, which led him to doing it in Canada. The eponymous album, which was produced by Spanish musician Rafael Pérez-Botija, was released in late 1995. A pop ballad, "Si Tú Te Vas" speaks of a "sensitive young man, inspired by love and who shouts it (and sings it) to the four winds, and is in love to the core". He confesses that his fears about a farewell could "leave him adrift in his own sea of tears".

== Promotion and reception ==
"Si Tú Te Vas" was released as the lead single from the album on 25 September 1995. The music video was filmed in New York and premiered on 4 October 1995 as a screen projection on a side wall of the Pantages Theatre in Hollywood. It features an overhead light, a microphone, and a woman and several scenes in black and white. Iglesias is wearing trousers and a jacket with the wind blowing his hair at his forehead which Los 40 editor Juan Vicente commented that it "defined him as a Latin balladeer or crooner like his father". At the 1996 MTV Latino Awards, the video led to Iglesias being nominated for "Best New Artist", but lost to "De Repente" by Soraya. Iglesias performed "Si Tú Te Vas" live on Sábado Gigante in 1995, which Billboard contributor Angie Romero listed as one of the show's "10 Best Musical Moments". An Italian- and Portuguese-language version of the track was recorded under their respective titles, "Se Te Ne Vai" and "Se Você Se Vai". The song was later included on Iglesias' compilation albums The Best Hits (1999) and Enrique Iglesias: 95/08 Éxitos (2008). A remix version of the song was included on his album Remixes (1998). It was also featured on the compilation album La Historia de los Exitos (2009) by Fonovisa Records to celebrate the record label's 25th anniversary.

Thessa Mooij of Music & Media called the song a "perfect summertime blues ballad with plenty of drama and arrangements". An editor for El Nuevo Herald noted that it has an "enormous resemblance" to his father. The Democrat and Chronicle critic Manuel Rivera-Ortiz unfavorably considered the song to be "drippy and not as love-inspiring as it hopes to be". Los 40 writer Noemi Fernández listed it as one of Iglesias' ten best songs. At the 8th Annual Lo Nuestro Awards in 1996, it was awarded in the category of Pop Song of the Year. At the Premios Eres in the same year, it won "Best Song" and "Best Video". The track was recognized as one of the best-performing songs of the year on the Pop/Ballad field at the 1996 American Society of Composers, Authors and Publishers (ASCAP) Latin Awards and was awarded in the same category the following year.

In the US, "Si Tú Te Vas" debuted at number 22 on the Billboard Hot Latin Songs chart on the week of 14 October 1995. It reached the top of the chart on the week of 30 December 1995, where it spent a total of eight nonconsecutive weeks at this position. It also topped the Billboard Latin Pop Airplay chart for two weeks. The song also peaked at number three on the Regional Mexican Airplay chart. Fonovisa heavily promoted Iglesias on Regional Mexican radio stations which did not typically play pop music by non Mexican artists. "Si Tú Te Vas" ended 1996 as the sixth best-performing song on the Hot Latin Songs chart. It peaked at number two on the Mexican ballads chart with the top stop being held off by Marta Sánchez's song "Arena y Sol".

In Belgium, it peaked at number six and eight on the Ultratop charts in the Flanders and Wallonia regions, respectively. The song reached number 21 in France, where it received heavy rotations on the French radio networks RTL and NRJ. MCA Director of International Marketing Kate Farmer noted was "quite an unusual response for France" while label manager Sophie Louvet mentioned that the French media are "usually very slow. Sometimes it takes six months to get airplay or a review". The song was covered by Mexican band Paco Barron y sus Norteños Clan on their album Norteños de Pura Sangre (1996) as a Mexican cumbia medley. It was performed as part of a potpourri where the band performs other songs by Iglesias under the title "Potpourri de Quique". The medley peaked at number 10 and 7 on the Hot Latin Songs and Regional Mexican charts, respectively, and led to Iglesias and Morales being awarded an ASCAP Latin Award in 1998 on the Regional Mexican field.

== Charts ==
=== Weekly charts ===
Chart performance for "Si Tú Te Vas"
Chart (1995–96)	Peak position
Belgium (Ultratop 50 Flanders)	6
Belgium (Ultratop 50 Wallonia)	8
Bolivia (UPI)	2
El Salvador (UPI)	2
Europe (European Hot 100 Singles)	80
France (SNEP)	21
Mexico (AMPROFON)	1
Panama (UPI)	1
Peru (UPI)	2
Puerto Rico (UPI)	1
US Hot Latin Songs (Billboard)	1
US Latin Pop Airplay (Billboard)	1
US Regional Mexican Airplay (Billboard)	3

2026 weekly chart performance
Chart (2026)	Peak position
El Salvador Airplay (ASAP EGC)	9

=== Year-end charts ===
1996 year-end chart performance for "Si Tú Te Vas"
Chart (1996)	Position
Belgium (Ultratop 50 Flanders)	25
Belgium (Ultratop 50 Wallonia)	37
US Hot Latin Songs (Billboard)	6

=== All-time charts ===
Chart (2016)	Position
US Hot Latin Songs (Billboard)	42

== See also ==
- Billboard Hot Latin Songs Year-End Chart
- List of number-one Billboard Hot Latin Tracks of 1995
- List of number-one Billboard Hot Latin Tracks of 1996
- List of Billboard Latin Pop Airplay number ones of 1996
