= Como Te Extraño =

Single by Pete Astudillo

from the album Como Te Extraño
- Released: October 1995
- Recorded: April 1995
- Genre: Mexican cumbia, Tejano
- Length: 4:40
- Label: EMI Latin
- Songwriters: A.B. Quintanilla, Pete Astudillo, Joe Ojeda
- Producer: A.B. Quintanilla III

Pete Astudillo singles chronology
"No Es Como Tu" (1994)	"Como Te Extraño" (1995)	"Si No Fui Yo" (1996)

"Como Te Extraño" (English: How Much I Miss You) is a song recorded by American Tejano singer Pete Astudillo for his second studio album of the same name (1995). The song was released as the lead single by EMI Latin. It was composed by Astudillo and former Selena y Los Dinos band members; A.B. Quintanilla and Joe Ojeda. The recording is a tribute song for American Tejano singer Selena, who was killed in March 1995. Selena was the lead vocalist of Selena y Los Dinos, while Astudillo was the backup dancer of the group and occasional duet partner with Selena.

The song peaked at number two on the US Billboard Hot Latin Tracks and number-one on the US Billboard Regional Mexican Airplay chart, giving Astudillo his first and only number-one single. Astudillo performed the recording during the live televised concert, Selena ¡VIVE!, on April 5, 2005.

== Charts ==
Chart (1995/1996)	Peak position
US Billboard Hot Latin Tracks	2
US Billboard Regional Mexican Airplay	1
