= Enrique Iglesias discography =

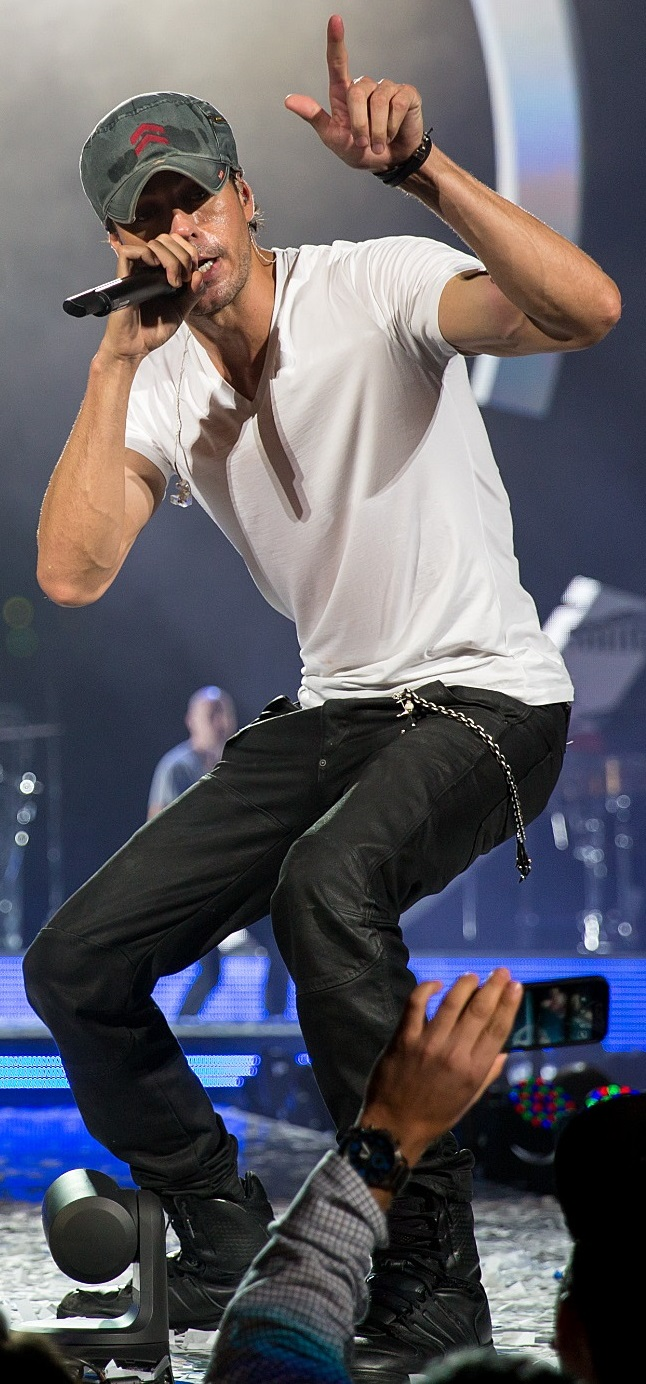
- Enrique Iglesias receiving multi-platinum sales award
- Studio albums: 12
- Compilation albums: 7
- Singles: 62
- Music videos: 80

Spanish singer Enrique Iglesias has released 12 studio albums, five compilation albums, 62 singles (including 8 as a featured artist), and 80 music videos. Iglesias started his career in 1995 with his first Spanish album and self-titled album Enrique Iglesias, which produced five number-ones on the Hot Latin Tracks chart and won a Grammy Award for Best Latin Pop Album in 1997. In 1999, he released his first English album Enrique, which included the song "Bailamos" from the film Wild Wild West. The album produced two number-one Billboard Hot 100 tracks. In 2001, Enrique released Escape which has sold over 8 million copies worldwide.

In July 2010, Iglesias released his ninth studio effort, Euphoria, which was his first bilingual album. The album produced three consecutive number-ones on the Hot Dance Club Songs chart and the album was nominated for a Latin Grammy Award for Album of the Year.

He has sold over 70 million records worldwide, making him one of the best-selling Latin music artists. He has had five Billboard Hot 100 top five singles, including two number-ones and holds the record for producing 27 number-one Spanish-language singles on the Billboard's Hot Latin Tracks chart.

== Albums ==
=== Studio albums ===
List of albums, with selected chart positions, and certifications
Title	Album details	Peak chart positions										Certifications
Title	Album details	SPA	AUS	AUT	CAN	FRA	GER	NLD	SWI	UK	US	Certifications
Enrique Iglesias	Released: 21 November 1995; Label: Fonovisa; Format: CD, cassette, digital download	5	188	—	—	—	—	67	—	—	148	PROMUSICAE: 3× Platinum; RIAA: Platinum
Vivir	Released: 21 January 1997; Label: Fonovisa; Format: CD, digital download	3	167	—	—	—	—	—	—	—	33	PROMUSICAE: Platinum; RIAA: Platinum
Cosas Del Amor	Released: 22 September 1998; Label: Fonovisa; Format: CD, digital download	8	—	—	—	60	—	25	16	—	64	PROMUSICAE: Platinum; RIAA: Gold
Enrique	Released: 23 November 1999; Label: Interscope; Format: CD, digital download	1	11	12	4	51	7	13	3	80	33	PROMUSICAE: 4× Platinum; ARIA: Platinum; BPI: Gold; BVMI: Platinum; IFPI SWI: Platinum; MC: 5× Platinum; RIAA: Platinum; SNEP: Gold
Escape	Released: 30 October 2001; Label: Interscope; Format: CD, digital download	3	1	6	1	19	3	5	4	1	2	PROMUSICAE: Platinum; ARIA: 5× Platinum; BPI: 5× Platinum; BVMI: Platinum; IFPI AUT: Gold; IFPI SWI: 2× Platinum; MC: 5× Platinum; RIAA: 4× Platinum; RMNZ: Platinum
Quizás	Released: 17 September 2002; Label: Universal Music Latino; Format: CD, digital download	1	—	—	30	—	—	—	41	148	12	PROMUSICAE: Platinum; RIAA: Gold
7	Released: 25 November 2003; Label: Interscope; Format: CD, digital download	31	15	48	—	142	27	44	11	13	31	PROMUSICAE: Gold; ARIA: Platinum; BPI: Gold; IFPI SWI: Gold; MC: Platinum
Insomniac	Released: 12 June 2007; Label: Interscope; Format: CD, digital download	8	44	14	—	36	14	6	8	3	17	BPI: Gold
Euphoria	Released: 6 July 2010; Label: Universal Republic, Universal Music Latino; Format: CD, digital download	1	5	37	12	10	87	5	4	6	10	ARIA: Gold; BPI: Gold; MC: Gold; RIAA: 2× Platinum (Latin); SNEP: Gold
Sex and Love	Released: 18 March 2014; Label: Republic Records, Universal Music Latino; Format: CD, digital download	1	23	38	8	33	32	27	23	11	8	PROMUSICAE: Gold; BPI: Silver; IFPI AUT: Gold; MC: Gold; RIAA: 2× Platinum (Latin); SNEP: Gold
Final (Vol. 1)	Released: 17 September 2021; Label: Sony Music; Format: CD, digital download	45	—	—	—	—	—	—	56	—	—	MC: Gold; RIAA: 6× Platinum (Latin); SNEP: Gold
Final (Vol. 2)	Released: 29 March 2024; Label: Sony Music; Format: CD, digital download	26	—	—	—	—	—	—	40	—	—	RIAA: Gold (Latin)
"—" denotes releases that did not chart or were not released in that territory.

=== Compilation albums ===
List of albums, with selected chart positions, and certifications
Title	Album details	Peak chart positions									Certifications
Title	Album details	SPA	AUS	FRA	GER	NLD	SWI	UK	US	US Latin	Certifications
Remixes	Released: 5 May 1998; Label: Fonovisa; Format: CD, cassette	—	—	—	—	—	—	—	—	11	
Bailamos Greatest Hits	Released: 1 June 1999; Label: Fonovisa; Format: CD, cassette	—	—	—	—	—	—	—	65	1	RIAA: Gold
The Best Hits	Released: 24 November 1999; Label: Fonovisa; Format: CD, cassette	—	—	—	—	—	—	—	175	2	RIAA: Gold
15 Kilates Musicales	Released: 27 March 2001; Label: Fonovisa; Format: CD	—	—	—	—	—	—	—	—	—	
95/08 Éxitos	Released: 25 March 2008; Label: Universal Music Latino; Format: CD, digital download	12	—	—	—	—	—	—	18	1	RIAA: 2× Platinum (Latin)
Greatest Hits	Released: 11 November 2008; Label: Interscope; Format: CD, digital download	—	65	2	82	4	24	3	80	—	BPI: 2× Platinum; SNEP: Gold
Greatest Hits	Released: 4 October 2019; Label: Universal Music Latino; Format: CD, digital download	64	—	—	—	—	—	—	—	17	
"—" denotes releases that did not chart or were not released in that territory.

== Singles ==
=== As lead artist ===
List of singles, with selected chart positions, and certifications
Title	Year	Peak chart positions										Certifications	Album
Title	Year	SPA	AUS	AUT	CAN	FRA	GER	NL	SWI	UK	US	Certifications	Album
"Si Tú Te Vas"	1995	—	—	—	—	21	—	—	—	—	—		Enrique Iglesias
"Experiencia Religiosa"	1996	—	—	—	—	—	—	—	—	—	—		Enrique Iglesias
"Por Amarte"	1996	—	—	—	—	—	—	—	—	—	—		Enrique Iglesias
"No Llores Por Mí"	1996	—	—	—	—	—	—	—	—	—	—		Enrique Iglesias
"Trapecista"	1996	—	—	—	—	—	—	—	—	—	—		Enrique Iglesias
"Enamorado Por Primera Vez"	1997	—	—	—	—	—	—	—	—	—	—		Vivir
"Sólo En Ti"	1997	—	—	—	—	—	—	—	—	—	—		Vivir
"Miente"	1997	—	—	—	—	—	—	—	—	—	—		Vivir
"Revolución"	1997	—	—	—	—	—	—	—	—	—	—		Vivir
"Lluvia Cae"	1997	—	—	—	—	—	—	—	—	—	—		Vivir
"Al Despertar"	1998	—	—	—	—	—	—	—	—	—	—		Vivir
"Esperanza"	1998	—	—	—	—	—	—	—	—	—	—		Cosas Del Amor
"Nunca Te Olvidaré"	1999	—	—	—	—	—	—	—	—	—	—		Cosas Del Amor
"Bailamos"	1999	1	13	17	2	6	10	4	8	4	1	PROMUSICAE: Gold; ARIA: Gold; BPI: Gold; RMNZ: Gold; SNEP: Silver	Enrique
"Rhythm Divine" / "Ritmo Total"	1999	1	36	26	7	27	24	20	11	45	32	RMNZ: Gold	Enrique
"Be with You" / "Sólo Me Importas Tú"	2000	4	36	26	2	43	20	47	21	—	1		Enrique
"You're My #1" (featuring Sandy & Junior or Alsou or Valen Hsu)	2000	—	—	—	—	—	—	—	—	—	—		Enrique
"Could I Have This Kiss Forever" (with Whitney Houston)	2000	4	12	8	8	16	5	1	1	7	52	ARIA: Gold; BVMI: Gold; IFPI SWI: Gold; RMNZ: Gold; SNEP: Silver	Enrique
"Sad Eyes"	2000	—	104	—	36	—	—	—	43	—	— (Note: "Sad Eyes" did not enter the Billboard Hot 100, but peaked at number 23 on the Bubbling Under Hot 100 Singles chart.)		Enrique
"Hero" / "Héroe"	2001	1	1	3	1	43	3	3	1	1	3	ARIA: 2× Platinum; BPI: 3× Platinum; BVMI: Platinum; IFPI AUT: Gold; IFPI SWI: Platinum; RMNZ: Platinum	Escape
"Escape" / "Escapar"	2002	9	7	5	—	—	6	3	11	3	12	ARIA: Platinum; BPI: Gold; RMNZ: Gold	Escape
"Don't Turn Off the Lights" / "No Apagues La Luz"	2002	—	8	—	—	—	—	—	—	—	— (Note: "Don't Turn Off the Lights" did not enter the Billboard Hot 100, but peaked at number 10 on the Bubbling Under Hot 100 Singles chart.)	ARIA: Gold	Escape
"Love to See You Cry"	2002	19	61	—	17	17	53	25	35	12	—		Escape
"Maybe"	2002	—	41	—	—	—	62	21	44	12	—		Escape
"Mentiroso"	2002	—	—	—	—	—	—	—	—	—	— (Note: "Mentiroso" did not enter the Billboard Hot 100, but peaked at number five on the Bubbling Under Hot 100 Singles chart.)		Quizás
"Quizás"	2002	—	—	—	—	—	—	—	—	—	— (Note: "Quizás" did not enter the Billboard Hot 100, but peaked at number 21 on the Bubbling Under Hot 100 Singles chart.)		Quizás
"Para Qué La Vida"	2003	—	—	—	—	—	—	—	—	—	— (Note: "Para Qué La Vida" did not enter the Billboard Hot 100, but peaked at number two on the Bubbling Under Hot 100 Singles chart.)		Quizás
"Addicted" / "Adicto"	2003	—	43	51	—	—	31	42	34	11	— (Note: "Addicted" did not enter the Billboard Hot 100, but peaked at number one on the Bubbling Under Hot 100 Singles chart.)		7
"Not in Love" / "No Es Amor" (featuring Kelis)	2004	—	15	36	—	36	14	6	14	5	— (Note: "Not in Love" did not enter the Billboard Hot 100, but peaked at number 18 on the Bubbling Under Hot 100 Singles chart.)	ARIA: Gold	7
"Do You Know? (The Ping Pong Song)" / "Dímelo"	2007	—	—	8	19	9	6	2	4	3	21	BPI: Gold; BVMI: Gold	Insomniac
"Somebody's Me" / "Alguien Soy Yo"	2007	—	—	—	31	—	—	48	—	—	— (Note: "Somebody's Me" did not enter the Billboard Hot 100, but peaked at number six on the Bubbling Under Hot 100 Singles chart.)		Insomniac
"Tired of Being Sorry" (featuring Nâdiya) / "Amigo Vulnerable"	2007	—	—	—	71	1	46	3	6	20	—	SNEP: Gold	Insomniac
"Push" (featuring Lil Wayne)	2008	—	—	—	—	—	—	—	—	—	—		Insomniac
"¿Dónde Están Corazón?"	2008	—	—	—	—	—	—	—	—	—	— (Note: "¿Dónde Están Corazón?" did not enter the Billboard Hot 100, but peaked at number three on the Bubbling Under Hot 100 Singles chart.)		95/08 Éxitos
"Lloro Por Ti" (featuring Wisin & Yandel)	2008	—	—	—	—	—	—	—	—	—	91		95/08 Éxitos
"Can You Hear Me"	2008	—	—	17	—	21	14	1	2	—	—		Greatest Hits
"Away" (featuring Sean Garrett)	2008	—	—	—	—	—	—	49	—	—	—		Greatest Hits
"Takin' Back My Love" (featuring Ciara)	2009	—	200	19	—	2	9	5	23	12	—	BPI: Silver	Greatest Hits
"Cuando Me Enamoro" (featuring Juan Luis Guerra)	2010	6	—	—	—	—	—	—	—	—	89	PROMUSICAE: Platinum	Euphoria
"I Like It" (featuring Pitbull)	2010	4	2	6	1	2	10	13	6	4	4	PROMUSICAE: Platinum; ARIA: 3× Platinum; BPI: Platinum; BVMI: Gold; IFPI AUT: Gold; IFPI SWI: Gold; MC: 3× Platinum; RIAA: 3× Platinum; RMNZ: Gold	Euphoria
"Heartbeat" (featuring Nicole Scherzinger)	2010	—	5	—	72	4	—	20	—	8	—	ARIA: 2× Platinum; BPI: Silver; RMNZ: Platinum	Euphoria
"No Me Digas Que No" (featuring Wisin & Yandel)	2010	—	—	—	—	—	—	—	—	—	— (Note: "No Me Digas Que No" did not enter the Billboard Hot 100, but peaked at number 21 on the Bubbling Under Hot 100 Singles chart.)		Euphoria
"Tonight (I'm Lovin' You)" (featuring Ludacris and DJ Frank E)	2010	2	2	6	3	26	12	11	4	5	4	PROMUSICAE: Gold; ARIA: 2× Platinum; BPI: Gold; BVMI: Gold; IFPI AUT: Gold; MC: 3× Platinum; RIAA: 3× Platinum; RMNZ: Platinum	Euphoria
"Dirty Dancer" (with Usher featuring Lil Wayne)	2011	20	24	14	11	99	17	25	30	21	18	ARIA: Platinum; MC: 2× Platinum; RIAA: Gold	Euphoria
"Ayer"	2011	—	—	—	—	—	—	—	—	—	—		Euphoria
"I Like How It Feels" (featuring Pitbull and The WAV.s)	2011	14	—	—	11	—	—	37	—	—	74	ARIA: Gold; MC: Platinum; RMNZ: Gold	Sex and Love
"Finally Found You" (featuring Sammy Adams)	2012	31	33	—	11	—	—	54	—	—	24	ARIA: Platinum; RIAA: Gold	Sex and Love
"Turn the Night Up"	2013	41	54	—	37	—	—	—	—	—	61		Sex and Love
"Loco" (featuring Romeo Santos)	2013	1	—	—	—	—	—	—	—	—	80	PROMUSICAE: Gold	Sex and Love
"Heart Attack"	2013	—	—	—	83	—	—	—	—	—	88		Sex and Love
"El Perdedor" (featuring Marco Antonio Solís)	2013	—	—	—	—	—	—	—	—	—	85		Sex and Love
"I'm a Freak" (featuring Pitbull)	2014	17	45	39	52	—	56	—	—	4	—	BPI: Silver	Sex and Love
"Bailando" (featuring Descemer Bueno and Gente de Zona)	2014	1	52	42	19	12	31	3	4	75	12	PROMUSICAE: 8× Platinum; ARIA: Gold; BPI: Platinum; BVMI: Platinum; IFPI SWI: Platinum; MC: 2× Platinum; NVPI: Platinum; RIAA: 4× Platinum; RMNZ: Platinum	Sex and Love
"Noche y De Día" (featuring Yandel and Juan Magan)	2015	5	—	—	—	—	—	—	—	—	—	PROMUSICAE: Platinum	Sex and Love
"El Perdón" (with Nicky Jam)	2015	1	—	9	85	1	8	1	1	—	56	PROMUSICAE: 6× Platinum; BPI: Silver; BVMI: 3× Gold; IFPI AUT: Gold; IFPI SWI: 3× Platinum; MC: 2× Platinum; RIAA: 27× Platinum (Latin); SNEP: Diamond	Fénix
"Duele el Corazón" (featuring Wisin)	2016	1	—	6	—	3	8	12	1	—	82	PROMUSICAE: 6× Platinum; BPI: Silver; BVMI: Gold; IFPI AUT: Platinum; IFPI SWI: 4× Platinum; MC: Platinum; RIAA: 12× Platinum (Latin); SNEP: Diamond	Final (Vol. 1)
"Súbeme la Radio" (featuring Descemer Bueno and Zion & Lennox)	2017	1	141	7	71	8	15	10	3	10	81	PROMUSICAE: 5× Platinum; BPI: Platinum; BVMI: Platinum; IFPI AUT: Platinum; IFPI SWI: 4× Platinum; MC: 2× Platinum; RIAA: 4× Platinum (Latin); SNEP: Platinum	Final (Vol. 1)
"El Baño" (featuring Bad Bunny)	2018	2	—	—	—	100	—	—	21	—	98	PROMUSICAE: Platinum; IFPI SWI: Gold; MC: Gold	Final (Vol. 1)
"Nos Fuimos Lejos" (with Descemer Bueno featuring El Micha)	2018	—	—	—	—	—	—	—	—	—	—	RIAA: Platinum (Latin)	Non-album single
"Move to Miami" (featuring Pitbull)	2018	91	—	—	—	—	—	—	81	—	—	MC: Gold	Final (Vol. 1)
"I Don't Dance (Without You)" (with Matoma featuring Konshens)	2018	—	—	—	—	—	—	—	—	—	—		One in a Million
"Después Que Te Perdí" (with Jon Z)	2019	—	—	—	—	—	—	—	—	—	—		Non-album single
"Me Pasé" (featuring Farruko)	2021	74	—	—	—	—	—	19	75	—	—	PROMUSICAE: Gold	Final (Vol. 1)
"Pendejo"	2021	—	—	—	—	—	—	—	—	—	—		Final (Vol. 1)
"Chasing the Sun"	2021	—	—	—	—	—	—	—	—	—	—		Final (Vol. 1)
"Te Fuiste" (featuring Myke Towers)	2021	—	—	—	—	—	—	—	—	—	—		Final (Vol. 1)
"Espacio en Tu Corazón"	2022	—	—	—	—	—	—	—	—	—	—		Final (Vol. 2)
"Asi Es La Vida" (with María Becerra)	2023	25	—	—	—	—	—	—	—	—	—	PROMUSICAE: 2× Platinum; RIAA: 3× Platinum (Latin)	Final (Vol. 2)
"Fría" (with Yotuel)	2024	—	—	—	—	—	—	—	—	—	—		Final (Vol. 2)
"Space in My Heart" (with Miranda Lambert)	2024	—	—	—	—	—	—	—	—	—	—		Final (Vol. 2)
"Tamo Bien" (with Pitbull and IAmChino)	2025	—	—	—	—	100	—	—	—	—	—	RIAA: Gold (Latin); SNEP: Gold	Underdogs and Pitcoin
"—" denotes releases that did not chart or were not released in that territory.

=== As featured artist ===
List of singles, with selected chart positions
Title	Year	Peak chart positions									Certifications	Album
Title	Year	SPA	AUS	AUT	CAN	FRA	GER	SWI	US	US Latin	Certifications	Album
"To Love a Woman" (Lionel Richie featuring Enrique Iglesias)	2003	—	—	50	—	—	52	14	—	—		Encore
"Gracias a Tí" (Wisin & Yandel featuring Enrique Iglesias)	2009	—	—	—	—	—	—	—	— (Note: "Gracias a Tí" did not enter the Billboard Hot 100, but peaked at number 16 on the Bubbling Under Hot 100 Singles chart.)	1		La Revolución
"We Are the World 25 for Haiti" (among Artists for Haiti)	2010	15	18	—	7	7	—	—	2	—		Non-album single
"Naked" (Dev with Enrique Iglesias)	2011	—	—	—	54	—	—	—	99	—		The Night the Sun Came Up
"I Like" (The Remix) (Pitbull featuring Enrique Iglesias and Afrojack)	2012	—	—	—	—	—	—	—	—	—		Non-album single
"Messin' Around" (Pitbull featuring Enrique Iglesias)	2016	49	—	—	51	—	—	—	64	—	RIAA: Platinum	Climate Change
"Don't You Need Somebody" (RedOne featuring Enrique Iglesias, R.City, Sereyah and Shaggy)	2016	18	—	—	—	150	—	19	—	—		Non-album singles
"Lalala" (Remix) (Y2K and bbno$ featuring Enrique Iglesias and Carly Rae Jepsen)	2019	—	—	—	—	—	—	—	—	—		Non-album singles
"—" denotes releases that did not chart or were not released in that territory.

=== Promotional singles ===
List of promotional singles, with selected chart positions
Title	Year	Peak chart positions			Album
Title	Year	AUS	IRE	UK	Album
"Muñeca Cruel"	1996	—	—	—	Enrique Iglesias
"La Chica De Ayer"	2002	—	—	—	Quizás
"Beautiful" (with Kylie Minogue)	2014	47	—	—	Sex and Love
"There Goes My Baby" (featuring Flo Rida)	2014	—	57	50	Sex and Love
"Let Me Be Your Lover" (featuring Pitbull)	2014	—	—	—	Sex and Love
"—" denotes releases that did not chart or were not released in that territory.

== Other charted songs ==
List of other charted singles, with selected chart positions, showing year released and album name
Title	Year	Peak chart positions					Certifications	Album
Title	Year	SPA	CAN	SWI	US	US Latin	Certifications	Album
"Come n Go" (with Pitbull)	2011	—	76	—	—	—		Planet Pit
"Fútbol y Rumba" (Anuel AA featuring Enrique Iglesias)	2020	6	—	96	— (Note: "Fútbol y Rumba" has not entered the Billboard Hot 100, but has peaked at number 12 on the Bubbling Under Hot 100 Singles chart.)	8	PROMUSICAE: Platinum	Emmanuel

== Other appearances ==
List of non-single guest appearances, with other performing artists, showing year released and album name
Title	Year	Other performer(s)	Album
"The Power of Peace"	1996	Gerald Levert, Chris de Burgh, Oleta Adams, Aretha Franklin, Peabo Bryson	Power of Peace: In Support of CARE
"Miss You"	2008	Nâdiya	Électron Libre
"It Must Be Love"	2010	none	Download To Donate For Haiti
"How To Love" (Remix)	2011	Lil Wayne	none
"It Must Be Love"	2011	none	Download To Donate For Haiti V2.0
"Addicted" (Remix)	2011	none	Download To Donate: Tsunami Relief
"Tchu Tchu Tcha"	2012	Pitbull	Global Warming

== Music videos ==
Year	Video	Album	Director
1995	"Si Tú Te Vas"	Enrique Iglesias	Jon Small
1996	"Experiencia Religiosa"	Enrique Iglesias	Jon Small
1996	"Trapecista"	Enrique Iglesias	Jon Small
1997	"Enamorado Por Primera Vez"	Vivir	Jane Simpson
1997	"Sólo En Ti"	Vivir	Fernan Martínez
1997	"Mystical Experience" (Cameo appearance, with Boyzone)	A Different Beat (US version)	-
1998	"Esperanza"	Cosas Del Amor	Jaume Collet-Serra
1999	"Nunca Te Olvidaré"	Cosas Del Amor	Julián Pastor
1999	"Ruleta Rusa"	Cosas Del Amor	J.C. Barros
1999	"Wild Wild West" (Cameo appearance, with Will Smith)	Wild Wild West Soundtrack	Paul Hunter
1999	"Bailamos" (Original version)	Cosas Del Amor	Christophe Gstalder
1999	"Bailamos" (Wild Wild West version)	Cosas Del Amor	Nigel Dick
1999	"Bailamos" (3rd version)	Cosas Del Amor	Paul Hunter
1999	"Rhythm Divine" / "Ritmo Total"	Enrique	Francis Lawrence
2000	"Be with You" / "Sólo Me Importas Tú"	Enrique	Dave Meyers
2000	"Could I Have This Kiss Forever" (with Whitney Houston)	Enrique	Francis Lawrence
2000	"Sad Eyes" / "Más Es Amar"	Enrique	David LaChapelle
2000	"You're My #1" (featuring Sandy & Junior)	Enrique	-
2000	"You're My #1" (featuring Valen Hsu)	Enrique	-
2000	"You're My #1" (featuring Alsou)	Enrique	-
2001	"Hero" / "Héroe"	Escape	Joseph Kahn
2002	"Escape"	Escape	Dave Meyers
2002	"Don't Turn Off the Lights" (1st version and 2nd version)	Escape	Marc Klasfeld
2002	"Love to See You Cry" (Original version, French version and Remix version)	Escape	Matthew Rolston
2002	"Maybe"	Escape	Simon Brand
2002	"Mentiroso"	Quizás	Simon Brand
2002	"Quizás"	Quizás	Simon Brand
2003	"Para Qué la Vida"	Quizás	Simon Brand
2003	"To Love a Woman" (with Lionel Richie)	Escape	Simon Brand
2003	"Addicted" (US version and UK version)	7	Peter Berg
2003	"Adicto"	7	Peter Berg
2004	"Not in Love" (featuring Kelis)	7	Jake Nava
2007	"Do You Know? (The Ping Pong Song)" / "Dímelo"	Insomniac	Jessy Terrero
2007	"Somebody's Me" / "Alguien Soy Yo"	Insomniac	Anthony Mandler
2007	"Tired of Being Sorry"	Insomniac	Jessy Terrero
2008	"Push" (featuring Lil Wayne / Prophet)	Insomniac	Billy Woodruff
2008	"Can You Hear Me"	Greatest Hits	Paul Minor
2008	"Tired of Being Sorry (Laisse Le Destin L'emporter)" (featuring Nâdiya)	Électron Libre	-
2008	"Away" (featuring Sean Garrett)	Greatest Hits	Anthony Mandler
2008	"¿Dónde Están Corazón?"	95/08 Éxitos	Paul Minor
2008	"Lloro Por Ti" (Original version and Remix version featuring Wisin & Yandel)	95/08 Éxitos	Paul Minor
2009	"Takin' Back My Love" (featuring Ciara / Sarah Connor)	Greatest Hits	Ray Kay
2009	"Gracias a Ti" (Remix, with Wisin & Yandel)	La Revolución: Evolution	Jessy Terrero
2010	"Cuando Me Enamoro" (featuring Juan Luis Guerra)	Euphoria	Jessy Terrero
2010	"I Like It" (featuring Pitbull)	Euphoria	Wayne Isham
2010	"I Like It" (Jersey Shore version, featuring Pitbull)	Euphoria	David Rousseau
2010	"Heartbeat" (Original version featuring Nicole Scherzinger and 'India Mix' version featuring Sunidhi Chauhan)	Euphoria	Hiro Murai
2010	"No Me Digas Que No" (Original version featuring Wisin & Yandel and solo version)	Euphoria	Jessy Terrero
2010	"Tonight I'm F**kin' You" (Lyric video, featuring Ludacris and DJ Frank E)	Euphoria	-
2010	"Tonight I'm F**kin' You" / "Tonight I'm Lovin' You" (featuring Ludacris and DJ Frank E)	Euphoria	BBGun & Parris
2011	"Dirty Dancer" (featuring Usher and Lil Wayne)	Euphoria	Yasha Malekzad, Jeff Dotson and Ethan Lader
2011	"Ayer"	Euphoria	Evan Winter
2011	"I Like How It Feels" (featuring Pitbull & The WAV.s)	Sex and Love	Enrique Iglesias
2011	"Naked" (with Dev)	The Night the Sun Came Up	BBGun
2012	"Finally Found You" (Lyric video, featuring Sammy Adams)	Sex and Love	-
2012	"Tchu Tchu Tcha" (The Global Warming Listening Party video, with Pitbull)	Global Warming	Don Tyler
2012	"Finally Found You" (featuring Sammy Adams / Daddy Yankee)	Sex and Love	Diego Hurtado de Mendoza
2013	"Turn the Night Up" (Fan version)	Sex and Love	Lior Molho
2013	"Turn the Night Up"	Sex and Love	Yasha Malekzad
2013	"Loco" (featuring Romeo Santos)	Sex and Love	Yasha Malekzad
2013	"Heart Attack" (Lyric video)	Sex and Love	-
2013	"Heart Attack"	Sex and Love	Colin Tilley
2014	"El Perdedor" (Original version and Bachata version, featuring Marco Antonio Solís)	Sex and Love	Jessy Terrero
2014	"I'm a Freak" (featuring Pitbull)	Sex and Love	Colin Tilley
2014	"I'm a Freak" (Lyric video, featuring Pitbull)	Sex and Love	-
2014	"Bailando" (featuring Descemer Bueno and Gente de Zona)	Sex and Love	Alejandro Pérez
2014	"Bailando" (English version, featuring Sean Paul, Descemer Bueno and Gente de Zona)	Sex and Love	Alejandro Pérez
2014	"Bailando" (Brazilian version, featuring Luan Santana, Descemer Bueno and Gente de Zona)	Sex and Love	Alejandro Pérez
2014	"Bailando" (Portuguese version, featuring Mickael Carreira, Descemer Bueno and Gente de Zona)	Sex and Love	Alejandro Pérez
2014	"Bailando" (Portuguese version lyric video, featuring Luan Santana)	Sex and Love	-
2014	"Bailando" (Brazilian version lyric video, featuring Mickael Carreira)	Sex and Love	-
2015	"Let Me Be Your Lover" (featuring Pitbull)	Sex and Love	Alejandro Pérez
2015	"Noche y Dia" (released as "Noche y de Dia", featuring Yandel and Juan Magan)	Sex and Love	Alejandro Pérez
2015	"El Perdón/Forgiveness" (with Nicky Jam)		Jonathan Craven and Darren Craig
2016	"Messin' Around" (with Pitbull)	Climate Change	David Rousseau
2016	"Duele El Corazon" (featuring Wisin)		Alejandro Pérez
2017	"Súbeme La Radio" (featuring Descemer Bueno and Zion & Lennox)		Alejandro Pérez
2018	"El Baño" (featuring Bad Bunny)		Enrique Iglesias and Maxim Bohichik
2018	"Nos Fuimos Lejos" (with Descemer Bueno featuring El Micha)		Pedro Vázquez
2018	"Move to Miami" (featuring Pitbull)		Fernando Lugo
2019	"Después Que Te Perdí" (with Jon Z)		Alejandro Pérez
2023	"Así Es La Vida" (with María Becerra)		Maxim Bohichik
