= List of number-one Billboard Latin Pop Airplay songs of 2021 =

The Billboard Latin Pop Airplay is a subchart of the Latin Airplay chart that ranks the most-played Latin pop songs on Latin radio stations. Published by Billboard magazine, the data are compiled by Nielsen SoundScan based collectively on each single's weekly airplay.

== Chart history ==
Issue date	Song	Artist	Ref
January 2	"Perfecta"	Luis Fonsi and Farruko	
January 9	"Despeinada"	Ozuna and Camilo	
January 16	"Despeinada"	Ozuna and Camilo	
January 23	"Vida de Rico"	Camilo	
January 30	"Vida de Rico"	Camilo	
February 6	"Despeinada"	Ozuna and Camilo	
February 13	"Despeinada"	Ozuna and Camilo	
February 20	"Chica Ideal"	Guaynaa and Sebastián Yatra	
February 27	"Chica Ideal"	Guaynaa and Sebastián Yatra	
March 6	"Chica Ideal"	Guaynaa and Sebastián Yatra	
March 13	"Baila Conmigo"	Selena Gomez with Rauw Alejandro	
March 20	"Un Amor Eterno"	Marc Anthony	
March 27	"Baila Conmigo"	Selena Gomez with Rauw Alejandro	
April 3	"Location"	Karol G, Anuel AA and J Balvin	
April 10	"Location"	Karol G, Anuel AA and J Balvin	
April 17	"Antes Que Salga El Sol"	Natti Natasha and Prince Royce	
April 24	"Location"	Karol G, Anuel AA and J Balvin	
May 1	"Location"	Karol G, Anuel AA and J Balvin	
May 8	"Vacio"	Luis Fonsi and Rauw Alejandro	
May 15	"Vacio"	Luis Fonsi and Rauw Alejandro	
May 22	"Vacio"	Luis Fonsi and Rauw Alejandro	
May 29	"Vacio"	Luis Fonsi and Rauw Alejandro	
June 5	"Vacio"	Luis Fonsi and Rauw Alejandro	
June 12	"Vacio"	Luis Fonsi and Rauw Alejandro	
June 19	"Todo de Ti"	Rauw Alejandro	
June 26	"Todo de Ti"	Rauw Alejandro	
July 3	"Telepatía"	Kali Uchis	
July 10	"Todo de Ti"	Rauw Alejandro	
July 17	"Todo de Ti"	Rauw Alejandro	
July 24	"Millones"	Camilo	
July 31	"Todo de Ti"	Rauw Alejandro	
August 7	"Todo de Ti"	Rauw Alejandro	
August 14	"Pareja del Año"	Sebastián Yatra and Myke Towers	
August 21	"Todo de Ti"	Rauw Alejandro	
August 28	"Todo de Ti"	Rauw Alejandro	
September 4	"Todo de Ti"	Rauw Alejandro	
September 11	"Todo de Ti"	Rauw Alejandro	
September 18	"Todo de Ti"	Rauw Alejandro	
September 25	"Todo de Ti"	Rauw Alejandro	
October 2	"Me Pasé"	Enrique Iglesias featuring Farruko	
October 9	"Todo de Ti"	Rauw Alejandro	
October 16	"Noches En Miami"	Natti Natasha	
October 23	"Todo de Ti"	Rauw Alejandro	
October 30	"Todo de Ti"	Rauw Alejandro	
November 6	"Sobrio"	Maluma	
November 13	"Todo de Ti"	Rauw Alejandro	
November 20	"Todo de Ti"	Rauw Alejandro	
November 27	"Bésame"	Luis Fonsi and Myke Towers	
December 4	"Todo de Ti"	Rauw Alejandro	
December 11	"Todo de Ti"	Rauw Alejandro	
December 18	"Todo de Ti"	Rauw Alejandro	
December 25	"Todo de Ti"	Rauw Alejandro	
