= List of number-one Billboard Latin Pop Airplay songs of 2020 =

The Billboard Latin Pop Airplay is a subchart of the Latin Airplay chart that ranked the most-played songs on Latin pop radio stations in the United States. With the issue dated August 15, 2020, Billboard revamped the chart to reflect overall airplay of Latin pop music on Latin radio stations. Instead of ranking songs being played on Latin-pop stations, rankings are instead determined by the amount of airplay Latin-pop songs receive on stations that play Latin music regardless of genre. Published by Billboard magazine, the data are compiled by Nielsen SoundScan based collectively on each single's weekly airplay.

== Chart history ==
| Issue date | Song | Artist | Ref |
|---|---|---|---|
| January 4 | "Hasta Que Salga El Sol" | Ozuna | |
| January 11 | "Hasta Que Salga El Sol" | Ozuna | |
| January 18 | "Hasta Que Salga El Sol" | Ozuna | |
| January 25 | "Que Tire Pa Lante" | Daddy Yankee | |
| February 1 | "Que Tire Pa Lante" | Daddy Yankee | |
| February 8 | "RITMO (Bad Boys For Life)" | The Black Eyed Peas and J Balvin | |
| February 15 | "Tusa" | Karol G & Nicki Minaj | |
| February 22 | "Tusa" | Karol G & Nicki Minaj | |
| February 29 | "Tusa" | Karol G & Nicki Minaj | |
| March 7 | "Tusa" | Karol G & Nicki Minaj | |
| March 14 | "Tusa" | Karol G & Nicki Minaj | |
| March 21 | "Tusa" | Karol G & Nicki Minaj | |
| March 28 | "Tusa" | Karol G & Nicki Minaj | |
| April 4 | "Tusa" | Karol G & Nicki Minaj | |
| April 11 | "Tusa" | Karol G & Nicki Minaj | |
| April 18 | "Tusa" | Karol G & Nicki Minaj | |
| April 25 | "Tusa" | Karol G & Nicki Minaj | |
| May 2 | "Tusa" | Karol G & Nicki Minaj | |
| May 9 | "Tusa" | Karol G & Nicki Minaj | |
| May 16 | "Tusa" | Karol G & Nicki Minaj | |
| May 23 | "Tusa" | Karol G & Nicki Minaj | |
| May 30 | "Morado" | J Balvin | |
| June 6 | "TBT" | Sebastián Yatra, Rauw Alejandro & Manuel Turizo | |
| June 13 | "Si Me Dices Que Si" | Reik, Farruko & Camilo | |
| June 20 | "Si Me Dices Que Si" | Reik, Farruko & Camilo | |
| June 27 | "TBT" | Sebastián Yatra, Rauw Alejandro & Manuel Turizo | |
| July 4 | "TBT" | Sebastián Yatra, Rauw Alejandro & Manuel Turizo | |
| July 11 | "ADMV" | Maluma | |
| July 18 | "Rojo" | J Balvin | |
| July 25 | "ADMV" | Maluma | |
| August 1 | "ADMV" | Maluma | |
| August 8 | "Futbol & Rumba" | Anuel AA featuring Enrique Iglesias | |
| August 15 | "Futbol & Rumba" | Anuel AA featuring Enrique Iglesias | |
| August 22 | "ADMV" | Maluma | |
| August 29 | "ADMV" | Maluma | |
| September 5 | "Agua" | Tainy and J Balvin | |
| September 12 | "Agua" | Tainy and J Balvin | |
| September 19 | "Agua" | Tainy and J Balvin | |
| September 26 | "Agua" | Tainy and J Balvin | |
| October 3 | "Agua" | Tainy and J Balvin | |
| October 10 | "Ay, Dios Mio!" | Karol G | |
| October 17 | "Un Día (One Day)" | J Balvin, Dua Lipa, Bad Bunny and Tainy | |
| October 24 | "Un Día (One Day)" | J Balvin, Dua Lipa, Bad Bunny and Tainy | |
| October 31 | "Un Día (One Day)" | J Balvin, Dua Lipa, Bad Bunny and Tainy | |
| November 7 | "Un Día (One Day)" | J Balvin, Dua Lipa, Bad Bunny and Tainy | |
| November 14 | "Un Día (One Day)" | J Balvin, Dua Lipa, Bad Bunny and Tainy | |
| November 21 | "Un Día (One Day)" | J Balvin, Dua Lipa, Bad Bunny and Tainy | |
| November 28 | "Te Quiero Baby" | Chesca, Pitbull & Frankie Valli | |
| December 5 | "Pa' Ti" | Jennifer Lopez and Maluma | |
| December 12 | "Te Quiero Baby" | Chesca, Pitbull & Frankie Valli | |
| December 19 | "Pa' Ti" | Jennifer Lopez and Maluma | |
| December 26 | "Perfecta" | Luis Fonsi and Farruko | |
