= Ece Seçkin =

Turkish singer (born 1991)

- Born: 12 September 1991 (age 34); Istanbul, Turkey
- Occupation: Singer
- Spouse: Çağrı Terlemez (m. 2021)
- Musical career
- Genres: Pop
- Instruments: Piano
- Years active: 2012–present
- Label: DMC
- Website: http://www.eceseckin.com/ (inactive)

Ece Seçkin (born 12 September 1991) is a Turkish singer. She is well known in Turkey for hit songs such as "Aman Aman", "Olsun", "Adeyyo", and "Hoş Geldin Ayrılığa". Several of her songs have over a hundred million views.

== Biography ==
=== Early years ===
Seçkin was born on 12 September 1991, in Istanbul, where she also grew up. At the age of eight, she began learning to play the piano, receiving lessons from her mother. In 1998, she placed first in the entrance exam for the piano conservatory. Besides her piano education, Seçkin also learned ballet and took dance lessons with Filiz Çoskuner in Istanbul. During her school years, Seçkin’s musical talents were discovered. She joined the school choir and later formed a small band. While still in school, Seçkin participated in various smaller competitions. In 2006, she began taking private singing lessons with Levent Arslan.

After graduating from high school in 2010, Seçkin started her studies at Bahçeşehir University School of Law, which she completed in 2014. Seçkin stated that her goal was to be equally successful in both music and academia. Her encounter with the Turkish music producer Ozan Doğulu in 2011 marked the beginning of her music career.

=== Musical career ===
In 2012, Seçkin released her debut album Bu Ne Yaa, produced in collaboration with Ozan Doğulu, under the label "Doğulu Production" in September. In 2013, she received the Altın Kelebek award in the category of "Best Newcomer." Additionally, Seçkin was nominated for the Turkish Music Award and the Pal FM Music Award in the category of "Best Female Artist."

After a break of approximately one and a half years, she released the duet single "Hoşuna Mı Gidiyor" in collaboration with Doğulu once again. "Hoşuna Mı Gidiyor" was released as a promotional single and was also included in Doğulu's third studio album, 130 Bpm Moderato. On 14 October of the same year, Seçkin released the single "Şok Oldum". The lyrics and music were written and produced by Deniz Erten, and the music video was directed by Murad Küçük.

In May 2015, Seçkin released the EP Aman Aman. The title track immediately entered the top ten of the Turkish charts upon release and also became a major international success. Aman Aman received high view counts on platforms such as YouTube, Spotify, and Deezer, which significantly increased her popularity.

On 4 July 2016, Seçkin released her third EP Zamanım Yok. This EP, named after the title track, includes the duet single "Hoş Geldin Ayrılığa", which was produced in collaboration with the group Kolpa, as well as the song "Adeyyo", which also achieved success and was featured in the Turkish charts.

== Discography ==
=== Studio albums ===
- 2024: Spektrum

=== EPs ===
- 2012: Bu Ne Yaa
- 2015: Aman Aman
- 2016: Zamanım Yok

=== Singles ===
As lead artist

- 2014: "Şok Oldum"
- 2016: "Hoş Geldin Ayrılığa" (with Kolpa)
- 2016: "Wet" (with Ozan Doğulu and Baby Brown)
- 2018: "Dibine Dibine"
- 2019: "Nos Fuimos Lejos" (with Descemer Bueno and Enrique Iglesias featuring El Micha)
- 2019: "Geçmiş Zaman"
- 2019: "Benjamins 3" (with Rozz Kalliope)
- 2020: "Acayip İyi"
- 2021: "Yastık"
- 2021: "Bon Voyage" (with Faruk Sabancı)
- 2021: "Zafer İçin Doğanlar"
- 2022: "Sen Hala Ordasın"
- 2022: "Güzelim"
- 2022: "Karma" (with Anıl Piyancı and Genco Ecer)
- 2023: "Masum"
- 2024: "Atlantis"

As featured artist

- 2014: "Hoşuna mı Gidiyor" (with Ozan Doğulu) (from the album 130 Bpm Moderato)
- 2017: "O La La" (with Sinan Ceceli) (from the album Söyle)
- 2017: "Sayın Seyirciler" (with Ozan Doğulu) (from the album 130 Bpm Forte)
- 2018: "Vazgeçtim" (from the album Yıldız Tilbe'nin Yıldızlı Şarkıları)
- 2020: "Anlayamazsın" (with Sinan Akçıl) (from the album Piyanist)
- 2022: "Ağladın Ya" (with Sinan Akçıl) (from the album Piyanist 2)
- 2022: "Yeşil Su" (from the album Serdar Ortaç Şarkıları, Vol. 1)

=== Music videos ===
- 2012: "Bu Ne Yaa"
- 2012: "Mahşer"
- 2014: "Şok Oldum"
- 2014: "Hoşuna mı Gidiyor"
- 2015: "Aman Aman"
- 2015: "Follow Me"
- 2016: "Hoş Geldin Ayrılığa"
- 2016: "Adeyyo"
- 2017: "Olsun"
- 2017: "O La La"
- 2017: "Sayın Seyirciler"
- 2018: "Dibine Dibine"
- 2019: "Vazgeçtim"
- 2019: "Nos Fuimos Lejos" (Turkish Version)
- 2019: "Geçmiş Zaman"
- 2019: "Benjamins 3"
- 2020: "Anlayamazsın"
- 2020: "Acayip İyi"
- 2021: "Yastık"
- 2021: "Zafer İçin Doğanlar"
- 2022: "Sen Hala Ordasın"
- 2022: "Güzelim"
- 2022: "Karma"
- 2023: "Masum"
- 2024: "Lambalar"
- 2024: "Atmıyor Nabzım"
- 2024: "Atlantis"
- 2024: "Kör"
- 2025: "Kör Bıçak"
