= Lalala (song) =

2019 single by bbno$

Single by Y2K and bbno$
- Released: June 7, 2019
- Recorded: 2019
- Genre: Hip hop
- Length: 2:40
- Label: Columbia
- Songwriters: Ari Starace; Alexander Gumuchian
- Producer: Y2K

Y2K singles chronology
"Lalala" (2019)	"Fast (Remix)" (2019)

bbno$ singles chronology
"Cheesy" (2019)	"Lalala" (2019)	"Bad Boy" (2019)

Enrique Iglesias singles chronology
"Después Que Te Perdí" (2019)	"Lalala (remix)" (2019)	"Me Pasé" (2021)

Carly Rae Jepsen singles chronology
"OMG" (2019)	"Lalala (remix)" (2019)	"Let's Be Friends" (2020)

Music video
- "Lalala" on YouTube

"Lalala" is a song by American producer Y2K and Canadian rapper bbno$, released as a single on June 7, 2019, by Columbia Records. The music video was released on August 21, 2019.

The song became viral on the media sharing platform TikTok due to its catchline: "Did I really just forget that melody?"

== Background ==
To promote the release of the song, Y2K and bbno$ created fake stories about how they met and made the song, sending them to blogs including Lyrical Lemonade. A remix version featuring Spanish singer Enrique Iglesias and Canadian singer Carly Rae Jepsen was released on October 30, 2019.

== Music video ==
The official video of the song was released on August 20, 2019, on Y2K's YouTube channel. The video takes place in a studio set designed to look like a children's educational show. As the video progresses, both artists begin using the different objects from the kids' show to illustrate the song, like a puppet theatre, different wallpaper and studio spaces, and a globe to point at locations.

== Reception ==
Carl Lamarre of Billboard called the track a "fun-filled tune" with bbno$'s "outlandish" rapping over the "Latin-tinged record".

It is the first song to chart for either of the duo, debuting at number 84 on the US Billboard Hot 100 before peaking at number 55. On March 17, 2023, the song was certified triple platinum by the Recording Industry Association of America for equivalent sales of 3,000,000 units in the United States.

=== Weekly charts ===
Chart (2019–2020)	Peak position
Argentina (Argentina Hot 100)	98
Australia (ARIA)	16
Austria (Ö3 Austria Top 40)	38
Belgium (Ultratop 50 Flanders)	14
Belgium (Ultratop 50 Wallonia)	10
Canada (Canadian Hot 100)	10
Czech Republic Singles Digital (ČNS IFPI)	5
Denmark (Tracklisten)	26
Finland (Suomen virallinen lista)	16
France (SNEP)	12
Germany (GfK)	46
Hungary (Single Top 40)	29
Hungary (Stream Top 40)	7
Ireland (IRMA)	36
Israel (Media Forest)	2
Italy (FIMI)	17
Latvia (LAIPA)	4
Lithuania (AGATA)	7
Lebanon (Lebanese Top 20)	8
Netherlands (Single Top 100)	36
New Zealand (Recorded Music NZ)	16
Norway (VG-lista)	23
Portugal (AFP)	7
Romania (Airplay 100)	25
San Marino (SMRRTV Top 50)	26
Scottish Singles Sales (Official Charts)	90
Slovakia Singles Digital (ČNS IFPI)	2
Spain (Promusicae)	42
Sweden (Sverigetopplistan)	55
Switzerland (Schweizer Hitparade)	26
UK Singles (Official Charts)	32
UK Hip Hop/R&B (Official Charts)	23
US Billboard Hot 100	55
US Hot R&B/Hip-Hop Songs (Billboard)	22
US Rolling Stone Top 100	39

=== Year-end charts ===
Chart (2019)	Position
Australia (ARIA)	89
Belgium (Ultratop Flanders)	23
Belgium (Ultratop Wallonia)	75
Canada (Canadian Hot 100)	44
France (SNEP)	109
Italy (FIMI)	94
Latvia (LAIPA)	23
Portugal (AFP)	72
Switzerland (Schweizer Hitparade)	85
US Hot R&B/Hip-Hop Songs (Billboard)	62

Chart (2020)	Position
Canada (Canadian Hot 100)	63
Romania (Airplay 100)	98

=== Certifications ===
Region	Certification	Certified units/sales
Australia (ARIA)	2× Platinum	140,000^{‡}
Belgium (BRMA)	Gold	20,000^{‡}
Canada (Music Canada)	5× Platinum	400,000^{‡}
Denmark (IFPI Danmark)	Gold	45,000^{‡}
France (SNEP)	Diamond	333,333^{‡}
Germany (BVMI)	Gold	200,000^{‡}
Italy (FIMI)	Platinum	50,000^{‡}
Mexico (AMPROFON)	3× Platinum	180,000^{‡}
New Zealand (RMNZ)	2× Platinum	60,000^{‡}
Poland (ZPAV)	2× Platinum	40,000^{‡}
Portugal (AFP)	Platinum	10,000^{‡}
Spain (Promusicae)	Platinum	60,000^{‡}
Switzerland (IFPI Switzerland)	Platinum	20,000^{‡}
United Kingdom (BPI)	Gold	400,000^{‡}
United States (RIAA)	3× Platinum	3,000,000^{‡}
^{‡} Sales+streaming figures based on certification alone.
