= Nos Fuimos Lejos =

- Cover for the original version

Single by Descemer Bueno and Enrique Iglesias featuring El Micha
- Released: 6 April 2018
- Length: 3:29
- Label: Sony
- Songwriters: Bueno; Iglesias; El Micha; Jorge Luis Piloto

Descemer Bueno singles chronology
"Preciosa" (2017)	"Nos Fuimos Lejos" (2018)	"Mátame" (2019)

Enrique Iglesias singles chronology
"El Baño" (2018)	"Nos Fuimos Lejos" (2018)	"Move to Miami" (2018)

Music video
- "Nos Fuimos Lejos" on YouTube

"Nos Fuimos Lejos" (Spanish: "We Went Away") is a song by Cuban singer Descemer Bueno and Spanish recording artist Enrique Iglesias, featuring collaborative vocals by El Micha. Written by Bueno, Iglesias, El Micha and Jorge Luis Piloto, it was digitally released on 6 April 2018 by Sony Music Entertainment. Several other versions of the singles were eventually released, including other artists—Andra, David Calzado y Su Charanga Habanera, Hatim Ammor and RedOne, Bebe, and Ece Seçkin. The original version of "Nos Fuimos Lejos" charted on several other Latin Billboard charts, while the "Romanian Version" with Andra reached the top 10 in Romania.

== Release ==
"Nos Fuimos Lejos" was digitally released on 6 April 2018, as credited to Descemer Bueno and Enrique Iglesias featuring El Micha. Eventually, a "Romanian Version" of the single was premiered on 25 August 2018, listing Romanian singer Andra as a lead artist. On 4 September, El Micha was replaced as a featured artist by group David Calzado y Su Charanga Habanera for the release of a "Tropical Version". An "Arabic Version" was made available on 14 September, having Arabic singer Hatim Ammor as a lead artist and RedOne as a featured artist alongside El Micha. An "Acoustic Version" of the single was published on 19 April 2019, listing Bebe as a lead artist. Finally, a "Turkish Version" of the song was released on 7 June 2019, which had Turkish singer Ece Seçkin as a featured artist. All aforementioned releases were conducted by Sony Music Entertainment.

== Music videos ==
An accompanying music video for "Nos Fuimos Lejos" was uploaded onto Iglesias's YouTube channel on 6 April 2018. Visuals were also released to all other versions of the song, featuring shots of the additional artists alongside the original video footage.

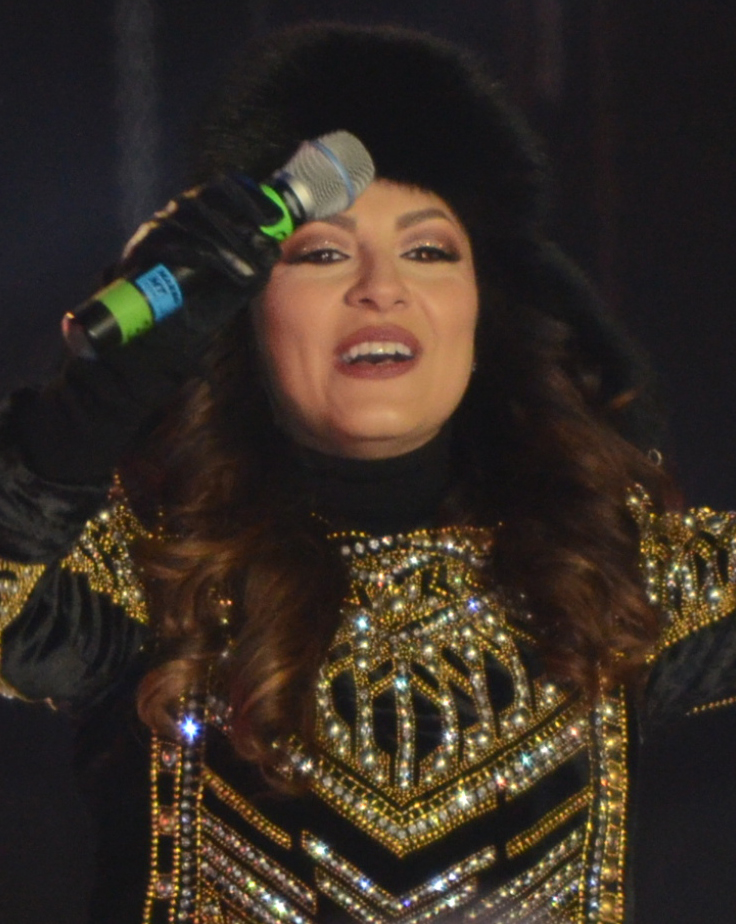
The "Romanian Version" of the single featured Romanian singer Andra, and reached the top 10 in Romanian charts.

== Track listing ==
- Digital download
1. "Nos Fuimos Lejos" [featuring El Micha] – 3:29
2. "Nos Fuimos Lejos" (Romanian Version) [featuring El Micha] – 3:56
3. "Nos Fuimos Lejos" (Tropical Version) [featuring David Calzado y Su Charanga Habanera] – 4:48
4. "Nos Fuimos Lejos" (Arabic Version) [with Hatim Ammor featuring El Micha and RedOne] – 3:26
5. "Nos Fuimos Lejos" (Acoustic Version) [featuring Bebe] – 3:53
6. "Nos Fuimos Lejos" (Turkish Version) [featuring Ece Seçkin and El Micha] – 3:49

== Charts ==
=== Weekly charts ===
Chart (2018―2021)	Peak position
Dominican Republic Pop (Monitor Latino)	19
Honduras Pop (Monitor Latino)	5
Hungary (Single Top 40)	13
Romania (Airplay 100) Romanian Version	8
Romania Airplay (Media Forest)	1
Romania TV Airplay (Media Forest)	6
US Latin Airplay (Billboard)	35
US Latin Rhythm Airplay (Billboard)	21
Venezuela Pop (Monitor Latino)	10

=== Year-end charts ===
Chart (2018)	Position
Romania (Airplay 100) Romanian Version	84

== Certifications ==
Region	Certification	Certified units/sales
United States (RIAA)	Platinum (Latin)	60,000^{‡}
^{‡} Sales+streaming figures based on certification alone.

== Release history ==
Territory	Date	Label
Various	6 April 2018	Sony
Various Romanian Version	25 August 2018	Sony
Various Tropical Version	4 September 2018	Sony
Various Arabic Version	14 September 2018	Sony
Various Acoustic Version	19 April 2019	Sony
Various Turkish Version	7 June 2019	Sony
