= Pendejo (song) =

2021 single by Enrique Iglesias

Single by Enrique Iglesias

from the album Final (Vol. 1)
- Released: 17 September 2021
- Genre: Latin pop
- Length: 2:45
- Label: RCA; Sony Music Latin
- Songwriters: Enrique Iglesias; Vladimir Rameriz; Rafel Rodriguez; Silverio Lozada; Luis Adolfo Medina
- Producers: Carlos Paucar and HoneyBoos

Enrique Iglesias singles chronology
"Me Pasé" (2021)	"Pendejo" (2021)	"Te Fuiste" (2021)

Music video
- "Pendejo" on YouTube

"Pendejo" (transl. Fool) is a song by Spanish singer Enrique Iglesias. It was released by Sony Music Latin and RCA Records on 17 September 2021 as a single from Iglesias' eleventh studio album Final (Vol. 1). This was the first single released by Iglesias without an additional artist on the track since 2013's "Heart Attack".

== Music video ==
The video was released on 17 September 2021, simultaneous with the release of the album Final. It was directed by Jessy Terrero, who had previously directed the videos for Iglesias' singles "Do You Know? / Dímelo", "Cuando Me Enamoro", "El Perdedor", and "Forgiveness".

== Charts ==
Weekly chart performance for "Pendejo"
Chart (2021)	Peak position
Argentina Hot 100 (Billboard)	42
Argentina Airplay (Monitor Latino)	5
Costa Rica (Monitor Latino)	7
Guatemala (Monitor Latino)	4
Mexico Airplay (Billboard)	18
Panama Pop (Monitor Latino)	6
Puerto Rico Pop (Monitor Latino)	8
US Hot Latin Songs (Billboard)	33
US Latin Airplay (Billboard)	45
US Latin Pop Airplay (Billboard)	13
