= Después Que Te Perdí =

Single by Jon Z and Enrique Iglesias
- Released: March 13, 2019
- Length: 4:07
- Label: Sony
- Songwriters: Enrique Iglesias; Jon Z; Duran The Coach; Martin Rodriguez Vicente; Roberto Arturo Tejada Perez; Jhonny Sanchez Olivera

Jon Z singles chronology
"Falso Amor" (2018)	"Después Que Te Perdí" (2019)	"Go Loko" (2019)

Enrique Iglesias singles chronology
"I Don't Dance (Without You)" (2018)	"Después Que Te Perdí" (2019)	"Fútbol y Rumba" (2020)

"Después Que Te Perdí" (transl. "After I Lost You") is a song by Puerto Rican rapper Jon Z and Spanish singer Enrique Iglesias. The song was released on March 13, 2019.

== Background ==
This is another version of Jon Z's original version. Jon Z's original version was released on 15 February 2019.

== Music video ==
The music video for the song was released on March 13, 2019.

== Charts ==
=== Weekly charts ===
Weekly chart performance for "Después Que Te Perdí"
Chart (2019)	Peak position
Argentina (Argentina Hot 100)	99
Dominican Republic (Monitor Latino)	13
Mexico Airplay (Billboard)	28
Puerto Rico (Monitor Latino)	5
US Hot Latin Songs (Billboard)	27
US Latin Airplay (Billboard)	18
US Latin Rhythm Airplay (Billboard)	11

=== Year-end charts ===
Year-end chart performance for "Después Que Te Perdí"
Chart (2019)	Position
Dominican Republic (Monitor Latino)	84
Puerto Rico (Monitor Latino)	52

== Release history ==
Region	Date	Format	Label
United States	March 13, 2019	Digital download; streaming	Sony
