= Final (Vol. 1) =

Studio album by Enrique Iglesias
- Released: 17 September 2021
- Recorded: 2016–2017, 2021
- Genres: Reggaeton; pop
- Length: 34:00
- Languages: Spanish; English
- Labels: RCA; Sony Music Latin
- Producers: Space Primates; Ovy on the Drums; Carlos Paucar; HoneyBoos; Chris Jedi; Gaby Music; Luny Tunes; J.R. Rotem; Nitti Gritti; Wuki; Saga Whiteblack

Enrique Iglesias chronology
Greatest Hits (2019)	Final (Vol. 1) (2021)	Final (Vol. 2) (2024)

Singles from Final
- 1. "El Perdón" Released: February 6, 2015; 2. "Duele el Corazón" Released: 18 April 2016; 3. "Súbeme la Radio" Released: 24 February 2017; 4. "El Baño" Released: 12 January 2018; 5. "Move to Miami" Released: 3 May 2018; 6. "Me Pasé" Released: 1 July 2021; 7. "Pendejo" Released: 17 September 2021; 8. "Te Fuiste" Released: 17 September 2021; 9. "Chasing the Sun" Released: 5 November 2021

Final (Vol. 1) is the eleventh studio album recorded by Spanish singer Enrique Iglesias. Volume 1 was released on 17 September 2021 by RCA Records through Sony Music Latin. It is his first album in seven years since he released Sex and Love. The album features collaborations with several artists and is going to occur in Volume 1 and Volume 2. During a live chat with Ricky Martin and Sebastián Yatra on Instagram on 3 September 2021, Iglesias suggested that Final would be the last album in his career he would release.

== Background ==
Starting in 2016, the album was preceded by a number of singles that were intended to be included on the upcoming album. These singles included "Duele El Corazon", "Subeme La Radio", "El Baño" and "Move to Miami". The album was originally scheduled to come out in 2017, but was pushed back due to Iglesias' touring commitments, so instead more singles were released. The COVID-19 pandemic gave Iglesias the opportunity to go into the studio and start work on both volumes of the album. In an interview with Rolling Stone he explained, "I wanted to release this album in 2017, and I just keep putting out singles. I was touring a lot and I didn't have time to go to the studio. And the last year, I've had a lot of time to go to the studio and just work there by myself and to work with Carlos [Paucar] a lot and just go back and forth and finish up what I've needed to finish up for the last three years."

In addition to previously released singles which were collaborations with Wisin, Descemer Bueno, Zion & Lennox, Bad Bunny and Pitbull, the album includes his 2015 duet with Nicky Jam, "El Perdon". The album also includes three new Spanish tracks, such as "Me Pasé" featuring Puerto Rican rapper Farruko and "Te Fuiste" featuring Myke Towers, as well as three new English-language tracks.

During a video chat with Ricky Martin and Sebastian Yatra to promote their joint tour, Iglesias revealed that the album would be a two-part release entitled Final, as these would be the last albums of his career. Iglesias claimed, "it's something that I have been thinking about for the past few years" but also insisted, "I'm never going to stop writing songs because I love writing songs, but I'm going to do it in a different way, meaning they don't necessarily have to be packaged as an album, so this project to me is important".

Final Vol. 1 was Iglesias' first studio album not to have an accompanying physical release upon its debut, though CD copies were released shortly thereafter.

== Commercial performance ==
The album debuted at number 12 on Billboard's Top Latin Albums and number two on the Latin Pop Albums chart. This became Iglesias' first studio album to miss the Billboard 200, selling 4,000 album equivalent units in its first week. However, it reached number 45 in Iglesias' home country of Spain, number 41 in Portugal, and number 56 in Switzerland.

== Critical reception ==
Professional ratings
Review scores
Source	Rating
Entertainment Focus	3.5/5 stars
The Independent	2/5 stars

Roisin O'Connor from The Independent gave the album two out of five stars. She stated that Iglesias was "worn out" and described the album as "surprisingly unsexy", which positioned him "more as court jester than the Latin king he once was". She called "Chasing the Sun" a "bland auto-tune fest" and although she thought "things pick up a tiny bit" on "Me Pasé" and "Súbeme la Radio", she described "El Baño" as "ludicrous", criticising its lyrics about how Iglesias's lover "can 'make [him] so hard'" that he wants to go to the bathroom to have sex.

== Track listing ==
Final: Volume 1 track listing
No.	Title	Writer(s)	Producer(s)	Length
1.	"Chasing the Sun"	Enrique Iglesias; Nathan Cunningham; Marty James; Marc Sibley; Jordan Rand Miller; Carlos Paucar	Space Primates	2:31
2.	"Te Fuiste" (featuring Myke Towers)	Iglesias; Myke Towers; Ovy on the Drums	Ovy on the Drums	3:02
3.	"Pendejo"	Iglesias; Vladimir Ramirez; Rafael Rodriguez; Luis Adolfo Medina	Carlos Paucar; HoneyBoos	2:45
4.	"Unwell"	Iglesias; Cunningham; James; Sibley; Rand Miller	Space Primates	3:00
5.	"All About You"	Iglesias; Cunningham; James; Sibley; Rand Miller; Paucar	Space Primates	3:06
6.	"Me Pasé" (featuring Farruko)	Iglesias; Farruko; Ender Thomas; Silverio Lozada; Descemer Bueno; Franklin Martinez	Paucar	3:01
7.	"Súbeme la Radio" (featuring Descemer Bueno and Zion & Lennox)	Iglesias; Descemer Bueno; Chris Jedi; Zion & Lennox; Juan Rivera; Luis Ortiz	Chris Jedi; Paucar; Gaby Music	3:27
8.	"Duele el Corazón" (featuring Wisin)	Iglesias; Patrick Ingunza; Lozada; Wisin; Servando Primera; Hasibur Rahman; Francisco Saldaña	Paucar; Francisco "Luny" Saldaña (co.)	3:19
9.	"El Baño" (featuring Bad Bunny)	Iglesias; Bad Bunny; Saldaña; Xavier Semper; Edgar Semper; Rahman; Primera; Luian Malavé	Paucar; Luny Tunes	3:34
10.	"Move to Miami" (featuring Pitbull)	Iglesias; Pitbull; Jorge Gomez; Bilal Hajji; Jimmy Thornfeldt; James; J.R. Rotem; Wuki; Primera; José Garcia; Nitti Gritti	J.R. Rotem; Nitti Gritti; Wuki	2:48
11.	"El Perdón" (with Nicky Jam)	Iglesias; James; Theron Thomas; Timothy Thomas; Saga WhiteBlack; Juan Diego Medina; Nicky Jam	Saga Whiteblack	3:27
Total length:				34:00

== Charts ==
=== Weekly charts ===
Weekly chart performance for Final (Vol. 1)
Chart (2021)	Peak position
Portuguese Albums (AFP)	41
Spanish Albums (Promusicae)	45
Swiss Albums (Schweizer Hitparade)	56
UK Album Downloads (Official Charts)	32
US Latin Pop Albums (Billboard)	2
US Top Latin Albums (Billboard)	12

=== Year-end charts ===
Yearly chart performance for Final (Vol. 1)
Chart (2021)	Position
US Latin Pop Albums (Billboard)	20
US Top Latin Albums (Billboard)	75

== Certifications ==
Certifications for Final (Vol. 1)
Region	Certification	Certified units/sales
Canada (Music Canada)	Gold	40,000^{‡}
France (SNEP)	Gold	50,000^{‡}
Mexico (AMPROFON)	Platinum	140,000^{‡}
Poland (ZPAV)	Platinum	20,000^{‡}
United States (RIAA)	6× Platinum (Latin)	360,000^{‡}
^{‡} Sales+streaming figures based on certification alone.
