= Te Fuiste (Enrique Iglesias song) =

2021 single by Enrique Iglesias

Single by Enrique Iglesias featuring Myke Towers

from the album Final (Vol. 1)
- Released: 17 September 2021
- Length: 3:02
- Label: RCA; Sony Latin
- Songwriters: Enrique Iglesias; Daniel Echavarria Oviedo; Michael A. Torres Monge
- Producer: Ovy on the Drums

Enrique Iglesias singles chronology
"Pendejo" (2021)	"Te Fuiste" (2021)	"Espacio en Tu Corazón" (2022)

Music video
- "Te Fuiste" on YouTube

"Te Fuiste" (transl. You left) is a song by Spanish singer Enrique Iglesias featuring Puerto Rican rapper Myke Towers. It was released as single from Iglesias' eleventh studio album Final (Vol. 1).

== Music video ==
The video was released on 3 February 2022 and was directed by Marlon Peña.

== Charts ==
Weekly chart performance for "Te Fuiste"
Chart (2022)	Peak position
Dominican Republic Pop (Monitor Latino)	9
Guatemala (Monitor Latino)	13
Mexico Airplay (Billboard)	7
Puerto Rico (Monitor Latino)	12
US Latin Airplay (Billboard)	29
US Latin Pop Airplay (Billboard)	7
US Latin Rhythm Airplay (Billboard)	13

=== Year-end charts ===
Year-end chart performance for "Te Fuiste"
Chart (2022)	Position
Puerto Rico (Monitor Latino)	61
US Latin Pop Songs (Billboard)	21
US Latin Rhythm Airplay (Billboard)	44
