= Hatim Ammor =

Moroccan musical artist

- حاتم عمور
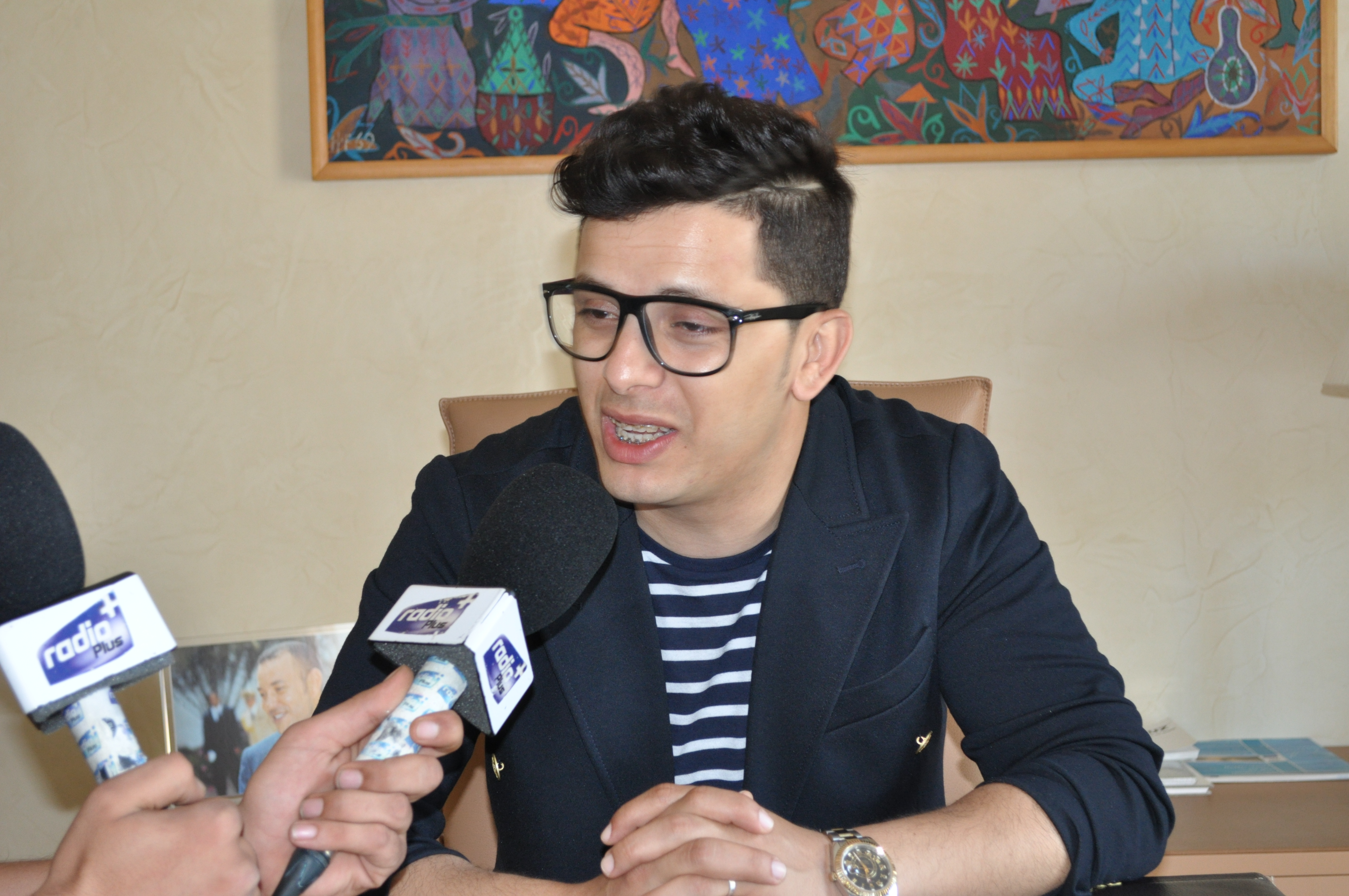
- Born: August 29, 1981 (age 43); Hay Mohammadi, Casablanca, Morocco
- Occupations: singer; actor
- Years active: 2005–present
- Musical career
- Genres: Arabic music; Moroccan pop

Hatim Ammor (born August 29, 1981) is a Moroccan singer. He performed at the Expo 2020. Ammor was born in 1981 in Hay Mohammadi. His wife, Hind Tazi, was diagnosed with cancer on 2019. Ammor is a brand ambassador of Oppo.
