= I Don't Dance (Without You) =

Single by Matoma with Enrique Iglesias featuring Konshens

from the album One in a Million
- Released: 27 July 2018
- Length: 2:57
- Label: Warner Music Group
- Songwriter(s): Enrique Iglesias; Thomas Stræte Lagergren; Simon Wilcox; Garfield Palmer
- Producer(s): Matoma

Matoma singles chronology
"Lonely" (2018)	"I Don't Dance (Without You)" (2018)	"Sunday Morning" (2018)

Enrique Iglesias singles chronology
"Move to Miami" (2018)	"I Don't Dance (Without You)" (2018)	"Después Que Te Perdí" (2019)

Konshens singles chronology
"Oh God" (2018)	"I Don't Dance (Without You)" (2018)

"I Don't Dance (Without You)" is a 2018 song by Norwegian DJ Matoma, as a collaboration with Spanish singer Enrique Iglesias, featuring Jamaican dancehall recording artist Konshens, released as the third single for Matoma's second studio album, One in a Million. The song was released on 27 July 2018.

== Background ==
On 20 July 2018, Iglesias posted on his official Facebook account a 15-second snippet of an upcoming song, announcing the collaboration with him and Matoma, and also the release date of the single.

Matoma has previously remixed Enrique's song Bailando. Matoma also expressed his feelings on social media while recording this song with Enrique: "When I [Matoma] signed my publishing deal they asked me some of my dream collaborations I answered, "If you can get me in the studio with Enrique for an original collaboration together I would have achieved one of my bucket list goals", and "He [Enrique] is unbelievably humble and a truly good man. Now after our months working together on this release I not only have the honor of collaborating with one of the most influenced Latin artists of our time, but also gained a friend. I am forever grateful for that".

== Lyric video ==
A lyric video for the song was released on 27 July 2018. The video has been viewed over 20 million times as of January 2019.

== Charts ==
=== Weekly charts ===
Chart (2018–19)	Peak position
Belgium (Ultratip Bubbling Under Flanders)	38
CIS Airplay (TopHit)	167
Hungary (Rádiós Top 40)	2
Poland (Polish Airplay Top 100)	11
Poland (Dance Top 50)	15
Slovakia (Rádio Top 100)	54
US Hot Dance/Electronic Songs (Billboard)	22

=== Year-end charts ===
Chart (2019)	Position
Hungary (Rádiós Top 40)	16

== Release history ==
Region	Date	Format	Label
United States	27 July 2018	Digital download	Warner Music Group
