= Move to Miami =

Single by Enrique Iglesias featuring Pitbull

from the album Final (Vol. 1)
- Released: 3 May 2018
- Genre: Latin pop
- Length: 2:49
- Label: RCA; Sony Latin
- Songwriters: Enrique Iglesias; Armando Pérez; Jorge Gomez; Bilal Hajji; Jimmy Thornfeldt; Marty James; J.R. Rotem; Kris Barman; Servando Primera; José Garcia; Richard Cook Mears
- Producers: J.R. Rotem; Nitti Gritti; Wuki

Enrique Iglesias singles chronology
| "Nos Fuimos Lejos" (2018) | "Move to Miami" (2018) | "I Don't Dance (Without You)" (2018) |

Pitbull singles chronology
| "Carnaval" (2018) | "Move to Miami" (2018) | "Goalie Goalie" (2018) |

Music video
- "Move to Miami" on YouTube

"Move to Miami" is a song by Spanish singer Enrique Iglesias featuring American rapper Pitbull. It was released by RCA Records and Sony Music Latin on 3 May 2018. The track was written by Iglesias, Pitbull, Jorge Gomez, Bilal Hajji, Jimmy Joker, Marty James, Servando Primera, José Garcia, and its producers J.R. Rotem, Nitti Gritti and Wuki. The song was Iglesias' first full English single since "I'm a Freak" (2014).

== Background ==
The song follows "El Baño", released in January 2018. This is the twelfth collaboration between Iglesias and Pitbull, and their first since "Messin' Around" (2016). Iglesias and Pitbull also toured together on the Enrique Iglesias and Pitbull Live tour in 2017. The song was teased via Pitbull's Instagram on 24 April 2018.

== Music video ==
A lyric video for the song was uploaded on Iglesias' YouTube channel on 3 May 2018, and the official music video featuring both Iglesias and Pitbull was released on 9 May 2018. The video has since garnered over 76 million views as of July 2026. The music video was directed by Fernando Lugo and was shot directly in Miami. The concept for the music video was conceived by Iglesias' longtime creative director and collaborator Yasha Malekzad. The video was produced by Artist Preserve.

== In pop culture ==
"Move to Miami" is included in the soundtrack for the film, Impractical Jokers: The Movie.

== Track listing ==
Digital download
| No. | Title | Length |
|---|---|---|
| 1. | "Move to Miami" (featuring Pitbull) | 2:49 |

== Personnel ==
- J.R. Rotem – production
- Nitti Gritti – production
- Wuki – production
- Jorge Gomez – miscellaneous production
- Jimmy Joker – miscellaneous production
- IAmChino – miscellaneous production
- Bilal Hajji – miscellaneous production
- Marty James – background vocals
- Carlos Paucar – vocal production and mix engineering
- Al Burna – record engineering
- David Hopkins – engineering assistance
- Randy Merrill – master engineering

Credits adapted from Qobuz.

== Charts ==
=== Weekly charts ===
| Chart (2018) | Peak position |
|---|---|
| Argentina Anglo (Monitor Latino) | 5 |
| Belgium (Ultratip Bubbling Under Flanders) | 36 |
| Belgium (Ultratip Bubbling Under Wallonia) | 1 |
| Canada CHR/Top 40 (Billboard) | 40 |
| CIS Airplay (TopHit) | 186 |
| Guatemala Anglo (Monitor Latino) | 1 |
| Greece Digital Singles (IFPI Greece) | 83 |
| Honduras Pop (Monitor Latino) | 13 |
| Hungary (Single Top 40) | 12 |
| Mexico Airplay (Billboard) | 10 |
| Mexico Ingles Airplay (Billboard) | 11 |
| Poland Dance (ZPAV) | 13 |
| Romania (Radiomonitor) | 15 |
| Romania TV Airplay (Media Forest) | 6 |
| Spain (PROMUSICAE) | 91 |
| Switzerland (Schweizer Hitparade) | 81 |
| US Dance Club Songs (Billboard) | 5 |
| US Pop Airplay (Billboard) | 27 |
| US Latin Airplay (Billboard) | 40 |

=== Year-end charts ===
| Chart (2018) | Position |
|---|---|
| Romania (Airplay 100) | 60 |

== Certifications ==
| Region | Certification | Certified units/sales |
|---|---|---|
| Canada (Music Canada) | Gold | 40,000^{‡} |
| Mexico (AMPROFON) | Gold | 30,000^{‡} |
^{‡} Sales+streaming figures based on certification alone.
