= El Perdón =

2015 single by Nicky Jam and Enrique Iglesias

"El Perdón" / "Forgiveness"

Single by Nicky Jam and Enrique Iglesias

from the album Fénix and Final (Vol. 1)
- Released: February 6, 2015
- Recorded: 2014–2015
- Genre: Latin pop; reggaeton
- Length: 3:27
- Label: Sony Latin; RCA
- Songwriters: Nick Rivera; Caminero Lil' Eddie
- Producer: Saga Whiteblack

Nicky Jam singles chronology
"Travesuras" (2014)	"El Perdón" / "Forgiveness" (2015)	"Como lo Hacía Yo" (2015)

Enrique Iglesias singles chronology
"Bailando" (2014)	"El Perdón" (2015)	"Noche y De Día" (2015)

"Forgiveness" (English edition)
- Cover of the English version of "Forgiveness", released on July 10, 2015

Music video
- "El Perdón" on YouTube

"El Perdón" (English: "Forgiveness") is a song by American singer Nicky Jam and Spanish singer Enrique Iglesias released as the first single to Nicky Jam's third studio album Fénix (2017). An English-language version of the song, titled "Forgiveness", was released on July 10, 2015. The single was later included on Enrique Iglesias' eleventh studio album Final (2021).

== Background ==
"El Perdón" was initially a solo track by Nicky Jam. After talking with Jam, Spanish singer Enrique Iglesias decided to collaborate with him to release a single. Iglesias told Billboard that even though he usually writes or co-writes the songs he sings on, he didn't provide songwriting on the track. The song quickly rose to the top of the charts and became a huge success. The music video was recorded in Medellin, Colombia.

== Reception ==
=== Critical ===
Billboard ranked "El Perdón" at number 12 on its year-end list: "So much has been said about records set by "El Perdón," the second longest-running number-one song on the Billboard Hot Latin Songs chart. But too little has been said about the mix of sweet and sad on the danceable tune. Not to mention those plaintive lyrics of lost love that can make girls (and guys) cry. "When I wrote the beginning of the song—'Did he take you to the moon, and I couldn't do that'—that part hit me really hard," Nicky Jam told Billboard. Trust us, Nicky, we get it, too."

"El Perdón" won a Latin Grammy Award, for it hit number-one in over 40 countries around the world, achieving over four million sales and 300 million streams worldwide.

=== Commercial ===
"El Perdón" became an international hit. The song reached number one on the Billboard Hot Latin Songs within five weeks, and spent 30 weeks at the top spot, bypassing Shakira's "La Tortura" (25 weeks), and behind Iglesias' own song "Bailando" (41 weeks). The song reached the summit on multiple Billboard Latin charts, including Latin Airplay, Latin Digital Sales, Latin Streaming Songs, and Latin Pop Songs. Nicky Jam and Iglesias released an English version of the track titled "Forgiveness". The release, with strong first week digital sales, brought the single to reach number 56 on the Billboard Hot 100.

The single had staying power, logging 30 weeks on the Hot 100, becoming the longest-charting song not to make the top 50. "El Perdón" ranked number 96 on the Billboard year-end top 100, becoming the lowest-peaking song to make the year-end chart (a record which would later be broken by "Talk You Out of It" by Florida Georgia Line which peaked at 57 in 2019). The English version, "Forgiveness", made an impact on Mainstream Top 40 and Rhythmic Top 40 stations in the US, peaking at number 29 in total audience for Mainstream Top 40 according to Mediabase. On September 1, 2015, the video for "Forgiveness", directed by Jessy Terrero, debuted on Jam's channel on YouTube, and has more than 45 million views. The Spanish version of the "El Perdón" music video has over 1.3 billion views, and the lyric video counts over 450 million views. The single also peaked at number one in Spain, France, Italy and Netherlands and charted in the top five in Switzerland and Belgium. In the Netherlands, Iglesias scored his first number-one hit with "El Perdón", after having previously scored four top two hits ("Could I Have This Kiss Forever", "Hero", "Do You Know" and "Can You Hear Me") in that country. The song spent six weeks at number one in France and was certified diamond in the nation and Poland for sales of 500,000 and 100,000 respectively.

== Charts ==
=== Weekly charts ===
Chart (2015–17)	Peak position
Austria (Ö3 Austria Top 40)	9
Belgium (Ultratop 50 Flanders)	2
Belgium (Ultratop 50 Wallonia)	1
Bulgaria (IFPI)	2
Canada Hot 100 (Billboard)	82
Canada CHR/Top 40 (Billboard)	47
Czech Republic Airplay (ČNS IFPI)	5
Euro Digital Songs (Billboard)	7
France (SNEP)	1
Germany (GfK)	8
Hungary (Single Top 40)	13
Hungary (Stream Top 40)	30
Ireland (IRMA)	83
Israel International Airplay (Media Forest)	6
Italy (FIMI)	1
Lebanon (Lebanese Top 20)	4
Mexico Pop (Monitor Latino)	1
Netherlands (Dutch Top 40)	1
Netherlands (Single Top 100)	1
Poland Airplay (ZPAV)	1
Portugal (Billboard)	1
Romania Airplay (Media Forest)	1
Slovakia Airplay (ČNS IFPI)	3
Slovenia (SloTop50)	18
Spain (Promusicae)	1
Sweden (Sverigetopplistan)	4
Switzerland (Schweizer Hitparade)	1
US Billboard Hot 100	56
US Pop Airplay (Billboard) English version	30
US Rhythmic Airplay (Billboard) English version	29
US Hot Latin Songs (Billboard)	1
US Latin Airplay (Billboard)	1
Venezuela (Record Report)	4

=== Year-end charts ===
Chart (2015)	Position
Austria (Ö3 Austria Top 40)	36
Belgium (Ultratop Flanders)	25
Belgium (Ultratop Wallonia)	16
France (SNEP)	11
Germany (Official German Charts)	41
Italy (FIMI)	2
Netherlands (Dutch Top 40)	12
Netherlands (Single Top 100)	11
Poland (ZPAV)	15
Spain (PROMUSICAE)	1
Sweden (Sverigetopplistan)	26
Switzerland (Schweizer Hitparade)	4
US Billboard Hot 100	96
US Latin Songs (Billboard)	1
US Latin Pop Songs (Billboard)	1
US Latin Airplay (Billboard)	1
US Tropical Songs (Billboard)	8
Chart (2016)	Position
Argentina (Monitor Latino)	91
France (SNEP)	113
Italy (FIMI)	88
Slovenia (SloTop50)	25
Spain (PROMUSICAE)	68
Switzerland (Schweizer Hitparade)	61
US Latin Songs (Billboard)	10
US Latin Pop Songs (Billboard)	29

=== Decade-end charts ===
Chart (2010–2019)	Position
US Hot Latin Songs (Billboard)	3

=== All-time charts ===
Chart (2021)	Position
US Hot Latin Songs (Billboard)	8

== Certifications ==
Region	Certification	Certified units/sales
Austria (IFPI Austria)	Platinum	30,000^{‡}
Belgium (BRMA)	Platinum	20,000^{‡}
Canada (Music Canada)	2× Platinum	160,000^{‡}
Denmark (IFPI Danmark)	Gold	45,000^{‡}
France (SNEP)	Gold	75,000^{*}
Germany (BVMI)	3× Gold	600,000^{‡}
Italy (FIMI)	8× Platinum	400,000^{‡}
Mexico (AMPROFON)	2× Diamond+Gold	630,000^{‡}
Netherlands (NVPI)	Platinum	30,000^{‡}
Poland (ZPAV)	3× Diamond	300,000^{‡}
Spain (Promusicae)	6× Platinum	240,000^{‡}
Sweden (GLF)	6× Platinum	240,000^{‡}
Switzerland (IFPI Switzerland)	3× Platinum	90,000^{‡}
United Kingdom (BPI)	Silver	200,000^{‡}
United States (RIAA)	27× Platinum (Latin)	1,620,000^{‡}
Summaries
Worldwide	—	4,000,000
^{*} Sales figures based on certification alone.^{‡} Sales+streaming figures based on certification alone.

== Awards and nominations ==
Year	Ceremony	Award	Result
2015	Premios Juventud	La Combinación Perfecta (The Perfect Combo)	Nominated
2015	Premios Juventud	La Más Pegajosa (Catchiest Tune)	Nominated
2015	Premios Tu Mundo	Party-Starting Song	Won
2015	Latin American Music Awards	Song of the Year	Won
2015	Latin American Music Awards	Favorite Collaboration	Won
2015	Latin American Music Awards	Favorite Streaming Song	Won
2015	Latin Grammy Awards	Best Urban Performance	Won
2015	NRJ Music Awards	International Group/Duo of the Year	Nominated
2016	Lo Nuestro Awards	Collaboration of the Year	Won
2016	Lo Nuestro Awards	Urban Song of the Year	Won
2016	Billboard Music Awards	Top Latin Song	Won

== See also ==
- List of number-one Billboard Hot Latin Songs of 2015
- List of number-one singles of 2015 (Spain)
