= Me Pasé =

2021 single by Enrique Iglesias and Farruko

Single by Enrique Iglesias featuring Farruko

from the album Final (Vol. 1)
- Released: 1 July 2021
- Genre: Reggaeton
- Length: 3:02
- Label: RCA; Sony Latin
- Songwriters: Enrique Iglesias; Carlos Efrén Reyes Rosado; Ender Thomas; Silverio Lozada; Descemer Bueno; Franklin Martinez
- Producer: Carlos Paucar

Enrique Iglesias singles chronology
"Fútbol y Rumba" (2020)	"Me Pasé" (2021)	"Pendejo" (2021)

Farruko singles chronology
"Pepas" (2021)	"Me Pasé" (2021)	"El Incomprendido" (2021)

Music video
- "Me Pasé" on YouTube

"Me Pasé" (transl. I passed out) is a song by Spanish singer Enrique Iglesias, featuring Puerto Rican singer-songwriter Farruko. It was released by Sony Music Latin and RCA Records on 1 July 2021, as a single from Iglesias' eleventh studio album Final (Vol. 1).

== Music video ==
The video was released 1 July 2021. It was filmed in Samana El Portillo, Dominican Republic and directed by Alejandro Pérez. Within the first 18 hours of its release, it was streamed more than a million times. As of October 2023, it has been viewed over 73 million times.

== Track listing ==
Digital download
No.	Title	Length
1.	"Me Pasé" (featuring Farruko)	3:02

== Charts ==
=== Weekly charts ===
Weekly chart performance for "Me Pasé"
Chart (2021)	Peak position
Argentina Hot 100 (Billboard)	46
Argentina Airplay (Monitor Latino)	10
Bolivia (Monitor Latino)	9
Chile (Monitor Latino)	16
Colombia (Monitor Latino)	17
Costa Rica (Monitor Latino)	20
Croatia (HRT)	30
Czech Republic Airplay (ČNS IFPI)	33
Dominican Republic Pop (Monitor Latino)	5
Ecuador (Monitor Latino)	8
El Salvador (Monitor Latino)	6
Guatemala (Monitor Latino)	4
Honduras (Monitor Latino)	11
Hungary (Single Top 40)	30
Latin America (Monitor Latino)	6
Mexico (Monitor Latino)	3
Mexico Airplay (Billboard)	1
Netherlands (Dutch Top 40)	19
Netherlands (Single Top 100)	62
Nicaragua Pop (Monitor Latino)	7
Panama (Monitor Latino)	12
Panama (PRODUCE)	11
Paraguay Pop (Monitor Latino)	2
Peru Pop (Monitor Latino)	2
Poland (Polish Airplay Top 100)	5
Puerto Rico (Monitor Latino)	10
Romania (Radiomonitor)	14
Spain (PROMUSICAE)	74
Switzerland (Schweizer Hitparade)	75
US Hot Latin Songs (Billboard)	15
US Latin Airplay (Billboard)	1
US Latin Pop Airplay (Billboard)	1
US Latin Rhythm Airplay (Billboard)	1
Venezuela (Monitor Latino)	9

=== Monthly charts ===
Monthly chart position for "Me Pasé"
Chart (2021)	Peak position
Paraguay (SGP)	20

=== Year-end charts ===
Year-end chart performance for "Me Pasé"
Chart (2021)	Position
Honduras (Monitor Latino)	60
Latin America (Monitor Latino)	58
Mexico (Monitor Latino)	44
Netherlands (Dutch Top 40)	74
Poland (ZPAV)	80
Puerto Rico (Monitor Latino)	26
US Hot Latin Songs (Billboard)	54
US Latin Airplay (Billboard)	16
US Latin Pop Songs (Billboard)	6
Chart (2022)	Position
US Latin Pop Songs (Billboard)	38

== Certifications ==
Certifications for "Me Pasé"
Region	Certification	Certified units/sales
Mexico (AMPROFON)	Gold	70,000^{‡}
Poland (ZPAV)	Gold	25,000^{‡}
Spain (Promusicae)	Gold	30,000^{‡}
^{‡} Sales+streaming figures based on certification alone.

== See also ==
- List of Billboard Hot Latin Songs and Latin Airplay number ones of 2021
