= Enrique Iglesias =

Spanish singer (born 1975)

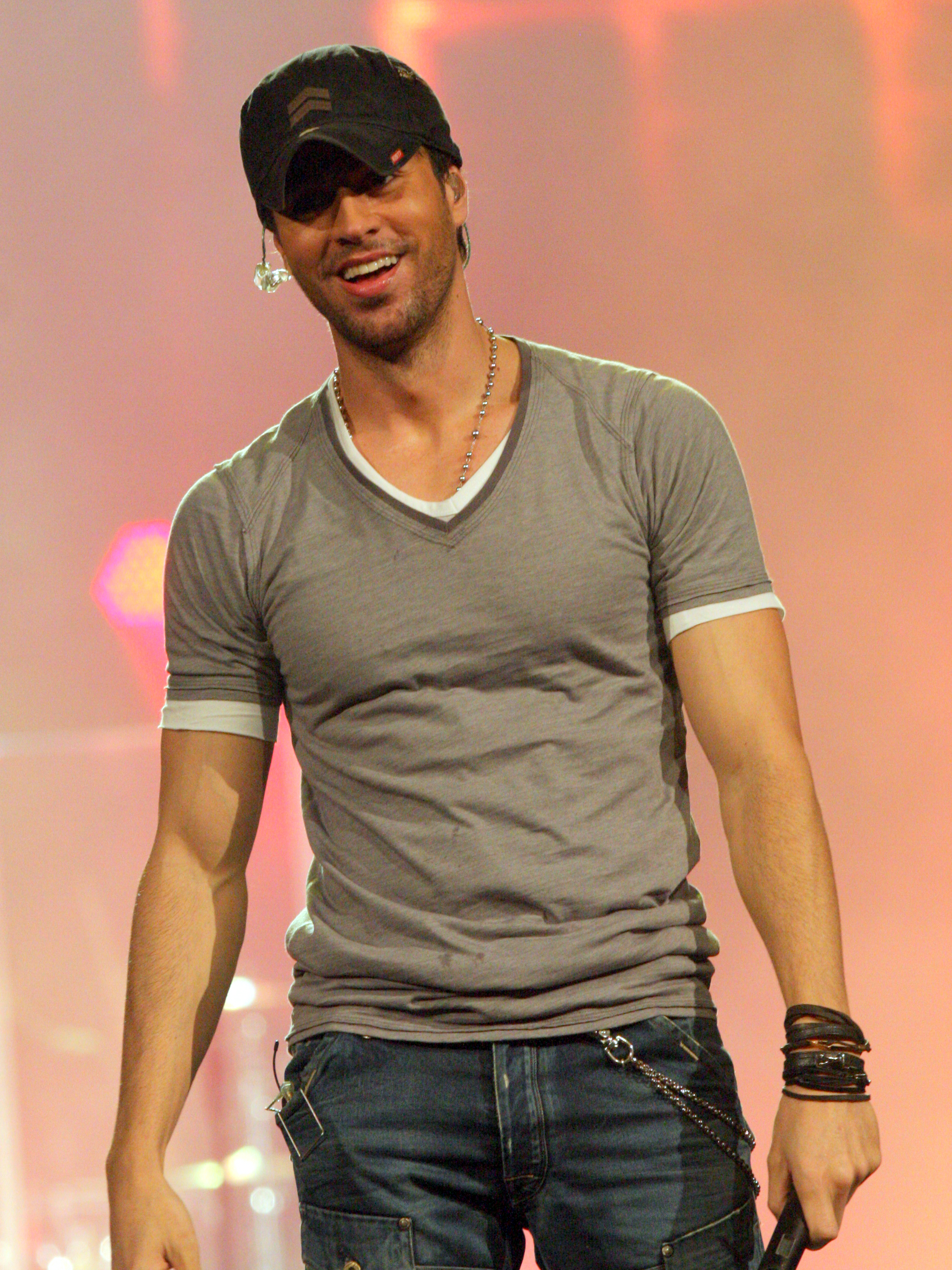
- Iglesias in 2011
- Born: Enrique Miguel Iglesias Preysler; 8 May 1975 (age 51); Madrid, Spain
- Education: Gulliver Preparatory School; University of Miami
- Occupations: Singer; songwriter; record producer; composer; actor
- Years active: 1995–present
- Works: Discography
- Partner: Anna Kournikova (2001–present)
- Children: 4
- Parents: Julio Iglesias; Isabel Preysler
- Relatives: Chabeli Iglesias (sister); Julio Iglesias Jr. (brother); Tamara (half-sister); Neile Adams (grand-aunt); Steven R. McQueen (second cousin)
- Awards: Full list
- Musical career
- Origin: Miami-Dade County, Florida, U.S.
- Genres: Latin pop, pop, R&B, pop rock, alternative rock
- Instrument: Vocals
- Labels: Fonovisa; Universal; Interscope; Republic; Sony; RCA
- Website: enriqueiglesias.com

Enrique Miguel Iglesias Preysler (Note: In this Spanish name, the first or paternal surname is Iglesias and the second or maternal family name is Preysler.) (Spanish pronunciation: [enˈrike miˈɣel iˈɣlesjas ˈpɾejsleɾ]; born 8 May 1975) is a Spanish singer and songwriter. He started his recording career in the mid-1990s on the Mexican label Fonovisa where he released three Spanish albums: Enrique Iglesias, Vivir and Cosas del Amor, becoming the bestselling Spanish-language act of the decade. By the turn of the millennium, he made a successful crossover into the mainstream English-language market.

He signed a multi-album deal with Universal Music Group for US$68 million with Interscope Records, releasing a string of hit English albums such as Enrique, Escape, 7, and Insomniac. During this time, he also released Spanish albums such as Quizás and 95/08 Éxitos under Universal Music Latin. In 2010, Iglesias parted with Interscope Records and signed with another Universal Music Group label, Republic Records, where he released two successful bilingual albums, Euphoria and Sex and Love. In 2015, he parted ways with Universal Music Group after over a decade. He signed with Sony Music and subsequently released two more bilingual albums, Final (Vol. 1) and Final (Vol. 2), with Sony Music Latin in Spanish and RCA Records in English.

Iglesias is one of the best-selling Latin music artists with estimated sales of over 100 million albums worldwide. He has had five Billboard Hot 100 top five singles, including two number-ones. Iglesias holds the record for the most number-one songs on the Billboard Hot Latin Songs chart with 27 songs and the Latin Pop Airplay chart with 24 songs. Iglesias holds the number-one position on the Greatest of All-Latin Artists charts and in October 2022 he was honored with the Top Latin Artist of All Time at the Latin Billboard Awards. Iglesias also has 14 number-ones on Billboard's Dance charts, more than any other male artist. He has earned the honorific title King of Latin Pop. In December 2016, Billboard magazine named him the 14th most successful and top male dance club artist of all time.

== Early life ==
Enrique Miguel Iglesias Preysler was born in Madrid, the third and youngest child of Spanish singer Julio Iglesias and Spanish-Filipina socialite and magazine journalist Isabel Preysler. Iglesias was raised with two older siblings, Chábeli and Julio Jr. One of his mother's aunts is actress Neile Adams, the first wife of American actor Steve McQueen, mother of actor Chad McQueen, and grandmother of actor Steven R. McQueen. His father's family is from Galicia and Andalusia; his father also claims some Jewish ancestry on his mother's side.

Iglesias later learned that he was born with a rare congenital condition known as situs inversus, in which some of the body's major organs, such as the heart, are situated on the opposite side of the body from where they would normally be located.

At first, Iglesias and his two siblings stayed with their mother; however, in December 1981, Iglesias's grandfather Dr. Julio Iglesias Puga was kidnapped by the armed Basque group ETA. For their safety, Enrique and his brother Julio were sent to live with their father in Miami. There, they were brought up mostly by their nanny, Elvira Olivares, to whom Enrique later dedicated his first album.

Iglesias attended Gulliver Preparatory School, a private high school in Miami, where he developed an interest in writing songs. After graduating from high school, he attended the University of Miami in Coral Gables, Florida, where he studied business but dropped out after a year to pursue a recording career.

== Music career ==
=== 1995–1996: Enrique Iglesias ===
Iglesias did not want his father to know about his plans for a music career and did not want his famous surname to help advance his career. In secret, he borrowed money from his family's nanny and recorded a demo cassette tape which consisted of a Spanish song and two English songs. He approached his father's former publicist, Fernán Martínez, the two promoted the songs under the stage name Enrique Martínez with the backstory of being a singer from Guatemala. Mexican record label Fonovisa signed him, and he temporarily moved to Canada to record his first album.

On 21 November 1995, Iglesias released Enrique Iglesias, a collection of light rock ballads, including hits such as "Si Tú Te Vas" (If You Go Away) and "Experiencia Religiosa" (Religious Experience). The record was released by label Fonovisa, along with Iglesias's following two albums. The record sold half a million copies in its first week, a then rare accomplishment for an album recorded in a language other than English. The record also ended up being certified Gold in another non-Spanish-speaking territory (Portugal) in its first week of release. The album sold one million copies in its first three months and went Platinum in the United States.

His song "Por Amarte" was included in Televisa's telenovela Marisol, but with a twist: instead of Por amarte daría mi vida (To love you, I'd give my life), the words were edited to suit the show, with Por amarte Marisol, moriría (To love you, Marisol, I'd die). The album also showcased Iglesias's prowess as a polyglot, releasing both Italian and Portuguese editions, with most of the songs being sung in those languages.

Five singles were released from the album, including "Por Amarte", "No Llores Por Mí" (Don't Cry for Me) and "Trapecista" (Trapezist), all of which topped several of Billboard's Latin music charts. The album still holds the record for most number-one singles on Billboard's Hot Latin Songs chart. The album went on to win Iglesias the Grammy Award for Best Latin Pop Performance.

=== 1997–1998: Vivir and Cosas del Amor ===
In 1997, Iglesias's stardom continued to rise with the release of Vivir (To Live), which elevated him to the levels of popular English-language musicians (in sales) that year. The album also included a cover version of the Yazoo song "Only You", translated into Spanish as "Solo en Ti". Three singles were released from Vivir: "Enamorado Por Primera Vez" (In Love For the First Time), "Solo en Ti", and "Miente" (Lie), which topped the Billboard Hot Latin Songs chart as well as the charts of several Spanish-speaking countries. Along with his father and Luís Miguel, Iglesias was nominated for an American Music Award in the first-ever awarded category of Favorite Latin Artist. Iglesias lost out to his father, but performed the song "Lluvia Cae" (Rain is Falling) at the event.

Insistent on playing large stadiums for his first concert tour that summer, Iglesias, backed by sidemen for Elton John, Bruce Springsteen, and Billy Joel, played to sold-out audiences in sixteen countries. Beginning in Odessa, Texas, the tour went on to play three consecutive nights in Mexico City's Plaza de Toros, two nights at Monterrey's Auditorio Coca-Cola, and two nights (with over 50,000 attendees each) at the Estadio Ciudad de La Plata in Argentina, totaling over 130,000 people. Additionally, Iglesias toured to 19 large indoor arenas in the U.S. In 1998, Iglesias released his third album Cosas del Amor (Things of Love). Taking a more mature musical direction, the album, aided by the popular singles "Esperanza" (Hope) and "Nunca Te Olvidaré" (I'll Never Forget You), both of which topped the Billboard Hot Latin Songs chart and helped cement his status in the Latin music scene.

Iglesias did a shorter tour of smaller venues to accompany the release of the album, with one show being televised from Acapulco, México. This was followed by another larger world tour, consisting of over 80 shows, in even bigger venues. The Cosas del Amor Tour was the first ever concert tour sponsored by McDonald's. He won the American Music Award for Favorite Latin Artist for a second time, this time winning against Ricky Martin and Chayanne. The song "Nunca te Olvidaré" was also used as the theme song for a Spanish soap opera of the same name, and Iglesias guest-starred and sang the song live on the finale episode of the series.

=== 1999–2007: English market success ===
In 1999, Iglesias began a successful crossover career into the English-language pop music market. Thanks to other successful Latin crossover acts, most notably Ricky Martin, Jennifer Lopez, and soon thereafter Shakira, Spanish-language and Latino musicians experienced a great surge in popularity amongst the public. After attending one of Iglesias's concerts in March 1999, American actor Will Smith asked Iglesias to contribute a song to the soundtrack of his upcoming movie Wild Wild West; Iglesias's contribution of "Bailamos" was released as a single that year, becoming an international hit and peaking at number one on the US Billboard Hot 100. Following the success of "Bailamos", several mainstream record labels were eager to sign Iglesias. Signing a multi-album deal, after weeks of negotiations with Interscope, Iglesias recorded and released his first full record in English, Enrique. The pop album featured some clear Latin musical influences and took two months to complete. It contained the popular song "Rhythm Divine", a duet with Whitney Houston titled "Could I Have This Kiss Forever", and a cover of Bruce Springsteen's song "Sad Eyes".

In 2000, Iglesias performed at the Super Bowl XXXIV halftime show with Christina Aguilera, Phil Collins and Toni Braxton. Shock jock Howard Stern repeatedly played a tape of a (supposedly) very off-key Iglesias on his radio show, accusing him of "not being able" to sing live. On 8 June 2000, Iglesias came to New York and sang the song, live and unplugged, on Stern's show with just an accompanying guitarist. After the performance, the two had an interview, and Stern remarked, "I respect you for coming in here; you really can sing." Iglesias noted that the recording could have been him, but that it was probably a recording made during a television taping where he was required to lip sync and not sing properly. He would remark that the controversy was the best promotion he could have. The album's single "Be with You" became Iglesias's second number-one single on Billboard's Hot 100 chart.

In 2001, Iglesias released his second English-language album Escape. Where most of the Latin crossover acts of the previous year experienced some difficulty matching the record sales of their first English-language albums, Iglesias actually went on to sell even more, with the album being certified Diamond for shipments of over 10 million copies. The album's first single, "Hero", became a number-one hit in the United Kingdom and in many other countries. The entire album was co-written by Iglesias. Escape is his biggest commercial success to date. The singles "Escape" and "Don't Turn Off the Lights" became radio staples, placing highly or topping various charts both in North America and elsewhere. A second edition of the album was released internationally and contained a new version of one of Iglesias's favorite tracks, "Maybe", as well as a duet with Lionel Richie called "To Love a Woman".

Iglesias capitalized on the album's success with his "One-Night Stand World Tour" consisting of fifty sold-out shows in sixteen countries. Including Radio City Music Hall and three consecutive nights in London's Royal Albert Hall, the tour ended with a big show at Lia Manoliu Stadium in Bucharest, Romania. The concert launched MTV Romania, with the video for "Love to See You Cry" being the first music video to be shown on the channel. In 2002, Iglesias decided to release a fourth Spanish-language album titled Quizás (Perhaps). A more polished musical production than his previous Spanish albums and containing more introspective songs, the album's title track is a song about the strained relationship Iglesias has with his famous father.

The album debuted at number twelve on the Billboard 200 albums chart, the highest placement of a Spanish-language album on the chart at that period. Quizás sold a million copies in a week, making it the fastest-selling album in Spanish in five years. All three singles released from the album all ended up topping the Latin chart, giving Iglesias a total of sixteen number ones on the chart. He currently holds the record for the most number-one singles on Billboard's Latin Chart. With the song "Para Qué La Vida", Iglesias reached a million spins on U.S. radio, becoming the first Latin act to do so. The video to the song "Quizás" was the first Spanish-language music video to be added to the selection on MTV's popular show Total Request Live.The album went on to win the Latin Grammy Award for Best Pop Vocal Album. That year he embarked on an arena tour of the Americas. The "Don't Turn Off the Lights" tour was completed in the summer of 2002, with two sold-out nights in Madison Square Garden and another two in Mexico's National Auditorium. The tour finished with a single show in the Roberto Clemente Coliseum in San Juan, Puerto Rico.

By 2003, Iglesias had released his seventh album, which he called 7, the second to be entirely co-written by him. The album's sound was heavily influenced by 80s rock and pop. The album features the song "Roamer", which he wrote with his friend and longtime guitarist Tony Bruno and also featured an appearance from Kara DioGuardi, it also contains "Be Yourself", a song about independence; the chorus talks about how Iglesias's parents did not believe he'd ever succeed in his singing career. The first single was the song "Addicted", and was followed closely by a remix of the song "Not in Love", featuring Kelis which was a hit in the UK, Australia, Europe and Asia. The Seven World Tour was sponsored by Pepsi with Iglesias featuring in a commercial alongside Britney Spears, Beyoncé, and Pink, and a second ad which featured Not In Love. His biggest world tour to date started with twelve shows in the United States ending with Iglesias playing at Houston Rodeo, and continued on to several countries, most of which he'd never previously visited, playing to sold-out stadiums and arenas in Australia, India, Egypt, and Singapore, before ending his tour in South Africa.

=== 2007–2009: Insomniac, 95/08 Éxitos and Greatest Hits ===
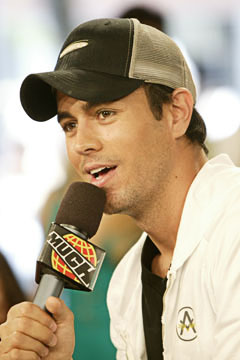
Iglesias in 2007

After a two-year hiatus, Iglesias released his new album Insomniac on 12 June 2007. The album was so named due to it being recorded mainly at night. The record had a more contemporary pop style than that of his previous albums. Its highlights include his first collaboration with a rapper on "Push", featuring Lil Wayne, as well as "Ring My Bells" which was featured on the commercial for Tommy Hilfiger's True Star Men and a cover of Ringside's "Tired of Being Sorry". The album's first single, "Do You Know? (The Ping Pong Song)", was released on 10 April 2007. It was Iglesias's highest-charting song on the Billboard Hot 100 since "Escape". The song was also a hit throughout Europe, peaking in the top 10 in many countries. The Spanish version of the song, titled "Dímelo", was number one on the Billboard Hot Latin Songs chart for eleven weeks. Iglesias followed up with the ballad "Somebody's Me", which was released as a single in North America. The song was played extensively on AC radio and peaked high on Billboard's Hot AC. In Europe, the second single was "Tired of Being Sorry", which performed well in many countries; he recorded a version of the song with French singer Nâdiya, which was number one in France for eleven weeks. A solo version of "Push" was added to the soundtrack of the movie Step Up 2 the Streets. The song was regarded as the third single from the album. A music video was released which features the film's lead actors.

On 4 July 2007, Iglesias became the first Western artist to play a concert in Syria in three decades when he performed for a sold-out crowd of ten thousand in the capital Damascus and in the same week, he performed on Live Earth in Hamburg. The Insomniac World Tour was launched at the Coca-Cola Dome in Johannesburg, South Africa, the same venue he ended his last world tour, and took him to sold-out arenas throughout Europe. It was his first arena tour of the UK, with him playing venues such as Manchester's MEN Arena and Wembley Arena. The tour ended with Iglesias performing at the newly opened L.A. Live. A second leg of the tour took him throughout Latin America. Iglesias's song "Can You Hear Me" was chosen as the official song of the UEFA Euro 2008 football tournament. He performed the song live at the 29 June 2008 final in Vienna, Austria. The song featured on a re-issue of Insomniac, which was released in certain countries.

Iglesias released a Spanish greatest hits album titled 95/08 Éxitos on 25 March 2008, which included his seventeen number-one songs on the Billboard Hot Latin Songs chart plus two new songs. The first single was the song "¿Dónde Están Corazón?", which was written by Argentine star Coti, and became Iglesias's eighteenth number-one single on Billboard's Hot Latin Songs. The album debuted at number one on Billboard's Top Latin Albums chart and number eighteen on the overall Billboard 200 albums chart. It was Iglesias's second Spanish album to debut in the top 20 of the Billboard 200 (Quizás debuted at number twelve in 2002). The album was certified double Platinum (Latin field) in the U.S. The record's second single, "Lloro Por Ti", also reached number one on the Hot Latin Songs chart and had an official remix featuring Wisin & Yandel. Iglesias did a tour of the US to promote the compilation. Beginning in Laredo, Texas, and ending at the Izod Center in New Jersey, he was accompanied through most of the tour with bachata band Aventura, who also performed "Lloro Por Ti" with him at the 2008 Premios Juventud.

Iglesias was a surprise performer at the 2008 Lo Nuestro Awards, opening the show with a medley of "¿Dónde Están Corazón?" and "Dímelo". He also performed at the Billboard Latin Music Awards. After the success of his Spanish greatest hits compilation, Iglesias released a compilation of his English-language hits on 11 November. The album includes "Can You Hear Me" as well as two new songs. The first single, "Away", features Sean Garrett, and was followed by "Takin' Back My Love", featuring Ciara. The album debuted at number three on the official UK Albums Chart where it went double Platinum in both the UK and Ireland.

Iglesias was the winner of two World Music Awards in the categories of "World's Best Selling Latin Performer" and "World's Best Selling Spanish Artist" at the ceremony held in Monaco on 9 November 2008.

=== 2010–2011: Euphoria ===
On 5 July 2010, Iglesias released his ninth studio album Euphoria, his first work to be released under his new label Universal Republic. The album is Iglesias's first bilingual album, with seven original English songs and six original Spanish songs. Iglesias worked with three producers whom he had collaborated with before: RedOne, Mark Taylor, and Carlos Paucar. In a joint venture with Universal Latino, Iglesias released different singles in both English and Spanish simultaneously to different formats.

The first English single from the album, "I Like It", which features the rapper Pitbull, was released on 3 May 2010 in the U.S. and became a success, reaching No. 4 on the Billboard Hot 100. The song was also featured in the MTV reality series Jersey Shore. "Cuando Me Enamoro" was released as the lead Spanish single from the album, and became the theme song of the Mexican telenovela of the same title, produced by Televisa. The song debuted at number eight and number twenty-five on the U.S. Latin Pop Songs chart and the U.S. Hot Latin Songs chart, respectively. It became his twenty-fifth top ten single on the U.S. Billboard Hot Latin Songs chart and after four weeks of its release date, it became his twenty-first No.1 song on this chart. In Europe and Asia Iglesias releases Heartbeat with Nicole Scherzinger which became a Top 10 in many EU countries. In Australia there was a remix with Havana Brown and a Bollywood version with Sunidhi Chauhan was released in India.

In January 2011, the album's third English single, "Tonight (I'm Fuckin' You)" featuring Ludacris and DJ Frank E broke into the top ten on the Billboard Hot 100, also reaching No. 4. The song was released only for digital download in the United States but was featured on some editions of Euphoria in Europe and some Asian areas. The song became Iglesias' first number one on the U.S. Pop Songs and Radio Songs airplay charts. A remix version of the album track "Dirty Dancer" with Usher and Lil Wayne was released as the fourth English single and became his ninth Hot Dance Club Play chart topper, tying with Prince and Michael Jackson as the male with the most No. 1 dance singles. In the Latin market he released the song No Me Digas Que No which was his third collaboration with Wisin y Yandel and topped the Hot Latin Songs chart. Further, "Ayer" served as the album's third Spanish single and seventh single overall. The Euphoria Tour took Iglesias across the U.S., Canada, the U.K., and several European countries. One of the tour's legs took him to Australia, while fellow artist Pitbull joined him as an opening act. Prince Royce also served as opening act during the tour's second leg across North America.

Euphoria won the Billboard Music Award for Top Latin Album, the Billboard Latin Awards for Latin Album of the Year and Latin Pop Album of the Year, and was nominated for the Latin Grammy Award for Album of the Year.

In August 2011, Iglesias released the single "I Like How It Feels" to radio. He would perform the track alongside Tonight (I'm Lovin' You) and I Like It and the 2011 American Music Awards and the Dallas Cowboys vs Miami Dolphins Thanksgiving halftime show along Ludacris and Pitbull.

=== 2012–2014: Sex and Love ===
On 25 August 2012, Iglesias unveiled his brand new single, "Finally Found You", a collaboration with American rapper Sammy Adams. It was released to the US iTunes Store on 25 September 2012. The song was released in UK on 9 December 2012. On 8 December 2012, Iglesias performed at the second annual iHeartRadio Festival where he confirmed he was working on a new album.

That same year he embarked on a co-headline tour of North America with Jennifer Lopez. Later that year he returned to India in October 2012 to perform another series of shows called Tri-City tour in Pune, Delhi, and Bangalore playing to sold-out arenas and stadiums. On 31 May 2013, Iglesias performed at the Mawazine Festival in Rabat, Morocco. The show broke the highest attendance record as more than 120,000 fans gathered to watch the concert.

Iglesias released a number of singles prior to the album release, the first of which was "Turn the Night Up" followed by "Heart Attack" which was released to US Top 40 radio stations. Latin stations were served with the song "Loco", a smooth bachata duet with urban bachata superstar Romeo Santos. The single became Iglesias' 24th No. 1 on the Billboard's Hot Latin Songs chart. A version of the song released in Spain featured Spanish Flamenco singer India Martinez and topped the charts in Spain. This was followed by El Perdedor, a duet with Mexican singer Marco Antonio Solis and was the theme to the telenovela Lo que la vida me robó. The song became his 24th No. 1 on the Latin charts.

On 14 March 2014, Iglesias released his tenth studio album, Sex and Love. The release of the album was accompanied by the single I'm a Freak and featured Pitbull. The album also featured a duet with Kylie Minogue called "Beautiful", which appears on her twelfth studio album Kiss Me Once. In addition to the previously stated collaborations, the album featured guest appearances by Flo Rida, Yandel, Juan Magan, Jennifer Lopez, and Gente de Zona.

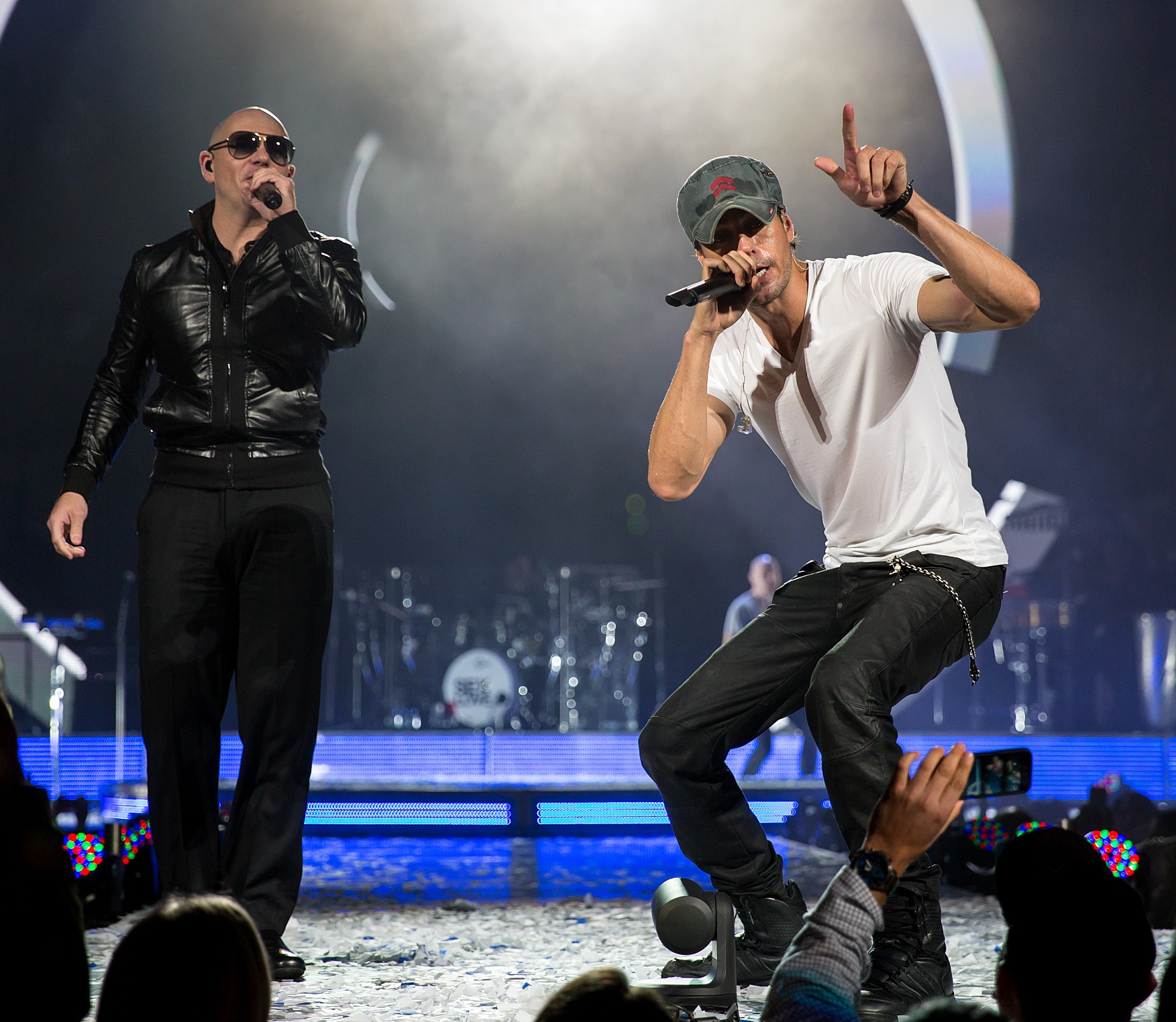
Iglesias performing with Pitbull at the Frank Erwin Center in Austin, Texas, 2015

The next single to be released from the album was "Bailando", featuring Descemer Bueno, and Gente De Zona. "Bailando" was immensely successful becoming his 25th No. 1 on Billboard Hot Latin Songs chart. "Bailando" was No. 1 for 41 consecutive weeks on Billboard's Hot Latin songs chart becoming the longest- reigningnumber-one in the history of the chart beating the record previously held by Shakira's 25 week run. This record was later broken in 2017 when "Despacito" by Luis Fonsi and Daddy Yankee featuring Justin Bieber. "Bailando" was also a crossover success in part due to a Spanglish version of the song which featured rapper Sean Paul, which saw the song peak at No. 12 on Billboard's Hot 100 and Top 10 on the airplay chart, becoming the highest charting Spanish song since the Macarena in 1996. The original Spanish music video of the song was also YouTube's second most- watched music video of 2014, behind Katy Perry's hit singl, "Dark Horse" and was the first Spanish-language video to reach a billion views on the platform. "Bailando" currently has over 3 billion views on YouTube. The song won three Latin Grammy Awards, including Song of the Year. In addition to the original Spanish version, Iglesias also released two Portuguese versions of the song featuring the Portuguese singer Mickael Carreira and the Brazilian singer Luan Santana.

Sex and Love was Spotify's 7th most-streamed album worldwide in 2014, and "Bailando" was the most-streamed song in both Mexico and Spain. Iglesias was also called the King of 2014, due to his tenth album, Sex and Love, and his hit single "Bailando". Billboard called him "The Crowd Pleaser" of 2014. After more than a decade with Universal Music, Iglesias left the record label in 2015 and signed on with Sony Music.

=== 2015–present: Final ===
Since the release of Sex and Love, Iglesias continued issuing singles. In 2015, he collaborated with Nicky Jam on the reggaeton megahit "El Perdón" which topped the charts in several countries and has over 1.3 billion views on YouTube. In 2016 Iglesias released his first single under Sony: "Duele el Corazón" featuring Wisin, which also topped the charts in several countries including the US Latin charts and also has over 1 billion views on YouTube. In 2017, Iglesias released "Súbeme la Radio", which features Descemer Bueno and Zion & Lennox. The song has over 1.3 billion views on YouTube. In 2018, Iglesias released two songs, one called "El Baño" with Bad Bunny and the other called "Move to Miami" with Pitbull. The song "Me Pasé" featuring Farruko was released on 1 July 2021 and became a hit on Latin radio topping the Latin Rhythm Airplay chart, as well as extended his record for most No. 1s on Latin Pop Airplay Chart and reclaiming his record for most No. 1s on the Latin Airplay Chart.

Enrique announced his next album would be released in two volumes and be called Final, as he stated they would be his last albums. Iglesias claimed, "it's something that I have been thinking about for the past few years" but also insisted, "I'm never going to stop writing songs because I love writing songs, but I'm going to do it in a different way, meaning they don't necessarily have to be packaged as an album, so this project to me is important". On 17 September 2021, Iglesias released Final (Vol. 1), which included his string of hits from 2015 onwards as well as new tracks such as the singles "Pendejo", and "Te Fuiste" which featured Puerto Rican rapper Myke Towers. The album has over 3 billion audio streams and was certified 6× Platinum (Latin category) in the US Also in 2021, Iglesias embarked on a co-headline tour with Ricky Martin. The tour was originally planned for a year earlier but was postponed due to the COVID-19 pandemic. The tour consisted of twenty-six arena dates across North America and featured Colombian pop star Sebastian Yatra as the opening act. A year later, Iglesias embarked on another co-headline tour of North America with both Martin and Pitbull named "The Trilogy Tour", which originally consisted of twenty-four dates and a second leg of fourteen dates due to popular demand.

During this period, Iglesias would feature on songs by other artists such as RedOne's "Don't You Need Somebody," Descemer Bueno's "Nos Fuimos Lejos", Matoma's "I Don't Dance (Without You)", Jon Z's "Después Que Te Perdí", Anuel AA's "Fútbol y Rumba" and a remix of "Lalala" by Y2K, Bbno$ and also was featured by Carly Rae Jepsen. On 29 September 2023, Iglesias returned to Latin and Spanish radio stations with the song "Asi Es La Vida" the first single from Final Vol. 2. a duet with Argentine star Maria Becerra, becoming his eighth No. 1 on Billboard's Tropical Airplay chart. In February 2024, Iglesias released "Fría" to Latin-pop formats, which featured Cuban singer Yotuel. Later that month, he released "Space in My Heart" a duet with Country Star Miranda Lambert, which returned him to the Adult Top 40. The Spanish version of the song was used as the theme to the telenovela Corazón Guerrero.

On 29 March 2024, Iglesias released Final Vol. 2, which included a mixture of genres such as Pop, Dance Bachata, Reggaeton, Cumbia and Dembow. The album contains productions from longtime collaborators like Metrophonic, RedOne and Carlos Paucar as well as the Space Primates. In addition to the previously featured songs, the album also featured the King of Dembow El Alfa on "La Botella" and a duet with the Mexican Spanish Pop Princess Belinda on "Llorame Un Rio".

== Songwriting, producing, and acting ==
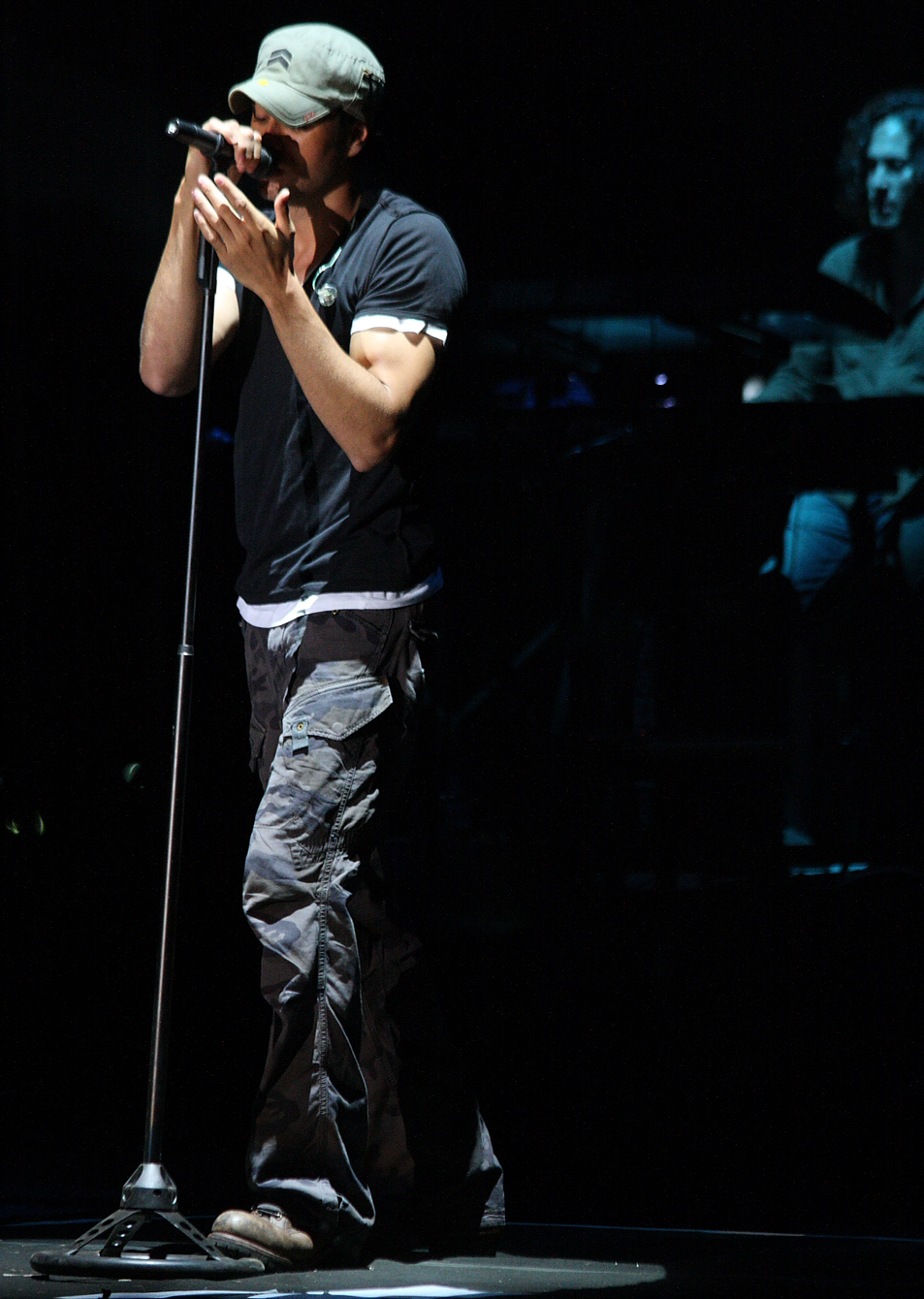
Iglesias in 2018

Iglesias has collaborated with songwriter Guy Chambers to write "Un Nuovo Giorno", the lead single from Andrea Bocelli's first pop album Andrea (2004). The song was later translated into English as "First Day of My Life" and recorded by Spice Girl Melanie C for her album Beautiful Intentions (2005). The song has since gone to become a huge hit throughout Europe, and peaked in the number one spot in numerous countries. Iglesias also co-wrote the single "The Way" for American Idol runner-up Clay Aiken. Four songs co-written by Iglesias appear on the UK band The Hollies' 2006 album Staying Power. In 2010, Idol Allstars (Swedish Idol Series) released the song "All I Need Is You", co-written by Iglesias with Andreas Carlsson, Kalle Engström, and Kristian Lundin. He also co-wrote Jennifer Lopez's song "Dance Again", which was released in 2012, and reached the number one position in the Billboard Hot Dance Club Songs.

In 2000, Iglesias co-produced an off-Broadway musical called Four Guys Named Jose and Una Mujer Named Maria. In the musical, four Americans of Latin heritage possess a common interest in music and meet and decide to put on a show. The show contained many references and allusions to many classic and contemporary Latin and pop songs by the likes of Carmen Miranda, Selena, Ritchie Valens, Chayanne, Ricky Martin, and Iglesias himself.

Iglesias starred alongside Antonio Banderas, Salma Hayek, and Johnny Depp in the Robert Rodriguez film Once Upon a Time in Mexico, in which he played the well-spoken gun-wielding Lorenzo. In 2007, he had a guest appearance in the TV comedy Two and a Half Men as a carpenter/handyman.

He also guest-starred as Gael, an Argentinean guitar playing/surfer/massage therapist love interest of Robin in season 3 of the TV show How I Met Your Mother.

Iglesias also played the part of an evil Roman emperor in a Pepsi ad in 2004, as well as appearing in commercials for Tommy Hilfiger, Doritos, and Viceroy watches.

== Personal life ==
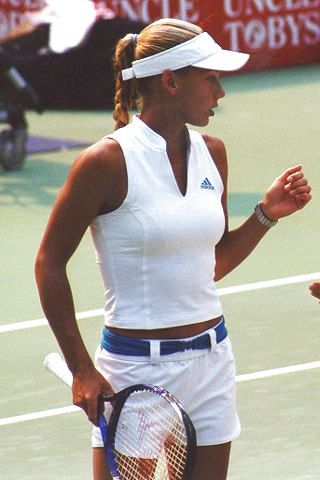
Anna Kournikova

Since 2001, Iglesias has been in a relationship with Russian tennis player Anna Kournikova. They have fraternal twins, a boy and a girl born in 2017, a daughter born in 2020 and a son born in 2025. They reside in Miami.

In 2003, Iglesias had surgery to remove a circular mole from the right side of his face, citing concerns that over time it could become cancerous.

== Philanthropy ==
In 2010, Iglesias was included in the project Download to Donate, run by Music for Relief, an organization started by American rock band Linkin Park. He co-produced Download to Donate for Haiti, a charity album for the 2010 Haiti earthquake, with the co-vocalist of the band Mike Shinoda. Both of them promoted the album at various venues, one of them being Larry King Live, where he and Shinoda explained the project.

In 2013, Iglesias urged his followers to donate money through the American Red Cross to help the victims of the deadly Typhoon Haiyan in the Philippines. The typhoon struck one month after the Philippines was hit by a 7.2-magnitude earthquake which destroyed homes and livelihoods of around 350,000 people.

In 2015, Iglesias partnered with Save the Children to launch a heart T-shirt campaign. The design was inspired by a heart he drew on his bloodstained T-shirt after injuring his hand with a drone during a concert in Tijuana. All net proceeds or approximately $11–12 per shirt were directed to Save the Children’s Children’s Emergency Fund or HEART program in Mexico.

Iglesias has supported City of Hope, Habitat for Humanity, Help for Heroes, Live Earth, the Muscular Dystrophy Association, Special Olympics, The Salvation Army, and charitable causes like Alex's Lemonade Stand Foundation and hunger relief.

== Discography ==
Studio albums

- Enrique Iglesias (1995)
- Vivir (1997)
- Cosas del Amor (1998)
- Enrique (1999)
- Escape (2001)
- Quizás (2002)
- 7 (2003)
- Insomniac (2007)
- Euphoria (2010)
- Sex and Love (2014)
- Final (Vol. 1) (2021)
- Final (Vol. 2) (2024)

== Filmography ==
=== Film and television roles ===
Year	Title	Role	Notes
2003	Once Upon a Time in Mexico	Lorenzo	Debut in Hollywood
2007	How I Met Your Mother	Gael	Two episodes: "Wait for It" and "We're Not from Here"
2007	Two and a Half Men	Fernando	Episode: "Anteaters. They're Just Crazy-Lookin'"

=== Soundtrack and self appearances ===
Year	Film	Role	Notes
1996	Late Show with David Letterman	Himself	US Network Television Debut. Performing Experiencia Religiosa
1997	39th Annual Grammy Awards	Himself	Presenter and award winner for Best Latin Pop Performance
1997	The Tonight Show with Jay Leno	Himself	Performing Enamorado Por Primera Vez
1997	Lo Nuestro Awards	Himself	Performing Enamorado Por Primera Vez & Solo en ti
1997	Miss Universe 1997	Himself	Performing a mixed language version of Solo En Ti
1997	American Music Awards of 1997	Himself	Performing Lluvia Cae
1997	Vibe	Himself	Performing Lluvia Cae
1997	Fools Rush In	Si Tú Te Vas	Soundtrack
1998	The Roseanne Show	Himself	Performing Esperanza
1998	The Howie Mandel Show	Himself	Performing Esperanza
1998	Donny & Marie	Himself	Performing Esperanza
1998	Nobel Peace Prize Concert	Himself	Performing Esperanza
1998	American Music Awards of 1998	Himself	Presenter and award winner of Favorite Latin Artist
1998	Nunca te olvidaré	Theme song	Theme song and guest performer in the final episode
1999	Wild Wild West	Bailamos	Soundtrack
1999	The Oprah Winfrey Show	Himself	Performing Bailamos
1999	Good Morning America	Himself	Performing Bailamos and Nunca Te Olvidare
1999	The Tonight Show with Jay Leno	Himself	Performing Bailamos
1999	MTV's Fashionably Loud	Himself	Performing Rhythm Divine
1999	The Tonight Show with Jay Leno	Himself	Performing Rhythm Divine
1999	Today Show	Himself	Performing Rhythm Divine and Bailamos
1999	Rockefeller Center Christmas Tree	Himself	Performing Rhythm Divine
1999	The Rosie O'Donnell Show	Himself	Performing Rhythm Divine
1999	Miss World 1999	Himself	Performing Rhythm Divine
2000	American Music Awards	Himself	Performing Rhythm Divine
2000	Super Bowl XXXIV	Himself	Half Time Show performer
2000	The Tonight Show with Jay Leno	Himself	Performing Be with You Be with You
2000	VH1: Men Strike Back	Himself	Performing Be With You, Bailamos, Fire (with Tom Jones) and a group performance of Every Breath You Take
2000	Farmclub.com	Himself	Performing Be With You and Bailamos
2000	Disney Summer Jam	Himself	Performing Be With You and Bailamos
2000	The Rosie O'Donnell Show	Himself	Performing Be With You and Bailamos
2000	Pavarotti & Friends	Himself	Performing Be With You with Lindo Cielito & Luciano Pavarotti
2000	2000 Teen Choice Awards	Himself	Performing Be With You
2000	Blockbuster Entertainment Awards	Himself	Performing Be With You
2000	Billboard Music Awards	Himself	Performing Be With You
2000	Radio Music Awards	Himself	Performing Be With You
2000	GQ Men of the Year Awards	Himself	Performing I Have Always Loved You
2001	America: A Tribute to Heroes	Himself	Performing Hero
2001	Total Request Live	Himself	Performing Hero
2001	The Rosie O'Donnell Show	Himself	Performing Hero
2001	Live with Regis and Kelly	Himself	Performing Hero
2001	The Tonight Show with Jay Leno	Himself	Performing Hero
2001	A Home for the Holidays	Himself	Performing Hero
2001	I Love the New Millennium	Soundtrack	Performing Hero
2001	Smallville Craving	Soundtrack	Performing Hero
2002	NBA All Star Read to Achieve Celebration		Performing Escape
2002	Late Show with David Letterman		Performing Escape
2002	MTV Fashionably Loud		Performing Hero, Escape & Love to See You Cry
2002	The Tonight Show with Jay Leno		Performing Escape
2002	CD:UK		Performing Hero
2002	Top of the Pops		Performing Hero
2002	MTV Asia Awards 2002		Performing Hero
2002	World Music Awards		Performing a medley of Hero & Escape
2002	Lo Nuestro Awards		Performing a medley of Hero & Escape
2002	Parkinson		Performing Escape
2002	An Audience with...Lulu		Performing Escape with Lulu
2002	Total Request Live		Performing Don't Turn Off the Lights
2002	Today Show		Performing Don't Turn Off the Lights, Be with You & Hero
2002	Live with Regis and Kelly		Performing Don't Turn Off the Lights
2002	Last Call with Carson Daly		Performing Don't Turn Off the Lights & One Night Stand
2002	Macy's Fourth of July Fireworks Spectacular		Performing Don't Turn Off the Lights & Hero
2002	Party in the Park		Performing Escape, Love to See You Cry, Hero & La Bamba
2002	MTV Video Music Awards		Presenter
2002	NFL Countdown to Kick Off		Performing Don't Turn Off the Lights, Escape Hero & Be with You
2002	Concert for America		Performing Hero
2002	MTV Europe Music Awards		Performing Maybe & Love to See You Cry (White Wedding version)
2002	Friday Night with Jonathan Ross		Performing Maybe
2002	Royal Variety Performance		Performing Love to See You Cry (White Wedding version) & Hero
2002	Premios Ondas		Performing Quizás
2002	The Tonight Show with Jay Leno		Performing Quizás
2003	Total Request Live	Himself	Performing Addicted
2003	The View	Himself	Performing Addicted
2003	Today Show	Himself	Performing Addicted, Not In Love & Be With You
2003	Rockefeller Christmas Tree Lighting	Himself	Performing Addicted
2003	A Home for the Holidays	Himself	Performing Addicted
2003	The Tonight Show with Jay Leno	Himself	Performing Not in Love
2003	The Ellen DeGeneres Show	Himself	
2003	The Sharon Osbourne Show	Himself	
2003	Scrubs: "My Friend the Doctor"	Hero	Soundtrack
2004	Music 2004: Britney Exclusive	Evil emperor	TV ad
2004	On Air with Ryan Seacrest	Himself	Premier episode performing Not in Love
2004	Jimmy Kimmel Live!	Himself	Co-host for a week and also performing Not in Love
2004	The Wayne Brady Show	Himself	Performing Not in Love
2005	Oprah Winfrey Show	Himself	Surprising and spending a day with a fan
2005	Premios Juventud 2005	Himself	Host
2005	La Noche del 10	Himself	Final episode. Performed Nunca Te Olvidare & Bailamos
2005	Una Noche De Paz: A Very Special Latin Christmas	Himself	Performed Nunce Te Olvidare & Bailamos
2006	Extreme Makeover: Home Edition	Himself	Performing Somebody's Me
2006	Zoom	Hero	Soundtrack
2007	Dancing with the Stars	Himself	Performing Hero & Do You Know?
2007	The Ellen DeGeneres Show	Himself	Performing Do You Know
2007	The Graham Norton Show	Himself	Performing Do You Know
2007	This Morning	Himself	Performing Do You Know
2007	Live with Regis and Kelly	Himself	Performing Do You Know & Be With You
2007	Today Show	Himself	Performing Do You Know, Be With You & Escape
2007	Live Earth	Himself	Performing Bailamos, Be With You, Don't You Forget About Me & Escape
2007	The Late Late Show with Craig Ferguson	Himself	Performing Do You Know
2007	Premios Juventud	Himself	Performing a medley of Alguien Soy Yo & Dimelo
2007	So You Think You Can Dance	Himself	Performing Somebody's Me
2007	Live with Regis and Kelly	Himself	Co-host and performing Somebody's Me
2007	The Young and the Restless	Himself	Performing Somebody's Me
2007	Canadian Idol	Himself	Performing Somebody's Me & Be With You
2007	The Paul O'Grady Show	Himself	Performing Tired of Being Sorry
2007	National Lottery	Himself	Performing Tired of Being Sorry
2007	Eurovision Dance Contest	Himself	Performing a medley of Tired of Being Sorry" and "Do You Know?
2007	The Royal Variety Performance	Himself	Performing Tired Of Being Sorry
2007	Star Academy	Himself	Performing Do You Know with a contestant
2007	America's Next Top Model, Cycle 9: "The Girls Who Crawl"	Himself	Special guest
2008	Tonight Show with Jay Leno	Himself	Performing Push
2008	Live with Regis and Kelly	Himself	Performing Push
2008	Rachael Ray	Himself	Guest
2008	Noche de Estrellas	Himself	Performing ¿Dónde Están Corazón? and Nunca Te Olvidare with Yuri
2008	Today Show	Himself	Performing ¿Dónde Están Corazón?, Do You Know, Don't You Forget About Me & Push
2008	Lo Nuestro Awards	Himself	Performing ¿Dónde Están Corazón? & Dimelo
2008	Billboard Latin Music Awards	Himself	Performing ¿Dónde Están Corazón?
2008	Premios Juventud	Himself	Performing Lloro Por Ti with Aventura
2008	UEFA European Championship	Himself	Performing Can You Hear Me
2008	Strictly Come Dancing	Himself	Performing Hero
2008	Here Come the Boys	Himself	Performing Hero
2008	Step Up 2: The Streets	"Push"	Soundtrack
2008	Rob & Big: "Poop in the Pool"	Do You Know?	Soundtrack
2008	Beverly Hills Chihuahua	Hero	Soundtrack
2008	Lady Godiva	Hero	Soundtrack
2009	NFL Pro Bowl Half Time Show	Himself	Performing Takin' Back My Love with Ciara
2009	Loose Women	Himself	Performing Takin' Back My Love with Gabriella Cilmi
2009	The Paul O'Grady Show	Himself	Performing Takin' Back My Love with Gabriella Cilmi
2009	Meteor Music Awards	Himself	Performing Takin' Back My Love with Gabriella Cilmi
2010	GMTV	Himself	Performing I Like It
2010	This Morning	Himself	Interview and performance of I Like It
2010	Alan Carr: Chatty Man	Himself	Interview and performance of I Like It
2010	Tonight Show with Jay Leno	Himself	Performing I Like It
2010	Macy's 4 July Fireworks Spectacular	Himself	Performing I Like It
2010	Live with Regis and Kelly	Himself	Performing I Like It
2010	Today Show	Himself	Performing I Like It with Pitbull, Hero & Be With You
2010	So You Think You Can Dance	Himself	Performing I Like It with Pitbull
2010	Lopez Tonight	Himself	Interview and performing I Like It with Pitbull
2010	Premios Juventud	Himself	Performing Cuando Me Enamoro with Juan Luis Guerra
2010	Lopez Tonight	Himself	Performing Cuando Me Enamoro with Juan Luis Guerra
2010	America's Got Talent	Himself	Performing I Like It
2010	Dancing with the Stars	Himself	Performing I Like It
2010	Latin Grammy Awards	Himself	Performing No Me Digas Que No with Wisin y Yandel and I Like It
2010	American Music Awards	Himself	Performing Tonight (I'm Lovin' You) and I Like It with Pitbull
2010	Eurovoice 2010	Himself	Special guest
2010	El hormiguero	Himself	Guest
2011	The X Factor	Himself	Guest judge along with Nicole Scherzinger
2013	The Voice	Himself	"Bailamos"
2014	El hormiguero 3.0	Himself	Guest
2014	So You Think You Can Dance	Himself	Musical guest (Performing live of Bailando Song featuring Sean Paul)
2015	57th Annual Grammy Awards	Himself	Presenter
2021	El Hormiguero	Himself	Guest

== Tours ==
Headlining

- Vivir World Tour (1997)
- Cosas del Amor World Tour (1998)
- 2000 Tour (2000)
- One Night Stand Tour (2002)
- Don't Turn Off The Lights Tour (2002)
- Seven World Tour (2004)
- Insomniac World Tour (2007)
- 124Greatest Hits Tour (2009)
- Euphoria Tour (2011–12)
- Sex and Love Tour (2014–17)
- All the Hits Live (2018–19)

Co-headlining

- Enrique Iglesias & Jennifer Lopez Tour (with Jennifer Lopez) (2012)
- Enrique & Pitbull on Tour (with Pitbull) (2014–15)
- Enrique Iglesias And Pitbull Live! (with Pitbull) (2017)
- Enrique Iglesias and Ricky Martin Live in Concert (with Ricky Martin) (2021)
- The Trilogy Tour (with Pitbull & Ricky Martin) (2023–24)

== Awards and nominations ==
Iglesias has won more than 200 awards from various ceremonies including 23 Billboard Music Awards and 36 Billboard Latin Music Awards, as well as 8 American Music Awards, 1 Grammy (with 3 times nomination), 5 Latin Grammy Awards, 10 World Music Awards, 6 MTV awards, 19 Premios Lo Nuestro Awards (with 24 times nomination) and 15 Premios Juventud Awards (with 21 times nomination) etc. He has been nominated over 465 times for various awards. He also won an award for Best International Pop Act at the MTV India Awards, as well as being named "King of Latin Pop". In 2000, he was awarded Most Fashionable Artist at the VH1/Vogue Fashion Awards. In 2001, for the release of his second English studio album Escape, he received awards for Best-Selling Pop Male Artist and European Male Artist at the World Music Awards. And for the first time ever in the history of Billboard Music Awards Enrique Iglesias was awarded with "Top Latin Artist of All Time" Title and Award at Billboard Latin Music Awards 2020.

== See also ==
- List of best-selling Latin music artists
