= Fútbol y Rumba =

Song by Anuel AA featuring Enrique Iglesias

from the album Emmanuel
- Language: Spanish
- Released: May 29, 2020
- Genre: Reggaeton
- Length: 3:41
- Label: Real Hasta la Muerte
- Songwriters: Emmanuel Gazmey; Enrique Iglesias; Daniel Echavarría; Frabián Elí
- Producer: Ovy on the Drums

Music video
- "Fútbol y Rumba" on YouTube

"Fútbol y Rumba" (transl. "Football and Rumba") is a song by Puerto Rican rapper Anuel AA, featuring vocals from Spanish singer Enrique Iglesias. It was released on May 29, 2020 as a track on Anuel AA's second studio album Emmanuel, with a music video released on the same day.

== Music video ==
The video was released on May 29, 2020. It showcases celebrities such as Shaquille O'Neal, J Balvin, and Marshmello, as well as soccer stars such as Lionel Messi, Sergio Ramos, and Luis Suárez doing various activities while being quarantined due to the COVID-19 pandemic.

== Charts ==
=== Weekly charts ===
Chart (2020)	Peak position
Bolivia (Monitor Latino)	9
El Salvador (Monitor Latino)	1
Guatemala (Monitor Latino)	3
Honduras (Monitor Latino)	9
Mexico Airplay (Billboard)	2
Mexico (Monitor Latino)	1
Panama (Monitor Latino)	4
Puerto Rico (Monitor Latino)	3
Spain (PROMUSICAE)	6
Switzerland (Schweizer Hitparade)	96
US Bubbling Under Hot 100 (Billboard)	12
US Hot Latin Songs (Billboard)	8
US Latin Airplay (Billboard)	1
US Latin Pop Airplay (Billboard)	1
US Latin Rhythm Airplay (Billboard)	1

=== Year-end charts ===
Chart (2020)	Position
US Hot Latin Songs (Billboard)	59

== Certifications ==
Region	Certification	Certified units/sales
Spain (Promusicae)	Platinum	60,000^{‡}
^{‡} Sales+streaming figures based on certification alone.

== See also ==
- List of Billboard Hot Latin Songs and Latin Airplay number ones of 2020
