= List of awards and nominations received by Enrique Iglesias =

Enrique Iglesias awards and nominations
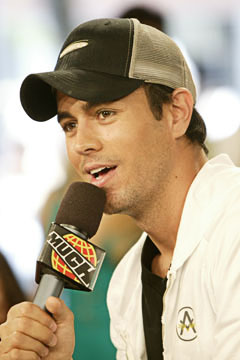
- Iglesias on MuchMusic's MuchOnDemand in Toronto, Ontario
Awards and nominations
Award	Wins	Nominations
American Music Awards	8	14
Billboard	5	15
Grammy	1	4
Juno	0	2
Los Premios MTV Latinoamérica	0	5
MTV Europe	3	12
Much	0	1
NRJ	2	7
People's Choice	0	2
Teen Choice	0	6
World Music	10	11
BMI Latin Awards	7	7
Premio Lo Nuestro Awards	25	47
Billboard Latin Music Awards	43	87
Premios Juventud	15	27
Latin Grammy Awards	5	9
Blockbuster Entertainment Awards	1	3
ASCAP Awards	20	20
Telehit Awards	4	4
Premios Oye!	1	3
Ritmo Latino	1	1

Totals (Note: Certain award groups do not simply award one winner. They acknowledge several different recipients, have runners-up, and have third place. Since this is a specific recognition and is different from losing an award, runner-up mentions are considered wins in this award tally. For simplification and to avoid errors, each award in this list has been presumed to have had a prior nomination.)
- Wins: 359
- Nominations: 542

The following is a comprehensive list of awards received by Spanish singer, songwriter, and actor Enrique Iglesias. To date, Iglesias has sold over 180 million records, making him one of the best selling Latin recording artists of all time. Iglesias has received 359 awards from 542 nominations and was crowned as Billboard's "Top Latin Artist of All Time" for his many achievements, popularity, and contributions to the Latin music charts.

== ACE Awards ==
Year	Nominee / work	Award	Result
1996	Enrique Iglesias	Vocalist of the Year	Won
1997	Enrique Iglesias	Performer of the Year	Won

== ALMA Awards ==
Year	Nominee / work	Award	Result
1999	American Music Awards	Outstanding Performance by an Individual in a Music series	Nominated
2000	"Bailamos"	Outstanding Music Video Performer	Won
2002	Escape	Album of the Year	Nominated
2002	"Hero"	People's Choice : Best Music Video	Nominated
2002	Enrique Iglesias	Best Male Artist in Music	Nominated
2009	Enrique Iglesias	Best of the Year in Music	Nominated
2011	Enrique Iglesias	Best Male Artist in Music	Nominated

== American Music Awards ==
Year	Nominee / work	Award	Result	Ref.
1998	Enrique Iglesias	Favorite Latin Artist	Nominated	
1999	Enrique Iglesias	Favorite Latin Artist	Won	
2000	Enrique Iglesias	Favorite Latin Artist	Nominated	
2001	Enrique Iglesias	Favorite Latin Artist	Won	
2002	Enrique Iglesias	Favorite Latin Artist	Won	
2003	Enrique Iglesias	Favorite Latin Artist	Won	
2003	Enrique Iglesias	Favorite Pop/Rock Male Artist	Nominated	
2003	Enrique Iglesias	Fans Choice Award	Nominated	
2008	Enrique Iglesias	Favorite Latin Artist	Won	
2010	Enrique Iglesias	Favorite Latin Artist	Nominated	
2011	Enrique Iglesias	Favorite Latin Artist	Nominated	
2014	Enrique Iglesias	Favorite Latin Artist	Won	
2015	Enrique Iglesias	Favorite Latin Artist	Won	
2016	Enrique Iglesias	Favorite Latin Artist	Won	

== Latin American Music Awards ==
The Latin American Music Awards (Latin AMAS) is an annual award presented by American television network Telemundo. It is the Spanish-language counterpart of the American Music Awards produced by the Dick Clark Productions.

Year	Nominee / work	Award	Result	Ref.
2015	Enrique Iglesias	Artist of the Year	Won	
2015	Enrique Iglesias	Favorite Male Artist – Pop/Rock	Won	
2015	"El Perdón" (feat Nicky Jam)	Song of the Year	Won	
2015	"El Perdón" (feat Nicky Jam)	Favorite Collaboration	Won	
2015	"El Perdón" (feat Nicky Jam)	Favorite Streaming Song	Won	
2016	Enrique Iglesias	Artist of the Year	Won	
2016	Enrique Iglesias	Favorite Male Artist – Pop/Rock	Won	
2016	"Duele el Corazón" (feat Wisin)	Song of the Year	Won	
2016	"Duele el Corazón" (feat Wisin)	Favorite Song – Pop/Rock	Won	
2016	"Duele el Corazón" (feat Wisin)	Favorite Collaboration	Won	
2018	"El Baño" (feat Bad Bunny)	Favorite Song – Pop	Nominated	
2018	Enrique Iglesias & Pitbull	Favorite Tour	Nominated	
2022	Enrique Iglesias	Favorite Artist – Pop	Nominated	
2022	Final (Vol. 1)	Favorite Album – Pop	Nominated	
2022	Enrique Iglesias & Ricky Martin	Tour of the Year	Won	
2023	Enrique Iglesias	Favorite Artist – Pop	Nominated	

== ARTISTdirect Online Music Awards ==
Year	Nominee / work	Award	Result	Ref.
2000	Enrique Iglesias	Favorite Male Artist	Nominated	
2000	Enrique	Favorite Break-up CD	Nominated	

== ASCAP Awards ==
Year	Nominee / work	Award	Result
1996	"Si Tú Te Vas"	ASCAP Latin Music – Best Compositor	Won
1996	"No Llores Por Mí"	ASCAP Latin Music – Best Compositor	Won
1996	"Por amarte"	ASCAP Latin Music – Best Compositor	Won
2003	"Hero"	ASCAP Pop Music – Song of the Year	Won
2003	"Escape"	ASCAP Pop Music – Most Performed Song	Won
2003	"Escape"	ASCAP Latin Music – Pop/Ballad Winning Song	Won
2004	"Quizas"	ASCAP Latin Music – Pop/Ballad Winning Song	Won
2008	"Dimelo?"	ASCAP Latin Music – Pop/Ballad Winning Song	Won
2009	"¿Dónde Están Corazón?"	ASCAP Latin Music – Song of the Year	Won
2009	"Lloro Por Tí"	ASCAP Latin Music – Pop/Ballad Winning Song	Won
2010	"Lloro Por Tí"	ASCAP Latin Music – Pop/Ballad Winning Song	Won
2011	"Cuando Me Enamoro" (ft. Juan Luis Guerra)	ASCAP Latin Music – Pop/Ballad Winning Song	Won
2011	"I Like It" (ft. Pitbull)	ASCAP Pop Award – Most Performed Song	Won
2012	"Tonight (I'm Lovin' You)" (ft. Ludacris and DJ Frank E)	ASCAP Pop Award – Most Performed Song	Won
2012	"No Me Digas Que No" (ft. Wisin & Yandel)	ASCAP Latin Music – Pop/Ballad Winning Song	Won
2013	"Ayer"	ASCAP Latin Music – Pop/Ballad Winning Song	Won
2014	"Loco" (ft. Romeo Santos)	ASCAP Latin Music – Tropical Winning Song	Won
2015	"El Perdedor" (ft. Marco Antonio Solís)	ASCAP Latin Music – Pop/Ballad Winning Song	Won
2015	"El Perdedor" (ft. Marco Antonio Solís)	ASCAP Latin Music – Television Winning Song	Won
2015	"Bailando" (ft. Descemer Bueno & Gente de Zona)	ASCAP Latin Music – Song of the Year	Won

== Billboard Music Awards ==
Year	Nominee / work	Award	Result
1998	Enrique Iglesias	Best Latin Pop Artist	Won
2000	Enrique Iglesias	Hot 100 – Male Artist of the Year	Nominated
2002	"Hero"	Song of the Year	Nominated
2002	Enrique Iglesias	Top Dance Artist	Nominated
2002	Enrique Iglesias	Top Adult Contemporary Artist	Nominated
2011	Enrique Iglesias	Top Latin Artist	Nominated
2011	Enrique Iglesias	Fan Favorite Award	Nominated
2011	Euphoria	Top Latin Album	Won
2011	"Cuando Me Enamoro" (ft. Juan Luis Guerra)	Top Latin Song	Nominated
2014	"Loco"	Top Latin Song	Nominated
2015	Enrique Iglesias	Top Latin Artist	Nominated
2015	"Sex + Love"	Top Latin Album	Won
2015	"Bailando" (ft. Descemer Bueno & Gente de Zona)	Top Latin Song	Won
2016	"El Perdón" (ft. Nicky Jam)	Top Latin Song	Won
2017	"Duele El Corazon" (ft. Wisin)	Top Latin Song	Nominated

== Billboard Music Video Awards ==
Year	Nominee / work	Award	Result	Ref.
2000	"Ritmo Total"	Best Clip — Latin	Won	

== Billboard Latin Music Award ==
Year	Nominee / work	Award	Result
1996	Enrique Iglesias	Album of the Year – New Artist	Won
1997	Vivir	Album of the Year	Won
1997	Enrique Iglesias	Artist of the Year	Won
2000	Enrique Iglesias	Hot Latin Tracks, Artist of the Year	Won
2000	Enrique Iglesias	Hot Latin Albums, Artist of the Year	Nominated
2000	"Bailamos"	Hot Latin Song of the Year	Nominated
2000	"Bailamos"	Hot Latin Pop Song of the Year	Nominated
2001	The Best Hits	Latin Greatest Hits Album of the Year	Nominated
2001	"Solo Me Importas Tu"	Latin Dance Maxi – Single of the Year	Won
2001	"Solo Me Importas Tu"	Latin Dance/Club Play Track of the Year	Won
2002	"Hero – Remixes"	Latin Dance/Club Play Track of the Year	Won
2003	Quizás	Latin Pop Album of the Year, Male	Nominated
2003	Enrique Iglesias	Latin Tour of the Year	Nominated
2003	Enrique Iglesias	Hot Latin Tracks Artist of the Year	Nominated
2003	"Escape"	Latin Dance Club Play Track of the Year	Won
2005	"No Es Amor (Remixes)"	Latin Dance Club Play Track of the Year	Won
2008	Enrique Iglesias	Artist of the Year	Nominated
2008	Enrique Iglesias	Hot Latin Songs Artist of the Year	Nominated
2008	"Dimelo"	Hot Latin Song of the Year	Nominated
2008	"Dimelo"	Latin Pop Airplay Song of the Year	Nominated
2008	"Do You Know?"	Latin Dance Club Play Track of the Year	Nominated
2009	Enrique Iglesias	Hot Latin Songs Artist of the Year	Won
2009	Enrique Iglesias	Top Latin Albums Artist of the Year	Nominated
2009	Enrique Iglesias	Latin Digital Download Artist of the Year	Nominated
2009	95/08 Éxitos	Album of the Year	Won
2009	95/08 Éxitos	Latin Greatest Hits Album of The Year	Won
2009	95/08 Éxitos	Top Latin Album of the Year, Male	Won
2009	95/08 Éxitos	Latin Pop Album of the Year, Solo	Won
2009	"¿Dónde Están Corazón?"	Hot Latin Song of the Year	Nominated
2009	"¿Dónde Están Corazón?"	Hot Latin Song of the Year, Male	Nominated
2009	"¿Dónde Están Corazón?"	Latin Pop Airplay Song of the Year, Male	Won
2010	"Gracias a Ti" (ft. Wisin & Yandel)	Hot Latin Song of the Year, Vocal Event	Nominated
2010	Enrique Iglesias	Latin Pop Airplay Artist of the Year, Male	Nominated
2011	Enrique Iglesias	Artist of the Year	Won
2011	Enrique Iglesias	Hot Latin Songs Artist of the Year, Male	Won
2011	Enrique Iglesias	Top Latin Albums Artist of the Year, Male	Won
2011	Enrique Iglesias	Latin Pop Airplay Artist of the Year, Solo	Nominated
2011	Enrique Iglesias	Latin Pop Albums Artist of the Year, Solo	Won
2011	Enrique Iglesias	Latin Social Artist of the Year	Nominated
2011	Euphoria	Album of The Year	Won
2011	Euphoria	Latin Pop Album of the Year	Won
2011	Euphoria	Latin Digital Album of the Year	Nominated
2011	"I Like It" (ft. Pitbull)	Hot Latin Song of the Year, Vocal Event	Nominated
2011	"Cuando Me Enamoro" (ft. Juan Luis Guerra)	Hot Latin Song of the Year, Vocal Event	Won
2011	"Cuando Me Enamoro" (ft. Juan Luis Guerra)	Hot Latin Song of the Year	Won
2011	"Cuando Me Enamoro" (ft. Juan Luis Guerra)	Tropical Airplay Song of the Year	Nominated
2011	"Cuando Me Enamoro" (ft. Juan Luis Guerra)	Latin Pop Airplay Song of the Year	Won
2012	Enrique Iglesias	Hot Latin Songs Artist of the Year, Male	Nominated
2012	Enrique Iglesias	Latin Pop Airplay Artist of the Year, Solo	Nominated
2012	Enrique Iglesias	Latin Pop Albums Artist of the Year, Solo	Nominated
2012	Enrique Iglesias	Latin Social Artist of the Year	Nominated
2012	Enrique Iglesias	Latin Touring Artist of the Year	Won
2012	"Euphoria"	Latin Pop Album of the Year	Nominated
2013	Enrique Iglesias & Jennifer Lopez Tour	Tour of the Year	Won
2013	Enrique Iglesias	Latin Pop Songs Artist of the Year, Male	Nominated
2014	Enrique Iglesias	Latin Social Artist of the Year	Nominated
2014	"Loco" (ft. Romeo Santos)	Hot Latin Song of the Year	Nominated
2014	"Loco" (ft. Romeo Santos)	Hot Latin Song of the Year, Vocal Event	Won
2014	"Loco" (ft. Romeo Santos)	Hot Latin Airplay Song of the Year	Nominated
2014	"Loco" (ft. Romeo Santos)	Hot Latin Pop Song of the Year	Nominated
2014	"Loco" (ft. Romeo Santos)	Streaming Song of the Year	Nominated
2014	"Loco" (ft. Romeo Santos)	Tropical Song of the Year	Nominated
2015	Enrique Iglesias	Artist of the Year	Nominated
2015	Enrique Iglesias	Social Artist of the Year	Nominated
2015	Enrique Iglesias	Hot Latin Songs Artist of the Year, Male	Nominated
2015	Enrique Iglesias	Latin Pop Songs Artist of the Year, Solo	Won
2015	Enrique Iglesias	Top Latin Albums Artist of the Year, Male	Nominated
2015	Enrique Iglesias	Latin Pop Albums Artist of the Year, Solo	Won
2015	El Perdedor (ft. Marco Antonio Solís)	Hot Latin Song of the Year, Vocal Event	Nominated
2015	El Perdedor (ft. Marco Antonio Solís)	Digital Song of the Year	Nominated
2015	El Perdedor (ft. Marco Antonio Solís)	Streaming Song of the Year	Nominated
2015	El Perdedor (ft. Marco Antonio Solís)	Latin Pop Song of the Year	Nominated
2015	Sex and Love	Top Latin Album of the Year	Nominated
2015	Sex and Love	Latin Pop Album of the Year	Won
2015	Sex and Love Tour (ft. Pitbull)	Tour of the Year	Nominated
2015	"Bailando" (ft. Descemer Bueno & Gente de Zona)	Hot Latin Song of the Year	Won
2015	"Bailando" (ft. Descemer Bueno & Gente de Zona)	Hot Latin Song of the Year, Vocal Event	Won
2015	"Bailando" (ft. Descemer Bueno & Gente de Zona)	Latin Pop Song of the Year	Won
2015	"Bailando" (ft. Descemer Bueno & Gente de Zona)	Airplay Song of the Year	Won
2015	"Bailando" (ft. Descemer Bueno & Gente de Zona)	Digital Song of the Year	Won
2015	"Bailando" (ft. Descemer Bueno & Gente de Zona)	Streaming Song of the Year	Won
2016	Enrique Iglesias	Artist of the Year	Nominated
2016	Enrique Iglesias	Social Artist of the Year	Nominated
2016	Enrique Iglesias	Hot Latin Songs Artist of the Year, Male	Nominated
2016	Enrique Iglesias	Latin Pop Songs Artist of the Year, Solo	Won
2016	Sex and Love Tour (ft. Pitbull)	Tour of the Year	Nominated
2016	El Perdón (ft. Nicky Jam)	Hot Latin Song of the Year	Won
2016	El Perdón (ft. Nicky Jam)	Hot Latin Song of the Year, Vocal Event	Won
2016	El Perdón (ft. Nicky Jam)	Airplay Song of the Year	Won
2016	El Perdón (ft. Nicky Jam)	Digital Song of the Year	Won
2016	El Perdón (ft. Nicky Jam)	Streaming Song of the Year	Won
2016	El Perdón (ft. Nicky Jam)	Latin Rhythm Song of the Year	Won
2018	Enrique Iglesias	Latin Pop Artist of the Year, Solo	Nominated
2018	Enrique Iglesias & Pitbull	Tour of the Year	Won
2018	“Subeme La Radio” Feat. (ft. Descemer Bueno, Zion & Lennox)	Latin Pop Song of the Year	Nominated
2019	Enrique Iglesias	Latin Pop Artist of the Year, Solo	Nominated
2019	“El Baño” (ft. Bad Bunny)	Latin Pop Song of the Year	Nominated
2020	Enrique Iglesias	Top Latin Artist Of All-Time	Won
2021	Enrique Iglesias	Latin Pop Artist of the Year	Nominated
2022	Enrique Iglesias	Latin Pop Artist of the Year	Won
2022	Final (Vol. 1)	Latin Pop Album of the Year	Nominated
2022	Enrique Iglesias and Ricky Martin Live in Concert	Tour of the Year	Nominated
2023	Enrique Iglesias	Latin Pop Artist of the Year	Nominated

== Blockbuster Entertainment Awards ==
Year	Nominee / work	Award	Result
2000	Enrique Iglesias	Favorite Latino Artist	Won
2000	"Bailamos"	Favorite Song From A Movie from (Wild Wild West)	Nominated
2001	Enrique Iglesias	Favorite Pop Artist – Male	Nominated

== BMI Awards ==
Broadcast Music, Inc. (BMI) is one of three United States performing rights organizations, along with ASCAP and SESAC. It collects license fees on behalf of songwriters, composers, and music publishers and distributes them as royalties to those members whose works have been performed.

=== BMI Latin Awards ===
Year	Nominee / work	Award	Result	Ref.
2003	"Escapar"	Winning Songs	Won	
2004	"Para Qué la Vida"	Winning Songs	Won	
2004	"Quizás"	Winning Songs	Won	
2009	"Dimelo?"	Winning Songs	Won	
2010	"Alguién Soy Yo"	Award Winning Songs	Won	
2012	"I Like It"(ft. Pitbull)	Latin Songwriter of the Year	Won	
2012	"I Like It"(ft. Pitbull)	Award Winning Songs	Won	
2012	"No Me Digas Que No"(ft. Wisin & Yandel)	Latin Songwriter of the Year	Won	
2012	"No Me Digas Que No"(ft. Wisin & Yandel)	Latin Publisher of the Year	Won	
2012	"No Me Digas Que No"(ft. Wisin & Yandel)	Award Winning Songs	Won	

=== BMI Pop Awards ===
Year	Nominee / work	Award	Result	Ref.
2003	"Escape"	Winning Songs	Won	

== BRIT Awards ==
Year	Nominee / work	Award	Result
2003	Enrique Iglesias	Best Pop Act	Nominated

== Bulgaria's Fan TV Award ==
Year	Nominee / work	Award	Result
2007	Enrique Iglesias	International Male Artist of the Year	Won

== CCTV-MTV Music Honors ==
Year	Nominee / work	Award	Result
2000	Enrique Iglesias	International Male Artist of the Year	Won

== Canadian Fannie Awards ==
Year	Nominee / work	Award	Result
Enrique Iglesias	Enrique Iglesias	Favorite Male Artist	Nominated
Enrique Iglesias	"Hero"	Favorite Video	Nominated

== Comet Awards ==
Year	Nominee / work	Award	Result
Enrique Iglesias	"Hero"	Best Male Video	Won

== ECHO Awards ==
Year	Nominee / work	Award	Result
2001	Enrique Iglesias	Best International Male Artist	Nominated
2003	Enrique Iglesias	Best International Male Artist	Nominated

== Ev.gerard Video Music Awards ==
Year	Nominee / work	Award	Result
Enrique Iglesias	"Dirty Dancer" (ft. Usher & Lil Wayne)	Best Male Video	Won
Enrique Iglesias	"Tonight (I'm Lovin' You)" (ft. Ludacris & DJ Frank E)	Best Latin Video	Nominated

== The Record of the Year Award ==
Year	Nominee / work	Award	Result
2002	"Hero"	Record of the Year	Nominated

== Grammy Awards ==
The Grammy Awards are awarded annually by the National Academy of Recording Arts and Sciences in the United States.

Year	Nominee / work	Award	Result	Ref.
1997	Enrique Iglesias	Best Latin Pop Performance	Won	
1998	Vivir	Best Latin Pop Performance	Nominated	
1999	Cosas del Amor	Best Latin Pop Performance	Nominated	
2001	"Be with You"	Best Dance Recording	Nominated	

== Latin Grammy Awards ==
The Latin Grammy Awards are awarded annually in the United States since 2000 for outstanding contributions to Spanish language music.

Year	Nominee / work	Award	Result	Ref.
2003	Quizás	Best Male Pop Vocal Album	Won	
2010	"Cuando Me Enamoro" (feat Juan Luis Guerra)	Song of the Year	Nominated	
2011	Euphoria	Album of the Year	Nominated	
2014	"Bailando" (feat Descemer Bueno and Gente de Zona)	Record of the Year	Nominated	
2014	"Bailando" (feat Descemer Bueno and Gente de Zona)	Song of the Year	Won	
2014	"Bailando" (feat Descemer Bueno and Gente de Zona)	Best Urban Performance	Won	
2014	"Bailando" (feat Descemer Bueno and Gente de Zona)	Best Urban Song	Won	
2014	"Loco" (feat Romeo Santos)	Best Tropical Song	Nominated	
2015	"El Perdón" (feat Nicky Jam)	Best Urban Performance	Won	
2016	"Duele el Corazón" (feat Wisin)	Record of the Year	Nominated	
2016	"Duele el Corazón" (feat Wisin)	Song of the Year	Nominated	

== Latin Music Italian Awards ==
Year	Nominee / work	Award	Result
2014	Enrique Iglesias	Orugullo Latino of the Year	Won
2014	Enrique Iglesias	Artist Saga	Nominated
2014	Enrique Iglesias	Best Fandom	Nominated
2014	Enrique Iglesias	Best Latin Male Artist of the Year	Nominated
2014	"Bailando" (ft. Descemer Bueno & Gente de Zona)	Best Latin Song of the Year	Nominated
2014	"Bailando" (ft. Descemer Bueno & Gente de Zona)	Best Latin Male Video of the Year	Won
2014	"Bailando" (ft. Descemer Bueno & Gente de Zona)	Best Latin Collaboration of the Year	Nominated
2014	"Bailando" (ft. Descemer Bueno & Gente de Zona)	My Favourite Lyrics	Won
2014	"I'm a Freak" (ft. Pitbull)	Best Latin Dance of the Year	Won
2014	"Sex + Love"	Best Latin Album of the Year	Nominated
2015	Enrique Iglesias	Best Latin Male Artist of the Year	Nominated
2015	Enrique Iglesias	Best Latin Fandom	Nominated
2015	"El Perdon" (ft. Nicky Jam)	Best Latin Song of The Year	Nominated
2015	"El Perdon" (ft. Nicky Jam)	Best Latin Male Video of The Year	Won
2015	"El Perdon" (ft. Nicky Jam)	Best Latin Collaboration of The Year	Nominated
2015	"El Perdon" (ft. Nicky Jam)	MyFavorite Lyrics	Won
2015	"Noche Y De Dia" (ft. Yandel & Juan Magan)	Best Latin Song of the Year	Nominated
2015	"Noche Y De Dia" (ft. Yandel & Juan Magan)	Best Latin Male Video of the Year	Nominated
2015	"Noche Y De Dia" (ft. Yandel & Juan Magan)	Best Latin Dance of the Year	Won
2017	Enrique Iglesias	Best Latin Concert in Italy of The Year	Nominated
2017	"Subeme La Radio" (ft. Descemer Bueno, Zion & Lennox)	Best Latin Song of The Year	Nominated

== Lunas del Auditorio ==
Year	Nominee / work	Award	Result	Ref.
2008	Enrique Iglesias	Best Spanish Pop	Nominated	
2009	Enrique Iglesias	Best Spanish Pop	Nominated	
2011	Enrique Iglesias	Best Spanish Pop	Nominated	
2012	Enrique Iglesias	Best Spanish Pop	Nominated	
2014	Enrique Iglesias	Best Spanish Pop	Nominated	
2015	Enrique Iglesias	Best Spanish Pop	Nominated	

== iHeartRadio Music Awards ==
Year	Nominee / work	Award	Result
2017	Himself	Latin Artist of the Year	Nominated
2017	"Duele El Corazon" (ft. Wisin)	Latin Song of the Year	Won

== International Dance Music Awards ==
Year	Nominee / work	Award	Result
2002	"Hero"	Best Latin Track	Won
2011	"I Like It" (ft. Pitbull)	Best Latin/Reggaeton Track	Nominated
2013	"Turn the Night Up"	Best Latin/Reggaeton Track	Nominated

== Ivor Novello Awards ==
Year	Nominee / work	Award	Result
2003	"Hero"	Best Selling UK Single	Nominated

== Much Music Video Awards ==
Year	Nominee / work	Award	Result
2000	"Be With You"	People's Choice: Favourite International Video	Nominated

== Premio Lo Nuestro ==
Year	Nominee / work	Award	Result
1996	Enrique Iglesias	Pop Best New Artist	Won
1996	Enrique Iglesias	Pop Male Artist	Nominated
1996	"Si Tú Te Vas"	Pop Song of the Year	Won
1996	Enrique Iglesias	Pop Album of the Year	Won
1996	"Experiencia Religiosa"	Video of the Year	Nominated
1997	Vivir	Pop Album of the Year	Won
1997	"Experiencia Religiosa"	Pop Song of the Year	Won
1997	"Por Amarte"	Pop Song of the Year	Nominated
1997	Enrique Iglesias	Pop Male Artist	Won
1998	Enrique Iglesias	Pop Male Artist	Nominated
1999	Cosas del Amor	Pop Album of the Year	Nominated
1999	Enrique Iglesias	Pop Male Artist	Nominated
1999	"Esperanza"	Video of the Year	Won
2000	Bailamos	Pop Album of the Year	Nominated
2000	"Bailamos"	Pop Song of the Year	Nominated
2002	"Hero"	Video of the Year	Won
2003	Enrique Iglesias	Pop Male Artist of the Year	Nominated
2003	Enrique Iglesias	People's Internet Award	Nominated
2003	Quizás	Album of the Year	Nominated
2003	"Mentiroso"	Video of the Year	Nominated
2008	Enrique Iglesias	Pop Male Artist of the Year	Nominated
2008	Dimelo?"	Pop Song of the Year	Nominated
2008	Dimelo?"	Video of The Year	Nominated
2009	"95/08 Éxitos"	Pop Album of the Year	Won
2009	¿Dónde Están Corazón?	Pop Song of the Year	Won
2009	Enrique Iglesias	Pop Male Artist of the Year	Nominated
2010	Enrique Iglesias	Pop Male Artist of the Year	Nominated
2011	Enrique Iglesias	Pop Male Artist of the Year	Won
2011	Euphoria	Pop Album of the Year	Nominated
2011	"Gracias a Ti" (with Wisin & Yandel)	Collaboration of the Year	Nominated
2011	"Cuando Me Enamoro" (ft. Juan Luis Guerra)	Collaboration of the Year	Won
2011	"Cuando Me Enamoro" (ft. Juan Luis Guerra)	Pop Song of the Year	Nominated
2012	Enrique Iglesias	Pop Male Artist of the Year	Won
2015	Enrique Iglesias	Artist of the Year	Nominated
2015	Enrique Iglesias	Pop Male Artist of the Year	Won
2015	"Loco" (ft. Romeo Santos)	Tropical Song of the Year	Nominated
2015	"Loco" (ft. Romeo Santos)	Tropical Collaboration of the Year	Won
2015	"Bailando" (ft. Descemer Bueno and Gente de Zona)	Pop Song of the Year	Won
2015	"Bailando" (ft. Descemer Bueno and Gente de Zona)	Pop Collaboration of the Year	Won
2015	"Bailando" (ft. Descemer Bueno and Gente de Zona)	Video of the Year	Won
2015	"Sex & Love"	Pop Album of the Year	Won
2015	"El Perdedor" (ft. Marco Antonio Solís)	Pop Song of the Year	Nominated
2015	"El Perdedor" (ft. Marco Antonio Solís)	Pop Collaboration of the Year	Nominated
2016	Enrique Iglesias	Artist of the Year	Nominated
2016	Enrique Iglesias	Pop Male Artist of the Year	Won
2016	"El Perdón"(with Nicky Jam]	Collaboration of the Year	Won
2016	"El Perdón"(with Nicky Jam]	Urban Song of the Year	Won
2017	Enrique Iglesias	Artist of the Year	Nominated
2017	Enrique Iglesias	Male Artist of the Year	Won
2017	Enrique Iglesias	Pop Male Artist of the Year	Nominated
2017	"Duele El Corazón" (with Wisin)	Collaboration of the Year	Won
2017	"Duele El Corazón" (with Wisin)	Single of the Year	Nominated
2017	"Duele El Corazón" (with Wisin)	Pop Song of the Year	Nominated
2019	"El Baño (Remix)" (with Bad Bunny and Natti Natasha)	Remix of the Year	Nominated
2019	"El Baño (Remix)" (with Bad Bunny and Natti Natasha)	Urban Song of the Year	Nominated
2019	"El Baño (Remix)" (with Bad Bunny and Natti Natasha)	Urban Collaboration of the Year	Nominated
2019	"Por Amarte"	Replay Song of the Year	Won
2019	"Nos Fuimos Lejos" (with Descemer Bueno and El Micha)	Pop/Rock Collaboration of the Year	Nominated

== Premios Eres ==
Year	Nominee / work	Award	Result
1996	"Si Tú Te Vas"	Best Song	Won
1996	"Si Tú Te Vas"	Best Video	Won
1996	Enrique Iglesias	Best Launch	Won

== Premios Juventud ==
Year	Nominee / work	Award	Result
2004	Cosas del Amor	CD To Die For	Nominated
2004	Enrique Iglesias	He's Got Style	Nominated
2004	Enrique Iglesias	He's So Hot!	Nominated
2004	Enrique Iglesias	All Over the Dial	Nominated
2008	Enrique Iglesias	Red Hot Artist	Nominated
2008	Enrique Iglesias	My Favorite Concert with Aventura	Won
2008	Enrique Iglesias	Favorite Pop Star	Nominated
2008	Enrique Iglesias	What a Hottie!	Nominated
2009	Enrique Iglesias	Favorite Pop Artist	Nominated
2009	"Lloro Por Ti" (ft. Wisin & Yandel)	The Perfect Combo	Nominated
2009	"¿Dónde Están Corazón?"	Best Ballad	Nominated
2011	Enrique Iglesias	My Pop Artist	Nominated
2011	"Cuando Me Enamoro" (ft. Juan Luis Guerra)	The Perfect Combo	Won
2011	"I Like It" (ft. Pitbull)	The Perfect Combo	Nominated
2011	"No Me Digas Que No" (ft. Wisin & Yandel)	The Perfect Combo	Nominated
2011	Euphoria	Just Play It All	Nominated
2011	Euphoria	The Super Tour	Nominated
2012	Euphoria	The Super Tour	Won
2012	"Cuando Me Enamoro]" (ft. Juan Luis Guerra)	Best Novela Theme	Nominated
2012	Enrique Iglesias	My Pop Artist	Nominated
2014	Enrique Iglesias	Special Award: Supernova	Won
2014	Enrique Iglesias	Favourite Hispanic Pop/Rock Artist	Won
2014	"El Perdedor" (ft.Marco Antonio Solís)	Best Theme Novelero	Won
2014	"El Perdedor" (ft.Marco Antonio Solís)	Best Ballad	Won
2014	"El Perdedor" (ft.Marco Antonio Solís)	The Perfect Combo	Won
2014	"Loco" (ft. Romeo Santos)	The Perfect Combo	Nominated
2014	"Bailando" (ft. Gente de Zona & Descemer Bueno)	My Favourite Lyrics	Won
2015	"Bailando" (ft. Gente de Zona & Descemer Bueno)	My Favourite Catchiest Song	Won
2015	"Bailando" (ft. Gente de Zona & Descemer Bueno)	My Favourite Music Video	Won
2015	"Bailando" (ft. Gente de Zona & Descemer Bueno)	My Favourite Ringtone	Won
2015	"Bailando" (ft. Gente de Zona & Descemer Bueno)	The Perfect Combo	Won
2015	"El Perdón" (with Nicky Jam)	The Perfect Combo	Nominated
2015	"El Perdón" (with Nicky Jam)	My Favourite Catchiest Tune	Nominated
2015	"Sex + Love"	Your Favourite CD	Nominated
2015	Sex & Love Tour	The Super Tour	Won
2015	Enrique Iglesias	My Pop Artist	Won
2016	Enrique Iglesias	Mi Tuitero Favorito	Nominated

== Premios Tu Mundo ==
Year	Nominee / work	Award	Result
2014	"Bailando"	Start – Party Song	Won
2014	Enrique Iglesias	Favourite Pop Artist	Won
2015	Enrique Iglesias	Favourite Pop Artist	Won
2015	"El Perdón" (ft. Nicky Jam)	Start – Party Song	Won
2016	"Duele el Corazón" (ft. Wisin)	Start – Party Song	Nominated

== National Music Awards ==
Year	Nominee / work	Award	Result
2002	Escape	Favorite Album	Won

== Juno Awards ==
Year	Nominee / work	Award	Result
2001	Enrique	International Album of the Year	Nominated
2003	Escape	International Album of the Year	Nominated

== Meteor Music Awards ==
Year	Nominee / work	Award	Result
2002	Enrique Iglesias	Best Male Artist	Nominated

== MTV Awards ==
=== MTV Asia Awards (Asia) ===
Year	Nominee / work	Award	Result
2003	Enrique Iglesias	Favorite International Male Artist	Nominated
2005	Enrique Iglesias	Favorite International Male Artist	Nominated

=== MTV Europe Music Awards ===
Year	Nominee / work	Award	Result
2000	Enrique Iglesias	Best Spanish Act	Nominated
2002	"Hero"	Best Song	Nominated
2002	Enrique Iglesias	Best Male	Nominated
2002	Enrique Iglesias	Best Pop	Nominated
2002	Enrique Iglesias	Best Spanish Act	Nominated
2010	Enrique Iglesias	Best Spanish Act	Won
2010	Enrique Iglesias	Best Male Artist	Nominated
2010	Enrique Iglesias	Best European Act	Nominated
2011	Enrique Iglesias	Best World Stage Performance	Nominated
2014	Enrique Iglesias	Best World Stage Performance	Won
2014	Enrique Iglesias	Best Southern European Act	Nominated
2014	Enrique Iglesias	Best Spanish Act	Won

=== MTV India Awards ===
Year	Nominee / work	Award	Result
2004	Enrique Iglesias	Best Male Pop Act International	Won

=== Los Premios MTV Latinoamérica ===
Year	Nominee / work	Award	Result
2002	"Héroe"	Video of the Year	Won
2002	Enrique Iglesias	Best Male Artist	Nominated
2002	Enrique Iglesias	Best Pop Artist	Nominated
2007	Enrique Iglesias	MTV Tr3́s Viewer's Choice – Best Pop Artist	Nominated
2007	"Dímelo"	Song of the Year	Nominated

=== MTV Video Music Awards ===
Year	Nominee / work	Award	Result
2002	"Hero"	Best Male Video	Nominated
2002	"Hero"	Viewer's Choice	Nominated
2002	"Héroe"	International Viewer's Choice – MTV Latin America (North)	Nominated
2002	"Héroe"	International Viewer's Choice – MTV Latin America (Pacific)	Nominated
2002	"Escapar"	International Viewer's Choice – MTV Latin America (Atlantic)	Nominated
2010	"I Like It" (Jersey Shore version) (ft. Pitbull)	Best Dance Music Video	Nominated
2011	"Tonight (I'm Lovin' You)" (ft. Ludacris & DJ Frank E)	Best Latino Artist	Nominated

== Music Television Awards ==
Year	Nominee / work	Award	Result	Ref.
2002	Enrique Iglesias	Best Male	Won	
2002	"Hero"	Best Song	Nominated	

== My VH1 Music Awards ==
The My VH1 Music Awards was an annual music award ceremony held by American television network VH1 held in both 2000 and 2001.

Year	Nominee / work	Award	Result	Ref.
2000	Himself	Man of the Year	Nominated	
2000	"Be With You"	Sexxxiest Video	Nominated	
2001	Himself	My Favorite Male	Nominated	
2001	"Hero"	Is It Hot in Here or Is It Just My Video	Nominated	

== NRJ Music Awards ==
Year	Nominee / work	Award	Result
2009	Enrique Iglesias	International Male Artist of the Year	Won
2009	Enrique Iglesias	Group/Duo French Troupe of the Year (with Nâdiya)	Nominated
2009	Tired of Being Sorry (Laisse le destin l'emporter)	French Song of the Year (with Nâdiya)	Nominated
2011	Enrique Iglesias	International Male Artist of the Year	Nominated
2012	Enrique Iglesias	International Male Artist of the Year	Nominated
2015	Enrique Iglesias	International Male Artist of the Year	Nominated
2015	Enrique Iglesias	International Duo/Group of the Year (with Nicky Jam)	Nominated
2016	Enrique Iglesias	International Male Artist of the Year	Nominated
2016	Enrique Iglesias	International Duo/Group of the Year (with Pitbull)	Nominated
2016	Duele el Corazón	International Song of the Year (with Wisin)	Nominated
2016	Enrique Iglesias	Award of Honor	Won

== Radio Music Awards ==
Year	Nominee / work	Award	Result
1997	Enrique Iglesias	Best Artist Contemporary Format	Won

== People's Choice Awards ==
Year	Nominee / work	Award	Result
2011	Enrique Iglesias	Favorite Male Artist	Nominated
2012	Enrique Iglesias	Favorite Male Artist	Nominated

== Pollstar Awards ==
Year	Nominee / work	Award	Result	Ref.
2018	Enrique Iglesias	Latin Tour of the Year	Won	
2021	Enrique Iglesias	Latin Touring Artist of the Decade	Nominated	
2022	Enrique Iglesias and Ricky Martin Live in Concert	Best Latin Tour	Won	

== Teen Choice Awards ==
Year	Nominee / work	Award	Result
2000	Enrique Iglesias	Choice Music : Breakout Artist/Group	Nominated
2000	"Be With You"	Choice Music : Song of the Summer	Nominated
2002	"Hero"	Choice Music: Love Song	Nominated
2002	Enrique Iglesias	Choice Music: Male Artist	Nominated
2010	"I Like It" (ft. Pitbull)	Choice Music: Hook Up	Nominated
2011	Enrique Iglesias	Choice Music : Male Artist	Nominated

== Premio Orgullasamente ==
Year	Nominee / work	Award	Result
2009	Enrique Iglesias	Latin Artist of the Year	Nominated
2009	"Lloro Por Ti" (ft. Wisin & Yandel)	Latin Song of the Year	Nominated
2009	"Lloro Por Ti" (ft. Wisin & Yandel)	Latin Video of the Year	Nominated
2010	Enrique Iglesias	Latin Artist of the Year	Won
2010	"Cuando Me Enamoro" (ft. Juan Luis Guerra)	Latin Song of the Year	Nominated
2010	"Cuando Me Enamoro" (ft. Juan Luis Guerra)	Latin Video of the Year	Won

== Premios 40 Principales ==
=== Premios 40 Principales España ===
Year	Nominee / work	Award	Result
2010	Enrique Iglesias	Best Spanish Solo Act	Nominated
2011	"Tonight (I'm Lovin' You)" (ft. Ludacris and DJ Frank E)	Best Spanish Dance-Pop Project	Nominated
2011	"Tonight (I'm Lovin' You)" (ft. Ludacris and DJ Frank E)	Best Song	Nominated
2011	"Tonight (I'm Lovin' You)" (ft. Ludacris and DJ Frank E)	Best Spanish video	Won
2011	Enrique Iglesias	Best Spanish Act	Nominated
2011	Enrique Iglesias	Most Influential Spanish Artist (Special award)	Won
2014	Enrique Iglesias	Best Spanish Act	Nominated
2014	"Bailando" (ft. Descemer Bueno & Gente de Zona)	Best Spanish Song	Nominated
2014	"Bailando" (ft. Descemer Bueno & Gente de Zona)	Best Spanish Video	Won
2014	"Sex + Love"	Best Spanish Album	Won
2015	Enrique Iglesias	Best Spanish Act	Nominated
2016	Enrique Iglesias	Artist of the Year	Nominated
2016	"Duele el Corazón" (ft. Wisin)	Song of the Year	Nominated
2016	"Duele el Corazón" (ft. Wisin)	Video of the Year	Nominated
2016	"Duele el Corazón" (ft. Wisin)	Global Show Award	Nominated

=== Premios 40 Principales América ===
Year	Nominee / work	Award	Result
2014	Enrique Iglesias	Best Spanish Language Act	Nominated
2014	"Sex + Love"	Best Spanish Language Album	Won
2014	"Bailando" (ft. Descemer Bueno & Gente de Zona)	Best Spanish Language Song	Won

== Neox Fan Awards ==
Year	Nominee / work	Award	Result
2014	"Bailando"	Best song of the year	Nominated

== Urban Music Award ==
Year	Nominee / work	Award	Result
2009	Enrique Iglesias	Best International Latino Act	Won

== Ritmo Latino Music Awards ==
Year	Nominee / work	Award	Result
1999	Cosas del Amor"	Album of the Year	Nominated
1999	"Esperanza"	Song of the Year	Won
1999	"Enrique Iglesias"	Best Male Artist	Nominated
2001	"Enrique Iglesias"	Best Male Artist	Nominated
2001	"Enrique"	Album of the Year	Nominated
2002	"Escape"	Music Video of the Year	Nominated

== TMF Awards ==
Year	Nominee / work	Award	Result
2007	"Do You Know?"	Best International Video	Won

== Radio Regenbogen Awards ==
Year	Nominee / work	Award	Result
2007	Enrique Iglesias	Best International Artist	Won

== Los Premios Telehit Awards ==
Year	Nominee / work	Award	Result
2008	Enrique Iglesias	Pop Artist of the Year	Won
2010	95/08 Éxitos	International Album of the Year	Won
2011	Enrique Iglesias	Pop Artist of the Year	Won
2012	Enrique Iglesias	Pop Artist of the Year	Won

== Premios Fuse TV Awards ==
Year	Nominee / work	Award	Result
2011	"Ayer"	Best Male Video	Nominated

== Premio Ondas ==
Year	Nominee / work	Award	Result	Ref.
2002	Enrique Iglesias	Most Successful Spanish Artist of the Decade	Won	

== Premios Oye! ==
Year	Nominee / work	Award	Result
2010	"Cuando Me Enamoro" (ft. Juan Luis Guerra)	Spanish Record of the Year	Nominated
2010	"Cuando Me Enamoro" (ft. Juan Luis Guerra)	Spanish Theme of the Year	Won
2010	Euphoria	Best Pop Male Album	Nominated

== Top of the Pops Awards ==
Year	Nominee / work	Award	Result
2002	"Hero"	Top Song	Nominated
2002	One Night Stand – World Tour	Top Tour	Nominated

== Univision's Best of Music ==
Year	Nominee / work	Award	Result
2011	Euphoria	Best Disc	Won
2011	Euphoria Tour	Best Tour	Nominated
2011	"No Me Digas Que No" (ft. Wisin & Yandel)	Best Song	Nominated
2011	"Tonight (I'm Lovin' You" (ft. Ludacris and DJ Frank E)	Best Video	Won

== Valentine's Day Awards ==
Year	Nominee / work	Award	Result
2012	Enrique Iglesias	Most Desirable Man	Won
2012	"Love To See You Cry"	Best Love Song of the Year	Won

== VH1/Vogue Fashion Awards ==
Year	Nominee / work	Award	Result	Ref.
2000	Enrique Iglesias	Most Fashionable Artist – Male	Won	

== Viña Del Mar International Song Festival ==
Year	Nominee / work	Award	Result
2000	Enrique Iglesias	Gaviota De Plata	Won

== World Music Awards ==
Year	Nominee / work	Award	Result
1996	Enrique Iglesias	Hispanic Artist of the Year	Won
1996	Enrique Iglesias	Revelacion of the Year	Won
2002	Enrique Iglesias	Best Seling Pop Male Artist	Won
2002	Enrique Iglesias	Best Selling European Artist	Won
2002	Enrique Iglesias	Best Selling Latin Male Artist	Won
2008	Enrique Iglesias	Best Pop/Rock Male Artist	Nominated
2008	Enrique Iglesias	Best Selling Latin Performer	Won
2008	Enrique Iglesias	Best Selling Spanish Artist	Won
2012	Enrique Iglesias	Best Male Artist	Won
2012	Enrique Iglesias	Best Entertainer of the Year	Won
2012	"Finally Found You"	Best Song	Won
2014	"Heart Attack"	World's Best Song	Nominated

== Billboard Decade-End ==
Year	Charted Work	Decade-End Chart	Rank
1999	Enrique Iglesias	Latin Artist of the Decade	(#4)
2009	Enrique Iglesias	Artist of the Decade	(#74)
2009	Enrique Iglesias	Latin Artist of the Decade	(#7)
2009	Enrique Iglesias	Hot 100 Songs Artist	(#70)
2009	Enrique Iglesias	Hot Dance/Club Play Songs Artist	(#6)
2009	Enrique Iglesias	Latin Pop Songs Artist	(#3)
2009	Enrique Iglesias	Latin Pop Albums Artist	(#9)
2009	Escape	Billboard 200 Album	(#108)
2009	95/08 Éxitos	Top Latin Albums	(#33)
2009	95/08 Éxitos	Top Latin Pop Albums	(#16)
2009	Quizás	Top Latin Albums	(#52)
2009	The Best Hits	Top Latin Albums	(#91)
2009	"Hero"	Top Adult Contemporary Song	(#5)
2009	"Escape"	Top Dance/Club Play Songs	(#42)
2009	"Lloro Por Tí"	Top Latin Songs	(#13
2009	"Lloro Por Tí"	Top Latin Pop Songs	(#5)
2009	"¿Dónde Están Corazón?"	Top Latin Pop Songs	(#12)
2009	"¿Dónde Están Corazón?"	Top Latin Songs	(#23)
2009	"Dimelo?"	Top Latin Songs	(#35)
2009	"Dimelo?"	Top Latin Pop Songs	(#16)
2009	Alguien Soy Yo"	Top Latin Pop Songs	(#46)

== Billboard legacy ==
- Artist of The Year Chart in: 2000, 2001, 2002, 2010, 2011, 2014.
- Billboard 200 Albums Of The Year Charts in: 1999, 2000, 2001, 2002, 2010, 2014
- Billboard Hot 100 Songs Of The Year Charts in: 1999, 2000, 2001, 2002, 2007, 2010, 2011, 2012, 2014, 2015

== Other recognition ==
- Para Todos : King of Latin Pop
- Para Todos : King of Dance
- Appeared on more than 300 magazine covers
- Holds the record for male artist with the most No. 1 Songs on the "Billboard Dance Charts", edging out Michael Jackson as the "King of Dance"
- Biggest selling international artist of all time in India
- United kingdom's biggest selling Latin artist of all time
- Enrique is the artist with most No. 1 hits on the "Hot Latin Songs Chart"
- Enrique is the first ever artist in the industry whose Latin video (BAILANDO) Churned Out over 1 Billion + views
- ENRIQUE IGLESIAS Was named the "King of 2014" .
- ENRIQUE Was named the "Crowd Pleaser of 2014" by "Billboard" due to his success with the 10th studio album and huge hit "Bailando"
- Enrique has 36 Latin Billboard awards which is the most for any artist.
- Bailando was the tenth best selling song in the world of 2014 with 8M sold worldwide
- "Sex And Love" was Spotify's 7th most listened to album worldwide of 2014
- Enrique's Pepsi commercial with P!nk, Britney Spears, and Beyoncé was named the No. 1 Super Bowl commercial of all time
- Enrique's first Spanish album, "Enrique Iglesias", sold 1M copies in the US after three months and won a Grammy
- Enrique is an honorary recipient of one "Guinness World Records", Namely,
- He's the artist who has most number one singles on "Hot Latin Songs" Billboard Chart dated since – 1995 to 2015 .
