= 7 (Enrique Iglesias album) =

Studio album by Enrique Iglesias
- Released: 25 November 2003
- Genre: Pop
- Length: 53:40
- Label: Interscope
- Producers: Gregg Alexander; Tony Bruno; Rob Davis; Fernando Garibay; Enrique Iglesias; Mark Taylor; Steve Morales

Enrique Iglesias chronology
Quizás (2002)	7 (2003)	Insomniac (2007)

Singles from 7
- 1. "Addicted" Released: 13 October 2003; 2. "Not in Love" Released: 7 February 2004

7 is the third English-language and seventh overall studio album by Spanish singer Enrique Iglesias. It was released on 25 November 2003 in the United States. Following the massive success of his 2001 release Escape, which cemented his status as one of the most prominent and best-selling Latin artists in the global music industry, Iglesias took his sound further into the rock-pop direction he had established with 7. He co-wrote and co-produced every track on the project.

The album received mixed reviews, with critics comparing it negatively with his 2001 album saying it did not live up to the expectations that Escape had created. Commercially, the album failed to match the success of its predecessors. None of its singles cracked the Billboard Hot 100, though lead single "Addicted" peaked at number 11 on the UK Singles Chart and second and final single "Not in Love" was a moderated hit in Europe. After this album, Enrique took a three-year break from music business.

== Background ==
In 2001, Iglesias released Escape, his fifth studio and second English-language album, with Interscope Records. Commercially, the album proved to be even more successful than its predecessor, Enrique (1999), selling over 8 million copies worldwide, whil spawning a series of hit singles, including the number-one hit "Hero." For his next English-language project with the label, Iglesias aimed to further develop and expand upon the rock-pop sound established on Escape. The singer co-produced and co-wrote each track on the set. with Jimmy Iovine serving as the album's executive producer alongside Iglesias. Iglesias told the Toronto Sun that he took special care with the songwriting on the album. "I concentrated a lot on the lyrical content of this album and just tried to be as honest as possible. I wanted to write songs that I won't feel silly singing 10 years from now."

== Promotion ==
"Addicted" was released as the album's lead single on 14 October 2003. Iglesias claimed he wrote the song while on tour in East Germany, on a dismal day, when he was inspired by the gothic Architecture. It was a modest hit on the UK Singles Chart, where it charted within the top twenty, though it failed to chart on the Billboard Hot 100. The Spanish version, titled "Adicto", peaked inside the top ten on the Hot Latin Tracks Chart.

"Not in Love" was released as the album's second and last single on 7 February 2004. The song was written by Iglesias, Paul Barry, Mark Taylor and Fernando Garibay. The album version features Iglesias's vocals only, however, the radio and single mix features an extra verse and chorus performed by Kelis. It peaked at number five on the UK Singles Chart, however, again failed to make the Billboard Hot 100.

== Critical reception ==
Professional ratings
Review scores
Source	Rating
AllMusic	4/5 stars
Blender	3/5 stars
Entertainment Weekly	D
The Guardian	1/5 stars
Los Angeles Times	1.5/4 stars
MTV Asia	4/10
New York Post	2.5/4 stars
The News & Observer	1.5/5 stars
Now	2/5 Ns
Pensacola News Journal	1.5/5 stars

AllMusic editor John Bush rated the album four out of five stars and called 7 a "solid pop album from an artist with someone to seduce, if not something to say [...] Given arrangements with teeth, Iglesias responds with a set of solid performances, ones that suit his audience but also offer something to listeners who aren't immediately captivated by the faraway look in his eyes on the cover." Billboard felt that with 7 "Iglesias again delivers catchy hooks and radio-friendly ballads. The question is, will airwaves still embrace him? What would have been an album filled with top 10 hits a few years ago may, unfortunately, fall flat these days. Such tunes as "California Calling," "Break Me Shake Me" and "Free" are reminiscent of previous singles. So, perhaps his lucky streak will continue."

Caroline Sullivan from The Guardian described the album as a "drudgesome old mix of arena rock and Our Tune weepies." She called 7 an "insipid record. If you buy into the idea of sonny-boy as sex god, you'll be in a lather over the innuendo-laden ballad "Addicted," which appears in four different versions. If not, don't bother, unless you've got a soft spot for the drive-time "rock" that fills in the gaps around the ballads." Similarly, Entertainment Weekly's Michael Endelman wrote: "On his third English-language album, Iglesias abandons frothy Latin pop for glossy arena rock, and it proves to be disastrous. There's nothing here that's as undeniably anthemic as the prom-night favorite "Hero," from 2001's Escape. And his breathy, overly emotive vocals are better suited to disco fluff and ballads than to crunchy rockers, leaving listeners with an awkward disc stocked with cliched lyrics and generic melodies." Los Angeles Times critic felt that "unfortunately, this derivative pastiche of that era's rock, new wave and folk-pop, spiced with modern electronic-dance flavors, is about as imaginative as the album title," while Now's Elizabeth Bromstein found that 7 was "just flat, overproduced pop with dim lyrics like "It's the way you touch me baybay." It's just got no punch."

== Commercial performance ==
Although still a commercial success, 7 was considerably less successful than Iglesias' previous English-language albums Enrique (1999) and Escape (2001). In the United States, the album opened and peaked number 31 on the US Billboard 200. By April 2007, it has sold 394,000 copies in the United States, according to Nielsen SoundScan. Elsewhere, 7 reached the top 20 in Australia, Portugal, Switzerland, and the United Kingdom. It was eventually certified Platinum in Australia and Canada, and reached Gold status in Russia, Switzerland, and the United Kingdom.

== Track listing ==
7 — North American standard version
No.	Title	Writer(s)	Producer(s)	Length
1.	"Not in Love"	Enrique Iglesias; Paul Barry; Mark Taylor; Fernando Garibay	Taylor; Iglesias^{[a]}; Garibay^{[a]}	3:42
2.	"The Way You Touch Me"	Iglesias; Alex Ander; Rob Davis	Alexander; Davis; Iglesias	3:51
3.	"Say It"	Iglesias; Ander; Davis	Alexander; Davis; Iglesias	4:21
4.	"California Callin'"	Iglesias; Barry; Taylor	Taylor	3:49
5.	"Addicted"	Iglesias; Barry; Taylor	Taylor	5:00
6.	"Break Me Shake Me"	Iglesias; Ander; Davis	Alexander; Davis; Iglesias	3:39
7.	"Free"	Iglesias; Barry	Taylor	3:35
8.	"Be Yourself"	Iglesias; Barry	Taylor	4:38
9.	"Wish You Were Here (With Me)"	Iglesias; Barry; Taylor	Taylor	4:15
10.	"You Rock Me"	Iglesias; Barry; Taylor	Taylor	3:45
11.	"Roamer" (featuring Kara DioGuardi)	Iglesias; Tony Bruno; Kara DioGuardi	Steve Morales; Bruno	3:54
12.	"Live It Up Tonight"	Iglesias; Ander; Davis	Alexander; Davis; Iglesias	4:11
13.	"Adicto" (bonus track)	Iglesias; Barry; Taylor	Taylor	5:00

7 — North American digital version (bonus track)
No.	Title	Writer(s)	Producer(s)	Length
14.	"Not in Love" (featuring Kelis) (radio mix)	Iglesias; Barry; Taylor; Garibay; Kelis Rogers	Taylor; Iglesias^{[a]}; Garibay^{[a]}	3:42

7 — International version (bonus tracks)
No.	Title	Writer(s)	Producer(s)	Length
14.	"Addicted" (Metro mix)	Iglesias; Barry; Taylor	Taylor^{[b]}; Jeff Taylor^{[b]}	3:29
15.	"Addicted" (Glam As You mix)	Iglesias; Barry; Taylor	Guena LG^{[b]}; RLS^{[b]}	6:16

7 — European Special Edition (bonus tracks)
No.	Title	Writer(s)	Producer(s)	Length
14.	"Addicted" (Metro mix)	Iglesias; Barry; Taylor	Taylor^{[b]}; Taylor^{[b]}	3:29
15.	"Addicted" (Fernando Garibay edit)	Iglesias; Barry; Taylor	Garibay^{[b]}	4:23
16.	"Be with You"	Iglesias; Barry; Taylor	Taylor; Brian Rawling	3:40

7 — Japanese version (bonus tracks)
No.	Title	Writer(s)	Producer(s)	Length
14.	"Addicted" (Metro mix)	Iglesias; Barry; Taylor	Taylor^{[b]}; Taylor^{[b]}	3:30
15.	"Addicted" (Glam As You mix)	Iglesias; Barry; Taylor	Guena LG^{[b]}; RLS^{[b]}	6:18
16.	"Hero" (Live from One and Only)	Iglesias; Barry; Taylor	Taylor	4:38

Notes

- ^{^[a]} signifies a co-producer
- ^{^[b]} signifies a remixer
- On physical releases, "California Callin'" duration is mistakenly printed as 4:49

== Charts ==
=== Weekly charts ===
Weekly chart performance for 7
Chart (2003–2004)	Peak position
Australian Albums (ARIA)	15
Austrian Albums (Ö3 Austria)	48
Belgian Albums (Ultratop Flanders)	70
Dutch Albums (Album Top 100)	44
French Albums (SNEP)	142
German Albums (Offizielle Top 100)	27
Irish Albums (IRMA)	52
Portuguese Albums (AFP)	20
Scottish Albums (Official Charts)	15
South African Albums (RISA)	2
Swedish Albums (Sverigetopplistan)	49
Swiss Albums (Schweizer Hitparade)	11
UK Albums (Official Charts)	13
US Billboard 200	31

=== Year-end charts ===
2003 year-end chart performance for 7
Chart (2003)	Position
UK Albums (OCC)	111

2004 year-end chart performance for 7
Chart (2004)	Position
Australian Albums (ARIA)	88
UK Albums (OCC)	195

== Certifications and sales ==
Certifications for 7
Region	Certification	Certified units/sales
Australia (ARIA)	Platinum	70,000^{^}
Canada (Music Canada)	Platinum	100,000^{^}
Russia (NFPF)	Gold	10,000^{*}
Switzerland (IFPI Switzerland)	Gold	20,000^{^}
United Kingdom (BPI)	Gold	100,000^{^}
United States	—	394,000
^{*} Sales figures based on certification alone.^{^} Shipments figures based on certification alone.

== Australian tour ==
Date	City	Country	Venue
Australian leg
March 12, 2004	Brisbane	Australia	Brisbane Entertainment Center
March 14, 2004	Sydney	Australia	Sydney Entertainment Centre
March 15, 2004	Sydney	Australia	Sydney Entertainment Centre
March 18, 2004	Melbourne	Australia	Rod Laver Arena
March 19, 2004	Melbourne	Australia	Rod Laver Arena
March 23, 2004	Adelaide	Australia	Adelaide Entertainment Centre
March 26, 2005	Perth	Australia	Perth Entertainment Centre
