= Sad Eyes (Bruce Springsteen song) =

1999 single by Bruce Springsteen

Single by Bruce Springsteen

from the album Tracks
- B-side: "I Wanna Be with You"
- Released: June 8, 1999
- Recorded: January 25, 1990
- Studio: Soundworks West, Los Angeles
- Genre: Rock
- Length: 3:47
- Label: Columbia
- Songwriter: Bruce Springsteen
- Producers: Bruce Springsteen, Chuck Plotkin, Jon Landau, Roy Bittan

Bruce Springsteen singles chronology
"Spare Parts" (1988)	"Sad Eyes" (1999)	"The Rising" (2002)

"Sad Eyes" is a song written and performed by Bruce Springsteen, recorded at Soundworks West in Los Angeles on January 25, 1990. The song was released as a single on the 1998 box set Tracks, as well as its 1999 single-disc version 18 Tracks.

== Track listing ==
CD single (B00004UU3I)

1. "Sad Eyes"
2. "Missing"
3. "Man at the Top"
4. "Take 'Em as They Come"

== Personnel ==
- Bruce Springsteen – lead vocals, guitar
- Randy Jackson – bass
- David Sancious – keyboards
- Jeff Porcaro – drums

== Charts ==
Weekly chart performance for "Sad Eyes"
Chart (1999)	Peak
Italy (FIMI)	12
Sweden (Sverigetopplistan)	54

== Enrique Iglesias version ==
"Sad Eyes"

Single by Enrique Iglesias

from the album Enrique
- Released: August 29, 2000
- Length: 4:08
- Label: Interscope
- Songwriter: Bruce Springsteen
- Producer: Lester Mendez

Enrique Iglesias singles chronology
"Could I Have This Kiss Forever" (2000)	"Sad Eyes" (2000)	"Hero" (2001)

Spanish singer-songwriter Enrique Iglesias recorded a version of "Sad Eyes" and included it on his first English language release, titled Enrique. While recording the album, Interscope chairman Jimmy Iovine, who had previously worked with Springsteen, found out that Iglesias was a fan of his (Iglesias often cites the Born in the U.S.A. tour as a favorite concert experience and Springsteen as his favorite performer) and urged him to record "Sad Eyes". The song was released as the fifth and final single from the album. The album version was not released to radio but rather the HQ2 remix which gave the song a more pop sound. Iglesias did not promote the song and it was not as successful as the previous singles from the album. However, the collected remixes charted high on the club play charts. A Spanish version of the song was also recorded titled "Más es amar".

=== Music video ===
A music video was shot, directed by David LaChapelle, but it was shelved at the time due to its sexual content. It depicts Iglesias alone in a motel room indulging erotic fantasies about a girl he sees in a phone-sex ad. In 2009, the video was uploaded to LaChappelle's website but was promptly removed at the request of Universal Music; it has since found its way to various video-sharing sites. The music video uses the HQ2 remix as opposed to the album version.

=== Track listings ===
Australia

1. "Sad Eyes" (album version) – 4:08
2. "Sad Eyes" (Rodney Jerkins mix) – 4:01
3. "Sad Eyes" (Guy Roche mix) – 3:44
4. "Sad Eyes" (HQ2 radio remix) – 3:34

America

1. "Sad Eyes" (album version) – 4:08
2. "Sad Eyes" (Rodney Jerkins Darkchild mix) – 4:01
3. "Sad Eyes" (HQ2 club mix) – 9:29

=== Charts ===
Weekly chart performance for "Sad Eyes"
Chart (2000)	Peak position
Australia (ARIA)	104
Canada Top Singles (RPM)	36
Belgium (Ultratip Bubbling Under Flanders)	12
Belgium (Ultratip Bubbling Under Wallonia)	8
Poland (Polish Airplay Charts)	1
Switzerland (Schweizer Hitparade)	43
Sweden (Sverigetopplistan)	48
US Bubbling Under Hot 100 (Billboard)	23
US Dance Club Songs (Billboard)	8
US Pop Airplay (Billboard)	34

=== Release history ===
Release dates and formats for "Sad Eyes"
Region	Date	Format	Label	Ref(s).
United States	August 29, 2000	Contemporary hit radio	Interscope	
United States	September 12, 2000	Rhythmic contemporary radio	Interscope	
