= La Chica de Ayer =

Song by Antonio Vega

"Chica de Ayer" (Eng.: Yesterday Girl) is a pop song written by Antonio Vega and recorded by Spanish rock band Nacha Pop in 1980, which was included on their album Nacha Pop.

== Popular culture ==
The title of the song was used as the name of the Spanish television series La Chica de Ayer which was based on the British detective show Life on Mars, which was similarly named after a David Bowie song. The same title is also used as the name of a contemporary poetry book, written by Solange De-Ré (Imaginante Editorial).

== Enrique Iglesias version ==
"La Chica de Ayer"

Song by Enrique Iglesias

from the album Quizás
- Released: July 2002 (Spain)
- Recorded: 2002
- Genre: Latin pop
- Length: 3:58
- Label: Universal Music Latino
- Songwriter: Antonio Vega
- Producers: Rafael Pérez-Botija; Lester Mendez; Enrique Iglesias

Spanish singer-songwriter Enrique Iglesias recorded a version of "La Chica de Ayer" for his album Quizás in 2002. The song was released as promotional single from his album Quizas in Spain and topped the airplay charts in that country.
