= List of number-one singles of 1999 (Spain) =

This is a list of the Spanish PROMUSICAE Top 20 Singles number-ones of 1999.

== Chart history ==
Issue date	Song	Artist
2 January	"What's Your Sign?"	Des'ree
9 January	"Believe"	Cher
16 January	"What's Your Sign?"	Des'ree
23 January	"Believe"	Cher
30 January	"Big Big World"	Emilia
6 February	"Big Big World"	Emilia
13 February	"Believe"	Cher
20 February	"Maria"	Blondie
27 February	"You Gotta Be"	Des'ree
6 March	"You Gotta Be"	Des'ree
13 March	"Nothing Really Matters"	Madonna
20 March	"Nothing Really Matters"	Madonna
27 March	"Nothing Really Matters"	Madonna
3 April	"Promises"	The Cranberries
10 April	"It's Not Right but It's Okay"	Whitney Houston
17 April	"Maria"	Blondie
24 April	"Salomé"	Chayanne
1 May	"Salomé"	Chayanne
8 May	"I Want It That Way"	Backstreet Boys
15 May	"I Want It That Way"	Backstreet Boys
22 May	"I Want It That Way"	Backstreet Boys
29 May	"Bailamos"	Enrique Iglesias
5 June	"Bailamos"	Enrique Iglesias
12 June	"Bailamos"	Enrique Iglesias
19 June	"Bailamos"	Enrique Iglesias
26 June	"DJ"	Dover
3 July	"Mambo No.5"	Lou Bega
10 July	"Mambo No.5"	Lou Bega
17 July	"Mambo No.5"	Lou Bega
24 July	"Mambo No.5"	Lou Bega
31 July	"Mambo No.5"	Lou Bega
7 August	"Mambo No.5"	Lou Bega
14 August	"Mambo No.5"	Lou Bega
21 August	"Mambo No.5"	Lou Bega
28 August	"Mambo No.5"	Lou Bega
4 September	"Mambo No.5"	Lou Bega
11 September	"Mambo No.5"	Lou Bega
18 September	"Mambo No.5"	Lou Bega
25 September	"Bailamos"	Enrique Iglesias
2 October	"El Extranjero"	Bunbury
9 October	"El Extranjero"	Bunbury
16 October	"Genie in a Bottle"	Christina Aguilera
23 October	"Genie in a Bottle"	Christina Aguilera
30 October	"Genie in a Bottle"	Christina Aguilera
6 November	"Genie in a Bottle"	Christina Aguilera
13 November	"Genie in a Bottle"	Christina Aguilera
20 November	"Genie in a Bottle"	Christina Aguilera
27 November	"Rhythm Divine"	Enrique Iglesias
4 December	"Rhythm Divine"	Enrique Iglesias
11 December	"Rhythm Divine"	Enrique Iglesias
18 December	"Rhythm Divine"	Enrique Iglesias
25 December	"Rhythm Divine"	Enrique Iglesias

== See also ==
- 1999 in music
- List of number-one hits (Spain)
