= Addicted (Enrique Iglesias song) =

2003 single by Enrique Iglesias

Single by Enrique Iglesias

from the album 7
- B-side: "One Night Stand" (remix); "Adicto"
- Released: 13 October 2003
- Length: 5:00 (album version); 4:11 (radio edit); 4:41 (video version)
- Label: Interscope
- Songwriters: Enrique Iglesias; Paul Barry; Mark Taylor
- Producer: Mark Taylor

Enrique Iglesias singles chronology
"Para Qué la Vida" (2003)	"Addicted" (2003)	"Not in Love" (2004)

Music video
- "Addicted" on YouTube

Music video
- "Addicted" (UK version) on YouTube

"Addicted" is a song by Spanish singer Enrique Iglesias. It was the first single released from his seventh studio album, 7. It was a modest hit in the UK, where it charted within the top 20, though it failed to chart on the US Billboard Hot 100. The Spanish version, titled "Adicto", peaked inside the top 10 of the Billboard Hot Latin Tracks chart and is included on several formats of the single release.

== Music video ==
The music video was directed by Peter Berg through Mars Media and cinematographed by Tobias Schliessler. It features actress Mischa Barton as Iglesias's love interest. In a radio interview with KIIS-FM Iglesias claimed that the idea for the video was inspired by the movie Midnight Express. In the video, Iglesias is depicted as a jail prisoner who receives limited visitations with restricted contact from Barton, implying he is addicted to her, and cannot have as much of her as he wants. At the end of the video it is realized that there is no prison, and he simply is addicted to her. Two versions of the music video have been released, one US version and one UK version, using different shots during the fight scene (3:15–3:25).

== Track listings ==
European CD single

1. "Addicted" (radio edit)
2. "One Night Stand" (Boogieman remix)

UK CD1

1. "Addicted" (radio edit)
2. "Hero"
3. "Adicto" (radio edit)
4. "Addicted" (video)

UK CD2

1. "Addicted" (radio edit)
2. "One Night Stand" (Boogieman remix)
3. "Addicted" (The Scumfrog remix)

Australian and Japanese CD single

1. "Addicted" (radio edit)
2. "One Night Stand" (Boogieman remix)
3. "Hero" (live from One and Only)
4. "Adicto"

== Charts ==
Weekly chart performance for "Addicted"
Chart (2003–2004)	Peak position
Australia (ARIA)	43
Austria (Ö3 Austria Top 40)	51
Belgium (Ultratip Bubbling Under Flanders)	5
CIS Airplay (TopHit)	158
Denmark (Tracklisten)	9
Germany (GfK)	31
Ireland (IRMA)	31
Netherlands (Single Top 100)	50
Russia Airplay (TopHit)	104
Scottish Singles Sales (Official Charts)	8
Sweden (Sverigetopplistan)	26
Switzerland (Schweizer Hitparade)	34
Ukraine Airplay (TopHit)	161
UK Singles (Official Charts)	11
US Bubbling Under Hot 100 (Billboard)	1
US Dance Club Songs (Billboard) Remixes	4
US Pop Airplay (Billboard)	27

Weekly chart performance for "Adicto"
Chart (2004)	Peak position
US Hot Latin Songs (Billboard)	9
US Latin Pop Airplay (Billboard)	5
US Tropical Airplay (Billboard)	22

== Release history ==
Release dates and formats for "Addicted"
Region	Date	Format(s)	Label(s)	Ref.
United States	13 October 2003	Contemporary hit radio	Interscope	
United Kingdom	17 November 2003	CD; cassette	Interscope	
Japan	21 November 2003	CD	Interscope	
Australia	24 November 2003	CD	Interscope	
