= Could I Have This Kiss Forever =

2000 single by Whitney Houston and Enrique Iglesias

Single by Whitney Houston and Enrique Iglesias

from the album Enrique and Whitney: The Greatest Hits
- B-side: "If I Told You That"
- Released: May 15, 2000
- Studio: Chartmaker (Los Angeles); Sound Studio N (Cologne); Sony (Los Angeles)
- Genre: Latin pop; R&B
- Length: 3:55
- Label: Arista
- Songwriter: Diane Warren
- Producers: David Foster; Mark Taylor; Brian Rawling

Whitney Houston singles chronology
"Same Script, Different Cast" (2000)	"Could I Have This Kiss Forever" (2000)	"If I Told You That" (2000)

Enrique Iglesias singles chronology
"Be with You" (2000)	"Could I Have This Kiss Forever" (2000)	"Sad Eyes" (2000)

Music video
- "Could I Have This Kiss Forever" on YouTube

"Could I Have This Kiss Forever" is a mid-tempo duet performed by American singer Whitney Houston and Spanish singer Enrique Iglesias. It was written by Diane Warren and produced by David Foster, Mark Taylor and Brian Rawling. The song first appeared on Iglesias's debut English-language album Enrique (1999) as a slow Latin-styled ballad. A re-recorded and remixed version of the song was later included on Houston's first compilation album, Whitney: The Greatest Hits (2000) and served as its lead single.

The song received mixed critical reception, with praise for its sensual Latin-influenced production and vocal chemistry, while some criticized its sentimentality and Iglesias' vocal delivery. Commercially, "Could I Have This Kiss Forever" was a major international success, reaching number one in several European countries and the Eurochart Hot 100, while also attaining top-ten positions in numerous other markets and earning gold or platinum certifications in several countries.

== Background and release ==
"It was with Whitney Houston [on 1999's "Could I Have This Kiss Forever"]. I was so young and extremely nervous, but she made it so easy. She was so sweet, caring and loving. I remember that first hug. It was very genuine."

— Enrique Iglesias talking about what was his most special collaboration in his career.

"Could I Have This Kiss Forever" was written by Diane Warren and initially produced by David Foster for Iglesias' English-language debut album, Enrique (1999). The song was not originally conceived as a duet. According to Iglesias, he and Clive Davis discussed the song after Iglesias had heard and responded favorably to its demo. Davis subsequently suggested recording it as a duet with Whitney Houston: In an interview with Entertainment Weekly, Iglesias recalled: "Clive Davis and I were talking about this song that I'd heard a demo of and loved. And he says, "Why don't you do it with Whitney?" So we did, and it turned out fantastic." Iglesias also noted that Davis had been supportive of the collaboration despite Iglesias not being signed to Davis' label, Arista Records.

Although the song became a duet, Houston and Iglesias initially recorded their vocals separately. Houston recorded her part in Hamburg, Germany, while Iglesias recorded his vocals in Los Angeles, California. This meant that the two singers did not meet during the recording of the original album version. They eventually met in the studio when the song was re-recorded and remixed by Mark Taylor and Brian Rawling from British production duo Metro for its subsequent single release. The new version adopted a more pronounced mid-tempo dance-pop arrangement and was released as the lead single from Houston's compilation album Whitney: The Greatest Hits in 2000.

== Critical reception ==
Critical reception of "Could I Have This Kiss Forever" was mixed, with some critics praising its romantic atmosphere, Latin-influenced production, and the vocal interplay between Houston and Iglesias, while others criticized its sentimental tone and vocal performances. Billboard viewed the pairing of Houston, an established pop and R&B star, with Iglesias, then a rising Latin-pop artist, as initially unexpected but ultimately effective, praising the song's mid-tempo arrangement, Spanish guitar instrumentation, and sensual atmosphere. The magazine particularly noted Iglesias' relaxed and sensual delivery and Houston's restrained performance, which it felt suited the song's romantic character. Michael R. Smith of The Daily Vault similarly praised the duet, arguing that Houston's presence brought out a stronger vocal performance from Iglesias. Elysa Gardner of Vibedescribed the track as "sinuous" and "Latin-flavored", while also arguing that Houston ultimately overshadowed her duet partner.

Other reviews were considerably less favorable. J. D. Considine of The Baltimore Sun felt that Houston appeared to be competing with Iglesias vocally, while LA Weekly criticized Iglesias' delivery as lacking the intended sensuality. Christine Galera of The Orlando Sentinel regarded the duet as a conventional Iglesias-style single and was unimpressed by Houston's contribution. Jim Farber of the New York Daily News interpreted the song as a cynical attempt to capitalize on the Latin crossover trend that was prominent in mainstream pop music at the time. NME gave the song a particularly negative assessment, criticizing its Latin-tinged arrangement, sentimental lyrics, and romantic clichés, Digital Spy later singled it out as one of the weakest of Iglesias' collaborations. In 2012, however, "Could I Have This Kiss Forever" was placed first on Idolator's list of "Whitney Houston's 10 Best Songs That Radio Forgot" because "this slow-burning mid-tempo number brims over with a sexy vibe, thanks to the singer's duet partner Enrique Iglesias and an understated-but-effective remix by then-hot production team Metro."

== Chart performance ==
Commercially, "Could I Have This Kiss Forever" was a major international success, particularly in Europe. The song reached number one in Croatia, the Netherlands and Switzerland, and topped the Eurochart Hot 100, giving Houston her fifth and final number-one single on the pan-European chart. It also hit the top ten in many other countries, and attained gold status in Australia, Germany, and Switzerland. In Finland, it peaked at number 17. In Iceland, it peaked at number two and also in Sweden, where the song spent 19 weeks on the chart. It was certified platinum by the Swedish Recording Industry Association. In Ireland, it peaked at number eight and spent seven weeks on the chart. In Austria, it peaked at number eight and spent 20 weeks on the chart. In Ireland, it debuted and peaked at number 8. In the United Kingdom, it peaked at number seven, becoming Houston's 16th top-ten single, and had sold approximately 140,000 copies by 2012.

In North America, the song achieved more moderate chart success. It peaked at number 52 on the US Billboard Hot 100, where it spent 19 cumulative weeks, while reaching number 10 on the Billboard Adult Contemporary Singles chart and number 34 on the Mainstream Top 40, becoming Houston's 24th top-ten hit on the former. In Canada, it performed more strongly, reaching number eight on the singles chart and number two on the Adult Contemporary chart. "Could I Have This Kiss Forever" also received gold certifications in Australia, Belgium, France, Germany, New Zealand and Switzerland, in addition to its platinum certification in Sweden.

== Music video ==
The video for "Could I Have This Kiss Forever" was directed by Francis Lawrence. Entertainment Tonight aired the world premiere of the video on June 22, 2000. Krysten Ritter and a young Dania Ramirez appear as extras in the video. The video was successful upon its release, reaching heavy rotation on both MTV and VH1. It has accumulated 215 million views on YouTube.

== Formats and track listings ==
- Australia CD maxi single
1. "Could I Have This Kiss Forever" (Metro mix) – 3:55
2. "I'm Your Baby Tonight" (Dronez mix) – 5:03
3. "I'm Every Woman" (Clivillés & Cole mix) – 4:31
4. "Queen of the Night" (CJ Mackintosh mix) – 5:19
- Canadian CD maxi single
1. "Could I Have This Kiss Forever" (Metro radio mix) – 3:55
2. "Could I Have This Kiss Forever" (original version) – 4:21
3. "Love Will Save the Day" (Jellybean & David Morales 1987 Classic Underground mix) – 7:30
- European CD single
1. "Could I Have This Kiss Forever" (Metro mix) – 3:55
2. "Could I Have This Kiss Forever" (original version) – 4:21
- European CD maxi single
1. "Could I Have This Kiss Forever" (Metro mix) – 3:55
2. "Could I Have This Kiss Forever" (original version) – 4:21
3. "Could I Have This Kiss Forever" (Tin Tin Out mix) – 4:04
4. "Could I Have This Kiss Forever" (Tin Tin Out mix edit) – 3:38
5. "If I Told You That" (Johnny Douglas mix) – 4:48
6. "I'm Every Woman" (Clivillés & Cole mix) – 4:31
- Europe 12-inch vinyl single

A1: "Could I Have This Kiss Forever" (Metro mix) – 3:55
A2: "Could I Have This Kiss Forever" (Tin Tin Out mix edit) – 3:38
A3: "Could I Have This Kiss Forever" (original version) – 4:21
B1: "Could I Have This Kiss Forever" (Tin Tin Out mix) – 4:02
B2: "If I Told You That" (Johnny Douglas mix) – 4:48

== Charts ==
=== Weekly charts ===
Weekly chart performance for "Could I Have This Kiss Forever"
Chart (2000)	Peak position
Australia (ARIA)	12
Austria (Ö3 Austria Top 40)	8
Belgium (Ultratop 50 Flanders)	8
Belgium (Ultratop 50 Wallonia)	5
Canada Top Singles (RPM)	8
Canada Adult Contemporary (RPM)	2
Croatia International Airplay (HRT)	1
Czech Republic (IFPI)	6
Europe (Eurochart Hot 100)	1
Finland (Suomen virallinen lista)	17
France (SNEP)	16
Germany (Media Control)	5
Iceland (Íslenski Listinn Topp 40)	2
Ireland (IRMA)	8
Italy (FIMI)	6
Netherlands (Dutch Top 40)	1
Netherlands (Single Top 100)	2
New Zealand (Recorded Music NZ)	7
Norway (VG-lista)	7
Poland (PiF PaF)	4
Quebec (ADISQ)	3
Scottish Singles Sales (Official Charts)	9
Spain (AFYVE)	4
Sweden (Sverigetopplistan)	2
Switzerland (Schweizer Hitparade)	1
UK Singles (Official Charts)	7
UK Airplay (Music Week)	23
US Billboard Hot 100	52
US Adult Contemporary (Billboard)	10
US Pop Airplay (Billboard)	34

=== Year-end charts ===
2000 year-end chart performance for "Could I Have This Kiss Forever"
Chart (2000)	Position
Australian (ARIA)	63
Belgium (Ultratop 50 Flanders)	52
Belgium (Ultratop 50 Wallonia)	38
Europe (Eurochart Hot 100)	31
Finland (Suomen virallinen lista)	25
France (SNEP)	70
Germany (Media Control)	43
Ireland (IRMA)	94
Netherlands (Dutch Top 40)	23
Netherlands (Single Top 100)	22
New Zealand (RIANZ)	22
Sweden (Hitlistan)	24
Switzerland (Schweizer Hitparade)	13
UK Singles (OCC)	124
US Adult Contemporary (Billboard)	20

2001 year-end chart performance for "Could I Have This Kiss Forever"
Chart (2001)	Position
Canada (Nielsen SoundScan)	172

== Certifications ==
Certifications for "Could I Have This Kiss Forever"
Region	Certification	Certified units/sales
Australia (ARIA)	Gold	35,000^{^}
Belgium (BRMA)	Gold	25,000^{*}
France (SNEP)	Gold	250,000^{*}
Germany (BVMI)	Gold	250,000^{^}
New Zealand (RMNZ)	Gold	5,000^{*}
Sweden (GLF)	Platinum	30,000^{^}
Switzerland (IFPI Switzerland)	Gold	25,000^{^}
^{*} Sales figures based on certification alone.^{^} Shipments figures based on certification alone.

== Release history ==
Release history and formats for "Could I Have This Kiss Forever"
Region	Date	Format(s)	Label(s)	Ref.
United States	May 15, 2000	Adult contemporary; hot adult contemporary; modern adult contemporary radio	Arista	
United States	May 16, 2000	Rhythmic contemporary; contemporary hit radio	Arista	
Australia	June 19, 2000	CD	Arista	
Sweden	September 11, 2000	CD	Arista	
United Kingdom	October 2, 2000	12-inch vinyl; CD; cassette	Arista	

== See also ==
- List of European number-one hits of 2000
- Dutch Top 40 number-one hits of 2000
- List of number-one hits of 2000 (Switzerland)
- List of UK top 10 singles in 2000
