= List of Dutch Top 40 number-one singles of 2000 =

These hits topped the Dutch Top 40 in 2000 (see 2000 in music).

Issue date	Artist(s)	Song
1 January	Marco Borsato	"Binnen"
8 January	Marco Borsato	"Binnen"
15 January	Marco Borsato	"Binnen"
22 January	Scoop	"Drop It"
29 January	Scoop	"Drop It"
5 February	Scoop	"Drop It"
12 February	Abel	"Onderweg"
19 February	Abel	"Onderweg"
26 February	Abel	"Onderweg"
4 March	Abel	"Onderweg"
11 March	Abel	"Onderweg"
18 March	Abel	"Onderweg"
25 March	Bomfunk MC's	"Freestyler"
1 April	Bomfunk MC's	"Freestyler"
8 April	Bomfunk MC's	"Freestyler"
15 April	Bomfunk MC's	"Freestyler"
22 April	Bomfunk MC's	"Freestyler"
29 April	Melanie C featuring Lisa "Left Eye" Lopes	"Never Be the Same Again"
6 May	Melanie C featuring Lisa "Left Eye" Lopes	"Never Be the Same Again"
13 May	Britney Spears	"Oops!... I Did It Again"
20 May	Britney Spears	"Oops!... I Did It Again"
27 May	Bon Jovi	"It's My Life"
3 June	Bon Jovi	"It's My Life"
10 June	Jop	"Jij bent de zon"
17 June	Jop	"Jij bent de zon"
24 June	Jop	"Jij bent de zon"
1 July	Jop	"Jij bent de zon"
8 July	Jody Bernal	"Que si, que no"
15 July	Jody Bernal	"Que si, que no"
22 July	Jody Bernal	"Que si, que no"
29 July	Jody Bernal	"Que si, que no"
5 August	Jody Bernal	"Que si, que no"
12 August	Krezip	"I Would Stay"
19 August	Krezip	"I Would Stay"
26 August	Krezip	"I Would Stay"
2 September	Melanie C	"I Turn to You"
9 September	Melanie C	"I Turn to You"
16 September	Melanie C	"I Turn to You"
23 September	Melanie C	"I Turn to You"
30 September	Enrique Iglesias and Whitney Houston	"Could I Have This Kiss Forever"
7 October	Jody Bernal	"Que si, que no"
14 October	Jody Bernal	"Que si, que no"
21 October	U2	"Beautiful Day"
28 October	U2	"Beautiful Day"
4 November	Twarres	"Wêr bisto"
11 November	Twarres	"Wêr bisto"
18 November	Twarres	"Wêr bisto"
25 November	Twarres	"Wêr bisto"
2 December	Twarres	"Wêr bisto"
9 December	Twarres	"Wêr bisto"
16 December	LeAnn Rimes	"Can't Fight the Moonlight"
23 December	LeAnn Rimes	"Can't Fight the Moonlight"
30 December	LeAnn Rimes	"Can't Fight the Moonlight"

== See also ==
- 2000 in music
- 2000 in the Netherlands
