= Be with You (Enrique Iglesias song) =

2000 single by Enrique Iglesias

- US CD single cover

Single by Enrique Iglesias

from the album Enrique
- B-side: "Sólo me importas tú"
- Released: 29 February 2000
- Studio: Hyde Park (London, England)
- Genre: Dance-pop; house
- Length: 3:40
- Label: Interscope
- Songwriters: Enrique Iglesias; Paul Barry; Mark Taylor
- Producers: Mark Taylor; Brian Rawling

Enrique Iglesias singles chronology
"Rhythm Divine" (1999)	"Be with You" (2000)	"Could I Have This Kiss Forever" (2000)

Music video
- "Be with You" on YouTube

"Be with You" is a song by Spanish singer-songwriter Enrique Iglesias, released on 29 February 2000 through Interscope Records as the third single from Iglesias's debut English-language studio album, Enrique (1999). It was co-written by Iglesias and produced by Mark Taylor and Brian Rawling, the team responsible for Cher's hit song "Believe". Iglesias once stated that he initially came up with the lyrics of the song while taking a break from recording in London's Hyde Park. He also recorded a Spanish version of the song titled "Sólo me importas tú".

"Be with You" became Iglesias's second number-one single on the US Billboard Hot 100 and received a Grammy nomination for Best Dance Recording in 2001. It was also successful internationally, reaching number four in Spain, number one in the Czech Republic, number two in Canada, and the top 20 in Finland, Germany, Hungary, Italy, New Zealand, and Sweden. It was certified gold in Sweden for shipments of over 15,000. "Be with You" was not released in the United Kingdom due to the underperformance of previous single "Rhythm Divine" there.

== Composition ==
The song is performed in the key of C♯ minor with a tempo of 122 beats per minute. In common time, it follows a chord progression of E–B–C♯m–G♯m in the verses and A–B–C♯m–G♯m in the intro and chorus. Iglesias's vocals span from E_{4} to C♯_{6}.

== Commercial performance ==
In the United States, "Be with You" became Iglesias's second number-one single there after "Bailamos", claiming the top spot for three consecutive weeks. It also topped the Billboard Dance Club Songs chart and also charted in the top 20 in Canada, Finland, Germany, Italy, New Zealand, Spain, and Sweden. The Spanish version of the song ("Sólo me importas tú") reached peaked at number two on the Billboard Hot Latin Tracks chart. In the United Kingdom, the song was not released since the previous single, "Rhythm Divine", stalled at number 45 on the UK Singles Chart in December 1999.

== Music videos ==
The official music video for this single was directed by Dave Meyers and starts out with Iglesias and a bunch of friends (played by Iglesias's real life friends including Gerardo Mejía) stopping at a road side store. While messing around in the store, Iglesias makes eye contact with the shy girl working the counter, his love interest in the video (played by Shannon Elizabeth). When the group leaves the store, Iglesias drives their jeep while the others perform various stunts including car surfing and interacting with young women in another jeep riding beside them.

The group stops at a foot of Vasquez Rocks where Iglesias notices Elizabeth, now wearing more provocative clothes and with a lot more confidence; he follows a girl who takes off her top with her back to him and Iglesias chastises his posse for following him and they then follow her posse to a Nightclub (the now closed Point Night Club in Los Angeles) where Iglesias searches the packed dance floor for his love interest when the music stops and changes to that of the popular Thunderpuss 2000 remix which builds up with shots of break dancers until the music turns back to the album version of the song. Iglesias manage to find Elizabeth who gropes him and leads him out of the club. Outside, the two kiss as fireworks go off. The entire video is intercut with shots of Iglesias singing in front of a tribal background.

The video debuted on MTV's Total Request Live in February 2000. It was Iglesias's first video to make it to number one on the popular chart show. Some airing of the video on MTV cut out the section of the video featuring the Thunderpuss 2000 remix. Music stations such as Much Music and various stations throughout Europe aired a version which featured the full album version of the song.

The Spanish version of the video is exactly the same as the English version, with the exception of Iglesias mouthing the words in Spanish in front of the tribal background and when he interacts with Elizabeth.

== Track listings ==
Spanish and US CD single; US cassette single
No.	Title	Length
1.	"Be with You" (LP version)	3:39
2.	"Sólo me importas tú" (Spanish version)	3:39

European CD single
No.	Title	Length
1.	"Be with You" (album version)	3:39
2.	"Be with You" (Thunderpuss 2000 radio mix)	3:54

South African CD single
No.	Title	Length
1.	"Be with You" (Fernando Garibay's radio edit)	3:36
2.	"Be with You" (Mijango's extended mix)	8:52
3.	"Be with You" (Thunderpuss 2000 12-inch club mix)	8:16
4.	"Be with You" (video)

Australian and Japanese CD single
No.	Title	Length
1.	"Be with You" (album version)	3:39
2.	"Be with You" (Thunderpuss 2000 radio mix)	3:54
3.	"Be with You" (Fernando Garibay's club mix)	7:44
4.	"Rhythm Divine" (video)

US 7-inch single
No.	Title	Length
1.	"Be with You" (A)	3:20
2.	"Sad Eyes" (B)	4:08

US 12-inch single
No.	Title	Length
1.	"Be with You" (A1. Thunderpuss club mix)	8:16
2.	"Be with You" (A2. Thunderdub)	8:16
3.	"Be with You" (B1. Mijangos club mix)	8:52
4.	"Be with You" (B2. Mijangos Recycled dub)	7:16

US CD single ("Sólo me importas tú")
No.	Title	Length
1.	"Sólo me importas tú" ("Be with You")	3:39
2.	"Sólo me importas tú" (Mijango's club mix)	8:54
3.	"Sólo me importas tú" (Fernando's club mix)	7:44
4.	"Sólo me importas tú" (Mijango's radio edit)	4:23
5.	"Sólo me importas tú" (Fernando's radio edit)	3:36

== Charts ==
=== Weekly charts ===
2000 weekly chart performance for "Be with You"
Chart (2000)	Peak position
Australia (ARIA)	36
Austria (Ö3 Austria Top 40)	26
Belgium (Ultratip Bubbling Under Flanders)	3
Belgium (Ultratip Bubbling Under Wallonia)	9
Canada Top Singles (RPM)	2
Canada Adult Contemporary (RPM)	6
Croatia (HRT)	3
Czech Republic (IFPI)	1
Europe (Eurochart Hot 100)	37
Finland (Suomen virallinen lista)	19
France (SNEP)	43
Germany (GfK)	20
Hungary (Mahasz)	3
Iceland (Íslenski Listinn Topp 40)	30
Italy (FIMI)	11
Italy Airplay (Music & Media)	8
Netherlands (Dutch Top 40 Tipparade)	7
Netherlands (Single Top 100)	70
New Zealand (Recorded Music NZ)	12
Portugal (AFP)	6
Spain (Promusicae)	4
Sweden (Sverigetopplistan)	13
Switzerland (Schweizer Hitparade)	21
US Billboard Hot 100	1
US Adult Contemporary (Billboard)	27
US Adult Pop Airplay (Billboard)	28
US Dance Club Songs (Billboard)	1
US Dance Singles Sales (Billboard)	3
US Pop Airplay (Billboard)	6
US Rhythmic Airplay (Billboard)	16

2024 weekly chart performance for "Be with You"
Chart (2024)	Peak position
Poland (Polish Airplay Top 100)	94

Weekly chart performance for "Sólo me importas tú"
Chart (2000)	Peak position
US Hot Latin Songs (Billboard)	2
US Latin Pop Airplay (Billboard)	2
US Tropical Airplay (Billboard)	2

=== Year-end charts ===
Year-end chart performance for "Be with You"
Chart (2000)	Position
Sweden (Hitlistan)	93
US Billboard Hot 100	37
US Adult Top 40 (Billboard)	79
US Dance Club Play (Billboard)	49
US Mainstream Top 40 (Billboard)	27
US Maxi-Singles Sales (Billboard)	14
US Rhythmic Top 40 (Billboard)	55

Year-end chart performance for "Sólo me importas tú"
Chart (2000)	Position
US Hot Latin Tracks (Billboard)	13
US Latin Pop Tracks (Billboard)	11

== Certifications ==
Certifications and sales for "Be with You"
Region	Certification	Certified units/sales
Sweden (GLF)	Gold	15,000^{^}
^{^} Shipments figures based on certification alone.

== Release history ==
Release dates and formats for "Be with You"
Region	Date	Format(s)	Label(s)	Ref.
United States	29 February 2000	Rhythmic contemporary; contemporary hit radio	Interscope	
Japan	29 March 2000	CD	Interscope	

== See also ==
- List of Billboard Hot Dance Music/Club Play number ones of 2000
- Lists of Billboard number-one singles
