= Para Qué la Vida =

Single by Enrique Iglesias

from the album Quizás
- Released: January 6, 2003
- Recorded: February – May 2002
- Studio: Nadir Studios (Madrid, Spain); South Point Studios (Miami Beach, Florida); Larrabee Studios; Westlake Studios; Westlake Audio (Hollywood, California); Compass Point Studios (Nassau, Bahamas); The Hit Factory Critiera (Miami, Florida)
- Genre: Latin pop
- Length: 4:05
- Label: Universal Music Latino
- Songwriters: Léster Méndez; Enrique Iglesias; Cheín García-Alonso
- Producer: Léster Méndez

Enrique Iglesias singles chronology
"Quizás" (2002)	"Para Qué la Vida" (2003)	"Addicted/Adicto" (2003)

Music video
- "Para Que La Vida (She Stays)" on YouTube

"Para Qué la Vida" ("What's the Point of Life") is the third single released internationally by Spanish singer-songwriter Enrique Iglesias from his fourth full-Spanish album Quizás (2002). It was released on 6 January 2003 (see 2003 in music).

== Song information ==
The track was written by Cheín García-Alonso, Léster Méndez and Enrique Iglesias. It became his 16th number-one single in the Billboard Hot Latin Tracks and is notable for being the song that outranked Luis Miguel for most number one singles on Billboard's Hot Latin Tracks. Miguel would tie Iglesias in November 2003 with his 16th (and final) number-one hit, "Te Necesito". With the release of "Para Qué La Vida" Iglesias became the first Latin to be played over 1,000,000 times in the United States radio.

== Chart performance ==
The track debuted on the United States Billboard Hot Latin Tracks chart at number 39 on 29 March 2003, and rose to number 1 nine weeks later, spending one week at the summit. The single spent eighteen weeks in the chart.

Chart (2003)	Peak position
U.S. Billboard Hot Latin Tracks	1
U.S. Billboard Latin Pop Airplay	2
U.S. Billboard Latin Tropical/Salsa Airplay	1
U.S. Billboard Latin Tropical Airplay	1
U.S. Billboard Bubbling Under Hot 100 Singles	1
U.S. Billboard Latin Regional Mexican Airplay	1

== See also ==
- List of number-one Billboard Hot Latin Tracks of 2003
