= Quizás (album) =

2002 studio album by Enrique Iglesias

Studio album by Enrique Iglesias
- Released: September 17, 2002
- Recorded: February - July 2002
- Studios: Nadir Studios (Madrid, Spain); Larrabee Studios; Westlake Studio (Hollywood, California, U.S.); The Hit Factory (Criteria) (Miami, Florida, U.S.); South Point Studios (Miami Beach, Florida, U.S.); Compass Point Studios (Nassau, Bahamas)
- Genres: Latin pop; soft rock; latin ballad
- Length: 45:46
- Label: Universal Music Latino
- Producers: Enrique Iglesias; Léster Méndez; Rafael Pérez-Botija; Andrés Restrepo

Enrique Iglesias chronology
Escape (2001)	Quizás (2002)	7 (2003)

Singles from Quizás
- 1. "Mentiroso" Released: July 22, 2002; 2. "Quizás" Released: November 11, 2002; 3. "Para Qué la Vida" Released: February 3, 2003

Professional ratings
Review scores
Source	Rating
AllMusic	2.5/5 stars

Quizás (English: Perhaps) is the sixth studio album and fourth full-Spanish-language album recorded by the Spanish singer-songwriter Enrique Iglesias. The album witch released by Universal Music Latino on September 17, 2002 (see 2002 in music).

Quizás was Iglesias first album in Spanish in four years, his last being Cosas del Amor in 1998. This was also his last full-length Spanish album of his career as his next albums would be English and bilingual exclusively. The album has a fragile and delicate sound compared to his previous three Spanish albums, which were based on pop songs with light rock instrumentation and consists mainly of middle of the road Latin pop ballads. It is his most personal release to date as it deals with topics such as the strange relationship with his father, singer Julio Iglesias, and other personal dilemmas.

Enrique Iglesias won the Latin Grammy Award for Best Male Pop Vocal Album at the 4th Annual Latin Grammy Awards on 3 September 2003.

== Making of Quizás ==
Enrique Iglesias wrote or co-wrote every track on the album and co-produced several of the tracks with the exception of "Tres Palabras" and the cover version of "La Chica de Ayer" originally recorded by Nacha Pop. Iglesias was the executive producer of the album alongside best friend Andrés Restrepo. The title track of the album talks about Iglesias' strained relationship with his father. The album was released on 17 September 2002.

== Commercial performance ==
Quizas topped the Billboard Latin Albums Chart, debuting at No. 1 and shot to No. 12 on the Billboard 200, the highest position for a Spanish album at the time and fastest-selling Spanish album in five years. All three singles released from the album ("Mentiroso", "Quizás" and "Para Qué La Vida") topped Billboard's Hot Latin Tracks Chart. In Spain however the first single "Mentiroso" was not released. In its place, the song "La Chica de Ayer" was released as promotional single. The album also entered at 200 on the UK album charts, the highest entry for a Spanish album that year as well as performing well across Latin America going platinum in counties like Mexico and Argentina. The album sold over a million copies worldwide by the end of 2002.

== Track listing ==
Quizás — standard version
No.	Title	Writer(s)	Length
1.	"Tres Palabras"	Gerardo "Cachorro" López; Sandra Baylac; Sebastián Schón	4:23
2.	"Para Qué la Vida"	Chein García-Alonso; Léster Méndez; Enrique Iglesias	4:05
3.	"La Chica de Ayer"	Antonio Vega	3:58
4.	"Mentiroso"	Alonso; Iglesias	4:00
5.	"Quizás"	Méndez; Iglesias	4:11
6.	"Pienso en Ti"	Botija; Iglesias	4:19
7.	"Marta"	Botija; Iglesias	4:23
8.	"Suéltame las Riendas"	Alonso; Iglesias	3:55
9.	"Mamacita"	Alonso; Méndez; Iglesias	4:52
10.	"Mentiroso" (versión mariachi)	Alonso; Iglesias	3:51
11.	"No Apagues la Luz" (bonus track)	Iglesias; Morales; DioGuardi; Siegel	3:49
Total length:			45:46

== Charts ==
Chart (2002)	Peak position
Canadian Albums (Nielsen SoundScan)	30
European Top 100 Albums (Music & Media)	32
Portuguese Albums (AFP)	4
Spain (PROMUSICAE)	1
Swedish Albums (Sverigetopplistan)	15
Swiss Albums (Schweizer Hitparade)	41
UK Albums (Official Charts)	148
US Billboard 200	12
US Top Latin Albums (Billboard)	1
US Latin Pop Albums (Billboard)	1

== Certifications and sales ==
Region	Certification	Certified units/sales
Argentina (CAPIF)	Gold	20,000^{^}
Spain (Promusicae)	Platinum	100,000^{^}
United States (RIAA)	Gold	500,000^{^}
^{^} Shipments figures based on certification alone.

== See also ==
- List of best-selling Latin albums
