= Quizás (Enrique Iglesias song) =

Single by Enrique Iglesias

from the album Quizás
- Released: 7 October 2002
- Recorded: February – May 2002
- Studio: Nadir Studios (Madrid, Spain); South Point Studios (Miami Beach, Florida); Larrabee Studios; Westlake Studio; Westlake Audio (Hollywood, California); Compass Point Studios (Nassau, The Bahamas); The Hit Factory Critiera (Miami, Florida)
- Genre: Latin pop
- Length: 4:11
- Label: Universal Music Latino
- Songwriters: Léster Méndez; Enrique Iglesias
- Producer: Léster Méndez

Enrique Iglesias singles chronology
"Mentiroso" (2002)	"Quizás" (2002)	"Para Qué la Vida" (2003)

"Quizás" ("Perhaps") is the second single released internationally by Spanish singer-songwriter Enrique Iglesias from his fourth fully Spanish language album Quizás (2002), It was released on 7 October 2002 (see 2002 in music).

== Song information ==
The track was co-written and produced by Iglesias and Léster Méndez. The song talks about the strained relationship between Iglesias and his father. It became his 15th number-one single in the Billboard Hot Latin Tracks, thus tying him with Luis Miguel who had 15 #1's at the time.

== Chart performance ==
The track debuted on the United States Billboard Hot Latin Tracks chart at number 28 on 30 November 2002, and rose to number 1 twelve weeks later, spending one week at the summit. The single spent 23 weeks in the chart.

Chart (2002/2003)	Peak position
U.S. Billboard Hot Latin Tracks	1
U.S. Billboard Latin Pop Airplay	1
U.S. Billboard Latin Tropical/Salsa Airplay	2
U.S. Billboard Bubbling Under Hot 100 Singles	21

2026 weekly chart performance
Chart (2026)	Peak position
El Salvador Airplay (ASAP EGC)	7

== See also ==
- List of number-one Billboard Hot Latin Tracks of 2003
