= Not in Love (Enrique Iglesias song) =

2004 single by Enrique Iglesias

Single by Enrique Iglesias featuring Kelis

from the album 7
- Released: 2 February 2004
- Length: 3:42 (album version); 3:41 (radio mix featuring Kelis)
- Label: Interscope
- Songwriters: Enrique Iglesias; Paul Barry; Mark Taylor; Fernando Garibay; Sheppard Solomon; Victoria Horn; Kelis Rogers
- Producers: Enrique Iglesias; Mark Taylor

Enrique Iglesias singles chronology
"Addicted" (2003)	"Not in Love" (2004)	"Do You Know? (The Ping Pong Song)" (2007)

Kelis singles chronology
"Milkshake" (2003)	"Not in Love" (2004)	"Trick Me" (2004)

Music video
- "Not in Love" on YouTube

"Not in Love" is a song by Spanish singer Enrique Iglesias. The song was written by Iglesias, Paul Barry, Victoria Horn, Mark Taylor, Sheppard Solomon, and Fernando Garibay for Iglesias' seventh studio album, 7 (2003). The album version features Iglesias's vocals only, with the radio mix featuring an extra verse and chorus by American singer Kelis. "Not in Love" was released as the album's second and final single on 2 February 2004 and peaked within the top 10 of the charts in the Czech Republic, Denmark, Greece, Ireland, the Netherlands, Norway, Romania, and the United Kingdom.

== Music video ==
The music video was directed by Jake Nava and filmed in Los Angeles, California. The video opens with Iglesias and Kelis outside a busy nightclub and Iglesias enters the club first while Kelis waits on a motorbike. Once inside, Iglesias meets up with his gang at the bar and soon makes his way to the stage where he performs the song backed by a live band. Meanwhile, Kelis appears in sequences by herself or tantalizing Iglesias around various areas of the club.

== Track listings ==
UK CD1

1. "Not in Love" (radio mix) – 3:43
2. "Maybe" (Mark Taylor version) – 3:10

UK CD2

1. "Not in Love" (radio mix) – 3:43
2. "Maybe" (Mark Taylor extended mix) – 5:10
3. "Not in Love" (Dave Audé extended mix) – 7:07
4. "Not in Love" (video) – 3:43

US

1. "Not in Love" (radio mix) – 3:43
2. "Not in Love" (Dave Audé vocal edit) – 6:08
3. "Addicted" (The Scumfrog radio edit) – 4:37
4. "Addicted" (Fernando Garibay radio edit) – 3:45

== Personnel ==
Personnel are taken from the European CD single liner notes.

- Written By: Enrique Iglesias, Paul Barry, Mark Taylor, Fernando Garibay, Sheppard Solomon, Victoria Horn (+Kelis Rogers on radio mix)
- Lead vocals: Enrique Iglesias (+Kelis on radio mix)
- Producer: Mark Taylor
- Co-producers: Enrique Iglesias, Fernando Garibay
- Mixed By: Mark Taylor, Ren Swan
- Engineer: Carlos Paucer, Ren Swan, Jason Stasium, Tim Olmstead
- Guitars, Keyboards, Programming: Fernando Garibay
- Additional Guitars: Adam Phillips, Charles Fearing
- Background vocals: Enrique Iglesias, Paul Barry, Steve Lee, Sylvia Mason-James

== Charts ==
=== Weekly charts ===
Chart (2004)	Peak position
Australia (ARIA)	15
Austria (Ö3 Austria Top 40)	36
Belgium (Ultratop 50 Flanders)	16
Belgium (Ultratop 50 Wallonia)	22
CIS Airplay (TopHit) Solo version	59
CIS Airplay (TopHit)	44
Croatia (HRT)	9
Czech Republic (IFPI)	3
Denmark (Tracklisten)	4
Europe (Eurochart Hot 100)	9
France (SNEP)	36
Germany (GfK)	14
Greece (IFPI Greece)	7
Hungary (Rádiós Top 40) Solo version	35
Hungary (Rádiós Top 40)	40
Hungary (Dance Top 40)	27
Ireland (IRMA)	7
Italy (FIMI)	45
Netherlands (Dutch Top 40)	6
Netherlands (Single Top 100)	10
New Zealand (Recorded Music NZ)	36
Norway (VG-lista)	6
Romania (Romanian Top 100)	10
Russia Airplay (TopHit) Solo version	41
Russia Airplay (TopHit)	21
Scottish Singles Sales (Official Charts)	4
Sweden (Sverigetopplistan)	11
Switzerland (Schweizer Hitparade)	14
Ukraine Airplay (TopHit) Solo version	93
UK Singles (Official Charts)	5
US Bubbling Under Hot 100 (Billboard)	18
US Dance Club Songs (Billboard) D. Aude, Minge Binge & R.H. Vission mixes	1
US Hot Latin Songs (Billboard)	37
US Pop Airplay (Billboard)	35

=== Year-end charts ===
Chart (2004)	Position
Australia (ARIA)	64
Belgium (Ultratop 50 Flanders)	67
Germany (Media Control GfK)	94
Netherlands (Dutch Top 40)	29
Netherlands (Single Top 100)	50
Sweden (Hitlistan)	61
Switzerland (Schweizer Hitparade)	59
UK Singles (OCC)	71
US Dance Club Play (Billboard)	3

== Certifications ==
Region	Certification	Certified units/sales
Australia (ARIA)	Gold	35,000^{^}
^{^} Shipments figures based on certification alone.

== Release history ==
Region	Date	Format(s)	Label(s)	Ref.
United States	2 February 2004	Contemporary hit radio	Interscope	
Australia	23 February 2004	CD	Interscope	
United Kingdom	8 March 2004	CD	Interscope	

== See also ==
- Number-one dance hits of 2004 (USA)
