= Para Todos =

US magazine

- Editor: Silvia B. Ichar
- Founded: 1995
- Company: Free Frequency
- Country: USA
- Based in: San Juan Capistrano
- Language: Spanish
- Website: http://www.paratodos.com

Para Todos (Spanish for "For Everyone") is a regional Spanish language magazine in the United States. Published by Silvia Ichar, the magazine reaches Southern California Latinos through its local distribution, as well as subscription base. Para Todos was launched in San Juan Capistrano, California in 1995 as a community magazine for South Orange County, but eventually became a publication with much more content than what was originally intended, and has gone on to be the leading Spanish language regional magazine of Southern California.

The content of the magazine is intended to be for women (79% of its readers are women).

The main headquarters of Para Todos are still in San Juan Capistrano. However, the publication now reaches distribution through Los Angeles.

== Awards ==
Silvia Ichar has won several awards for her work on Para Todos:

- 2000 - Small Business Estrella Award from the Hispanic Chamber of Commerce of Orange County
- 2009 - Small Business Journalist of the Year from the Small Business Administration
- 2010 - Journalist of the Year - Hispanic Public Relations Association
