= Rhythm Divine =

1999 single by Enrique Iglesias

Single by Enrique Iglesias

from the album Enrique
- B-side: "Bailamos" (Eric Morillo main vocal mix)
- Released: 8 October 1999
- Studio: Dreamhouse (London, England)
- Genre: Dance-pop
- Length: 3:30
- Label: Interscope
- Songwriters: Paul Barry; Mark Taylor
- Producers: Taylor; Brian Rawling

Enrique Iglesias singles chronology
"Bailamos" (1999)	"Rhythm Divine" (1999)	"Be with You" (2000)

Music video
- "Rhythm Divine" on YouTube

Music video
- "Ritmo Total (Rhythm Divine)" on YouTube

"Rhythm Divine" is a song by Spanish singer Enrique Iglesias from his fourth studio album, Enrique (1999). The song was written by Paul Barry and Mark Taylor with Taylor and Brian Rawling handling its production. It is a dance-pop rhythmic romantic ballad that mixes with Latin and Mediterranean music. Lyrically, Iglesias asks the listener if they can hear the rhythm, and one music journalist compared it to USA for Africa's "We Are the World" (1985). A Spanish-language translation of the song titled "Ritmo Total" was also recorded and features additional lyrical contributions by Rafael Pérez-Botija.

Upon its release, "Rhythm Divine" was met with positive reactions from music critics, who found it to be catchy and among the album's best tracks. Commercially, it reached number one in the Czech Republic, Romania, and Spain and peaked within the top 10 in Canada, Finland, Hungary, Italy, New Zealand, and Norway, as well as on the Billboard Dance Club Songs in the United States. It was certified gold in New Zealand for sales of 5,000 copies. "Ritmo Total" topped the Billboard Hot Latin Tracks and Latin Pop charts in the US.

Iglesias performed the song live at several concerts hosted by local radio stations in 1999 and 2000 and was subsequently included on the set lists for the Escape Tour (2002), the 7 Tour (2004), the Insomniac Tour (2007–08), the Greatest Hits Tour (2009), the Euphoria Tour (2011–12), and the Enrique Iglesias & Jennifer Lopez Tour (2012). The music video for "Rhythm Divine" was directed by Francis Lawrence and was filmed in Hawaii; Malibu, California; and Chinatown, Los Angeles. Throughout the video, Iglesias is seen chasing a woman who disappears into the ocean at the end. A video for "Ritmo Total" was also filmed and features the same plot as the original. The Spanish version won Best Clip of the Year in the Latin field at the 2000 Billboard Video Music Awards.

== Background ==
Since his debut studio album, Enrique Iglesias (1995), Iglesias had established himself as one of the best-selling Latin recording artists of all time, having sold over 13 million copies by 1999. In 1998, he released his third studio album, Cosas del Amor, and embarked on the Cosas del Amor Tour (1999) to further promote the record. During one of his concerts, American actor and rapper Will Smith attended one of Iglesias's shows and was at the time working on the film Wild Wild West (1999) and its soundtrack. Smith later contacted Iglesias and requested the artist to contribute to the film's soundtrack. "He told me that he wanted me to be in the soundtrack. I'm a huge fan of his so I was like (gasp)! He called me over my portable phone and I was like, 'whoa who's this?' I didn't want to believe it the first time", Iglesias recalled. When Smith asked if Iglesias had an English-language song, Iglesias told Smith that he had recorded a song titled "Bailamos" but had not yet released it.

"Bailamos" was subsequently released as the soundtrack's second single, and it became Iglesias's first number-one song on the Billboard Hot 100. The single, along with Ricky Martin's "Livin' la Vida Loca" and "I Need to Know" by Marc Anthony, contributed to the "Latin Pop Explosion" of 1999. Prior to the release of "Bailamos", Iglesias was approached by multiple record labels, including Bertelsmann Music Group, Universal Music Group, and Warner Music Group, to sign a contract with one of them. According to his manager, Fernán Martinez, Iglesias eventually settled with Universal Music Group's contract deal of $44 million (the highest amount ever paid to a Latin artist) due to them having previously distributed his previous albums outside of the US, signing with their Interscope Records division. Part of Universal's pitch involved the artist to release an English-language album as early as the winter holiday season.

As part of the deal with the label, Iglesias would release three albums in Spanish and three in English. The first record would be in English and produced in part by Brian Rawling. The album was eventually released on 23 November 1999 as Enrique. "Bailamos" writer Paul Barry and its producers, Taylor and Rawling, worked with Iglesias again to compose and produce the album's opening track, "Rhythm Divine". The song was recorded at the Dreamhouse Studios in London, England. A Spanish-language version of song, "Ritmo Total", was also recorded with additional lyrical contributions from Spanish musician Rafael Pérez-Botija.

== Music and lyrics ==
"Rhythm Divine" is a "flamenco-flavored" rhythmic romantic dance-pop ballad that mixes Latin and Mediterranean music with "classic pop touches like synthesized beats". It is performed as a mid-tempo track. Lyrically, The Village Voice editor Grace Bastidas compared it to "We Are the World" by USA for Africa, calling it "the kind of anthem that's supposed to unite nations of the Olympics-'from the coast of Ipanema to the island of Capri'". In the lyrics, Iglesias asks "can you feel the rhythm" and chants "viva la música" ("long live music").

== Release and promotion ==
"Rhythm Divine" was released as the album's lead single in Latin America on 8 October 1999 by Interscope Records. In the United States, Interscope serviced the track to contemporary hit radio two weeks later, on 26 October. Across Europe, it was issued as two CD singles on 15 November 1999, with both discs containing various remixes of the song. The single was then released in the United Kingdom on 6 December 1999 as two CDs and a cassette single; the first CD and cassette contain the Eric Morillo main vocal remix of "Bailamos". In Japan, a CD single was issued on 8 December 1999 with various remixes of "Rhythm Divine". Another CD that also contains assorted remixes of the track was distributed in Australasia as well. In New Zealand, a CD and cassette single were released on 13 December 1999. The song was later included on Iglesias's compilation album Greatest Hits (2008), while "Ritmo Total" was featured on Enrique Iglesias: 95/08 Éxitos (2008).

The accompanying music video for "Rhythm Divine" was directed by Francis Lawrence; the budget for the shoot was $1 million. It was filmed in Hawaii, at one of the beaches in Malibu, California, and in Chinatown, Los Angeles, with over 700 extras involved. Throughout the video, Iglesias is seen chasing a woman starting from a hotel room in Hawaii, to a salon, and finally through a party crowd street in Chinatown. By the end of the video, the woman goes to the ocean in Malibu and disappears into the sea. In the US, the video was first added to the playlists of MTV on the week ending 3 October 1999. The following week, VH1 added the song to their playlists, followed by The Box on the week ending 17 October. A music video for the Spanish version was also filmed and follows the same plot as the original version. The Spanish version won in the category of Best Clip of the Year in the Latin field at the 2000 Billboard Video Music Awards.

== Critical reception ==
In the review of Enrique, AllMusic critic Stephen Thomas Erlewine noted that while "Bailamos" was a breakthrough hit for the artist, he stated that the song "pales in comparison with much of the first half of the album", citing "Rhythm Divine" as one of the tracks. Billboard editor Chuck Taylor felt that "Rhythm Divine" is "masterfully produced" and "passionately sung", and the magazine predicted that it would allow Iglesias to increase his commercial potential. The Daily Vault's Michael R. Smith called the track a "bold" anthem, regarded it as one of "the most memorable cuts" of the album. Jim Sullivan of the Boston Globe described it as an "easy, swaying new single". The San Diego Union-Tribune's Ernesto Portillo Jr. found the track to be a "near-copy" of "Bailamos".

Calling it "infectious", Edna Gundersen of USA Today referred to "Rhythm Divine" as one of the album's "several deeply romantic tracks that reveal the Iglesias gene for seductive crooning". Writing for the St. Louis Post-Dispatch, Kevin C. Johnson responded to Iglesias's "can you hear the rhythm" with a "resounding yes". The Houston Chronicle critic Joey Guerra called it a "sensual first single". Ramiro Burr of the San Antonio Express-News felt that the singer is "at his best on rhythmic romantic ballads, highlighting "Rhythm Divine" as an example. In a mixed review of Enrique, the Knoxville News Sentinel's Chuck Campbell listed "Bailamos" and "Rhythm Divine" as the "singer's best gimmick" in "his sweeping (albeit sterile) dance songs that combine romance with anthemic choruses". J.D. Considine of the Baltimore Sun, who was not impressed with the album, wrote that the song "may roll along to a Latin tropical groove".

== Chart performance ==
=== Europe ===
In Spain, "Rhythm Divine" debuted atop the AFYVE Singles Chart on 20 November 1999, giving Iglesias his second number-one single in his home country, after "Bailamos". The song spent eight weeks at the top, until 15 January 2000, when it fell to number three. It spent 14 weeks inside the Spanish top 20. At the end of 1999, AFYVE ranked the track at number 10 on their year-end chart. The song also reached number one in the Czech Republic and Romania. In the later country, the song topped the Romanian Top 100 for a single week in early 2000 and remained on the ranking for 18 weeks. At the end of 2000, it appeared at number 43 on the chart's annual airplay report. On Norway's VG-lista chart, the track debuted at number six in late 1999 and peaked at number three the following week, totalling nine weeks in the top 20. The single additionally entered the top 10 in Finland, Hungary, and Italy, peaking at number eight, six, and nine, respectively.

In Switzerland, "Rhythm Divine" stayed on the Swiss Singles Chart for 30 weeks, peaking at number 11 for two weeks in January 2000; it ended the year as Switzerland's 73rd-most-successful hit. The song became a top-20 hit in the Wallonia region of Belgium, where it debuted at number 31 on 25 December 1999 and climbed to its peak of number 17 six weeks later, on 5 February 2000. Logging 12 weeks on Wallonia's Ultratop ranking, it appeared at number 95 on the year-end edition. The song charted within the top 20 of Sweden's Sverigetopplistan chart, reaching number 18, as well as on the Dutch Top 40 in the Netherlands, where it peaked at number 20 in December 1999. The single also charted within the top 40 in Austria, France, Germany, and the Flanders region of Belgium. In the United Kingdom, the track stalled outside the top 40, reaching number 45 on the UK Singles Chart in December 1999. Overall, "Rhythm Divine" was Europe's 92nd-best-performing song of 2000 according to Music & Media magazine, peaking at number 14 on the Eurochart Hot 100.

=== North America and Australasia ===
On the US Billboard Hot 100, "Rhythm Divine" debuted at number 90 on the chart dated 4 December 1999. The song rose up the ranking over the next seven weeks, settling at a peak of number 32 on 22 January 2000 to give Iglesias his second top-40 single on the Hot 100. It remained on the chart for 17 issues. The track became a hit in US dance clubs, reaching number four on the Billboard Dance Club Play chart in February 2000. It also appeared on the Billboard Mainstream Top 40 and Rhythmic Top 40 listings, peaking at number 15 on the former chart and number 40 on the latter. The Spanish version, "Ritmo total", gave Iglesias his 12th number one on the Billboard Hot Latin Tracks chart, topping the ranking for four weeks in 1999 and 2000. It also reached number one on the Laton Pop chart, where it stayed for two issues; it remained on the ranking for 25 weeks. In addition, "Ritmo Total" reached number four on the Tropical/Salsa chart and number 22 on the Regional Mexican chart. In Mexico, the song received a gold disc in January 2000, denoting sales of over 109,000 copies.

In Canada, on 6 December 1999, "Rhythm Divine" appeared at number 29 on the RPM 100 Hit Tracks chart, becoming that week's highest debut. The following month, on 31 January, the single peaked at number seven during its seventh week on the chart. It lingered within the top 100 for 37 weeks, making its final appearance on 7 August. It was also successful on Canadian adult contemporary radio, climbing to number 20 on the RPM Adult Contemporary Tracks ranking in February 2000. In Australia, "Rhythm Divine" spent four weeks on the ARIA Singles Chart, reaching number 36 during its third week in the top 50. On New Zealand's RIANZ Singles Chart, the song became a number-two hit in January 2000, logging 14 nonconsecutive weeks in the top 50. The Recording Industry Association of New Zealand (RIANZ) certified the song gold for sales exceeding 5,000 copies.

== Live performances ==
Iglesias performed "Rhythm Divine" at several holiday concerts promoted by local radio stations in Houston, Boston, and New York. He then sung the track at the 27th Annual American Music Awards on 17 January 2000. A month after the performance at the award ceremony, he sang "Rhythm Divine" at the 2000 Viña del Mar International Song Festival and later at the Houston Livestock Show and Rodeo. In March, he played the song at two shows in Europe, namely at The Dome in Germany and at the Stockholm Globe Arena in Switzerland. "Rhythm Divine" was one of three songs Iglesias performed along with "Bailamos" and "Be with You" after being interviewed by Dan Matheson on CTV's Canada AM on 5 April 2000. A month later, he performed at the "Your Smoke Free" Concert in San Diego and was present at KDWB's Star Party 2000 in Minneapolis.

Radio personality Howard Stern obtained an "off-the-board feed" tape of Iglesias singing "Rhythm Divine" while the artist was lip syncing to the song during a performance in Europe. During the tape, Iglesias could be heard "discordant voice caterwauling" the song. The artist agreed to perform the song on Stern's show and did so as an acoustic take with Tony Rey on the guitar. After hearing him perform, Stern declared, "That proves it. You can sing". Afterwards, Iglesias sang the track at the B96 Summer Bash Saturday in Chicago. In 2000, Iglesias was the opening act at the Aladdin Theater following the venue's remodeling.

"Rhythm Divine" was subsequently included on the set list for his Escape Tour (2002), the 7 Tour (2004), the Insomniac Tour (2007–08), the Greatest Hits Tour (2009), the Euphoria Tour (2011–12), and the Enrique Iglesias & Jennifer Lopez Tour (2012). During Iglesias's concert at the American Airlines Arena in 2002, Sun-Sentinel writer Sean Piccoli noted that the song "in particular, spurred a rousing, full-house crowd chorus that Iglesias looked ecstatic to be conducting, if not exactly leading with his voice".

== Track listings ==
European CD1

1. "Rhythm Divine" – 3:29
2. "Rhythm Divine" (Fernando G club mix) – 5:34

European CD2

1. "Rhythm Divine" – 3:29
2. "Rhythm Divine" (Morales radio mix) – 3:13
3. "Rhythm Divine" (stereo dub mix) – 7:20
4. "Rhythm Divine" (Lord G's Divine dub) – 6:46

UK CD1

1. "Rhythm Divine" – 3:29
2. "Bailamos" (Eric Morillo main vocal mix) – 6:30
3. "Rhythm Divine" (CD-ROM video)

UK CD2

1. "Rhythm Divine" (Morales radio mix) – 3:13
2. "Rhythm Divine" (Fernando G club mix) – 5:34
3. "Rhythm Divine" (Mijango's extended mix) – 6:57

UK cassette single

1. "Rhythm Divine" – 3:29
2. "Bailamos" (Eric Morillo main vocal mix) – 6:30

Australasian CD single

1. "Rhythm Divine" (album version)
2. "Rhythm Divine" (Fernando's English radio edit)
3. "Rhythm Divine" (Morales club mix)
4. "Rhythm Divine" (Fernando's English club mix)
5. "Rhythm Divine" (Lord G's Divine dub)
6. "Rhythm Divine" (Mijango's English extended mix)

Japanese CD single

1. "Rhythm Divine"
2. "Rhythm Divine" (Morales radio mix)
3. "Rhythm Divine" (stereo dub mix)
4. "Rhythm Divine" (Lord G's Divine dub)

== Credits and personnel ==
Credits are lifted from the Enrique album booklet.

Studios

- Recorded at Dreamhouse Studios (London, England)
- "Ritmo total" additionally recorded at Circle House Studios (London, England)

Personnel

- Paul Barry – writing, background vocals
- Mark Taylor – writing, production, mixing
- Sylvia Mason-James – background vocals
- Adam Phillips – guitars
- Brian Rawling – production

Additional "Ritmo total" personnel

- Rafael Pérez-Botija – adaption and Spanish vocal direction
- Ivy Scoff – production coordination
- Mark Taylor – engineering
- Carlos Paucar – engineering
- Niko Marzouca – assistant engineering

== Charts ==
=== Weekly charts ===
Weekly chart performance for "Rhythm Divine"
Chart (1999–2000)	Peak position
Australia (ARIA)	36
Austria (Ö3 Austria Top 40)	26
Belgium (Ultratop 50 Flanders)	31
Belgium (Ultratop 50 Wallonia)	17
Canada Top Singles (RPM)	7
Canada Adult Contemporary (RPM)	20
Czech Republic (IFPI)	1
Europe (Eurochart Hot 100)	14
Finland (Suomen virallinen lista)	8
France (SNEP)	27
Germany (GfK)	24
Hungary (Mahasz)	6
Italy (Musica e dischi)	9
Italy Airplay (Music & Media)	2
Netherlands (Dutch Top 40)	20
Netherlands (Single Top 100)	25
New Zealand (Recorded Music NZ)	2
Norway (VG-lista)	3
Romania (Romanian Top 100)	1
Scottish Singles Sales (Official Charts)	45
Spain (Promusicae)	1
Sweden (Sverigetopplistan)	18
Switzerland (Schweizer Hitparade)	11
UK Singles (Official Charts)	45
US Billboard Hot 100	32
US Dance Club Songs (Billboard)	4
US Pop Airplay (Billboard)	15
US Rhythmic Airplay (Billboard)	40

Weekly chart performance for "Ritmo Total"
Chart (1999–2000)	Peak position
US Hot Latin Songs (Billboard)	1
US Latin Pop Airplay (Billboard)	1
US Regional Mexican Airplay (Billboard)	22
US Tropical Airplay (Billboard)	4

=== Year-end charts ===
1999 year-end chart performance for "Rhythm Divine"
Chart (1999)	Position
Italy (Musica e dischi)	100
Netherlands (Dutch Top 40)	149
Spain (AFYVE)	10

2000 year-end chart performance for "Rhythm Divine"
Chart (2000)	Position
Belgium (Ultratop 50 Wallonia)	95
Europe (Eurochart Hot 100)	92
Romania (Romanian Top 100)	43
Switzerland (Schweizer Hitparade)	73

2000 year-end chart performance for "Ritmo total"
Chart (2000)	Position
US Hot Latin Tracks (Billboard)	26

== Certifications ==
Certifications and sales for "Rhythm Divine"
Region	Certification	Certified units/sales
Mexico (AMPROFON)	Gold	109,300
New Zealand (RMNZ)	Gold	5,000^{*}
^{*} Sales figures based on certification alone.

== Release history ==
Release dates and formats for "Rhythm Divine"
Region	Date	Format(s)	Label(s)	Ref.
Latin America	8 October 1999	Contemporary hit radio	Interscope	
United States	26 October 1999	Contemporary hit radio	Interscope	
Europe	15 November 1999	CD	Interscope	
United Kingdom	6 December 1999	CD; cassette	Interscope	
Japan	8 December 1999	CD	Interscope	
New Zealand	13 December 1999	CD; cassette	Interscope	

== See also ==
- List of number-one singles of 1999 (Spain)
- List of number-one singles of 2000 (Spain)
- List of Romanian Top 100 number ones of the 2000s
- List of number-one Billboard Hot Latin Tracks of 1999
- List of number-one Billboard Hot Latin Tracks of 2000
- List of Billboard Latin Pop Airplay number ones of 1999
