= Mentiroso (Enrique Iglesias song) =

Single by Enrique Iglesias

from the album Quizás
- Released: 22 July 2002
- Recorded: February–May 2002
- Studio: Nadir Studios (Madrid, Spain); South Point Studios (Miami Beach, Florida); Larrabee Studios; Westlake Studio; Westlake Audio (Hollywood, California); Compass Point Studios; The Hit Factory Critiera (Miami, Florida)
- Genre: Latin pop; Mariachi
- Length: 4:00
- Label: Universal Music Latino
- Songwriters: Cheín García Alonso; Enrique Iglesias
- Producers: Léster Méndez; Enrique Iglesias

Enrique Iglesias singles chronology
"Maybe" (2002)	"Mentiroso" (2002)	"Quizás" (2002)

Music video
- "Mentiroso" on YouTube

"Mentiroso" (English: Liar) is the first single released internationally by Spanish singer-songwriter Enrique Iglesias from his fourth full-Spanish album, Quizás (2002), It was released on 22 July 2002 (see 2002 in music).

== Song information ==
The track was written by Cheín García-Alonso and Enrique Iglesias. It was released to U.S. radio outlets on 22 July 2002 in two versions, ballad and mariachi, making the first time that any Iglesias single is released with mariachi.

== Chart performance ==
The track debuted on the United States Billboard Hot Latin Tracks chart at number 6 on 10 August 2002, and rose to number 1 six weeks later, spending one week at the summit. The single spent 13 weeks in the top 10.

Chart (2002)	Peak position
U.S. Billboard Hot Latin Tracks	1
U.S. Billboard Latin Pop Airplay	1
U.S. Billboard Latin Regional Mexican Airplay	6
U.S. Billboard Latin Tropical/Salsa Airplay	4
U.S. Billboard Bubbling Under Hot 100 Singles	5

== See also ==
- List of number-one Billboard Hot Latin Tracks of 2002
