= Bailamos =

1999 single by Enrique Iglesias

Single by Enrique Iglesias

from the album Wild Wild West: Music Inspired by the Motion Picture and Enrique
- B-side: "Nunca te olvidaré"
- Released: 18 June 1999 (Japan)
- Genre: Latin pop
- Length: 3:38
- Label: Fonovisa; Universal
- Songwriters: Paul Barry; Mark Taylor
- Producers: Mark Taylor; Brian Rawling

Enrique Iglesias singles chronology
"Nunca te olvidaré" (1998)	"Bailamos" (1999)	"Rhythm Divine" (1999)

Music video
- "Bailamos" on YouTube

"Bailamos" (English: "We Dance") is a single by Spanish singer Enrique Iglesias sung in English with some lines in Spanish. The song was released in 1999 as part of the soundtrack to the film Wild Wild West (1999) and later included on Iglesias's fourth and debut English-language album, Enrique (1999). "Bailamos" reached number one on the Spanish Singles Chart and on the US Billboard Hot 100, and it became a top-three hit in Canada, Hungary, New Zealand, Norway, and Sweden. In both New Zealand and Spain, it was the second-most-successful single of 1999.

== Background ==
"Bailamos" was written by Paul Barry and Mark Taylor and produced by Barry and Brian Rawling, the same team which wrote and produced Cher's hit "Believe". The track first appeared on a limited edition of Enrique Iglesias' 1998 Spanish studio album Cosas del Amor and was released as a single in parts of Latin America and Europe. After attending one of Enrique's concerts in March 1999, Will Smith asked Iglesias to contribute to the soundtrack of his upcoming movie Wild Wild West and "Bailamos" was chosen to appear. The song quickly became most requested on pop radio in New York, Los Angeles and Miami. Due to the song's popularity, it was released as a single throughout the world. In English, "Bailamos" means "We Dance". In the United States, the song was seen as part of a wave of crossover music from Latin American singers and a general increase in interest in Latin music, which was started by Ricky Martin's release "Livin' la Vida Loca" as well as Carlos Santana's collaboration with Matchbox 20 frontman Rob Thomas of "Smooth". The success of "Bailamos" was a breakthrough for Iglesias, which enabled him to sign a multi-album deal with Interscope Records. The song would go on to appear on his debut English album Enrique, though slightly altered to fit with the sound of the album. The soundtrack version has a different arrangement in mix from the version of the album.

== Composition ==
"Bailamos" has elements of flamenco and was written in the key of A minor. The bridge follows Andalusian Cadence with an introduction of E major. The guitar solo was played by Jesusin Cruz.

== Critical reception ==
Larry Flick from Billboard wrote that the song "has all the makings of a smash, with or without the burgeoning Latin-pop explosion." He noted that "sporting a flamenco guitar and other Southwestern influences amid a contemporary shuffling beat, "Bailamos" moves along at a pace that's much more relaxed than [Ricky] Martin's "Livin' la Vida Loca", but it is still lively enough to work up a bit of a froth on the dancefloor circuit, especially after it gets a tasty remix treatment, which is bound to be in the works. The hook here is as satisfying as lemonade on a hot summer day, thanks to songwriters Paul Barry and Mark Taylor, the team behind Cher's worldwide smash "Believe"". He also added that Iglesias is "an enchanting and sensuous presence, and with this exceptional song he certainly seems poised for the greatest breakthrough of his career." The Daily Vault's Michael R. Smith called it a "bold" anthem, noting that it perhaps is one of "the most memorable cuts" of the album. Leah Greenblatt from Entertainment Weekly described it as a "horn-heavy invitation to the dance floor". Swedish newspaper Expressen said that it "sounds like a mix" of George Michael and Julio Iglesias.

== Commercial performance ==
The track peaked at number one for two weeks on the US Billboard Hot 100 and became the 11th number-one single for Iglesias on the Billboard Hot Latin Tracks chart for one week. The single also peaked at number one on the Billboard Dance Club Play chart, while on the Billboard Adult Contemporary chart, it reached number 25. Internationally, "Bailamos" topped the Spanish Singles Chart for five weeks and reached the top 10 in Canada, Germany, Iceland, the Netherlands, New Zealand, Norway, Sweden, Switzerland, Wallonia, and on the UK Singles Chart. In New Zealand, "Bailamos" was the second-most-successful single of 1999.

== Music videos ==
The song was adapted into three different music videos:

- The original music video for the song was shot in Miami. It has a montage of different scenes involving Iglesias, starting off with a scene of Iglesias in an apartment talking on the phone and later looking out of a window to the Miami skyline. Subsequent scenes involve Iglesias walking the streets and staring into a building as he watches two salsa dancers.
- After the song was chosen to be part of the Wild Wild West soundtrack, a second video directed by Nigel Dick was made. A portion of this video was shot in Mexico, while most of it shot in the backlot at Universal Studios. In this video, Iglesias is depicted as a wanted man with the opening shot being a poster calling for his capture "dead or alive". Entering a sleepy Mexican town, he attracts several women who dance around him. Picking one out, they kiss until they are interrupted by people trying to claim the reward to which both Iglesias and his love interest manage to escape. The video also contains small snippets of scenes from the Wild Wild West film.
- The third music video of the song is directed by Paul Hunter, another famous music video director. Unlike the first two, this video is plotless and simply features Iglesias as a barman in a night club as he watches salsa dancers on stage. It is also intercut with shots of Iglesias interacting with the lead dancer played by Staci Flood. The video ends with Iglesias and Flood leaving the now-empty club.

== Track listings ==
European CD single

1. "Bailamos"
2. "Nunca te olvidaré"
3. "Bailamos" (Groove Brothers remix)

UK CD1

1. "Bailamos" (album version) – 3:37
2. "Bailamos" (The Groove Brothers remix) – 5:06
3. "Bailamos" (Fernando's Latin mix) – 5:30

UK CD2

1. "Bailamos" (The Groove Brothers radio edit) – 3:25
2. "Bailamos" (Davidson Ospina club mix) – 6:08
3. "Bailamos" (video—Paul Hunter version) – 3:36

UK cassette single

1. "Bailamos" (album version) – 3:37
2. "Bailamos" (The Groove Brothers radio edit) – 3:25

US maxi-CD single

1. "Bailamos" (Harry "Choo Choo" Romero & Erick Morillo vocal mix) – 6:29
2. "Bailamos" (Fernando G. Latin mix) – 5:30
3. "Bailamos" (Ospina Club Anthem mix) – 6:08
4. "Bailamos" (Pablo La Rosa techno dub) – 6:13
5. "Bailamos" (Mijangos Recycled dub) – 9:23
6. "Bailamos" (album version) – 3:38

US CD and cassette single

1. "Bailamos" (album version) – 3:38
2. "Bailamos" (Latin radio mix) – 3:45

US 12-inch single

A1. "Bailamos" (Harry "Choo Choo" Romero & Eric Morillo vocal mix) – 6:29
A2. "Bailamos" (Fernando's Latin mix) – 5:30
B1. "Bailamos" (Mijangos Recycled dub) – 9:23
B2. "Bailamos" (album version) – 3:38

Australasian CD single

1. "Bailamos"
2. "Bailamos" (Groove Brothers radio mix)
3. "Nunca te olvidaré"
4. "Bailamos" (Groove Brothers remix)

Japanese CD single

1. "Bailamos" (Groove Brothers radio mix)
2. "Bailamos" (album version)
3. "Bailamos" (Groove Brothers club mix)
4. "Bailamos" (Groove Brothers remix instrumental)

== Charts ==
=== Weekly charts ===
Chart (1999)	Peak position
Australia (ARIA)	13
Austria (Ö3 Austria Top 40)	17
Belgium (Ultratop 50 Flanders)	11
Belgium (Ultratop 50 Wallonia)	6
Canada (Nielsen SoundScan)	1
Canada CHR (Nielsen BDS)	3
Canada Top Singles (RPM)	2
Canada Adult Contemporary (RPM)	1
Canada Dance/Urban (RPM)	3
Czech Republic (IFPI)	13
Denmark (IFPI)	8
El Salvador (Notimex)	4
Europe (Eurochart Hot 100)	4
Finland (Suomen virallinen lista)	18
France (SNEP)	6
Germany (GfK)	10
Greece (IFPI Greece)	6
Guatemala (Notimex)	5
Honduras (Notimex)	4
Hungary (Mahasz)	2
Iceland (Íslenski Listinn Topp 40)	8
Ireland (IRMA)	15
Italy (Musica e dischi)	12
Italy Airplay (Music & Media)	5
Netherlands (Dutch Top 40)	4
Netherlands (Single Top 100)	4
New Zealand (Recorded Music NZ)	2
Nicaragua (Notimex)	5
Norway (VG-lista)	3
Panama (Notimex)	1
Scottish Singles Sales (Official Charts)	8
Spain (Promusicae)	1
Sweden (Sverigetopplistan)	2
Switzerland (Schweizer Hitparade)	8
UK Singles (Official Charts)	4
US Billboard Hot 100	1
US Adult Contemporary (Billboard)	14
US Adult Pop Airplay (Billboard)	35
US Dance Club Songs (Billboard)	1
US Dance Singles Sales (Billboard)	3
US Hot Latin Songs (Billboard)	1
US Pop Airplay (Billboard)	4

Chart (2025–2026)	Peak position
Netherlands Airplay (Dutch Charts)	49
Poland (Polish Airplay Top 100)	58

=== Year-end charts ===
Chart (1999)	Position
Australia (ARIA)	55
Belgium (Ultratop 50 Flanders)	59
Belgium (Ultratop 50 Wallonia)	26
Canada Top Singles (RPM)	17
Canada Adult Contemporary (RPM)	7
Canada Dance/Urban (RPM)	23
Europe (Eurochart Hot 100)	25
France (SNEP)	36
Germany (Media Control)	77
Netherlands (Dutch Top 40)	23
Netherlands (Single Top 100)	31
New Zealand (RIANZ)	2
Romania (Romanian Top 100)	5
Spain (AFYVE)	2
Sweden (Hitlistan)	22
UK Singles (OCC)	89
US Billboard Hot 100	26
US Adult Contemporary (Billboard)	42
US Dance Club Play (Billboard)	33
US Hot Latin Tracks (Billboard)	7
US Mainstream Top 40 (Billboard)	33
US Maxi-Singles Sales (Billboard)	30
US Rhythmic Top 40 (Billboard)	30

Chart (2000)	Position
US Adult Contemporary (Billboard)	48

== Certifications and sales ==
Region	Certification	Certified units/sales
Australia (ARIA)	Gold	35,000^{^}
Belgium (BRMA)	Gold	25,000^{*}
France (SNEP)	Gold	250,000^{*}
New Zealand (RMNZ)	Gold	5,000^{*}
Norway (IFPI Norway)	Gold	
Russia (NFPF) Ringtone	Gold	100,000^{*}
Spain (Promusicae)	Gold	25,000^{^}
Sweden (GLF)	Platinum	30,000^{^}
United Kingdom (BPI) 1999 release	Silver	200,000^{^}
United Kingdom (BPI) 2004 release	Gold	400,000^{‡}
United States	—	700,000
^{*} Sales figures based on certification alone.^{^} Shipments figures based on certification alone.^{‡} Sales+streaming figures based on certification alone.

== Release history ==
Region	Date	Format(s)	Label(s)	Ref(s).
Spain	1999	CD	Fonovisa; Universal	
United States	15 June 1999	Promotional 12-inch vinyl	Interscope; Overbrook	
Japan	18 June 1999	CD	Universal Music Japan	
United States	29 June 1999	Contemporary hit radio	Interscope; Overbrook	
United States	3 August 1999	12-inch vinyl	Interscope; Overbrook	
United States	10 August 1999	CD; cassette	Interscope; Overbrook	
United Kingdom	30 August 1999	CD; cassette	Interscope	

== Cover versions ==
In 1999, Japanese singer Hideki Saijo sang the Japanese version of "Bailamos" under the title "Bailamos ~ Tonight We Dance" and has a remix version of the same song in 2000 under the title "Bailamos 2000". A year after the "Bailamos" release, in 2000, Sean Paul sampled the melody of the refrain in his song "Tiger Bone" featuring Mr. Vegas on his debut studio album Stage One. The use was uncredited, changing the lyrics from "Bailamos... let the rhythm take you over, bailamos... te quiero, amor mio" to "Tiger bone... when mi drink it and rub on a piece a stone... di gal dem bend up, when mi sen up". American Idol season 3 auditionee William Hung covered the album for his 2004 album Inspiration, albeit it was quite negatively received.

== See also ==
- List of number-one singles of 1999 (Spain)
- Lists of Billboard number-one singles
- List of number-one Billboard Hot Latin Tracks of 1999
- List of number-one dance singles of 1999 (U.S.)
- List of best-selling Latin singles
