= Enrique (album) =

Studio album by Enrique Iglesias
- Released: 23 November 1999
- Recorded: May–October 1999
- Genres: Dance-pop; adult contemporary
- Length: 51:40
- Languages: English; Spanish
- Label: Interscope
- Producers: Estéfano; David Foster; Enrique Iglesias; Rhett Lawrence; Patrick Leonard; Lester Mendez; Rick Nowels; Brian Rawling; Mark Taylor; Walter Turbitt

Enrique Iglesias chronology
Bailamos Greatest Hits (1999)	Enrique (1999)	The Best Hits (1999)

Singles from Enrique
- 1. "Bailamos" Released: 18 June 1999; 2. "Rhythm Divine" Released: 8 October 1999; 3. "Be with You" Released: 24 February 2000; 4. "Could I Have This Kiss Forever" Released: 25 July 2000; 5. "Sad Eyes" Released: 9 September 2000

Professional ratings
Review scores
Source	Rating
AllMusic	4/5 stars
The Fresno Bee	C−
MTV Asia	7/10

Enrique is the debut English album and fourth studio album by Enrique Iglesias. It was released on 23 November 1999. The album launched two number one US Billboard Hot 100 hits, "Bailamos" and "Be with You".

== Background ==
After the success of his first English crossover single "Bailamos", Iglesias signed a multi-album deal with Interscope and spent the next two months recording the first English album. Knowing that Iglesias was a Bruce Springsteen fan, Interscope chairman Jimmy Iovine recommended that Iglesias covered the Springsteen track "Sad Eyes" which had recently been released on Springsteen's collection of rare recordings Tracks. The album also contains a duet with Whitney Houston, titled "Could I Have This Kiss Forever", which Iglesias and Houston recorded separately. Iglesias recorded the song in Los Angeles and Houston in Hamburg, Germany with both of them singing with each other over the phone. They did eventually meet when they re-recorded the track for the single release. The album also included the crossover song "Bailamos" which had previously been on a special edition of Enrique's Cosas del Amor album and the Wild Wild West soundtrack. The album cover was photographed by Pepe Botella.

== Commercial performance ==
The album debuted at number 33 on Billboard 200 albums chart and would go on to be certified Platinum in the United States for shipping 1 million units. It was certified for two platinum awards by IFPI Europe, for selling 2 million units all over Europe. The album was a success in Canada too, where it became 5 times Platinum. It achieved Platinum status in Australia and New Zealand and Gold in Mexico and other countries.

== Track listing ==
Enrique standard edition track listing
No.	Title	Writer(s)	Producer(s)	Length
1.	"Rhythm Divine"	Paul Barry, Mark Taylor	Taylor, Brian Rawling	3:29
2.	"Be with You"	Enrique Iglesias, Barry, Taylor	Taylor, Rawling	3:40
3.	"I Have Always Loved You"	Rick Nowels, Billy Steinberg, Marie Claire D'Ubaldo	Taylor, Rawling, Walter Turbitt	4:24
4.	"Sad Eyes"	Bruce Springsteen	Iglesias, Lester Mendez	4:08
5.	"I'm Your Man"	Iglesias, Patrick Leonard	Leonard	4:43
6.	"Óyeme" ("Listen")	Iglesias, Estéfano, Nowels, Steinberg	Iglesias, Mendez, Estéfano, Nowels	4:22
7.	"Could I Have This Kiss Forever" (duet with Whitney Houston)	Diane Warren	David Foster	4:21
8.	"You're My #1"	Iglesias, Mendez	Iglesias, Mendez	4:29
9.	"Alabao"	Iglesias, Chein García-Alonso, Rhett Lawrence	Lawrence, Iglesias	4:00
10.	"Bailamos"	Barry, Taylor	Taylor, Rawling	3:34
11.	"Ritmo Total" (Rhythm Divine)	Barry, Taylor, Rafael Pérez-Botija	Taylor, Rawling	3:33
12.	"Más Es Amar" (Sad Eyes)	Springsteen, Pérez-Botija	Iglesias, Mendez	4:14
13.	"No Puedo Más Sin Ti" (I'm Your Man)	Iglesias, Leonard, Pérez-Botija	Leonard	4:48
Total length:				51:40

Asian edition alternative track
No.	Title	Length
8.	"You're My #1" (duet with Valen Hsu)

Brazilian edition bonus tracks
No.	Title	Length
14.	"You're My #1" (with Sandy & Junior; Portuguese / English version)
15.	"You're My #1" (with Sandy & Junior; English version)

Russian edition alternative track
No.	Title	Length
8.	"You're My #1" (duet with Alsou)

UK and Europe bonus track
No.	Title	Length
14.	"Rhythm Divine" (Fernando Garibay Remix)	3:48

Japanese bonus tracks
No.	Title	Length
14.	"Rhythm Divine" (Fernando Garibay Remix)	3:48
15.	"Bailamos" (Fernando Garibay Latin Remix)	4:19

Australian bonus disc
No.	Title	Length
1.	"Bailamos" (Groove Brothers Radio Edit)	3:25
2.	"Bailamos" (Groove Brothers Extended Mix)	5:07
3.	"Rhythm Divine" (Fernando's English Club Mix)	5:35
4.	"Rhythm Divine" (Morales Club Mix)	7:36
5.	"Rhythm Divine" (Lord G's Divine Dub)	6:48
6.	"Rhythm Divine" (Mijango's English Extended Mix)	6:57
7.	"Be with You" (Fernando Garibay's Club Mix)	7:45
8.	"Be with You" (Thunderpuss 2000 12" Club Mix)	8:17
9.	"Be with You" (Thunderpuss 2000 Thunderdub)	8:17
10.	"Be with You" (Mijango's Extended Mix)	5:02

== Charts ==
=== Weekly charts ===
Weekly chart performance for Enrique
Chart (1999–2000)	Peak position
Australian Albums (ARIA)	11
Austrian Albums (Ö3 Austria)	12
Belgian Albums (Ultratop Flanders)	19
Belgian Albums (Ultratop Wallonia)	35
Canadian Albums (Billboard)	4
Danish Albums (Hitlisten)	6
Dutch Albums (Album Top 100)	13
European Top 100 Albums (Music & Media)	8
Finnish Albums (Suomen virallinen lista)	20
French Albums (SNEP)	51
German Albums (Offizielle Top 100)	7
Hungarian Albums (MAHASZ)	14
Irish Albums (IRMA)	40
Italian Albums (FIMI)	18
Japanese Albums (Oricon)	40
Mexican Albums (Top 100 Mexico)	3
New Zealand Albums (RMNZ)	10
Norwegian Albums (VG-lista)	3
Polish Albums (ZPAV)	29
Portuguese Albums (AFP)	1
Scottish Albums (Official Charts)	88
Spanish Albums (PROMUSICAE)	1
Swedish Albums (Sverigetopplistan)	19
Swiss Albums (Schweizer Hitparade)	3
UK Albums (Official Charts)	80
US Billboard 200	33

=== Year-end charts ===
Year-end chart performance for Enrique
Chart (2000)	Position
Australian Albums (ARIA)	51
Austrian Albums (Ö3 Austria)	26
Belgian Albums (Ultratop Flanders)	64
Belgian Albums (Ultratop Wallonia)	89
Canadian Albums (Nielsen SoundScan)	13
Danish Albums (Hitlisten)	18
Dutch Albums (Album Top 100)	44
European Albums (Music & Media)	18
German Albums (Offizielle Top 100)	20
Norwegian Christmas Period Albums (VG-lista)	4
Norwegian Winter Period Albums (VG-lista)	19
Spanish Albums (AFYVE)	23
Swedish Albums (Sverigetopplistan)	79
Swiss Albums (Schweizer Hitparade)	9
US Billboard 200	43

== Certifications and sales ==
Certifications and sales for Enrique
Region	Certification	Certified units/sales
Argentina (CAPIF)	Platinum	60,000^{^}
Australia (ARIA)	Platinum	70,000^{^}
Austria (IFPI Austria)	Gold	25,000^{*}
Canada (Music Canada)	5× Platinum	500,000^{^}
Denmark (IFPI Danmark)	3× Platinum	60,000^{‡}
France (SNEP)	Gold	100,000^{*}
Germany (BVMI)	Platinum	300,000^{^}
Hungary (MAHASZ)	Gold	
New Zealand (RMNZ)	Platinum	15,000^{^}
Norway (IFPI Norway)	Gold	65,000
Poland (ZPAV)	2× Platinum	200,000^{*}
Spain (Promusicae)	4× Platinum	500,000
Switzerland (IFPI Switzerland)	Platinum	50,000^{^}
United Kingdom (BPI)	Gold	100,000^{*}
United States (RIAA)	Platinum	2,100,000
Summaries
Europe (IFPI)	2× Platinum	2,000,000^{*}
^{*} Sales figures based on certification alone.^{^} Shipments figures based on certification alone.^{‡} Sales+streaming figures based on certification alone.
