= Remixes (Enrique Iglesias album) =

Remix album by Enrique Iglesias
- Released: 5 May 1998
- Recorded: 1995–1998
- Genre: Latin pop, pop
- Length: 41:57
- Label: Fonovisa

Enrique Iglesias chronology
Vivir (1997)	Remixes (1998)	Cosas Del Amor (1998)

Professional ratings
Review scores
Source	Rating
Allmusic	link

Remixes is a compilation album of remixes, and third overall release, from Latin pop singer Enrique Iglesias. The album was released on 5 May 1998. The album contains a number of remixes of tracks from Iglesias' first two albums, Enrique Iglesias and Vivir. The album was the first of three compilation releases made available by Fonovisa before Iglesias signed a deal with Interscope records in 1999. The album contains the first release of the English-language version of "Sólo En Ti", titled "Only You", which was later re-released on the more commercial release Bailamos Greatest Hits, released in 1999.The album was certified gold in u.s with sales of 500,000 copies.

== Track listing ==
No.	Title	Writer(s)	Translation	Length
1.	"Experiencia Religiosa" (Radio version)	Chein García Alonso	Religious Experience	4:10
2.	"Sólo En Ti" (Bilingual version)	Enrique Iglesias, Vince Clarke	Only You	3:34
3.	"Lluvia Cae" (Remix)	Enrique Iglesias, Rafael Pérez-Botija	Rain Falls	4:38
4.	"Si Tú Te Vas" (Remix)	Enrique Iglesias, Roberto Morales	If You Leave	4:28
5.	"Only You" ("Sólo En Ti" English version)	Enrique Iglesias, Vince Clarke	Only You	3:34
6.	"Experiencia Religiosa" (Discothèque version)	Chein García Alonso	Religious Experience	5:22
7.	"Por Amarte" (Remix)	Enrique Iglesias, Roberto Morales	To Love You	3:52
8.	"Miente" (Remix)	Rafael Pérez-Botija	Lie	3:41
9.	"Sólo En Ti" (Remix)	Enrique Iglesias, Vince Clarke	Only You	3:34
10.	"Muñeca Cruel" (Latin Dance remix)	Rafael Pérez Botija	Cruel Doll	4:19

== Charts ==
Chart (1999)	Peak position
US Top Latin Albums (Billboard)	11
US Latin Pop Albums (Billboard)	6
