= The Best Hits (Enrique Iglesias album) =

Compilation album by Enrique Iglesias
- Released: November 24, 1999
- Recorded: 1994–99
- Genre: Pop, Latin pop
- Label: Fonovisa
- Producer: Rafael Pérez Botija

Enrique Iglesias chronology
Enrique (1999)	The Best Hits (1999)	15 Kilates Musicales (2001)

The Best Hits is the second greatest hits album, and seventh overall release, from pop singer Enrique Iglesias. The album was released by Fonovisa after Iglesias had left them, and is the second of three compilation releases made available following his departure. The collection includes a number of album tracks and popular singles, although due to the release of Bailamos Greatest Hits a few months prior, failed to sell highly in the United States or Latin America. Unlike its predecessor, the album contains more singles than album tracks, and could be seen as more of a greatest hits than Bailamos Greatest Hits. The album was certified gold in the US for selling over 500,000 copies.

== Track listing ==
No.	Title	Writer(s)	Translation	Length
1.	"No Llores Por Mí"	Enrique Iglesias, Roberto Morales	Do Not Cry for Me	4:11
2.	"Enamorado por primera vez"	Enrique Iglesias	Love to See You	4:29
3.	"Si Tú Te Vas"	Enrique Iglesias, Roberto Morales	If You Are Going	4:00
4.	"Bailamos"	Paul Barry, Mark Taylor	We Dance	3:25
5.	"Por Amarte"	Enrique Iglesias, Roberto Morales	By Love	4:00
6.	"Esperanza"	Enrique Iglesias, Chein García-Alonso	Hope	3:09
7.	"Nunca te olvidaré"	Enrique Iglesias	I'll Never Forget	4:24
8.	"Miente"	Rafael Pérez Botija	Lies	3:36
9.	"Volveré"	Enrique Iglesias, Roberto Morales	Come Back	4:37
10.	"Si Juras Regresar"	Rafael Pérez Botija	If You Swear Back	4:24
11.	"Al despertar"	Enrique Iglesias, Roberto Morales	Upon Awakening	4:15
12.	"Cosas del amor"	Rafael Pérez Botija	Regarding Love	4:31
13.	"Trapecista"	Rafael Pérez Botija	Aerialist	4:27
14.	"Falta Tanto Amor"	Enrique Iglesias, Roberto Morales	Lack Much Love	3:54
15.	"Experiencia Religiosa"	Chein García Alonso	Mystical Experience	5:32

== Charts ==
Chart (1999–2000)	Peak position
US Billboard 200	175
US Top Latin Albums (Billboard)	2
US Latin Pop Albums (Billboard)	1
US Independent Albums (Billboard)	8

== Certifications and sales ==
Region	Certification	Certified units/sales
United States (RIAA)	Gold	500,000^{^}
^{^} Shipments figures based on certification alone.

== See also ==
- List of number-one Billboard Top Latin Albums from the 1990s
- List of number-one Billboard Latin Pop Albums from the 1990s
