= Bailamos Greatest Hits =

Compilation album by Enrique Iglesias
- Released: 1 June 1999
- Recorded: 1994–99
- Genre: Pop, Latin pop
- Label: Fonovisa

Enrique Iglesias chronology
Cosas Del Amor (1998)	Bailamos Greatest Hits (1999)	Enrique (1999)

Bailamos: Greatest Hits is the first greatest hits album, and fifth overall release, from pop singer Enrique Iglesias. The album was released by Fonovisa after Iglesias had left them, and signed a deal with Interscope, who promptly sued Fonovisa for using the song "Bailamos" when it was recorded on their label.

Despite the title of Greatest Hits, the album contains mostly album tracks that were never released as singles. "Nunca Te Olvidaré" and "Esperanza" were both hits for Iglesias, but appear here as radically altered remixes. Also included on the album was the then rare recording of the English version of "Sólo En Ti". Despite the album not being endorsed by Iglesias or his management, the album sold reasonably well, going Gold in the United States and going on to sell over a million copies worldwide. The album was released during the period in which Iglesias was recording his English debut album, and it has been speculated that many bought the album mistakenly thinking that it was his English crossover album, an understandable mistake given the album shared its main title with Iglesias's first English crossover hit. The album does not contribute to Iglesias' official record sales and is considered apocryphal by some fans. After this release, Fonovisa released another compilation album, the properly titled The Best Hits, which contained Iglesias' best performing Spanish-language singles at the time, but it was quickly removed from shelves due to the substantially larger sales of Bailamos Greatest Hits.

== Track listing ==
No.	Title	Writer(s)	Translation	Length
1.	"Bailamos" (Groove Brothers Mix)	Paul Barry, Mark Taylor	Let's Dance	3:25
2.	"Si Juras Regresar"	Rafael Pérez Botija	If You Promise to Return	4:24
3.	"Tu vacío"	Rafael Pérez-Botija	Your emptiness	3:58
4.	"El muro"	Rafael Pérez-Botija	The Wall	4:19
5.	"Falta Tanto Amor"	Enrique Iglesias, Roberto Morales	Lack Much Love	3:54
6.	"Esperanza" (Radio Mix)	Enrique Iglesias, García-Alonso	Hope	3:16
7.	"Only You"	Enrique Iglesias, Vince Clarke	Sólo En Ti	3:34
8.	"Inalcanzable"	Enrique Iglesias, Roberto Morales	Unattainable	3:33
9.	"Viviré y moriré"	Enrique Iglesias	I'll Live and I'll Die	4:07
10.	"Nunca te olvidaré" (Radio Mix)	Enrique Iglesias	I'll Never Forget You	3:10

== Charts ==
Chart (1999–2000)	Peak position
US Billboard 200	65
US Top Latin Albums (Billboard)	1
US Latin Pop Albums (Billboard)	1
US Independent Albums (Billboard)	31

== Certifications and sales ==
Region	Certification	Certified units/sales
United States (RIAA)	Gold	500,000^{^}
^{^} Shipments figures based on certification alone.

== See also ==
- List of number-one Billboard Top Latin Albums from the 1990s
- List of number-one Billboard Latin Pop Albums from the 1990s
