= List of Billboard Latin Pop Airplay number ones of 1997 =

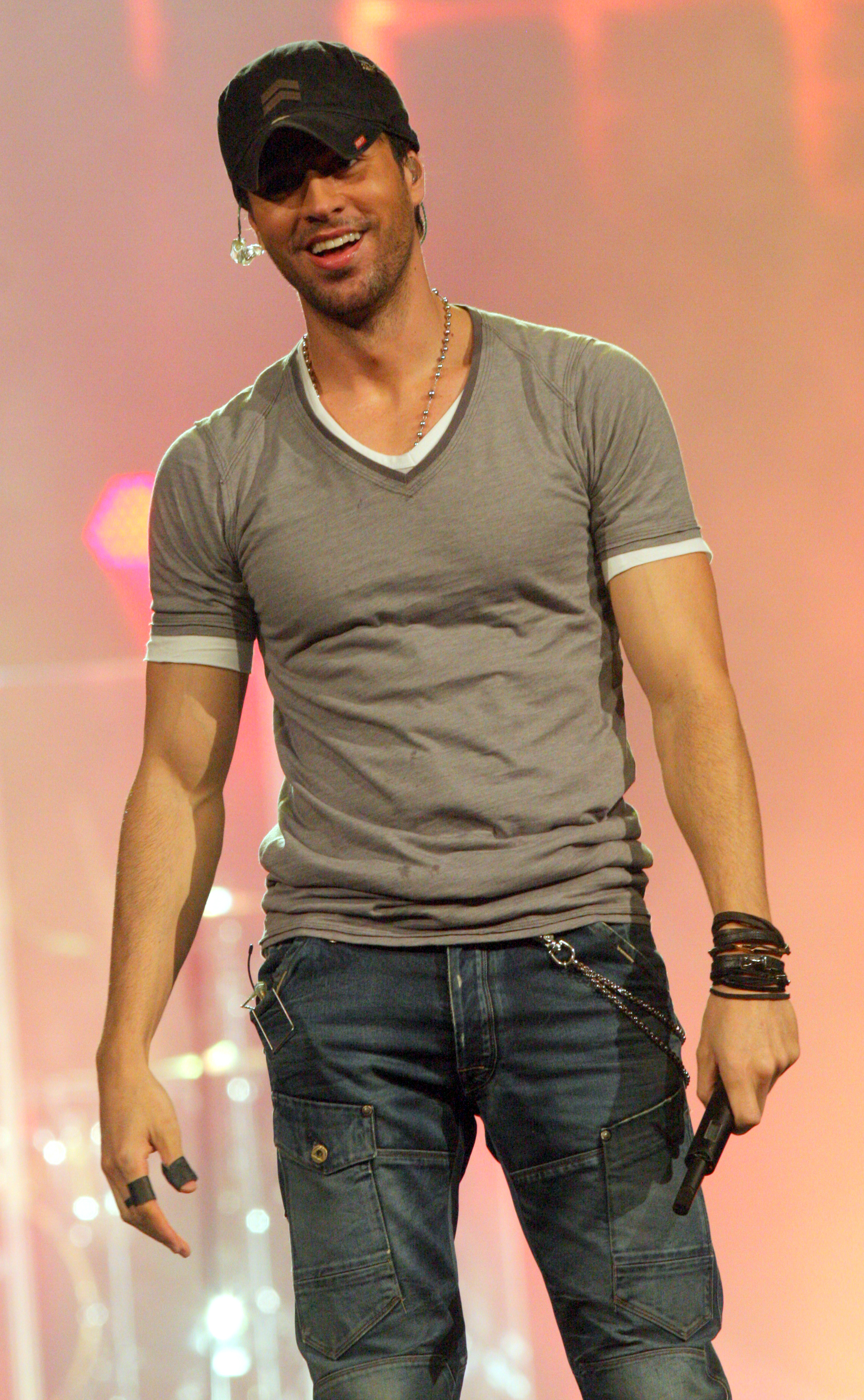
Enrique Iglesias had the most number ones in 1997 with three and the longest-running number-one song of the year with "Enamorado Por Primera Vez".

Latin Pop Airplay is a chart published by Billboard magazine that ranks the top-performing songs (regardless of genre or language) on Latin pop radio stations in the United States, based on weekly airplay data compiled by Nielsen's Broadcast Data Systems. It is a subchart of Hot Latin Songs, which lists the best-performing Spanish-language songs in the country. In 1997, 17 songs topped the chart, in 52 issues of the magazine.

The first number one of the year was "Lloviendo Flores" by Ednita Nazario, which moved into the top spot in the issue dated January 4. It remained in place for only a single week before being replaced by "Las Cosas Que Vives" by Laura Pausini which had previously topped the chart in the week ending December 28, 1996, and spent four further weeks at number one in 1997 for a total of five. Enrique Iglesias was the artist with the most number-one songs in 1997 with "Enamorado Por Primera Vez", "Sólo en Ti" (a Spanish-language adaptation of Yazoo's "Only You"), and "Miente". The former track held this position for the longest with ten weeks. Alejandro Fernández and Luis Miguel were the only other acts to have more than one chart-topper in 1997. Fernández achieved his first number one with "Si Tú Supieras" and had the final number one of the year with "En El Jardín", a duet with Gloria Estefan. Estefan herself obtained her second number one with "No Pretendo".

Luis Miguel spent a total of six weeks at number one with "Por Debajo de la Mesa" and "El Reloj", the former of which was named the best-performing song of the year. "El Reloj", "Si Tú Supieras", and Cristian Castro's "Lo Mejor de Mi" were cited by Reforma when the newspaper described 1997 as the year of the bolero due to the songs' popularity. Celine Dion recorded a Spanish-language version of Eric Carmen's "All by Myself" under the title "Sola Otra Vez" which became her first number one song on the chart. Other artists to top the chart for the first time in 1997 were Ricardo Montaner, Marta Sánchez, and Diego Torres, while Fey obtained her first and only chart-topper this year with "Azúcar Amargo".

== Chart history ==
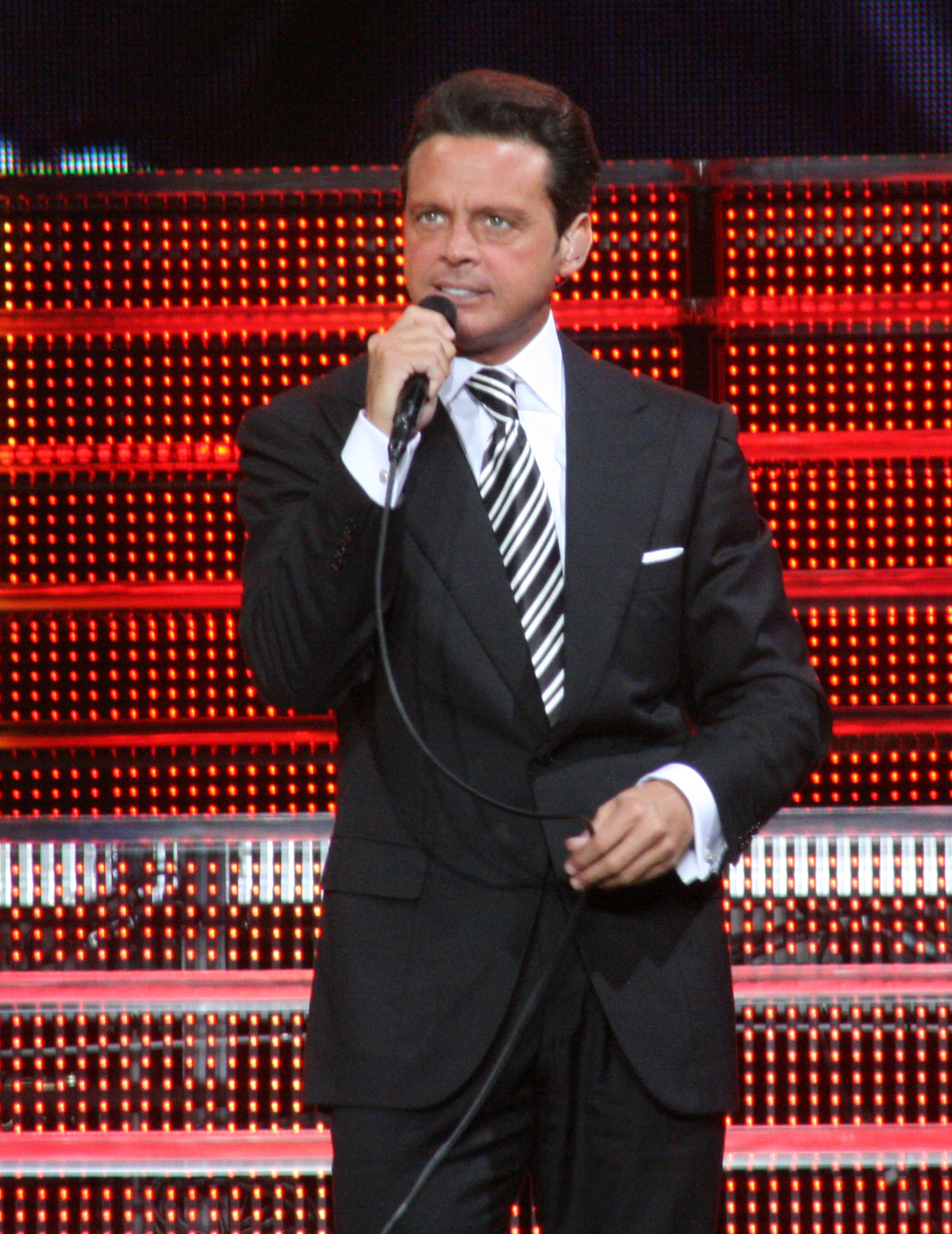
"Por Debajo de la Mesa" by Luis Miguel spent five weeks at number one and was named the best-performing song of the year on the chart by Billboard.

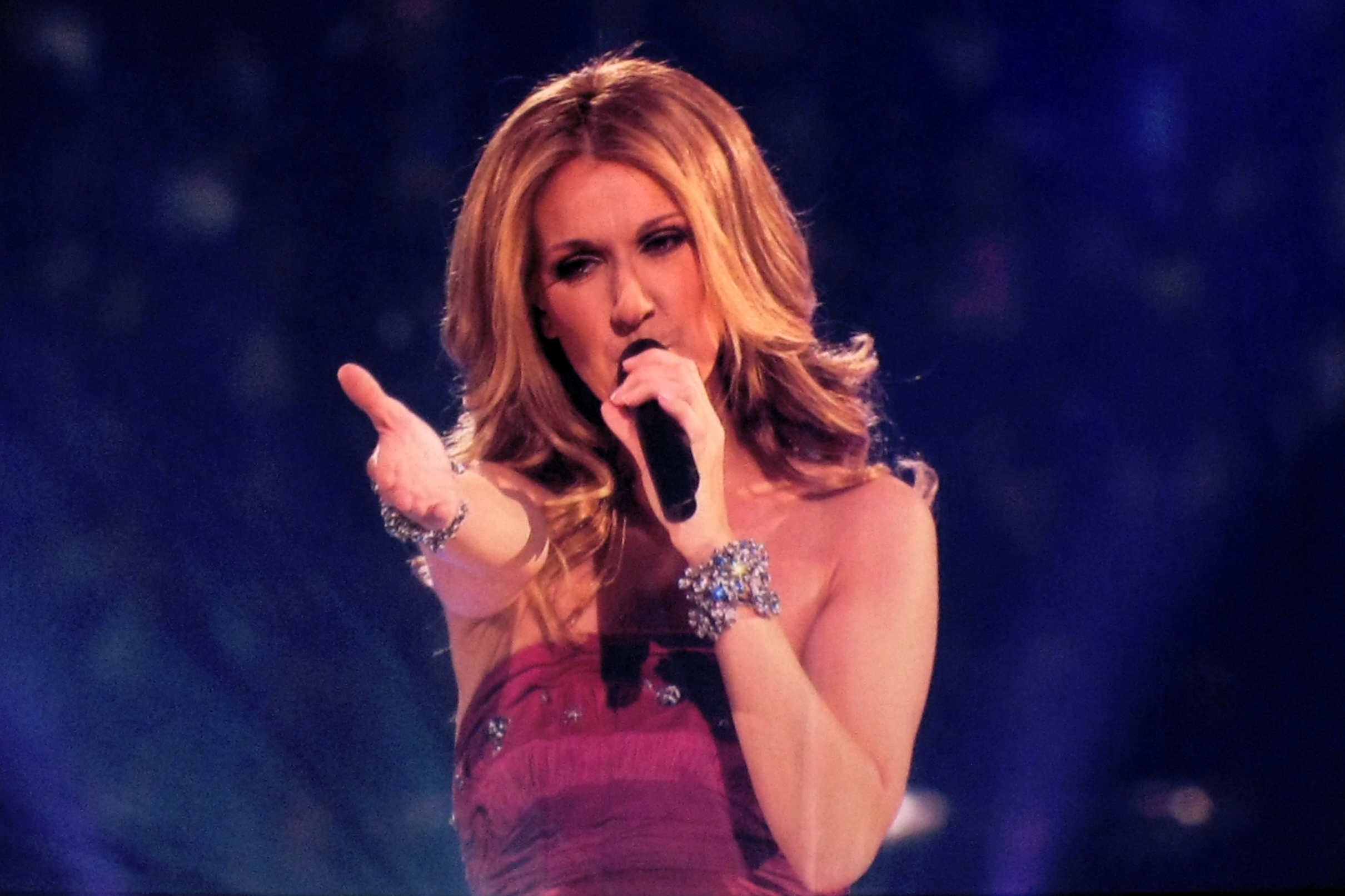
Celine Dion's Spanish-language cover version of "All by Myself" ("Sola Otra Vez") was her first song to reach number one on the Latin Pop Airplay chart.

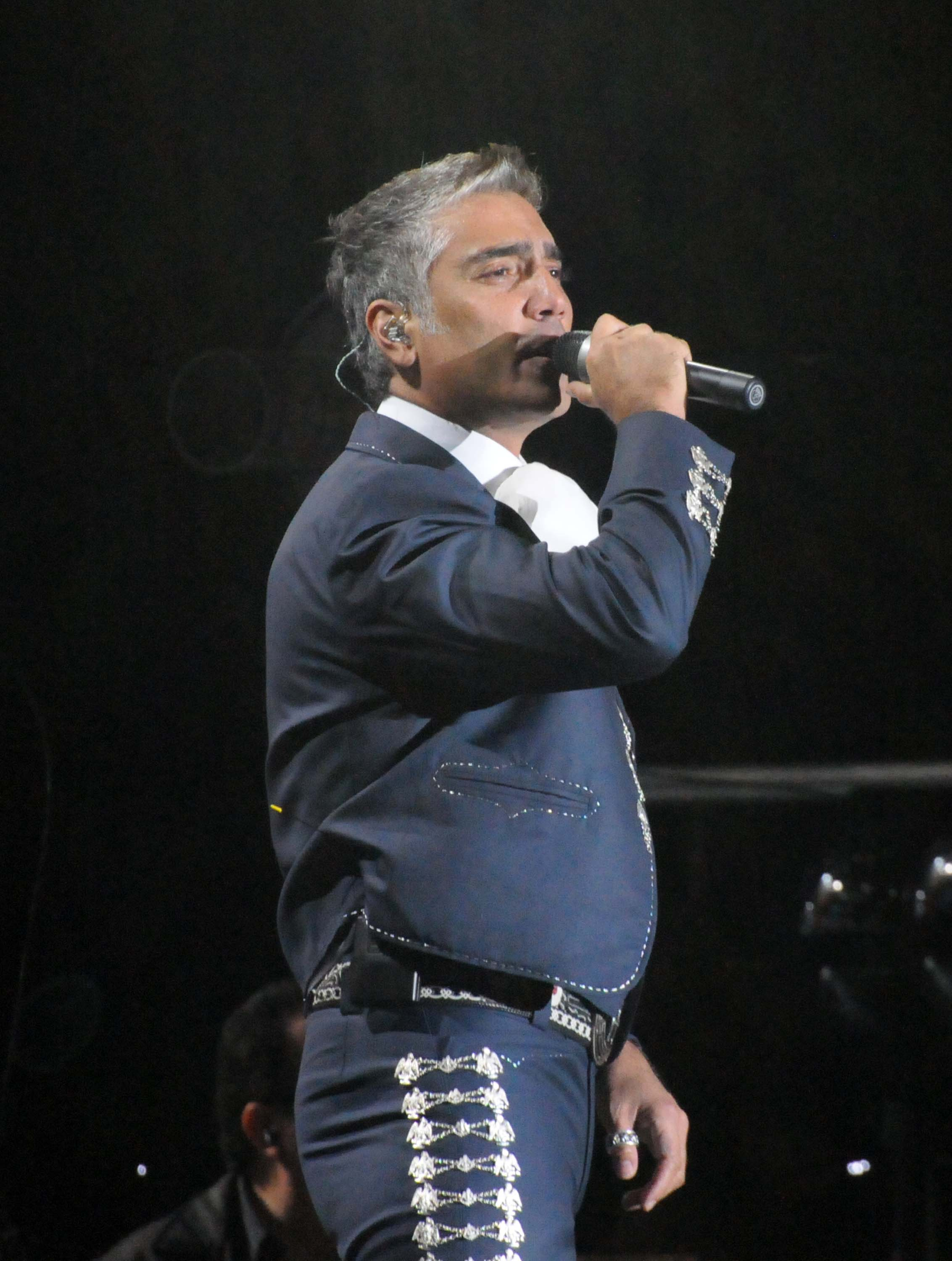
Alejandro Fernández had the final number one of the year.

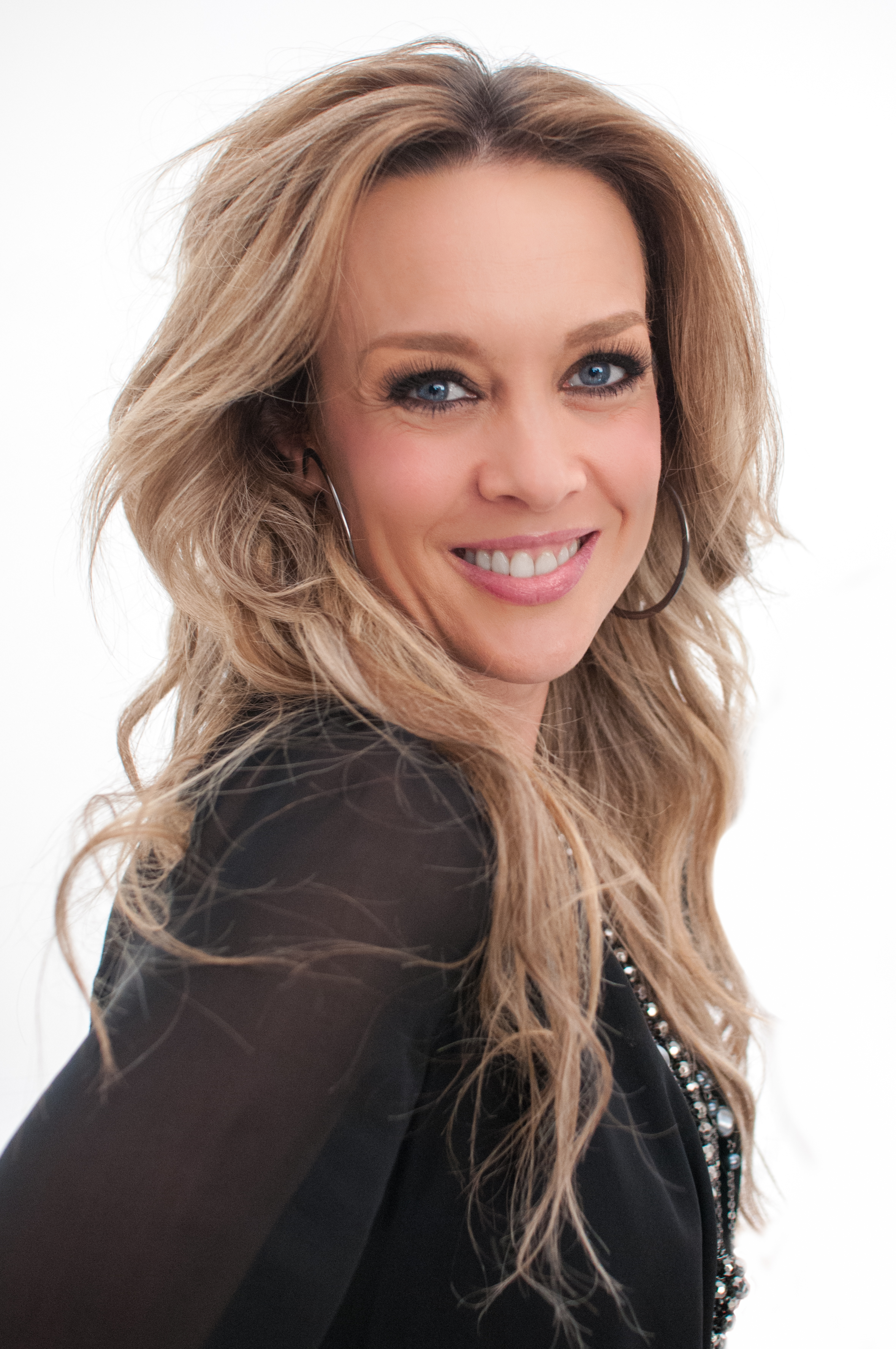
Fey obtained her only chart-topper in 1997 with "Azúcar Amargo".

Key
†	Indicates number 1 on Billboard's year-end Latin pop chart

Chart history
Issue date	Title	Artist(s)	Ref.
January 4	"Lloviendo Flores"	Ednita Nazario	
January 11	"Las Cosas Que Vives"	Laura Pausini	
January 18	"Las Cosas Que Vives"	Laura Pausini	
January 25	"Las Cosas Que Vives"	Laura Pausini	
February 1	"Las Cosas Que Vives"	Laura Pausini	
February 8	"Enamorado Por Primera Vez"	Enrique Iglesias	
February 15	"Enamorado Por Primera Vez"	Enrique Iglesias	
February 22	"Enamorado Por Primera Vez"	Enrique Iglesias	
March 1	"Enamorado Por Primera Vez"	Enrique Iglesias	
March 8	"Enamorado Por Primera Vez"	Enrique Iglesias	
March 15	"Enamorado Por Primera Vez"	Enrique Iglesias	
March 22	"Enamorado Por Primera Vez"	Enrique Iglesias	
March 29	"Enamorado Por Primera Vez"	Enrique Iglesias	
April 5	"Enamorado Por Primera Vez"	Enrique Iglesias	
April 12	"Enamorado Por Primera Vez"	Enrique Iglesias	
April 19	"Se Quiere, Se Mata"	Shakira	
April 26	"Se Quiere, Se Mata"	Shakira	
May 3	"Azúcar Amargo"	Fey	
May 10	"Sola Otra Vez"	Celine Dion	
May 17	"Sola Otra Vez"	Celine Dion	
May 24	"Sólo en Ti"	Enrique Iglesias	
May 31	"Sólo en Ti"	Enrique Iglesias	
June 7	"Sé Que Ya No Volverás"	Diego Torres	
June 14	"Moja Mi Corazón"	Marta Sánchez	
June 21	"Moja Mi Corazón"	Marta Sánchez	
June 28	"Sólo en Ti"	Enrique Iglesias	
July 5	"Sólo en Ti"	Enrique Iglesias	
July 12	"Sólo en Ti"	Enrique Iglesias	
July 19	"No Pretendo"	Gloria Estefan	
July 26	"No Pretendo"	Gloria Estefan	
August 2	"No Pretendo"	Gloria Estefan	
August 9	"Miente"	Enrique Iglesias	
August 16	"Miente"	Enrique Iglesias	
August 23	"Miente"	Enrique Iglesias	
August 30	"Por Debajo de la Mesa" †	Luis Miguel	
September 6	"Por Debajo de la Mesa" †	Luis Miguel	
September 13	"Por Debajo de la Mesa" †	Luis Miguel	
September 20	"Por Debajo de la Mesa" †	Luis Miguel	
September 27	"Por Debajo de la Mesa" †	Luis Miguel	
October 4	"Lo Mejor de Mí"	Cristian Castro	
October 11	"Lo Mejor de Mí"	Cristian Castro	
October 18	"Si Tú Supieras"	Alejandro Fernández	
October 25	"Si Tú Supieras"	Alejandro Fernández	
November 1	"Lo Mejor de Mí"	Cristian Castro	
November 8	"El Reloj"	Luis Miguel	
November 15	"Lo Mejor de Mí"	Cristian Castro	
November 22	"Lo Mejor de Mí"	Cristian Castro	
November 29	"Lo Mejor de Mí"	Cristian Castro	
December 6	"Es Así"	Ricardo Montaner	
December 13	"En El Jardín"	Alejandro Fernández featuring Gloria Estefan	
December 20	"En El Jardín"	Alejandro Fernández featuring Gloria Estefan	
December 27	"En El Jardín"	Alejandro Fernández featuring Gloria Estefan	

== See also ==
- 1997 in Latin music
