= Revolución (song) =

Single by Enrique Iglesias

from the album Vivir
- Released: 18 August 1997
- Recorded: 1995–1996
- Studio: Nadir Studios; Cinearte Studios (Madrid, Spain); New River Studios (Fort Lauderdale, Florida); Ocean Way Recording & Westlake Audio (Hollywood, California)
- Genre: Latin pop
- Length: 3:56
- Label: Fonovisa
- Songwriter: Chein García-Alonso
- Producer: Rafael Pérez-Botija

Enrique Iglesias singles chronology
"Miente" (1997)	"Revolución" (1997)	"Lluvia cae" (1997)

"Revolución" ("Revolution") is the title of the fourth single released by Spanish singer-songwriter Enrique Iglesias from his second studio album, Vivir (1997), It was released on 18 August 1997 (see 1997 in music).

== Song information ==
The track was written by Chein García-Alonso, who also wrote the No. 1 hit "Experiencia Religiosa" for Iglesias. This single became the first song released in United States not to peak at number 1 on the Billboard Hot Latin Tracks chart, breaking the string of eight consecutive number ones ("Si Tú Te Vas", "Experiencia Religiosa", "Por Amarte", "No Llores Por Mí", "Trapecista", "Enamorado Por Primera Vez", "Sólo En Tí" and "Miente").

== Chart performance ==
The track debuted on the United States Billboard Hot Latin Tracks chart at number 12 on 11 October 1997 and peaked at number 6 two weeks later on 25 October 1997.

Chart (1997)	Peak position
U.S. Billboard Hot Latin Tracks	6
U.S. Billboard Latin Pop Airplay	5
U.S. Billboard Latin Regional Mexican Airplay	7
