= Despertar =

Despertar is Spanish for "to wake". It may refer to:

- Despertar, an anarchist weekly in Ceuta from 1931 to 1932, the official organ of the Confederación Nacional del Trabajo
- "Despertar", a 2020 single released by Estopa and Amaral

== See also ==
- Al Despertar (disambiguation)
