= Cosas del Amor (Enrique Iglesias album) =

1998 studio album by Enrique Iglesias

Studio album by Enrique Iglesias
- Released: September 22, 1998
- Recorded: 1997–1998
- Studios: Unique Recording Studios (New York City, New York U.S.); Andora Studios; Ocean Way Recording Studios (Los Angeles, California, U.S.); Nadir Studios (Madrid, Spain); TGN Studios (Munich, Germany)
- Genres: Latin pop; latin ballad
- Length: 45:34
- Language: Spanish
- Label: Fonovisa
- Producer: Rafael Pérez-Botija

Enrique Iglesias chronology
Remixes (1998)	Cosas del Amor (1998)	Bailamos Greatest Hits (1999)

Singles from Cosas del Amor
- 1. "Esperanza" Released: July 27, 1998; 2. "Nunca Te Olvidaré" Released: November 16, 1998

Professional ratings
Review scores
Source	Rating
Allmusic	2.5/5 stars

Cosas del Amor (English: Things of Love) is the third Spanish studio album recorded by the Spanish singer-songwriter Enrique Iglesias, The album witch released by Fonovisa Records on September 22, 1998 (see 1998 in music). The album was produced again by Spanish songwriter and record producer Rafael Pérez-Botija, taking a more mature direction on the production of the album, departing from the pop rock ballads of his first two albums and focusing on Latin pop arrangements similar to the likes of Luis Miguel.

== Release and reception ==
In 1999, the album received a nomination for Best Latin Pop Performance at the 41st Annual Grammy Awards, losing to Vuelve (1998) by Puerto Rican-American recording artist Ricky Martin. It yielded two number-one singles on the Billboard Hot Latin Tracks chart: "Esperanza" and "Nunca Te Olvidaré". The third single was cancelled in favor of his first English language hit single "Bailamos". The album debuted at number-one in the Billboard Top Latin Albums chart in the week of October 10, 1998, staying at pole position for five weeks in 1998 and three weeks in 1999. In the Billboard 200, the album debuted and peaked at #64 with 21,500 copies sold, the highest debut by a Latin language album since Luis Miguel's Romances. In its third week at the charts it sold 15,000. The album was certified Gold by Recording Industry Association of America in 1999.

== Track listing ==
Standard edition
No.	Title	Writer(s)	Translation	Length
1.	"Nunca Te Olvidaré"	Enrique Iglesias	I'll Never Forget You	4:24
2.	"Cosas Del Amor"	Rafael Pérez-Botija · María Enriqueta Ramos Núñez	Things Of Love	4:28
3.	"Esperanza"	Enrique Iglesias · Chein García-Alonso	Hope	3:11
4.	"Desnudo"	Rafael Pérez-Botija · María Enriqueta Ramos Núñez	Naked	5:38
5.	"Contigo"	Enrique Iglesias	With You	5:18
6.	"Alguien Cómo Tú"	Enrique Iglesias	Someone Like You	4:50
7.	"Sirena"	Rafael Pérez-Botija · María Enriqueta Ramos Núñez	Mermaid	5:01
8.	"Para De Jugar"	Enrique Iglesias	Stop Playing	5:03
9.	"Dicen Por Ahí"	Mario Martinelli · Enrique Iglesias	Rumour Has It	3:51
10.	"Ruleta Rusa"	Rafael Pérez-Botija · María Enriqueta Ramos Núñez	Russian Roulette	4:16

Limited edition
No.	Title	Writer(s)	Translation	Length
1.	"Bailamos" (Groove Brothers Mix)	Paul Barry · Mark Taylor	We Dance	5:08
2.	"Muñeca Cruel" (Latin Dance Mix)	Rafael Pérez-Botija	Cruel Twist	4:20
3.	"Sólo En Tí" (Remix)	Vince Clarke · Enrique Iglesias	Only You	3:29
4.	"Miente" (Remix)	Rafael Pérez-Botija	Lies	3:42
5.	"Si Tú Te Vas" (Remix)	Enrique Iglesias · Roberto Morales	If You Are Going	4:29
6.	"Nunca Te Olvidaré"	Enrique Iglesias	I'll Never Forget	4:24
7.	"Cosas Del Amor"	Rafael Pérez-Botija · María Enriqueta Ramos Núñez	Things Of Love	4:28
8.	"Esperanza"	Enrique Iglesias · Chein García-Alonso	Hope	3:11
9.	"Desnudo"	Rafael Pérez-Botija · María Enriqueta Ramos Núñez	Naked	5:38
10.	"Contigo"	Enrique Iglesias	With You	5:18
11.	"Alguien Cómo Tú"	Enrique Iglesias	Someone Like You	4:50
12.	"Sirena"	Rafael Pérez-Botija · María Enriqueta Ramos Núñez	Siren	4:59
13.	"Para De Jugar"	Enrique Iglesias	Stop Playing	5:03
14.	"Dicen Por Ahí"	Mario Martinelli · Enrique Iglesias	Rumour Has It	3:49
15.	"Ruleta Rusa"	Rafael Pérez-Botija · María Enriqueta Ramos Núñez	Russian Roulette	4:16
16.	"Bailamos"	Paul Barry · Mark Taylor	We Dance	3:40
17.	"Bailamos" (Groove Brothers Instrumental)	Paul Barry · Mark Taylor	We Dance	5:07

== Charts ==
Chart (1998–2000)	Peak position
Dutch Albums (Album Top 100)	25
Finnish Albums (Suomen virallinen lista)	37
French Albums (SNEP)	60
Hungarian Albums (MAHASZ)	15
Norwegian Albums (VG-lista)	21
Swedish Albums (Sverigetopplistan)	27
Swiss Albums (Schweizer Hitparade)	16
US Billboard 200	64
US Top Latin Albums (Billboard)	1
US Latin Pop Albums (Billboard)	1

== Certifications and sales ==
Region	Certification	Certified units/sales
Argentina	—	350,000
Brazil	—	70,000
Chile	Platinum	
Mexico (AMPROFON)	Platinum	250,000^{^}
Peru	Gold	
Spain (Promusicae)	Platinum	100,000
United States (RIAA)	Gold	500,000^{^}
Uruguay (CUD)	2× Platinum	12,000^{^}
^{^} Shipments figures based on certification alone.

== See also ==
- List of number-one Billboard Top Latin Albums from the 1990s
- List of number-one Billboard Latin Pop Albums from the 1990s
