= Enrique Iglesias (disambiguation) =

Enrique Iglesias (born 1975) is a Spanish singer.

Enrique Iglesias may also refer to:

- Enrique Iglesias (album), 1995 album by the singer
- Enrique Iglesias: 95/08 Éxitos, 2008 compilation album by the singer
- Enrique V. Iglesias (born 1930), Uruguayan economist
