= List of number-one Billboard Regional Mexican Songs of 1997 =

The Billboard Regional Mexican Songs chart ranks the best-performing Regional Mexican singles in the United States. Published weekly by Billboard magazine, it ranks the "most popular regional Mexican songs, ranked by radio airplay audience impressions as measured by Nielsen Music."

== Chart history ==
Key
†	Indicates number 1 on Billboard's year-end regional Mexican chart

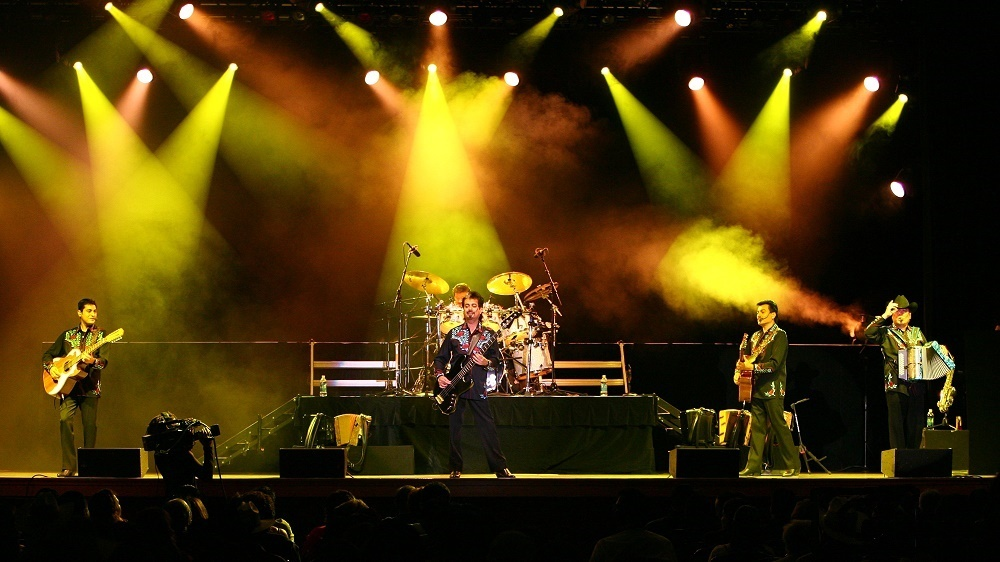
Norteño group Los Tigres del Norte earned four number-one songs in 1997.

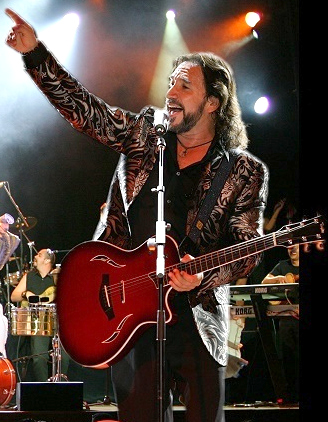
Singer-songwriter Marco Antonio Solís earned three number-one songs in 1997.

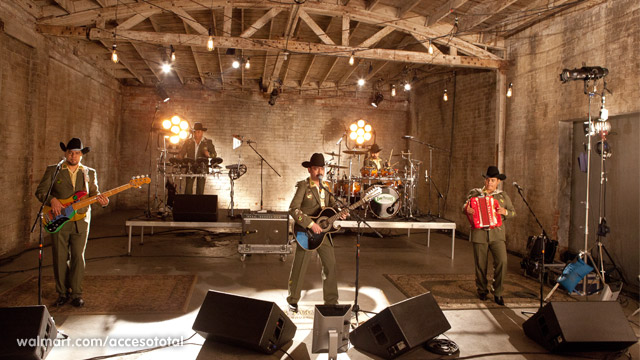
Norteño group Los Tucanes de Tijuana earned two number-one songs in 1997.

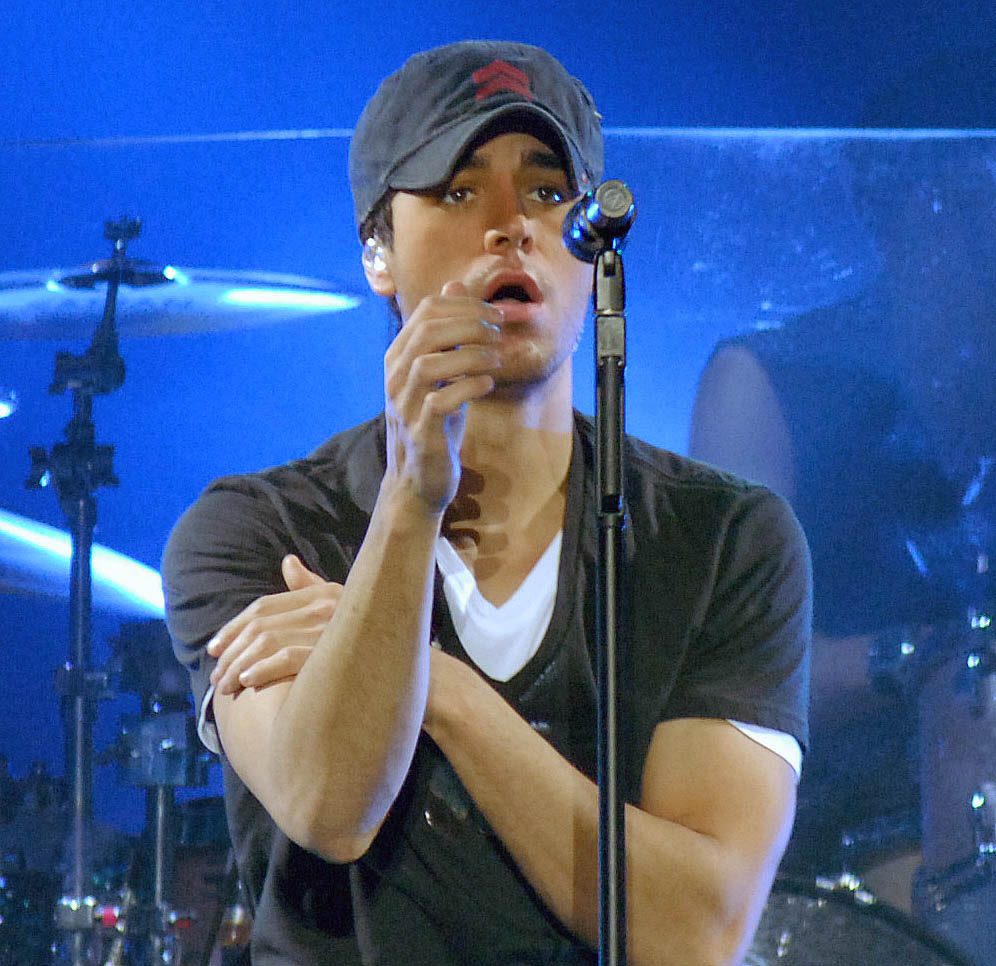
Despite it not being a Regional Mexican song and the singer not being Mexican, "Enamorado por primera vez" by Enrique Iglesias topped the chart for five weeks.

Issue date	Song	Artist(s)	Ref.
January 4	"No pude enamorarme más"	Los Tigres del Norte	
January 11	"No pude enamorarme más"	Los Tigres del Norte	
January 18	"Así como te conocí"	Marco Antonio Solís	
January 25	"No pude enamorarme más"	Los Tigres del Norte	
February 1	"No pude enamorarme más"	Los Tigres del Norte	
February 8	"Enamorado por primera vez"	Enrique Iglesias	
February 15	"Enamorado por primera vez"	Enrique Iglesias	
February 22	"Enamorado por primera vez"	Enrique Iglesias	
March 1	"Juguete"	Grupo Límite	
March 8	"Juguete"	Grupo Límite	
March 15	"Enamorado por primera vez"	Enrique Iglesias	
March 22	"Enamorado por primera vez"	Enrique Iglesias	
March 29	"Ya me voy para siempre" †	Los Temerarios	
April 5	"Ya me voy para siempre" †	Los Temerarios	
April 12	"Ya me voy para siempre" †	Los Temerarios	
April 19	"Ya me voy para siempre" †	Los Temerarios	
April 26	"Ya me voy para siempre" †	Los Temerarios	
May 3	"Mi sangre prisionera"	Los Tigres del Norte	
May 10	"Mi sangre prisionera"	Los Tigres del Norte	
May 17	"Mi sangre prisionera"	Los Tigres del Norte	
May 24	"Unidos para siempre"	Los Tigres del Norte	
May 31	"Ya me voy para siempre" †	Los Temerarios	
June 7	"Ya me voy para siempre" †	Los Temerarios	
June 14	"Ya me voy para siempre" †	Los Temerarios	
June 21	"Ya me voy para siempre" †	Los Temerarios	
June 28	"El mojado acaudalado"	Los Tigres del Norte	
July 5	"El mojado acaudalado"	Los Tigres del Norte	
July 12	"El mojado acaudalado"	Los Tigres del Norte	
July 19	"El mojado acaudalado"	Los Tigres del Norte	
July 26	"El mojado acaudalado"	Los Tigres del Norte	
August 2	"El Tucanazo"	Los Tucanes de Tijuana	
August 9	"El Tucanazo"	Los Tucanes de Tijuana	
August 16	"El Tucanazo"	Los Tucanes de Tijuana	
August 23	"El Tucanazo"	Los Tucanes de Tijuana	
August 30	"Vivir sin ellas"	Intocable	
September 6	"Mi último adiós"	Marco Antonio Solís	
September 13	"Mi último adiós"	Marco Antonio Solís	
September 20	"Mi último adiós"	Marco Antonio Solís	
September 27	"Mi último adiós"	Marco Antonio Solís	
October 4	"Es verdad"	Los Tucanes de Tijuana	
October 11	"La Venia bendita"	Marco Antonio Solís	
October 18	"La Venia bendita"	Marco Antonio Solís	
October 25	"La Venia bendita"	Marco Antonio Solís	
November 1	"La Venia bendita"	Marco Antonio Solís	
November 8	"La Venia bendita"	Marco Antonio Solís	
November 15	"La Venia bendita"	Marco Antonio Solís	
November 22	"La Venia bendita"	Marco Antonio Solís	
November 29	"La Venia bendita"	Marco Antonio Solís	
December 6	"La Venia bendita"	Marco Antonio Solís	
December 13	"La Venia bendita"	Marco Antonio Solís	
December 20	"La Venia bendita"	Marco Antonio Solís	
December 27	"La Venia bendita"	Marco Antonio Solís	
