= Miente =

Single by Enrique Iglesias

from the album Vivir
- Released: 1997
- Studio: Cinearte, Madrid, Spain; Estudios Nadir, Madrid, Spain; Image Recording, Hollywood, California; New River, Fort Lauderdale, FL; Ocean Way Recording, Hollywood, California; Westlake, Hollywood, California
- Genre: Pop
- Length: 3:34
- Label: Fonovisa
- Songwriter: Rafael Pérez-Botija
- Producer: Rafael Pérez-Botija

Enrique Iglesias singles chronology
"Sólo en Tí" (1997)	"Miente" (1997)	"Revolución" (1997)

"Miente" (English: "Lie") is a song by Spanish singer Enrique Iglesias from his second studio album, Vivir (1997). The song was written and produced by Rafael Pérez-Botija. It was released as the third single from the album in 1997. An uptempo pop power ballad backed by a piano and percussion, the song deals with the singer being in denial about a relationship ending.

"Miente" was covered by Robert Avellanet on his debut studio album, Sentir (1999), as a salsa track. The music video for the cover features the singer playing billiards while a woman is driving away. Avellanet's version peaked at numbers 23 and 9 on the Hot Latin Songs and Tropical Airplay charts, respectively, and was a recipient of the ASCAP Latin Award on the salsa field in 2000. "Miente" received positive reactions from three music journalists, who generally considered it was one of the best tracks from Vivir. Commercially, the original song topped the Billboard Hot Latin Songs and Latin Pop Airplay charts in the United States.

== Background and composition ==
In 1995, Iglesias released his eponymous debut album, which sold over 4.7 million copies worldwide and had five of its singles reach number one on the Billboard Hot Latin Songs in the United States. In August 1996, El Informador reported that Iglesias was working on a follow-up album and it would be released in January the following year. The album's title of Vivir was revealed by Iglesias in December 1995, before it was eventually released on 28 January 1997. He also announced that the album was produced by Rafael Pérez-Botija and he had co-written its tracks with Roberto Morales. One of the three tracks Pérez-Botija composed for the album was "Miente", a "dramatic" uptempo pop power ballad, that is backed by a piano and percussion. Lyrically, the song deals with the singer sensing "the end but being so love addicted, he goes into denial."

== Promotion and reception ==
"Miente" was released as the third single from Vivir in 1997. The song was later included on Iglesias' compilation albums The Best Hits (1999) and the deluxe edition of Enrique Iglesias: 95/08 Éxitos (2008). A remix version of the song was included on his album Remixes (1998). "Miente" was covered by Puerto Rican singer Robert Avellanet for his debut studio album Sentir (1999). Avellanet's rendition was recorded as a salsa track and produced by Isidro Infante. The cover received the ASCAP Latin Award on the salsa field in 2000. A music video was filmed for the cover version which the features Avellanet performing at a bar and playing billiards while a woman is driving away. Joey Guerra of the Houston Chronicle regarded "Miente" as "one of the strongest tracks" from Vivir. Similarly, the San Antonio Express-News editor Ramiro Burr felt the song to be the album's "best cut" while Howard Cohen on the Miami Herald called it "terrific". In the US, "Miente" debuted at number five on the Billboard Hot Latin Songs chart on the week of 5 August 1997 and topped the chart a week later; it spent four weeks at this position. The track also reached the top of the Latin Pop Airplay chart, at which it spent three weeks. Avellanet's version peaked at numbers 23 and 9 on the Hot Latin Songs and Tropical Airplay charts, respectively.

== Charts ==
=== Weekly charts ===
Weekly chart positions for "Miente"
Chart (1997)	Peak position
US Hot Latin Songs (Billboard)	1
US Latin Pop Airplay (Billboard)	1

=== Year-end charts ===
1997 year-end chart performance for "Miente"
Chart (1997)	Position
US Hot Latin Songs (Billboard)	16
US Latin Pop Airplay (Billboard)	14

== See also ==
- List of number-one Billboard Hot Latin Tracks of 1997
- List of Billboard Latin Pop Airplay number ones of 1997
