= Vivir (album) =

1997 studio album by Enrique Iglesias

Studio album by Enrique Iglesias
- Released: January 21, 1997
- Recorded: August - December 1996
- Studio: Nadir Studios; Cinearte Studios (Madrid, Spain); New River Studios (Fort Lauderdale, Florida, U.S.); Ocean Way Recording Studios; Westlake Audio (Hollywood, California, U.S.)
- Genre: Latin pop; dance-pop; soft rock; latin ballad
- Length: 41:11
- Language: Spanish
- Label: Fonovisa
- Producer: Rafael Pérez-Botija

Enrique Iglesias chronology
Enrique Iglesias (1995)	Vivir (1997)	Remixes (1998)

Singles from Vivir
- 1. "Enamorado Por Primera Vez" Released: November 25, 1996; 2. "Sólo En Tí" Released: March 17, 1997; 3. "Volveré" Released: May 12, 1997; 4. "Miente" Released: June 9, 1997; 5. "Revolución" Released: July 21, 1997; 6. "Lluvia cae" Released: September 15, 1997; 7. "Al Despertar" Released: November 10, 1997; 8. "Viviré y Moriré" Released: January 5, 1998

Professional ratings
Review scores
Source	Rating
Allmusic	5/5 stars
Los Angeles Times	5/5 stars

Vivir (English: Live) is the second Spanish studio album recorded by the Spanish singer-songwriter Enrique Iglesias. The album witch released by Fonovisa Records on January 21, 1997 (see 1997 in music). The album includes three number-one singles on the Billboard Hot Latin Tracks charts in United States: "Enamorado Por Primera Vez", "Sólo En Tí" and "Miente". In the United States, it was platinum on May 6, 1997. This album received a nomination for Grammy Award for Best Latin Pop Album at the 40th Annual Grammy Awards, held on Wednesday February 25, 1998, losing to Romances (1997) by Luis Miguel. The album received a Premio Lo Nuestro award for "Pop Album of the Year" at the 9th Lo Nuestro Awards. To date, the record has sold one million copies in the U.S and over 5 million copies worldwide.

== Commercial performance ==
The album debuted in the Billboard Top Latin Albums chart at number 1 in the week of 15 February 1997, dethroning his own father Julio Iglesias with the album Tango, and spent eight weeks at pole position, until Selena's Dreaming of You took the number-one spot for two weeks. Enrique Iglesias with his debut album replaced Selena's album at number-one the year before. In the week of 26 April 1997 Vivir returned to the top spot for another three weeks at the summit. The album spent 15 non-consecutive weeks at pole position, it also spent 36 weeks inside the Top Ten and 69 weeks in the chart, selling 5 million copies worldwide. The album's first three singles achieved 26 weeks at the top of the "Hot Latin Tracks" of Billboard in 1997, an astonishing feat that hasn't been matched yet by any other artist.

== Track listing ==
No.	Title	Writer(s)	Translation	Length
1.	"Enamorado Por Primera Vez"	Enrique Iglesias	In Love for the First Time	4:29
2.	"Al Despertar"	Enrique Iglesias; Roberto Morales	Upon Awakening	4:16
3.	"Lluvia cae"	Enrique Iglesias; Rafael Pérez-Botija	Rainfall	4:36
4.	"Tu Vacío"	Rafael Pérez-Botija; María Enriqueta Ramos Núñez	Your Emptiness	3:55
5.	"Sólo En Tí" (Only You)	Vince Clarke · Adapt: Spanish: Enrique Iglesias	Only You	3:28
6.	"Miente"	Rafael Pérez-Botija; María Enriqueta Ramos Núñez	Lie	3:36
7.	"Viviré y Moriré"	Enrique Iglesias	I'll Live and I'll Die	4:04
8.	"Volveré"	Enrique Iglesias; Roberto Morales	I'll return	4:38
9.	"El Muro"	Rafael Pérez-Botija; María Enriqueta Ramos Núñez	The Wall	4:15
10.	"Revolución"	Chein García-Alonso	Revolution	4:00
Total length:				41:11

== Personnel ==
- Christina Abaroa - producer, production coordination
- Jeff DeMorris - assistant engineer, mixing assistant
- Mike Dy - assistant engineer, mixing assistant
- Cristin Allen Goetz - production coordination
- Brad Kinnek - backing vocals, engineer, assistant engineer, mixing assistant
- Chris Lord-Alge - mixing
- Michael Parnin - assistant engineer, mixing assistant
- Tony DeFranco - mixing coordinator
- Antonio Olariaga - transfers, digital transfers
- Chein García-Alonso - adaptation
- Doug Sax - mastering
- Andrew Sheeps - digital editing
- Miguel Ángel Cuberto - transfers
- Fernando Martínez - management
- Roberto Morales - advisor, music assistant
- Steven Lippman - photography
- Erin Flanagan - stylist
- Manolo Ruiz - stylist
- John Coulter - design
- Rafael Pérez-Botija - piano, arranger, keyboards, producer
- Enrique Iglesias - vocals, backing vocals
- Luis Conte - percussion
- Gregg Bissonette - drums
- Neal Avron - engineer, drums
- Bob Painter - keyboards, programming, vocals, engineer
- Mitchel Forman - piano
- Gary Grant - trumpet
- Jerry Hey - trumpet
- Paulinho Da Costa - percussion
- Michael Landau - guitar
- Neil Stubenhaus - bass
- Arturo Velasco - trombone
- Dan Higgins - saxophone
- Leland Sklar - bass
- Billy Preston - Hammond organ
- Bill Reichenbach Jr. - trombone
- Charmain Renata - Hubbard Vocals, Choir, Chorus
- Ron Marshall - vocals, choir, chorus
- Sarah Anindo Marshall - vocals, choir master
- Steve Sykes - guitar, backing vocals, engineer
- Ayo Adeyemi - vocals, choir, chorus
- Malang Bayo - vocals, choir, chorus
- Patricio Castillo - backing vocals
- María Del Rey - backing vocals, contractor
- Dennis Hetzendorfer - engineer
- Carlos Murguía - backing vocals
- Dan Navarro - backing vocals
- Kenny O'Brien - backing vocals
- Terry Wood - backing vocals
- Gisa Vatcky - backing vocals
- Elhadj Malick Sow - vocals, choir, chorus
- Brad Kinney - backing vocals
- Eric Ratz - vocals, engineer

== Charts ==
Chart (1997/1998)	Peak position
Australian Albums (ARIA)	167
European Top 100 Albums (Music & Media)	39
US Billboard Top 200 Albums	33
US Billboard Top Latin Albums	1
US Billboard Latin Pop Albums	1

== Certifications and sales ==
Region	Certification	Certified units/sales
Argentina	—	294,000
Brazil (Pro-Música Brasil)	Gold	120,000
Central America (CFC)	Diamond	100,000
Mexico (AMPROFON)	Diamond	1,000,000^{^}
Spain (Promusicae)	2× Platinum	200,000^{^}
Taiwan (RIT)	Platinum	
United States (RIAA)	Platinum	1,000,000^{^}
Summaries
Worldwide	—	5,000,000
^{^} Shipments figures based on certification alone.

== See also ==
- 1997 in Latin music
- List of number-one Billboard Top Latin Albums from the 1990s
- List of best-selling Latin albums
