= Enamorado Por Primera Vez =

Single by Enrique Iglesias

from the album Vivir
- Released: 18 January 1997
- Studio: Cinearte, Madrid, Spain; Nadir, Madrid, Spain; Image Recording, Hollywood, California; New River, Fort Lauderdale, FL; Ocean Way, Hollywood, California; Westlake, Hollywood, California
- Genre: Pop
- Length: 4:28
- Label: Fonovisa
- Songwriter: Enrique Iglesias
- Producer: Rafael Pérez-Botija

Enrique Iglesias singles chronology
"Trapecista" (1996)	"Enamorado Por Primera Vez" (1997)	"Sólo en Tí" (1997)

Music video
- "Enamorado Por Primera Vez" on YouTube

"Enamorado Por Primera Vez" (English: "In Love For the First Time") is a song by Spanish singer Enrique Iglesias from his second studio album, Vivir (1997). The song was written by Iglesias and produced by Rafael Pérez-Botija. It was released as the lead single from the album on 18 January 1997. A pop power ballad which he wrote when he was 18, the song is about the singer feeling like he is falling in love for the first time again. The song received positive reactions from three music journalists, although one critic wrote an unfavorable review of it.

The song was a recipient of an ASCAP Latin Award in 1998. Commercially, it debuted on top of the US Billboard Hot Latin Songs chart, spending 12 weeks on this position. The song also reached number one on the Billboard Latin Pop Airplay and Regional Mexican Airplay genre charts. On the year-end charts, it ended at the fourth and second positions on the Hot Latin Songs and Latin Pop Airplay charts, respectively. The music video for "Enamorado Por Primera Vez" features Iglesias and a band performing the song and intersperses scenes with a woman in a bedroom.

== Background and composition ==
In 1995, Iglesias released his eponymous debut album, which sold over 4.7 million copies worldwide and had five of its singles reach number one on the Billboard Hot Latin Songs in the US. In August 1996, El Informador reported that Iglesias was working on a follow-up album and it would be released in January the following year. The album's title of Vivir was revealed by Iglesias in December 1996, before it was eventually released on 28 January 1997. He also announced that the album was produced by Rafael Pérez-Botija and he had co-written its tracks with Roberto Morales. One of the songs Iglesias solely composed for Vivir was "Enamorado Por Primera Vez", which he penned when he was 18; it is a pop power ballad that features a guitar solo. Iglesias clarified that the song is not about falling in love for the first time, but rather "about the feelings one gets when they fall in love" and added: "It's always the same feeling. Each time you fall in love, it seems like the first time." The song was originally intended to be recorded for Enrique Iglesias, but Iglesias decided to hold it off until Vivir.

== Promotion and reception ==
"Enamorado Por Primera Vez" was released as the lead single from the album on 18 January 1997. "Enamorado Por Primera Vez" was later included on Iglesias' compilation albums The Best Hits (1999) and Enrique Iglesias: 95/08 Éxitos (2008). A music video for the song was filmed which features Iglesias performing it with a band being interspersed with a woman in a bedroom. Writing for the San Antonio Express-News, Ramiro Burr remarked that the song has a "slow acoustic beginning before building with catchy choruses". La Prensa de San Antonio editor Diana Raquel called it a "beautiful ballad". Los 40 editor Noemi Fernández listed it as one of Iglesias' ten best songs. Mario Tarradell of the Houston Chronicle criticized the track as "empty, as innocuous as most of the hits from his career-launching release".

The track was recognized as one of the best-performing songs of the year on the Pop/Ballad field at the 1998 ASCAP Latin Awards. In the US, "Enamorado Por Primera Vez" debuted on top of the Hot Latin Songs chart, making it Iglesias's sixth number one song on the chart as well as the second song in the chart's history to debut at number one after "El Palo" by Juan Gabriel; the song spent 12 weeks on this position. The song also topped the Latin Pop Airplay and Regional Mexican Airplay genre charts, spending 11 weeks at the top of on this spot on the former chart, the longest-running number one song of the year. On the year-end charts, "Enamorado Por Primera Vez" ended 1997 as the fourth best-performing song of 1997 on the Hot Latin Songs chart and the second best-performing song on the Latin Pop Airplay chart after "Por Debajo de la Mesa" by Luis Miguel.

== Charts ==
=== Weekly charts ===
Weekly chart positions for "Enamorado Por Primera Vez"
Chart (1997)	Peak position
US Hot Latin Songs (Billboard)	1
US Latin Pop Airplay (Billboard)	1
US Regional Mexican Airplay (Billboard)	1

=== Year-end charts ===
1997 year-end chart performance for "Enamorado Por Primera Vez"
Chart (1997)	Position
US Hot Latin Songs (Billboard)	4
US Latin Pop Airplay (Billboard)	2
US Regional Mexican Airplay (Billboard)	9

== See also ==
- Billboard Hot Latin Songs Year-End Chart
- List of number-one Billboard Hot Latin Tracks of 1997
- List of Billboard Latin Pop Airplay number ones of 1997
- List of number-one Billboard Regional Mexican Songs of 1997
