= El reloj =

Song with music and lyrics by Roberto Cantoral

Song by Los Tres Caballeros
- Released: 1957
- Genre: bolero
- Composer: Roberto Cantoral

"El Reloj"

Single by Luis Miguel

from the album Romances
- Released: 1997
- Recorded: 1997
- Genre: bolero
- Length: 3:02
- Label: WEA Latina
- Songwriter: Roberto Cantoral
- Producer: Luis Miguel

Luis Miguel singles chronology
"Por Debajo de la Mesa" (1997)	"El Reloj" (1997)	"Contigo (Estar Contigo)" (1998)

"El reloj" (lit. 'The clock') is a song of the bolero genre, with music and lyrics by Mexican composer and singer Roberto Cantoral, then a member of the Los Tres Caballeros trio.

== History ==
Cantoral composed the song in 1956, in Washington D.C., in front of the Potomac River, at the end of a Los Tres Caballeros tour of the United States. During the tour he had had an affair with one of the girls participating in the show, who was to return to New York the next morning. This love episode, and the presence of a lounge clock during their last meeting, were the events that inspired Cantoral, who would soon turn the relatively trivial episode into the story of a deep love.

Los Tres Caballeros premiered the song in 1957 and it was an immediate success. The following year it was recorded by trio Los Panchos in 1958. Since then, it has been interpreted by countless artists, in several languages. Lines from the song feature in a scene from the biographical film Selena in which Abraham Quintanilla teaches them to his daughter, Selena, by way of introducing her to the Mexican side of her Chicano heritage.

== Interpreters of "El reloj" ==
Spanish version
- José José
- Il Volo
- Juan d'Arienzo
- José Feliciano
- Alejandro Fernández
- Lucho Gatica (Latin Grammy Hall of Fame inductee)
- Luis Miguel (#2 Hot Latin Tracks, #1 Latin Pop Airplay; recipient of the BMI Latin Award in 1999)
- Los Panchos
- Neil Sedaka
- es:Jorge Valdez
- French Latino

Japanese version
- Chiemi Eri
- Graciela Susana
- ja:Teruhiko Aoi
- ja:Jun Anna
- ja:Yoichi Sugawara
- ja:Hiroshi Mizuhara

== See also ==
- List of Billboard Latin Pop Airplay number ones of 1997
