= Al Despertar =

Al Despertar may refer to:

- Al Despertar (Enrique Iglesias song)
- Al Despertar (Mercedes Sosa song)
- Al Despertar (album), a 1998 album by Mercedes Sosa
