= ¿Dónde Están Corazón? =

Single by Enrique Iglesias

from the album Enrique Iglesias: 95/08 Exitos
- Released: 21 January 2008
- Recorded: 2007
- Genre: Latin pop; soft rock
- Length: 4:10
- Label: Universal Music Latino
- Songwriters: Enrique Iglesias; Coti Sorokin
- Producer: Enrique Iglesias

Enrique Iglesias singles chronology
"Push" (2008)	"¿Dónde Están Corazón?" (2008)	"Can You Hear Me?" (2008)

"¿Dónde Están Corazón?" (English: Where Are They, Sweetheart?) is the first single released by Enrique Iglesias from his compilation album Enrique Iglesias: 95/08 Exitos.

== Song information ==
The track is a Latin ballad with soft rock instrumentation written by Enrique Iglesias and Argentine music producer Coti Sorokin. The musical arrangements of the song are very melancholic and the lyrics talk about remembering the memories with an old love and joyful experiences of times that will never comeback and how the singer yearns for those good old times to comeback with his lover. The single became the 18th chart topper for Iglesias on the Billboard Hot Latin Tracks chart. Iglesias said in the Making of the music video for the single that he had chosen the song as the lead single of the greatest hits album because he identified with the lyrics of the song and liked them, a lot, he also made a reggaeton version of the song with Randy from the Latin urban duo Jowell & Randy. It won the Song of the Year award at the Premio Lo Nuestro 2009.

== Chart performance ==
The track debuted on the United States Billboard Hot Latin Tracks chart at number 4 on 23 February 2008, spending two weeks at the summit, descending from the top spot for two weeks to climb back to pole position in the week of 20 March 2008 for a third week at number-one.

=== Weekly charts ===
Chart (2008)	Peak position
US Hot Latin Songs (Billboard)	1
US Latin Pop Airplay (Billboard)	1

== See also ==
- List of number-one Billboard Hot Latin Songs of 2008
