= Lluvia cae =

"Lluvia Cae"

Single by Enrique Iglesias

from the album Vivir
- Released: 13 October 1997
- Recorded: 1995–1996
- Studio: Nadir Studios; Cinearte Studios (Madrid, Spain); New River Studios (Fort Lauderdale, Florida); Ocean Way Recording & Westlake Audio (Hollywood, California)
- Genre: Latin pop
- Length: 4:33
- Label: Fonovisa
- Songwriters: Ragael Pérez-Botija; Enrique Iglesias
- Producer: Rafael Pérez-Botija

Enrique Iglesias singles chronology
"Revolución" (1997)	"Lluvia Cae" (1997)	"Al Despertar" (1997)

"Lluvia Cae" ("Rain is Falling") is the title of the fifth single released by Spanish singer-songwriter Enrique Iglesias from his second studio album, Vivir (1997), It was released on 13 October 1997 (see 1997 in music).

== Song information ==
The track was written and produced by Rafael Pérez-Botija, and co-written by Enrique Iglesias, and became the second single in a row not to peak at number one in the Billboard Hot Latin Tracks, after "Revolución" reached only number six.

== Chart performance ==
The track debuted on the United States Billboard Hot Latin Tracks chart at number 29 on 20 December 1997 and peaked at number 3 on 7 February 1998 for two weeks. The single was blocked from the top spot, in the first week by "En El Jardín" by Alejandro Fernández featuring Gloria Estefan (#1) and "Contigo (Estar Contigo)" by Luis Miguel (#2), and in the second week by "Por Qué Te Conocí" by Los Temerarios (#1) and "En El Jardín" (#2).

Chart (1997/1998)	Peak position
U.S. Billboard Hot Latin Tracks	3
U.S. Billboard Latin Pop Airplay	4
U.S. Billboard Latin Regional Mexican Airplay	7
U.S. Billboard Latin Tropical/Salsa Airplay	9
