= List of number-one Billboard Hot Latin Tracks of 1997 =

This is a list containing the Billboard Hot Latin Tracks number-ones of 1997.

Issue date	Song	Artist(s)	Ref.
January 4	"Trapecista"	Enrique Iglesias	
January 11	Así Como Te Conocí"	Marco Antonio Solís	
January 18	Así Como Te Conocí"	Marco Antonio Solís	
January 25	Así Como Te Conocí"	Marco Antonio Solís	
February 1	"Enamorado Por Primera Vez"	Enrique Iglesias	
February 8	"Enamorado Por Primera Vez"	Enrique Iglesias	
February 15	"Enamorado Por Primera Vez"	Enrique Iglesias	
February 22	"Enamorado Por Primera Vez"	Enrique Iglesias	
March 1	"Enamorado Por Primera Vez"	Enrique Iglesias	
March 8	"Enamorado Por Primera Vez"	Enrique Iglesias	
March 15	"Enamorado Por Primera Vez"	Enrique Iglesias	
March 22	"Enamorado Por Primera Vez"	Enrique Iglesias	
March 29	"Enamorado Por Primera Vez"	Enrique Iglesias	
April 5	"Enamorado Por Primera Vez"	Enrique Iglesias	
April 12	"Enamorado Por Primera Vez"	Enrique Iglesias	
April 19	"Enamorado Por Primera Vez"	Enrique Iglesias	
April 26	"Ya Me Voy Para Siempre"	Los Temerarios	
May 3	"Sólo En Tí"	Enrique Iglesias	
May 11	"Sólo En Tí"	Enrique Iglesias	
May 17	"Sólo En Tí"	Enrique Iglesias	
May 24	"Sólo En Tí"	Enrique Iglesias	
May 31	"Sólo En Tí"	Enrique Iglesias	
June 7	"Sólo En Tí"	Enrique Iglesias	
June 14	"El Destino"	Juan Gabriel and Rocío Dúrcal	
June 21	"Sólo En Tí"	Enrique Iglesias	
June 28	"Sólo En Tí"	Enrique Iglesias	
July 5	"Sólo En Tí"	Enrique Iglesias	
July 12	"Sólo En Tí"	Enrique Iglesias	
July 19	"El Mojado Acaudalado"	Los Tigres del Norte	
July 26	"El Mojado Acaudalado"	Los Tigres del Norte	
August 2	"No Pretendo"	Gloria Estefan	
August 9	"Miente"	Enrique Iglesias	
August 16	"Miente"	Enrique Iglesias	
August 23	"Miente"	Enrique Iglesias	
August 30	"Miente"	Enrique Iglesias	
September 6	"Por Debajo De La Mesa"	Luis Miguel	
September 13	"Por Debajo De La Mesa"	Luis Miguel	
September 20	"Por Debajo De La Mesa"	Luis Miguel	
September 27	"Por Debajo De La Mesa"	Luis Miguel	
October 4	"Te Sigo Amando"	Juan Gabriel	
October 11	"La Venia Bendita"	Marco Antonio Solís	
October 18	"Si Tú Supieras"	Alejandro Fernández	
October 25	"Si Tú Supieras"	Alejandro Fernández	
November 1	"Si Tú Supieras"	Alejandro Fernández	
November 8	"Si Tú Supieras"	Alejandro Fernández	
November 15	"Si Tú Supieras"	Alejandro Fernández	
November 22	"Lo Mejor de Mí"	Cristian Castro	
November 29	"Y Hubo Alguien"	Marc Anthony	
December 6	"Y Hubo Alguien"	Marc Anthony	
December 13	"Y Hubo Alguien"	Marc Anthony	
December 21	"Y Hubo Alguien"	Marc Anthony	
December 27	"En El Jardín"	Alejandro Fernández and Gloria Estefan	

== See also ==
- Billboard Hot Latin Tracks
