= Esperanza (Enrique Iglesias song) =

Single by Enrique Iglesias

from the album Cosas del Amor
- Released: 7 September 1998
- Recorded: 1998
- Studio: Ocean Way Recording (Los Angeles, California)
- Length: 3:11
- Label: Fonovisa
- Songwriters: Enrique Iglesias; Chein García-Alonso
- Producer: Rafael Pérez-Botija

Enrique Iglesias singles chronology
"Al Despertar" (1998)	"Esperanza" (1998)	"Nunca Te Olvidaré" (1999)

Music video
- "Esperanza" on YouTube

"Esperanza" (English: "Hope") is a song by Spanish singer Enrique Iglesias for his third studio album Cosas del Amor (1998). It was co-written by Iglesias and Chein García-Alonso with Rafael Pérez-Botija handling its production. A power ballad, it is a confessional song of love and forgiveness. Upon "Esperanza"'s release, one reviewer lauded Iglesias's vocals and the song's arrangements while another found it too similar to his debut single "Si Tú Te Vas". Filmed in Malibu, California, the accompanying music video for "Esperanza" was directed by Emmanuel Lubezki, which won Video of the Year at the 11th Annual Lo Nuestro Awards in 1999. "Esperanza" also won "Song of the Year" and an American Society of Composers, Authors and Publishers (ASCAP) Latin Award in the same year. Commercially, it reached number one in Guatemala, Nicaragua, and Panama as well as the Billboard Hot Latin Songs and Latin Pop Airplay charts in the United States, while becoming a top-five hit in Colombia, Costa Rica, Honduras and El Salvador.

== Background and composition ==
On 30 July 1998, Iglesias announced that he was recording his third studio album, Cosas del Amor, at Ocean Way Recording in Los Angeles, California. It was produced by Spanish producer Rafael Pérez-Botija, who had previously worked with Iglesias on his records. Cosas del Amor, which was released on 22 September 1998, features a collection of power ballads. One of the ballads from the album, "Esperanza", was written by Iglesias and Chein Alonso Garcia and is a "confessional song of forgiveness and love". The song was later included on Iglesias's compilation albums The Best Hits (1999) and the deluxe edition of Enrique Iglesias: 95/08 Éxitos (2008).

== Promotion and reception ==
"Esperanza" was released as the lead single from the album on 7 September 1998 by Fonovisa Records. Its music video was filmed in Malibu, California and directed by Emmanuel Lubezki. The video features Argentine model Inés Rivero, whom Iglesias is attempting to resuscitate after drowning while also reminiscing about the past with her. It won Video of the Year at the 11th Annual Lo Nuestro Awards in 1999. Joey Guerra of the Houston Chronicle praised Iglesias's "nuanced vocal" style and the song's "winsome" arrangement; however, Russell McCrory from The Monitor was less favorable towards the track, where he felt that "Esperanza" was too similar to his 1995 debut single "Si Tú Te Vas". The single received the Song of the Year award at the inaugural Ritmo Music Awards in 1999, and was recognized as one of the best-performing songs of the year on the Pop/Ballad field at the ASCAP Latin Awards. "Esperanza" was included on the set list of Iglesias's second world tour—the Cosas del Amor Tour, where he embarked on the same year.

Commercially in Latin America, it reached number one in Guatemala, Nicaragua, and Panama, and was a top-five hit in Colombia, Costa Rica, El Salvador, and Honduras. In the US, "Esperanza" debuted at number four on the Billboard Hot Latin Songs chart on the week of 26 September 1998. It reached the number one position on the chart in the week of 24 October 1998 following the chart's two week hiatus due to damage to the Broadcast Data Systems in Puerto Rico caused by Hurricane Georges. It spent four consecutive weeks in this position before being replaced by Shakira's song "Ciega, Sordomuda". The track additionally peaked atop the Latin Pop Airplay chart for four consecutive weeks.

== Charts ==
=== Weekly charts ===
Weekly chart positions for "Esperanza"
Chart (1998)	Peak position
Colombia (Notimex)	2
Costa Rica (Notimex)	3
El Salvador (Notimex)	2
Guatemala (Notimex)	1
Honduras (Notimex)	4
Nicaragua (Notimex)	1
Panama (Notimex)	1
US Hot Latin Songs (Billboard)	1
US Latin Pop Airplay (Billboard)	1

=== Year-end charts ===
1998 year-end chart performance for "Eserpanza"
Chart (1998)	Position
US Hot Latin Songs (Billboard)	27
US Latin Pop Airplay (Billboard)	15

== Track listing ==
European CD single

1. "Esperanza" — 3:12
2. "Viviré y Moriré" — 4:04
3. "Revolución" — 3:55
4. "Por Amarte" — 4:05

US CD single

1. "Esperanza" (Fernando's Club Mix) — 6:18
2. "Esperanza" (Fernando's Dub Mix) — 5:19
3. "Esperanza" (Fernando's radio edit) — 4:08
4. "Esperanza" (album version) — 3:09

== See also ==
- List of number-one Billboard Hot Latin Tracks of 1998
- List of Billboard Latin Pop Airplay number ones of 1998
