= Enrique Iglesias: 95/08 Éxitos =

Compilation album by Enrique Iglesias
- Released: 25 March 2008 (United States)
- Recorded: 1995–2007
- Genre: Latin pop
- Label: Universal Music Latino

Enrique Iglesias chronology
Insomniac (2007)	Enrique Iglesias: 95/08 Éxitos (2008)	Greatest Hits (2008)

Singles from Enrique Iglesias: 95/08 Éxitos
- 1. "¿Dónde Están Corazón?" Released: February 2008; 2. "Lloro Por Ti" Released: July 2008

Professional ratings
Review scores
Source	Rating
AllMusic	3.5/5 stars

Enrique Iglesias: 95/08 Éxitos is a compilation album by Spanish singer songwriter Enrique Iglesias. Includes his seventeen number-one singles in the Billboard Hot Latin Tracks and two new songs, "¿Dónde Están Corazón?" and "Lloro Por Ti", both written by Enrique Iglesias and Coti Sorokin. The album's two singles "¿Dónde Están Corazón?" and "Lloro Por Tí" became his 18th and 19th number one singles on the Hot Latin Songs, achieving more number ones than any other artist in the history of the chart.

The album is released in two formats, standard edition with twelve number-one singles, plus two new songs, and the deluxe edition with seventeen number-one singles, two new songs, a DVD with eight music videos and an interview recorded during the worldwide tour Insomniac.

On 6 May 2008 the RIAA certified the album Double Platino in the United States. It was also certified Platinum in Russia. 95/08 Éxitos won the Lo Nuestro Award for Pop Album of the Year.

== Track listing ==
Standard edition
No.	Title	Length
1.	"Experiencia Religiosa"	5:28
2.	"Si Tú Te Vas"	4:00
3.	"Por Amarte"	4:05
4.	"Enamorado Por Primera Vez"	4:28
5.	"Sólo En Ti"	3:31
6.	"Nunca Te Olvidaré"	4:23
7.	"Bailamos" (from Wild Wild West)	3:38
8.	"Ritmo Total"	3:29
9.	"Héroe"	4:23
10.	"Mentiroso"	3:55
11.	"Quizás"	4:11
12.	"Dímelo"	3:38
13.	"¿Dónde Están Corazón?"	4:18
14.	"Lloro Por Ti"	4:07

=== Deluxe edition track listing ===
1. Experiencia Religiosa – 1995
2. Si Tú Te Vas – 1995
3. Por Amarte – 1995
4. No Llores Por Mí 1995
5. Trapecista – 1997
6. Enamorado Por Primera Vez – 1997
7. Sólo En Ti – 1997
8. Miente – 1998
9. Esperanza – 1998
10. Nunca Te Olvidaré – 1998
11. Bailamos – 1999
12. Ritmo Total – 1999
13. Héroe – 2001
14. Mentiroso / La Chica de Ayer (Spanish Edition) – 2002
15. Para Qué La Vida – 2002
16. Quizás – 2002
17. Dímelo – 2007
18. ¿Dónde Están Corazón? – 2008
19. Lloro Por Ti – 2008

DVD

1. Bailamos (Remix) – 1999
2. Ritmo Total (Rhythm Divine) – 2000
3. Héroe – 2001
4. Escapar – 2001
5. Mentiroso – 2002
6. Dímelo – 2006
7. Alguien Soy Yo – 2007
8. Dónde Están Corazón? – 2008
9. Interview with Enrique Iglesias

== Charts ==
=== Weekly charts ===
Chart (2008)	Peak position
Mexican Albums (Top 100 Mexico)	2
Portuguese Albums (AFP)	26
Spanish Albums (PROMUSICAE)	12
US Billboard 200	18
US Top Latin Albums (Billboard)	1
US Latin Pop Albums (Billboard)	1

=== Year-end charts ===
Chart (2008)	Position
US Billboard 200	191
US Top Latin Albums (Billboard)	5

Chart (2009)	Position
US Top Latin Albums (Billboard)	12

== Sales and certifications ==
Region	Certification	Certified units/sales
Argentina (CAPIF)	Gold	20,000^{^}
Mexico (AMPROFON)	Gold	40,000^{^}
Russia (NFPF)	Platinum	20,000^{*}
United States (RIAA)	2× Platinum (Latin)	200,000^{^}
^{*} Sales figures based on certification alone.^{^} Shipments figures based on certification alone.
