= Nunca Te Olvidaré =

Song by Enrique Iglesias (1999)

Single by Enrique Iglesias

from the album Cosas del Amor
- Released: January 1999
- Recorded: 1998
- Studio: Ocean Way Recording (Los Angeles, California)
- Length: 4:23 (album version); 3:59 (radio edit)
- Label: Fonovisa
- Songwriter: Enrique Iglesias
- Producer: Rafael Pérez-Botija

Enrique Iglesias singles chronology
"Esperanza" (1998)	"Nunca Te Olvidaré" (1999)	"Bailamos" (1999)

Music video
- "Nunca Te Olvidaré" on YouTube

"Nunca Te Olvidaré" (transl. "I'll Never Forget You") is a song by Spanish singer Enrique Iglesias for his third studio album Cosas del Amor (1998). It was written by Iglesias with Rafael Pérez-Botija handling its production. A power ballad, it is a confessional song of staying in love through time and other lovers. Upon its release, it was met with generally positive reactions from music critics, although one reviewer was less impressed with it along with the other ballads from the album. The song was featured as the main theme for the 1999 Mexican telenovela of the same name.

"Nunca Te Olvidaré" was released as the second single from Cosas del Amor in January 1999 and was included on the set list for the Cosas del Amor Tour (1999). The song's accompanying music video was filmed in Mexico and features several woman watching the artist sing through their windows. The track was a recipient of an American Society of Composers, Authors and Publishers (ASCAP) Latin Award in 1999. Commercially, it topped the Billboard Hot Latin Songs and Latin Pop Airplay charts in the United States.

== Background and composition ==
On 30 July 1998, Iglesias announced that he was recording his third studio album, Cosas del Amor, at Ocean Way Recording in Los Angeles, California. It was produced by Spanish producer Rafael Pérez-Botija, who had previously worked with Iglesias on his past records. Cosas del Amor, which was released on 22 September 1998, features a collection of power ballads. One of the ballads from the album, "Nunca Te Olvidaré", was written by Iglesias. The ballad is about a "confessional moment, a vow to stay in love through the passage of time and other lovers". According to Iglesias: "It is one of the songs that I have sent the most joy and sadness when writing. Say that there are times in life, this sounds very philosophical, what do you know that there are people you meet and you end up loving them very much, but you know that no matter how much you love them you will not be able to be together; due to circumstances, ways of being or because you are very different, they are one of those people that you will never, ever to be able to forget". The ballad is backed by a piano and a "cinematic" orchestra while Iglesias performs with a falsetto.

== Promotion and reception ==
"Nunca Te Olvidaré" was released as the released as the second single from Cosas del Amor in January 1999 by Fonovisa Records. The song was featured on the Mexican telenovela of the same name which began airing in the same month. "Nunca Te Olvidaré" was later included on Iglesias' compilation albums The Best Hits (1999) and Enrique Iglesias: 95/08 Éxitos (2008), On the review of Cosas del Amor, a writer for El Norte called "Nunca Te Olvidaré" "one of the best tracks on the album". Joey Guerra of the Houston Chronicle praised Iglesias' "nuanced vocal style" and the song's "winsome arrangement". Russell McCrory from The Monitor noted Iglesias "lamenting his way" in the song and cited it along with "Contigo" where the artist "understands that girls (his primary audience) can't help but like a sensitive man". The Dallas Morning News critic Mario Tarradell unfavorably cited the song as one of the ballads on the album being "underbaked". In 2020, Billboard editor Lucas Villas listed it as one of "Our 10 Favorite Hits" by the artist on the website and commented that Iglesias "tapped into his falsetto for a performance that's truly unforgettable."

"Nunca Te Olvidaré" was included on the set list of Iglesias's second world tour—the Cosas del Amor Tour (1999). The accompanying music video was filmed in San Miguel de Allende, Mexico and features Mexican actress Edith González, who is also the lead actress of the telenovela. In the video, Iglesias is performing the track with an orchestra while several women watch outside their windows. It was recognized as one of the best-performing songs of the year at the ASCAP Latin Awards under the pop/ballad category in 2000. Commercially, "Nunca Te Olvidaré" topped the Billboard Hot Latin Songs and Latin Pop Airplay charts in the US.

== Formats and track listings ==
Radio edit

1. Nunca Te Olvidaré (radio edit) – 3:59
2. Nunca Te Olvidaré (club version mix) – 6:01

== Charts ==
=== Weekly charts ===
1999 weekly chart performance
Chart (1999)	Peak position
US Hot Latin Songs (Billboard)	1
US Latin Pop Airplay (Billboard)	1

2026 weekly chart performance
Chart (2026)	Peak position
El Salvador Airplay (ASAP EGC)	6

=== Year-end charts ===
1999 year-end chart performance for "Nunca Te Olvidaré"
Chart (1999)	Position
US Hot Latin Songs (Billboard)	17
US Latin Pop Airplay (Billboard)	5

== See also ==
- List of number-one Billboard Hot Latin Tracks of 1999
- List of Billboard Latin Pop Airplay number ones of 1999
