= List of number-one Billboard Top Latin Albums from the 1990s =

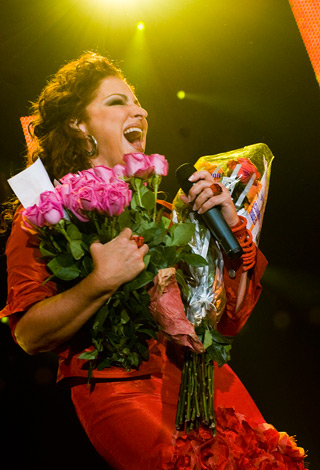
Mi Tierra by Cuban performer Gloria Estefan was the first album to peak at number one on the chart in 1993. It spent 58 non-consecutive weeks at the top.

The Billboard Top Latin Albums chart, published in Billboard magazine, is a record chart that features Latin music sales information. The data is compiled by Nielsen SoundScan from a sample that includes music stores, music departments at electronics and department stores, Internet sales (both physical and digital) and verifiable sales from concert venues in the United States.

During the 1990s, there were 36 number-one albums in this chart, which was first published on July 10, 1993. One album peaked at number one in the first year of publication: Mi Tierra, by Cuban singer-songwriter Gloria Estefan. The album also peaked at number 27 on the Billboard 200, and was certified platinum by the Recording Industry Association of America (RIAA). It won the Best Traditional Tropical Album award at the Grammy Awards of 1994. Mi Tierra spent 25 weeks at number one in 1993 and 33 weeks at this position in 1994. Segundo Romance by Mexican singer Luis Miguel also peaked at number one; this album was at the top for 29 consecutive weeks, starting in late 1994. It won the Grammy Award for Best Latin Pop Album in 1995, defeating albums from singers Cristian Castro, Plácido Domingo, Juan Gabriel and Tejano music group La Mafia; the latter also peaked at number one in March 1995 with their live album Éxitos En Vivo.

Five albums by Tex-Mex music performer Selena reached number one on the chart; her album Amor Prohibido was number one during four separate stretches, including a 16-week stay at the top that started three weeks after her death. After this stretch, it was replaced by her first English-language album titled Dreaming of You, which also debuted at number one in the Billboard 200, making Selena the first Hispanic singer to debut at the top of this chart and the second-highest debut of the year after Michael Jackson's HIStory: Past, Present and Future, Book I. On its release date, the album sold over 175,000 copies, a record for a female pop singer, and sold two million copies in its first year. This album became the first to peak at number one in three calendar years (1995–1997). Three best-of collections by the singer, entitled Siempre Selena, Anthology and All My Hits - Todos Mis Exitos Vol. 1 also topped the chart. The self-titled debut album by Enrique Iglesias was atop the chart for 11 weeks and won the Grammy Award for Best Latin Pop Album at the 39th Grammy Awards. Two albums related to the song "Macarena" hit the top spot of the chart: Macarena Non Stop by Los del Río, which spent four non-consecutive weeks at number-one, starting on August 3, 1996, and Macarena Mix, a compilation album with music by Sandalo, Manolos, El Lupe and The Sacados, which spent nine weeks at number-one from September 21 through November 16, 1996.

Tango by Julio Iglesias, the last number-one album of 1996, spent 10 weeks at the top of the chart and became the best-selling Latin album of 1997. Romances by Luis Miguel won the Grammy Award for Best Latin Pop Album, debuted at number 14 in the Billboard 200, and spent 11 non-consecutive weeks at number one on this chart. In 1998, the compilation album released for the film Dance with Me, which starred Vanessa L. Williams and Chayanne, became the first soundtrack to reach the top spot of this chart. Buena Vista Social Club, produced by Ry Cooder, also peaked at number one and won the Grammy Award for Best Tropical Latin Performance. Me Estoy Enamorando by Alejandro Fernández spent nine weeks at the top of the chart and ended the year as the best-selling Latin album of 1998. Colombian singer-songwriter Shakira with ¿Dónde Están los Ladrones?, her first number-one album, spent 11 weeks at number one, received a nomination for a Grammy Award for Best Latin Rock/Alternative Album and was certified platinum in the United States by the RIAA. Marco Antonio Solís peaked at number one for the first time on this chart with his album Trozos de Mi Alma, which was certified gold by the RIAA and was produced by Bebu Silvetti. Ricky Martin was awarded the Grammy Award for Best Latin Pop Album for Vuelve, which spent 26 non-consecutive weeks at the top of the chart between 1998 and 1999. Latin rock performer Santana debuted and peaked at number one with Supernatural during the only week that the album appeared on this chart. The album was removed from the chart the following week after it was determined by Billboard to not meet the requirement for an album to have at least 50% of its recordings in Spanish.

== Number-one albums ==
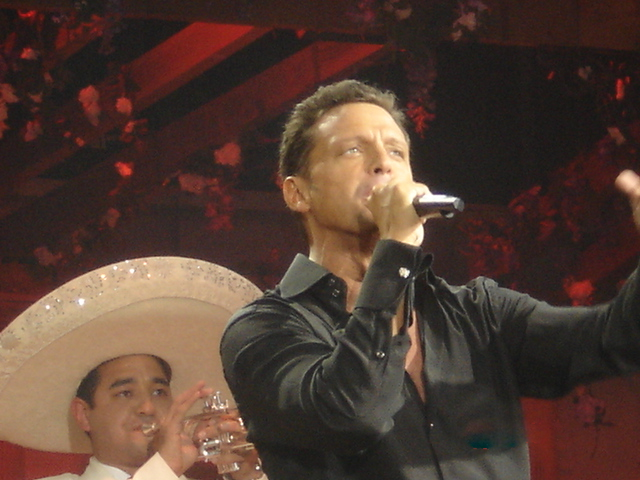
Mexican singer Luis Miguel released four number-one albums during the 1990s: Segundo Romance, Nada Es Igual..., Romances and Amarte Es Un Placer.

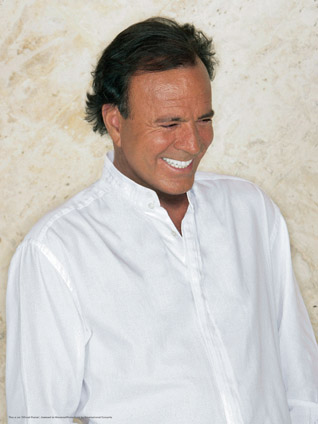
Tango by Julio Iglesias was the best-selling Latin album of 1997, and received a platinum certification by the Recording Industry Association of America.

| Album | Artist | Date | Weeks |
|---|---|---|---|
| Mi Tierra | Gloria Estefan | July 10, 1993 – June 4, 1994 | 58 |
| Amor Prohibido | Selena | June 11, 1994 – June 18, 1994 | 2 |
| Mi Tierra | Gloria Estefan | June 25, 1994 | 1 |
| Amor Prohibido | Selena | July 2, 1994 | 1 |
| Mi Tierra | Gloria Estefan | July 9, 1994 – September 3, 1994 | 10 |
| Amor Prohibido | Selena | September 10, 1994 | 1 |
| Segundo Romance | Luis Miguel | September 17, 1994 – March 18, 1995 | 27 |
| Éxitos En Vivo | La Mafia | March 25, 1995 | 1 |
| Segundo Romance | Luis Miguel | April 1, 1995 – April 8, 1995 | 2 |
| Amor Prohibido | Selena | April 15, 1995 – July 29, 1995 | 16 |
| Dreaming of You | Selena | August 5, 1995 – May 18, 1996 | 42 |
| Enrique Iglesias | Enrique Iglesias | May 25, 1996 – July 27, 1996 | 10 |
| Macarena Mix | Various artists | August 3, 1996 | 1 |
| Enrique Iglesias | Enrique Iglesias | August 10, 1996 | 1 |
| Macarena Mix | Various artists | August 17, 1996 – August 31, 1996 | 3 |
| Nada Es Igual... | Luis Miguel | September 7, 1996 – September 14, 1996 | 2 |
| Macarena Non Stop | Los del Río | September 21, 1996 – November 16, 1996 | 9 |
| Siempre Selena | Selena | November 23, 1996 – November 30, 1996 | 2 |
| Tango | Julio Iglesias | December 7, 1996 – February 8, 1997 | 10 |
| Vivir | Enrique Iglesias | February 15, 1997 – April 5, 1997 | 8 |
| Dreaming of You | Selena | April 12, 1997 – April 19, 1997 | 2 |
| Vivir | Enrique Iglesias | April 26, 1997 – May 10, 1997 | 3 |
| Llévame Contigo | Olga Tañón | May 17, 1997 | 1 |
| Juntos Otra Vez | Juan Gabriel and Rocío Dúrcal | May 24, 1997 | 1 |
| Vivir | Enrique Iglesias | May 31, 1997 – June 21, 1997 | 4 |
| Juntos Otra Vez | Juan Gabriel and Rocío Dúrcal | June 28, 1997 | 1 |
| Jefe de Jefes | Los Tigres del Norte | July 5, 1997 – August 9, 1997 | 6 |
| Sentimientos | Charlie Zaa | August 16, 1997 | 1 |
| Jefe de Jefes | Los Tigres del Norte | August 23, 1997 | 1 |
| Romances | Luis Miguel | August 30, 1997 – October 25, 1997 | 9 |
| Sueños Líquidos | Maná | November 1, 1997 | 1 |
| Romances | Luis Miguel | November 8, 1997 – November 15, 1997 | 2 |
| Contra la Corriente | Marc Anthony | November 22, 1997 – December 6, 1997 | 3 |
| Me Estoy Enamorando | Alejandro Fernández | December 13, 1997 – February 21, 1998 | 11 |
| Vuelve | Ricky Martin | February 28, 1998 – March 14, 1998 | 3 |
| Buena Vista Social Club | Buena Vista Social Club | March 21, 1998 | 1 |
| Vuelve | Ricky Martin | March 28, 1998 – April 18, 1998 | 4 |
| Anthology | Selena | April 25, 1998 – May 30, 1998 | 6 |
| Me Estoy Enamorando | Alejandro Fernández | June 6, 1998 | 1 |
| Suavemente | Elvis Crespo | June 13, 1998 | 1 |
| Vuelve | Ricky Martin | June 20, 1998 – July 25, 1998 | 6 |
| Suavemente | Elvis Crespo | August 1, 1998 | 1 |
| Vuelve | Ricky Martin | August 8, 1998 – August 22, 1998 | 3 |
| Dance with Me: Music from the Motion Picture | Soundtrack | August 29, 1998 – October 3, 1998 | 6 |
| Cosas del Amor | Enrique Iglesias | October 10, 1998 – November 7, 1998 | 5 |
| Te Acordarás de Mí | Olga Tañón | November 14, 1998 – November 21, 1998 | 2 |
| Dónde Están los Ladrones? | Shakira | November 28, 1998 – February 6, 1999 | 11 |
| Trozos de Mi Alma | Marco Antonio Solís | February 13, 1999 | 1 |
| Cosas del Amor | Enrique Iglesias | February 20, 1999 – March 6, 1999 | 3 |
| Vuelve | Ricky Martin | March 13, 1999 – March 20, 1999 | 2 |
| All My Hits – Todos Mis Exitos Vol. 1 | Selena | March 27, 1999 – April 3, 1999 | 2 |
| Vuelve | Ricky Martin | April 10, 1999 – May 22, 1999 | 7 |
| Píntame | Elvis Crespo | May 29, 1999 – June 5, 1999 | 2 |
| Vuelve | Ricky Martin | June 12, 1999 | 1 |
| Píntame | Elvis Crespo | June 19, 1999 | 1 |
| All My Hits – Todos Mis Exitos Vol. 1 | Selena | June 26, 1999 | 1 |
| Supernatural | Santana | July 3, 1999 | 1 |
| MTV Unplugged | Maná | July 10, 1999 – July 17, 1999 | 2 |
| Bailamos Greatest Hits | Enrique Iglesias | July 24, 1999 – September 25, 1999 | 10 |
| Amarte Es Un Placer | Luis Miguel | October 2, 1999 – November 27, 1999 | 9 |
| Desde Un Principio: From the Beginning | Marc Anthony | December 4, 1999 – December 25, 1999 | 4 |

== See also ==
- 1990s in Latin music
