= Por Debajo de la Mesa =

1997 song by Luis Miguel

Single by Luis Miguel

from the album Romances
- Released: 15 July 1997
- Recorded: 1997
- Genre: Bolero
- Length: 3:03
- Label: WEA Latina
- Songwriter: Armando Manzanero
- Producer: Luis Miguel

Luis Miguel singles chronology
"Que Tu Te Vas" (1996)	"Por Debajo de la Mesa" (1997)	"El Reloj" (1997)

Music video
- "Por Debajo de la Mesa" on YouTube

"Por Debajo de la Mesa" ("Underneath the Table") is a song written by Armando Manzanero and performed by Mexican recording artist Luis Miguel. Arranged by Bebu Silvetti, it was one of the two original compositions written for Miguel's fifteenth studio album Romances. It was released as the lead single from the album on 15 July 1997 and it became his thirteenth number-one single on the Billboard Hot Latin Songs chart in the United States. The music video features Miguel performing at a fine-dining restaurant in New York City.

The track received a negative reaction from Achy Obejas of the Chicago Tribune who called it "lame". It was nominated Pop Song of the Year at the 10th Annual Lo Nuestro Awards and Manzanero was awarded a Broadcast Music, Inc. (BMI) Latin Award for writing the song. Manzanero performed the record as a duet with several artists such as Tania Libertad and Susana Zabaleta.

== Background ==
In 1991, Miguel released Romance, a collection of classic Latin ballads, the oldest of which dates back to the 1940s. The album was produced by Armando Manzanero and arranged by Bebu Silvetti, and was credited for revitalizing the bolero genre. It also made history as the first Spanish-language album to be certified gold by the Recording Industry Association of America (RIAA) in the United States. A follow-up to Romance was released in 1994 under the title Segundo Romance (Second Romance), which was produced by Miguel, Juan Carlos Calderón and Kiko Cibrian. Both albums received a platinum certification by the RIAA in the United States and also became successful in countries outside of Latin America and the United States, such as Finland and Saudi Arabia, selling over twelve million copies combined.

In December 1996, Miguel held a press conference in Buenos Aires, Argentina, where he announced his desire to record a third Romance album and mentioned the possibility of working with Manzanero and Juan Gabriel. He also expressed an interest in singing in Italian and Portuguese, although the album's songs are originally all in Spanish. Two months later Manzanero confirmed that he was working with Miguel on another bolero-inspired ballad album, under the tentative title Tercer Romance ("Third Romance"). Miguel's record label confirmed that fourteen tracks would be included on the album under the title Romances. "Por Debajo de la Mesa" was written by Manzanero as one of the two original compositions for the album along with "Contigo (Estar Contigo)". Manzanero stated that "Por Debajo de la Mesa" and "Dormir Contigo" were two of his favorite songs that he composed for Miguel.

== Promotion ==
Luis Miguel "Por Debajo de la Mesa" (1997)
A sample of the lead single "Por Debajo de la Mesa", an original composition for the album by Armando Manzanero.

A music video for "Por Debajo de la Mesa" was filmed in New York City which features Miguel performing at the Rainbow Room with the video being shot in black-and-white. It was directed by Daniela Federici. The song was included on his greatest hits album Mis Boleros Favoritos (2002) and Grandes Éxitos (2005). A live version of the song was included on his album Vivo (2000) as part of the "Romances Medley".

== Release and reception ==
"Por Debajo de la Mesa" serviced to radio stations across Latin America on 5 July 1997. In the United States, the song debuted at number two on the Billboard Hot Latin Songs chart on the week of 2 August 1997. Six weeks later, it peaked at number one on the chart and remained on the position for four weeks. "Por Debajo de la Mesa" ended 1997 as the eighth best-performing Latin single of the year in the United States. The track also peaked at number one on the Billboard Latin Pop Songs chart where it spent five weeks on top of the chart and was the best-performing Latin pop song of the year in the country.

Despite giving Romances a positive review, Chicago Tribune editor Achy Obejas called "Por Debajo de la Mesa" a "lame" song and cited it as one of the songs where Miguel is beginning "to slip" on his ballad recordings. Mario Tarradell of The Dallas Morning News felt the track's arrangements "is so stifling, so precious, it's difficult to feel any sensuality. Mr. Miguel tries to muster a seductive tone, but it's no use. This is a love song for the chaste." It received a nomination for Pop Song of the Year at the Lo Nuestro Awards of 1998, losing to "Si Tú Supieras" by Alejandro Fernández. Manzanero was given a BMI Latin Award for composition of the song due to it being one of the best-performing Latin songs of the year. At the inaugural Juventud Awards in 2004, "Por Debajo de la Mesa" was nominated in the category for "La Más Pegajosa" ("Catchiest Tune"), but lost to "El Za Za Za" by Liberación.

== Charts ==
=== Weekly charts ===
Chart (1997)	Peak position
Mexico Exitos Nacionales (Notitas Musicales)	1
US Hot Latin Songs (Billboard)	1
US Latin Pop Airplay (Billboard)	1

=== Year-end charts ===
Chart (1997)	Position
US Latin Songs (Billboard)	8
US Latin Pop Airplay (Billboard)	1

== Certifications ==
Region	Certification	Certified units/sales
Spain (Promusicae)	Gold	30,000^{‡}
^{‡} Sales+streaming figures based on certification alone.

== Other recordings ==
Manzanero has sung "Por Debajo de la Mesa" as a duet with Peruvian musician, Tania Libertad on the duo's studio album Manzanero y la Libertad (1998) and with Chano Domínguez and Carmen Paris on Manzanero's album Duetos 2 (2002). He also performed the song in a concert with Argentine pianist, Raúl di Blasio in 1999 which was included on the latter's live album Bohemia, Vol.2 (2000) and also performed the song live with fellow Mexican singer, Susana Zabaleta on their album De la A a la Z (2006).

== See also ==
- Billboard Top Latin Songs Year-End Chart
- List of number-one Billboard Hot Latin Tracks of 1997
- List of Billboard Latin Pop Airplay number ones of 1997
