= Al Despertar (Enrique Iglesias song) =

Single by Enrique Iglesias

from the album Vivir
- Released: 8 December 1997
- Recorded: 1995–1996
- Studio: Nadir Studios; Cinearte Studios (Madrid, Spain); New River Studios (Fort Lauderdale, Florida); Ocean Way Recording & Westlake Audio (Hollywood, California)
- Genre: Latin pop
- Length: 4:14
- Label: Fonovisa
- Songwriter(s): Enrique Iglesias; Roberto Morales
- Producer(s): Rafael Pérez-Botija

Enrique Iglesias singles chronology
"Lluvia cae" (1997)	"Al Despertar" (1997)	"Esperanza" (1998)

"Al Despertar" (English: Waking Up) is the title of the sixth single released by Spanish singer-songwriter Enrique Iglesias from his second studio album, Vivir (1997), It was released on 8 December 1997 (see 1997 in music).

== Song information ==
The track was written by Enrique Iglesias and Roberto Morales and became the less successful of his singles in United States at the time, peaking only at number 11.

== Chart performance ==
The track debuted on the United States Billboard Hot Latin Tracks chart at number 18 on 7 March 1998 and peaked at number 11 three weeks later on 28 March 1998.

Chart (1998)	Peak position
U.S. Billboard Hot Latin Tracks	11
U.S. Billboard Latin Pop Airplay	8
