= Romances (Luis Miguel album) =

Studio album by Luis Miguel
- Released: 12 August 1997
- Recorded: 1997
- Studios: Ocean Way Recording (Hollywood); The Hit Factory (New York City)
- Genre: Bolero
- Length: 54:05
- Language: Spanish
- Label: WEA Latina
- Producer: Luis Miguel

Luis Miguel chronology
Nada Es Igual... (1996)	Romances (1997)	Amarte Es un Placer (1999)

Singles from Romances
- 1. "Por Debajo de la Mesa" Released: 15 June 1997; 2. "El Reloj" Released: October 1997; 3. "Contigo (Estar Contigo)" Released: 1997; 4. "Bésame Mucho" Released: 1997; 5. "De Quererte Así (De T'Avoir Aimee)" Released: 1997; 6. "La Gloria Eres Tú" Released: 1998

Romances is the twelfth studio album by Mexican singer Luis Miguel, released on 12 August 1997, by WEA Latina. It is the third album of the Romance series, in which Luis Miguel covers Latin songs from 1940 to 1978. Aside from Luis Miguel, the production also involved arranger Bebu Silvetti, and Armando Manzanero, who directed all of Luis Miguel's Romance albums. Romances consists of twelve cover versions and two new compositions by Manzanero and Silvetti. Recording took place in early 1997 at the Ocean Way recording studio in Los Angeles, California.

Romances has sold over 4.5 million copies and received platinum certifications in several Latin American countries, the United States and Spain. Luis Miguel promoted the album by touring the United States, Latin America and Spain. Upon its release, Romances received generally positive reviews from music critics. They mainly praised his vocals and production of the album although few reviewers found the arrangements to be repetitive and the record too similar to its predecessors. The album earned Luis Miguel several awards, including the Grammy Award for Best Latin Pop Performance in the United States. Six singles were released: "Por Debajo de la Mesa", "El Reloj", "Contigo (Estar Contigo)", "De Quererte Así (De T'Avoir Aimee)", "Bésame Mucho", and "La Gloria Eres Tú".

== Background ==
In 1991 Luis Miguel released Romance, a collection of classic Latin ballads, the oldest of which dates back to the 1940s. The album was produced by Armando Manzanero and arranged by Bebu Silvetti, and was credited for revitalizing the bolero genre. It also made history as the first Spanish-language album to be certified gold by the Recording Industry Association of America (RIAA) in the United States. A follow-up to Romance was released in 1994 under the title Segundo Romance (Second Romance), which was produced by Luis Miguel, Juan Carlos Calderón and Kiko Cibrian. Both albums received a platinum certification by the RIAA in the United States and also became successful in countries outside of Latin America and the United States, such as Finland and Saudi Arabia, selling over twelve million copies combined.

In December 1996 Luis Miguel held a press conference in Buenos Aires, Argentina, where he announced his desire to record a third Romance album and mentioned the possibility of working with Manzanero and Juan Gabriel. He also expressed an interest in singing in Italian and Portuguese, although the album's songs are originally all in Spanish. Two months later Manzanero confirmed that he was working with Luis Miguel on another bolero-inspired ballads album, under the tentative title Tercer Romance ("Third Romance"). Luis Miguel's record label confirmed that fourteen tracks would be included on the album under the title Romances.

== Recording and musical style ==
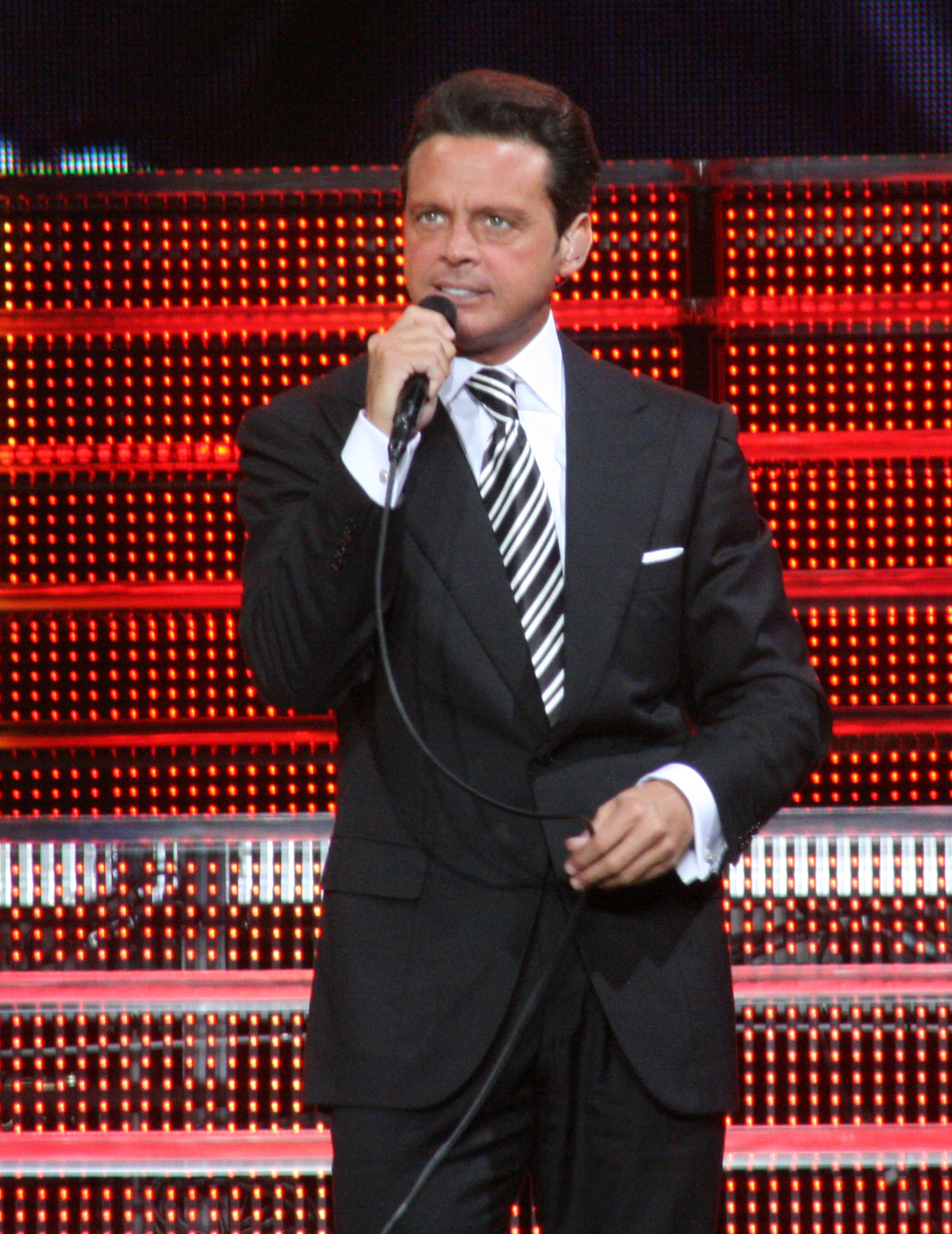
Luis Miguel worked with Armando Manzanero and Bebu Silvetti on the recording of Romances.

Luis Miguel collaborated with Silvetti for the arrangement of Romances, while Manzanero was in charge of direction. Recording began on 18 March 1997, at Ocean Way Recording in Hollywood and at The Hit Factory in New York City. During the recording of Romances, as in Romance, Silvetti employed his signature style of arrangements known as the "Silvetti Sound", which Leila Cobo of Billboard describes as "anchored in sweeping melodies, lush string arrangements, acoustic instrumentation, and above all, unabashed romanticism". Silvetti has stated that when he produces an album he does not simply copy his own arrangements, because he feels that would be "ridiculous", and prefers to be creative within his own style. About the selection of songs for the album, Manzanero stated that "I give [Luis Miguel] the songs, and he chooses what he wants to record." Participants in the recording sessions included sixty-one musicians from the Los Angeles Philharmonic.

Luis Miguel covers twelve ballads in Romances, including songs by José Antonio Méndez, Carlos Arturo Briz, Consuelo Velázquez Álvaro Carrillo, Roberto Cantoral, María Grever, Enrique Santos Discépolo, Agustín Lara. He also covers songs from other musical styles including tango ("Uno"), bossa nova ("Mañana de Carnaval"), and French ("De Quererte Así"). Luis Miguel had performed some of the aforementioned composers' songs on his previous Romance albums. Luis Miguel recorded Manazero's songs "Voy a Apagar la Luz/Contigo Aprendí" ("I Am Going To Turn Off The Lights/With You I Learned") and "Amanecer" ("To Be Awake"). The two original compositions were "Por Debajo de la Mesa" ("Underneath the Table") by Manzanero and "Contigo (Estar Contigo)" ("To Be With You") by Bebu Silvetti and Sylvia Riera Ibáñez.

== Promotion ==
Luis Miguel launched his Romances Tour, consisting of 79 concerts, in Las Vegas, Nevada, on 12 September 1997. The performances featured Luis Miguel performing dance-pop and bolero arrangements for two-and-a-half hours. Adam Sandler of Variety expressed a mixed reaction to the concert in the Universal Amphitheatre in Los Angeles. He noted that Luis Miguel rarely acknowledged his audience or ventured out from center stage. Robert Hilburn of the Los Angeles Times had a more positive reaction, which he described as a "marvelously designed and wonderfully executed blend of Latin music tradition". Another Times contributor, Ernesto Lechner, wrote that Luis Miguel's bolero performance at the Arrowhead Pond arena in California "brought the house down" and stated that the experience at the concert was "pretty close" to Beatlemania. In New York City, Luis Miguel performed five consecutive shows in the Radio City Music Hall. In Mexico City he performed seventeen consecutive concerts in the National Auditorium, where it was the highest-grossing concert by a Latin artist that year. The tour also traveled to South America; including Chile, and Argentina; and continued until May 1998, when Luis Miguel performed throughout Spain. Luis Miguel was the first Latin artist to be inducted to the Pollstar "Top 20 All-Time Grossing Tours" for most tickets sold for consecutive concerts at one venue in 1997.

=== Singles ===
Luis Miguel "Sabor a Mí"
An 18 second sample of Luis Miguel's cover of "Sabor a Mí" which "retains some of its exotic, flamenco guitar-fueled flavor". The song tells of a "sentiment that while true love didn't last, it was a good love".

"Por Debajo de la Mesa" was released as the lead single from the on 15 July 1997, and reached number one on the Billboard Hot Latin Songs chart two months later. The music video for the song was filmed at the Rainbow Room in New York City and was directed by Daniela Federici. The second single released, "El Reloj" ("The Clock"), reached number two on the Hot Latin Songs chart, as did the third single, "Contigo (Estar Contigo").

"Bésame Mucho" ("Kiss Me More") was released as the fourth single and reached number one on the Mexican ballads chart and was among the top ten best-performing songs of 1998 in Venezuela according to Record Report. The fifth single, "De Quererte Así (De T'Avoir Aimee)", peaked at number twenty-three on the Hot Latin Songs chart and number seven on the Mexican ballads chart. "La Gloria Eres Tú" was released as the sixth and final single from the album in 1998. In addition to the singles, "Sabor a Mí" ("Taste From Me") peaked at number six on the Hot Latin Songs chart.

== Critical reception and accolades ==
Professional ratings
Review scores
Source	Rating
AllMusic	4/5 stars
Chicago Tribune	3.5/4 stars
Los Angeles Daily News	3/4 stars
Los Angeles Times	1.5/4 stars
The San Diego Union-Tribune	3/4 stars
The Sydney Morning Herald	3/5 stars

Terry Jenkins of AllMusic praised the collaborative work of Silvetti and Manzanero and called Romances "a sensuous, enchanting album". Achy Obejas of the Chicago Tribune called Luis Miguel's voice the album's strong point and noted the "presence of electronic instruments and the darker, more somber mood". On the other hand, she felt that Luis Miguel was beginning "to slip", citing the tracks "Jurame" and "Por Debajo de la Mesa" as examples. Fernando Gonzalez wrote for the Orange County Register noting although the album is "Impeccably produced, arranged and recorded", he felt that boleros "demand more than that". Gonzalez elaborated: " He sounds simply loud, rather than romantic, in "Sabor a Mi; he comes across as (soap) operatic rather than tormented in "El Reloj "; he is a star—not a humble student—in "Contigo Aprendi"." The Corpus Christi Caller-Times music critic Rene Carbrera wrote a positive review of the album praising the string arrangements as "elegantly done" and complimented Luis Miguel's take on "Sabor a Mí" and "La Gloria Eres Tu" as he had done it "delightfully done in the traditional way and flavored with Trio Los Panchos requinto "cling" endings." Mario Tarradell of The Dallas Morning News wrote an unfavorable review of the recording; he criticized its productions for having all the tracks "awash in silky keyboards and airy strings with just a hint of percussion in the background". He also panned its lead single "Por Debajo de la Mesa" for coming off as a "love song for the chaste" due to its arrangements being "so stifling, so precious, it's difficult to feel any sensuality". Luis M. Garcia of The Sydney Morning Herald referred to the album as a "lush, expensive recording", stating, "he has taken a basketful of classic, romantic boleros, updated some, rearranged others and come up with a fairly acceptable collection of what marketers would probably call 'songs for lovers'... Smooth? Syrupy? Over the top? You bet. But then again, what would you expect from a disc called Romances?".

Los Angeles Times editor Ernesto Lecnher gave the album one-and-a-half out of four stars and claimed that Romances "sinks under its own weight, delivering mostly bloated versions of timeless material". Fellow Los Angeles Times contributor Ed Morales disagreed with his review: "Lechner needs to go into his music room, turn down the lights, snuggle up with his significant other and really listen to 'Romances.' I give his review * and 'Romances' ****" . Anne Valdespino of the Los Angeles Daily News praised the selection of songs and Luis Miguel's performance, calling the performer a "class act". The San Diego Union-Tribune music critic Ernesto Portillo Jr. rated Romances three-out-of four stars and claimed that Luis Miguel's "interpretations are first-rate and the music, with production help from famed composer Armando Manzanero, is executed with exquisite precision". However, he questioned the need for a third in the Romance series as he felt it "diminishes the specialness" of Romance and Segundo Romance noted that not all tracks in the album are "true boleros". El Nuevo Herald editor Eliseo Cardona wrote a mostly positive review of the album. He complimented Luis Miguel's vocals and the productions but stated that Luis Miguel's interpretation of "La Gloria Eres Tu" "pales" compared to Lucho Gatica and José José's cover of the song. Ramiro Burr of the San Antonio Express-News said Romances "sparkles with the joy of visiting good friends" and lauded its "timeless music, beautiful orchestration" and complimented Silvetti's arrangements. Burr commented while "we've heard all these classics before, and seemingly a million times" Luis Miguel "does it so well, it hardly seems to matter."

At the 40th Annual Grammy Awards in the 1998, Luis Miguel won the award for Best Latin Pop Performance. Luis Miguel also received a Billboard Latin Music Award for "Male Pop Album of the Year" and a World Music Award for "Best Selling Latin Artist" in the same year. Luis Miguel received a Premio Amigo and Premio Onda for "Best Latin Singer of the Year" in Spain, and the album was nominated for a Premio Amigo for "Best Latin Album".

== Commercial performance ==
The album was released on 12 August 1997, in the United States and, by the week of 23 August 1997, it debuted at number two on the Billboard Top Latin Albums chart. A week later it became number one, which it has been for a total of eleven non-consecutive weeks. Romances was even more successful in the Billboard Latin Pop Albums chart, having been number one for 13 weeks. On the Billboard 200 chart it peaked at number fourteen, with sales of over 57,000 units within the first week—a record at that time for a Spanish-language album. It was also Luis Miguel's highest-peaking album in the Billboard 200 until the release of Cómplices in 2008, which peaked at number ten. It was the second best-selling Latin album in the United States during 1997, after Tango by Julio Iglesias. As of October 2017, it has sold 687,000 copies in the US, making it the 19th bestselling Latin album in the country according to Nielsen SoundScan. By October 1997 it had sold over a million copies in Mexico and was certified quadruple platinum in the country, as well as across Central America. A year after release it received a platinum certification in the United States by the RIAA. In Argentina it reached number one on the CAPIF albums chart and was the best-selling album of 1997 in the country, with sales of approximately 781,000 copies. In Spain the album reached number one on the PROMUSICAE chart and was certified nonuple platinum, selling over 900,000 copies. In South America the album was certified gold in Brazil, Platinum in Ecuador and Peru, double platinum in Colombia and Paraguay, sextuple platinum in Venezuela, octuple platinum in Chile, and diamond in Argentina. According to the Guinness World Records Romances was the best-selling Spanish-language album of 1997. A DVD-Audio for the album was released in 2001. Over 4.5 million copies of the album were sold in 53 countries, as of 1999.

== Legacy ==
Warner Music released a three-disc compilation album titled Todos Los Romances ("All The Romances") in 1998, which contains all the tracks from Luis Miguel's Romance albums. The album peaked at number twelve in the Billboard Top Latin Albums chart and at number six in the Billboard Latin Pop Albums chart. It was certified gold in Argentina. Romances was followed by one more bolero album, Mis Romances (2001) which was produced by Luis Miguel.

== Track listing ==
Romances track listing
No.	Title	Writer(s)	Year of composition	Length
1.	"Voy a Apagar la Luz / Contigo Aprendí"	Armando Manzanero	1960; 1967	4:11
2.	"Sabor a Mí"	Álvaro Carrillo	1959	3:06
3.	"Por Debajo de la Mesa"	Manzanero	1997	3:05
4.	"La Gloria Eres Tú"	José Antonio Mendez	1952	3:21
5.	"Amanecer"	Manzanero	1978	3:31
6.	"Encadenados"	Carlos Arturo Briz	1956	3:59
7.	"Bésame Mucho"	Consuelo Velázquez	1941	5:26
8.	"Contigo (Estar Contigo)"	Bebu Silvetti; Sylvia Riera Ibañez	1997	4:11
9.	"Noche de Ronda"	Agustín Lara	1940	4:16
10.	"El Reloj"	Roberto Cantoral	1956	3:02
11.	"Júrame"	María Grever	1959	3:57
12.	"De Quererte Así (De T'Avoir Aimee)"	Charles Aznavour; Alex Marco (adapt.)	1958	3:14
13.	"Uno"	Enrique Santos Discepolo; Marianito Mores	1943	4:48
14.	"Mañana de Carnaval (Manhã de Carnaval)"	Luiz Bonfá; Antonio Maria (adapt.); Jesus María Arozamena	1960	4:07

== Personnel ==
Adapted from AllMusic and the Romances liner notes:

=== Performance credits ===
Bass

- Sue Ranney
- Drew Dembowski
- Donald Ferrone
- Richard Feves
- Ed Meares
- Bruce Morgenthaler

Cello

- Dennis Karmazyn
- Suzie Katayama
- Miguel Martinez
- Jodi Burnett
- Larry Corbett
- Christine Ermacoff
- Todd Hemmenway
- Jimbo Ross
- David Shamban
- Nancy Stein-Ross

Viola

- Bob Becker – viola
- Denyse Buffman – viola
- Matt Funes – viola
- Keith Greene – viola
- Janet Lakatos – viola
- Denyse Buffum – viola
- Marlow Fisher – viola
- Carrie Holzman – little viola
- Jorge Moraga – viola
- Harry Shirinian – viola
- John Scanlon – viola

Violin

- Eun Mee Ahn
- Richard Altenbach
- Becky Barr
- Jacqueline Brand
- Roman Volodarsky
- Roger Wilkie
- Tiffany Yihu
- Armen Garabedian
- Berj Garabedian
- Endre Granat
- Alan Grunfield
- Pat Johnson
- Karen Jones
- Peter Kent
- Ezra Kliger
- Razdan Kuyumjian
- Natalie Leggett
- Dimitrie Leivici
- Mike Markaman
- Darius Campo
- Joel Derouin
- David Ewart
- Robin Olson
- Carolyn Osborn
- Sid Page
- Diana Halprin
- Tommy Hatwan
- Gil Romero
- Jay Rosen
- Anatoly Rosinsky
- Sheldon Sanov
- Barbara Porter
- Kwihee Shambanari

Vocals For "La Gloria Eres Tu"

- Dan Navarro
- Steve Real

For "Bésame Mucho"

- Francis Benítez
- Zeila Hoyle
- Isela Sotelo
- Gisa Vatcky

Additional musicians

- Abraham Laboriel - Bass Guitar
- Alex Acuña – percussion
- John Bilezikjian – mandolin
- Earl Dumler – oboe
- Ramon Flores – trumpet
- Jorge "Coco" Trivisonno – bandoneon
- Carlos Vega – drums
- Richie Gajate Garcia – percussion
- Grant Geissman – acoustic guitar
- Alan Kaplan – trombone
- Jon Kurnick – mandolin
- Don Markese – tenor saxophone
- Frank Marocco – accordion
- Bill Reichenbach Jr. – trombone
- Ben Bressel – mandolin
- Charlie Davis – trumpet
- Bruce Dukov – concert master, violin
- Dean Parks – acoustic guitar
- Dan Higgins – alto saxophone
- Michito Sánchez – percussion
- Ramón Stagnaro – requinto
- Greg Smith – baritone saxophone

=== Technical credits ===
- Alejandro Asensi – art coordinator, production coordination
- Greg Burns – assistant engineer, mixing assistant
- Daniela Federici – photography
- Marco Gamboa – assistant engineer, mixing assistant
- Mauricio Guerrero – mixing
- Jac Holzman – mixing producer
- Keith Holzman – production coordination
- Armando Manzanero – art direction, composer
- Ron McMaster – mastering
- Luis Miguel – producer
- Gabrielle Raumberger – graphic design
- John Rod – assistant engineer, mixing assistant
- Benny Faccone– engineer, mixing
- Sander Selover – pro-tools
- Bebu Silvetti – arranger, composer, mixing producer, musical direction, piano, synthesizer
- Jeremy Smith – engineer
- H. Thompson – assistant engineer, mixing, mixing assistant

== Charts ==
=== Weekly charts ===
Weekly chart performance for Romances
Chart (1997–98)	Peak position
Argentine Albums (CAPIF)	1
Brazilian Albums (Sucesso)	30
European Albums (Music & Media)	47
Spanish Albums (AFYVE)	1
US Billboard 200	14
US Top Latin Albums (Billboard)	1
US Latin Pop Albums (Billboard)	1

=== Monthly charts ===
Monthly chart performance for Romances
Chart (1997)	Peak position
Argentine Albums (CAPIF)	1

=== Year-end charts ===
Year-end chart performance for Romances
Chart (1997)	Position
Argentine Albums (CAPIF)	1
Mexican Albums (AMPROFON)	1
Spanish Albums (AFYVE)	10
US Top Latin Albums (Billboard)	2
US Latin Pop Albums (Billboard)	3

Chart (1998)	Position
Spanish Albums (AFYVE)	16
US Top Latin Albums (Billboard)	6
US Latin Pop Albums (Billboard)	4

== Certifications and sales ==
Region	Certification	Certified units/sales
Argentina (CAPIF)	Diamond	781,000
Bolivia	2× Platinum	
Brazil (Pro-Música Brasil)	Gold	200,000
Central America (CFC)	4× Platinum	
Chile (IFPI)	8× Platinum	433,000
Colombia (ASINCOL)	2× Platinum	88,000
Ecuador (IFPI)	Platinum	
Mexico (AMPROFON)	4× Platinum+2× Gold	1,675,000
Paraguay (IFPI)	2× Platinum	
Peru (IFPI)	Platinum	
Spain (Promusicae)	9× Platinum	1,000,000
United States (RIAA)	Platinum	687,000
Venezuela (APFV)	6× Platinum	
Summaries
Argentina & Mexico Sales in 1997	—	2,000,000
Asia-Pacific	—	50,000
Worldwide Worldwide sales up to 1999	—	4,500,000

== See also ==
- 1997 in Latin music
- List of best-selling albums in Argentina
- List of best-selling albums in Chile
- List of best-selling albums in Mexico
- List of best-selling albums in Spain
- List of best-selling Latin albums
- List of best-selling Latin albums in the United States
- List of diamond-certified albums in Argentina
- List of number-one Billboard Top Latin Albums from the 1990s
- List of number-one albums of 1998 (Spain)
