= Only You (Yazoo song) =

1982 single by Yazoo

Single by Yazoo

from the album Upstairs at Eric's
- B-side: "Situation" (UK); "Winter Kills" (US)
- Released: 15 March 1982
- Recorded: January 1982
- Genre: Synth-pop; new wave; experimental pop; electropop
- Length: 3:11
- Label: Mute
- Songwriter: Vince Clarke
- Producers: Eric Radcliffe, Daniel Miller, Yazoo (1982); Eric Radcliffe, Yazoo (1999)

Yazoo singles chronology
"Only You" (1982)	"Don't Go" (1982)

Music video
- "Only You" (1999 Remix) on YouTube

"Only You" is a song by British synth-pop duo Yazoo. It was written by member Vince Clarke, while he was still with Depeche Mode, but recorded in 1982 after he formed Yazoo with Alison Moyet. It was released as Yazoo's first single on 15 March 1982 in the United Kingdom, taken from their first album, Upstairs at Eric's (1982), and became an instant success on the UK Singles Chart, peaking at number two on 16 May 1982. It also reached the top 10 in Ireland and Australia. In the US, "Only You" was released as the band's second single in November 1982 and charted at number 67 on the Billboard Hot 100. It also made the Billboard Adult Contemporary chart (number 38).

A remix of "Only You" made the UK top 40 again in 1999, while reaching number 16 on the US Billboard Hot Dance Music/Club Play chart. The music video for the new version was created using the Houdini 3D animation software package.

The Flying Pickets recorded an a cappella cover of "Only You" which was the Christmas number one in the UK in December 1983. It also reached number 17 in Canada in April 1984.

Becky Hill released a stripped-back version which featured in the McDonald's Christmas ad for 2022. 10 pence from every download of Hill's version in the UK until spring 2023 was donated to BBC Children in Need. The track went on to become Hill's tenth top 40 record and has accumulated over 9.9 million streams to date.

== Recording ==
In 1981, English musician Vince Clarke left the electronic band Depeche Mode, citing touring fatigue and disdain for pop stardom as his reasons for the departure. Clarke was worried Mute Records would drop him as a result, and decided to write for the label a song called "Only You". Clarke originally wrote the music for the song on a guitar, and transposed the riff into synthesizer notes. While writing the lyrics, Clarke remarked "It was a very simple arrangement. I just formed words on a piece of paper. I was just hoping Daniel Miller, Mute Records founder, would like it". Although often stated otherwise, Clarke denied having offered the song to Depeche Mode.

Clarke had written "Only You" as a sentimental ballad, and wanted to find a vocalist who could sing with emotion. Around this time, the rhythm and blues band The Screamin' Ab Dabs split, and singer Alison Moyet placed an ad in Melody Maker looking for a new band. Clarke had heard Moyet perform with a few other bands in the pub circuit, and felt she was a good fit for the song. He responded to the ad and asked Moyet if she was interested in singing for a demo. Moyet was reluctant at first, as she never aspired to perform pop songs, and stated: "A part of me was thinking I'll never hear the end of it if I go and sing with this pretty boy". She eventually agreed, saying she needed the money and had no way of making a demo on her own.

Clarke recorded the demo of "Only You" on a four-track tape recorder, and had already finished the backing track when Moyet arrived. Once the demo was finished, Clarke presented it to Miller, who at first found it to be uninteresting. That evening, publishing associates from Scandinavia heard the demo and liked it, which Clarke noted may have influenced Miller's opinion of the song. About a week later, Miller called Clarke and told him that he and Moyet should rerecord the song as a group and release it as a single. Moyet was surprised by the news, as neither she nor Clarke had intended to start a band together. The two knew virtually nothing about each other besides musical abilities, and Moyet described the pairing as "almost like an arranged marriage". Regardless, the newly formed duo recorded "Only You" at Blackwing Studios. Eric Radcliffe produced the song, along with Clarke and Miller.

== Composition ==
"Only You"
An 18-second sample of "Only You" demonstrating the synth layering of the music and soulful style of Alison Moyet's singing.

"Only You" is a synth-pop and new wave song with a tempo of 108 beats per minute. The song features an arpeggio chord progression, and is composed in the key of A major. When asked about the song, Moyet said: "'Only You' has a nursery rhyme simplicity and a lack of pretension. You don't need to be a great instrumentalist to play it. It's a universal, everyman song." Marcos Hassan of Tiny Mix Tapes agreed with this statement. He wrote that although "Only You" is a traditional synth-pop song, its softer and intimate sound is more reminiscent of Motown records, and ultimately described the song as "a warm and familiar extraterrestrial creature". Stewart Mason of AllMusic noted the use of layered melodies performed on multiple monophonic synthesizers, which add what he called "depth and melodic substance" to the song.

NME's Priva Elan wrote that the song may have initially been about Clarke's uneasy relationship with Depeche Mode, but Moyet turned the lyrics into the story of a person "looking through a scrapbook of photo-like memories". Moyet's soulful, almost masculine vocals span a tonal range of F♯_{3} to D_{4}. Mason compared Moyet's vocals to those of 1970s singer Ann Peebles.

== Release and chart performance ==
"Only You" was released in March 1982, as a 7" and 12" single. It was the first single from their debut album Upstairs at Eric's, and was paired with the B-side "Situation". The cover art for "Only You" featured an illustration of an American football player running with the ball.

"Only You" debuted at number seventy-two on the UK Singles Chart, on 11 April. Over the next few weeks, the song steadily climbed the chart, and on 16 May peaked at number two, only behind the Eurovision winning song "A Little Peace". "Only You" stayed within the top ten for the next three weeks, after which it began to drop in position. It spent fourteen weeks on the chart, and last appeared on 11 July. During its chart run, "Only You" was certified silver by the British Phonographic Industry, denoting shipments of 250,000 copies.

In the United States, "Only You" debuted at number ninety on the Billboard Hot 100 on 26 February 1983. The song slowly rose in positions, and on 19 March peaked at number sixty-seven, where it remained for three weeks. It spent eight weeks on the chart, and last appeared on 16 April.

== Critical reception ==
Upon its release, Richard Cook of NME noted that "Only You" "could quite easily have emanated from Depeche Mode" and added, "The emotional dial is on yearning and it trips through a melodic multiplication table that charms a passage to the heart by the end." Betty Page of Sounds called it an "incongruous but addictive mix of distinctive Clarkian techno-melodies and rich is-it-a-she-or-a-he raspy R'n'B vocals from Alf". Sunie, writing for Record Mirror, felt that the song was "60s-derived" and noted, "Lovely stuff it is, too, though in parts it's naggingly reminiscent of 'Do That to Me One More Time'."

The song was ranked at number 7 among the top ten "Tracks of the Year" for 1982 by NME, and in 2012 the website ranked it at number 8 on their list of the Greatest Pop Songs in History.

== Track listing ==
- 7": Mute/7 MUTE 20 (UK)
1. "Only You" – 3:10
2. "Situation" – 2:22
- 7": Sire/9 2-98447 (US)
1. "Only You" – 3:10
2. "Winter Kills" – 4:01
- 12": Mute/12 MUTE 20 (UK)
1. "Only You" – 3:10
2. "Situation" (extended version) – 5:20
- CD: Mute/CD MUTE 20 (UK)
1. "Only You" – 3:10
2. "Situation" – 2:26
3. "Situation" (extended version) – 5:20

(*) CD released on 30 September 1996

== Charts ==
=== Weekly charts ===
Weekly chart performance for "Only You"
Chart (1982)	Peak position
Australia (Kent Music Report)	6
Belgium (Ultratip Flanders)	39
Iceland	6
Ireland (IRMA)	5
Italy (Musica e dischi)	21
Portugal (AFP)	18
Spain (AFYVE)	19
UK Singles (OCC)	2
US Billboard Hot 100	67
US Adult Contemporary Chart (Billboard)	38
West Germany (Official German Charts)	72
Zimbabwe (ZIMA)	3
Chart (1999)	Peak position
Sweden (Sverigetopplistan)	47
UK Singles (OCC)	38
Chart (2021)	Peak position
Hungary (Single Top 40)	19

=== Year-end charts ===
Year-end chart performance for "Only You"
Chart (1982)	Position
Australia (Kent Music Report)	34

== Certifications ==
Region	Certification	Certified units/sales
United Kingdom (BPI)	Platinum	600,000^{‡}
^{‡} Sales+streaming figures based on certification alone.

== Use in film and television ==
"Only You" features in the films Can't Hardly Wait and The Chocolate War, and the closing scenes of the final episode of the British TV series The Office. The song is played during the romantic boat ride in the 2013 romcom Austenland and in the closing scene of The Americans episode "Dimebag", in the closing scene of the Lucifer episode "High School Poppycock", the Once Upon a Time episodes "The Price" and "Dreamcatcher" (and lends its title to the 22nd episode of the fifth season), the Fringe episode "Transilience Thought Unifier Model-11", and over the closing scenes and credits of episode 3 of the BBC/Hulu mini-series Normal People.

An a cappella version, similar to The Flying Pickets, is performed by the cast in the 2019 film Military Wives. In episode 7 of The Penguin ("Top Hat"), the song is playing in the background when young Oz returns home to his mother after leaving his brothers in the abandoned train station. Coinciding with the date of The Flying Pickets' cover of the song, Christmas 1983 is when Ritchie and Jill sing their version of the song in the second episode of 2021's It's a Sin.

== Cover versions ==
=== The Flying Pickets version ===
"Only You"

Single by the Flying Pickets

from the album Lost Boys
- Released: November 1983
- Recorded: 1983
- Genre: A cappella
- Length: 3:15
- Label: Virgin
- Songwriter: Vince Clarke
- Producers: The Flying Pickets, John Sherry Sonet

The Flying Pickets singles chronology
"Only You" (1983)	"When You're Young and in Love" (1984)

Audio video
- "Only You" on YouTube

An a cappella version by the Flying Pickets was even more successful than the 1982 original on the UK Singles Chart, being released towards the end of the following year and becoming the Christmas number one in 1983. It spent five weeks at the top. This made "Only You" the first a cappella chart-topper in the UK. The song was also the 1983 Christmas number one in Ireland. It was released in other overseas markets the following year.

The Flying Pickets version went on to become a number one hit on the West German Singles Chart in 1984, and also charted in Canada, though it did not chart in the United States. The song also spent 5 weeks atop the Irish Singles Chart, also becoming a Christmas number one. The song is also used at the end of Wong Kar-wai's 1995 film Fallen Angels.

The Flying Pickets version was reportedly one of then-Prime Minister Margaret Thatcher's favourite songs, a fact that has been noted with irony, due to the band's socialist views and support of the 1984–1985 miners' strike which Thatcher opposed.

This cover was also used in the 2024 and 2025 Vodafone Christmas advertisements in the UK.

==== Track listing ====
- 7" single 10,106,103 (1983)
- 7" single 10 TEN 14 (1983)
1. "Only You" – 3:20
2. "Disco Down" – 3:27

==== Charts ====
Chart (1983–1984)	Peak position
Australia (Kent Music Report)	61
Austria (Ö3 Austria Top 40)	3
Belgium (Ultratop Flanders)	3
Canada Top 50 Singles (RPM)	17
Ireland (IRMA)	1
Netherlands (Single Top 100)	5
New Zealand (Recorded Music NZ)	9
Sweden (Sverigetopplistan)	3
Switzerland (Schweizer Hitparade)	2
UK Singles (OCC)	1
West Germany (Official German Charts)	1

=== Enrique Iglesias version ===
"Solo En Ti"

Single by Enrique Iglesias

from the album Vivir
- Released: 17 February 1997
- Recorded: 1996
- Genre: Latin pop
- Length: 3:31
- Label: Fonovisa
- Songwriters: Vince Clarke; Enrique Iglesias
- Producer: Rafael Pérez-Botija

Enrique Iglesias singles chronology
"Enamorado Por Primera Vez" (1996)	"Solo En Ti" (1997)	"Miente" (1997)

Music video
- "Sólo En Tí (Only You)" on YouTube

Spanish singer-songwriter Enrique Iglesias recorded a Spanish version of the song, which was featured on his second studio album Vivir (1997), released by Fonovisa on 17 February 1997. The track was released as the second single from the album and debuted at number one on the U.S. Billboard Hot Latin Tracks chart on 3 May 1997 (his second in a row, and the first artist to do so), and spent ten non-consecutive weeks at the top. Iglesias also recorded the song in English, which is included on the album Bailamos Greatest Hits (1999).

==== Track listing ====
1. "Only You" (English) 3:30
2. "Solo En Ti" (Spanish) 3:29
3. "Solo En Ti/Only You" (Spanglish) 3:30

==== Charts ====
Chart (1997)	Peak position
US Hot Latin Tracks (Billboard)	1
US Latin Pop Airplay (Billboard)	1
US Latin Regional Mexican Airplay (Billboard)	4
US Latin Tropical/Salsa Airplay (Billboard)	6

=== Kylie Minogue & James Corden version ===
"Only You"

Single by Kylie Minogue with James Corden

from the album Kylie Christmas
- Released: 9 November 2015
- Recorded: 2015
- Studio: Angel Recording Studios (London, England); Sarm Music Village (London, England); Westlake Recording Studios (Hollywood, CA)
- Genre: Christmas
- Length: 3:05
- Label: Parlophone
- Songwriter: Vince Clarke
- Producer: Steve Anderson

Kylie Minogue singles chronology
"The Other Boys" (2015)	"Only You" (2015)	"100 Degrees" (2015)

James Corden singles chronology
"Shout" (2010)	"Only You" (2015)	"The Greatest Gift" (2016)

Lyric video
- "Only You" on YouTube

"Only You" is the lead single from Kylie Minogue's 2015 album, Kylie Christmas. Minogue and James Corden (who have been friends since 2009) reportedly saw the duet as a novelty inclusion for the album. However, it was elevated to single status.

==== Charts ====
Chart (2015)	Peak position
Belgium (Ultratip Bubbling Under Flanders)	22
Belgium (Ultratip Bubbling Under Wallonia)	40
Scottish Singles Sales (Official Charts)	74
UK Singles (OCC)	155
UK Singles Downloads (Official Charts)	59

==== Release history ====
Region	Date	Format(s)	Label	Ref.
Worldwide	9 November 2015	Digital download	Parlophone	

=== Selena Gomez version ===
"Only You"

Song by Selena Gomez

from the album 13 Reasons Why (A Netflix Original Series Soundtrack)
- Released: 30 March 2017
- Length: 3:04
- Label: Interscope
- Songwriter: Vince Clarke
- Producer: Eskmo

Lyric video
- "Only You" on YouTube

A cover version performed by Selena Gomez was included on the soundtrack for 13 Reasons Why (2017), a series adaptation of the eponymous book. Its official lyric video was uploaded to Gomez's Vevo account on 18 April 2017.

==== Charts ====
Chart (2017)	Peak position
Swedish Heatseeker (Sverigetopplistan)	12
UK Singles Downloads (Official Charts)	99

==== Certifications ====
Region	Certification	Certified units/sales
Brazil (Pro-Música Brasil)	Gold	30,000^{‡}
^{‡} Sales+streaming figures based on certification alone.

== See also ==
- List of number-one singles (UK)
- List of number-one Billboard Hot Latin Tracks of 1997
- List of Christmas number one singles (UK)
