= 2014 in Latin music =

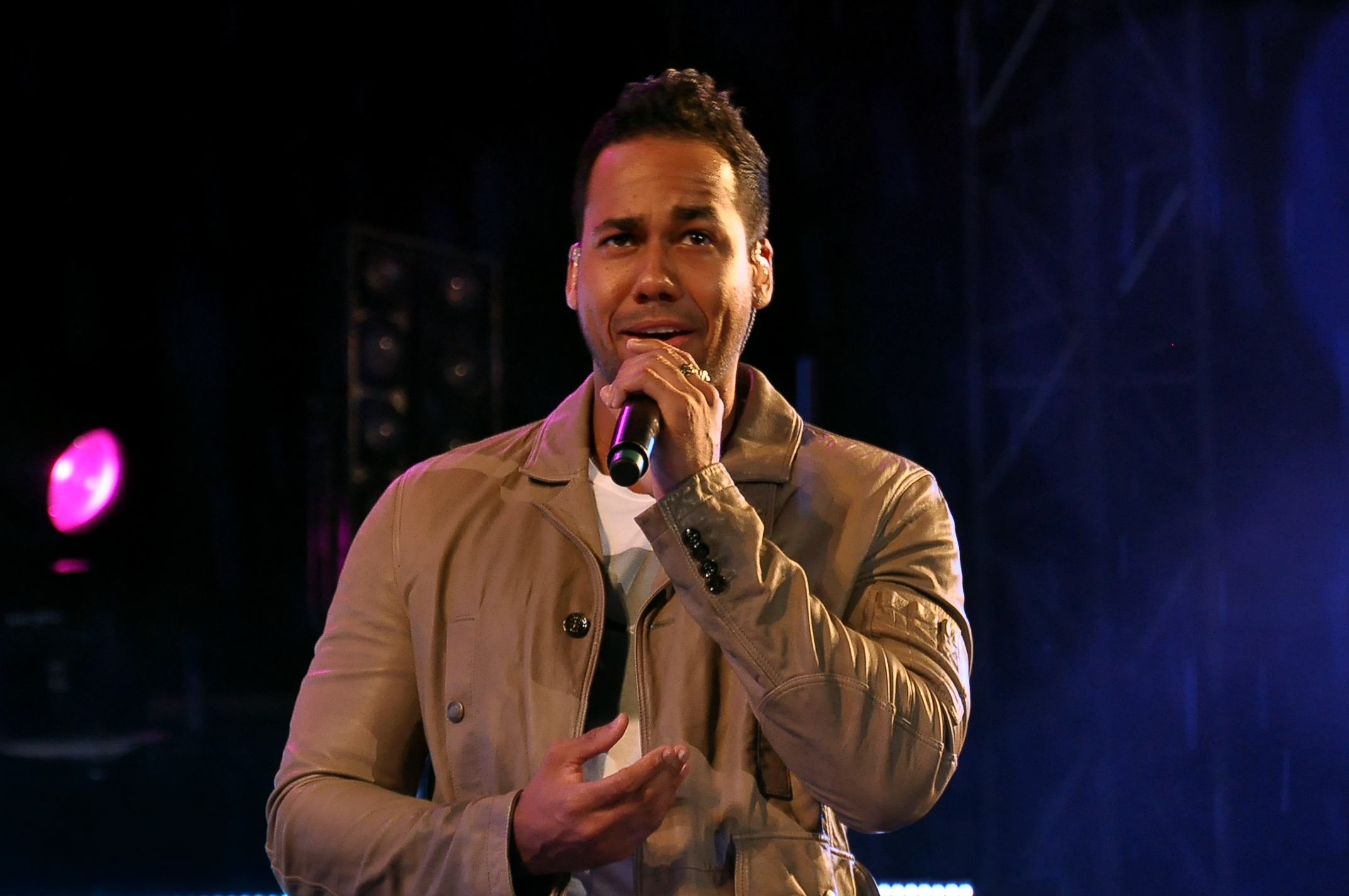
American singer-songwriter Romeo Santos was named Top Latin Artist of the Year in the United States by Billboard.

This is a list of notable events in Latin music (i.e. Spanish- and Portuguese-speaking music from Latin America, Europe, and the United States) that took place in 2015.

== Events ==
- May 7 – Argentine singer-songwriter Teresa Parodi is appointed her country's first Minister of Culture following the president's decision to promote the Culture Secretariat to a cabinet-level ministry.
- July 30 – Telemundo announces that it has acquired the rights to produce a Spanish-language version of the American Music Awards from the Dick Clark Productions. The inaugural awards show is planned to air in fall 2015.
- October 29 — "Bailando" by Enrique Iglesias, Gente de Zona, and Descemer Bueno breaks the record for the longest-running song at number-one on the Billboard Hot Latin Songs chart, surpassing "La Tortura" by Shakira and Alejandro Sanz.
- November 19 — Joan Manuel Serrat is honored by the Latin Academy of Recording Arts & Sciences as the Person of the Year.
- November 20
  - 14th Annual Latin Grammy Awards
    - "Bailando" by Enrique Iglesias, Gente de Zona, and Descemer Bueno wins Song of the Year.
    - "Universos Paralelos" by Jorge Drexler and Ana Tijoux wins Record of the Year.
    - Paco de Lucía posthumously wins Album of the Year for Canción Andaluza.
    - Mariana Vega wins Best New Artist.

== Number-one albums and singles by country ==
- List of Hot 100 number-one singles of 2014 (Brazil)
- List of number-one songs of 2014 (Colombia)
- List of number-one albums of 2014 (Mexico)
- List of number-one albums of 2014 (Portugal)
- List of number-one albums of 2014 (Spain)
- List of number-one singles of 2014 (Spain)
- List of number-one Billboard Latin Albums from the 2010s
- List of number-one Billboard Hot Latin Songs of 2014
- List of number-one singles of 2014 (Venezuela)

== Awards ==
- 2014 Premio Lo Nuestro
- 2014 Billboard Latin Music Awards
- 2014 Latin Grammy Awards
- 2014 Tejano Music Awards

== Albums released ==
=== First quarter ===
==== January ====
| Day | Title | Artist | Genre(s) | Singles | Label |
|---|---|---|---|---|---|
| 7 | A Piazzolla A Ramírez | Facundo Ramírez | | | |
| 12 | Vale La Pena | El Tigrillo Palma | | | |
| 14 | El Vuelo Del Pez | Siddhartha | | | |
| 17 | Esto es Estopa | Estopa | | | |
| 20 | Calma Aí, Coração – Ao Vivo | Zeca Baleiro | | | |
| 21 | Territorio Buitre | Los Buitres de Culiacan Sinaloa | | | |
| 21 | Mundo de Ilusiones | Martin Castillo | | | |
| 21 | 50 Mentadas | Los Originales de San Juan | | | |
| 28 | Soy Lo Que Quiero... Indispensable | Julión Álvarez y Su Norteño Banda | | | |
| 28 | Dvorák: Symphony No. 2 – 3 Slavonic Dances | José Serebrier | | | |

==== February ====
| Day | Title | Artist | Genre(s) | Singles | Label |
|---|---|---|---|---|---|
| 4 | Seranata, Vol. 2 | Manny Manuel | | | |
| 8 | Tiempo | Linda Briceño | | | |
| 11 | XX Años | El Poder del Norte | | | |
| 11 | En Vivo & Sin Etiqueta | Los Angeles Negros | | | |
| 14 | Cazador | El Komander | | | |
| 15 | Mi Luna Mi Estrella | Conjunto Agua Azul | | | |
| 16 | Palo! Live | PALO! | | | |
| 18 | De Camino Pa' La Cima | J Alvarez | Reggaeton | | On Top of the World Music, Sony Music Latin |
| 18 | Enredo | Martinho da Vila | | | |
| 18 | Somos | Jarabe de Palo | | | |
| 18 | Sentimiento Anacobero | Alquimia | | | |
| 25 | Formula, Vol. 2 | Romeo Santos | Bachata, R&B | "Propuesta Indecente" "Odio" "Cancioncitas de Amor" "Eres Mía" "Yo También" "Hilito" "Necio" | Sony Music Latin |
| 25 | La Neta del Planeta | La Leyenda | | | |

==== March ====
| Day | Title | Artist | Genre(s) | Singles | Label |
|---|---|---|---|---|---|
| 1 | Multi_Viral | Calle 13 | | | |
| 3 | El Imperio Nazza: Top Secret Edition | Musicologo y Menes | Reggaeton | | El Cartel Records |
| 4 | La Esencia | Alexis & Fido | | | |
| 4 | Gigante Gentil | Erasmo Carlos | | | |
| 5 | En Directo desde el Teatro Arriaga | Fito & Fitipaldis | | | |
| 11 | Loco de Amor | Juanes | | | |
| 11 | Que Nadie Sepa | Cardenales de Nuevo León | | | |
| 18 | Sex and Love | Enrique Iglesias | Latin pop | "Finally Found You" "Turn the Night Up" "Loco" "Heart Attack" "El Perdedor" "I'm a Freak" "Bailando" "Noche y De Día" | Universal Republic |
| 18 | Tú y Yo | David Bisbal | | | |
| 18 | El Regreso del Sobreviviente | Wisin | | | |
| 18 | El Rinoceronte | Elefantes | | | |
| 18 | Drama Queen en Vivo | Paty Cantú | | | |
| 18 | Vengo | Ana Tijoux | | | |
| 21 | A Bailar | Lali | Pop, dubstep, hip-hop | "A Bailar" "Asesina" "Mil Años Luz" "Del Otro Lado" "Histeria" | Sony Music Argentina |
| 25 | Globall | 3Ball MTY | | | |
| 25 | Amor Amor | Conjunto Primavera | | | |
| 25 | Segue o Som | Vanessa da Mata | | | |
| 25 | Soltando al Perro | Jesse & Joy | Latin pop | "Mi Tesoro" | |
| 25 | La Iniciativa | Nena Guzman | | | |

=== Second quarter ===
==== April ====
| Day | Title | Artist | Genre(s) | Singles | Label |
|---|---|---|---|---|---|
| 1 | En Tus Manos | Los Rieleros del Norte | | | |
| 1 | In The Key Of Tango | Carlos Franzetti | | | |
| 1 | New Throned King | Yosvany Terry | | | |
| 1 | En Vivo | Siggno | | | |
| 1 | Innovando y Conquistando | Conjunto Atardecer | | | |
| 1 | En Vivo En Buenosaires | No Te Va Gustar | | | |
| 7 | Vivo por la Gloria | La Beriso | | | |
| 8 | Sergio George Presents Salsa Giants + EP Plus | Various artists | Salsa | "Bajo la Tormenta" | |
| 8 | Raíz | Lila Downs, Niña Pastori, and Soledad | | | |
| 8 | En Primera File – Día 2 | Cristian Castro | Latin pop | "Dejame Conmigo" | Sony Music Latin |
| 14 | Bailar en la Cueva | Jorge Drexler | | "Universos Paralelos" | |
| 15 | Coração A Batucar | Maria Rita | | | |
| 16 | Anderson Freire e Amigos | Anderson Freires | | | |
| 21 | Alma – Piano Music Of Argentina | Allison Brewster Franzetti | | | |
| 22 | Mi Niña | Roberto Tapia | | | |
| 22 | Sigue la Tradición | Los Ramones de Nuevo León | | | |
| 22 | O Piano de Antonio Adolfo | Antonio Adolfo | | | |
| 22 | Jugar Con Fuego | Juan Pinilla and Fernando Valverde | | | |
| 22 | Confesiones de un Corazón Agradecido | Coalo Zamorano | | | |
| 28 | Es el Tiempo de Dios | Nirlon Sánchez | | | |
| 29 | Viaje | Ricardo Arjona | | | |
| 29 | Canción Andaluza | Paco de Lucía | | | |
| 29 | Mano a Mano: Tangos a la Manera de Vicente Fernández | Vicente Fernández | | | |
| 29 | Lágrimas y Lluvia | Luz María | | | |
| 29 | Desde Arriba Todo Se Ve Diferente | Amor Mercy | | | |
| 29 | Eterna Alegria Ao Vivo | Alcione | | | |
| 29 | Tavinho Moura | Minhas Canções Inacabadas | | | |
| 29 | La Historia De Mis Manos | Banda Carnaval | | | |
| 29 | 8 | Luis Fonsi | Latin pop | "Corazón en la Maleta" "Llegaste Tú" | Universal Music Latino |

==== May ====
| Day | Title | Artist | Genre(s) | Singles | Label |
|---|---|---|---|---|---|
| 3 | Multishow Ao Vivo – Ivete Sangalo 20 Anos | Ivete Sangalo | | | |
| 6 | Corazón | Santana | | | |
| 6 | Mis 40 en Bellas Artes | Juan Gabriel | | | |
| 6 | The Offense of the Drum | Arturo O'Farrill and the Afro Latin Jazz Orchestra | | | |
| 6 | Toninho Ferragutti e Neymar Dias | Festa Na Roça | | | |
| 6 | Jen | Jencarlos Canela | | | |
| 10 | El Final Del Mundo Vol. II: Nada Es Imposible | Luz Verde | | | |
| 11 | Todo Empieza Sonando | Julio César | | | |
| 12 | Nheengatu | Titãs | Rock, punk rock | "Fardado" | Som Livre |
| 13 | Más Corazón Profundo | Carlos Vives | Tropipop | "El Mar de Sus Ojos" "Cuando Nos Volvamos a Encontrar" "Ella Es Mi Fiesta" "Las Cosas de la Vida" | Sony Music Latin |
| 13 | Amigo Velho | Falamansa | | | |
| 13 | Retour | La Ley | | | |
| 15 | El Color De Mi Locura... | Jorge Luis Chacín | | | |
| 19 | A Paso Firme | La Reunion Norteña | | | |
| 19 | El Simbolo y el Cuate | Joan Manuel Serrat and Joaquín Sabina | | | |
| 20 | Don Tetto | Don Tetto | | | |
| 20 | Verdade, Uma Ilusão | Marisa Monte | | | |
| 20 | Mi Héroe | Los Invasores de Nuevo León | | | |
| 29 | Hybrid Tango II | Tanghetto | | | |

==== June ====
| Day | Title | Artist | Genre(s) | Singles | Label |
|---|---|---|---|---|---|
| 3 | Elypse | Camila | Latin pop | "Decidiste Dejarme" "Perdón" | Sony Music Latin |
| 3 | Contigo | Calibre 50 | | | |
| 3 | Amor y Sexo | La Mafia | | | |
| 3 | Será Porque Te Amo | Codigo FN | | | |
| 10 | Agua Maldita | Molotov | | | |
| 10 | La Balanza | Noel Torres | | | |
| 10 | Clásicas De Ayer Y Siempre | Polo Urias y Su Máquina Norteña | | | |
| 10 | Mujeres Con Cajones | Albita, Eva Ayllón and Olga Cerpa | | | |
| 10 | Meus Quintais | Maria Bethânia | | | |
| 11 | El Asunto | Totó la Momposina | | | |
| 17 | Amor de Guerra | Optimo | | | |
| 18 | Ama-Zonas | Doctor Krápula | | | |
| 23 | Seguimos Soñando | Grupo Alamo | | | |
| 23 | Viva Kids – Volumen 1 | Thalía | | | |
| 24 | No Me Pidas Perdón | Banda Sinaloense MS de Sergio Lizárraga | | | |
| 24 | Tangos | Rubén Blades | | | |
| 24 | Sigues Siendo Dios | Marcos Witt | | | |
| 24 | 15 Anniversario | Mariachi Divas de Cindy Shea | | | |
| 26 | 3rd Element | Luisito Quintero | | | |

=== Third quarter ===
==== July ====
| Day | Title | Artist | Genre(s) | Singles | Label |
|---|---|---|---|---|---|
| 1 | 1969 - Siempre, En Vivo Desde Monterrey, Parte 2 | Jenni Rivera | | | |
| 1 | Mario Ortiz All Star Band 50th Anniversary | Mario Ortiz Jr. | | | |
| 1 | Voz y Guitarra | Ixya Herrera | | | |
| 1 | El Rey de los Borrachos | Lupillo Rivera | | | |
| 1 | Locales Calientes | Guasones | | | |
| 2 | Second Half | Emilio Solla and La Inestable de Brooklyn | | | |
| 4 | Camino | Gustavo Santaolalla | | | |
| 8 | Adicto A Ti | Grupo Bryndis | | | |
| 9 | Sinfónico | Fonseca | | | |
| 13 | Soy | Debi Nova | | | |
| 15 | Amor y Tango | Marianela Villalobos | | | |
| 15 | Balas, Rosas y Plomo | Revolver Cannabis | | | |
| 21 | El Eliades Que Soy | Eliades Ochoa and El Cuarteto Patria | | | |
| 21 | Ayahuasca Dreams | Ciro Hurtado | | | |
| 21 | La Llamada | Ismael Serrano | | | |
| 22 | Monarca | La Gusana Ciega | | | |
| 22 | Cruzando Territorio | La Energía Norteña | | | |
| 22 | Otra Vez En La Lista Negra: US – Mexico | Larry Hernandez | | | |
| 24 | The King is Back | Juan Magan | | | |
| 24 | Megatamainho | Gero Camilo | Rock, forró, samba, reggae | | Independent |
| 28 | En Vivo Gran Rex | Estelares | | | |
| 29 | Disfruté Engañarte | La Adictiva Banda San José de Mesillas | | | |

==== August ====
| Day | Title | Artist | Genre(s) | Singles | Label |
|---|---|---|---|---|---|
| 5 | Banda do Mar | Banda do Mar | | | |
| 5 | Alegre y Enamorado | El Dasa | | | |
| 5 | Homenaje A Tito Rodríguez | Rafael "Pollo" Brito | | | |
| 5 | Jazz Meets The Classics | Paquito D'Rivera | | | |
| 5 | Golpe Avisa | Cartel De Santa | | | |
| 5 | El Reencuentro en Vivo Vol. 2 | Los Invasores de Nuevo León | | | |
| 5 | Que Bonita Es la Vida | El Trono de Mexico | | | |
| 12 | Aquila | Pedro Capó | | | |
| 19 | El Dominio | MC DAVO | | | |
| 19 | Herança Popular | Arlindo Cruz | | | |
| 19 | Bossa Negra | Diogo Nogueira and Hamilton de Holanda | | | |
| 19 | En Vivo | Kany García | | | |
| 19 | Aplaudan en la Luna | Illya Kuryaki and the Valderramas | | | |
| 25 | En Todo Estaré | Chayanne | Latin pop | "Humanos a Marte" "Tu Respiración" "Madre Tierra (Oye)" | Sony Music Latin |
| 25 | Love & Sex | Plan B | Reggaeton | "Mi Vecinita" "Candy" "Zapatito Roto" | |
| 26 | Centenário Caymmi | Dorival Caymmi | | | |
| 29 | Caprichos | Hamilton de Holanda | | | |

==== September ====
| Day | Title | Artist | Genre(s) | Singles | Label |
|---|---|---|---|---|---|
| 1 | Supernova | Malta | | | |
| 2 | Son 45 | Ismael Miranda | Salsa | "Son 45" "Bajo, Piano & Bongo" | |
| 2 | Mexicano Hasta las Pampas 2 | Diego Verdaguer | | | |
| 2 | Piazzolla: Desde Estudios A Tangos | Octavio Brunetti and Elmira Darvarova | | | |
| 2 | Troilo 100 Años | Selección Nacional de Tango | | | |
| 8 | Flamboyán | Camila Luna | | | |
| 9 | Enemigo en Casa | Enigma Norteño | | | |
| 9 | Rainha dos Raios | Alice Caymmi | Música popular brasileira, rock | | Joia Moderna |
| 9 | Relax | Sie7e | | | |
| 9 | Rock and Roll Revolution | Fito Páez | | | |
| 10 | Al Son de Mi Corazón | Gusi | | | |
| 11 | Alucine | El Coyote y Su Banda Tierra Santa | | | |
| 16 | La Familia B Sides | J Balvin | | | |
| 16 | Alegria del Mariachi | Mariachi Los Arrieros Del Valle | | | |
| 16 | The Latin Side of Joe Henderson | Conrad Herwig ft. Joe Lovano | | | |
| 16 | Mi Vida en Vida | Remmy Valenzuela | | | |
| 16 | Si Dios Quiere Yo También | Amaia Montero | | | |
| 19 | El Fenómeno | La Maquinaria Nortena | | | |
| 23 | Equilibrio | Santiago Cruz | | | |
| 23 | Vivir | Bustamante | | | |
| 30 | Quiero Ser Tu Dueño | Luis Coronel | | | |
| 30 | Merengueando Los Clásicos | Manny Manuel | | | |
| 30 | Primera Fila Flans | Ilse, Ivonne & Mimi | | | |
| 30 | Dueña de Mi Amor | Los Gallitos | | | |
| 30 | Nocheros Trio | Los Nocheros | | | |

=== Fourth quarter ===
==== October ====
| Day | Title | Artist | Genre(s) | Singles | Label |
|---|---|---|---|---|---|
| 1 | Malditos pecadores | Moderatto | | | |
| 3 | Realidades | Los Tigres del Norte | | | |
| 6 | Amar En Paz | Estrella Morente & Niño Josele | | | |
| 7 | Jukebox (Primera Edicion) | Luis Enrique | Salsa | "Noche de Copas" "Tan Enamorados" | |
| 9 | El Tiempo Otra Vez Avanza | No Te Va Gustar | | | |
| 13 | Bendito | Blas Córdoba "El Kejío" and Chano Domínguez | | | |
| 13 | Verde Amarelo Negro Anil | Nilze Carvalho | | | |
| 15 | Habla Tu Espejo | El Cuarteto de Nos | | | |
| 15 | Como Águia | Bruna Karla | | | |
| 21 | Pepe Aguilar MTV Unplugged | Pepe Aguilar | | | |
| 21 | Vida Loka | Onze:20 | | | |
| 21 | Hijo Del Levante | El Barrio | | | |
| 22 | Hijos de La Tierra | Los Tekis | | | |
| 22 | 30 Años + 5 Días | Teresa Parodi | | | |
| 23 | El Karma | Ariel Camacho y Los Plebes Del Rancho | | | |
| 24 | Sencillamente | Jorge Celedón and Gustavo García | | | |
| 25 | Yo Soy la Fama | Ñejo | | | |
| 27 | Farruko Presenta: Los Menores | Farruko | | | |
| 27 | Senzu-Rah | Regulo Caro | | | |
| 27 | Irreversible | Tercer Cielo | | | |
| 27 | Sol-Te | Suricato | | | |
| 27 | Perdóname Mi Amor | Los Tucanes de Tijuana | | | |
| 28 | Y la Banda Sigue | Los Auténticos Decadentes | | | |
| 28 | Así Te Quiero Yo | Banda Tierra Sagrada | | | |
| 28 | Romántico y Rumbero | José Alberto "El Canario" | | | |
| 28 | Amores | Antonio Lauré | | | |
| 28 | Huyendo conmigo de mí | Fito & Fitipaldis | | | |
| 30 | Voy Tras de Ti con Todo | Emmanuel Y Linda | | | |
| 30 | El Antes Y El Después | La Poderosa Banda San Juan | | | |
| 30 | Frozen: Canciones de Una Aventura Congelada | Various artists | | | |

==== November ====
| Day | Title | Artist | Genre(s) | Singles | Label |
|---|---|---|---|---|---|
| 3 | Que Lindo es Puerto Rico | Various artists | | | |
| 4 | Amore Mio | Thalía | | | |
| 4 | Greatest Hits, Vol. 1 | Nicky Jam | | | |
| 4 | Amo | Miguel Bosé | | | |
| 4 | Al Fin Completa | Elida Reyna and Avante | | | |
| 4 | Aníbal Troilo 100 Años | Ariel Ardit | | | |
| 4 | Identities Are Changeable | Miguel Zenón | | | |
| 11 | Terral | Pablo Alborán | Latin pop | | |
| 11 | Todo Tiene Su Hora | Juan Luis Guerra y 4.40 | Bachata, merengue, salsa | "Tus Besos" "Todo Tiene Su Hora" "Muchachita Linda" "El Capitan" | Capitol Latin |
| 11 | Primera Fila – Hecho Realidad | Ha*Ash | | | |
| 11 | Vuelta al Sol | Sasha, Benny y Erik | | | |
| 11 | Último Acto | Vicentico | | | |
| 11 | Amor Futuro | Leonel García | | | |
| 14 | Aquí Estoy | Lucero | | | |
| 16 | Sinergia | Argentina | | | |
| 17 | Insano | Jamz | | | |
| 22 | #SiguedeModa | Checo Acosta | | | |
| 24 | Alta Jerarquía | Tito El Bambino | | | |
| 24 | Sigo Invicto | Silvestre Dangond and Lucas Dangond | | | |
| 24 | Sorriso Eu Gosto – Ao Vivo No Maracanãzinho | Sorriso Maroto | | | |
| 25 | Todo Es Ahora | Manolo García | | | |
| 25 | Nueva Era | La Fiebre | | | |
| 25 | Insular Ao Vivo | Humberto Gessinger | | | |
| 25 | Cabaré | Leonardo & Eduardo Costa | | | |
| 25 | Agradecido | Ricardo Montaner | | | |
| 25 | Un alumno más | Melendi | | | |
| Unknown Date | Alma Brasileira: Chamber Works by Radamés Gnattali | Débora Halász and Franz Halász | | | BIS |

==== December ====
| Day | Title | Artist | Genre(s) | Singles | Label |
|---|---|---|---|---|---|
| 1 | 1 Vida – 3 Historias: Metamorfosis – Despedida de Culiacán – Jenni Vive 2013 | Jenni Rivera | Banda, Norteno, Interview | | Fonovisa Records, Universal Music Latin Entertainment |
| 2 | Orígenes: El Bolero Volumen 3 | Café Quijano | Ballad, Bolero | | Warner Music Spain |
| 2 | Em Samba! Ao Vivo | Mart'nália | Samba, MPB | | Biscoito Fino |
| 8 | Bem Sertanejo | Michel Teló | MPB, Country | | Som Livre |
| 9 | Dejando Huella | Banda Rancho Viejo | | | Disa Latin Music |
| 9 | Levantando Polvadera | Voz de Mando | | | |
| 9 | Confidencias Reales | Alejandro Fernández | Ballad, Bolero, Mariachi, Vocal | | Universal Music Latino |
| 9 | Vendetta: First Round | Ivy Queen | Reggaeton, Bachata, Salsa | "Soy Libre" "Vamos A Guerrear" "Nací Para Amarte" "Vendetta" | Universal Music Latin Entertainment, Ivy Queen Musa Sound Corp, Siente Music, Filtro Group |
| 16 | Zodiacal | Siggno | | | |
| 16 | Jamón del medio | Andrés Calamaro | | | Warner Music Spain, Grabaciones Encontradas |
| 16 | El Privilegio | Alfredo Olivas | | | |
| 17 | Pesados vestigios | La Renga | | | La Renga Discos |
| 18 | Ao Vivo | Anderson Freire | Gospel | | MK Music |
| 19 | Mariachi Flor De Toloache | Mariachi Flor De Toloache | Bachata, Bolero, Conjunto, Cumbia, Folk, Mariachi, Norteno | | Not On Label (Flor De Toloache Self-Released) |

== Best-selling records ==
=== Best-selling albums ===
The following is a list of the top 10 best-selling Latin albums in the United States in 2014, according to Billboard.

| Rank | Album | Artist |
|---|---|---|
| 1 | Formula, Vol. 2 | Romeo Santos |
| 2 | Sex and Love | Enrique Iglesias |
| 3 | 3.0 | Marc Anthony |
| 4 | 1969 - Siempre, En Vivo Desde Monterrey, Parte 1 | Jenni Rivera |
| 5 | Corazón | Santana |
| 6 | Archivos de Mi Vida | Gerardo Ortíz |
| 7 | Las Bandas Romanticas de America 2014 | Various artists |
| 8 | Soy el Mismo | Prince Royce |
| 9 | Gracias Por Estar Aquí | Marco Antonio Solís |
| 10 | Radio Éxitos: El Disco del Año 2013 | Various artists |

=== Best-performing songs ===
The following is a list of the top 10 best-performing Latin songs in the United States in 2014, according to Billboard.

| Rank | Single | Artist |
|---|---|---|
| 1 | "Bailando" | Enrique Iglesias featuring Descemer Bueno and Gente de Zona |
| 2 | "Propuesta Indecente" | Romeo Santos |
| 3 | "Odio" | Romeo Santos featuring Drake |
| 4 | "El Perdedor" | Enrique Iglesias featuring Marco Antonio Solís |
| 5 | "Eres Mía" | Romeo Santos |
| 6 | "Darte un Beso" | Prince Royce |
| 7 | "6 AM" | J Balvin featuring Farruko |
| 8 | "Vivir Mi Vida" | Marc Anthony |
| 9 | "Adrenalina" | Wisin featuring Jennifer Lopez and Ricky Martin |
| 10 | "Hermosa Experiencia" | Banda Sinaloense MS de Sergio Lizárraga |

== Deaths ==
- January 2 – Simone Bosé, 51, president of Universal Music Iberian Peninsula
- January 6 — Nelson Ned, 66, Brazilian singer, pneumonia.
- January 21 — Tony Pabón, 74, American singer, trumpeter and bandleader.
- January 26 — Juanita Garica, 84, tejano music hall of fame inductee, natural causes.
- February 12 — Santiago Feliú, 51, Cuban singer-songwriter, heart attack.
- February 19 — Simón Díaz, 85, Venezuelan singer and composer.
- February 25 — Paco de Lucía, 66, Spanish flamenco guitarist, heart attack.
- March 14 – Paulo Schroeber, 40, Brazilian guitarist (post-surgery complications)
- April 5 — Óscar Avilés, 90, Peruvian guitarist and singer.
- April 14
  - Júnior, 70, Filipino-born Spanish singer
  - Armando Peraza, 89, Cuban Latin jazz percussionist
- April 17 — Cheo Feliciano, 78, American Puerto Rican salsa and bolero composer and singer, traffic collision.
- April 19 — Sonia Silvestre, 61, Dominican singer and announcer, stroke.
- April 23 — Benjamín Brea, 67, Spanish-born Venezuelan musician, stomach cancer.
- May 1 — Juan Formell, 71, Cuban Grammy Award-winning musician, composer and director (Los Van Van).
- May 8 — Jair Rodrigues, 75, Brazilian musician and singer, heart attack.
- May 23 — Uña Ramos, 80, Argentine musician.
- May 29 — Tito Torbellino, 31, American banda singer and musician, shot.
- June 3 — Virginia Luque, 86, Argentine singer and actress.
- June 7 — Helcio Milito, 83, Brazilian musician.
- July 7 – Jaime Morey, 73, Spanish singer
- July 8 – Renato Capriles Venezuelan audio engineer (Los Melódicos)
- July 14 — Vange Leonel, 51, Brazilian singer, writer, feminist and LGBT activist, ovarian cancer.
- July 25 – Luis Fernando Muñoz Castro, 25, Mexican clarinetist
- August 3
  - Daladier Arismendi, 39, Colombian singer, stabbed.
  - Margot Loyola, 96, Chilean folk singer
- June 20 – María Luisa Landín, 92, Mexican singer
- August 4 — Rafael Santa Cruz, 53, Peruvian cajon musician and actor, heart attack.
- August 7 — Peret, 79, Spanish singer, guitarist and composer, lung cancer.
- August 24 – Cybele, 74, Brazilian vocalist (Quarteto em Cy)
- September 4 — Gustavo Cerati, 55, Argentine singer and musician (Soda Stereo), respiratory arrest.
- September 19 — Milton Cardona, 69, Puerto Rican jazz musician, heart failure.
- September 30 — Jadir Ambrósio, 91, Brazilian musician and composer.
- October 3 — Nati Cano, 81, Mexican-born American mariachi musician (Mariachi los Camperos), recipient of the National Heritage Fellowship (1990).
- October 30 – Jorge Saldaña, 83, Mexican music journalist and TV personality
- November 11 – Carlos Emilio Morales, 75, Cuban guitarist (Irakere)
- December 5 – Luis Herrera de la Fuente, 98, Mexican conductor
- December 19 – Luis Chi Sing, Mexican bassist for Marcos Witt
- December 21 — Horacio Ferrer, 81, Uruguayan/Argentine poet and tango lyricist.
- December 28 — Leopoldo Federico, 87, Argentine tango musician.
