= Sex and Love Tour =

2014–17 concert tour by Enrique Iglesias

- World tour by Enrique Iglesias
- Promotional poster for the tour
- Location: North America • South America • Africa • Asia • Europe
- Associated album: Sex and Love
- Start date: February 14, 2014
- End date: May 20, 2017
- Legs: 9
- No. of shows: 49 in North America; 14 in South America; 1 in Africa; 38 in Europe; 9 in Asia; 111 total

Enrique Iglesias concert chronology
- Enrique Iglesias & Jennifer Lopez Tour (2012); Sex and Love Tour (2014-17); Enrique Iglesias and Pitbull Live (2017)

The Sex and Love Tour was the tenth headlining concert tour by Spanish recording artist Enrique Iglesias. The tour supported his tenth studio album, Sex and Love (2014). Beginning in February 2014, Iglesias performed in the Americas, Asia, Africa, and Europe. The singer embarked on a separate co-headlining tour with Pitbull for shows in the United States and Canada.

== Opening acts ==
- Demi Lovato (Europe, select dates)
- David Vendetta (Alexandria)
- Juan Magan (Asunción, Lima)
- Dalí (Asunción)
- Pitbull (Lima)
- J Balvin (Lima)
- Joey Montana (Lima)
- Prince Royce (Lima)
- Gente De Zona (Quito)

== Setlist ==
The following setlist was obtained from the concert held on July 3, 2015 at the Auditorio Nacional in Mexico City, Mexico. It does not represent all concerts for the duration of the tour.

1. "Tonight (I'm Lovin' You)"
2. "I Like How It Feels"
3. "No Me Digas Que No"
4. "Bailamos"
5. "El Perdedor"
6. "Loco"
7. "Cuando Me Enamoro"
8. "Be With You"
9. "Tired of Being Sorry"
10. "Escape"
11. "Hero"
12. "Experiencia Religiosa"
13. "El Perdón"
14. "Bailando"
15. "I Like It"

== Tour dates ==
Date	City	Country	Venue
North America
February 14, 2014	San Juan	Puerto Rico	José Miguel Agrelot Coliseum
February 15, 2014^{[A]}	New York City	United States	Madison Square Garden
February 27, 2014	Mexico City	Mexico	Estadio Universitario
Latin America
May 2, 2014^{[B]}	Valledupar	Colombia	Parque de la Leyenda Vallenata
May 20, 2014	Santiago	Chile	Movistar Arena
May 22, 2014	Buenos Aires	Argentina	Estadio Luna Park
May 23, 2014	Buenos Aires	Argentina	Estadio Luna Park
May 29, 2014	Mexico City	Mexico	Auditorio Nacional
May 30, 2014	Mexico City	Mexico	Auditorio Nacional
June 1, 2014	Monterrey	Mexico	Auditorio Banamex
June 3, 2014	Zapopan	Mexico	Auditorio Telmex
June 4, 2014	Zapopan	Mexico	Auditorio Telmex
June 6, 2014	León	Mexico	Explanada Poliforum
June 8, 2014	Mérida	Mexico	Coliseo Yucatán
Africa
August 9, 2014	Alexandria	Egypt	Golf Porto Marina
North America
August 28, 2014	Panama City	Panama	Figali Convention Center
August 30, 2014	Punta Cana	Dominican Republic	Fillmore Ballroom
Europe
November 13, 2014	Barcelona	Spain	Palau Sant Jordi
November 15, 2014	Madrid	Spain	Barclaycard Center
November 18, 2014	Amsterdam	Netherlands	Ziggo Dome
November 20, 2014	Antwerp	Belgium	Sportpaleis
November 21, 2014	Paris	France	Palais Omnisports de Paris-Bercy
November 23, 2014	Dublin	Ireland	The O_{2}
November 25, 2014	Glasgow	England	SSE Hydro
November 27, 2014	Birmingham	England	National Indoor Arena
November 28, 2014	London	England	The O_{2} Arena
November 29, 2014	Manchester	England	Phones 4u Arena
December 2, 2014	Kaunas	Lithuania	Kaunas Arena
December 4, 2014	Saint Petersburg	Russia	Ice Palace
December 7, 2014	Riga	Latvia	Arēna Rīga
December 8, 2014	Tallinn	Estonia	Saku Suurhall
December 10, 2014	Helsinki	Finland	Hartwall Arena
December 13, 2014	Krasnogorsk	Russia	Crocus City Hall
South America
December 27, 2014^{[C]}	Cali	Colombia	Estadio Olímpico Pascual Guerrero
December 28, 2014^{[D]}	Cartagena	Colombia	Estadio Jaime Morón León
North America
February 12, 2015	Bakersfield	United States	Rabobank Arena
February 13, 2015	Los Angeles	United States	Staples Center
Latin America
April 4, 2015^{[E]}	Puerto San José	Guatemala	Km 100.5 Antigua Carretera
April 25, 2015	Asunción	Paraguay	Hipódromo de Asunción
May 1, 2015	Managua	Nicaragua	Estadio Nacional de fútbol
May 2, 2015	Alajuela	Costa Rica	Anfiteatro Coca-Cola
May 6, 2015	Veracruz	Mexico	Salones Tajín
May 7, 2015	Tuxtla Gutiérrez	Mexico	Estadio Víctor Manuel Reyna
May 21, 2015	Torreón	Mexico	Coliseo Centenario
May 22, 2015	San Luis Potosí	Mexico	El Domo
May 23, 2015	Morelia	Mexico	Plaza de Toros Monumental
May 28, 2015	Querétaro City	Mexico	Hipico de Juriquilla
May 30, 2015	Tijuana	Mexico	Plaza Monumental de Playas
July 3, 2015	Mexico City	Mexico	Auditorio Nacional
July 4, 2015	Mexico City	Mexico	Auditorio Nacional
July 5, 2015	Mexico City	Mexico	Auditorio Nacional
Europe
August 13, 2015^{[F]}	Marbella	Spain	Auditorio Starlite
August 16, 2015^{[G]}	Larvotto	Monaco	Salle des Étoiles
August 19, 2015	Istanbul	Turkey	KüçükÇiftlik Park
Asia
August 20, 2015^{[H]}	Ehden	Lebanon	Ehden Outdoor Music Hall
North America
September 4, 2015^{[I]}	Willemstad	Curaçao	Stage Sam Cooke
September 13, 2015^{[J]}	Las Vegas	United States	The Colosseum at Caesars Palace
September 14, 2015^{[J]}	Las Vegas	United States	The Colosseum at Caesars Palace
October 2, 2015	San Salvador	El Salvador	Estadio Cuscatlán
October 3, 2015	Guatemala City	Guatemala	Explanada Cardales de Cayala
October 10, 2015	Puebla	Mexico	Auditorio del CCU
October 13, 2015	Tampico	Mexico	Expo Tampico
October 14, 2015	Monterrey	Mexico	Auditorio Banamex
October 23, 2015	Hermosillo	Mexico	Foro de Conciertos y Espectaculos
October 24, 2015^{[K]}	Costa Mesa	United States	Universal Stage
South America
October 29, 2015	Guayaquil	Ecuador	Coliseo Voltaire Paladines Polo
October 31, 2015^{[L]}	Cuenca	Ecuador	Estadio Alejandro Serrano Aguilar
Latin America
November 7, 2015	La Romana	Dominican Republic	Anfiteatro Altos de Chavón
November 14, 2015	Buenos Aires	Argentina	Estadio G.E.B.A.
November 15, 2015^{[M]}	Villa María	Argentina	Anfiteatro Municipal de Villa María
November 20, 2015	Cochabamba	Bolivia	Estadio Félix Capriles
November 21, 2015	Lima	Peru	Estadio Nacional
Asia
November 27, 2015^{[N]}	Abu Dhabi	United Arab Emirates	du Arena
Europe
November 29, 2015	Barvikha	Russia	Barvikha Luxury Village Concert Hall
North America
December 3, 2015	León	Mexico	Poliforum León
December 4, 2015	Zapopan	Mexico	Auditorio Telmex
December 5, 2015^{[O]}	McAllen	United States	McAllen Veterans Memorial Stadium
Europe
December 13, 2015	Lisbon	Portugal	MEO Arena
December 14, 2015	Sofia	Bulgaria	Arena Armeec
Asia
December 16, 2015	Tel Aviv	Israel	Menora Mivtachim Arena
December 20, 2015	Colombo	Sri Lanka	CR & FC Grounds
December 22, 2015	Tel Aviv	Israel	Menora Mivtachim Arena
North America
February 11, 2016	Ledyard	United States	Grand Theater
February 12, 2016	Ledyard	United States	Grand Theater
February 20, 2016	Tehuixtla	Mexico	Foro al Aire "Libre Spectare"
Latin America
March 3, 2016	Quito	Ecuador	Coliseo General Rumiñahui
March 5, 2016^{[P]}	Mexico City	Mexico	Hipódromo de las Américas
Europe
May 8, 2016	Zagreb	Croatia	Arena Zagreb
May 10, 2016	Belgrade	Serbia	Kombank Arena
May 12, 2016	Bucharest	Romania	Romexpo
May 14, 2016	Sofia	Bulgaria	Arena Armeec
North America
June 4, 2016^{[Q]}	Wantagh	United States	Nikon at Jones Beach Theater
Europe
June 18, 2016^{[R]}	Baku	Azerbaijan	Baku Boulevard
June 20, 2016	Skopje	Macedonia	Boris Trajkovski Sports Center
North America
June 25, 2016^{[S]}	Oranjestad	Aruba	Harbor Square Arena
July 2, 2016^{[T]}	Tucson	United States	Anselmo Valencia Tori Amphitheater
Asia
August 11, 2016	Amman	Jordan	Amman Exhibition Park
Europe
August 13, 2016^{[G]}	Larvotto	Monaco	Salle des Étoiles
Asia
August 16, 2016^{[U]}	Antalya	Turkey	Antalya Exhibition Center
North America
September 16, 2016^{[J]}	Las Vegas	United States	The Colosseum at Caesars Palace
September 17, 2016^{[J]}	Las Vegas	United States	The Colosseum at Caesars Palace
Europe
December 14, 2016	Vienna	Austria	Wiener Stadthalle
December 16, 2016	Kraków	Poland	Tauron Arena
December 18, 2016	Prague	Czech Republic	Tipsport Arena
Asia
February 24, 2017^{[V]}	Dubai	United Arab Emirates	Dubai Media City Amphitheatre
April 15, 2017^{[W]}	Sakhir	Bahrain	Bahrain International Circuit
Europe
May 3, 2017	Stockholm	Sweden	Ericsson Globe
May 5, 2017	Berlin	Germany	Mercedes-Benz Arena
May 7, 2017	Helsinki	Finland	Hartwall Arena
North America
May 13, 2017^{[X]}	Morelia	Mexico	Teatro del Pueblo
Europe
May 17, 2017	Gdańsk	Poland	Ergo Arena
May 19, 2017	Bologna	Italy	Unipol Arena
May 20, 2017	Milan	Italy	Mediolanum Forum

Festivals and other miscellaneous performances

^{A} This concert was a part of "El Concierto de los Enamorados"
^{B} This concert was a part of the "Festival de la Leyenda Vallenata"
^{C} This concert was a part of the "Feria de Cali"
^{D} This concert was a part of the "Metroconcierto Histórico"
^{E} This concert was a part of the "Brahva Summer Fest"
^{F} This concert was a part of the "Starlite Festival"
^{G} This concert was a part of the "Monte-Carlo Sporting Summer Festival"
^{H} This concert was a part of the "Ehdeniyat International Festival"
^{I} This concert was a part of the "Curaçao North Sea Jazz Festival"
^{J} This concert was a part of the "Mexican Independence Day Celebration"
^{K} This concert was a part of "L Festival"
^{L} This concert was a part of "Fiestas de Cuenca"
^{M} This concert was a part of the "Festival Nacional de Peñas de Villa María"
^{N} This concert was a part of "Yasalam After-Race Concerts"
^{O} This concert was a part of the "McAllen Holiday Parade"
^{P} This concert was a part of "Starlite México"
^{Q} This concert was a part of "KTUphoria"
^{R} This concert was a part of the "Formula 1 Grand Prix Event"
^{S} This concert was a part of the "Aruba Summer Music Festival"
^{T} This concert was a part of the "Casino Del Sol Anniversary Weekend"
^{U} This concert was a part of "Expo 2016"
^{V} This concert was a part of the "Dubai International Jazz Festival"
^{W} This concert was a part of the "2017 Bahrain Grand Prix"
^{X} This concert was a part of "Expo Fiesta Michoacán"

=== Box office score data ===
Venue	City	Tickets sold / Available	Gross revenue
José Miguel Agrelot Coliseum	San Juan	10,440 / 12,000 (87%)	$757,408
Madison Square Garden	New York City	15,070 / 15,070 (100%)	$1,285,055
Auditorio Nacional	Mexico City	46,036 / 46,036 (100%)	$3,171,028
Auditorio Banamex	Monterrey	11,060 / 12,655 (87%)	$985,830
Auditorio Telmex	Zapopan	12,775 / 16,122 (79%)	$889,881
Coliseo Yucatán	Mérida	4,572 / 7,069 (65%)	$413,086
Sportpaleis	Antwerp	13,514 / 15,876 (85%)	$843,248
The O_{2}	Dublin	8,829 / 8,829 (100%)	$556,063
SSE Hydro	Glasgow	7,275 / 7,399 (98%)	$603,809
The O_{2} Arena	London	13,202 / 15,066 (88%)	$1,254,210
Phones 4u Arena	Manchester	11,905 / 11,905 (100%)	$933,686
The Colosseum at Caesars Palace	Las Vegas	15,845 / 15,845 (100%)	$2,124,021
Mercedes-Benz Arena	Berlin	11,591 / 12,660 (92%)	$550,120
TOTAL		182,114 / 196,532 (93%)	$14,367,445
