= Yasha Malekzad =

English music video director and producer

Yasha Malekzad (born 1 October 1984) is an English music video director and producer from Beccles, Suffolk, England, who has worked with international artists including Enrique Iglesias, Will Smith, Pitbull, Usher, Lil Wayne, Sharon Stone, Nicky Jam, the Wanted, Christina Milian, JLS, Tinchy Stryder, Romeo Santos, Lionel Richie, Era Istrefi, Paulina Rubio, Daley, Wisin, Ludacris, Roselyn Sanchez, Parker Ighile, Stafford Brothers, Camilla Belle and many more. He is also currently working on a long format documentary project on Olympic wrestling titled Pahlavan. Malekzad is the creative director of Artist Preserve, his production company and product placement agency, located in Chelsea, London.

== Early life ==
Yasha Malekzad, of Persian and English descent, was born into a creative family of dancers and musicians. He pursued a career as a music producer and graduated from De Montfort University with an honours degree in music production and innovation. Whilst making a living DJing and selling records, he fell into the world of film, first through producing music videos and then by directing them.

== Videography ==
Nicky Jam, Will Smith & Era Istrefi

- "Live It Up" Official Fifa World Cup 2018 Song starring Ronaldinho & Willian

Enrique Iglesias

- "Move to Miami" ft. Pitbull
- "Duele El Corazon" ft. Wisin
- "Heart Attack" starring Camilla Belle
- "Turn the Night Up"
- "Loco" ft. Romeo Santos, including cameos by Danny Trejo & Roselyn Sánchez
- "Dirty Dancer" ft. Usher & Lil Wayne
- "Ayer"
- "I Like How It Feels" ft. Pitbull
- "Tonight (I'm Fuckin' You)" ft Ludacris
- "Finally Found You" ft. Sammy Adams & Daddy Yankee
- "Heart Attack"
- "Bailando" ft. Descemer Bueno & Gente de Zona
- "Bailando" (English Version) ft. Descemer Bueno, Gente de Zona and Sean Paul
- "Subeme La Radio" ft. Descemer Bueno & Zion & Lennox
- "Noche y De Día" ft. Yandel & Juan Magan
- "El Baño" ft. Bad Bunny starring Eric Roberts

Paulina Rubio

- "Boys Will Be Boys"

Stafford Brothers ft Christina Milian & Lil Wayne

- "Hello"

Parker Ighile

- "So Beautiful"

Jodie Connor

- "Bring It"

Daley

- "Broken"
- "Alone Together"

Pahlavan – a documentary film telling wrestling's story.

== Awards ==
Best Music Video, 2011, Ev. Gerard Award, "Dirty Dancer"
Best Music Video, 2011, Los Premios 40 Principales Award, "Tonight (I'm Fuckin' You)"
Best Music Video, 2011, Univision’s Best of Music, "Tonight (I'm Fuckin' You)"
Los Premios 40 Prinpales, 2014, Best Spanish Video - "Bailando"
Latin Music Italian Awards, 2014, Best Latin Male Video of the Year - "Bailando"
Premios Juventud, My Favourite Music Video - "Bailando"
