= 2014 Premios Juventud =

11th Premios Juventud
- Date: July 17, 2014
- Location: Watsco Center in Coral Gables, Florida
- Hosted by: Ana Brenda Contreras, Cristián de la Fuente, Galilea Montijo
- Website: Official Page

Television/radio coverage
- Network: Univision

The 11th Annual Premios Juventud (Youth Awards) were broadcast by Univision on July 17, 2014.

== Awards and nominees ==
=== Music ===
La Combinación Perfecta	Lo Toco Todo
"El Perdedor" - Enrique Iglesias ft. Marco Antonio Solís; "6 AM" - J Balvin ft. Farruko; "Adrenalina" - Wisin ft. Ricky Martin & Jennifer López; "Habla bla bla" - Gloria Trevi & Shy Carter; "Loco" - Enrique Iglesias ft. Romeo Santos; "Odio" - Romeo Santos & Drake	"Fórmula Vol. 2" - Romeo Santos; "Archivos de mi vida" - Gerardo Ortíz; "Con la frente en alto" - Luis Coronel; "De Película" - Gloria Trevi; "La familia" - J Balvin; "Soy el mismo" - Prince Royce

=== Novelas ===
¡Está Buenísimo!	Chica Que Me Quita El Sueño
William Levy - La Tempestad; Daniel Arenas - Corazón Indomable; Jaime Camil - Qué pobres tan ricos; José Ron - La mujer del Vendaval; Sebastián Rulli - Lo que la vida me robó	Angelique Boyer - Lo que la vida me robó; Ana Brenda Contreras - Corazón Indomable; Ariadne Diaz - La mujer del Vendaval; Maite Perroni - Cachito de cielo; Ximena Navarrete - La Tempestad
Mejor Tema Novelero
"El Perdedor" - Enrique Iglesias featuring Marco Antonio Solís for Lo que la vida me robó; "Hoy tengo ganas de ti" - Alejandro Fernández featuring Christina Aguilera for La Tempestad; "Mi Tesoro" - Jesse & Joy for Qué pobres tan ricos; "Para Enamorarte de Mi" - David Bisbal for Por siempre mi amor; "Que Bonito Amor" - Vicente Fernandez for Qué bonito amor

=== Film ===
¡Qué Actorazo!	Actriz Que Se Roba La Pantalla
Eugenio Derbez; Antonio Banderas; Benicio del Toro; Diego Luna; Jaime Camil	Sofía Vergara; Kate del Castillo; Michelle Rodriguez; Salma Hayek; Zoe Saldaña
Película Más Padre
Fast & Furious 6; Filly Brown; Gravity; Instructions Not Included; Pulling Strings

== Pop culture ==
=== My Favorite DJ ===
Nominated	Result
Amos Morales	Nominated
Argelia Atilano	Nominated
Chiquibaby	Nominated
Enrique Santos	Won
Raúl Brindis	Nominated

=== Follow me The Good ===
Nominated	Result
Chiquis	Nominated
Larry Hernández	Nominated
Luis Coronel	Nominated
Prince Royce	Won
Romeo Santos	Nominated

== Sports ==
=== Most Electrifying Guy Jock ===
Nominated	Result
Javier "Chicharito" Hernández	Nominated
JJ Barea	Nominated
Lionel Messi	Won
Raúl Alonso Jiménez	Nominated
Saúl "El Canelo" Alvarez	Nominated

=== The New Pledge ===
Nominated	Result
Andy Najar	Nominated
Diego Antonio Reyes Rosales	Won
James David Rodríguez Rubio	Nominated
José Fernández	Nominated
Yasiel Puig	Nominated

== Special awards ==
- Supernova: Enrique Iglesias
- Idol of Generations Award: Pitbull
- The Best Dressed Award: Ana Brenda Contreras, Austin Mahone
