= Bailando (Enrique Iglesias song) =

2014 song by Enrique Iglesias

- Cover art for the English remix with Sean Paul.

Single by Enrique Iglesias featuring Descemer Bueno and Gente de Zona and/or Sean Paul or Luan Santana or Mickael Carreira

from the album Sex and Love
- Language: Spanish; English
- Released: 11 April 2014
- Recorded: 2012–13
- Genre: Latin pop; flamenco; dance
- Length: 4:03
- Label: Republic
- Songwriters: Enrique Iglesias; Descemer Bueno; Alexander Delgado; Randy Malcom Martinez; Sean Paul
- Producer: Carlos Paucar

Enrique Iglesias singles chronology
"I'm a Freak" (2014)	"Bailando" (2014)	"El Perdón" (2015)

Sean Paul singles chronology
"Come On to Me" (2014)	"Bailando" (2014)	"Dangerous Love" (2014)

Gente de Zona singles chronology
"Pinocho" (2013)	"Bailando" (2014)	"Tu Me Quemas" (2014)

Luan Santana singles chronology
"Eu Não Merecia Isso" (2014)	"Bailando" (2014)	"Escreve Aí" (2014)

Mickael Carreira singles chronology
"Viver a Vida" (2012)	"Bailando" (2014)	"Tudo O Que Tu Quiseres" (2014)

Bailando (Spanish edition)
- Cover of the Spanish version by Enrique Iglesias featuring Descemer Bueno and Gente de Zona

Music videos
- "Bailando" (Spanish Ver.) on YouTube
- "Bailando" (English Ver.) on YouTube
- "Bailando" (Brazilian Portuguese Ver.) on YouTube
- "Bailando" (Portugal Portuguese Ver.) on YouTube

"Bailando" (transl. "Dancing") is a song by Spanish singer-songwriter Enrique Iglesias for his tenth studio album Sex and Love (2014). Written by Iglesias with long-time collaborator Bueno, the first and Spanish version was released with Cuban artists Descemer Bueno and Gente de Zona. Shortly afterward, the official version of the song was released by Universal Republic Records as the sixth single from the album. The song spent 41 weeks at No. 1 on the Billboard Hot Latin Songs chart. "Bailando" was produced by Carlos Paucar.

As of 24 August 2014, there are three other versions of the song that have been released to the music market besides the original Spanish version. The Spanglish version features Jamaican singer Sean Paul. Iglesias also released two Portuguese versions of the song: one version of the song in Portuguese destined for Brazilian market with additional vocals by Brazilian singer Luan Santana, and the other Portuguese version destined for the Portuguese market featured the additional vocals of the Portuguese singer Mickael Carreira.

The original Spanish version of "Bailando" served as the theme song of the soap opera Reina de Corazones which aired on Telemundo. According to the IFPI, Bailando was the tenth best-selling song of 2014 with 8 million units (sales plus track-equivalent streams) worldwide.

== Background ==
In an interview Iglesias gave to Univision Musica, backstage at the Premios lo Nuestro he told the reporter that when Bueno presented the song to him, he initially did not like it and did not want to record it. But after recording he loved the song. He termed it as one of his favorites from the album.

== Music video ==
Accompanying music videos for both, the Spanish and the Spanglish versions of "Bailando" were filmed in Santo Domingo, Dominican Republic and Havana, Cuba. The video for Spanish version was premiered through Univision on 10 April 2014 and was premiered worldwide on 11 April 2014 through Iglesias' official Vevo account for the Spanglish version through Vevo on 13 June 2014, next the Brazil Portuguese version with Brazilian singer Luan Santana through Vevo on 7 July 2014, and the Portugal Portuguese version with Portugal singer Mickael Carreira on 22 August 2014 through Iglesias' official Vevo account too.

The music video is directed by Cuban producer Alejandro Perez, under Enrique Iglesias' longtime collaborators creative director Yasha Malekzad & executive producer Kasra Pezeshki. The music video was produced by Artist Preserve, London. The featured dancers are from Havana's Ballet Lizt Alfonso. The lead female dancer in the video is Ana Karla Suarez. The video production in the Dominican Republic was produced by Aquiles Jimenez. On YouTube, the Spanish version of the video has been viewed over 3.7 billion times while the English version of the video has received over 680 million views as of September, 2025. It is his most viewed video on YouTube, surpassing his 2010 hit "I Like It". The Spanish version of the video is the 35th most viewed video on YouTube. "Bailando" became the first Spanish-language music video to have been viewed over a billion times.

=== Synopsis ===
The video starts black and white in a living room, with Bueno playing parts of "Bailando" on guitar while Iglesias and Gente de Zona are having fun in the background, before starting to sing along with Bueno. As the song starts, Iglesias, Bueno and Gente de Zona walk, surrounded by working people and kids who juggle soccer balls. They are then seen performing the song in a tunnel, running through a street market and a troop of flamenco dancers showing off their moves at Compostela street, near Arco de Belén, Havana. Shortly after, Iglesias is seen to be seduced by a brunette (Ana Karla Suarez) showing her best dance moves. The video ends with Enrique and Co. running back after they hear police sirens approaching them.

=== Critical reception ===
Billboard described the video as spectacular and mentioned that "a young Cuban flamenco troupe swirling in red dresses meet up with street dancers with some mad soccer skills in one of the best choreographed encounters since the Sharks met the Jets." Huffington Post also mentioned that the video has a little football and a sensual dance.

== Live performances ==
Iglesias first performed the Spanish version of "Bailando" on Today in New York City. in a set that included "I'm a Freak", and "Heart Attack". He would go on to perform the song on that year's Nuestra Belleza Latina, Billboard Latin Music Awards and included in a medley with El Perdedor at the Premios Juventud.

Iglesias' first televised performance of the English version at Macy's Fourth of July Fireworks Spectacular and went on to perform the song at America's Got Talent, Good Morning America in set that included Hero and I'm a Freak. He would also perform the song on So You Think You Can Dance and Fashion Rocks and performed the song as a medley with I'm a Freak at the MTV Europe Music Awards and finally at Pitbull's New Year's Revolution.

== Track listing ==
CD single – Netherlands

1. "Bailando" (featuring Sean Paul, Descemer Bueno and Gente de Zona) [English Version] – 4:02

CD single – English version without rap

1. "Bailando" (featuring Descemer Bueno and Gente de Zona) [English Version without rap] – 4:02

Digital download

1. "Bailando" (featuring Sean Paul, Descemer Bueno and Gente de Zona) [English Version] – 4:02
2. "Bailando" (featuring Descemer Bueno and Gente de Zona) – 4:03

Digital download – Brazil version

1. "Bailando" (featuring Luan Santana, Descemer Bueno and Gente de Zona) [Portuguese (Brazil) Version] – 4:03

Digital download – Portugal version

1. "Bailando" (featuring Mickael Carreira, Descemer Bueno and Gente de Zona) [Portuguese (Portugal) Version] – 4:03

Digital download – Remixes

1. "Bailando" (featuring Sean Paul, Descemer Bueno and Gente de Zona) [Dubble Dutch Remix] – 4:20
2. "Bailando" (featuring Sean Paul, Descemer Bueno and Gente de Zona) [Gregor Salto Remix] – 3:52
3. "Bailando" (featuring Sean Paul, Descemer Bueno and Gente de Zona) [DJ Blass Remix] – 3:57
4. "Bailando" (featuring Sean Paul, Descemer Bueno and Gente de Zona) [Kizzo Remix] – 3:31
5. "Bailando" (featuring Sean Paul, Descemer Bueno and Gente de Zona) [Kassiano Remix] – 4:05
6. "Bailando" (featuring Sean Paul, Descemer Bueno and Gente de Zona) [Matoma Remix] – 5:22
7. "Bailando" (featuring Sean Paul, Descemer Bueno and Gente de Zona) [Cineplexx Remix] – 5:08
8. "Bailando" (featuring Sean Paul, Descemer Bueno and Gente de Zona) [Mr.Beat Remix] – 6:00

Digital download – Remixes

1. "Bailando" (featuring Sean Paul, Descemer Bueno and Gente de Zona) [Dubble Dutch Remix] – 4:20
2. "Bailando" (featuring Sean Paul, Descemer Bueno and Gente de Zona) [Gregor Salto Remix] – 3:52
3. "Bailando" (featuring Sean Paul, Descemer Bueno and Gente de Zona) [DJ Blass Remix] – 3:57
4. "Bailando" (featuring Sean Paul, Descemer Bueno and Gente de Zona) [Kizzo Remix] – 3:31
5. "Bailando" (featuring Sean Paul, Descemer Bueno and Gente de Zona) [Kassiano Remix] – 4:05
6. "Bailando" (featuring Sean Paul, Descemer Bueno and Gente de Zona) [Matoma Remix] – 5:22
7. "Bailando" (featuring Sean Paul, Descemer Bueno and Gente de Zona) [Cineplexx Remix] – 5:08
8. "Bailando" (featuring Descemer Bueno and Gente de Zona) [The Infantry Remix] – 3:33
9. "Bailando" (featuring Descemer Bueno and Gente de Zona) [DJ Chino Tropical Pop Remix] – 3:12
10. "Bailando" (featuring Descemer Bueno and Gente de Zona) [Vein Dance Remix] – 3:33
11. "Bailando" (featuring Luan Santana, Descemer Bueno and Gente de Zona) [Brazilian Version] – 4:03
12. "Bailando" (featuring Mickael Carreira, Descemer Bueno and Gente de Zona) [Portuguese Version] – 4:02

== Commercial performance ==
The song has since become the most commercially successful song from Sex and Love, charting in more than 50 countries worldwide and it is most successful in Spanish and Portuguese speaking region, topping the charts in Colombia, Dominican Republic, Mexico, Portugal, Spain, and the Latin based charts in the United States. The song debuted at number 81 on the US Billboard Hot 100. The Spanish version of the song has peaked at number 12, making it Iglesias' highest-charting Spanish song of his career on the chart, surpassing the peak of "Loco". It is also his first top 20 hit on the chart since 2011's "Dirty Dancer". The song became Enrique's 13th number-one on the Hot Dance Club Songs chart. In October 2014, "Bailando" crossed the 1 million mark for digital downloads. Billboard named "Bailando" its number 38 song of 2014. By November 2014, the song had sold 1.2 million digital downloads. "Bailando" was later certified quadruple platinum by the RIAA, which denotes 4 million units based on sales and streams.

The song first charted on the Hot Latin Songs chart at number 6. In its third week, it topped the chart, becoming his third consecutive single from Sex and Love to hit number one on the chart and his 25th number-one single on the Hot Latin Songs chart. By 28 February 2015, the song had spent 41 consecutive weeks on top of the chart, making the song the longest-run at number one, beating the record set by Shakira, when her song "La Tortura" spent 25 non-consecutive weeks at the top in 2005. This record was later broken in 2017 when "Despacito" by Luis Fonsi and Daddy Yankee featuring Justin Bieber spent 56 weeks on top of the Hot Latin Songs chart. The single also debuted on the Latin Pop Songs chart at number 34 and on Tropical Songs chart at number 39.

In the rest of Europe also, the single was a success. It became a top ten hit in Portugal, Romania, Ukraine, Belgium, Switzerland, Italy, Finland, Netherlands, Russia, Luxembourg, Poland, Serbia, Bulgaria and Slovakia, top 20 hit in France, Czech Republic, Greece and Turkey, top 40 hit in Austria, Germany and Hungary, and a top 50 hit in Sweden. In addition to the Spanish charts, "Bailando" topped the European charts in Portugal, Romania, Italy, Finland, Poland, Serbia and Slovakia.

In the UK and Ireland, however, "Bailando" performed poorly, resulting in its peak at number 75 on the UK Singles Chart and only staying on the chart for a week. In Ireland, the song debuted at 92, and managed a peak of 72, staying for 6 weeks on the Irish charts. Enrique Iglesias marked his return in the French charts by reaching number 12, his last single that entered French charts was "Dirty Dancer" in 2011. In Italy, the song reached number one, making it his highest-charting single there since 2010's Euphoria hit song "I Like It", and has enjoyed 13 weeks at number one.

In Latin America, the song reached number one in Mexico, Colombia, and hit the top 20 in Brazil.

On the Canadian Hot 100, the Spanish version of the song debuted at number 52, then peaking to number 13, making this song his first Spanish single to peak into the top 20. It was also his highest-charting single from Sex and Love on the Canadian Hot 100.

== Accolades ==
The song gave Iglesias three Latin Grammys including Song of the Year. This was his first win since 2003 when the singer won the Latin Grammy Award for Best Pop Vocal Album, Male for Quizás. Apart from song of the year, Bailando won Best Urban Performance and Best Urban Song award also at the Latin Grammys 2014.

Year	Ceremony	Award	Result
2014	Premios Juventud	My Favorite Lyrics	Won
2014	Premios Tu Mundo	Start-Party Song	Won
2014	Neox Fan Awards	Song of the Year	Nominated
2014	Latin Grammy Awards	Record of the Year	Nominated
2014	Latin Grammy Awards	Song of the Year	Won
2014	Latin Grammy Awards	Best Urban Performance	Won
2014	Latin Grammy Awards	Best Urban Song	Won
2014	Los Premios 40 Principales	Best Spanish Song	Nominated
2014	Los Premios 40 Principales	Best Spanish Video	Won
2014	Premios 40 Principales América	Best Spanish Language Song	Won
2014	Latin Music Italian Awards	Best Latin Song of the Year	Nominated
2014	Latin Music Italian Awards	Best Latin Male Video of the Year	Won
2014	Latin Music Italian Awards	Best Latin Collaboration of the Year	Nominated
2014	Latin Music Italian Awards	My Favourite Lyrics	Won
2015	ASCAP Awards	Latin Music – Song of the Year	Won
2015	Lo Nuestro Awards	Pop Song of the Year	Won
2015	Lo Nuestro Awards	Pop Collaboration of the Year	Won
2015	Lo Nuestro Awards	Video of the Year	Won
2015	Billboard Latin Music Awards	Song of the Year	Won
2015	Billboard Latin Music Awards	Song of the Year, Vocal Event	Won
2015	Billboard Latin Music Awards	Pop Song of the Year	Won
2015	Billboard Latin Music Awards	Airplay Song of the Year	Won
2015	Billboard Latin Music Awards	Digital Song of the Year	Won
2015	Billboard Latin Music Awards	Streaming Song of the Year	Won
2015	2015 Billboard Music Awards	Top Latin Song	Won
2015	Premios Juventud	My Favourite Catchiest Song	Won
2015	Premios Juventud	My Favourite Music Video	Won
2015	Premios Juventud	My Favourite Ringtone	Won
2015	Premios Juventud	The Perfect Combo	Won

== Charts ==
=== Weekly charts ===
Chart (2014–18)	Peak position
Australia (ARIA)	52
Austria (Ö3 Austria Top 40)	42
Belgium (Ultratop 50 Flanders)	6
Belgium (Ultratop 50 Wallonia)	8
Brazil (Billboard Brasil Hot 100)^{[b]}	65
Canada Hot 100 (Billboard)	13
Canada AC (Billboard)	40
Canada CHR/Top 40 (Billboard)	18
Canada Hot AC (Billboard)	33
Colombia (National-Report)	1
Czech Republic Airplay (ČNS IFPI)	20
Czech Republic Singles Digital (ČNS IFPI) Spanglish version	13
Dominican Republic (Monitor Latino)	1
Finland (Suomen virallinen lista)	10
France (SNEP)	12
Germany (GfK)	31
Hungary (Single Top 40)	15
India (Angrezi Top 20)	10
Ireland (IRMA)	72
Israel (Media Forest)	3
Italy (FIMI)	1
Luxembourg (Billboard)	10
Mexico (Billboard Mexican Airplay)	1
Mexico (Monitor Latino)	1
Netherlands (Dutch Top 40)	5
Netherlands (Single Top 100)	3
Poland Airplay (ZPAV) Spanglish version	4
Poland Dance (ZPAV)	1
Portugal (Billboard)	1
Romania Airplay (Media Forest)	1
Russia Airplay (TopHit)	7
Slovakia Airplay (ČNS IFPI)	1
Slovakia Singles Digital (ČNS IFPI) Spanglish version	8
Slovenia (SloTop50)	31
Spain (Promusicae)	1
Sweden (Sverigetopplistan)	47
Switzerland (Schweizer Hitparade)	4
Switzerland (Media Control Romandy)	2
Turkey (Turkish Singles Chart)	11
UK Singles (Official Charts Company)	75
Ukraine Airplay (TopHit)	2
US Billboard Hot 100	12
US Hot Latin Songs (Billboard)	1
US Latin Airplay (Billboard)	1
US Adult Contemporary (Billboard) English version	38
US Adult Pop Airplay (Billboard) English version	28
US Dance Club Songs (Billboard) English version	1
US Pop Airplay (Billboard) English version	10
US Rhythmic Airplay (Billboard) English version	30
Venezuela (Record Report)	17

=== Year-end charts ===
Chart (2014)	Position
Belgium (Ultratop Flanders)	61
Belgium (Ultratop Wallonia)	46
Canada (Canadian Hot 100)	54
Colombia (National-Report)	1
Dominican Republic (Monitor Latino)	2
France (SNEP)	79
Italy (FIMI)	1
Netherlands (Dutch Top 40)	40
Netherlands (Single Top 100)	18
Russia Airplay (TopHit)	23
Spain (PROMUSICAE)	1
Switzerland (Schweizer Hitparade)	12
Ukraine Airplay (TopHit)	30
US Billboard Hot 100	38
US Mainstream Top 40 (Billboard)	46
US Latin Airplay (Billboard)	1
US Latin Songs (Billboard)	1
Chart (2015)	Position
CIS (TopHit)	62
France (SNEP)	143
Italy (FIMI)	16
Russia Airplay (TopHit)	60
Spain (PROMUSICAE)	18
Ukraine Airplay (TopHit)	165
US Latin Airplay (Billboard)	11
US Latin Songs (Billboard)	10
US Latin Pop Songs (Billboard)	10

=== Decade-end charts ===
Chart (2010–2019)	Position
US Hot Latin Songs (Billboard)	4

=== All-time charts ===
Chart (2021)	Position
US Hot Latin Songs (Billboard)	9

== Certifications ==
Region	Certification	Certified units/sales
Belgium (BRMA)	Platinum	20,000^{‡}
Brazil (Pro-Música Brasil)	2× Diamond	500,000^{‡}
Canada (Music Canada)	2× Platinum	160,000^{*}
Denmark (IFPI Danmark)	Platinum	90,000^{‡}
Germany (BVMI)	Platinum	600,000^{‡}
Italy (FIMI)	9× Platinum	450,000^{‡}
Mexico (AMPROFON) Spanish version	5× Diamond+3× Platinum+Gold	1,710,000^{*}
Netherlands (NVPI)	2× Platinum	40,000^{^}
New Zealand (RMNZ)	Platinum	30,000^{‡}
Portugal (AFP)	Gold	10,000^{‡}
Spain (Promusicae) English Version	7× Platinum	280,000^{‡}
Spain (Promusicae) Spanish Version	8× Platinum	320,000^{*}
Sweden (GLF)	Platinum	40,000^{‡}
Switzerland (IFPI Switzerland)	Platinum	30,000^{^}
United Kingdom (BPI)	Platinum	600,000^{‡}
United States (RIAA)	4× Platinum	4,000,000^{‡}
Streaming
Spain (Promusicae)	4× Platinum	32,000,000^{†}
^{*} Sales figures based on certification alone.^{^} Shipments figures based on certification alone.^{‡} Sales+streaming figures based on certification alone.^{†} Streaming-only figures based on certification alone.

== Release history ==
Region	Date	Format	Ref.
France	28 April 2014	Digital download	
New Zealand	28 April 2014	Digital download	
Italy	28 April 2014	Digital download	
Germany	2 May 2014	Digital download	
United States	26 May 2014	Mainstream radio	
Italy	20 June 2014	Mainstream radio	

== Disputes ==
The Peruvian singer and composer Pelo D'Ambrosio reported that the song "Bailando" copied the intro and the chorus of his song, "Lejos de ti". However, he withdrew the complaint a few months later after experts determined that there was nothing copied in the lyrics nor in the chorus.

In Vietnam, the singer and composer Only C released the song "Đắng lòng thanh niên" in July 2014 and borrowed the beat from "Bailando" without permission from Enrique Iglesias. It featured with the Avatar Boys Band to become a phenomenon on social networks, despite the mixed opinions.

== See also ==
- List of number-one dance singles of 2014 (U.S.)
- List of Billboard Hot Latin Songs and Latin Airplay number ones of 2014
- List of Billboard Hot Latin Songs and Latin Airplay number ones of 2015
- List of most-viewed YouTube videos
- List of best-selling Latin singles

Notes

- ^{^[a]} signifies a Spanglish version
- ^{^[b]} signifies Brazilian Portuguese version featuring Luan Santana
