= Daladier (name) =

Daladier is a given name and surname. Notable people with the name include:

- Édouard Daladier (1884–1970), French politician
- Gustave Daladier (1888–1974), French military aviator
- Daladier Arismendi (1975–2014), Colombian percussionist and singer for the band Alerta Kamarada
