= I'm a Freak =

Single by Enrique Iglesias featuring Pitbull

from the album Sex and Love
- Released: 11 January 2014
- Recorded: 2012–13
- Genre: Dance-pop; electro house
- Length: 3:38
- Label: Republic
- Songwriters: Enrique Iglesias; Armando Perez; Niles Dhar; Marty James
- Producer: KSHMR

Enrique Iglesias singles chronology
"El Perdedor" (2013)	"I'm a Freak" (2014)	"Bailando" (2014)

Pitbull singles chronology
"Timber" (2013)	"I'm a Freak" (2014)	"I Love You... Te Quiero" (2014)

"I'm a Freak" is the third English (and overall fifth) single from Enrique Iglesias's album, Sex and Love. It was the first single from the album to be released worldwide. The single was released on 11 January 2014 and features American rapper Pitbull.

The single was commercially successful and a hit in Europe. It became a top ten hit in the United Kingdom, Ireland, Scotland, Finland, Belgium (Flanders), Poland, Serbia, top twenty hit in Czech Republic, Russia, Spain and top forty hit in Bulgaria, and Austria.

== Background ==
The single was scheduled to be released in December 2012 but was postponed for unknown reasons. The track got leaked on the internet and social media on 31 December 2013.

This is the third single on which Iglesias and Pitbull have collaborated after the likes of "I Like It" and "I Like How It Feels". They have also collaborated on Pitbull's songs "Come 'n' Go" and "Tchu Tchu Tcha" off of his albums, Planet Pit (2011) and Global Warming (2012) respectively.

The cover of the single was uploaded on Iglesias's official website on 8 January 2014.

== Composition ==
"I'm a Freak" is a dance-pop and electro house song. It was written by Iglesias, Pitbull, Rome Ramirez and Niles Hollowell-Dhar. The song was produced by The Cataracs who also produced Iglesias's recent tracks "Turn the Night Up" and "Heart Attack". Idolator described the single's music production as "Bouncy "electropop" and lyrics as "provocative". They stated that the song sounds more like something you'd hear during a particularly lively night out at a suburban P.F. Chang's than it does like anything that captures an authentic piece of the Miami zeitgeist, it'll probably be a crowd-pleaser.

== Critical reception ==
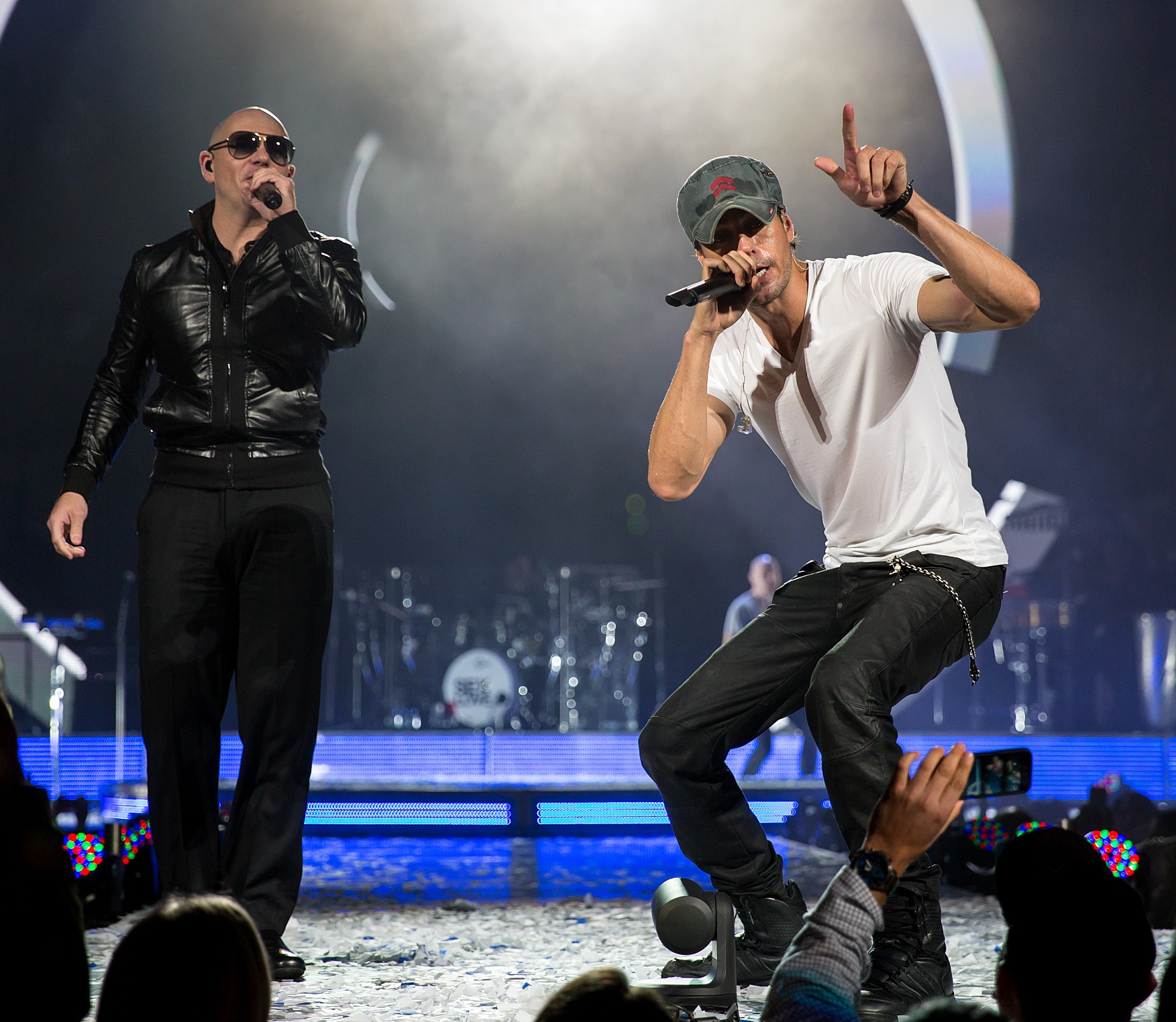
Enrique Iglesias performing with Pitbull in 2015

"I'm a Freak" generally received positive reviews. Jake Hamilton gave the song an A−, stating that the song is a chart conquer for spring. AMPed Music described the song as another club-ready anthem and a decent track. They also stated that the song "still oozes enough party mojo that would get any party animal crazy on the dance floor." ReDigi described it as "an unsurprisingly pure party anthem featuring a typically hedonistic production from The Cataracs ...Despite its wave of EDM bleeps, pulsing beats and suggestive lyrics, the song is a little more melodic and a little less bombastic than recent club bangers 'Turn The Night Up' and 'Finally Found You.'"

Haley Longman of OK! magazine gave a positive review and stated:

Nothing will ever compare to the catchiness of “I Like It” probably, but Enrique and Pitbull’s newest collab comes pretty darn close. When Enrique says “cause I’m a freAKK” in the chorus and his voice goes up like that…can’t handle. This song is so good. And it’s probably the 2014 version of “Timber,” so…

However Direct Lyrics gave a negative review with 1.5/5 stars, stating that the song doesn't look too bright and that the lyrics of the song are decent but the beat is weak.

== Chart performance ==
"I'm a Freak" was commercially successful and a hit in Europe. It became a top 10 hit in the United Kingdom, Ireland, Scotland, Finland, Belgium (Flanders), Poland, Serbia, top 20 hit in Czech Republic, Russia, Spain and top 40 hit in Bulgaria, and Austria. The single made a debut at No. 40 on Billboard Dance/Electronic Songs.

== Music video ==
The official music video premiered on 31 January 2014 on Iglesias' official Vevo account on YouTube. The music video is directed by Colin Tilley who has also directed Enrique's Heart Attack music video. The video has been viewed 80 million times (Aug 2017).

== Track listing ==
Digital download

1. "I'm a Freak" (featuring Pitbull) – 3:39

Other versions

- Dave Aude Party Vocal – 5:30
- Dave Aude Party Dub – 5:30
- Dave Aude Club Vocal – 5:26
- 7th Heaven Club Mix – 7:04
- 7th Heaven Radio Edit – 3:46

== Live performances ==
Iglesias was scheduled to perform the song at the Sports Illustrated Swimsuit event on 3 February 2014. He also performed the song at a private show on 14 January as well as in San Juan, Puerto Rico, and New York with Pitbull the day after.

He performed the song on The Voice UK on 29 March 2014. The song was also performed live on 21 June at Capital Summertime Ball 2014 at Wembley Stadium in London.

== Charts ==
=== Weekly charts ===
Chart (2014)	Peak position
Australia (ARIA)	45
Austria (Ö3 Austria Top 40)	39
Belgium (Ultratip Bubbling Under Flanders)	60
Belgium (Ultratip Bubbling Under Wallonia)	8
Belgium (Ultratop Wallonia Dance)	23
Canada Hot 100 (Billboard)	52
Czech Republic Airplay (ČNS IFPI)	18
European Hot 100 Singles	12
Finland (Suomen virallinen lista)	10
Germany (GfK)	56
Hungary (Stream Top 40)	5
Ireland (IRMA)	4
Mexico (Billboard Ingles Airplay)	9
Poland Dance (ZPAV)	9
Russia Airplay (TopHit)	20
Scottish Singles Sales (Official Charts)	2
Slovakia Airplay (ČNS IFPI)	66
Spain (Promusicae)	17
Spanish Airplay Chart (Promusicae)	2
UK Singles (Official Charts)	4
US Bubbling Under Hot 100 (Billboard)	5
US Pop Airplay (Billboard)	38
US Hot Dance/Electronic Songs (Billboard)	12
US Dance Club Songs (Billboard)	3
US Hot 100 Airplay (Radio Songs)	70

2026 weekly chart performance
Chart (2026)	Peak position
Lithuania Airplay (TopHit)	84

=== Year-end charts ===
Chart (2014)	Position
Russia Airplay (TopHit)	159
UK Singles (Official Charts Company)	94
US Hot Dance/Electronic Songs (Billboard)	42

== Certifications ==
Region	Certification	Certified units/sales
Mexico (AMPROFON)	Gold	30,000^{*}
United Kingdom (BPI)	Silver	200,000^{‡}
^{*} Sales figures based on certification alone.^{‡} Sales+streaming figures based on certification alone.
