= Noche y De Día =

Single by Enrique Iglesias featuring Yandel and Juan Magan

from the album Sex and Love
- Released: 1 April 2015
- Recorded: 2014
- Genre: Dance; Latin pop
- Length: 3:42
- Label: Universal
- Songwriters: Enrique Iglesias; Llandel Veguilla; Juan Magan
- Producer: Carlos Paucar

Enrique Iglesias singles chronology
"El Perdón" (2015)	"Noche y De Día" (2015)	"Messin' Around" (2016)

Yandel singles chronology
"Calentura" (2015)	"Noche y De Día" (2015)	"Como Yo Te Quiero" (2015)

Juan Magan singles chronology
"Si No Te Quisiera" (2014)	"Noche y De Día" (2015)	"He Llorado (Como Un Niño)" (2015)

Music video
- "Noche y De Día" on YouTube

"Noche y De Día" (English: "Night and Day") is a song written and performed by Spanish singer Enrique Iglesias, Puerto Rican singer Yandel, and fellow Spanish singer Juan Magan. The song was released on 1 April 2015 as the eighth and final single from Iglesias's bilingual album Sex and Love.

== Background ==
After the success of "Bailando", Iglesias released another Spanish song as the next single, the "fourth" Spanish single in the album, with the feature of frequent collaborator Yandel from the Puerto Rican duo Wisin & Yandel, and Spanish singer-rapper Juan Magan. The song is mid-tempo pop, with a slightly electric dance sound. It was recorded under the title "Noche y Día" in the album version.

== Music video ==
The music video for the single was created by the same team who previously directed the "Bailando" music video. Director by Alejandro Pérez and executive producers Yasha Malekzad and Kasra Pezeshki. The video begins with two young women from a helicopter, flying to Galicia, Spain, to the club owned by Yandel, with a crowd of young people dancing around. Enrique Iglesias stands in an empty lot, and the two women later join him. Yandel performs in the main stage. Juan Magan joins Yandel, with the approval of the crowd. The three singers are finally united towards the end of the song. The video ends with the helicopter flying away. The video has received over 130 million views on YouTube.

== Commercial performance ==
The song peaked at No. 5 in Spain and No. 27 on the US Latin Chart. It was certified double platinum in Spain and gold in Italy.

== Track listing ==
Digital download
No.	Title	Length
1.	"Noche y de Día" (featuring Yandel and Juan Magán)	3:42

iTunes download
No.	Title	Length
1.	"Noche y de Día" (DJ Chusso Remix) (featuring Yandel and Juan Magán)	4:50

== Charts ==
=== Weekly charts ===
Chart (2015)	Peak position
Bulgaria (IFPI)	8
Spain (Promusicae)	5
US Latin Airplay (Billboard)	26
US Hot Latin Songs (Billboard)	27
US Latin Pop Airplay (Billboard)	10
US Tropical Airplay (Billboard)	24

Chart (2018)	Peak position
Ecuador (National-Report)	57

=== Year-end charts ===
Chart (2014)	Position
Spain (PROMUSICAE)	48

Chart (2015)	Position
Spain (PROMUSICAE)	83
US Latin Songs (Billboard)	69
US Latin Pop Songs (Billboard)	30

=== Certifications ===
Region	Certification	Certified units/sales
Italy (FIMI)	Gold	15,000^{‡}
Spain (Promusicae)	2× Platinum	80,000^{‡}
Spain (Promusicae)	Platinum	8,000,000^{†}
^{‡} Sales+streaming figures based on certification alone.^{†} Streaming-only figures based on certification alone.
