= List of number-one singles of 2014 (Venezuela) =

This is a list of the Record Report Top 100 number-one singles of 2014. Chart rankings are based on radio play and are issued weekly.

== Number ones by week ==
Week	Issue date	Song	Artist(s)	Ref.
1	January 25	"Te Gusta"	Grupo Treo featuring Elijah King	
2	February 1	"Que Bonita Eres"	Olga Tañón featuring Oscar D'León	
3	February 8	"Todo Por Ti"	Los Chamacos	
4	February 15	"Baila"	Daniel Huen	
5	February 22	"Tu Rompecabezas"	Benavides	
6	March 1	"Sobrenatural"	Omar Enrique	
7	March 15	"Propuesta Indecente"	Romeo Santos	
8	March 22	"Te Pienso Sin Querer"	Franco de Vita featuring Gloria Trevi	
9	March 29	"Por Ti"	Jose Arcangel	
10	April 5	"Tu Juguete Preferido"	Rogers Sky	
11	April 12	"El Psicólogo"	Sebastián Yatra	
12	April 26	"Como Te Odio"	Lasso	
13	May 3	"Chica Ideal"	Chino & Nacho	
14	May 10	"La Luz"	Juanes	
15	May 17	"La Cremita"	Guaco and Gilberto Santa Rosa	
21	June 28	"Tu Me Quemas"	Chino & Nacho featuring Gente D' Zona and Los Cadillacs	
22	July 5	"El Mar de Sus Ojos"	Carlos Vives featuring ChocQuibTown	
23	July 12	"En Cuerpo y Alma"	Diosa Canales	
24	July 19	"Apnea"	Ricardo Arjona	
25	July 26	"Te Doy Mi Voz"	Roland Borjas	
26	August 2	"Piensa en Mi"	Jonathan Moly	
27	August 9	"Pasarla Bien"	Ilegales featuring El Potro Álvarez	
28	August 16	"A Celebrar"	Olga Tañon featuring Elvis Crespo	
29	August 23	"Todo Lo Que Siento"	Sebastian Yatra	
30	August 30	"Pegado a Tu Boca"	Grupo Treo	
31	September 6	"Se Encendió"	GDM	
32	September 13	"Tu Principe Azul"	Benavides	
33	September 13	"Secretos"	Reykon	
36	October 11	"Camara Lenta"	Servando & Florentino	
38	October 25	"Despedida"	Caibo	
40	November 8	"Cuando Nos Volvamos a Encontrar"	Carlos Vives featuring Marc Anthony	
41	November 8	"Déjame Acompañarte"	Omar Enrique featuring Elvis Crespo	
43	November 22	"Tumbaye"	Oscarcito	
43	November 29	"Tu Tienes un Noseque"	Kent & Tony	
44	December 6	"Habla Blah Blah"	Gloria Trevi	
45	December 13	"Pasarla bien"	Ilegales y el potro	
