= Daladier Arismendi =

Daladier Francisco Arismendi Castañeda (October 18, 1975 - August 3, 2014), better known as Dala, was the founder of the Colombian reggae group Alerta Kamarada.

== Biography ==
Dala was a percussionist and singer for the Colombian reggae band Alerta Kamarada. His early life was influenced by the art of his father Samuel Gonzalez. His talents emerged through his illustrations during his 10 years at De La Salle University.

Dala Arismendi was born in Bogotá in 1975, he grew up living with both parents and his grandmother. In 1982, his father died due to health problems. In 1998 he decided to form the reggae musical group Alerta Kamarada. During that year he chose to live in the La Candelaria area, along with his band. The area is heavily influenced by Rastafari culture, and its principles of peace and love.

In 2009, he separated from Alerta. In search of a better life, he decided to go to San Agustín, located in the southern state of Huila. Francisco started a new life in "San Agus" as he called it, choosing a life dedicated to the land and nature. In 2011, his first CD as a solo artist was released, "San Agusthink"; it had 8 songs, 3 of which were dedicated to his country and the others focused on love and a strong critique of the system of oppression.

== Death ==
On August 3, 2014, Dala was found dead in his cabin, located in Maloca. He died from two head wounds inflicted by a sharp weapon.

== Discography ==
- En lo profundo (EP). Natarajah, 2003
- Alerta. Natarajah, 2004
- Somos uno. Sum Records, 2006; Universal Music, 2007
- San Agusthink 2011 - 2012
