= Heart Attack (Enrique Iglesias song) =

Single by Enrique Iglesias

from the album Sex and Love
- Released: 1 October 2013
- Genre: Electropop; dance-pop; dubstep; synth-pop
- Length: 2:49
- Label: Republic
- Songwriters: Enrique Iglesias; Niles Hollow-Dhar; Marty James; Rome Ramirez
- Producer: The Cataracs

Enrique Iglesias singles chronology
"Loco" (2013)	"Heart Attack" (2013)	"El Perdedor" (2013)

"Heart Attack" is the second English (and third overall) single from Enrique Iglesias' tenth studio album, Sex and Love. The song was produced by The Cataracs, who also produced the album's first single "Turn the Night Up", and was written by Iglesias, Niles Dhar, Marty James and Rome Ramirez. The song had its radio premiere on 17 September 2013 and officially impacted contemporary hit radio in the U.S. on 1 October 2013. It was made available for purchase as a digital download in North America on 8 October 2013.

== Background ==
After reaching moderate success with the song "Finally Found You" and very minor success with "Turn the Night Up", Enrique announced "Heart Attack" as his new single. Enrique premiered the song on 24 September 2013. Speaking to Ryan Seacrest, Iglesias explained the writing process, saying, "I don’t know why we do that. I think both girls and guys, we do that to ourselves. But it's happened to all of us and it's a story we can all relate to … and you think you've learned your lesson and it can happen over and over and over again. The way I look at music and write songs, it's like when you go to the movies, and some songs are more real and some songs are more fantasy."

== Composition ==
"Heart Attack" was written by Enrique Iglesias, Niles Hollowell-Dhar, Marty James and Rome Ramirez, with production being handled by The Cataracs, being his second consecutive song written and produced by them. "Heart Attack" is a midtempo dubstep and electropop ballad, with lyrics like, "I thought I never want you back / But I don’t wanna live in a world without you." Lyrically, the song talks about losing someone and it hitting you like a heart attack. In the chorus, he sings, "Yeah-yeah-eh…feeling like a fool-oo-ooh…hit me like a heart attack."

== Critical reception ==
The song received favorable reviews from music critics. Kevipod of Direct Lyrics called it "a billion times better than 'Turn The Night Up'," writing that "there's piano, there's guitar, and there's also dubstep in this song, which I wonder if The Suspex produced, because it's giving me some Demi Lovato 'Heart Attack' teas. [...] The build to the chorus is amazing." Patrick Bowman of Idolator called it, "a track that marries his seductive Latin pop sensibilities with the bass blaring weirdness of dubstep." Kevin Camilo of Sound and Motion wrote that "the hook is quite captivating and catches one’s attention especially with the big dub step sounds around it."

Andrew Le of Renowned for Sound gave the track only 1 out of 5 stars, writing that the result is "a track that sounds like a poor cover version of the songs it rips off. Listeners can easily sing Taylor Swift’s 'I Knew You Were Trouble' (‘Oh! Oh! Trouble! Trouble! Trouble!’ during the choruses) and Miley Cyrus’ 'We Can't Stop' (as this and Heart Attack feature piano in the verses) over this piece of derivative garbage. Enrique sounds unrecognizable too. The autotune and over-driven vocals snuff out his usually sensual tone and slight accent, as well as any personality left in this track."

== Music video ==
The music video was directed by Colin Tilley and visual effects were created by GloriaFX. The official music video was released on 25 October 2013 on Enrique's official VEVO account. Camilla Belle is shown as Iglesias's love interest. The video has over 94 million views since its release.

The actual storyline of the music video is revealed that Belle has cheated on Iglesias, the pieces coming together at the end of the video. The bloody hand is the result of catching Belle and her man-on-the-side in bed together, which ended with Iglesias beating him up, almost to death in a fit of rage and Belle, choosing her injured lover over her boyfriend, telling Iglesias to leave, and as could be assumed the contemplated suicide is a result of the split. The video ends with Iglesias deciding whether or not to end his life by jumping from perilous heights while Belle watches him from behind, ending with what appears to be images of Iglesias taking one step backwards.

On 16 October 2013, Iglesias released the lyric video of the single. The video reached 300,000 views in a span of 20 hours. An official sneak peek of the video aired on ABC show Good Morning America.

On 22 October 2013, Iglesias organized an official competition via Universal Republic. Fans were able to send their self made videos of the new single; the top 25 videos selected by Iglesias were posted on his official Vevo account on YouTube.

== Live performances ==
Iglesias has performed the song on Good Morning America on 28 October 2013, the TeenNick HALO Awards on 17 November 2013 at the Hollywood Palladium, and the season 17 finale of Dancing with the Stars. Enrique performed the song on The X Factor USA on 12 December 2013.

== Chart performance ==
Chart (2013)	Peak position
Canada Hot 100 (Billboard)	83
Canada CHR/Top 40 (Billboard)	45
US Digital Song Sales (Billboard)	95
US Billboard Hot 100	88
US Pop Airplay (Billboard)	26

== Release history ==
Country	Date	Format	Label(s)
United States	1 October 2013	Contemporary hit radio	Republic
United States	8 October 2013	Digital download	Republic
Canada	8 October 2013	Digital download	Republic
Mexico	8 October 2013	Digital download	Republic
