= Turn the Night Up =

Single by Enrique Iglesias

from the album Sex and Love
- Released: 30 July 2013
- Genre: Dance-pop; electropop; EDM
- Length: 3:17
- Label: Republic
- Songwriter(s): Enrique Iglesias; Niles Hollowell-Dhar; Marty James; Rome Ramirez
- Producer(s): The Cataracs

Enrique Iglesias singles chronology
"Finally Found You" (2012)	"Turn the Night Up" (2013)	"Loco" (2013)

Music video
- "Enrique Iglesias - Turn The Night Up (Official)" on YouTube

"Turn the Night Up" is a song recorded by Spanish singer Enrique Iglesias, released as the lead single off Iglesias' tenth studio album Sex and Love. It was written by Iglesias, Niles Hollowell-Dhar, Marty James and Rome Ramirez, and produced by The Cataracs. On 18 July 2013 Enrique uploaded the single's cover art on his official website, while the song was released to US Top 40 radio on 22 July 2013.

"Turn the Night Up" is a dance-pop, electropop and EDM song, following in the footsteps of his previous singles, "Finally Found You", "Tonight (I'm Fuckin' You)" and others, and it was built from a phrase that he always uses with his girlfriend Anna Kournikova. The song received mixed reviews from critics, who noted that the song is not groundbreaking or innovative, while it achieved minor success on the charts.

== Background ==
After releasing "Finally Found You" in September 2012, as the lead single from his upcoming tenth studio album. The song was a moderate success, reaching the top-forty in most countries, however, the singer announced that the song "Turn the Night Up" would be the lead single of the album, during its premiere on Elvis Duran show on New York City's Z100, on 22 July 2013. During the interview with Duran, Iglesias said, "You know how people are going to react to I and you put so much love into it, so much work into it and it all comes down to that second. The ultimate test for me is once I write a song… I’ll go to sleep, wake-up in the morning and I’ll play it. If it feels good, if it puts me in a good mood, that’s when I know there is something special." The song became available for purchase on iTunes, on 13 August 2013.

== Composition and lyrics ==
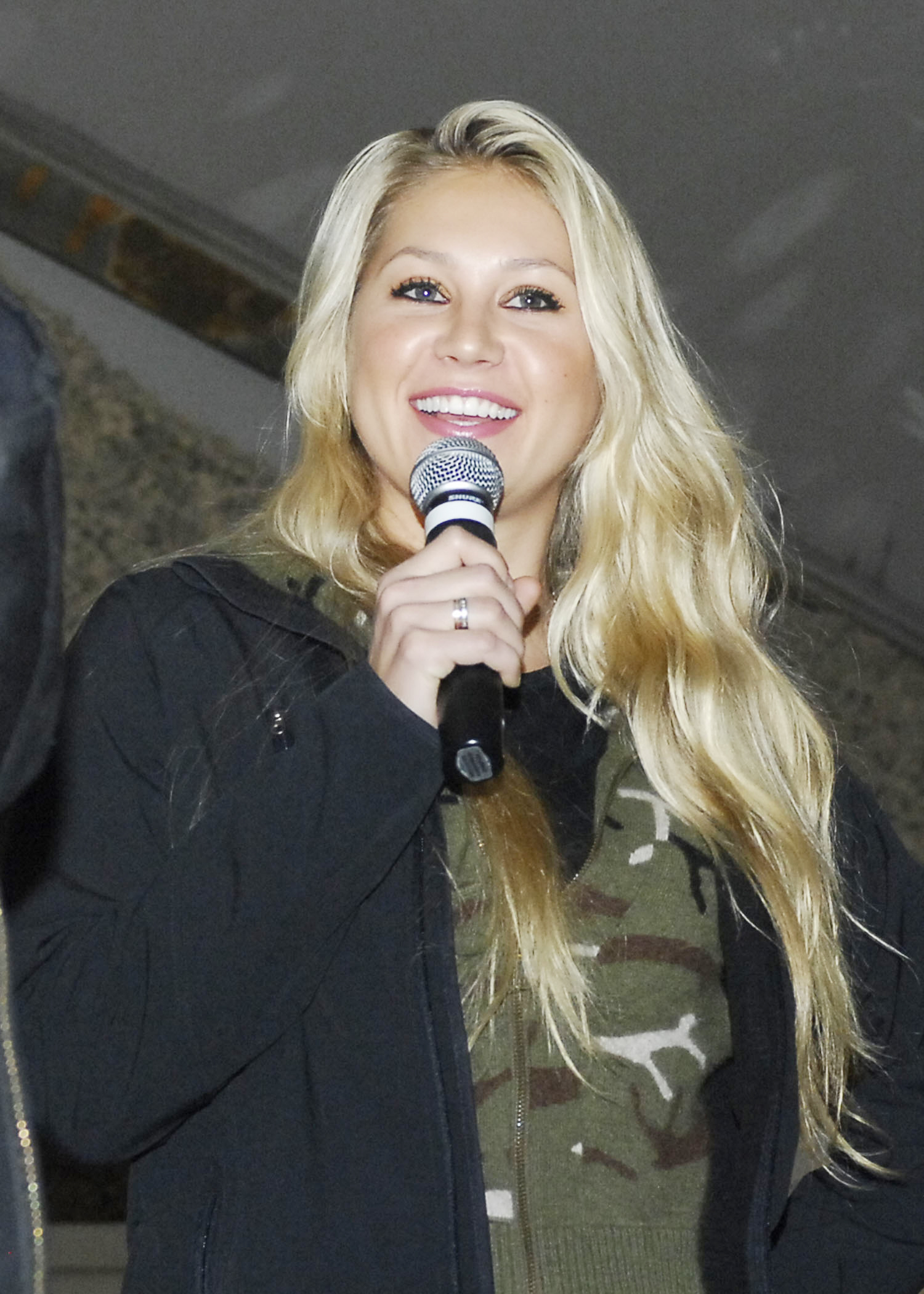
The song came from a phrase (gimme somme of that) that Enrique uses with his girlfriend Anna Kournikova.

"Turn the Night Up" was written by Enrique Iglesias, Niles Hollowell-Dhar, Marty James and Rome Ramirez, while production was handled by The Cataracs. Similar to his previous singles, "Turn the Night Up" is a dance-pop, electropop and EDM song, and according to himself, it's "one of those powerful, fun energetic songs and when we wrote it, I was just focusing at making sure if I could pull off the vocals in the studio, I was like, 'This is it, this could be one of those fun songs.'" In one of the verses, Iglesias describes his affection, singing "You know my intentions / I know you can go all night / I just wanna touch you / girl just let me touch you / I know it’s been on your mind".

Lyrically, the song came from a phrase he always says to his longtime girlfriend Anna Kournikova. Speaking to Ryan Seacrest, Enrique said, "You know how it started? I always walk around my house and I'm always joking around and there’s a phrase in the song that says ‘Gimme some of that.’ And I’m always saying that, saying ‘Gimme some of that’ and … doing a stupid little dance. [And] my girlfriend always starts laughing, so I went to the studio and said we’ve got to write the song around this!. Iglesias' line "One love, one love", originally included in his 2010 hit song "I Like It", was reused on the song. It was later reused again on his 2014 single "I'm a Freak".

== Critical reception ==
The song received generally negative reviews from music critics. Natasha Shankar of She Knows wrote that she "wasn't too thrilled with the track," calling it "another club-ready anthem" that cannot compare to his previous single, "Finally Found You". Direct Lyrics wrote the song is "not his best. Still, The Cataracs-produced beat is hot and I can see some DJs creating cool remixes so they can make 'Turn The Night Up' a must-play song in clubs this summer of 2013." He also praised "the dance beat", calling it "dope", and "the pre-chorus", calling it "kind of good", but that 'sexy talk' Enrique 'tries' to do, and the actual chorus are just weak." Zi Wei of Spin or Bin Music wrote the song "incorporates all the elements that made his previous songs Tonight (I'm F**in' You) and 'I Like It'; a sexually charged vibe, with a dancefloor-ready europop beat. But the song falls flat, sounding like a track off will.i.am's "#willpower", and that is not a compliment." He also wrote that "Enrique’s Pitbull-wannabe rap style is laughably bad".

== Commercial performance ==
While not reaching success on the Billboard Hot 100 chart, "Turn the Night Up" received positive reception from radio, where it immediately garnered an audience of over 12 million within only 24 hours. Meanwhile, over the course of four days, it climbed into the Top 20 audience rank of the Mediabase Top 40. The song debuted at number 30 on the Pop Songs chart, becoming his second-highest debut on the "Pop Songs" chart, only behind of his first entry, 1999's "Bailamos." The song sold 47,000 units in its first week, debuting at number 6 on Dance/Electronic Digital Songs, while also debuting at number 62 on the Hot 100. Additionally, the song has topped the Hot Dance Club Songs chart making it Enrique's 12th number one there.

== Music video ==
A fan version of the music video was uploaded on 22 July 2013, showing various images of his fans snaps and videos of partying. The fans were able to create their own version of the music video through the website "Turn the Night Up" to have a chance of winning two tickets to any Enrique Iglesias concert and a chance to meet him. The official music video was originally shot by Yasha Malekzad, through his production company Artist Preserve

=== Synopsis ===
In the music video, Enrique hops in his Aston Martin and follows a girl (Kristen Carpenter) to a house party filled with gorgeous women. Then he appears in a daze as he walks through the home filled with ducks and acknowledges every piece of eye candy in the room. Enrique and the mystery girl wrap up their night as they ditch the party scene and race off to a club where they take one too many shots and it is implied that they make out. This is also Iglesias and Carpenter's second music video collaboration following "Tonight (I'm Lovin' You)".

== Track listing ==
1. "Turn the Night Up"
2. "Turn the Night Up" (DJ AKS Remix featuring Mustafa Zahid)
3. "Turn the Night Up" (Laidback Luke Radio Edit)
4. "Turn the Night Up" (Rosario Club Mix)
5. "Turn the Night Up" (Rosario Radio Edit)
6. "Turn the Night Up" (Rosario Nasty Dub)

== Charts ==
=== Weekly charts ===
Weekly chart performance for "Turn the Night Up"
Chart (2013)	Peak position
Australia (ARIA)	54
Canada (Canadian Hot 100)	37
Canada CHR/Top 40 (Billboard)	37
Canada Hot AC (Billboard)	48
Czech Republic (Rádio – Top 100)	31
Lebanon (Lebanese Top 20)	15
Mexico (Billboard Mexican Airplay)	35
Spain (PROMUSICAE)	41
US Billboard Hot 100	61
US Pop Airplay (Billboard)	22
US Dance Club Songs (Billboard)	1
US Digital Song Sales (Billboard)	31
US Hot Dance/Electronic Songs (Billboard)	8
US Rhythmic (Billboard)	38
Venezuela Pop Rock General (Record Report)	4

=== Year-end charts ===
Year-end chart performance for "Turn the Night Up"
Chart (2013)	Position
US Hot Dance/Electronic Songs (Billboard)	29

== See also ==
- List of number-one dance singles of 2013 (U.S.)
