= Sex and Love =

Studio album by Enrique Iglesias
- Released: 14 March 2014
- Recorded: 2011–14
- Genres: Latin pop; electropop; dance-pop
- Length: 38:06
- Languages: English; Spanish; Portuguese
- Label: Republic
- Producers: The Cataracs; Mark Taylor; Carlos Paucar; DJ Frank E; Descemer Bueno; RedOne; Marty James; Rome; Metrophonic; Romeo Santos; soFLY & Nius; Alex P

Enrique Iglesias chronology
Euphoria (2010)	Sex and Love (2014)	Greatest Hits (2019)

Singles from Sex and Love
- 1. "Finally Found You" Released: 20 September 2012; 2. "Turn the Night Up" Released: 30 July 2013; 3. "Loco" Released: 24 August 2013; 4. "Heart Attack" Released: 1 October 2013; 5. "El Perdedor" Released: 28 October 2013; 6. "I'm a Freak" Released: 11 January 2014; 7. "Bailando" Released: 11 April 2014; 8. "Noche y De Día" Released: 1 April 2015

Sex and Love is the tenth studio album recorded by Spanish singer Enrique Iglesias. It was released on 14 March 2014 by Republic Records. The album's three Spanish singles—"Loco", "El Perdedor", and "Bailando"—reached No. 1 on the Billboard Hot Latin Songs chart. The album features guest vocals from Jennifer Lopez, Kylie Minogue, Descemer Bueno, Pitbull, Flo Rida, Anthony Touma, Romeo Santos, Mickael Carreira, Marco Antonio Solís, Yandel, Gente de Zona, Luan Santana, India Martínez, and Sean Paul. Sex and Love won the Lo Nuestro Award for Pop Album of the Year.

== Background ==
Iglesias explained the reasoning behind the title Sex and Love, saying: "It's one of the first things I thought about when I listened to the whole body of work. I think it's something we can all relate to no matter what religion, no matter what personality, no matter what colour, we can all relate to it."

Iglesias has described his album as fun and sexual, while some of it is more introspective and nostalgic. He then went on to say: "The words go together, but they can be separate and inspire different feelings and thoughts. It's all-encompassing. When you turn on the radio, what are the themes that everybody relates to? We all relate to sex and love. That's why when you hear music – 90% of the time – it derives from those two feelings."

== Release and promotion ==
The album became available for pre-order on 15 February 2014 through Topspin Media. Two versions of the album (a standard 11-track version and a deluxe version with 5 bonus tracks) were released, both physically and digitally. A special deluxe edition for Target and Walmart was also released, which contains two bonus tracks. The album became available for pre-order via iTunes in the United States, Canada, and Mexico on 4 March 2014, and for rest of the world on 5 March 2014. A 30-second sample was released on iTunes for each track.

== Critical reception ==
Professional ratings
Aggregate scores
Source	Rating
Metacritic	54/100
Review scores
Source	Rating
AllMusic	3/5 stars
ArtistDirect	5/5 stars
The Boston Globe	(favorable)
Culture Fix	4/5 stars
Daily Star	3/5 stars
Idolator	3/5 stars
Jake's Take	(B)
Newsday	(B)
PopMatters	2.5/5 stars

The album received mixed to positive reviews from music critics. The Daily Star gave the album 3 out of 5 stars, stating that "Iglesias has turned all sleazy Robin Thicke slurring: 'I've been spending all my money on these pretty girls and alcohol, but honey, they got nothing on you' over the funky 'Let Me Be Your Lover'." However, they praised "Loco", stating that it will have fans "getting their Latin freak on". AllMusic also gave the album 3/5, stating "Iglesias walks the line between the dancefloor jams of 2007's Insomniac and the romantic flavor of 2010's Euphoria." They chose "Bailando", "El Perdedor", "Let Me Be Your Lover", and "Loco" as the best songs from the album. Newsday gave the album a "B" grade and described the album as "slick, state-of-the-art Spanglish dance pop". Idolator gave the album 3/5 stars and called the album Euphoria's "older cousin", stating that the album "isn’t great but there’s enough decent material to remind you of what Enrique is capable of at full flight". They named "You and I" and "Bailando" as the best singles from the album.

Jake Hamilton of Jake's Take gave the album a "B" grade, stating that "he went overboard on the Spanish tracks". He also praised Iglesias' work in co-writing every song on the album. The Boston Globe gave a favorable review stating that Iglesias "remains a heartthrob for a reason". They also said that "You and I" is "filled with romantic yearning", while his duet with Kylie Minogue in "Beautiful" "manages to be corny yet endearing". They concluded that "It’s the heat not the beat that brings out the best in Iglesias".

Artistdirect gave a positive review and gave the album 5/5 stars, stating that the new album was "Enrique's biggest and boldest masterpiece yet" and that the song "Noche y De Día" "might just be one of the most powerful and potent Latin anthems ever". Culture Fix took note of the album's range of styles stating, "The club-friendly tracks are slickly produced and filled with a high-octane energy, the ballads are complete with a raw charisma and emotion, and the mid-tempo tracks hark back to some of the singer's best work", and scored the album 4/5.

== Commercial performance ==
Sex and Love debuted at No. 8 on the US Billboard 200, selling 24,000 copies in its first week. It is Iglesias's third Billboard Top 10 album after Euphoria (No. 10) and Escape (No. 2). The album also entered the Top 10 of the Canadian Albums Chart. It peaked at No. 1 on the Top Latin Albums and Latin Pop Albums charts simultaneously. It peaked at No. 11 on the UK Albums Chart, selling an approximate of 7,500 copies in first week. It also peaked at No. 6 on the Spanish Albums Chart. The album received a gold certification within the second week of its release in Mexico. Sex and Love was certified double platinum by the RIAA in the Latin field for shipping over 120,000 copies.

== Singles ==
- "Finally Found You" was released as a single on 20 September 2012. The track features vocals from rapper Sammy Adams. Commercially, the song managed to reach the top twenty in Canada and the top forty in Australia, Spain and United States, also topping the Hot Dance Club Songs chart. However, this song was only included on the international deluxe edition of Sex and Love.
- "Turn the Night Up" was released as the second single from the album and the song debuted at number 30 on the Pop Songs chart and at number 6 on Dance/Electronic Digital Songs, while also debuting at number 62 on the Hot 100.
- "Loco" was released as the third single from the album and features guest vocals from Bachata singer Romeo Santos. The single reached No. 1 in Spain, Mexico, and the Dominican Republic. Moreover, it also became Iglesias' 23rd No. 1 single on the Hot Latin Tracks chart and 18th No. 1 single on the Latin Pop Airplay chart. It was also ranked at No. 9 on the Billboard Year-End Hot Latin Songs chart for 2013.
- "Heart Attack" was released as the fourth single from the album, released exclusively in North America. It peaked at No. 88 on US Billboard Hot 100 and No. 83 on Canadian Hot 100. It also reached No. 26 on US Mainstream Top 40, making it Iglesias' 16th entry on that chart.
- "El Perdedor" was released as the fifth single from the album and features guest vocals from Marco Antonio Solis. It serves as the opening theme of Mexican telenovela Lo Que La Vida Me Robó (2013–2014). This is the fifth time that a song by Iglesias has been chosen as an opening theme of a telenovela after "Cosas del Amor", "Nunca Te Olvidaré", "Cuando Me Enamoro", "Marisol" (Por Amarte), and "El País de las Mujeres" (Ruleta Rusa). It became Iglesias' 24th No. 1 single on the Hot Latin Songs chart and 19th No. 1 single on the Latin Pop Airplay chart.
- "I'm a Freak" was released as the sixth single from the album and the first one to be released worldwide. The song features Cuban-American rapper Pitbull. The song became a commercial success in Europe, peaking within the top ten in the United Kingdom, Spain, Ireland, Finland, and Serbia. It peaked at No. 45 in Australia and No. 52 in Canada. It also peaked at No. 38 on US Mainstream Top 40 chart, making it Iglesias' 17th entry on that chart.
- "Bailando" was the seventh single to be released from the album. It became Iglesias' 25th No. 1 single on the Hot Latin Songs chart and 20th No. 1 single on the Latin Pop Airplay chart. It holds the number 38 spot on the Billboard Year-End Hot 100 singles of 2014 chart. The Spanish version of the song acts as the opening theme of the telenovela Reina de Corazones.
- "Noche y De Día" was released as an eighth and final single on 1 April 2015 and was certified platinum in Spain and gold in Italy. It was officially sent to radio stations in Italy on 3 July 2015.
- "Beautiful", a duet with Kylie Minogue, was released as the first promotional single on 14 March 2014.
- "There Goes My Baby" was released as the second promotional single only in the UK in May 2014. It peaked at No. 50 in the UK, but still received extensive airplay.
- "Let Me Be Your Lover", featuring Anthony Touma instead of Pitbull, was released as the third and final promotional single in France on 22 September 2014.

=== Other songs ===
"I Like How It Feels" was released as a digital download in Australia and some European countries on 23 September 2011, and later in the United States on 4 October 2011. The song was eventually included on the international deluxe edition of Sex and Love.

== Tour ==
Iglesias began his promo tour on 14 February 2014, which took place in San Juan, Puerto Rico. The next day he performed at a sold-out concert at the Madison Square Garden in New York.

The official tour began in Santiago, Chile, where Iglesias performed on 20 May 2014. Two days later, on 22 May 2014, he performed at Luna Park in Buenos Aires, Argentina. A second leg of the tour visited North America in Fall 2014, and was co-headlined by Pitbull. This was the second time that the two Latino stars toured together, with Euphoria Tour being their first. Demi Lovato was the opening act for some dates in the United Kingdom and Europe.

Enrique Iglesias grossed $194 million with Sex and Love Tour.

== Track listing ==
=== US versions ===
Sex and Love – North America standard version
No.	Title	Writer(s)	Producer(s)	Length
1.	"I'm a Freak" (featuring Pitbull)	Enrique Iglesias; Niles Hollowell-Dhar; Rome Ramirez; Armando Perez	Niles Hollowell-Dhar	3:39
2.	"There Goes My Baby" (featuring Flo Rida and DJ Frank E)	Iglesias; Marty James; Justin Franks; Rickard Goransson; Tramar Dillard	DJ Frank E; Rickard Göransson	3:18
3.	"Bailando" (featuring Descemer Bueno and Gente de Zona)	Iglesias; Bueno; Alexander Delgado; Randy Malcom Martinez	Carlos Paucar	4:03
4.	"El Perdedor" (featuring Marco Antonio Solís)	Iglesias; Bueno	Paucar	3:11
5.	"Loco" (featuring Romeo Santos)	Iglesias; Bueno	Paucar; Santos	3:33
6.	"Let Me Be Your Lover" (featuring Pitbull)	Iglesias; Niles Hollowell-Dhar; James; Ramirez; Perez	The Cataracs	3:58
7.	"You and I"	Iglesias; Ramirez; James; Hollow-Dhar	The Cataracs	3:05
8.	"Heart Attack"	Iglesias; Hollow-Dhar; James; Ramirez	The Cataracs	2:50
9.	"Me Cuesta Tanto Olvidarte"	Iglesias; Bueno	Paucar	3:34
10.	"Noche y De Día" (featuring Yandel and Juan Magan)	Enrique Iglesias; JY; Juan; Llandel Veguilla	Paucar	3:42
11.	"Loco" (featuring India Martínez)	Iglesias; Bueno	Paucar	3:13
Total length:				38:06

Sex and Love – North America deluxe version (bonus tracks)
No.	Title	Writer(s)	Producer(s)	Length
12.	"Turn the Night Up"	Iglesias; Hollow-Dhar; James; Ramirez	The Cataracs	3:17
13.	"Beautiful" (with Kylie Minogue)	Iglesias; Mark Taylor; Alex Smith; Samuel Preston	Taylor; Smith^{[a]}	3:25
14.	"Only a Woman"	Iglesias; Tom Douglas; Hillary Lindsey; James Slater; James; Hollow-Dhar; Petros; Ramirez	Mark Taylor; Paucar	4:03
15.	"El Perdedor" (Bachata Remix) (featuring Marco Antonio Solís)	Paucar	Paucar	3:26
16.	"Bailando" (The Infantry Remix) (featuring Descemer Bueno, Gente de Zona and Vein)	Iglesias; Bueno; Alexander Delgado; Randy Malcom	Paucar	3:33
Total length:				55:50

Sex and Love – US Target version (bonus tracks)
No.	Title	Writer(s)	Producer(s)	Length
17.	"Physical" (featuring Jennifer Lopez)	Iglesias; Tiyon "TC" Mack; Sandy Vee; Paucar	Vee	3:48
18.	"3 Letters" (featuring Pitbull)	Iglesias; Armando Perez; Chris Jackson; Joe	Vee	3:57
19.	"Loco" (featuring Descemer Bueno)	Iglesias; Bueno	Paucar; Santos	3:31
20.	"Me Cuesta Tanto Olvidarte" (Remix)	Iglesias; Bueno	Paucar	3:36

Sex and Love – US Walmart version (bonus tracks)
No.	Title	Writer(s)	Producer(s)	Length
17.	"Still Your King"	Iglesias; Ramirez; Hollow-Dhar; James	The Cataracs	3:37
18.	"Loco" (featuring Descemer Bueno)	Iglesias; Bueno	Descemer Bueno	3:14
19.	"Me Cuesta Tanto Olvidarte" (Remix)	Iglesias; Bueno		3:36
20.	"Bailando" (DJ Chino Tropical Remix) (featuring Descemer Bueno and Gente de Zona)	Iglesias; Bueno; Alexander Delgado; Randy Malcom	Descemer Bueno	3:33

=== Latin American versions ===
Sex and Love – Latin American version
No.	Title	Writer(s)	Producer(s)	Length
1.	"I'm a Freak" (featuring Pitbull)	Enrique Iglesias; Niles Hollowell-Dhar; Rome Ramirez; Armando Perez	Niles Hollowell-Dhar	3:39
2.	"There Goes My Baby" (featuring Flo Rida)	Iglesias; James; Justin Franks; Rickard Goransson; Tramar Dillard	DJ Frank E; Rickard Göransson	3:18
3.	"Bailando" (featuring Sean Paul, Descemer Bueno and Gente de Zona)	Iglesias; Bueno; Alexander Delgado; Randy Malcom Martinez	Carlos Paucar	4:03
4.	"El Perdedor" (featuring Marco Antonio Solís)	Iglesias; Bueno	Paucar	3:11
5.	"Loco" (featuring Romeo Santos)	Iglesias; Bueno	Paucar; Santos	3:33
6.	"Let Me Be Your Lover" (featuring Pitbull)	Iglesias; Niles-Dhar; James; Ramirez; Perez	The Cataracs	3:58
7.	"You and I"	Iglesias; Ramirez; James; Hollow-Dhar	The Cataracs	3:05
8.	"Heart Attack"	Iglesias; Hollow-Dhar; James; Ramirez	The Cataracs	2:50
9.	"Me Cuesta Tanto Olvidarte"	Iglesias; Bueno	Paucar	3:34
10.	"Noche y De Día" (featuring Yandel and Juan Magan)	Enrique Iglesias; Juan; Llandel Veguilla	Paucar & JY	3:42
11.	"Loco" (featuring India Martínez)	Iglesias; Bueno	Paucar	3:13
12.	"I Like How It Feels" (featuring Pitbull and The WAV.s)	Iglesias; RedOne; Perez; Alex P; Adam Baptiste; Björn Djupström; Bilal The Chef	RedOne; Alex P	3:40
13.	"Turn the Night Up"	Iglesias; Hollow-Dhar; James; Ramirez	The Cataracs	3:17
14.	"Beautiful" (with Kylie Minogue)	Iglesias; Mark Taylor; Alex Smith; Samuel Preston	Taylor; Smith^{[a]}	3:25
15.	"Only a Woman"	Iglesias; Tom Douglas; Hillary Lindsey; James Slater; James; Hollow-Dhar; Petros; Ramirez	Mark Taylor; Paucar	4:03
16.	"El Perdedor" (Bachata Remix) (featuring Marco Antonio Solís)	Paucar	Paucar	3:26
17.	"Bailando" (The Infantry Remix) (featuring Descemer Bueno, Gente de Zona and Vein)	Iglesias; Bueno; Alexander Delgado; Randy Malcom	Paucar	3:33
18.	"Physical" (featuring Jennifer Lopez)	Iglesias; Tiyon "TC" Mack; Sandy Vee; Paucar	Vee	3:48
19.	"3 Letters" (featuring Pitbull)	Iglesias; Armando Perez; Chris Jackson; Joe	Vee	3:57
20.	"Loco" (featuring Descemer Bueno)	Iglesias; Bueno	Paucar; Santos	3:31
21.	"Me Cuesta Tanto Olvidarte" (Remix)	Iglesias; Bueno	Paucar	3:36

Sex and Love – Latin American version (bonus DVD)
No.	Title	Length
1.	"I'm a Freak" (music video) (featuring Pitbull)
2.	"El Perdedor" (music video) (featuring Marco Antonio Solís)
3.	"El Perdedor" (Bachata) (music video) (featuring Marco Antonio Solís)
4.	"Loco" (music video) (featuring Romeo Santos)
5.	"Heart Attack" (music video)
6.	"Turn the Night Up" (music video)
7.	"Finally Found You" (music video) (featuring Sammy Adams)

=== International versions ===
Sex and Love – International standard version
No.	Title	Writer(s)	Producer(s)	Length
1.	"I'm a Freak" (featuring Pitbull)	Iglesias; Niles Dhar; Perez	The Cataracs	3:39
2.	"There Goes My Baby" (featuring Flo Rida)	Iglesias; Flo; Justin Franks	DJ Frank E	3:18
3.	"Bailando" (featuring Descemer Bueno and Gente de Zona)	Iglesias; Bueno; Alexander Delgado; Randy Malcom	Descemer Bueno	4:03
4.	"Beautiful" (with Kylie Minogue)	Iglesias; Taylor	Metrophonic	3:25
5.	"Heart Attack"	Iglesias; Niles Dhar	The Cataracs	2:50
6.	"Let Me Be Your Lover" (featuring Pitbull)	Iglesias; Perez* Niles Dhar; Marty	The Cataracs	3:58
7.	"You and I"	Iglesias; Niles Dhar; Marty; Rome	The Cataracs	3:05
8.	"Still Your King" (featuring Niles Dhar of The Cataracs)	Iglesias; Niles Dhar; Marty; Rome	The Cataracs	3:37
9.	"Only a Woman"	Taylor; Iglesias; Petros; Marty	Mark Taylor	4:03
10.	"Physical" (featuring Jennifer Lopez)	Lopez; Iglesias; Sandy	Sandy Vee	3:48
11.	"Turn the Night Up"	Iglesias; Niles Dhar; Marty; Rome	The Cataracs	3:17
Total length:				39:03

Sex and Love – International deluxe version (bonus tracks)
No.	Title	Writer(s)	Producer(s)	Length
12.	"Loco" (featuring India Martinez)	Iglesias; Bueno	Carlos Paucar	3:13
13.	"Finally Found You" (featuring Sammy Adams)	Yoan Chirescu; Fadil El Ghoul; Iglesias; Lenssen; Luttrell; soFLY & Nius; Wisner	soFLY & Nius	3:40
14.	"I Like How It Feels" (featuring Pitbull and The WAV.s)	Iglesias; RedOne; Perez; Alex P; Adam Baptiste; Björn Djupström; Bilal The Chef	RedOne; Alex P	3:40
15.	"El Perdedor" (featuring Marco Antonio Solis)	Iglesias	December Bueno	3:11
Total length:				52:47

Notes

- ^{^[a]} signifies a co-producer.

== Personnel ==
Credits for Sex and Love adapted from AllMusic

- Enrique Iglesias – lead vocals, composer, primary artist, quotation author
- Pedro Alfonso – viola, violin
- Randy Malcom Martinez Amey – composer
- Chapman Baehler – photography
- Markel Barsagaz – engineer
- Carlos Bedoya – engineer
- Delbert Bowers – composer, mixing assistant
- Claudia Brant – composer
- Richard Bravo – percussion
- Descemer Bueno – composer, featured artist
- Anthony Touma – featured artist
- Alex "Chichi" Caba – guitar
- David Cabrera – arranger, guitar
- Bruno Canale – guitar, engineer
- Ramon 'El Ingeniero' Casillas – composer, programming
- The Cataracs – producer
- Ivan Chevere – engineer, mixing
- Rob Clores – piano
- Austin Collins – synthesizer
- Tom Coyne – mastering
- Jesusin Cruz – guitar
- Carlos Dalmasí – recording director
- Steeve Daviault – creative director
- Pablo DeLa Loza – keyboards
- Alexander Delgado – composer
- Joaquin Diaz – keyboards
- Tramer Dillard – composer
- DJ Frank E – bass, drums, keyboards, percussion, producer, programming, synthesizer programming
- Benny Faccone – engineer
- Drew FitzGerald – art direction
- Flo Rida – featured artist
- Esther Fortune – vocals (background)
- Guillermo Frias – bongos
- Chris Galland – mixing assistant
- Gente De Zona – featured artist
- Serban Ghenea – mixing
- Rickard Goransson – composer, guitar, producer, vocals (background)
- John Hanes – engineer
- Marty James – composer, vocals (background)
- William Omar Landron – composer
- Marc Lee – engineer
- Konstantin Litvinenko – cello
- Manny López – guitar (acoustic)
- Juan Magán – featured artist
- Manny Marroquin – mixing
- India Martínez – featured artist
- Luan Santana – featured artist
- Aya Merrill – mastering
- Carlos Paucar – arranger, bass, engineer, guitar, mixing, producer, programming, vocal engineer, vocal producer, vocals (background)
- Pitbull – featured artist
- Rome Ramirez – bass, composer, guitar, vocals (background)
- Christian Ramos – composer
- Dante Rivera – bass
- Van Romaine – drums (snare)
- Mickael Carreira – featured artist
- Romeo Santos – featured artist, producer
- Alan Silfen – photography
- Marco Antonio Solís – featured artist
- Ramón Stagnaro – guitar (acoustic)
- Enrique Terrero – guira
- Roberto "Tito" Vazquez – engineer
- Brady Wiggins – programming
- Yandel – featured artist
- Jennifer Lopez – featured artist
- Sean Paul – featured artist

== Charts ==
=== Weekly charts ===
Weekly chart performance for Sex and Love
Chart (2014)	Peak position
Argentine Albums (CAPIF)	7
Australian Albums (ARIA)	23
Belgian Albums (Ultratop Flanders)	21
Belgian Albums (Ultratop Wallonia)	31
Canadian Albums (Billboard)	8
Croatian International Albums (HDU)	4
Czech Albums (ČNS IFPI)	10
Danish Albums (Hitlisten)	37
Dutch Albums (Album Top 100)	27
European Top 100 Albums	10
Finnish Albums (Suomen virallinen lista)	17
French Albums (SNEP)	33
German Albums (Offizielle Top 100)	32
Greek Albums (IFPI)	7
Irish Albums (IRMA)	67
Italian Albums (FIMI)	15
Mexican Albums (AMPROFON)	1
Norwegian Albums (VG-lista)	36
Polish Albums (ZPAV)	36
Portuguese Albums (AFP)	3
Scottish Albums (Official Charts)	10
South African Albums (RISA)	10
Spanish Albums (Promusicae)	1
Swiss Albums (Schweizer Hitparade)	23
UK Albums (Official Charts)	11
US Billboard 200	8
US Latin Pop Albums (Billboard)	1
US Top Latin Albums (Billboard)	1

=== Year-end charts ===
2014 year-end chart performance for Sex and Love
Chart (2014)	Position
Belgian Albums (Ultratop Flanders)	133
Belgian Albums (Ultratop Wallonia)	149
Italian Albums (FIMI)	54
Mexican Albums (AMPROFON)	5
Spanish Albums (PROMUSICAE)	13
US Billboard 200	127
US Latin Pop Albums (Billboard)	1
US Top Latin Albums (Billboard)	2

2015 year-end chart performance for Sex and Love
Chart (2015)	Position
Spanish Albums (PROMUSICAE)	67
US Top Latin Albums (Billboard)	7

== Certifications and sales ==
Certifications and sales for Sex and Love
Region	Certification	Certified units/sales
Argentina (CAPIF)	Platinum	40,000^{^}
Austria (IFPI Austria)	Gold	7,500^{*}
Brazil (Pro-Música Brasil)	Gold	20,000^{*}
Ecuador	3× Platinum	
India	3× Platinum	
Italy (FIMI)	Gold	25,000^{*}
Mexico (AMPROFON)	Diamond+3× Platinum	480,000^{^}
Peru	3× Platinum	
Poland (ZPAV)	Platinum	20,000^{‡}
Portugal (AFP)	Platinum	15,000^{^}
Singapore (RIAS)	Gold	5,000^{*}
Spain (Promusicae)	Platinum	40,000^{^}
United Kingdom (BPI)	Silver	60,000^{‡}
United States (RIAA)	2× Platinum (Latin)	336,000
Venezuela	Platinum	
^{*} Sales figures based on certification alone.^{^} Shipments figures based on certification alone.^{‡} Sales+streaming figures based on certification alone.

== See also ==
- List of number-one Billboard Latin Albums from the 2010s
- List of number-one Billboard Latin Pop Albums from the 2010s
