= Finally Found You =

Single by Enrique Iglesias featuring Sammy Adams

from the album Sex and Love
- Released: 20 September 2012
- Recorded: 2012
- Genre: Dance-pop; progressive house
- Length: 3:41
- Label: Universal Republic
- Songwriters: Yoan Chirescu; Fadil El Ghoul; Enrique Iglesias; Fabian Lenssen; Jacob Luttrell; soFLY & Nius; Sam Wisner
- Producers: soFLY & Nius; Fadil El Ghoul

Enrique Iglesias singles chronology
| "I Like (The Remix)" (2012) | "Finally Found You" (2012) | "Turn the Night Up" (2013) |

Sammy Adams singles chronology
| "All Night Longer" (2012) | "Finally Found You" (2012) | "L.A. Story" (2013) |

"Finally Found You" is a song by Spanish singer Enrique Iglesias, released on 20 September 2012. It was later included on the international deluxe edition of his tenth studio album Sex and Love. The track features vocals from rapper Sammy Adams. Both artists co-wrote the song with Jacob Luttrell, R3hab, Fabian Lenssen, Yoan Chirescu, Raphaël Judrin, and Pierre-Antoine Melki. The latter two, known together as soFLY & Nius, are also the producers. Another version featuring Puerto Rican rapper Daddy Yankee was released for Latin market.

"Finally Found You" is a dance-pop, electro house song about a guy finding the love of his life at a club and declaring to never let her go. The song received generally favorable reviews from music critics, who despite calling it too similar to his old hits, called it a euphoric track, matching his heartthrob persona with pulsing beats. Commercially, the song reached the top twenty in Canada and the top forty in Australia, Spain and United States, also topping the Dance Club Songs chart.

The video, released on VEVO, starts with an innocent game of hide and seek between a young Iglesias and his sweetheart, while life quickly fast-forwards to the artist strutting into a nightclub where he unexpectedly reunites with his childhood love for a very different and naughty game. Enrique performed the track on the iHeart Radio Festival and Jingle Ball.

== Background and release ==
After achieving success with his ninth studio album, Euphoria (2010), mainly with its singles "I Like It" and "Tonight (I'm Lovin' You)", Iglesias released the song "I Like How It Feels" (2011) as the intended lead single from a reissue of Euphoria. However, the release was cancelled after the moderate success of the song on the charts. In January 2012, Enrique was involved in a remix of the song, entitled "I Like (The Remix)", which features Pitbull and Afrojack. In August, Enrique premiered "Finally Found You", with the single being available to download from the US iTunes store on 25 September, while in the UK it was released on 10 December. According to Iglesias, the song makes him "feel like a kid again." An alternative version, featuring Puerto Rican reggaeton rapper and singer Daddy Yankee, was recorded for the Latin market.

== Composition ==
"Finally Found You" was written by Enrique Iglesias, Sammy Adams, soFLY & Nius, Jacob Luttrell, Fadil El Ghoul, Fabian Lenssen, and Yoan Chirescu, while production was handled by soFLY & Nius (known for their production work on Flo Rida's hit single 'Wild Ones'). "Finally Found You" features a rap from Cambridge rapper Sammy Adams and is a dance-pop and electro house song, with sparkling synths. According to PopCrush's Scott Shetler, sonically, the song features exactly the same dance-pop vibe of the singer's recent hits like ‘I Like It’ (2010) and ‘Dirty Dancer’ (2011).

Lyrically, "Finally Found You" sees Iglesias finding the love of his life at a club and declaring to never her let go, asking his "object of affection to ignore the advice of her friends and to stick with him till the end". In the chorus, Enrique sings, "In this crazy world the choice is ours, only got a few / either you’re coming with me or I’m coming with you / ’cause I finally found, I finally found you," with "heavily processed vocals", according to "Idolator"'s Robbie Daw. Later, Sammy Adams comes in and lets us know that he's "got his hands full" from grabbing girls, and informs us that he's "drunk as fuck."

== Critical reception ==
The song received mostly favorable reviews from music critics. Robbie Daw of Idolator was aware that the song "finds him sticking to the tried-and-true dance-pop formula that has kept him in the upper reaches of the charts since he first crossed over to pop stardom 13 years ago." Daw also saw that Sammy Adams verses are "another case of featured rappers veering away from the theme and spitting about whatever the hell they want to." However, Daw positively said, "who doesn’t love a guy who whispers sweet nothings and can give you a good beat to dance to at the same time?." Phil Kukawinski of AOL Music praised Adams verses, writing that, "The real shining moment in the song is brought out through his verse," praising "his flow and persona", which gives a good added edge and juxtaposition in the song that really puts it to a higher standard. Kukawinski also wrote that, "'Finally Found You' is a different feel for Iglesias, and with the numbers already on the rise with his new single, it seems that his slump is coming to an end."

Scott Shetler of PopCrush gave the song 3.5 out of 5 stars, writing that, "'Finally Found You' may be his most euphoric song yet, with its fluttering synths and lyrics about eternal commitment." Shetler also saw that Adams verses "don't necessarily fit the theme of the song, but chances are listeners will be so busy dancing they won’t notice the inconsistency." Melinda Newman of HitFix wrote that in the upbeat and bouncy song, "he’s finally found what he’s looking for, and it sounds remarkably like many other songs he’s done before and virtually every other song today that borrows David Guetta’s tremendously popular dance-pop whirl." Kim Alessi of Commonsensemedia wrote that "There's really nothing original about "Finally Found You," but the song does match Iglesias' sexy Latin dance-pop style and heartthrob persona, and is reminiscent of his other recent hit dance singles featuring rappers."

== Commercial performance ==
"Finally Found You" was received with great airplay in its first week, debuting at number 36 on the Billboards Pop Songs chart, on the week of 6 September 2012. The following week it jumped to number 29, becoming the "Greatest Gainer". In the third week, the song was again the 'Greatest Gainer' jumping 9 places into top 20 at number 20. It has since peaked at number 12, his best song on the "Pop Songs" chart since "Tonight". The same week it debuted on the US Billboard Hot 100 at number 94. In its third week, following its digital release, the song leaped to number 24, selling 112,000 copies, being the "Greatest Gainer" of the week. The song also became his 23rd chart topper on the Billboard Latin Airplay chart, more than any other artist. The song has also peaked at number 1 on the Billboard's Latin Airplay chart and has topped the Billboard's Hot Dance Club Songs chart making it Enrique's 11th number-one there.

Elsewhere, the song performed moderately. In Australia, the song debuted and peaked at number 33, on the week of 28 October 2012, it later fell to number 46, before leaving the charts at number 45. It remained only three weeks on the ARIA Charts and became his lowest-charting single since "Addicted" (2003). In Spain, the song only managed to peak at number 31, during its first week, while it re-entered for five non-consecutive weeks. In Canada, "Finally Found You" achieved more success, peaking at number 11 - the same position than previous single, "I Like How It Feels".

== Music video ==
The official music video premiered on 23 October 2012 through Enrique's official VEVO account. Larissa Kroeker is shown as Enrique's love interest in the video. The video shows a female dancer, a DJ, and much sound equipment, flashing lights, and lyrics written out on everything in sight. The video has received over 74 million views. Another music video of the song with Daddy Yankee was premiered on 21 November 2012 which was directed by Diego Hurtado de Mendoza. It has received over 87 million views.

=== Storyline ===
The story starts as a young Enrique (Santiago Gudino) plays hide and seek with his young female friend (Christie Nicole Chaplin). Years pass until they see each other from across the crowded room and get immediately reacquainted. They haven't seen each other in years, since they were 10 or so, and they go to the club and the bed, in steamy independent scenes of their full-blown adult independent fling.

== Track listing ==
Digital download

1. "Finally Found You" (Main) – 3:41

Digital EP

1. "Finally Found You" (Main) – 3:41
2. "Finally Found You" (Clean) – 3:41
3. "Finally Found You" (featuring Daddy Yankee) – 3:55
4. "Finally Found You" (Vice Remix Edit) – 4:22
5. "Finally Found You" (Vice Extended Remix) – 6:02

Digital Remixes EP

1. "Finally Found You" (ft. Sammy Adams) [Papercha$er's Remix] – 6:30
2. "Finally Found You" (ft. Sammy Adams) [R3hab & ZROQ Remix] – 4:39
3. "Finally Found You" (ft. Sammy Adams) [Bassjackers Remix] – 5:52
4. "Finally Found You" (ft. Sammy Adams) [DJ Vice Remix] – 4:32
5. "Finally Found You" (ft. Sammy Adams) [D-Wayne Remix] – 6:30
6. "Finally Found You" (ft. Sammy Adams) [Fractal Remix] – 6:08

Other Versions

- 7th Heaven Club Mix – 7:22
- Atay Nga Kobed (The Covid-19 Reggae Dance) (Kitaotao Tribes' YouTube Meme Song) - 2:22
- You Know I'll Go Get (Rizky Ayuba Song) - 2:40
- You Know I'll Go Get (DJ Rowel Remix/Bootleg) - 5:19

* Atay nga Kobid (Cover) (Vic desucatan song) - 3:44

== Charts ==
| Chart (2012) | Peak position |
|---|---|
| Australia (ARIA) | 33 |
| Belgium (Ultratip Bubbling Under Flanders) | 18 |
| Belgium (Ultratip Bubbling Under Wallonia) | 5 |
| Canada Hot 100 (Billboard) | 11 |
| Canada CHR/Top 40 (Billboard) | 6 |
| Canada Hot AC (Billboard) | 13 |
| Czech Republic Airplay (ČNS IFPI) | 36 |
| Poland Dance (ZPAV) | 43 |
| Slovakia Airplay (ČNS IFPI) | 10 |
| Spain (Promusicae) | 31 |
| US Billboard Hot 100 | 24 |
| US Latin Airplay (Billboard) | 1 |
| US Dance Club Songs (Billboard) | 1 |
| US Pop Airplay (Billboard) | 12 |
| US Rhythmic Airplay (Billboard) | 32 |
| Venezuela Top 100 (Record Report) | 54 |

=== Year-end charts ===
| Chart (2013) | Position |
|---|---|
| US Hot Dance Club Songs (Billboard) | 12 |

== Certifications ==
| Region | Certification | Certified units/sales |
|---|---|---|
| Brazil (Pro-Música Brasil) | Gold | 30,000^{‡} |
| United States (RIAA) | Gold | 500,000^{*} |
^{*} Sales figures based on certification alone.^{‡} Sales+streaming figures based on certification alone.

== Release history ==
| Country | Date | Format | Label |
|---|---|---|---|
| Australia | 21 September 2012 | Digital download | Universal Republic |
| Austria | 21 September 2012 | Digital download | Universal Republic |
| Belgium | 21 September 2012 | Digital download | Universal Republic |
| Brazil | 21 September 2012 | Digital download | Universal Republic |
| Denmark | 21 September 2012 | Digital download | Universal Republic |
| France | 21 September 2012 | Digital download | Universal Republic |
| Germany | 21 September 2012 | Digital download | Universal Republic |
| Italy | 21 September 2012 | Digital download | Universal Republic |
| Netherlands | 21 September 2012 | Digital download | Universal Republic |
| New Zealand | 21 September 2012 | Digital download | Universal Republic |
| Norway | 21 September 2012 | Digital download | Universal Republic |
| Spain | 21 September 2012 | Digital download | Universal Republic |
| Sweden | 21 September 2012 | Digital download | Universal Republic |
| Switzerland | 21 September 2012 | Digital download | Universal Republic |
| United States | 25 September 2012 | Digital download | Universal Republic |
| United Kingdom | 6 December 2012 | Digital download | Universal Republic |

== See also ==
- List of Billboard Hot Latin Songs and Latin Airplay number ones of 2012
- List of number-one dance singles of 2013 (U.S.)
