= El Perdedor (Enrique Iglesias song) =

Single by Enrique Iglesias featuring Marco Antonio Solís

from the album Sex and Love
- Released: 28 October 2013
- Genre: Latin pop
- Length: 3:11
- Label: Republic
- Songwriters: Enrique Iglesias; Descemer Bueno
- Producers: Carlos Paucar; Enrique Iglesias

Enrique Iglesias singles chronology
"Heart Attack" (2013)	"El Perdedor" (2013)	"I'm a Freak" (2014)

Marco Antonio Solís singles chronology
"Tres Semanas" (2013)	"El Perdedor" (2013)	"De Mil Amores" (2013)

"El Perdedor" (English: "The Loser") is the second Spanish (and fourth overall) single from Enrique Iglesias' album Sex and Love. It serves as the opening theme of Mexican telenovela Lo que la vida me robó. This is the fifth time that Enrique's song is chosen as an opening theme of a telenovela after Cosas del Amor, Nunca Te Olvidaré, Cuando Me Enamoro and Marisol (Por Amarte). The song was released in the United States and Mexico on 28 October 2013 and was later released to other Latin countries. The song was composed by Iglesias and Descemer Bueno.

== Background ==
According to reports, Enrique said that he wrote this song 8 years ago and for a lot of years he saved the track in a closet waiting for the right time to suggest it to one of his biggest idols, Marco Antonio Solís, and to ask him to put his vocals on it. Enrique got to know Marco as a person eighteen years ago when the Mexican legend lent him one of his songs "Invéntame", which Enrique sang for his first album. Enrique points out about Marco Antonio that he admires him a lot, not only as a person but also as an artist, and that teaming up with him on his song "El Perdedor" has been a very special and unforgettable experience in his career.

== Music video ==
A 30-second trailer of the official music video was also uploaded on YouTube on 28 December 2013. It received over 1 million views within a couple of weeks.

The music video for "El Perdedor" was released on 20 January 2014 on Iglesias' official VEVO channel on YouTube and has received over 1.0 billion views. The video is directed by Jessy Terrero, who also directed the music videos of Enrique's previous hits "Dímelo" and "Cuando Me Enamoro". The video features a guest appearance by televonela star Sandra Echeverría.

A Bachata version of the song was also uploaded on 24 January 2014 and has received over 70 million views. The song has a bachata rhythm and the video has minor changes.

=== Synopsis ===
The video features Iglesias and Marco Antonio Solís singing the song at an event that Sandra Echeverría's character is at with a date. Once she sees him on stage Echeverría drops the hand of the man she is with and focuses all her attention on Iglesias singing indicating she had a love relationship previously with him. Iglesias serenades Echeverría while singing. At the end of the video she gets up from her seat and runs crying out of the room.

== Live performances ==
Enrique and Marco performed the song in Mexico on 27 October, the day before the soap opera's first airing. They performed the song again at Premio Lo Nuestro on 20 February 2014.

== Chart performance ==
The song debuted at #28 on the Latin Songs chart. It leaped to #11 the very next week. The next week the single cracked the top five charting at # 5 while Iglesias previous single Loco still at #4.In its seventh week on the chart, the single became Iglesias 24th no.1 on this chart, more than any other artist in the charts history.

Following the airplay release, the song debuted on Latin Pop Songs at #23, being the greatest gainer of the week.

The following week, it debuted on tropical airplay chart at #18, being the highest debut of the week.

"El Perdedor" made its Billboard Hot 100 debut at #85.

== Charts ==
=== Weekly charts ===
Chart (2014)	Peak position
Dominican Republic Airplay (Monitor Latino)	2
Mexico Airplay (Monitor Latino)	12
US Hot Latin Songs (Billboard)	1
US Latin Pop Airplay (Billboard)	1
US Latin Airplay (Billboard)	1
US Tropical Airplay (Billboard) Bachata remix	1
US Billboard Hot 100	85

2026 weekly chart performance
Chart (2026)	Peak position
El Salvador Airplay (ASAP EGC)	5

=== Year-end charts ===
Chart (2014)	Position
US Latin Airplay (Billboard)	4
US Hot Latin Songs (Billboard)	2
US Latin Pop Songs (Billboard)	11

=== Decade-end charts ===
Chart (2010–2019)	Position
US Hot Latin Songs (Billboard)	41

== Certifications ==
Region	Certification	Certified units/sales
Brazil (Pro-Música Brasil)	Platinum	60,000^{‡}
Mexico (AMPROFON)	6× Diamond+Platinum	1,860,000^{*}
United States	—	100,000
^{*} Sales figures based on certification alone.^{‡} Sales+streaming figures based on certification alone.

== See also ==
- List of Billboard number-one Latin songs of 2014
