= Loco (Enrique Iglesias song) =

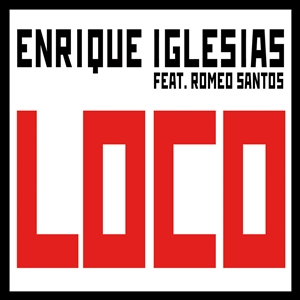

Single by Enrique Iglesias featuring Romeo Santos

from the album Sex and Love
- Released: 24 August 2013
- Genre: Bachata
- Length: 3:37
- Label: Republic
- Songwriters: Enrique Iglesias; Descemer Bueno; Lenny Medina
- Producers: Romeo Santos; Carlos Paucar

Enrique Iglesias singles chronology
"Turn the Night Up" (2013)	"Loco" (2013)	"Heart Attack" (2013)

Romeo Santos singles chronology
"Propuesta Indecente" (2013)	"Loco" (2013)	"Odio" (2014)

"Loco" (Crazy) is the lead Spanish single and overall second single from Enrique Iglesias's album, Sex and Love, featuring American singer Romeo Santos. This is Iglesias' second bachata song after "Cuando Me Enamoro". A banda version of the song was recorded which features Mexican singer Roberto Tapia. Another version of the song featuring Spanish singer India Martínez was released on iTunes on 17 December 2013. At the Latin Grammy Awards of 2014, the song received a nomination for Best Tropical Song.

== Music video ==
The music video is directed by Yasha Malekzad, who has also directed the music videos for "Turn the Night Up" and "Dirty Dancer". The video was released on Iglesias' official Vevo channel on YouTube on 26 August 2013. The video has been viewed over 600 million times.

=== Synopsis ===
The video starts with Iglesias walking into a bar, while the end of his 1995 song "Por Amarte" is clearly heard. He orders a drink. Beside Iglesias, Santos is sitting and looking tense. Actress Roselyn Sanchez who dances alone onstage under flashing lights, gyrating in a skintight red dress. Tough guy actor Danny Trejo, looks on menacingly. Enrique and Romeo are so down that neither can muster up the energy to approach Sanchez as she sashays past him, though both look on longingly as she walks out the door.

== Chart performance ==
Loco debuted on Billboard Hot 100 chart at number 87 and peaked at number 80, becoming Enrique's highest-charting Spanish song on the chart at the time. It surpassed "Cuando Me Enamoro" which peaked at number 89. The song also debuted in Spain at number 22.

The song debuted at number 8 on the Billboard Hot Latin Tracks chart with just three full days of sales and airplay as it was released on 24 August 2013. It sold around 3,000 downloads in those three days. It climbed to number 2 the very next week. It became 24th number one for Enrique in this chart. It has topped the Latin Airplay chart for 9 non-consecutive weeks.

The song also made a Hot Shot Debut on the Tropical Songs chart at number 4, being the Greatest Gainer of the week. The following week it rose to number 3 again, being the Greatest Gainer of the week.

It also debuted at number 3 on the Latin Pop Songs chart, becoming the Greatest Gainer of the week. The following week it rose to number 2. The song topped this chart in the third week making it Enrique's 18th song to top this chart further extending his record. It topped this chart for 12 consecutive weeks before getting replaced by Wisin's "Que Viva La Vida". The song regained the top spot the very next week. In total, the song spent 14 weeks atop of the Latin Pop Songs chart, becoming Enrique's best performing song on this chart surpassing his previous best "Dímelo" which topped the chart for 12 weeks.

== Charts ==
=== Version featuring Romeo Santos ===
==== Weekly charts ====
Chart (2013)	Peak position
Dominican Republic (Monitor Latino)	1
Mexico (Monitor Latino)	1
Spain (Promusicae)	1
US Billboard Hot 100	80
US Hot Latin Songs (Billboard)	1
US Latin Airplay (Billboard)	1
US Latin Pop Airplay (Billboard)	1
US Tropical Airplay (Billboard)	2
Venezuela (Record Report)	58

==== Year-end charts ====
(2013)	Position
Mexico (Monitor Latino)	55
US Latin Songs (Billboard)	9
US Latin Pop Songs (Billboard)	12
US Tropical Songs (Billboard)	12

Chart (2014)	Position
Spain (PROMUSICAE)	8

=== Version featuring India Martínez ===
==== Weekly charts ====
Chart (2013)	Peak position
Spain (Promusicae)	1

== Certifications ==
Region	Certification	Certified units/sales
Mexico (AMPROFON)	2× Diamond	600,000^{*}
Spain (Promusicae)	2× Platinum	120,000^{‡}
United States	—	61,000
Streaming
Spain (Promusicae)	Platinum	8,000,000^{†}
^{*} Sales figures based on certification alone.^{‡} Sales+streaming figures based on certification alone.^{†} Streaming-only figures based on certification alone.

== See also ==
- List of number-one songs of 2013 (Mexico)
- List of number-one Billboard Hot Latin Songs of 2013
- List of Billboard number-one Latin songs of 2014
