= List of awards and nominations received by Romeo Santos =

Romeo Santos awards and nominations
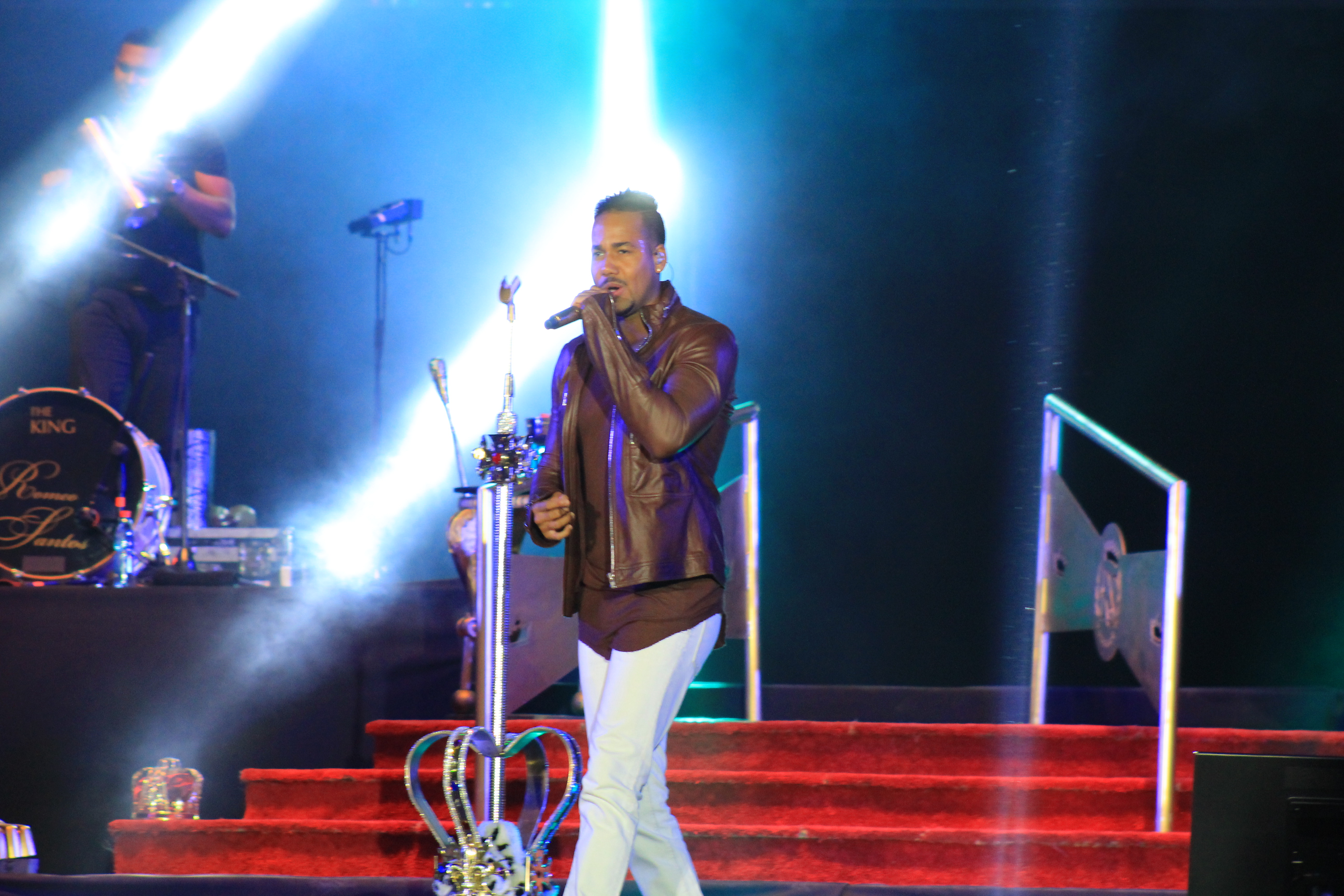
- Romeo Santos performing at the Julio Martínez Prádanos National Stadium in Chile
Awards and nominations
Award	Wins	Nominations
Grammy Awards	0	1
Billboard Music Awards	3	20
Billboard Latin Music Awards	46	124
Premios Juventud	14	41
Latin Grammy Awards	1	2
Lo Nuestro Awards	19	62
Latin American Music Awards	3	22
ASCAP Awards	37	37
BMI Awards	1	1
MTV Video Music Awards	1	1
Soberano Awards	6	17
Oye! Awards	0	1
Premios Tu Mundo	1	5

Totals (Note: Certain award groups do not simply award one winner. They acknowledge several different recipients, have runners-up, and have third place. Since this is a specific recognition and is different from losing an award, runner-up mentions are considered wins in this award tally. For simplification and to avoid errors, each award in this list has been presumed to have had a prior nomination.)
- Wins: 142
- Nominations: 351

This is a list of awards and nominations received by Romeo Santos, an American singer and songwriter. His is a winner of a Latin Grammy Awards, three Billboard Music Awards, thirty-one Billboard Latin Music Awards, nineteen Lo Nuestro Awards, one MTV Video Music Awards and received a nomination at the Grammy Awards.

Santos was the lead singer and composer for Aventura, an American band which infused Dominican bachata music with hip-hop and R&B, and as of 2011, sold over 1.7 million records in the United States. During his time with the band, Santos received twelve American Society of Composers, Authors and Publishers (ASCAP) awards including Songs of the Year for his compositions "Un Beso", "Mi Corazoncito", and "Dile al Amor". He also received an ASCAP award in 2006 for Frankie J's cover of "Obsesión" and was named Latin Songwriter of the Year in 2012 and 2013. Santos wrote and performed "No, No, No" for Mexican singer Thalía on her album El Sexto Sentido: Re+Loaded (2006) which earned the duo a Lo Nuestro award for Pop Song of the Year and three Premios Juventud nominations.

Following the band's temporary separation in 2011, Romeo Santos released his debut album Formula, Vol. 1. It was nominated for a Grammy Award for Best Traditional Tropical Latin Album, receiving nominations at the Billboard Music Awards, Billboard Latin Music Awards, Premios Juventud, Lo Nuestro Awards, and Soberano Awards. His debut single "You" was nominated for Tropical Song of the Year at the Billboard Latin Music Awards of 2012 and Premio Lo Nuestro 2012, winning the award at the 2012 ASCAP awards. The following album Formula, Vol. 2 won two Billboard Latin Music Awards and the Lo Nuestro Award for Tropical Album of the Year.

In 2018 Santos received his first Latin Grammy Awards nomination for Best Contemporary Tropical Album with his third studio album Golden, followed by Utopía, which won the Latin American Music Award for Favorite Tropical Album. In 2023 his fifth studio album Formula, Vol. 3 won the Latin Grammy Award for Best Merengue/Bachata Album.

== Awards and nominations ==
Award/organization (Note: Charts are not included, unless they are explicitly described as "awards" or specific trophies are given.)	Year	Nominee/work	Category	Result	Ref.
ALMA Awards	2012	Himself	Favorite Male Music Artist	Nominated	
American Music Awards	2013	Himself	Favorite Latin Artist	Nominated	
American Music Awards	2014	Himself	Favorite Latin Artist	Nominated	
American Music Awards	2015	Himself	Favorite Latin Artist	Nominated	
ASCAP Latin Awards	2006	"Obsesión"	Pop/Ballad	Won	
ASCAP Latin Awards	2007	"Un Beso"	Songs of the Year	Won	
ASCAP Latin Awards	2007	"Noche de Sexo"	Urban	Won	
ASCAP Latin Awards	2008	"Mi Corazoncito"	Latin Song of the Year	Won	
ASCAP Latin Awards	2008	"Los Infieles"	Tropical Song of the Year	Won	
ASCAP Latin Awards	2009	"El Perdedor"	Tropical Song of the Year	Won	
ASCAP Latin Awards	2009	"Mi Corazoncito"	Tropical Song of the Year	Won	
ASCAP Latin Awards	2010	"Por un Segundo"	Tropical Song of the Year	Won	
ASCAP Latin Awards	2010	"Su Veneno"	Tropical Song of the Year	Won	
ASCAP Latin Awards	2010	"All Up 2 You" (with Akon & Wisin & Yandel)	Urban Song of the Year	Won	
ASCAP Latin Awards	2011	"Dile al Amor"	Song of the Year	Won	
ASCAP Latin Awards	2011	"El Malo"	Tropical Song of the Year	Won	
ASCAP Latin Awards	2011	"Su Veneno"	Tropical Song of the Year	Won	
ASCAP Latin Awards	2012	Himself	Songwriter of the Year	Won	
ASCAP Latin Awards	2012	"Promise" (with Usher)	Tropical Song of the Year	Won	
ASCAP Latin Awards	2012	"You"	Tropical Song of the Year	Won	
ASCAP Latin Awards	2013	Himself	Songwriter of the Year	Won	
ASCAP Latin Awards	2013	"La Diabla"	Tropical Song of the Year	Won	
ASCAP Latin Awards	2013	"Mi Santa"	Tropical Song of the Year	Won	
ASCAP Latin Awards	2013	"Promise" (with Usher)	Tropical Song of the Year	Won	
ASCAP Latin Awards	2014	Himself	Songwriters of the Year	Won	
ASCAP Latin Awards	2014	"Llévame Contigo"	Tropical Song of the Year	Won	
ASCAP Latin Awards	2014	"Loco" (with Enrique Iglesias)	Tropical Song of the Year	Won	
ASCAP Latin Awards	2014	"Propuesta Indecente"	Tropical Song of the Year	Won	
ASCAP Latin Awards	2015	Himself	Songwriters of the Year	Won	
ASCAP Latin Awards	2015	"Eres Mía"	Tropical Songs of the Year	Won	
ASCAP Latin Awards	2015	"Odio" (with Drake)	Tropical Songs of the Year	Won	
ASCAP Latin Awards	2015	"Propuesta Indecente"	Tropical Songs of the Year	Won	
ASCAP Latin Awards	2017	“Amorcito Enfermito”	Tropical Songs of the Year	Won	
ASCAP Latin Awards	2017	“Inocente”	Tropical Songs of the Year	Won	
ASCAP Latin Awards	2017	“Necio”	Tropical Songs of the Year	Won	
ASCAP Latin Awards	2019	"Bella y Sensual" (with Daddy Yankee & Nicky Jam)	Award-Winning Songs	Won	
ASCAP Latin Awards	2019	"Ella Quiere Beber (Remix)" (with Anuel AA)	Award-Winning Songs	Won	
ASCAP Latin Awards	2019	"Sobredosis" (with Ozuna)	Award-Winning Songs	Won	
ASCAP Latin Awards	2020	Himself	Artist of the Year	Won	
ASCAP Latin Awards	2020	"Aullando" (with Wisin & Yandel)	Award-Winning Songs	Won	
ASCAP Latin Awards	2020	"Canalla" (with El Chaval de la Bachata)	Award-Winning Songs	Won	
ASCAP Latin Awards	2020	"Inmortal"	Award-Winning Songs	Won	
ASCAP Latin Awards	2021	"La Mejor Versión de Mi (Remix)" (with Natti Natasha)	Award-Winning Songs	Won	
ASCAP Latin Awards	2021	"Sigues Con Él (Remix)" (with Arcangel & Sech)	Award-Winning Songs	Won	
ASCAP Latin Awards	2022	"Fan de Tus Fotos" (with Nicky Jam)	Award-Winning Songs	Won	
ASCAP Latin Awards	2022	"Volví"	Award-Winning Songs	Won	
ASCAP Latin Awards	2023	"Sus Huellas"	Award-Winning Songs	Won	
ASCAP Latin Awards	2024	"El Pañuelo" (with Rosalía)	Award-Winning Songs	Won	
ASCAP Latin Awards	2024	"Solo Conmigo"	Award-Winning Songs	Won	
ASCAP Latin Awards	2024	"X Si Volvemos" (with Karol G)	Award-Winning Songs	Won	
ASCAP Latin Awards	2026	Himself	Artist of the Year	Won	
ASCAP Latin Awards	2026	"Ángel" (with Grupo Frontera)	Award-Winning Songs	Won	
ASCAP Latin Awards	2026	"Desde Hoy"	Award-Winning Songs	Won	
ASCAP Latin Awards	2026	"Khé?" (with Rauw Alejandro)	Award-Winning Songs	Won	
Billboard Music Awards	2012	Himself	Top Latin Artist	Nominated	
Billboard Music Awards	2012	Formula, Vol. 1	Top Latin Album	Won	
Billboard Music Awards	2012	"Promise" (with Usher)	Top Latin Song	Nominated	
Billboard Music Awards	2013	Himself	Top Latin Artist	Nominated	
Billboard Music Awards	2013	Formula, Vol. 1	Top Latin Album	Nominated	
Billboard Music Awards	2014	Himself	Top Latin Artist	Nominated	
Billboard Music Awards	2014	Formula, Vol. 2	Top Latin Album	Nominated	
Billboard Music Awards	2014	"Loco" (with Enrique Iglesias)	Top Latin Song	Nominated	
Billboard Music Awards	2014	"Propuesta Indecente"	Top Latin Song	Nominated	
Billboard Music Awards	2015	Himself	Top Latin Artist	Won	
Billboard Music Awards	2015	Formula, Vol. 2	Top Latin Album	Nominated	
Billboard Music Awards	2015	"Eres Mía	Top Latin Song	Nominated	
Billboard Music Awards	2015	"Propuesta Indecente"	Top Latin Song	Nominated	
Billboard Music Awards	2015	"Odio" (with Drake)	Top Latin Song	Nominated	
Billboard Music Awards	2016	Himself	Top Latin Artist	Won	
Billboard Music Awards	2016	Formula, Vol. 2	Top Latin Album	Nominated	
Billboard Music Awards	2016	"Propuesta Indecente"	Top Latin Song	Nominated	
Billboard Music Awards	2018	Himself	Top Latin Artist	Nominated	
Billboard Music Awards	2018	Golden	Top Latin Album	Nominated	
Billboard Music Awards	2019	Himself	Top Latin Artist	Nominated	
Billboard Music Awards	2020	Himself	Top Latin Artist	Nominated	
Billboard Music Awards	2020	Utopía	Top Latin Album	Nominated	
Billboard Latin Music Awards	2007	Himself	Songwriter of the Year	Won	
Billboard Latin Music Awards	2008	Himself	Songwriter of the Year	Nominated	
Billboard Latin Music Awards	2010	Himself	Songwriter of the Year	Nominated	
Billboard Latin Music Awards	2011	Himself	Songwriter of the Year	Nominated	
Billboard Latin Music Awards	2012	Himself	Artist of the Year	Nominated	
Billboard Latin Music Awards	2012	Himself	Tropical Artist of the Year, Solo	Nominated	
Billboard Latin Music Awards	2012	Himself	Album Artist of the Year, Male	Nominated	
Billboard Latin Music Awards	2012	Himself	Tropical Song Artist of the Year, Male	Nominated	
Billboard Latin Music Awards	2012	Formula, Vol. 1	Album of the Year	Nominated	
Billboard Latin Music Awards	2012	Formula, Vol. 1	Digital Album of the Year	Nominated	
Billboard Latin Music Awards	2012	Formula, Vol. 1	Tropical Album of the Year	Nominated	
Billboard Latin Music Awards	2012	"Promise" (with Usher)	Vocal Event Song of the Year	Nominated	
Billboard Latin Music Awards	2012	"Promise" (with Usher)	Tropical Song of the Year	Nominated	
Billboard Latin Music Awards	2012	"You"	Tropical Song of the Year	Nominated	
Billboard Latin Music Awards	2013	Himself	Artist of the Year	Nominated	
Billboard Latin Music Awards	2013	Himself	Album Artist of the Year, Male	Nominated	
Billboard Latin Music Awards	2013	Himself	Tropical Albums Artist of the Year, Solo	Nominated	
Billboard Latin Music Awards	2013	Himself	Tropical Songs Artist of the Year, Solo	Nominated	
Billboard Latin Music Awards	2013	Formula, Vol. 1	Album of the Year	Won	
Billboard Latin Music Awards	2013	Formula, Vol. 1	Digital Album of the Year	Won	
Billboard Latin Music Awards	2013	Formula, Vol. 1	Tropical Album of the Year	Won	
Billboard Latin Music Awards	2013	The King Stays King: Sold Out at Madison Square Garden	Tropical Album of the Year	Nominated	
Billboard Latin Music Awards	2013	"Promise" (with Usher)	Digital Song of the Year	Nominated	
Billboard Latin Music Awards	2013	"Promise" (with Usher)	Streaming Song of the Year	Nominated	
Billboard Latin Music Awards	2013	"Promise" (with Usher)	Tropical Song of the Year	Nominated	
Billboard Latin Music Awards	2013	"La Diabla"	Tropical Song of the Year	Nominated	
Billboard Latin Music Awards	2014	Himself	Artist of the Year	Nominated	
Billboard Latin Music Awards	2014	Himself	Hot Latin Songs Artist of the Year, Male	Nominated	
Billboard Latin Music Awards	2014	Himself	Latin Pop Songs Artist of the Year, Solo	Nominated	
Billboard Latin Music Awards	2014	Himself	Tropical Songs Artist of the Year, Solo	Nominated	
Billboard Latin Music Awards	2014	Himself	Tropical Albums Artist of the Year, Solo	Nominated	
Billboard Latin Music Awards	2014	Himself	Songwriter of the Year	Won	
Billboard Latin Music Awards	2014	Himself	Producer of the Year	Won	
Billboard Latin Music Awards	2014	"Propuesta Indecente"	Hot Latin Song of the Year	Nominated	
Billboard Latin Music Awards	2014	"Propuesta Indecente"	Digital Song of the Year	Nominated	
Billboard Latin Music Awards	2014	"Propuesta Indecente"	Streaming Song of the Year	Nominated	
Billboard Latin Music Awards	2014	"Propuesta Indecente"	Tropical Song of the Year	Nominated	
Billboard Latin Music Awards	2014	"Loco" (with Enrique Iglesias)	Hot Latin Song of the Year	Nominated	
Billboard Latin Music Awards	2014	"Loco" (with Enrique Iglesias)	Latin Pop Song of the Year	Nominated	
Billboard Latin Music Awards	2014	"Loco" (with Enrique Iglesias)	Hot Latin Song of the Year, Vocal Event	Won	
Billboard Latin Music Awards	2014	"Loco" (with Enrique Iglesias)	Airplay Song of the Year	Nominated	
Billboard Latin Music Awards	2014	"Loco" (with Enrique Iglesias)	Streaming Song of the Year	Nominated	
Billboard Latin Music Awards	2014	"Loco" (with Enrique Iglesias)	Tropical Song of the Year	Nominated	
Billboard Latin Music Awards	2015	Himself	Artist of the Year	Won	
Billboard Latin Music Awards	2015	Himself	Hot Latin Songs Artist of the Year, Male	Won	
Billboard Latin Music Awards	2015	Himself	Top Latin Albums Artist of the Year, Male	Won	
Billboard Latin Music Awards	2015	Himself	Tropical Songs Artist of the Year, Solo	Won	
Billboard Latin Music Awards	2015	Himself	Tropical Albums Artist of the Year, Solo	Won	
Billboard Latin Music Awards	2015	Himself	Songwriter of the Year	Won	
Billboard Latin Music Awards	2015	Himself	Producer of the Year	Won	
Billboard Latin Music Awards	2015	Formula, Vol. 2	Top Latin Album of the Year	Won	
Billboard Latin Music Awards	2015	Formula, Vol. 2	Tropical Album of the Year	Won	
Billboard Latin Music Awards	2015	"Odio" (with Drake)	Hot Latin Song of the Year	Nominated	
Billboard Latin Music Awards	2015	"Odio" (with Drake)	Hot Latin Song of the Year, Vocal Event	Nominated	
Billboard Latin Music Awards	2015	"Odio" (with Drake)	Tropical Song of the Year	Won	
Billboard Latin Music Awards	2015	"Odio" (with Drake)	Airplay Song of the Year	Nominated	
Billboard Latin Music Awards	2015	"Odio" (with Drake)	Streaming Song of the Year	Nominated	
Billboard Latin Music Awards	2015	"Odio" (with Drake)	Digital Song of the Year	Nominated	
Billboard Latin Music Awards	2015	"Eres Mía"	Hot Latin Song of the Year	Nominated	
Billboard Latin Music Awards	2015	"Eres Mía"	Airplay Song of the Year	Nominated	
Billboard Latin Music Awards	2015	"Eres Mía"	Streaming Song of the Year	Nominated	
Billboard Latin Music Awards	2015	"Eres Mía"	Tropical Song of the Year	Nominated	
Billboard Latin Music Awards	2015	"Yo También" (with Marc Anthony)	Tropical Song of the Year	Nominated	
Billboard Latin Music Awards	2016	Himself	Artist of the Year	Won	
Billboard Latin Music Awards	2016	Himself	Social Artist of the Year	Nominated	
Billboard Latin Music Awards	2016	Himself	Tour of the Year	Nominated	
Billboard Latin Music Awards	2016	Himself	Hot Latin Songs Artist of the Year, Male	Won	
Billboard Latin Music Awards	2016	Himself	Tropical Songs Artist of the Year, Solo	Won	
Billboard Latin Music Awards	2016	Himself	Tropical Albums Artist of the Year, Solo	Won	
Billboard Latin Music Awards	2016	Himself	Songwriter of the Year	Won	
Billboard Latin Music Awards	2016	Himself	Producer of the Year	Nominated	
Billboard Latin Music Awards	2016	"Propuesta Indencente"	Hot Latin Song of the Year	Nominated	
Billboard Latin Music Awards	2016	"Yo También" (with Marc Anthony)	Tropical Song of the Year	Nominated	
Billboard Latin Music Awards	2016	"Hilito"	Tropical Song of the Year	Nominated	
Billboard Latin Music Awards	2016	"Hilito"	Airplay Song of the Year	Nominated	
Billboard Latin Music Awards	2017	Himself	Tropical Songs Artist of the Year, Solo	Nominated	
Billboard Latin Music Awards	2018	Himself	Tropical Songs Artist of the Year, Solo	Won	
Billboard Latin Music Awards	2018	Himself	Top Latin Albums Artist of the Year, Male	Won	
Billboard Latin Music Awards	2018	"Héroe Favorito"	Tropical Song of the Year	Nominated	
Billboard Latin Music Awards	2018	“Imitadora”	Tropical Song of the Year	Nominated	
Billboard Latin Music Awards	2018	Golden	Tropical Album of the Year	Won	
Billboard Latin Music Awards	2019	Himself	Tour of the Year	Nominated	
Billboard Latin Music Awards	2019	Himself	Top Latin Albums Artist of the Year, Male	Nominated	
Billboard Latin Music Awards	2020	Himself	Artist of the Year	Nominated	
Billboard Latin Music Awards	2020	Himself	Top Latin Albums Artist of the Year, Male	Nominated	
Billboard Latin Music Awards	2020	Himself	Tropical Artist of the Year, Solo	Won	
Billboard Latin Music Awards	2020	"Ella Quiere Beber (Remix)" (with Anuel AA)	Streaming Song of the Year	Nominated	
Billboard Latin Music Awards	2020	"Aullando" (with Wisin & Yandel)	Tropical Song of the Year	Won	
Billboard Latin Music Awards	2020	Utopía	Tropical Album of the Year	Won	
Billboard Latin Music Awards	2020	Formula, Vol. 2	Top Latin Album of the Decade	Won	
Billboard Latin Music Awards	2021	Himself	Male Top Latin Albums Artist of the Year	Nominated	
Billboard Latin Music Awards	2021	Himself	Tropical Artist of the Year	Nominated	
Billboard Latin Music Awards	2022	Himself	Tropical Artist of the Year	Won	
Billboard Latin Music Awards	2022	"Sus Huellas"	Tropical Song of the Year	Nominated	
Billboard Latin Music Awards	2023	Himself	Male Top Latin Albums Artist of the Year	Nominated	
Billboard Latin Music Awards	2023	Himself	Tropical Artist of the Year, Solo	Won	
Billboard Latin Music Awards	2023	"El Pañuelo" (with Rosalía)	Tropical Song of the Year	Nominated	
Billboard Latin Music Awards	2024	Himself	Tropical Artist of the Year, Solo	Won	
Billboard Latin Music Awards	2025	Himself	Tropical Artist of the Year, Solo	Won	
Billboard Latin Music Awards	2025	"Khé?" (with Rauw Alejandro)	Hot Latin Song of the Year, Vocal Event	Nominated	
Billboard Latin Music Awards	2025	"Khé?" (with Rauw Alejandro)	Airplay Song of the Year	Nominated	
Billboard Latin Music Awards	2025	"Khé?" (with Rauw Alejandro)	Latin Rhythm Song of the Year	Nominated	
Billboard Latin Music Awards	2025	"Ángel" (with Grupo Frontera)	Tropical Song of the Year	Nominated	
Billboard Latin Music Awards	2026	Himself	Tropical Artist of the Year, Solo	Won	
Billboard Latin Music Awards	2026	Better Late Than Never	Top Tropical Album of the Year	Won	
Billboard Latin Music Awards	2026	"Lokita Por Mí" (with Prince Royce)	Tropical Song of the Year	Won	
Billboard Latin Music Awards	2026	"Lokita Por Mí" (with Prince Royce)	Latin Airplay Song of the Year	Won	
Billboard Latin Music Awards	2026	"Dardos" (with Prince Royce)	Tropical Song of the Year	Nominated	
Billboard Latin Music Awards	2026	"Dardos" (with Prince Royce)	Latin Airplay Song of the Year	Nominated	
BMI Awards	2013	"Promise" (with Usher)	Award-Winning Songs	Won	
Cannes Lions International Festival of Creativity	2023	"El Pañuelo" (with Rosalía)	Excellence in Music Video	Nominated	
Grammy Awards	2013	Formula, Vol. 1	Best Tropical Latin Album	Nominated	
Heat Latin Music Awards	2015	Himself	Best Tropical Artist	Nominated	
Heat Latin Music Awards	2019	Himself	Best Male Artist	Nominated	
Heat Latin Music Awards	2020	Himself	Best Tropical Artist	Nominated	
Heat Latin Music Awards	2020	"La Mejor Versión de Mi (Remix)" (with Natti Natasha)	Best Collaboration	Nominated	
Heat Latin Music Awards	2021	Himself	Best Tropical Artist	Nominated	
Heat Latin Music Awards	2022	Himself	Best Male Artist	Nominated	
Heat Latin Music Awards	2022	Himself	Best Tropical Artist	Nominated	
Heat Latin Music Awards	2023	Himself	Best Male Artist	Nominated	
Heat Latin Music Awards	2023	Himself	Best Tropical Artist	Won	
Heat Latin Music Awards	2023	"Suegra"	Best Video	Nominated	
Heat Latin Music Awards	2024	Himself	Best Male Artist	Nominated	
Heat Latin Music Awards	2025	Himself	Best Tropical Artist	Nominated	
Heat Latin Music Awards	2025	"Khé?" (with Rauw Alejandro)	Best Music Video	Nominated	
Heat Latin Music Awards	2026	Himself	Best Tropical Artist	Pending	
Heat Latin Music Awards	2026	"Dardos" (with Prince Royce)	Best Music Video	Pending	
iHeartRadio Music Awards	2016	"Hilito"	Latin Song of the Year	Nominated	
iHeartRadio Music Awards	2026	"Ángel" (with Grupo Frontera)	Latin Pop/Urban Song of the Year	Nominated	
Latin American Music Awards	2015	Himself	Artist of the Year	Nominated	
Latin American Music Awards	2015	Himself	Favorite Tropical Artist	Won	
Latin American Music Awards	2015	"Hilito"	Song of the Year	Nominated	
Latin American Music Awards	2015	"Hilito"	Favorite Tropical Song	Nominated	
Latin American Music Awards	2017	Himself	Artist of the Year	Nominated	
Latin American Music Awards	2017	Himself	Favorite Tropical Artist	Nominated	
Latin American Music Awards	2017	"Imitadora"	Favorite Tropical Song	Nominated	
Latin American Music Awards	2017	Golden	Album of the Year	Nominated	
Latin American Music Awards	2017	Golden	Favorite Tropical Album	Nominated	
Latin American Music Awards	2018	Himself	Favorite Tropical Artist	Won	
Latin American Music Awards	2018	"Bella y Sensual" (with Daddy Yankee & Nicky Jam)	Favorite Tropical Song	Nominated	
Latin American Music Awards	2018	"Sobredosis" (with Ozuna)	Favorite Tropical Song	Nominated	
Latin American Music Awards	2018	Golden Tour	Favorite Tour	Nominated	
Latin American Music Awards	2019	Himself	Artist of the Year	Nominated	
Latin American Music Awards	2019	Himself	Favorite Male Artist	Nominated	
Latin American Music Awards	2019	Himself	Favorite Tropical Artist	Nominated	
Latin American Music Awards	2019	"Ella Quiere Beber (Remix)" (with Anuel AA)	Song of the Year	Nominated	
Latin American Music Awards	2019	"Ella Quiere Beber (Remix)" (with Anuel AA)	Favorite Urban Song	Nominated	
Latin American Music Awards	2019	"Centavito"	Favorite Tropical Song	Nominated	
Latin American Music Awards	2019	"Aullando" (with Wisin & Yandel)	Favorite Tropical Song	Nominated	
Latin American Music Awards	2019	Utopía	Favorite Tropical Album	Won	
Latin American Music Awards	2021	Himself	Favorite Tropical Artist	Won	
Latin American Music Awards	2021	"Nuestro Amor" (with Alex Bueno)	Favorite Tropical Song	Nominated	
Latin American Music Awards	2022	Himself	Favorite Tropical Artist	Won	
Latin American Music Awards	2023	Himself	Artist of the Year	Nominated	
Latin American Music Awards	2023	Himself	Favorite Tropical Artist	Won	
Latin American Music Awards	2023	"Sus Huellas"	Song of the Year	Nominated	
Latin American Music Awards	2023	"Sus Huellas"	Favorite Tropical Song	Nominated	
Latin American Music Awards	2023	"Sin Fin" (with Justin Timberlake)	Collaboration Crossover of the Year	Nominated	
Latin American Music Awards	2023	"El Pañuelo" (with Rosalía)	Best Collaboration – Tropical	Nominated	
Latin American Music Awards	2023	Fórmula, Vol. 3	Album of the Year	Nominated	
Latin American Music Awards	2023	Fórmula, Vol. 3	Favorite Tropical Album	Won	
Latin American Music Awards	2024	Himself	Artist of the Year	Nominated	
Latin American Music Awards	2024	Himself	Favorite Tropical Artist	Won	
Latin American Music Awards	2024	"Solo Conmigo"	Song of the Year	Nominated	
Latin American Music Awards	2024	"Solo Conmigo"	Favorite Tropical Song	Won	
Latin American Music Awards	2024	Fórmula, Vol. 3: La Gira	Tour of the Year	Nominated	
Latin Grammy Awards	2018	Golden	Best Contemporary Tropical Album	Nominated	
Latin Grammy Awards	2022	Romeo Santos: King of Bachata	Best Long Form Music Video	Nominated	
Latin Grammy Awards	2023	Formula, Vol. 3	Best Merengue/Bachata Album	Won	
Lo Nuestro Awards	2007	"No, No, No" (with Thalia)	Pop Song of the Year	Won	
Lo Nuestro Awards	2012	Himself	Tropical Male Artist of the Year	Nominated	
Lo Nuestro Awards	2012	Himself	Contemporary Tropical Artist of the Year	Nominated	
Lo Nuestro Awards	2012	"You"	Tropical Song of the Year	Nominated	
Lo Nuestro Awards	2013	Himself	Artist of the Year	Nominated	
Lo Nuestro Awards	2013	Himself	Tropical Male Artist of the Year	Nominated	
Lo Nuestro Awards	2013	Himself	Contemporary Tropical Artist of the Year	Nominated	
Lo Nuestro Awards	2013	"Mi Santa"	Collaboration of the Year	Nominated	
Lo Nuestro Awards	2013	"Mi Santa"	Tropical Song of the Year	Nominated	
Lo Nuestro Awards	2013	"La Diabla"	Tropical Song of the Year	Nominated	
Lo Nuestro Awards	2014	Himself	Tropical Male Artist of the Year	Nominated	
Lo Nuestro Awards	2014	Himself	Contemporary Tropical Artist of the Year	Nominated	
Lo Nuestro Awards	2014	"Llévame Contigo"	Tropical Song of the Year	Nominated	
Lo Nuestro Awards	2014	"Propuesta Indecente"	Video of the Year	Won	
Lo Nuestro Awards	2015	Himself	Artist of the Year	Won	
Lo Nuestro Awards	2015	Himself	Tropical Male Artist of the Year	Won	
Lo Nuestro Awards	2015	Himself	Contemporary Tropical Artist of the Year	Won	
Lo Nuestro Awards	2015	Formula, Vol. 2	Tropical Album of the Year	Won	
Lo Nuestro Awards	2015	"Propuesta Indecente"	Tropical Song of the Year	Won	
Lo Nuestro Awards	2015	"Loco" (with Enrique Iglesias)	Tropical Song of the Year	Nominated	
Lo Nuestro Awards	2015	"Odio" (with Drake)	Tropical Song of the Year	Nominated	
Lo Nuestro Awards	2015	"Loco" (with Enrique Iglesias)	Tropical Collaboration of the Year	Won	
Lo Nuestro Awards	2015	"Odio" (with Drake)	Tropical Collaboration of the Year	Nominated	
Lo Nuestro Awards	2016	Himself	Artist of the Year	Nominated	
Lo Nuestro Awards	2016	Himself	Tropical Male Artist of the Year	Nominated	
Lo Nuestro Awards	2016	Himself	Tropical Artist of the Year	Nominated	
Lo Nuestro Awards	2016	"Yo También" (with Marc Anthony)	Collaboration of the Year	Nominated	
Lo Nuestro Awards	2016	"Yo También" (with Marc Anthony)	Tropical Song of the Year	Nominated	
Lo Nuestro Awards	2016	"Eres Mía"	Tropical Song of the Year	Nominated	
Lo Nuestro Awards	2016	"Hilito"	Tropical Song of the Year	Nominated	
Lo Nuestro Awards	2017	Himself	Artist of the Year	Nominated	
Lo Nuestro Awards	2017	Himself	Male Artist of the Year	Nominated	
Lo Nuestro Awards	2017	Himself	Tropical Artist of the Year	Nominated	
Lo Nuestro Awards	2017	Himself	Excellence Award	Won	
Lo Nuestro Awards	2019	Golden Tour	Tour of the Year	Nominated	
Lo Nuestro Awards	2020	Himself	Artist of the Year	Nominated	
Lo Nuestro Awards	2020	Himself	Tropical Artist of the Year	Won	
Lo Nuestro Awards	2020	Utopía	Album of the Year	Nominated	
Lo Nuestro Awards	2021	Himself	Tropical Artist of the Year	Won	
Lo Nuestro Awards	2021	"La Mejor Versión de Mi (Remix)" (with Natti Natasha)	Song of the Year	Nominated	
Lo Nuestro Awards	2021	"La Mejor Versión de Mi (Remix)" (with Natti Natasha)	Remix of the Year	Nominated	
Lo Nuestro Awards	2021	"La Mejor Versión de Mi (Remix)" (with Natti Natasha)	Tropical Song of the Year	Won	
Lo Nuestro Awards	2021	"Nuestro Amor" (with Alex Bueno)	Tropical Collaboration of the Year	Won	
Lo Nuestro Awards	2022	Himself	Tropical Artist of the Year	Won	
Lo Nuestro Awards	2022	"Fan De Tus Fotos" (with Nicky Jam)	Pop Collaboration of the Year	Nominated	
Lo Nuestro Awards	2022	Utopía Live From Metlife Stadium	Album of the Year	Nominated	
Lo Nuestro Awards	2023	Himself	Tropical Artist of the Year	Won	
Lo Nuestro Awards	2023	"Sus Huellas"	Song of the Year	Nominated	
Lo Nuestro Awards	2023	"Sus Huellas"	Tropical Song of the Year	Won	
Lo Nuestro Awards	2023	"Sin Fin" (with Justin Timberlake)	Crossover Collaboration of the Year	Nominated	
Lo Nuestro Awards	2023	"El Pañuelo" (with Rosalía)	The Perfect Mix of the Year	Nominated	
Lo Nuestro Awards	2024	Himself	Tropical Artist of the Year	Won	
Lo Nuestro Awards	2024	Formula, Vol. 3	Album of the Year	Nominated	
Lo Nuestro Awards	2024	Formula, Vol. 3	Tropical Album of the Year	Won	
Lo Nuestro Awards	2024	Fórmula, Vol. 3: La Gira	Tour of the Year	Nominated	
Lo Nuestro Awards	2024	"El Pañuelo" (with Rosalía)	The Perfect Mix of the Year	Nominated	
Lo Nuestro Awards	2024	"El Pañuelo" (with Rosalía)	Tropical Collaboration of the Year	Won	
Lo Nuestro Awards	2024	"Solo Conmigo"	Tropical Song of the Year	Nominated	
Lo Nuestro Awards	2026	Himself	Artist of the Year	Nominated	
Lo Nuestro Awards	2026	Himself	Tropical – Artist of the Year	Won	
Lo Nuestro Awards	2026	"Khé?" (with Rauw Alejandro)	Song of the Year	Nominated	
Lo Nuestro Awards	2026	"Khé?" (with Rauw Alejandro)	The Perfect Mix of the Year	Nominated	
LOS40 Music Awards	2026	Himself	Global Icon Award	Won	
LOS40 Music Awards	2026	Himself	Best Latin Artist or Group	Nominated	
LOS40 Music Awards	2026	Himself	Best Live Artist or Group	Nominated	
LOS40 Music Awards	2026	"Dardos" (with Prince Royce)	Best Latin Song	Won	
LOS40 Music Awards	2026	Better Late Than Never	Best Latin Album	Won	
LOS40 Music Awards	2026	Mejor Tarde Que Nunca Tour	Best Latin Tour or Concert	Nominated	
Los Premios 40 Principales América	2014	Himself	Best Dominican Act	Nominated	
Los Premios 40 Principales América	2014	Himself	Best Spanish Language Act	Nominated	
Los Premios 40 Principales América	2014	Formula, Vol. 2	Best Spanish Language Album	Nominated	
MTV Video Music Awards	2012	Himself	Best Latino Artist	Won	
MTV Video Music Awards	2025	"Khé?" (with Rauw Alejandro)	Best Latin	Nominated	
Oye! Awards	2013	Himself	Urban Soloist or Group	Nominated	
Premios Juventud	2007	"No, No, No" (with Thalia)	The Perfect Combo	Nominated	
Premios Juventud	2007	"No, No, No" (with Thalia)	Heart-Wrenching Song	Nominated	
Premios Juventud	2007	"No, No, No" (with Thalia)	My Favorite Video	Nominated	
Premios Juventud	2012	Formula, Vol. 1	Just Play It All	Won	
Premios Juventud	2012	"Promise" (with Usher)	The Perfect Combo	Won	
Premios Juventud	2012	"Promise" (with Usher)	Catchiest Tune	Nominated	
Premios Juventud	2012	"Promise" (with Usher)	Heart-Wrenching Song	Nominated	
Premios Juventud	2012	"Promise" (with Usher)	My Ringtone	Nominated	
Premios Juventud	2012	"Promise" (with Usher)	My Favorite Video	Nominated	
Premios Juventud	2012	"Mi Santa"	My Favorite Video	Nominated	
Premios Juventud	2012	Himself	Best Moves	Nominated	
Premios Juventud	2012	Himself	Red Hot Artist	Nominated	
Premios Juventud	2012	Himself	Favorite Tropical Artist	Nominated	
Premios Juventud	2012	Formula, Vol. 1 Tour	My Favorite Concert	Nominated	
Premios Juventud	2013	Himself	Best Moves	Nominated	
Premios Juventud	2013	Himself	Red Hot Artist	Nominated	
Premios Juventud	2013	Himself	Favorite Tropical Artist	Nominated	
Premios Juventud	2013	"Llévame Contigo"	Catchiest Tune	Nominated	
Premios Juventud	2013	"Llévame Contigo"	Heart-Wrenching Song	Nominated	
Premios Juventud	2013	"Llévame Contigo"	My Ringtone	Nominated	
Premios Juventud	2013	Formula, Vol. 1 Tour	My Favorite Concert	Nominated	
Premios Juventud	2014	Himself	Follow me The Good	Nominated	
Premios Juventud	2014	"Loco" (with Enrique Iglesias)	The Perfect Combo	Nominated	
Premios Juventud	2014	"Odio" (with Drake)	The Perfect Combo	Nominated	
Premios Juventud	2014	Fórmula Vol. 2	Just Play It All	Won	
Premios Juventud	2015	Himself	Red Hot Artist	Nominated	
Premios Juventud	2015	"Yo También" (with Marc Anthony)	The Perfect Combo	Nominated	
Premios Juventud	2016	Himself	Favorite Tropical Artist	Nominated	
Premios Juventud	2019	"Ella Quiere Beber (Remix)" (with Anuel AA)	Best Song: Can't Get Enough of This Song	Nominated	
Premios Juventud	2019	"Ella Quiere Beber (Remix)" (with Anuel AA)	Best Song: The Traffic Jam	Won	
Premios Juventud	2021	"Tú Vas a Tener Que Explicarme (Remix)" (with La Ross Maria)	Tropical Mix (Song with the Best Tropical Collaboration)	Nominated	
Premios Juventud	2022	Himself	Artist of the Youth – Male	Nominated	
Premios Juventud	2022	"Sus Huellas"	The Catchiest Song	Nominated	
Premios Juventud	2022	"Sus Huellas"	Best Tropical Hit	Won	
Premios Juventud	2022	"Fan De Tus Fotos" (with Nicky Jam)	The Perfect Mix	Nominated	
Premios Juventud	2023	Himself	Artist of the Youth – Male	Nominated	
Premios Juventud	2023	"Sin Fin" (with Justin Timberlake)	OMG Collaboration	Nominated	
Premios Juventud	2023	"Solo Conmigo"	Best Tropical Hit	Nominated	
Premios Juventud	2023	"El Pañuelo" (with Rosalía)	Best Tropical Mix	Nominated	
Premios Juventud	2023	Fórmula, Vol. 3	Best Tropical Album	Won	
Premios Juventud	2026	Himself	Artist of the Youth – Male	Nominated	
Premios Juventud	2026	Better Late Than Never	Album of the Year	Nominated	
Premios Juventud	2026	Better Late Than Never	Best Tropical Album	Won	
Premios Juventud	2026	Mejor Tarde Que Nunca Tour	Best Tour	Nominated	
Premios Juventud	2026	"Dardos" (with Prince Royce)	Tropical Hit	Won	
Premios Juventud	2026	"Lokita Por Mi" (with Prince Royce)	Tropical Mix	Won	
Premios Tu Mundo	2012	Himself	Soy Sexy and I Know It	Nominated	
Premios Tu Mundo	2012	"Mi Santa"	Song That Steals My Heart	Nominated	
Premios Tu Mundo	2014	Himself	Favorite Tropical Artist	Nominated	
Premios Tu Mundo	2015	Himself	Favorite Tropical Artist	Won	
Premios Tu Mundo	2017	Himself	Favorite Tropical Artist	Nominated	
Premios Tu Música Urbano	2019	"Ella Quiere Beber (Remix)" (with Anuel AA)	Remix of the Year	Nominated	
Premios Tu Música Urbano	2019	"Ella Quiere Beber (Remix)" (with Anuel AA)	Collaboration of the Year	Nominated	
Premios Tu Música Urbano	2019	"Ella Quiere Beber (Remix)" (with Anuel AA)	Video of the Year	Nominated	
Premios Tu Música Urbano	2020	"Ella Quiere Beber (Remix)" (with Anuel AA)	Remix of the Year	Won	
Premios Tu Música Urbano	2023	Himself	Top Artist - Tropical Urban	Won	
Premios Tu Música Urbano	2023	"X Si Volvemos" (with Karol G)	Top Song - Pop Urban	Won	
Premios Tu Música Urbano	2025	Himself	Top Artist - Tropical	Nominated	
Premios Tu Música Urbano	2025	"Khé?" (with Rauw Alejandro)	Top Song - Tropical	Won	
Premios Tu Música Urbano	2026	Himself	Top Artist - Tropical	Nominated	
Premios Tu Música Urbano	2026	"Dardos" (with Prince Royce)	Collaboration of the Year	Won	
Premios Tu Música Urbano	2026	"Lokita Por Mi" (with Prince Royce)	Top Song - Tropical	Nominated	
Premios Tu Música Urbano	2026	Better Late Than Never	Top Album - Tropical	Nominated	
Rolling Stone en Español Awards	2023	Fórmula Vol. 3	Album of the Year	Nominated	
Rolling Stone en Español Awards	2026	"Ay! San Miguel" (with Prince Royce)	Collaboration of the Year	Pending	
Soberano Awards	2006	Himself	Composer of the Year	Won	
Soberano Awards	2007	Himself	Composer of the Year	Won	
Soberano Awards	2008	Himself	Composer of the Year	Nominated	
Soberano Awards	2009	Himself	Composer of the Year	Nominated	
Soberano Awards	2012	Himself	Composer of the Year	Nominated	
Soberano Awards	2012	"You"	Bachata Song of the Year	Nominated	
Soberano Awards	2013	Himself	Most-Played Artist on Radio	Won	
Soberano Awards	2013	"La Diabla"	Bachata Song of the Year	Nominated	
Soberano Awards	2013	Formula	Concert of the Year	Won	
Soberano Awards	2013	Formula, Vol. 1	Album of the Year	Won	
Soberano Awards	2014	Himself	Most-Played Artist on Radio	Nominated	
Soberano Awards	2014	Himself	Composer of the Year	Won	
Soberano Awards	2014	"Propuesta Indecente"	Bachata Song of the Year	Nominated	
Soberano Awards	2015	Himself	Most-Played Artist on Radio	Won	
Soberano Awards	2015	Himself	Composer of the Year	Won	
Soberano Awards	2015	Formula, Vol. 2	Album of the Year	Won	
Soberano Awards	2015	"Eres Mía"	Bachata Song of the Year	Won	
Soberano Awards	2016	Himself	Composer of the Year	Nominated	
Soberano Awards	2016	Himself	Featured Artist and/or Popular Group Abroad	Won	
Soberano Awards	2016	"Yo También" (with Marc Anthony)	Collaboration of the Year	Won	
Soberano Awards	2017	Himself	Featured Artist and/or Popular Group Abroad	Nominated	
Soberano Awards	2018	Himself	Featured Artist and/or Popular Group Abroad	Nominated	
Soberano Awards	2018	Himself	Composer of the Year	Nominated	
Soberano Awards	2018	Golden	Album of the Year	Nominated	
Soberano Awards	2019	Himself	Composer of the Year	Nominated	
Soberano Awards	2019	"El Beso Que No Le Dí" (with Kiko Rodríguez)	Bachata of the Year	Nominated	
Soberano Awards	2019	Utopía	Album of the Year	Nominated	
Soberano Awards	2019	"Canalla" (with El Chaval de la Bachata)	Collaboration of the Year	Nominated	
Soberano Awards	2021	"El Pañuelo" (with Rosalia)	Collaboration of the Year	Nominated	
Soberano Awards	2021	"Siri" (with Chris Lebron)	Collaboration of the Year	Nominated	
Soberano Awards	2021	Fórmula Vol. 3	Album of the Year	Won	
Soberano Awards	2024	Himself	Featured Artist and/or Popular Group Abroad	Nominated	
Soberano Awards	2024	"Boomerang"	Bachata of the Year	Nominated	

== See also ==
- List of awards and nominations received by Aventura
