= 2015 Billboard Music Awards =

Annual American music awards ceremony

- Date: May 17, 2015
- Location: MGM Grand Garden Arena, Las Vegas, Nevada, U.S.
- Hosted by: Ludacris; Chrissy Teigen

Highlights
- Most awards: Taylor Swift (8)
- Most nominations: Taylor Swift (14)

Television/radio coverage
- Network: ABC

The 2015 Billboard Music Awards ceremony was held on May 17, 2015, at the MGM Grand Garden Arena in Las Vegas. It was aired live on ABC. The show was hosted by Ludacris and Chrissy Teigen.

Taylor Swift won 8 out of her 14 nominations, including Top Artist, Top Female Artist and Top Billboard 200 Album for 1989. Other winners included Sam Smith, Iggy Azalea and Pharrell Williams scoring three trophies each. Meghan Trainor, One Direction, Jason Aldean, John Legend, Enrique Iglesias and Hozier won two categories. Swift premiered her "Bad Blood" music video at the start of the show. Mariah Carey performed at the ceremony for the first time since 1999.

== Performers ==
Artist(s)	Song(s)	Presented by
Van Halen	"Panama"	Taylor Swift, Ellen Pompeo, Lily ALdridge, Hailee Steinfeld, Zendaya, And Martha Hunt
Fall Out Boy; Wiz Khalifa	"Uma Thurman"	Chrissy Teigen
Nick Jonas	"Jealous"	Britt Nilsson and Kaitlyn Bristowe
Meghan Trainor; John Legend	"Like I'm Gonna Lose You"	Chrissy Teigen
Mariah Carey	"Vision of Love" "Infinity"	Idina Menzel
Wiz Khalifa; Charlie Puth; Lindsey Stirling	"See You Again"	Ludacris and Tyrese Gibson
Jussie Smollett; Bryshere 'Yazz' Gray; Estelle	"Conqueror" "You're So Beautiful"	Taraji P. Henson
Hozier	"Take Me to Church"	Chrissy Teigen
Little Big Town; Faith Hill	"Girl Crush"	Florida Georgia Line
Pitbull; Chris Brown	"Fun"	Jennifer Lopez
Ed Sheeran	"Bloodstream"	Zendaya
Britney Spears; Iggy Azalea	"Pretty Girls"	Ludacris
Nicki Minaj; David Guetta	"The Night Is Still Young" "Hey Mama"	Fifth Harmony
Tori Kelly	"Nobody Love"	Ludacris
Simple Minds	"Don't You (Forget About Me)"	Molly Ringwald
Kelly Clarkson	"Invincible"	Pentatonix
Imagine Dragons	"Stand by Me"	John Legend
Kanye West	"All Day" "Black Skinhead"	Kendall Jenner and Kylie Jenner

== Presenters ==
- Taylor Swift, Ellen Pompeo, Zendaya, Lily Aldridge, Hailee Steinfeld, Martha Hunt – Introduced Van Halen
- Lily Aldridge & Charli XCX – Presented Top Duo/Group
- Laverne Cox & Tracee Ellis Ross – Presented Top Billboard 200 Album
- Chrissy Teigen – Introduced Fall Out Boy & Wiz Khalifa
- Kaitlyn Bristowe & Britt Nilsson from The Bachelorette – Introduced Nick Jonas
- Chrissy Teigen – Introduced Meghan Trainor & John Legend
- Idina Menzel – Introduced Mariah Carey
- Danica McKellar – Presented Top Rap Song
- Ludacris & Tyrese Gibson – Introduced Wiz Khalifa, Charlie Puth, and Lindsey Stirling
- Celine Dion – Presented Top Male Artist
- Taraji P. Henson – Introduced Jussie Smollett, Bryshere 'Yazz' Gray, and Estelle
- One Direction – Presented Top Radio Song
- Florida Georgia Line – Introduced Little Big Town & Faith Hill
- Ellen Pompeo – Presented Top Female Artist
- Kira Kazantsev & Pete Wentz – Presented Top Touring Artist
- Jennifer Lopez – Introduced Pitbull & Chris Brown
- Zendaya – Introduced Ed Sheeran
- 50 Cent & Rita Ora – Presented Top Hot 100 Song
- Ludacris – Introduced Britney Spears & Iggy Azalea
- Prince Royce – Presented Billboard Chart Achievement Award
- Fifth Harmony – Introduced Nicki Minaj & David Guetta
- Molly Ringwald – Introduced Simple Minds
- Pentatonix – Introduced Kelly Clarkson
- Brett Eldredge & Hailee Steinfeld – Presented Top Country Artist
- John Legend – Introduced Imagine Dragons
- Kevin Connolly, Kevin Dillon, Jerry Ferrara, and Adrian Grenier – Presented Top Artist Award
- Kendall Jenner & Kylie Jenner – Introduced Kanye West

== Winners and nominees ==
Winners are listed first and in bold.

Top Artist	Top New Artist
**Taylor Swift**; Ariana Grande; One Direction; Katy Perry; Sam Smith	**Sam Smith**; 5 Seconds of Summer; Iggy Azalea; Hozier; Meghan Trainor
Top Male Artist	Top Female Artist
**Sam Smith**; Drake; Ed Sheeran; Justin Timberlake; Pharrell Williams	**Taylor Swift**; Iggy Azalea; Ariana Grande; Katy Perry; Meghan Trainor
Top Duo/Group	Top Touring Artist
**One Direction**; 5 Seconds Of Summer; Florida Georgia Line; MAGIC!; Maroon 5	**One Direction**; Lady Gaga; Katy Perry; The Rolling Stones; Justin Timberlake
Top Billboard 200 Artist	Top Billboard 200 Album
**Taylor Swift**; One Direction; Pentatonix; Ed Sheeran; Sam Smith	**1989 – Taylor Swift**; V – Maroon 5; That's Christmas to Me – Pentatonix; x – Ed Sheeran; In the Lonely Hour – Sam Smith
Top Hot 100 Artist	Top Hot 100 Song
**Taylor Swift**; Iggy Azalea; Ariana Grande; Sam Smith; Meghan Trainor	**"All About That Bass" – Meghan Trainor**; "Fancy" – Iggy Azalea featuring Charli XCX; "All of Me" – John Legend; "Stay with Me" – Sam Smith; "Shake It Off" – Taylor Swift
Top Radio Songs Artist	Top Radio Song
**Sam Smith**; John Legend; Maroon 5; Ed Sheeran; Taylor Swift	**"All of Me" – John Legend**; "Rude" – MAGIC!; "Am I Wrong" – Nico & Vinz; "Stay with Me" – Sam Smith; "Happy" – Pharrell Williams
Top Digital Songs Artist	Top Digital Song
**Taylor Swift**; Iggy Azalea; Ed Sheeran; Sam Smith; Meghan Trainor	**"All About That Bass" – Meghan Trainor**; "Uptown Funk" – Mark Ronson featuring Bruno Mars; "Stay with Me" – Sam Smith; "Shake It Off – Taylor Swift; "Happy" – Pharrell Williams
Top Social Artist (fan-voted)	Top Streaming Artist
**Justin Bieber**; Miley Cyrus; Selena Gomez; Ariana Grande; Taylor Swift	**Iggy Azalea**; Ariana Grande; Nicki Minaj; Meghan Trainor; Taylor Swift
Top Streaming Song (Audio)	Top Streaming Song (Video)
**"All of Me" – John Legend**; "Fancy" – Iggy Azalea featuring Charli XCX; "Take Me to Church" – Hozier; "Habits (Stay High)" – Tove Lo; "Stay with Me" – Sam Smith	**"Shake It Off" – Taylor Swift**; "Let It Go" – Idina Menzel; "Hot Boy" – Bobby Shmurda; "Blank Space" – Taylor Swift; "All About That Bass" – Meghan Trainor
Top Christian Artist	Top Christian Song
**Hillsong United**; Casting Crowns; Lecrae; MercyMe; Newsboys	**"Something in the Water" – Carrie Underwood**; "He Knows My Name" – Francesca Battistelli; "Oceans (Where Feet May Fail)" – Hillsong United; "Greater" – MercyMe; "We Believe" – Newsboys
Top Christian Album	Top Country Artist
**Anomaly – Lecrae**; Thrive – Casting Crowns; Welcome to the New – MercyMe; Rivers in the Wasteland – NEEDTOBREATHE; Love Ran Red – Chris Tomlin	**Florida Georgia Line**; Jason Aldean; Luke Bryan; Brantley Gilbert; Blake Shelton
Top Country Song	Top Country Album
**"Burnin' It Down" – Jason Aldean**; "Play It Again" – Luke Bryan; "Leave the Night On" – Sam Hunt; "This Is How We Roll" – Florida Georgia Line featuring Luke Bryan; "Dirt" – Florida Georgia Line	**Old Boots, New Dirt – Jason Aldean**; Man Against Machine – Garth Brooks; Crash My Party – Luke Bryan; Just as I Am – Brantley Gilbert; Platinum – Miranda Lambert
Top Dance/Electronic Artist	Top Dance/Electronic Song
**Calvin Harris**; Avicii; Clean Bandit; Disclosure; Lindsey Stirling	**"Turn Down for What" – DJ Snake & Lil Jon**; "Rather Be" – Clean Bandit featuring Jess Glynne; "Latch" – Disclosure featuring Sam Smith; "Break Free" – Ariana Grande featuring Zedd; "Summer" – Calvin Harris
Top Dance/Electronic Album	Top Latin Artist
**Shatter Me – Lindsey Stirling**; True – Avicii; Settle – Disclosure; Motion – Calvin Harris; Recess – Skrillex	**Romeo Santos**; J Balvin; Juan Gabriel; Enrique Iglesias; Prince Royce
Top Latin Song	Top Latin Album
**"Bailando" – Enrique Iglesias featuring Descemer Bueno & Gente de Zona**; "6 AM" – J Balvin featuring Farruko; "Eres Mía" – Romeo Santos; "Odio" – Romeo Santos featuring Drake; "Propuesta Indecente" – Romeo Santos	**Sex and Love – Enrique Iglesias**; Los Dúo – Juan Gabriel; Formula, Vol. 2 – Romeo Santos; Corazón – Santana; 3.0 – Marc Anthony
Top R&B Artist	Top R&B Song
**Pharrell Williams**; Beyoncé; Chris Brown; John Legend; Trey Songz	**"Happy" – Pharrell Williams**; "Loyal" – Chris Brown featuring Lil Wayne, French Montana, Too $hort & Tyga; "Talk Dirty" – Jason Derulo featuring 2 Chainz; "Don't Tell 'Em" – Jeremih featuring YG; "All of Me" – John Legend
Top R&B Album	Top Rap Artist
**G I R L – Pharrell Williams**; Beyoncé – Beyoncé; X – Chris Brown; Xscape – Michael Jackson; Love in the Future – John Legend	**Iggy Azalea**; J. Cole; Drake; Nicki Minaj; Rae Sremmurd
Top Rap Song	Top Rap Album
**"Fancy" – Iggy Azalea featuring Charli XCX**; "Black Widow" – Iggy Azalea featuring Rita Ora; "I Don't F**k With You" – Big Sean featuring E-40; "Anaconda" – Nicki Minaj; "Hot Boy" – Bobby Shmurda	**2014 Forest Hills Drive – J. Cole**; The Marshall Mathers LP 2 – Eminem; If You're Reading This It's Too Late – Drake; The New Classic – Iggy Azalea; The Pinkprint – Nicki Minaj
Top Rock Artist	Top Rock Song
**Hozier**; Bastille; Coldplay; Fall Out Boy; Lorde	**"Take Me to Church" – Hozier**; "Pompeii" – Bastille; "A Sky Full of Stars" – Coldplay; "Centuries" – Fall Out Boy; "Ain't It Fun" – Paramore
Top Rock Album	Top Soundtrack
**Ghost Stories – Coldplay**; Rock or Bust – AC/DC; Turn Blue – The Black Keys; Hozier – Hozier; Pure Heroine – Lorde	**Frozen**; The Fault in Our Stars; Fifty Shades of Grey; Guardians of the Galaxy: Awesome Mix: Vol. 1; Into the Woods
Billboard Chart Achievement (fan-voted)
**Taylor Swift**; Iggy Azalea; Meghan Trainor

== Artists with multiple wins and nominations ==
Artists that received multiple nominations
Nominations	Artist
14	Taylor Swift
13	Sam Smith
12	Iggy Azalea
9	Meghan Trainor
7	John Legend
6	Ariana Grande
6	Pharrell Williams
5	Hozier
5	Ed Sheeran
5	Romeo Santos
4	Luke Bryan
4	Drake
4	Florida Georgia Line
4	One Direction
4	Katy Perry
3	Jason Aldean
3	Chris Brown
3	Coldplay
3	Disclosure
3	Calvin Harris
3	Enrique Iglesias
3	Maroon 5
3	MercyMe
3	Nicki Minaj
3	Charli XCX
2	5 Seconds of Summer
2	Avicii
2	J Balvin
2	Bastille
2	Beyoncé
2	Casting Crowns
2	Clean Bandit
2	Fall Out Boy
2	Juan Gabriel
2	Hillsong United
2	J. Cole
2	Lorde
2	MAGIC!
2	Newsboys
2	Pentatonix
2	Bobby Shmurda
2	Lindsey Stirling
2	Justin Timberlake

Artists that received multiple awards
Wins	Artist
8	Taylor Swift
3	Iggy Azalea
3	Sam Smith
3	Pharrell Williams
2	Jason Aldean
2	Hozier
2	Enrique Iglesias
2	John Legend
2	One Direction
2	Meghan Trainor
