= 2015 Latin Billboard Music Awards =

Annual American music awards ceremony

- Awarded for: the most popular albums, songs, and performers in Latin music in 2014, according to Billboard magazine
- Sponsored by: State Farm Insurance
- Date: April 30, 2015
- Location: BankUnited Center, University of Miami, Coral Gables, Florida
- Country: United States
- Presented by: Billboard magazine
- Most awards: Romeo Santos (10)
- Most nominations: Romeo Santos (21)

Television/radio coverage
- Network: Telemundo

The 2015 Billboard Latin Music Awards, recognizes the best-selling albums, songs, and performers in Latin music in 2014, as determined by their chart performance on Billboard's weekly charts. The ceremony was broadcast live on Telemundo on April 30, 2015, from the BankUnited Center at the University of Miami in Coral Gables, Florida.

American singer-songwriter Romeo Santos won 10 awards including Artist of the Year. Spanish artist Enrique Iglesias was also a multiple winner in categories such as Hot Latin Song of the Year for "Bailando" and Latin Pop Album of the Year for Sex and Love. Special awards were also handed out. Brazilian singer-songwriter Roberto Carlos received the Lifetime Achievement Award and Mexican-American Carlos Santana was honored with the Billboard "Spirit of Hope Award".

== Winners and nominees ==
The nominees for the Billboard Latin Music Awards were announced on February 9, 2015, during the broadcast of the morning show Un Nuevo Día. American singer Romeo Santos received the most nominations, with 21; Spanish artist Enrique Iglesias earned 19 nominations. Santos and Iglesias broke the record held by reggaeton performers Tito El Bambino and Don Omar in 2010 and 2013, respectively, for the most nominated act in a single ceremony. Colombian artist J Balvin was nominated seven times, while Mexican acts Julion Alvarez y Su Norteño Banda and Banda Sinaloense MS de Sergio Lizarraga received six. Five-time nominated artists include Mexican singer-songwriter Marco Antonio Solís, American band Santana and American singer Prince Royce. The nominees and winners are determined by sales, radio airplay, streaming and social data, from February 1, 2014 –January 31, 2015, as it is compiled by Billboard magazine every week.

Santos resulted the most awarded performer, earning ten accolades, including Artist of the Year, Songwriter of the Year, Producer of the Year, Top Latin Album (Formula, Vol. 2) and Tropical Album of the Year (Formula, Vol. 2), among others. Iglesias received nine awards, including Latin Pop Album of the Year (Sex & Love), Latin Pop Song, Airplay Song, Hot Latin Song, and Streaming Song of the Year for the single "Bailando". Brazilian singer-songwriter Roberto Carlos received the Lifetime Achievement Award and Mexican-American artist Carlos Santana was honored with the Billboard "Spirit of Hope Award".

Winners are listed first, highlighted in boldface and indicated with a double-dagger (‡).

=== Artists ===
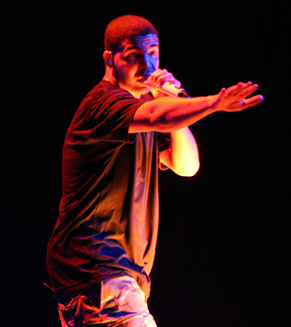
Canadian rapper Drake (pictured in 2010), earned the Crossover Artist of the Year award

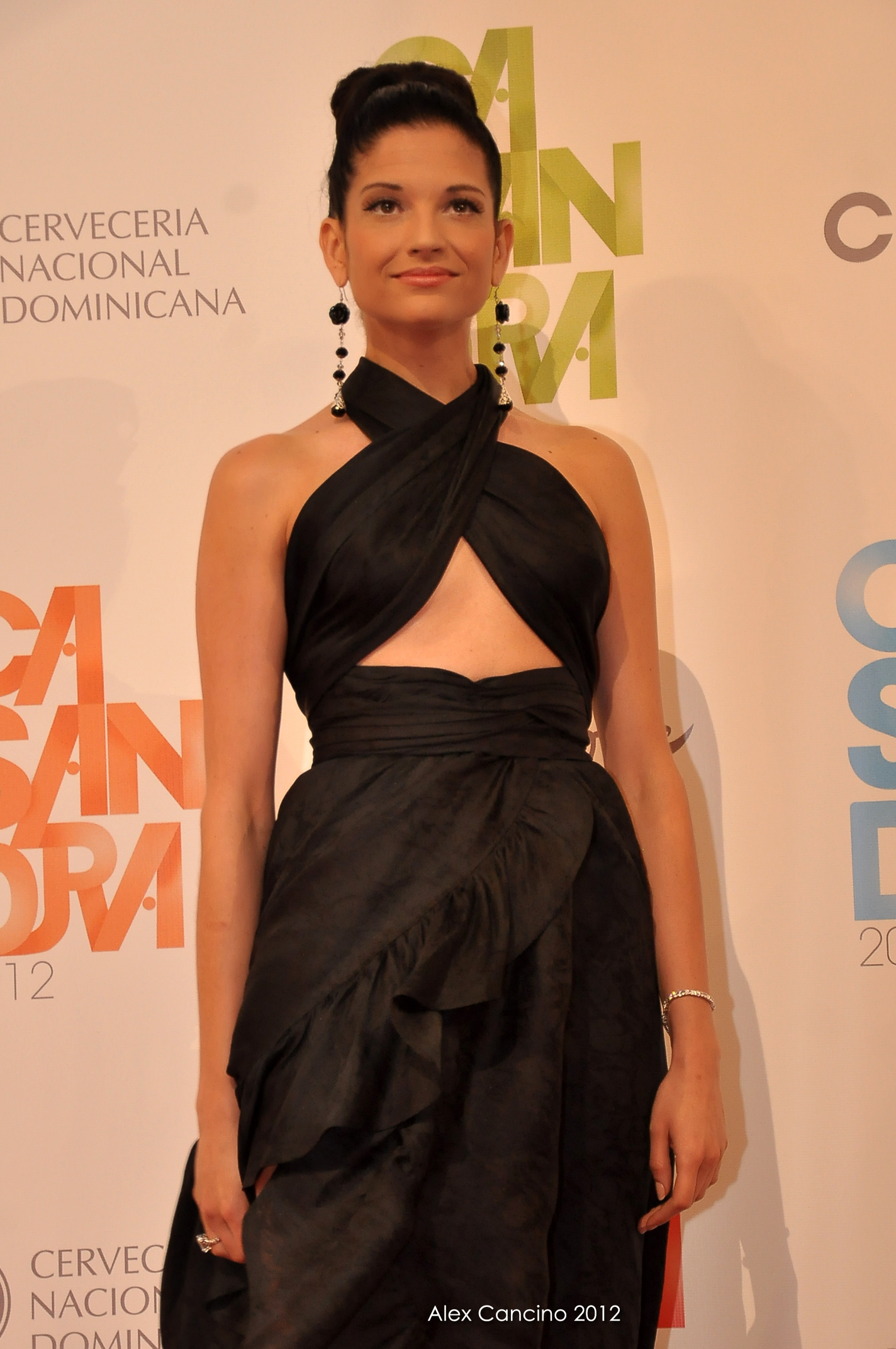
Spanish singer Natalia Jiménez (pictured in 2012), received the Hot Latin Songs Artist of the Year, Female accolade

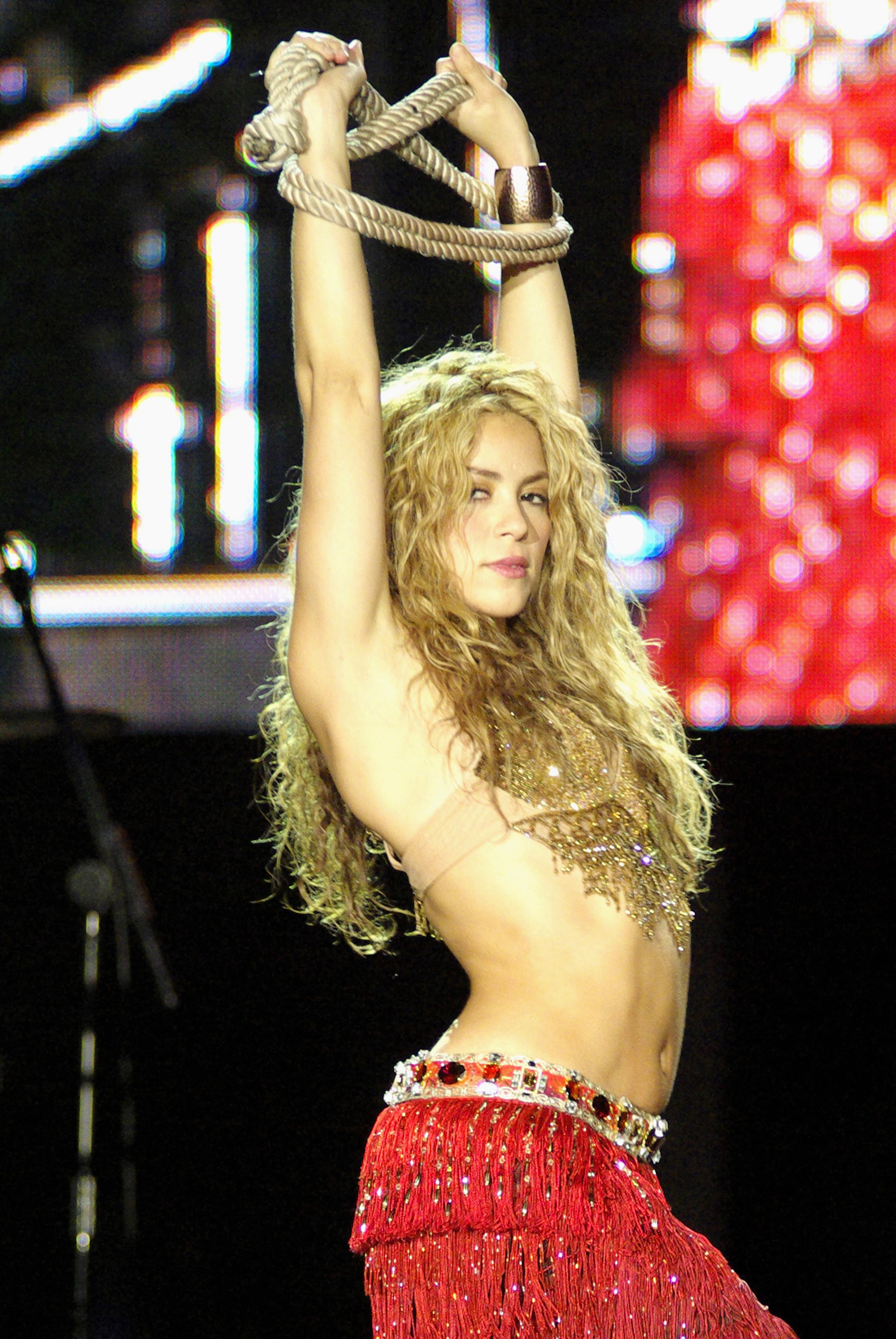
Colombian artist Shakira (pictured in 2008), is the Social Artist of 2015

Category	Recipient
Artist of the Year	Romeo Santos‡
Artist of the Year	Marc Anthony
Artist of the Year	Enrique Iglesias
Artist of the Year	Prince Royce
New Artist of the Year	J Balvin‡
New Artist of the Year	Banda Tierra Sagrada
New Artist of the Year	Kevin Ortiz
New Artist of the Year	Remmy Valenzuela
Tour of the Year	Marc Anthony‡
Tour of the Year	Alejandro Fernández
Tour of the Year	Juan Gabriel
Tour of the Year	Enrique Iglesias & Pitbull
Social Artist of the Year	Shakira‡
Social Artist of the Year	La Arrolladora Banda el Limón de René Camacho
Social Artist of the Year	Enrique Iglesias
Social Artist of the Year	Romeo Santos
Crossover Artist of the Year	Drake‡
Crossover Artist of the Year	Jason Derulo
Crossover Artist of the Year	Becky G
Crossover Artist of the Year	Pharrell Williams
Hot Latin Songs Artist of the Year, Male	Romeo Santos‡
Hot Latin Songs Artist of the Year, Male	J Balvin
Hot Latin Songs Artist of the Year, Male	Enrique Iglesias
Hot Latin Songs Artist of the Year, Male	Prince Royce
Hot Latin Songs Artist of the Year, Female	Natalia Jiménez‡
Hot Latin Songs Artist of the Year, Female	Chiquis
Hot Latin Songs Artist of the Year, Female	Jenni Rivera
Hot Latin Songs Artist of the Year, Female	Shakira
Hot Latin Songs Artist of the Year, Duo or Group	Banda Sinaloense MS de Sergio Lizarraga‡
Hot Latin Songs Artist of the Year, Duo or Group	Julión Álvarez y su Norteño Banda
Hot Latin Songs Artist of the Year, Duo or Group	Banda Los Recoditos
Hot Latin Songs Artist of the Year, Duo or Group	Calibre 50
Top Latin Albums Artist of the Year, Male	Romeo Santos‡
Top Latin Albums Artist of the Year, Male	Marc Anthony
Top Latin Albums Artist of the Year, Male	Enrique Iglesias
Top Latin Albums Artist of the Year, Male	Juan Gabriel
Top Latin Albums Artist of the Year, Female	Jenni Rivera‡
Top Latin Albums Artist of the Year, Female	Ana Gabriel
Top Latin Albums Artist of the Year, Female	Lucero
Top Latin Albums Artist of the Year, Female	Thalía
Top Latin Albums Artist of the Year, Duo or Group	Santana‡
Top Latin Albums Artist of the Year, Duo or Group	Julión Álvarez y su Norteño Banda
Top Latin Albums Artist of the Year, Duo or Group	Banda Sinaloense MS de Sergio Lizarraga
Top Latin Albums Artist of the Year, Duo or Group	Calibre 50
Latin Pop Songs Artist of the Year, Solo	Enrique Iglesias‡
Latin Pop Songs Artist of the Year, Solo	Ricardo Arjona
Latin Pop Songs Artist of the Year, Solo	Juanes
Latin Pop Songs Artist of the Year, Solo	Ricky Martin
Latin Pop Songs Artist of the Year, Duo or Group	Camila‡
Latin Pop Songs Artist of the Year, Duo or Group	Jesse & Joy
Latin Pop Songs Artist of the Year, Duo or Group	La Ley
Latin Pop Songs Artist of the Year, Duo or Group	Santana
Latin Pop Albums Artist of the Year, Solo	Enrique Iglesias‡
Latin Pop Albums Artist of the Year, Solo	Ricardo Arjona
Latin Pop Albums Artist of the Year, Solo	Chayanne
Latin Pop Albums Artist of the Year, Solo	Marco Antonio Solís
Latin Pop Albums Artist of the Year, Duo or Group	Santana‡
Latin Pop Albums Artist of the Year, Duo or Group	Camila
Latin Pop Albums Artist of the Year, Duo or Group	Grupo Nueva Vida
Latin Pop Albums Artist of the Year, Duo or Group	Tercer Cielo
Tropical Songs Artist of the Year, Solo	Romeo Santos‡
Tropical Songs Artist of the Year, Solo	Marc Anthony
Tropical Songs Artist of the Year, Solo	Prince Royce
Tropical Songs Artist of the Year, Solo	Víctor Manuelle
Tropical Songs Artist of the Year, Duo or Group	Chino & Nacho‡
Tropical Songs Artist of the Year, Duo or Group	Alexis & Fido
Tropical Songs Artist of the Year, Duo or Group	Baby Rasta & Gringo
Tropical Songs Artist of the Year, Duo or Group	Plan B
Tropical Songs Artist of the Year, Solo	Romeo Santos‡
Tropical Songs Artist of the Year, Solo	Marc Anthony
Tropical Songs Artist of the Year, Solo	Juan Luis Guerra
Tropical Songs Artist of the Year, Solo	Prince Royce
Tropical Albums Artist of the Year, Duo or Group	El Gran Combo de Puerto Rico‡
Tropical Albums Artist of the Year, Duo or Group	Grupo Niche
Tropical Albums Artist of the Year, Duo or Group	Pirulo y la Tribu
Tropical Albums Artist of the Year, Duo or Group	Don Perignon y La Orquesta Puertoriquena
Regional Mexican Songs Artist of the Year, Solo	Gerardo Ortíz‡
Regional Mexican Songs Artist of the Year, Solo	El Komander
Regional Mexican Songs Artist of the Year, Solo	Noel Torres
Regional Mexican Songs Artist of the Year, Solo	Remmy Valenzuela
Regional Mexican Songs Artist of the Year, Duo or Group	Banda Sinaloense MS de Sergio Lizarraga‡
Regional Mexican Songs Artist of the Year, Duo or Group	Banda Los Recoditos
Regional Mexican Songs Artist of the Year, Duo or Group	Julión Álvarez y su Norteño Banda
Regional Mexican Songs Artist of the Year, Duo or Group	Calibre 50
Regional Mexican Albums Artist of the Year, Solo	Jenni Rivera‡
Regional Mexican Albums Artist of the Year, Solo	Luis Coronel
Regional Mexican Albums Artist of the Year, Solo	Juan Gabriel
Regional Mexican Albums Artist of the Year, Solo	Roberto Tapia
Regional Mexican Albums Artist of the Year, Duo or Group	Julion Alvarez y su Norteño Banda‡
Regional Mexican Albums Artist of the Year, Duo or Group	Banda Sinaloense MS de Sergio Lizarraga
Regional Mexican Albums Artist of the Year, Duo or Group	Calibre 50
Regional Mexican Albums Artist of the Year, Duo or Group	Los Tigres del Norte
Latin Rhythm Songs Artist of the Year, Solo	J Balvin‡
Latin Rhythm Songs Artist of the Year, Solo	Don Omar
Latin Rhythm Songs Artist of the Year, Solo	Wisin
Latin Rhythm Songs Artist of the Year, Solo	Yandel
Latin Rhythm Songs Artist of the Year, Duo or Group	Plan B‡
Latin Rhythm Songs Artist of the Year, Duo or Group	Alexis & Fido
Latin Rhythm Songs Artist of the Year, Duo or Group	Baby Rasta & Gringo
Latin Rhythm Songs Artist of the Year, Duo or Group	Zion & Lennox
Latin Rhythm Albums Artist of the Year, Solo	Wisin‡
Latin Rhythm Albums Artist of the Year, Solo	J Balvin
Latin Rhythm Albums Artist of the Year, Solo	Farruko
Latin Rhythm Albums Artist of the Year, Solo	Yandel
Latin Rhythm Albums Artist of the Year, Duo or Group	Calle 13‡
Latin Rhythm Albums Artist of the Year, Duo or Group	Alexis & Fido
Latin Rhythm Albums Artist of the Year, Duo or Group	Cartel de Santa
Latin Rhythm Albums Artist of the Year, Duo or Group	Plan B

=== Singles ===
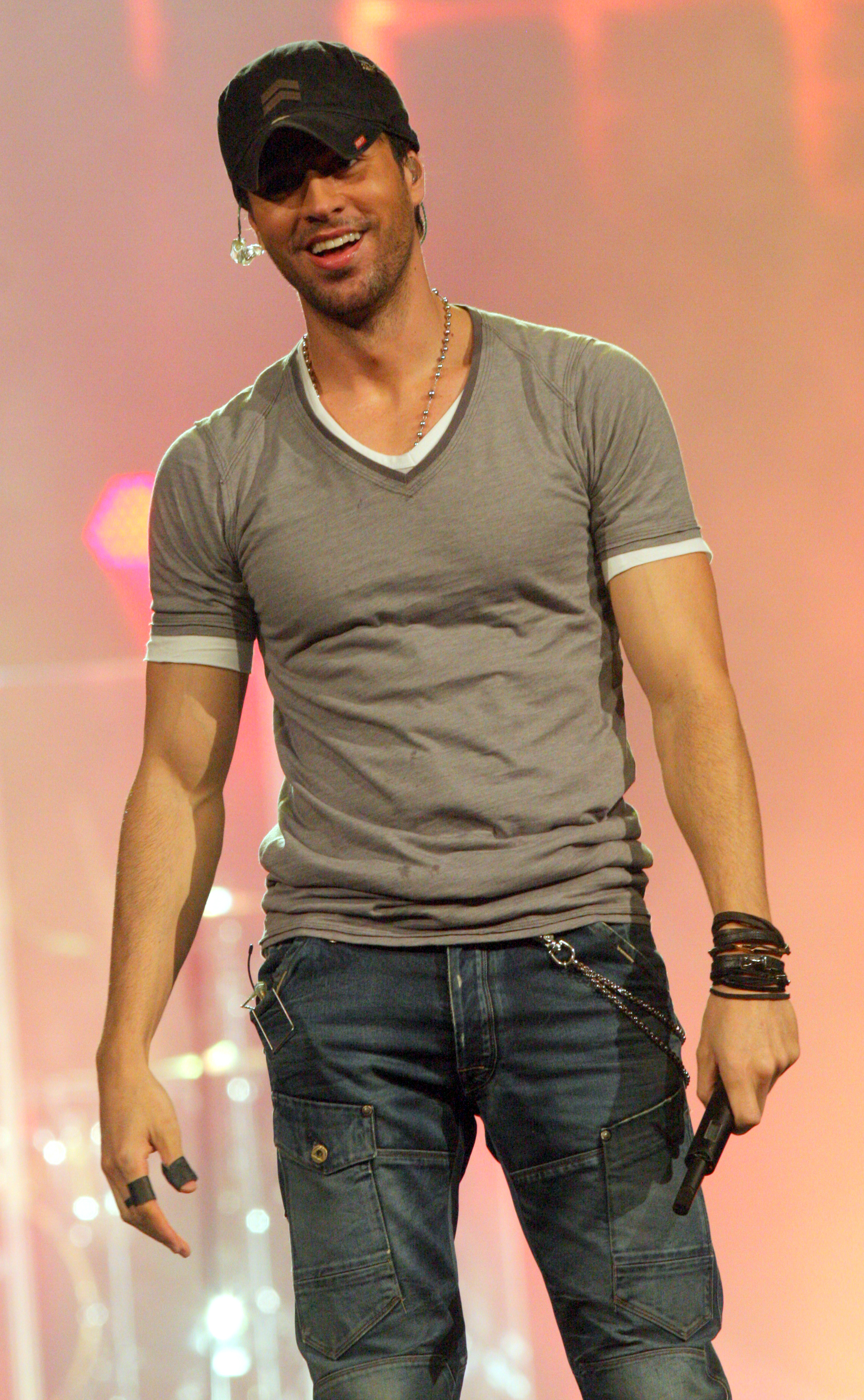
Spanish singer Enrique Iglesias (pictured in 2011), received 19 nominations for the Billboard Latin Music Awards, winning six awards for the song "Bailando".

Category	Recipient
Hot Latin Song of the Year	Enrique Iglesias featuring Descemer Bueno and Gente de Zona – "Bailando"‡
Hot Latin Song of the Year	J Balvin featuring Farruko – "6 AM"
Hot Latin Song of the Year	Romeo Santos – "Eres Mía"
Hot Latin Song of the Year	Romeo Santos featuring Drake – "Odio"
Hot Latin Song of the Year, Vocal Event	Enrique Iglesias featuring Descemer Bueno and Gente de Zona – "Bailando"‡
Hot Latin Song of the Year, Vocal Event	J Balvin featuring Farruko – "6 AM"
Hot Latin Song of the Year, Vocal Event	Enrique Iglesias featuring Marco Antonio Solís – "El Perdedor"
Hot Latin Song of the Year, Vocal Event	Romeo Santos featuring Drake – "Odio"
Airplay Song of the Year	Enrique Iglesias featuring Descemer Bueno and Gente de Zona – "Bailando"‡
Airplay Song of the Year	J Balvin featuring Farruko – "6 AM"
Airplay Song of the Year	Romeo Santos – "Eres Mía"
Airplay Song of the Year	Romeo Santos featuring Drake – "Odio"
Digital Song of the Year	Enrique Iglesias featuring Descemer Bueno and Gente de Zona – "Bailando"‡
Digital Song of the Year	J Balvin featuring Farruko – "6 AM"
Digital Song of the Year	Enrique Iglesias featuring Marco Antonio Solís – "El Perdedor"
Digital Song of the Year	Romeo Santos featuring Drake – "Odio"
Streaming Song of the Year	Enrique Iglesias featuring Descemer Bueno and Gente de Zona – "Bailando"‡
Streaming Song of the Year	Enrique Iglesias featuring Marco Antonio Solís – "El Perdedor"
Streaming Song of the Year	Romeo Santos – "Eres Mía"
Streaming Song of the Year	Romeo Santos featuring Drake – "Odio"
Latin Pop Song of the Year	Enrique Iglesias featuring Descemer Bueno and Gente de Zona – "Bailando"‡
Latin Pop Song of the Year	Camila – "Decidiste Dejarme"
Latin Pop Song of the Year	Chayanne – "Humanos a Marte"
Latin Pop Song of the Year	Enrique Iglesias featuring Marco Antonio Solís – "El Perdedor"
Tropical Song of the Year	Romeo Santos featuring Drake – "Odio"‡
Tropical Song of the Year	Marc Anthony – "Flor Palida"
Tropical Song of the Year	Romeo Santos – "Eres Mía"
Tropical Song of the Year	Romeo Santos featuring Marc Anthony – "Yo También"
Regional Mexican Song of the Year	Banda Sinaloense MS de Sergio Lizarraga – "Hermosa Experiencia"‡
Regional Mexican Song of the Year	Banda Sinaloense MS de Sergio Lizarraga – "No Me Pidas Perdón"
Regional Mexican Song of the Year	El Komander – "Soy de Rancho"
Regional Mexican Song of the Year	Julión Álvarez y su Norteño Banda – "Y Así Fué"
Latin Rhythm Song of the Year	J Balvin featuring Farruko – "6 AM"‡
Latin Rhythm Song of the Year	J Balvin – "Ay Vamos"
Latin Rhythm Song of the Year	Nicky Jam – "Travesuras"
Latin Rhythm Song of the Year	Wisin featuring Jennifer Lopez and Ricky Martin – "Adrenalina"

=== Albums ===
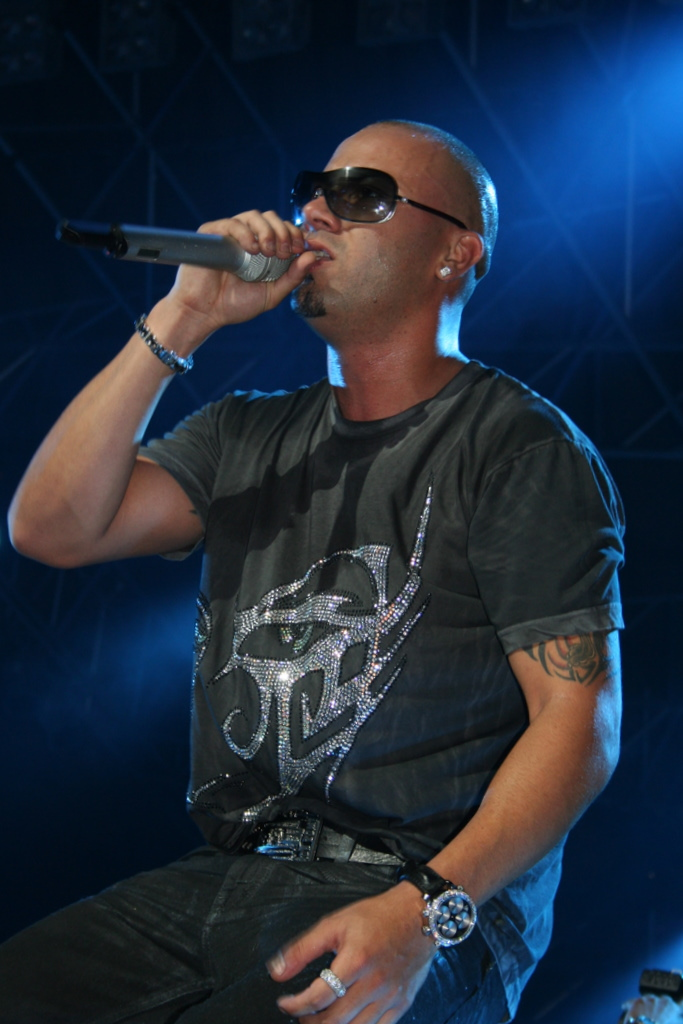
Puerto-Rican American artist Wisin (pictured in 2009), won Latin Rhythm Album of the Year for his album El Regreso del Sobreviviente.

Category	Recipient
Top Latin Album of the Year	Romeo Santos – Formula, Vol. 2‡
Top Latin Album of the Year	Enrique Iglesias – Sex and Love
Top Latin Album of the Year	Santana – Corazón
Top Latin Album of the Year	Various Artists – Las Bandas Románticas de América 2014
Latin Pop Album of the Year	Enrique Iglesias – Sex and Love‡
Latin Pop Album of the Year	Ricardo Arjona – Viaje
Latin Pop Album of the Year	Chayanne – En Todo Estaré
Latin Pop Album of the Year	Santana – Corazón
Tropical Album of the Year	Romeo Santos – Formula, Vol. 2‡
Tropical Album of the Year	Juan Luis Guerra – Todo Tiene Su Hora
Tropical Album of the Year	Various Artists – Que Lindo es Puerto Rico
Tropical Album of the Year	Various Artists – Sergio George Presents: Salsa Giants + Plus EP
Regional Mexican Album of the Year	Various Artists – Las Bandas Románticas de América 2014‡
Regional Mexican Album of the Year	Julión Álvarez y su Norteño Banda – Soy Lo Que Quiero: Indispensable
Regional Mexican Album of the Year	Juan Gabriel – Mis 40 en Bellas Artes
Regional Mexican Album of the Year	Jenni Rivera – 1969 - Siempre, En Vivo Desde Monterrey, Parte 2
Latin Rhythm Album of the Year	Wisin – El Regreso del Sobreviviente‡
Latin Rhythm Album of the Year	J Balvin – La Familia
Latin Rhythm Album of the Year	Calle 13 – Multi_Viral
Latin Rhythm Album of the Year	Plan B – Love and Sex

=== Record labels ===
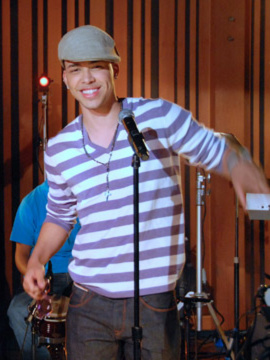
Puerto-Rican American artist Prince Royce (pictured in 2012), signed a record deal with Sony Music Latin in 2013.

Category	Recipient
Hot Latin Songs Label of the Year	Sony Music Latin‡
Hot Latin Songs Label of the Year	Discos Sabinas
Hot Latin Songs Label of the Year	Remex
Hot Latin Songs Label of the Year	Universal Music Latin Entertainment
Hot Latin Songs Imprint of the Year	Sony Music Latin‡
Hot Latin Songs Imprint of the Year	Disa
Hot Latin Songs Imprint of the Year	Fonovisa
Hot Latin Songs Imprint of the Year	Universal Music Latino
Airplay Label of the Year	Universal Music Latin Entertainment‡
Airplay Label of the Year	RCA
Airplay Label of the Year	Remex
Airplay Label of the Year	Sony Music Latin
Airplay Imprint of the Year	Sony Music Latin‡
Airplay Imprint of the Year	Disa
Airplay Imprint of the Year	Fonovisa
Airplay Imprint of the Year	Universal Music Latino
Top Latin Albums Label of the Year	Universal Music Latin Entertainment‡
Top Latin Albums Label of the Year	Remex
Top Latin Albums Label of the Year	Sony Music Latin
Top Latin Albums Label of the Year	Warner Latina
Top Latin Albums Imprint of the Year	Sony Music Latin‡
Top Latin Albums Imprint of the Year	Fonovisa
Top Latin Albums Imprint of the Year	Republic
Top Latin Albums Imprint of the Year	Universal Music Latino
Latin Pop Airplay Label of the Year	Sony Music Latin‡
Latin Pop Airplay Label of the Year	RCA
Latin Pop Airplay Label of the Year	Universal Music Latin Entertainment
Latin Pop Airplay Label of the Year	Warner Latina
Latin Pop Airplay Imprint of the Year	Sony Music Latin‡
Latin Pop Airplay Imprint of the Year	Capitol Latin
Latin Pop Airplay Imprint of the Year	Universal Music Latino
Latin Pop Airplay Imprint of the Year	Warner Latina
Latin Pop Albums Label of the Year	Universal Music Latin Entertainment‡
Latin Pop Albums Label of the Year	Multimusic
Latin Pop Albums Label of the Year	Sony Music Latin
Latin Pop Albums Label of the Year	Warner Latina
Latin Pop Albums Imprint of the Year	Republic‡
Latin Pop Albums Imprint of the Year	RCA
Latin Pop Albums Imprint of the Year	Sony Music Latin
Latin Pop Albums Imprint of the Year	Universal Music Latino
Tropical Songs Airplay Label of the Year	Sony Music Latin‡
Tropical Songs Airplay Label of the Year	Siente
Tropical Songs Airplay Label of the Year	Universal Music Latin Entertainment
Tropical Songs Airplay Label of the Year	Venemusic
Tropical Songs Airplay Imprint of the Year	Sony Music Latin‡
Tropical Songs Airplay Imprint of the Year	Capitol Latin
Tropical Songs Airplay Imprint of the Year	Machete
Tropical Songs Airplay Imprint of the Year	Universal Music Latino
Tropical Albums Label of the Year	Sony Music Latin‡
Tropical Albums Label of the Year	Planet Records
Tropical Albums Label of the Year	Popular
Tropical Albums Label of the Year	Universal Music Latin Entertainment
Tropical Albums Imprint of the Year	Sony Music Latin‡
Tropical Albums Imprint of the Year	Capitol Latin
Tropical Albums Imprint of the Year	Top Stop
Tropical Albums Imprint of the Year	Universal Music Latino
Regional Mexican Airplay Label of the Year	Universal Music Latin Entertainment‡
Regional Mexican Airplay Label of the Year	Discos Sabinas
Regional Mexican Airplay Label of the Year	Remex
Regional Mexican Airplay Label of the Year	Sony Music Latin
Regional Mexican Airplay Imprint of the Year	Disa‡
Regional Mexican Airplay Imprint of the Year	DEL
Regional Mexican Airplay Imprint of the Year	Fonovisa
Regional Mexican Airplay Imprint of the Year	Remex
Regional Mexican Albums Label of the Year	Universal Music Latin Entertainment‡
Regional Mexican Albums Label of the Year	Freddie
Regional Mexican Albums Label of the Year	Remex
Regional Mexican Albums Label of the Year	Sony Music Latin
Regional Mexican Albums Imprint of the Year	Fonovisa‡
Regional Mexican Albums Imprint of the Year	DEL
Regional Mexican Albums Imprint of the Year	Disa
Regional Mexican Albums Imprint of the Year	Remex
Latin Rhythm Airplay Label of the Year	Sony Music Latin‡
Latin Rhythm Airplay Label of the Year	Pina
Latin Rhythm Airplay Label of the Year	Siente
Latin Rhythm Airplay Label of the Year	Universal Music Latin Entertainment
Latin Rhythm Airplay Imprint of the Year	Sony Music Latin‡
Latin Rhythm Airplay Imprint of the Year	Capitol Latin
Latin Rhythm Airplay Imprint of the Year	Machete
Latin Rhythm Airplay Imprint of the Year	Pina
Latin Rhythm Albums Label of the Year	Sony Music Latin‡
Latin Rhythm Albums Label of the Year	Nacional
Latin Rhythm Albums Label of the Year	Universal Music Latin Entertainment
Latin Rhythm Albums Label of the Year	Warner Latina
Latin Rhythm Albums Imprint of the Year	Sony Music Latin‡
Latin Rhythm Albums Imprint of the Year	Capitol Latin
Latin Rhythm Albums Imprint of the Year	El Abismo
Latin Rhythm Albums Imprint of the Year	Pina

=== Writers, producers and publishers ===
Category	Recipient
Songwriter of the Year	Romeo Santos (Anthony "Romeo" Santos)‡
Songwriter of the Year	J Balvin (Jose Alvaro Osorio Balvin)
Songwriter of the Year	Luciano Luna Díaz
Songwriter of the Year	Horacio Palencia
Publisher of the Year	Mayimba Music, Inc, ASCAP‡
Publisher of the Year	Palabras de Romeo, ASCAP
Publisher of the Year	Sony/ATV Discos Music Publishing LLC, ASCAP
Publisher of the Year	Universal Music Latina, SESAC

=== Billboard Lifetime Achievement Award ===
- Roberto Carlos

=== Billboard Spirit Of Hope Award ===
- Carlos Santana

== Ceremony ==
The American telecast on Telemundo drew in an average 6.4 million people during its three hours of length, with the network ranking first in the ratings in the 18–34 demographic in New York, Miami, Houston and Phoenix, regardless of language. The telecast included musical performances by several artist including the opening number by American singer Marc Anthony and Gente De Zona with the track "La Gozadera"; American singer Jennifer Lopez sang a tribute medley to the Tejano artist Selena, featuring the brother, sister and husband (A.B. Quintanilla, Suzette Quintanilla, Chris Perez, respectively) of the latter. Dutch act Afrojack and American artist Ne-Yo joined Puerto Rican singer-songwriter Luis Fonsi, while Brazilian artist Roberto Carlos also performed. Reggaeton performer Wisin along Carlos Vives and Daddy Yankee gathered on stage to sing "Nota de Amor"; Mexican-American artist Carlos Santana was joined by Puerto-Rican singer Juanes to perform "Black Magic Woman" and "La Flaca".
