= List of number-one Billboard Latin Pop Airplay songs of 2014 =

The Billboard Latin Pop Airplay is a chart that ranks the best-performing Spanish-language Pop music singles of the United States. Published by Billboard magazine, the data are compiled by Nielsen SoundScan based collectively on each single's weekly airplay.

== Chart history ==
Issue date	Song	Artist	Ref
January 4	"Que Viva La Vida"	Wisin	
January 11	"Que Viva La Vida"	Wisin	
January 18	"Darte un Beso"	Prince Royce	
January 25	"Darte un Beso"	Prince Royce	
February 1	"Darte un Beso"	Prince Royce	
February 8	"Propuesta Indecente"	Romeo Santos	
February 15	"Hasta Abajo"	Yandel	
February 22	"Hasta Abajo"	Yandel	
March 1	"El Perdedor"	"Enrique Iglesias featuring Marco Antonio Solís	
March 8	"El Perdedor"	"Enrique Iglesias featuring Marco Antonio Solís	
March 15	"El Perdedor"	"Enrique Iglesias featuring Marco Antonio Solís	
March 22	"El Perdedor"	"Enrique Iglesias featuring Marco Antonio Solís	
March 29	"El Perdedor"	"Enrique Iglesias featuring Marco Antonio Solís	
April 5	"El Perdedor"	"Enrique Iglesias featuring Marco Antonio Solís	
April 12	"El Perdedor"	"Enrique Iglesias featuring Marco Antonio Solís	
April 19	"Odio"	"Romeo Santos featuring Drake	
April 26	"Odio"	"Romeo Santos featuring Drake	
May 3	"Odio"	"Romeo Santos featuring Drake	
May 10	"Odio"	"Romeo Santos featuring Drake	
May 17	"Odio"	"Romeo Santos featuring Drake	
May 24	"Odio"	"Romeo Santos featuring Drake	
May 31	"Odio"	"Romeo Santos featuring Drake	
June 7	"Bailando"	Enrique Iglesias featuring Descemer Bueno & Gente De Zona	
June 14	"Bailando"	Enrique Iglesias featuring Descemer Bueno & Gente De Zona	
June 21	"Bailando"	Enrique Iglesias featuring Descemer Bueno & Gente De Zona	
June 28	"Bailando"	Enrique Iglesias featuring Descemer Bueno & Gente De Zona	
June 5	"Bailando"	Enrique Iglesias featuring Descemer Bueno & Gente De Zona	
June 12	"Bailando"	Enrique Iglesias featuring Descemer Bueno & Gente De Zona	
June 19	"Bailando"	Enrique Iglesias featuring Descemer Bueno & Gente De Zona	
June 26	"Bailando"	Enrique Iglesias featuring Descemer Bueno & Gente De Zona	
August 2	"Bailando"	Enrique Iglesias featuring Descemer Bueno & Gente De Zona	
August 9	"Bailando"	Enrique Iglesias featuring Descemer Bueno & Gente De Zona	
August 16	"Bailando"	Enrique Iglesias featuring Descemer Bueno & Gente De Zona	
August 23	"Bailando"	Enrique Iglesias featuring Descemer Bueno & Gente De Zona	
August 30	"Bailando"	Enrique Iglesias featuring Descemer Bueno & Gente De Zona	
September 6	"Bailando"	Enrique Iglesias featuring Descemer Bueno & Gente De Zona	
September 13	"Bailando"	Enrique Iglesias featuring Descemer Bueno & Gente De Zona	
September 20	"Bailando"	Enrique Iglesias featuring Descemer Bueno & Gente De Zona	
September 27	"Bailando"	Enrique Iglesias featuring Descemer Bueno & Gente De Zona	
October 4	"Bailando"	Enrique Iglesias featuring Descemer Bueno & Gente De Zona	
October 11	"Bailando"	Enrique Iglesias featuring Descemer Bueno & Gente De Zona	
October 18	"Bailando"	Enrique Iglesias featuring Descemer Bueno & Gente De Zona	
October 25	"Bailando"	Enrique Iglesias featuring Descemer Bueno & Gente De Zona	
November 1	"Bailando"	Enrique Iglesias featuring Descemer Bueno & Gente De Zona	
November 8	"Bailando"	Enrique Iglesias featuring Descemer Bueno & Gente De Zona	
November 15	"Bailando"	Enrique Iglesias featuring Descemer Bueno & Gente De Zona	
November 22	"Tus Besos"	Juan Luis Guerra440	
November 29	"Tus Besos"	Juan Luis Guerra440	
December 6	"Tus Besos"	Juan Luis Guerra440	
December 13	"Tus Besos"	Juan Luis Guerra440	
December 20	"Tus Besos"	Juan Luis Guerra440	
December 27	"Tus Besos"	Juan Luis Guerra440	
