= Billboard Music Award for Top Latin Song =

Annual American music award

The Billboard Music Award for Top Latin Song winners and nominees. Notable winners include Bad Bunny, Enrique Iglesias, Shakira, Freshly Ground, Daddy Yankee, and Nicky Jam.

== Winners and nominees ==
Year	Song	Artist	Nominees
2000	A Puro Dolor	Son by Four	
2005	La Tortura	Shakira feat. Alejandro Sanz	Daddy Yankee-Lo Que Pasó, Pasó; Juanes-La Camisa Negra; Conjunto Primavera-Hoy Como Ayer
2011	Waka Waka (This Time for Africa)	Shakira & Freshly Ground	Shakira-Loca; Shakira-Gypsy (Shakira); Pitbull-Bon, Bon; Enrique Iglesias feat. Juan Luis Guerra-Cuando Me Enamoro
2012	Danza Kuduro	Don Omar feat. Lucenzo	Romeo Santos feat. Usher-Promise; Pitbull-Bon, Bon; Don Omar-Taboo; Prince Royce-Corazón sin cara
2013	Ai Se Eu Te Pego	Michel Teló	Juan Magan feat. Pitbull and El Cata-Bailando Por El Mundo; Don Omar feat. Natti Natasha-Dutty Love; Don Omar-Hasta Que Salga el Sol; Wisin y Yandel feat. Chris Brown and T-Pain-Algo Me Gusta de Ti
2014	Vivir Mi Vida	Marc Anthony	Daddy Yankee-Limbo; Loco; Enrique Iglesias feat. Romeo Santos-Loco; Prince Royce-Darte un Beso; Romeo Santos-Propuesta Indecente
2015	Bailando	Enrique Iglesias feat. Descemer Bueno and Gente de Zona	J Balvin feat. Farruko-6 AM; Romeo Santos-Eres Mía; Romeo Santos feat. Drake-Odio; Romeo Santos-Propuesta Indecente
2016	El Perdón	Nicky Jam and Enrique Iglesias	J Balvin-Ginza; Ariel Camacho and Los Plebes del Rancho-Te Metiste; Maluma-Borro Cassette; Romeo Santos-Propuesta Indecente
2017	Hasta El Amanecer	Nicky Jam	"Shaky Shaky" - Daddy Yankee; "Duele El Corazon" - Enrique Iglesias Feat. Wisin; "Chantaje" - Shakira Feat. Maluma; "La Bicicleta" - Carlos Vives & Shakira
2018	Despacito	Luis Fonsi and Daddy Yankee featuring Justin Bieber	"Mi Gente" - J Balvin and Willy William featuring Beyonce; "Mayores" - Becky G featuring Bad Bunny; "Felices Los 4" - Maluma; "Escapate Conmigo" - Wisin featuring Ozuna
2019	Te Boté	Casper Magico, Nio Garcia, Darell, Nicky Jam, Bad Bunny and Ozuna	"Mia" - Bad Bunny featuring Drake; "Dura" - Daddy Yankee; "Taki Taki" - DJ Snake featuring Selena Gomez, Ozuna and Cardi B; "X" - Nicky Jam and Bad Bunny
2020	Con Calma	Daddy Yankee featuring Snow	"China" - Anuel AA, Daddy Yankee, Karol G, Ozuna and J Balvin; "Callaíta" - Bad Bunny and Tainy; "No Me Conoce" - Jhay Cortez, J Balvin and Bad Bunny; "Otro Trago" - Sech featuring Darell, Nicky Jam, Ozuna and Anuel AA
2021	Dákiti	Bad Bunny and Jhay Cortez	"Yo Perreo Sola" - Bad Bunny; "Ritmo (Bad Boys for Life)" - Black Eyed Peas and J Balvin; "Hawái" - Maluma and The Weeknd; "Caramelo" - Ozuna, Karol G and Myke Towers
2022	Telepatía	Kali Uchis	"Todo de Ti" - Rauw Alejandro; "Volví" - Aventura and Bad Bunny; "Yonaguni" - Bad Bunny; "Pepas" - Farruko
2023	Ella Baila Sola	Eslabon Armado and Peso Pluma	"Bebe Dame" - Fuerza Regida and Grupo Frontera; "Un x100to" - Grupo Frontera and Bad Bunny; "TQG" - Karol G and Shakira; "La Bebé" - Yng Lvcas and Peso Pluma
2024	Gata Only	FloyyMenor and Cris MJ	"Monaco" - Bad Bunny; "Perro Negro" - Bad Bunny and Feid; "Qlona" - Karol G and Peso Pluma; "La Diabla" - Xavi

== See also ==
- Billboard Latin Music Award for Hot Latin Song of the Year
