= List of Billboard Hot Latin Songs and Latin Airplay number ones of 2014 =

The Billboard Hot Latin Songs and Latin Airplay are charts that rank the best-performing Latin songs in the United States and are both published weekly by Billboard magazine. The Hot Latin Songs ranks the best-performing Spanish-language songs in the country based digital downloads, streaming, and airplay from all radio stations. The Latin Airplay chart ranks the most-played songs on Spanish-language radio stations in the United States.

== Chart history ==
Chart history
Issue date	Hot Latin Songs			Latin Airplay		
Issue date	Title	Artist(s)	Ref.	Title	Artist(s)	Ref.
January 4	"Darte un Beso"	Prince Royce		"Loco"	Enrique Iglesias featuring Romeo Santos	
January 11	"Darte un Beso"	Prince Royce		"Loco"	Enrique Iglesias featuring Romeo Santos	
January 18	"Vivir Mi Vida"	Marc Anthony		"Put It in a Kiss"	Katherine Alexander	
January 25	"Darte un Beso"	Prince Royce		"Put It in a Kiss"	Katherine Alexander	
February 1	"Propuesta Indecente"	Romeo Santos		"Put It in a Kiss"	Katherine Alexander	
February 8	"El Perdedor"	Enrique Iglesias featuring Marco Antonio Solís		"La Nueva y La Ex"	Daddy Yankee	
February 15	"Odio"	Romeo Santos featuring Drake		"Odio"	Romeo Santos featuring Drake	
February 22	"Odio"	Romeo Santos featuring Drake		"Hasta Abajo"	Yandel	
March 1	"Odio"	Romeo Santos featuring Drake		"Odio"	Romeo Santos featuring Drake	
March 8	"Odio"	Romeo Santos featuring Drake		"Odio"	Romeo Santos featuring Drake	
March 15	"Odio"	Romeo Santos featuring Drake		"La Luz"	Juanes	
March 22	"Odio"	Romeo Santos featuring Drake		"El Mar de Sus Ojos"	Carlos Vives featuring ChocQuibTown	
March 29	"Odio"	Romeo Santos featuring Drake		"Adrenalina"	Wisin featuring Jennifer Lopez and Ricky Martin	
April 5	"Odio"	Romeo Santos featuring Drake		"El Perdedor"	Enrique Iglesias featuring Marco Antonio Solís	
April 12	"Odio"	Romeo Santos featuring Drake		"Te Robaré"	Prince Royce	
April 19	"Odio"	Romeo Santos featuring Drake		"Odio"	Romeo Santos featuring Drake	
April 26	"Odio"	Romeo Santos featuring Drake		"Odio"	Romeo Santos featuring Drake	
May 3	"Odio"	Romeo Santos featuring Drake		"Odio"	Romeo Santos featuring Drake	
May 10	"Odio"	Romeo Santos featuring Drake		"Odio"	Romeo Santos featuring Drake	
May 17	"Bailando"	Enrique Iglesias featuring Descemer Bueno and Gente de Zona		"Apnea"	Ricardo Arjona	
May 24	"Bailando"	Enrique Iglesias featuring Descemer Bueno and Gente de Zona		"6 AM"	J Balvin featuring Farruko	
May 31	"Bailando"	Enrique Iglesias featuring Descemer Bueno and Gente de Zona		"Bailando"	Enrique Iglesias featuring Descemer Bueno and Gente de Zona	
June 7	"Bailando"	Enrique Iglesias featuring Descemer Bueno and Gente de Zona		"Bailando"	Enrique Iglesias featuring Descemer Bueno and Gente de Zona	
June 14	"Bailando"	Enrique Iglesias featuring Descemer Bueno and Gente de Zona		"Bailando"	Enrique Iglesias featuring Descemer Bueno and Gente de Zona	
June 21	"Bailando"	Enrique Iglesias featuring Descemer Bueno and Gente de Zona		"Bailando"	Enrique Iglesias featuring Descemer Bueno and Gente de Zona	
June 28	"Bailando"	Enrique Iglesias featuring Descemer Bueno and Gente de Zona		"Bailando"	Enrique Iglesias featuring Descemer Bueno and Gente de Zona	
July 5	"Bailando"	Enrique Iglesias featuring Descemer Bueno and Gente de Zona		"Bailando"	Enrique Iglesias featuring Descemer Bueno and Gente de Zona	
July 12	"Bailando"	Enrique Iglesias featuring Descemer Bueno and Gente de Zona		"Bailando"	Enrique Iglesias featuring Descemer Bueno and Gente de Zona	
July 19	"Bailando"	Enrique Iglesias featuring Descemer Bueno and Gente de Zona		"Bailando"	Enrique Iglesias featuring Descemer Bueno and Gente de Zona	
July 26	"Bailando"	Enrique Iglesias featuring Descemer Bueno and Gente de Zona		"Bailando"	Enrique Iglesias featuring Descemer Bueno and Gente de Zona	
August 2	"Bailando"	Enrique Iglesias featuring Descemer Bueno and Gente de Zona		"Bailando"	Enrique Iglesias featuring Descemer Bueno and Gente de Zona	
August 9	"Bailando"	Enrique Iglesias featuring Descemer Bueno and Gente de Zona		"Bailando"	Enrique Iglesias featuring Descemer Bueno and Gente de Zona	
August 16	"Bailando"	Enrique Iglesias featuring Descemer Bueno and Gente de Zona		"Bailando"	Enrique Iglesias featuring Descemer Bueno and Gente de Zona	
August 23	"Bailando"	Enrique Iglesias featuring Descemer Bueno and Gente de Zona		"Bailando"	Enrique Iglesias featuring Descemer Bueno and Gente de Zona	
August 30	"Bailando"	Enrique Iglesias featuring Descemer Bueno and Gente de Zona		"Bailando"	Enrique Iglesias featuring Descemer Bueno and Gente de Zona	
September 6	"Bailando"	Enrique Iglesias featuring Descemer Bueno and Gente de Zona		"Bailando"	Enrique Iglesias featuring Descemer Bueno and Gente de Zona	
September 13	"Bailando"	Enrique Iglesias featuring Descemer Bueno and Gente de Zona		"Bailando"	Enrique Iglesias featuring Descemer Bueno and Gente de Zona	
September 20	"Bailando"	Enrique Iglesias featuring Descemer Bueno and Gente de Zona		"Bailando"	Enrique Iglesias featuring Descemer Bueno and Gente de Zona	
September 27	"Bailando"	Enrique Iglesias featuring Descemer Bueno and Gente de Zona		"Bailando"	Enrique Iglesias featuring Descemer Bueno and Gente de Zona	
October 4	"Bailando"	Enrique Iglesias featuring Descemer Bueno and Gente de Zona		"Bailando"	Enrique Iglesias featuring Descemer Bueno and Gente de Zona	
October 11	"Bailando"	Enrique Iglesias featuring Descemer Bueno and Gente de Zona		"Bailando"	Enrique Iglesias featuring Descemer Bueno and Gente de Zona	
October 18	"Bailando"	Enrique Iglesias featuring Descemer Bueno and Gente de Zona		"Eres Mía"	Romeo Santos	
October 25	"Bailando"	Enrique Iglesias featuring Descemer Bueno and Gente de Zona		"Cuando Nos Volvamos a Encontrar"	Carlos Vives featuring Marc Anthony	
November 1	"Bailando"	Enrique Iglesias featuring Descemer Bueno and Gente de Zona		"Tus Besos"	Juan Luis Guerra & 4.40	
November 8	"Bailando"	Enrique Iglesias featuring Descemer Bueno and Gente de Zona		"Tus Besos"	Juan Luis Guerra & 4.40	
November 15	"Bailando"	Enrique Iglesias featuring Descemer Bueno and Gente de Zona		"Tus Besos"	Juan Luis Guerra & 4.40	
November 22	"Bailando"	Enrique Iglesias featuring Descemer Bueno and Gente de Zona		"Tus Besos"	Juan Luis Guerra & 4.40	
November 29	"Bailando"	Enrique Iglesias featuring Descemer Bueno and Gente de Zona		"Tus Besos"	Juan Luis Guerra & 4.40	
December 6	"Bailando"	Enrique Iglesias featuring Descemer Bueno and Gente de Zona		"Tus Besos"	Juan Luis Guerra & 4.40	
December 13	"Bailando"	Enrique Iglesias featuring Descemer Bueno and Gente de Zona		"Tus Besos"	Juan Luis Guerra & 4.40	
December 20	"Bailando"	Enrique Iglesias featuring Descemer Bueno and Gente de Zona		"Ay Vamos"	J Balvin	
December 27	"Bailando"	Enrique Iglesias featuring Descemer Bueno and Gente de Zona		"Yo También"	Romeo Santos featuring Marc Anthony	
