= Nuestro Amor (disambiguation) =

Nuestro Amor (English: Our Love) is a 2005 album by RBD.

Nuestro Amor may also refer to:

- "Nuestro Amor" (RBD song), the title song from the album
- "Nuestro Amor" (Alex Bueno song), 2020

== See also ==
- "Nuestro Amor Será Leyenda" (English: Our Love Will Be Legend), 2010 song by Alejandro Sanz
- "Noche de Entierro (Nuestro Amor)" (English: Night to Bury (Our Love)), 2006 song by Daddy Yankee, Wisin & Yandel, Héctor el Father, Zion and Tony Tun Tun
