= Cancioncitas de Amor =

Single by Romeo Santos

from the album Formula, Vol. 2
- Released: February 11, 2014
- Recorded: 2013
- Genre: Bachata
- Length: 3:45
- Label: Sony Latin
- Songwriter: Romeo Santos

Romeo Santos singles chronology
"Odio" (2014)	"Cancioncitas de Amor" (2014)	"Eres Mía" (2014)

"Cancioncitas de Amor" (English: "Little Songs of Love") is a song written and performed by American singer Romeo Santos. It was released as the third single for his second studio album Formula, Vol. 2 on February 11, 2014.

== Charts and certifications ==
=== Weekly charts ===
Chart (2014)	Peak position
Colombia (National-Report)	3
Dominican Republic (Monitor Latino)	1
Spain (Promusicae)	27
US Hot Latin Songs (Billboard)	9
US Latin Airplay (Billboard)	39

=== Year-end charts ===
Chart (2014)	Position
US Latin Songs	20

=== Certifications ===
Region	Certification	Certified units/sales
Mexico (AMPROFON)	Diamond+Platinum+Gold	390,000^{‡}
Spain (Promusicae)	Platinum	60,000^{‡}
United States (RIAA)	3× Diamond (Latin)	1,800,000^{‡}
^{‡} Sales+streaming figures based on certification alone.
