= Flor Pálida =

2002 single by Polo Montañez

Song by Polo Montañez

from the album Guitarra Mía
- Language: Spanish
- Released: 2002
- Recorded: 2002
- Genre: Son cubano
- Length: 2:46
- Label: Instinct Records
- Songwriter: Polo Montañez

Flor Pálida ("Pale Flower") is a song written and performed by Cuban singer-songwriter Polo Montañez. It was recorded for his second and final studio album Guitarra Mía (2002). It is the tenth track on the album. On the review of the album, Newsreview.com editor Christine G.K. LaPado-Breglia praised the song as "so beautiful, with its plaintive violin and heart-stirring vocals".

== Marc Anthony version ==
"Flor Pálida"

Single by Marc Anthony

from the album 3.0
- Released: October 17, 2014
- Recorded: 2012
- Genre: Salsa
- Length: 4:35
- Label: Sony Music Latin
- Songwriter: Polo Montañez
- Producer: Sergio George

Marc Anthony singles chronology
"Cuando Nos Volvamos a Encontrar" (2014)	"Flor Pálida" (2014)	"Yo También" (2014)

In 2013, American recording artist Marc Anthony covered "Flor Pálida" on his album 3.0. Released as the third single from the album, Anthony's cover was arranged and produced by American musician Sergio George. Hector Aviles from Latino Music Cafe called Anthony's cover "a great tribute to Polo’s original version with his performance." New York Times editor Ben Ratliff referred "Flor Pálida" along with "Espera" and "Cautivo de Este Amor" as the "best of the kind". A.D. Amorosi of the Philadelphia Inquirer called the song "impresionante".

=== Charts ===
Chart (2014)	Peak position
US Latin Airplay (Billboard)	16
US Tropical Airplay (Billboard)	1

=== Year-end charts ===
Chart (2014)	Position
US Latin Airplay	45
US Latin Tropical Airplay	2
