= Hilito =

Promotional single by Romeo Santos

from the album Formula, Vol. 2
- Released: February 25, 2014 (album release)
- Recorded: 2013
- Genre: Bachata
- Length: 3:54
- Label: Sony Music
- Songwriter: Anthony "Romeo" Santos

"Hilito" (English: "Thread") is a song by American singer Romeo Santos from his second studio album Formula, Vol. 2 (2014).

== Chart performance ==
Chart (2014)	Peak position
US Hot Latin Songs (Billboard)	4
US Latin Airplay (Billboard)	1
US Latin Pop Airplay (Billboard)	2
US Tropical Airplay (Billboard)	2

== Certifications ==
Region	Certification	Certified units/sales
Mexico (AMPROFON)	Diamond+Gold	330,000^{‡}
United States (RIAA)	4× Platinum (Latin)	240,000^{‡}
^{‡} Sales+streaming figures based on certification alone.
