= Necio =

Promotional single by Romeo Santos featuring Carlos Santana

from the album Formula, Vol. 2
- Released: February 25, 2014 (album release)
- Recorded: 2013
- Genre: Bachata; rock; blues
- Length: 4:24
- Label: Sony Music
- Songwriter: Anthony "Romeo" Santos

"Necio" (English: "Foolish") is a song by American singer Romeo Santos, featuring Mexican guitarist Carlos Santana, from his second studio album Formula, Vol. 2 (2014).

== Chart performance ==
Chart (2014)	Peak position
US Hot Latin Songs (Billboard)	31
US Latin Airplay (Billboard)	18
US Latin Pop Airplay (Billboard)	6

== Certifications ==
Region	Certification	Certified units/sales
Mexico (AMPROFON)	Diamond+Platinum+Gold	390,000^{‡}
United States (RIAA)	3× Platinum (Latin)	180,000^{‡}
^{‡} Sales+streaming figures based on certification alone.
