= Yo También (song) =

2014 song by Romeo Santos featuring Marc Anthony

Single by Romeo Santos featuring Marc Anthony

from the album Formula, Vol. 2
- Released: November 10, 2014
- Recorded: 2013
- Genre: Salsa
- Length: 5:06
- Label: Sony Latin
- Songwriter: Romeo Santos

Romeo Santos singles chronology
"Eres Mía" (2014)	"Yo También" (2014)	"Masoquismo" (2015)

Marc Anthony singles chronology
"Flor Pálida" (2014)	"Yo También" (2014)	"La Gozadera" (2014)

Music video
- "Yo También" on YouTube

"Yo También" (English: "Me Too") is a song written and performed by Bachata singer Romeo Santos featuring Salsa singer Marc Anthony Released as the fifth single for his second studio album Formula, Vol. 2 (2014). The music video was released on January 23, 2015. It features Santos, an FBI agent who is going after Anthony, the loyal member of a mafia, fighting for the same girl (portrayed by Russian model Irina Shayk) they're in love with as they debate over either of whom made her happier. Dominican actor Manny Pérez also appears as Santos' superior.

== Charts ==
=== Weekly charts ===
Chart (2014)	Peak position
Mexico (Billboard Mexican Airplay)	21
Mexico (Billboard Popular Airplay)	6
US Bubbling Under Hot 100 (Billboard)	20
US Hot Latin Songs (Billboard)	4
US Latin Airplay (Billboard)	1
US Latin Pop Airplay (Billboard)	5
US Tropical Airplay (Billboard)	2

=== Year-end charts ===
Chart (2014)	Position
US Hot Latin Songs (Billboard)	54
Chart (2015)	Position
US Hot Latin Songs (Billboard)	26

=== Certifications ===
Region	Certification	Certified units/sales
Mexico (AMPROFON)	Diamond	300,000^{‡}
Spain (Promusicae)	Platinum	60,000^{‡}
United States (RIAA)	26× Platinum (Latin)	1,560,000^{‡}
^{‡} Sales+streaming figures based on certification alone.

== See also ==
- List of Billboard Hot Latin Songs and Latin Airplay number ones of 2014
