= Golden Tour (Romeo Santos) =

2018–19 concert tour by Romeo Santos

- Tour by Romeo Santos
- Associated album: Golden
- Start date: February 15, 2018
- End date: February 09, 2019
- Legs: 4
- No. of shows: 47 in North America; 11 in Latin America; 14 in Europe; 72 in total
- Attendance: 1,000,000+
- Box office: US $35 million+

Romeo Santos concert chronology
- Vol. 2 Tour (2014–2016); Golden Tour (2018–2019); Utopía Tour (2019)

Golden Tour was the third concert tour by American singer-songwriter Romeo Santos, to support his third studio album, Golden (2017). The tour kicked off on February 15, 2018, at Madison Square Garden in New York and ended on February 9, 2019, in San Juan, Puerto Rico. The tour received positive reviews from critics, who praised the production and the artist's charisma. Golden Tour was a box office success in Europe, North America, and Latin America, with a total attendance of more than one million fans. It was the highest-grossing concert tour of that year, making the singer the number-one selling Latin artist in the United States.

In some cities, due to high demand, more dates were added. The first leg in the United States was sold out entirely, and a second North American leg was announced. Concerts during the first North American leg were opened by Karen Rodriguez, Victoria La Mala, Mr. Paradise, and Dominican urban star Mozart La Para.

== Critical reception ==
The tour was praised by the media. Richy Rosario from Billboard went to the New York concert at Madison Square Garden and wrote that "[Romeo's] ability to keep viewers on the edge of their seats is overwhelmingly tangible, as his flawless vocals span for over two hours .... It's his prowess on stage and expert musicianship that have made him this generation's bachata legend." Suzette Fernandez attended the Miami concert and wrote "Santos delivered an awe-inspiring set in a nearly three-hour spectacle that included many surprises, kiss battles and a display of his sense of humor".

LatinTimes published an article titled "6 Reasons Why You Should Go To Bachata King's Concert" and said that "attending a Romeo concert is really an experience that you have to live. Not only because of the good Latin vibe that is felt in the environment, but also because of the lights and scenery, plus the opportunity to enjoy him singing completely live". Music Connection reviewed the concert at the Forum in Inglewood, and wrote that "the bachata superstar Romeo Santos mesmerized his loyal fans with many of his hits songs old and new".

== Tour dates ==
| Date | City | Country | Venue |
North America
| February 15, 2018 | New York City | United States | Madison Square Garden |
| February 16, 2018 | New York City | United States | Madison Square Garden |
| February 17, 2018 | New York City | United States | Madison Square Garden |
| February 28, 2018 | Chicago | United States | United Center |
| March 2, 2018 | Montreal | Canada | Bell Centre |
| March 3, 2018 | Montreal | Canada | Bell Centre |
| March 6, 2018 | Boston | United States | Agganis Arena |
| March 7, 2018 | Boston | United States | Agganis Arena |
| March 8, 2018 | Allentown | United States | PPL Center |
| March 10, 2018 | Fairfax | United States | EagleBank Arena |
| March 13, 2018 | Orlando | United States | Amway Center |
| March 15, 2018 | Miami | United States | American Airlines Arena |
| March 18, 2018 | Atlanta | United States | State Farm Arena |
| March 20, 2018 | Houston | United States | Toyota Center |
| March 21, 2018 | Dallas | United States | American Airlines Center |
| March 24, 2018 | El Paso | United States | Don Haskins Center |
| March 25, 2018 | San Antonio | United States | AT&T Center |
| March 27, 2018 | Denver | United States | Pepsi Center |
| March 29, 2018 | Phoenix | United States | Talking Stick Resort Arena |
| March 30, 2018 | Inglewood | United States | The Forum |
| March 31, 2018 | Inglewood | United States | The Forum |
| April 3, 2018 | San Diego | United States | Viejas Arena |
| April 6, 2018 | Oakland | United States | Oracle Arena |
Europe
| April 30, 2018 | Málaga | Spain | Auditorio Municipal |
| May 4, 2018 | Milan | Italy | Area |
| May 5, 2018 | Zürich | Switzerland | Swiss Arena |
| May 6, 2018 | Bagnoli | Italy | Arenile di Bagnoli |
| May 11, 2018 | Paris | France | Zénith Paris |
| May 12, 2018 | London | England | SSE Arena Wembley |
| May 16, 2018 | La Coruña | Spain | Coliseum da Coruña |
| May 17, 2018 | Barcelona | Spain | Palau Sant Jordi |
| May 18, 2018 | Valencia | Spain | Auditorio Marina Sur |
| May 19, 2018 | Madrid | Spain | WiZink Center |
| May 20, 2018 | Murcia | Spain | Recinto Ferial de La Fica |
| May 25, 2018 | Las Palmas | Spain | Estadio Gran Canaria |
| May 26, 2018 | Santa Cruz de Tenerife | Spain | Parque Maritimo Palmetum |
North America
| June 14, 2018 | Monterrey | Mexico | Arena Monterrey |
| June 15, 2018 | Zapopan | Mexico | Estadio Tres de Marzo |
| June 16, 2018 | Mexico City | Mexico | Foro Sol |
Europe
| July 31, 2018 | Marbella | Spain | Starlite Auditorio |
North America
| September 13, 2018 | West Valley City | United States | Maverik Center |
| September 15, 2018 | Las Vegas | United States | MGM Grand Garden Arena |
| September 18, 2018 | Anaheim | United States | Honda Center |
| September 19, 2018 | San Jose | United States | SAP Center |
| September 20, 2018 | Seattle | United States | CenturyLink Field |
| September 21, 2018 | Seattle | United States | CenturyLink Field |
| September 23, 2018 | Sacramento | United States | Golden 1 Center |
| September 27, 2018 | Kansas City | United States | Sprint Center |
| September 29, 2018 | Greensboro | United States | Greensboro Coliseum Complex |
| September 30, 2018 | Reading | United States | Santander Arena |
| October 4, 2018 | Newark | United States | Prudential Center |
| October 7, 2018 | Brooklyn | United States | Barclays Center |
| October 9, 2018 | Duluth | United States | Infinite Energy Arena |
| October 11, 2018 | Miami | United States | American Airlines Arena |
| October 12, 2018 | Tampa | United States | Amalie Arena |
| October 14, 2018 | Fairfax | United States | EagleBank Arena |
| October 16, 2018 | Rosemont | United States | Allstate Arena |
| October 19, 2018 | Laredo | United States | Sames Auto Arena |
| October 20, 2018 | Edinburg | United States | Bert Ogden Arena |
| October 21, 2018 | Dallas | United States | American Airlines Center |
Latin America
| November 18, 2018 | Santiago | Chile | Movistar Arena |
| November 19, 2018 | Santiago | Chile | Movistar Arena |
| November 20, 2018 | Santiago | Chile | Movistar Arena |
| November 21, 2018 | Santiago | Chile | Movistar Arena |
| November 22, 2018 | Buenos Aires | Argentina | Hipódromo Argentino de Palermo |
| November 24, 2018 | Buenos Aires | Argentina | Hipódromo Argentino de Palermo |
| November 27, 2018 | Asunción | Paraguay | Jockey Club |
| November 29, 2018 | Lima | Peru | Estadio Nacional |
| December 6, 2018 | Panama City | Panama | Estadio Rommel Fernández |
| December 8, 2018 | San José | Costa Rica | Estadio Nacional |
| December 15, 2018 | Santo Domingo | Dominican Republic | Estadio Olímpico Félix Sánchez |
| February 8, 2019 | San Juan | Puerto Rico | José Miguel Agrelot Coliseum |
| February 9, 2019 | San Juan | Puerto Rico | José Miguel Agrelot Coliseum |

=== Box-office data ===
| City | Country | Attendance | Box office |
|---|---|---|---|
| Montreal | Canada | 12,621 / 12,621 (100%) | $897,049 |
| Toronto | Canada | 11,745 / 11,745 (100%) | $877,432 |
| Houston | United States | 10,959 / 10,959 (100%) | $1,200,228 |
| New York | United States | 44,155 / 44,150 (100%) | $5,103,253 |
| Dallas | United States | 12,300 / 12,300 (100%) | $1,338,268 |
| Atlanta | United States | 12,339 / 12,339 (100%) | $926,324 |
| Okland | United States | 14,408 / 14,408 (100%) | $1,257,288 |
| Inglewood | United States | 28,833 / 28,833 (100%) | $3,423,081 |
| Chicago | United States | 15,743 / 16,058 (98%) | $1,443,491 |
| Miami | United States | 13,510 / 15,045 (90%) | $1,379,713 |
| Fairfax | United States | 8,342 / 8,668 (96%) | $983,302 |
| Orlando | United States | 11,083 / 12,052 (92%) | $962,512 |
| San Antonio | United States | 9,804 / 10,794 (91%) | $840,748 |
| Allentown | United States | 7,916 / 8,608 (92%) | $686,244 |
| Phoenix | United States | 7,970 / 9,114 (87%) | $683,644 |
| Denver | United States | 6,920 / 7,715 (90%) | $602,407 |
| El Paso | United States | 7,532 / 8,966 (84%) | $573,577 |
| Boston | United States | 6,199 / 6,491 (96%) | $571,629 |
| Brooklyn | United States | 10,737 / 10,737 (100%) | $1,481,921 |
| San Juan | Puerto Rico | 19,615 / 23,023 (85%) | $1,510,811 |
| Totals | | 272,725 / 284,626 (96%) | $26,742,922 |
