= Nuestro Amor (Alex Bueno song) =

2007 song by Alex Bueno

Song by Alex Bueno

from the album Queda Algo
- Released: May 1, 2007 (album release)
- Recorded: 2007
- Genre: Bachata
- Length: 3:56
- Label: J&N Records

"Nuestro Amor"

Single by Alex Bueno and Romeo Santos
- Language: Spanish
- English title: "Our Love"
- Released: July 22, 2020
- Genre: Bachata
- Length: 3:21
- Label: Sony Latin
- Songwriter: Romeo Santos

Romeo Santos singles chronology
"Sigues Con Él (Remix)" (2020)	"Nuestro Amor" (2020)	"Tú Vas A Tener Que Explicarme (Remix)" (2020)

"Nuestro Amor" ("Our Love") is a song by Dominican singer Alex Bueno. It is the seventh track for 2007 studio album Queda Algo.

== Duet version with Romeo Santos ==
On July 22, 2020, Bueno released a duet version with American singer Romeo Santos. Alex Bueno claimed that he and Santos recorded a song in 2017 for an album. At the time Santos had released his third studio album, Golden (2017). The song was most likely going to be part of Santos' fourth studio album, Utopia, due to the fact that it is a collaboration album with bachata artists, but the song didn't end up making it to the album. Eventually, the song was released as a single a year later.

== Charts ==
Chart performance for "Nuestro Amor" (Duet Version)
Chart (2020)	Peak position
Dominican Republic Bachata (Monitor Latino)	2
US Latin Digital Song Sales (Billboard)	6
US Latin Airplay (Billboard)	44
US Tropical Airplay (Billboard)	3
