= Formula, Vol. 2 =

Studio album by Romeo Santos
- Released: February 25, 2014
- Genres: Bachata; Latin pop; R&B
- Length: 64:36
- Languages: Spanish; English
- Label: Sony Latin
- Producer: Romeo Santos

Romeo Santos chronology
The King Stays King: Sold Out at Madison Square Garden (2012)	Formula, Vol. 2 (2014)	Golden (2017)

Singles from Fórmula, Vol. 2
- 1. "Propuesta Indecente" Released: July 30, 2013; 2. "Odio" Released: January 28, 2014; 3. "Cancioncitas de Amor" Released: February 11, 2014; 4. "Eres Mía" Released: June 26, 2014; 5. "Yo También" Released: November 10, 2014

Fórmula, Vol. 2 is the second studio album by American singer Romeo Santos, released on February 25, 2014, by Sony Music Latin. The album was pushed by the success of its first two anticipation singles, "Propuesta Indecente," and "Odio", featuring Drake, which combined spent seventeen non-consecutive weeks atop the Hot Latin Songs charts and have remained in the top 5 of the chart for 98 of its 100 weeks.

Right after its release, the album hit number one in different countries as well as fifth place in the U.S. The album features various guest appearances by Latin and pop artists such as Drake, Nicki Minaj, Marc Anthony, Tego Calderón among others. The album contains songs with themes of love and lust.

== Promotion and tour ==
To promote the album, Santos embarked on the Formula, Vol 2. Tour. The tour started at Arena Monterrey in Monterry on March 7, 2014, and ended at Hard Rock Cafe & Casino in Punta Cana, Santo Domingo Dominican Republic at August 27, 2016.

== Critical reception ==
Professional ratings
Review scores
Source	Rating
AllMusic	5/5 stars
Rolling Stone	3.5/5 stars
Billboard	favorable

Allmusic's reviewer Thom Jurek said that "Santos proved himself an up-and-comer on Vol. 1, but on Vol. 2 he not only delivers on the promise, but emerges as a fully formed innovator. His collaborations underscore his reputation as a pop star, but that's just a natural byproduct of his talent and artistry". Julianne Shepherd of Rolling Stone stated that the album proved that "The former ringleader of bachata stars Aventura isn't known as the king of the romantic Dominican ballad for nothing".

== Commercial performance ==
The album debuted at number 5 on the US Billboard 200, selling 85,000 copies in its first week, for the week ending March 2, 2014. 85,000 copies made it the fastest-selling Latin Album in six years. Since its release, the album has been certified 11× Platinum in the Latin category for shipping over 660,000 copies. However, it has only sold 245,000 copies in the United States as of January 2015 as tracked by Nielsen SoundScan. Also, the album was a commercial success across Latin America and Spain, being certified Platinum or higher in Mexico, Spain, Chile, Argentina and Venezuela.

In Mexico, Fórmula Vol. 2 was the 8th Best Selling Album of 2014. The album sold 1 million of copies worldwide.

== Singles ==
"Propuesta Indecente" is the first single from the album. It was released on July 30, 2013. The song mixes the sound of bachata and Argentine tango. The singer sings a seduction story about a one-night stand. The music video was released on September 9, 2013. It was shot in Buenos Aires, and stars the Mexican actress, Eiza Gonzalez. The video has received over 1.9 billion views on the video-sharing website YouTube as of November 2022. The song peaked at number 1 in multiple charts including on the Billboard Hot Latin Songs chart. The song was number 1 for four consecutive weeks and it stayed on the chart 125 weeks. It also peaked at 79 on the Billboard Hot 100.

"Odio" is the second single and features Canadian rapper Drake. The song was released on January 28, 2014. The song peaked at number 1 in multiple charts including the Billboard Hot Latin Songs chart in which the song stayed at number 1 for 13 consecutive weeks. It also peaked at 45 on the Billboard Hot 100.

"Cancioncitas de Amor" is the third single. It peaked number 1 on the Monitor Latino's Dominican Republic Top 20 chart.

"Eres Mía" is the fourth single. The song is about a woman marrying a man she does not love. The music video was released on Jul 16, 2014, and it was shot in New York City. The song peaked at number 1 on the Billboard Latin and Tropical Airplay charts.

"Yo También" is the fifth single features American singer Marc Anthony. The music video was released on January 23, 2015, and it was shot in Dominican Republic. The song peaked at number 1 on the Billboard Latin Airplay chart.

== Track listing ==
Credits adapted from AllMusic and Tidal. All tracks written by Anthony "Romeo" Santos, except where noted.

No.	Title	Writer(s)	Length
1.	"Intro, Vol. 2" (featuring Kevin Hart)		1:11
2.	"Inocente"		3:56
3.	"Necio" (featuring Carlos Santana)		4:24
4.	"Amigo"		3:51
5.	"Cancioncitas De Amor"		3:57
6.	"Eres Mía"		4:10
7.	"Odio" (featuring Drake)	Santos; Rico Love; Aubrey Graham; Karen Rodriguez; Earl Hood; Eric Goudy II; Dwayne Nesmith; Noah Shebib	3:44
8.	"Hilito"		3:54
9.	"Yo También" (featuring Marc Anthony)		5:06
10.	"Fui a Jamaica"		3:55
11.	"No Tiene La Culpa"		5:04
12.	"Animales" (featuring Nicki Minaj)	Donovan "Vendetta" Bennett; Onika Tanya Maraj; Sean Roberts; Santos	2:49
13.	"Propuesta Indecente"		3:55
14.	"Obra Maestra"		4:05
15.	"7 Días"		4:13
16.	"Si Yo Muero"		3:22
17.	"Outro"		2:20
Total length:			64:36

Deluxe edition bonus tracks
No.	Title	Writer(s)	Length
18.	"Trust" (featuring Tego Calderón)	Santos; Karen Rodriguez; Tegui Calderón Rosario; Bennett; Roberts	3:49
19.	"Mami"		1:13
Total length:			69:38

Google Play exclusive edition
No.	Title	Writer(s)	Length
18.	"Trust" (featuring Tego Calderón)	Santos; Karen Rodriguez; Tegui Calderón Rosario; Bennett; Roberts	3:49
19.	"Gone Forever" (Google Play Exclusive)	Santos; Karen Rodriguez	3:31
20.	"Mami"		1:13
Total length:			73:09

Notes

- All tracks, except "Intro", "Yo También" and "Outro", feature background vocals by Karen Rodríguez, David Escobar, Giselle Moya, Juan Carlos De León and Leonardo Rey
- "Intro" features spoken vocals by Diana Henríquez, Wilfredo Medina and DJ Clue?
- "Inocente" features vocals by Joaquín Díaz, Giselle Moya, Alex "Chichi" Cabas and Carlos Dalmasí
- "Cancioncitas de Amor" features vocals by Milady Fernández
- "Yo También" features background vocals by Juan Bautista Martínez, Josué Rosado and Henry Santiago
- "Outro" features spoken vocals by Ruth Santos and Johnny Marines

== Charts ==
=== Weekly charts ===
Chart (2014–2015)	Peak position
Argentine Albums (CAPIF)	1
Belgian Albums (Ultratop Flanders)	68
Belgian Albums (Ultratop Wallonia)	103
Chilean Albums (Punto Digital)	11
Dutch Albums (Album Top 100)	61
Italian Albums (FIMI)	40
Mexican Albums (AMPROFON)	1
Peruvian Albums (PhantomMusicStore)	2
Spanish Albums (Promusicae)	4
Swiss Albums (Schweizer Hitparade)	46
Uruguayan Albums (CUD)	2
US Billboard 200	5
US Top Latin Albums (Billboard)	1
US Tropical Albums (Billboard)	1
Venezuelan Albums (Recordland)	1

=== Year-end charts ===
Chart (2014)	Position
Mexican Albums (AMPROFON)	8
Spanish Albums (PROMUSICAE)	40
US Billboard 200	84
US Top Latin Albums (Billboard)	1
US Tropical Albums (Billboard)	1
Chart (2015)	Position
Spanish Albums (PROMUSICAE)	68
US Top Latin Albums (Billboard)	2
US Tropical Albums (Billboard)	1
Chart (2016)	Position
US Tropical Albums (Billboard)	17
Chart (2017)	Position
US Top Latin Albums (Billboard)	7
US Tropical Albums (Billboard)	2
Chart (2018)	Position
US Top Latin Albums (Billboard)	11
US Tropical Albums (Billboard)	3
Chart (2019)	Position
US Top Latin Albums (Billboard)	15
US Tropical Albums (Billboard)	3
Chart (2020)	Position
US Top Latin Albums (Billboard)	19
US Tropical Albums (Billboard)	2
Chart (2021)	Position
US Top Latin Albums (Billboard)	21
US Tropical Albums (Billboard)	2

== Certifications ==
Region	Certification	Certified units/sales
Argentina (CAPIF)	2× Platinum	80,000^{^}
Canada (Music Canada)	Gold	40,000^{‡}
Chile (IFPI)	Platinum	
Italy (FIMI)	Gold	25,000^{‡}
Mexico (AMPROFON)	Diamond+4× Platinum+Gold	570,000^{‡}
Spain (Promusicae)	Gold	20,000^{‡}
United States (RIAA)	43× Platinum (Latin)	2,580,000^{‡}
^{^} Shipments figures based on certification alone.^{‡} Sales+streaming figures based on certification alone.

== See also ==
- List of number-one albums of 2014 (Mexico)
- List of number-one Billboard Latin Albums from the 2010s
- List of number-one Billboard Tropical Albums from the 2010s
