= Eres Mía =

2014 single by Romeo Santos

Single by Romeo Santos

from the album Formula, Vol. 2
- Language: Spanish
- English title: "You Are Mine"
- Released: June 26, 2014
- Genre: Bachata
- Length: 4:10
- Label: Sony Latin
- Songwriter: Romeo Santos

Romeo Santos singles chronology
"Cancioncitas de Amor" (2014)	"Eres Mía" (2014)	"Yo También" (2014)

Music video
- "Eres Mía" on YouTube

"Eres Mía" ("You Are Mine") is a song performed and written by American singer Romeo Santos for his second studio album Formula, Vol. 2 (2014). Sony Music Latin released the song as the fourth single from Formula, Vol. 2.

== Charts ==
=== Weekly charts ===
Chart (2014)	Peak position
Colombia (National-Report)	4
Dominican Republic (Monitor Latino)	1
Mexico (Billboard Mexican Airplay)	7
Spain (Promusicae)	84
US Bubbling Under Hot 100 (Billboard)	3
US Hot Latin Songs (Billboard)	2
US Latin Airplay (Billboard)	1
US Latin Pop Airplay (Billboard)	2
US Tropical Airplay (Billboard)	1
Venezuela (Record Report)	8

=== Year-end charts ===
Chart (2014)	Position
US Hot Latin Songs (Billboard)	5
US Latin Pop Songs (Billboard)	5
US Tropical Airplay (Billboard)	3

=== Decade-end charts ===
Chart (2010–2019)	Position
US Hot Latin Songs (Billboard)	28

== Certifications ==
Region	Certification	Certified units/sales
Canada (Music Canada)	Platinum	80,000^{‡}
Italy (FIMI)	Gold	25,000^{‡}
Mexico (AMPROFON)	3× Diamond+Gold	930,000^{‡}
Spain (Promusicae)	3× Platinum	300,000^{‡}
United States (RIAA)	77× Platinum (Latin)	4,620,000^{‡}
^{‡} Sales+streaming figures based on certification alone.

== See also ==
- List of Billboard number-one Latin songs of 2014
