= Odio (song) =

2014 song by Romeo Santos featuring Drake

Single by Romeo Santos featuring Drake

from the album Formula, Vol. 2
- Released: January 28, 2014
- Recorded: 2013
- Genre: Bachata
- Length: 3:45
- Label: Sony Latin
- Songwriters: Anthony Santos; Aubrey Graham; Richard Butler; Karen Rodriguez; Earl Hood; Eric Goudy II; Dwayne Nesmith; Noah Shebib
- Producers: Romeo Santos; Rico Love

Romeo Santos singles chronology
"Loco" (2013)	"Odio" (2014)	"Cancioncitas de Amor" (2014)

Drake singles chronology
"Too Much" (2013)	"Odio" (2014)	"Who Do You Love?" (2014)

"Odio" (English: "Hate") is a song written and performed by American singer Romeo Santos featuring Canadian rapper Drake Released as the second single for his second studio album Formula, Vol. 2.

It jumped to the number one spot on the Hot Latin Songs chart and was the highest debut for a Spanish song on the Billboard Hot 100 chart at the time, where it peaked at number 45. Since its release it has spent thirteen consecutive weeks atop the Hot Latin Songs chart. Furthermore, it has sold 147,000 copies in the United States. "Odio" was certified Platinum in the Latin digital field by the RIAA signifying 60,000 digital downloads.

== Charts ==
=== Weekly charts ===
Chart (2014)	Peak position
Dominican Republic (Monitor Latino)	4
Spain (Promusicae)	24
US Billboard Hot 100	45
US Hot Latin Songs (Billboard)	1
US Latin Airplay (Billboard)	1
US Tropical Airplay (Billboard)	1

=== Year-end charts ===
Chart (2014)	Position
US Hot Latin Songs (Billboard)	3
Chart (2015)	Position
US Hot Latin Songs (Billboard)	64

=== Decade-end charts ===
Chart (2010–2019)	Position
US Hot Latin Songs (Billboard)	14

=== All-time charts ===
Chart (2021)	Position
US Hot Latin Songs (Billboard)	35

== Certifications ==
Region	Certification	Certified units/sales
Canada (Music Canada)	Gold	40,000^{‡}
Mexico (AMPROFON)	Diamond+3× Platinum	480,000^{‡}
United States (RIAA)	61× Platinum (Latin)	3,660,000^{‡}
^{‡} Sales+streaming figures based on certification alone.

== See also ==
- List of number-one Billboard Hot Latin Songs of 2014
