= Propuesta Indecente =

2013 single by Romeo Santos

Single by Romeo Santos

from the album Formula, Vol. 2
- Released: July 30, 2013
- Recorded: 2013
- Genre: Bachata; tango
- Length: 3:55
- Label: Sony Latin
- Songwriter: Romeo Santos

Romeo Santos singles chronology
"Frio Frio" (2013)	"Propuesta Indecente" (2013)	"Loco" (2013)

Music video
- "Propuesta Indecente" on YouTube

"Propuesta Indecente" ("Indecent Proposal") is a bachata song by American singer Romeo Santos, released on July 30, 2013 as the lead single from his second studio album Formula, Vol. 2. It became one of the best-performing songs in Latin music. The song mixes the sound of Dominican bachata and Argentinian tango.

== Composition ==
Written by Santos himself, "Propuesta Indecente" is a Dominican bachata song, with incorporations of Argentinian tango.

== Commercial performance ==
In January 2017, it was certified double-diamond in the Latin field by the Recording Industry Association of America for selling over 1.2 million units in the United States. It also became the first song to remain on the US Hot Latin Songs chart for over 100 weeks. As of 2021, "Propuesta Indecente" is the second best performing Latin song ever on the Billboard Hot Latin Songs chart following "Despacito".

== Music video ==
Its accompanying music video was released on September 9, 2013, which was filmed at the National Library of Argentina and Palacio San Miguel. Featuring Mexican entertainer Eiza González, it begins in a black-and-white scene, with Santos talking to a group of men at a party, eventually making eye contact at González. Throughout the video, surroundings start changing into colors, and both Santos and González begin dancing in the near end of the video and later run outside the palace to a red car, with González spilling a bottle of tequila in front of the palace and lighting the trace on fire before doing so. The video was directed by Joaquín Cambre and produced by Virgin Films.

The music video attained over 100 million views on social platform YouTube in only three months, before attaining over 1 billion views by July 2016, making it the second music video in Spanish and by a Latin artist to do so at the time, behind Enrique Iglesias' "Bailando". It has received over 2.1 billion views on YouTube as of September 2024.

== Accolades ==
Its music video earned the Lo Nuestro Award for Video of the Year at the 26th Lo Nuestro Awards, with the song itself eventually receiving the Lo Nuestro Award for Tropical Song of the Year the following year.

== Chart performance ==
=== Weekly charts ===
Weekly chart performance for "Propuesta Indecente"
Chart (2013)	Peak position
Colombia (National-Report)	2
Mexico Airplay (Billboard)	1
Mexico (Monitor Latino)	15
Spain (Promusicae)	13
US Billboard Hot 100	79
US Hot Latin Songs (Billboard)	1
US Latin Airplay (Billboard)	1
US Latin Pop Airplay (Billboard)	1
US Tropical Airplay (Billboard)	1
Venezuela (Record Report)	1

=== Year-end charts ===
Year-end chart performance for "Propuesta Indecente"
Chart (2013)	Position
US Hot Latin Songs (Billboard)	5
Chart (2014)	Position
Spain (PROMUSICAE)	28
US Hot Latin Songs (Billboard)	2
Chart (2015)	Position
Spain (PROMUSICAE)	65
US Hot Latin Songs (Billboard)	2
Chart (2016)	Position
US Hot Latin Songs (Billboard)	98

=== Decade-end charts ===
Decade-end chart performance for "Propuesta Indecente"
Chart (2010–2019)	Position
US Hot Latin Songs (Billboard)	2

=== All time charts ===
All-time chart performance for "Propuesta Indecente"
Chart (All time)	Position
US Tropical Songs (Billboard)	4

== Certifications ==
Certifications for "Propuesta Indecente"
Region	Certification	Certified units/sales
Brazil (Pro-Música Brasil)	Gold	30,000^{‡}
Canada (Music Canada)	2× Platinum	160,000^{‡}
Italy (FIMI)	Platinum	50,000^{‡}
Mexico (AMPROFON)	3× Diamond+2× Platinum+Gold	1,050,000^{‡}
Spain (Promusicae)	6× Platinum	600,000^{‡}
United States (RIAA)	86× Platinum (Latin)	5,160,000^{‡}
Streaming
Spain (Promusicae)	Platinum	8,000,000^{†}
^{‡} Sales+streaming figures based on certification alone.^{†} Streaming-only figures based on certification alone.

== See also ==
- List of number-one Billboard Hot Latin Songs of 2013
- List of most-viewed YouTube videos
