= Fanny Lu discography =

- Studio albums: 3
- Compilation albums: 1
- Singles: 18
- Music videos: 5

The discography of Colombian pop singer Fanny Lu consists of three studio albums, one compilation album and eighteen singles. Fanny Lu's debut album, Lágrimas Cálidas, released in August 2006. It peaked the number one in two countries, the album spawned three singles "No Te Pido Flores", "Y Si Te Digo" and "Te Arrepentirás". This album is characterized for the fusion of vallenato and tropical rhythms, becoming a tropipop album.

In December 2008 was released the second studio album Dos. The album debuted at #70 on Latin Albums chart in the US and was certified Gold in Mexico, were singles: "Tú No Eres Para Mi" reaching the number one on the US Latin charts and peak #6 on Bubbling Under Hot 100 being very strange for a Spanish song. The song is the most successful on her career. The next singles that follow were "Celos", "Corazón Perdido" and "Mar de Amor". More later in November 2011, Fanny Lu released her third studio album Felicidad y Perpetua, the first album being the executive producer, four singles had been released: "Fanfarrón", "Ni Loca", "Don Juan" and "La Mala". The three first reaching the number one in Venezuela. Recently after one year of has released her fourth studio album, decided with Universal Music Latino released a greatest hits album Voz y Éxitos. Fanny Lu has sold more than 3 million albums worldwide.

== Albums ==
=== Studio albums ===
List of studio albums, with selected details, chart positions, sales, and certifications
Title	Studio album details	Peak chart positions			Certifications
Title	Studio album details	MEX	US Latin	US Latin Pop	Certifications
Lágrimas Cálidas	Released: August 8, 2006; Label: Universal Music Latino; Format: CD, cassette, digital download	—	—	—	ASINCOL: Gold; APFV: Gold; IFPI EC: Gold
Dos	Released: December 8, 2008; Label: Universal Music Latino; Format: CD, digital download	14	70	14	ASINCOL: Gold; AMPROFON: Gold; APFV: Gold
Felicidad y Perpetua	Released: November 21, 2011; Label: Universal Music Latino; Format: CD, digital download	—	70	18	
"—" denotes releases that did not chart.

=== Compilation albums ===
List of albums, with selected details
Title	Album details
6 Super Hits	Released: November 17, 2009; Label: Universal Music Latino; Format: Digital download
Voz y Éxitos	Released: November 30, 2012; Label: Universal Music Latino; Format: CD, digital download

== Singles ==
=== As lead artist ===
List of singles as lead artist, with selected chart positions and certifications, showing year released and album name
Title	Year	Peak chart positions			Certifications	Album
Title	Year	MEX	US Latin	VEN	Certifications	Album
"No Te Pido Flores"	2005	—	16	—	AMPROFON: Gold	Lágrimas Cálidas
"Te Arrepentirás"	2006	—	—	—		Lágrimas Cálidas
"Y Si Te Digo"^{[A]}	2007	—	1	—		Lágrimas Cálidas
"Tú No Eres Para Mi"^{[B]}	2008	3	1	12		Dos
"Celos"	2009	—	21	—		Dos
"Corazón Perdido"	2009	—	—	—		Dos
"Mar de Amor"	2010	—	—	—		Dos
"Fanfarrón"	2011	35	24	1		Felicidad y Perpetua
"Ni Loca" (featuring Dalmata)	2011	44	—	1		Felicidad y Perpetua
"Don Juan" (featuring Chino & Nacho)	2012	—	—	1		Felicidad y Perpetua
"Mujeres"	2013	—	—	—		Non-album single
"Fuerte"	2014	—	—	—		Non-album single
"El Perfume"	2016	—	—	—		Non-album single
"Lo Que Dios Quiera" (featuring Gente de Zona)	2016	—	—	—		Non-album single
"Llorar Es Una Locura" (featuring Mola)	2016	—	—	—		Non-album single
"My Love" (featuring Pasabordo)	2018	—	—	—		Non-album single
"Romper el Hielo" (featuring Noriel)	2018	—	—	—		Non-album single
"Amor Verdadero" (with Andrés Cepeda)	2018	—	—	—		Non-album single
"—" denotes a title that was not released or did not chart in that territory

=== As featured artist ===
List of singles, with selected chart positions
Title	Year	Peak chart positions	Album
Title	Year	VEN	Album
"Somos Pasión" (with Artist for "Colombia es Pasión")	2006	—	Non-album single
"Dame Un Besito" (Tecupae featuring Fanny Lu)	2013	2	Suerte
"Te Amaré" (Chichí Peralta featuring Fanny Lu)	2014	—	Endorfina
"Un Paso Hacia La Paz" (with Artists for #SoyCapaz)	2014	—	Non-album single
"Quiero Reir" (Fuego featuring Fanny Lu)	2015	—	Non-album single
"—" denotes a title that did not chart, or was not released in that territory.

Notes

- A. "Y Si Te Digo" did not enter the Billboard Hot 100, but peaked at number 19 on the Bubbling Under Hot 100 Singles chart, which acts as a 25-song extension to the Hot 100.
- B. "Tú No Eres Para Mi" did not enter the Billboard Hot 100, but peaked at number 6 on the Bubbling Under Hot 100 Singles chart, which acts as a 25-song extension to the Hot 100.

== Music videos ==
List of music videos, showing year released and director
Title	Year	Director(s)
"No Te Pido Flores" (First version)	2005	Mauricio Pardo
"No Te Pido Flores" (International version)	2006	Mauricio Pardo
"Tú No Eres Para Mi"	2008	Simon Brand
"Celos"	2008	Simon Brand
"Fanfarrón"	2011	Simon Brand
"Ni Loca"	2012	Carlos Pérez
"Mujeres"	2014	Pablo Croce
