= Chino & Nacho discography =

- Studio albums: 5
- EPs: 1
- Compilation albums: 1
- Singles: 15

The discography of Venezuelan pop duo Chino & Nacho consists of four studio albums, one compilation album and fifteen singles.

== Albums ==
=== Studio albums ===
List of albums, with selected chart positions
Title	Album details	Peak chart positions				Certifications
Title	Album details	MEX	US	US Latin	US Latin Pop	Certifications
Época de Reyes	Released: July 10, 2008; Label: Machete Music; Format: Compact Disc, digital download	—	—	—	—	APFV: 2× Platinum
Mi Niña Bonita	Released: April 6, 2010; Label: Machete Music, Universal Music Latino; Format: CD, digital download	20	—	4	—	RIAA: Gold (Latin)
Supremo	Released: October 18, 2011; Label: Machete Music, Universal Music Latino; Format: CD, digital download	—	130	1	1	ASINCOL: Gold
Radio Universo	Released: June 23, 2015; Label: Machete Music, Universal Music Latino; Format: CD, digital download	—	—	10	4	
Chino & Nacho is Back	Released: July 23, 2021; Label: Universal Music Latino; Format: CD, digital download	—	—	—	—	
"—" denotes releases that did not chart.

== Extended plays ==
List of albums, with selected chart positions
Title	Album details	Peak chart positions
Title	Album details	US Latin
Supremo: Reloaded	Released: March 13, 2013; Label: Machete Music, Universal Music Latino; Format: CD, digital download	42
"—" denotes releases that did not chart.

== Singles ==
List of singles, with selected chart positions, showing year released and album name
Title	Year	Peak chart positions						Album	Certifications
Title	Year	VEN	ARG	COL	US Hot Latin Songs	US Tropical Songs	US Latin Pop Songs	Album	Certifications
"Vagabundo de Amor" (featuring Divino)	2007	1	—	—	—	—	—		Época de Reyes
"Dentro de Mí" (featuring Don Omar)	2008	2	—	—	—	—	—		Época de Reyes
"Me Mata, Me Mata"	2008	2	—	—	—	—	—		Época de Reyes
"Niña Bonita"^{[A]}	2009	1	—	—	1	1	3		Mi Niña Bonita
"Se Apagó La Llama"	2009	2	—	—	—	—	—		Mi Niña Bonita
"Lo Que No Sabes Tú" (featuring El Potro Álvarez & Baroni)	2009	5	—	—	—	—	—		Mi Niña Bonita
"Tu Angelito"	2010	3	—	—	10	14	6		Mi Niña Bonita
"El Poeta"	2011	1	—	—	8	4	8		Supremo
"Bebé Bonita" (featuring Jay Sean)	2012	3	—	—	1	1	7		Supremo
"Regalame Un Muack" (featuring El Potro Álvarez)	2012	3	—	—	27	1	20		Supremo
"Sin Tí"	2012	1	—	—	18	6	5		Supremo
"Chica Ideal"	2013	1	—	5	19	1	12		Radio Universo
"Tu Me Quemas" (featuring Gente D' Zona & Los Cadillac's)	2014	1	—	6	27	1	6		Radio Universo
"Me Voy Enamorando" (featuring Farruko)	2015	1	—	6	18	1	10	PROMUSICAE: 2× Platinum	Radio Universo
"Andas en Mi Cabeza" (featuring Daddy Yankee and remix featuring Don Omar and Wisin)	2016	1	11	1	6	2	3	PROMUSICAE: 4× Platinum; RIAA: 15× Platinum (Latin)	Non-album single
"Soy Tu Fan"	2017	—	—	—	—	—	—		La Fan telenovela soundtrack
"Raro"	2020	—	—	—	—	—	—		TBA
"—" denotes a title that was not released or did not chart in that territory

Notes

- A. "Niña Bonita" did not enter the Billboard Hot 100, but peaked at number 4 on the Bubbling Under Hot 100 Singles chart, which acts as a 25-song extension to the Hot 100.

=== As featured artist ===
List of singles, with selected chart positions, showing year released and album name
Title	Year	Peak chart positions				Album
Title	Year	VEN	US Latin	US Tropical	US Latin Pop	Album
"Soñando" (Djemba featuring Chino & Nacho)	2010	—	—	—	—	Non-album single
"Bla Bla Bla" (El Potro Álvarez featuring Chino & Nacho)	2010	2	36	1	33	Non-album single
"Dame Un Besito" (Fainal featuring Chino & Nacho)	2011	1	—	—	—	Súper Fainal
"La Vida Es Bella" (Ana Isabelle featuring Chino & Nacho)	2011	8	—	—	—	Non-album single
"Don Juan" (Fanny Lú featuring Chino & Nacho)	2012	1	—	4	—	Felicidad y Perpetua
"Se Que Esta Noche Sera" (Marilanne featuring Chino & Nacho)	2012	—	—	—	—	Non-album single
"Dime Si Tú" (Estephy featuring Chino & Nacho)	2013	1	—	—	—	Non-album single
"—" denotes a title that was not released or did not chart in that territory
