= Voz y Éxitos =

Greatest hits album by Fanny Lu
- Released: November 30, 2012
- Recorded: 2005–2012
- Label: Universal Music Latino

Fanny Lu chronology
Felicidad y Perpetua (2011)	Voz y Éxitos (2012)

Voz y Éxitos (Voice and Hits) is the first greatest hits album and the second in the United States of Colombian recording artist and actress Fanny Lu, released on November 30, 2012 by Universal Music Latino.

== Track listing ==
No.	Title	Writer(s)	Length
1.	"No Te Pido Flores"	José Gaviria	4:05
2.	"Tú No Eres Para Mi"	Fanny Lu, José Gaviria, Andrés Munera	3:29
3.	"Fanfarrón"	Fanny Lu, José Gaviria, Andrés Munera	3:31
4.	"Y Si Te Digo"	José Gaviria	4:33
5.	"Celos"	José Luis Perales	2:57
6.	"Ni Loca" (featuring Dalmata)	Wise Cruz, Fanny Lu, Andrés Munera	3:30
7.	"Te Arrepentirás"	José Gaviria	3:12
8.	"Corazón Perdido"	Fanny Lu, José Gaviria, Andrés Munera	3:13
9.	"Don Juan" (featuring Chino & Nacho)	Fanny Lu, Miguel Mendoza, Jesús Miranda, Andrés Munera	3:36
10.	"Cariñito"	José Gaviria	3:30
11.	"Lágrimas Cálidas"	José Gaviria	4:28
12.	"Un Minuto Más" (featuring Noel Schajris)	Fanny Lu, Noel Schajris	3:52
13.	"La Mala"	Wise Cruz, Fanny Lu, Andrés Munera	3:39
14.	"Y Si Te Digo (Merengue Version)" (featuring Eddy Herrera)	José Gaviria	4:06
