= List of number-one Billboard Hot Tropical Songs of 2007 =

The Billboard Tropical Songs is a chart that ranks the best-performing tropical songs of the United States. Published by Billboard magazine, the data are compiled by Nielsen Broadcast Data Systems based on each single's weekly airplay.

== Chart history ==
Issue date	Song	Artist	Ref
January 6	"Los infieles"	Aventura	
January 13	"Los infieles"	Aventura	
January 20	"Los infieles"	Aventura	
January 27	"Los infieles"	Aventura	
February 3	"Sola"	Héctor el Father	
February 10	"Pam Pam"	Wisin & Yandel	
February 17	"Shorty shorty"	Xtreme	
February 24	"Shorty shorty"	Xtreme	
March 3	"Shorty shorty"	Xtreme	
March 10	"Shorty shorty"	Xtreme	
March 17	"La llave de mi corazón"	Juan Luis Guerra y 440	
March 24	"La llave de mi corazón"	Juan Luis Guerra y 440	
March 31	"La llave de mi corazón"	Juan Luis Guerra y 440	
April 7	"La llave de mi corazón"	Juan Luis Guerra y 440	
April 14	"La llave de mi corazón"	Juan Luis Guerra y 440	
April 21	"La llave de mi corazón"	Juan Luis Guerra y 440	
April 28	"Pegao"	Wisin & Yandel Featuring Los Vaqueros	
May 5	"Nunca había llorado así"	Víctor Manuelle Duet With Don Omar	
May 12	"No Te Pido Flores"	Fanny Lu	
May 19	"Pegao"	Wisin & Yandel Featuring Los Vaqueros	
May 26	"Mi corazoncito"	Aventura	
June 2	"Dímelo"	Enrique Iglesias	
June 9	"Más que tu amigo"	Tito Nieves	
June 16	"Más que tu amigo"	Tito Nieves	
June 23	"La foto se me borró"	Elvis Crespo	
June 30	"Que me des tu cariño"	Juan Luis Guerra y 440	
July 7	"Que me des tu cariño"	Juan Luis Guerra y 440	
July 14	"Que me des tu cariño"	Juan Luis Guerra y 440	
July 21	"La foto se me borró"	Elvis Crespo	
July 28	"Que me des tu cariño"	Juan Luis Guerra y 440	
August 4	"No llores"	Gloria Estefan	
August 11	"Mi gente"	Marc Anthony	
August 18	"Mi gente"	Marc Anthony	
August 25	"Y Si Te Digo"	Fanny Lu	
September 1	"Mi gente"	Marc Anthony	
September 8	"Mi gente"	Marc Anthony	
September 15	"Mi gente"	Marc Anthony	
September 22	"No llores"	Gloria Estefan	
September 29	"No llores"	Gloria Estefan	
October 6	"Mi gente"	Marc Anthony	
October 13	"Mi corazoncito"	Aventura	
October 20	"La travesía"	Juan Luis Guerra y 440	
October 27	"La travesía"	Juan Luis Guerra y 440	
November 3	"La travesía"	Juan Luis Guerra y 440	
November 10	"La travesía"	Juan Luis Guerra y 440	
November 17	"Conteo regresivo"	Gilberto Santa Rosa	
November 24	"Conteo regresivo"	Gilberto Santa Rosa	
December 1	"Conteo regresivo"	Gilberto Santa Rosa	
December 8	"Conteo regresivo"	Gilberto Santa Rosa	
December 15	"Conteo regresivo"	Gilberto Santa Rosa	
December 22	"Conteo regresivo"	Gilberto Santa Rosa	
December 29	"Conteo regresivo"	Gilberto Santa Rosa	

== See also ==
- List of number-one Billboard Hot Tropical Songs of 2008
- List of number-one Billboard Hot Latin Songs of 2007
- List of number-one Billboard Hot Latin Pop Airplay of 2007
