= Mujeres (Fanny Lu song) =

Single by Fanny Lu
- Released: November 5, 2013
- Genre: Latin pop
- Length: 2:58
- Label: Universal Music Latino
- Songwriters: Fanny Lu; Andres Munera; Wise Cruz; Yoel Damas; Andres Parra

Fanny Lu singles chronology
"Don Juan" (2012)	"Mujeres" (2013)	"Te Amaré" (2014)

"Mujeres" (English: Women) is a song by the Colombian Latin pop singer Fanny Lu, released as the lead single from her upcoming album, on November 5, 2013. The song was written by the same Lu, Andrés Munera, Wise Cruz, Yoel Damas and Andrés Parra.

== Background ==
During the year 2012, Fanny Lu was the judge on the talent TV show La Voz Colombia and others reality shows in Latin America, she tried again to stay in the news, while her last album Felicidad y Perpetua (2011) didn't have the sales that are wanted. Then her label, Universal Music Latino decided to finish the album promotion with a third and final single "Don Juan" and release her first greatest hits album Voz y Éxitos (2012). In March 2013, Fanny posted in her Twitter account, pictures about she recording and singing in the studio, more later she confirmed the existence about a new single. Lu had been invited again for Caracol Television for the second season of La Voz Colombia in June, leveraging her participation, more later on November 5 released "Mujeres" on YouTube.

== Music and lyrics ==
"Mujeres" was written by Fanny, Andres Munera, Wise Cruz, Yoel Damas and Andres Parra, and co-produced by Cruz and Munera.

== Live performances ==
The first live performance was on November 30, 2013, Fanny was host in the competition Chica HTV 2013 on Medellín, along the Venezuelan duo Chino & Nacho, during the show she perform "Mujeres".

== Track listing ==
- Digital download
1. "Mujeres" - 2:58
- Digital download — Remix version
1. "Mujeres (feat. Joey Montana)" - 3:18

== Charts ==
Chart (2014)	Peak position
Dominican Republic Pop Chart (Monitor Latino)	8
