= Chyno Miranda =

Venezuelan singer (born 1984)

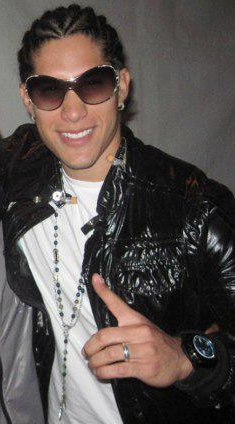
- Miranda in 2012

Background information
- Born: Jesús Alberto Miranda Pérez; 15 November 1984 (age 41); La Guaira, Venezuela
- Genres: Reggaeton; Latin pop
- Occupations: Singer; songwriter; actor
- Years active: 1998–present
- Website: ChynoMiranda.com

Jesús Alberto Miranda Pérez (born 15 November 1984, in La Guaira), better known as Chyno Miranda, just Chino, or El Chino, is a Venezuelan singer and is part of the musical duo Chino & Nacho, in collaboration with Miguel Ignacio Mendoza Donatti (known as Nacho).

== Career ==
=== Beginnings ===
He started his career performing in various formations and projects like Scala 1, Censura C and the Venevisión reality show Generación "S" and was a member of Calle Ciega.

=== 2007–2017; 2020–present: Chino & Nacho ===
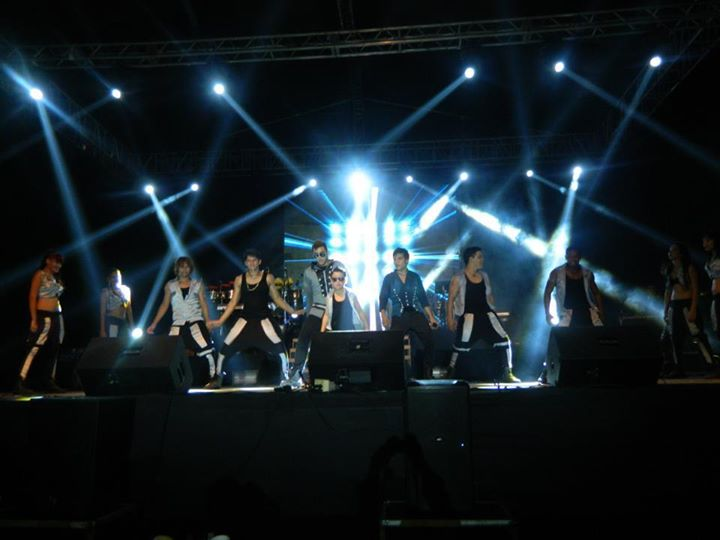
Chino & Nacho performing as a duo

He later on formed the duo Chino & Nacho gaining fame as a Latin artist. Notable songs by the duo included singles "Mi Niña Bonita", "Tu Angelito", "Lo Que No Sabés Tú", "El Poeta", "Regálame Un Muac", "Bebé Bonita", "Me Voy Enamorando" (Remix with Farruko) and "Andas En Mi Cabeza" (featuring Daddy Yankee). The duo's "Radio Universo Tour" included more than 80 concerts in many countries including a gig at Madison Square Garden and American Airlines Arena. In 2010, the group won a Latin Grammy for Best Urban Album for Mi Niña Bonita.

=== 2017–present: solo ===
In March 2017 Pablo Villalobos, the former manager of Chino y Nacho, reported the separation of the duo adding under a photo of Chyno: "Everything started here, everything ended here and here everything starts again". In his solo career, he announced a change of the spelling from Chino to Chyno Miranda as Chino with an "i" could have created legal problems and confusion with a Spanish band called Chino. In April 2017 Chyno Miranda launched his first solo single "Quédate conmigo" with the collaboration of Gente de Zona and Wisin. The single was released with its official video on June 16, 2017. He also made a remix of "Vamo' a la calle" with the Venezuelan upcoming artist Carlos Baute.

Chino played the role of singer Felipe Pirela in the film El malquerido and for which he was nominated for a Latin Grammy award for the soundtrack.

== Personal life ==
On August 26, 2017, he married the Venezuelan social media personality Natasha Araos. On July 24, 2021, rumors spread on social media that Miranda and his wife Natasha had divorced.

=== Health ===
Sometime in 2020, Miranda was infected with COVID-19 which eventually led to paralysis as a result of peripheral neuropathy. His health severely deteriorated and eventually led to encephalitis. Miranda underwent extended treatment at Centro de Rehabilitación (Rehabilitation Center) Tía Panchita in Caracas through 2022, but after improvement in his symptoms was able to return to tour in 2024.

== Discography ==
(For discography as part of Chino & Nacho, see Chino & Nacho discography)

=== Studio albums ===
- Cariño Mío (2019)

=== Singles ===
- 2017: "Quédate Conmigo" (feat. Wisin & Gente de Zona)
- 2017: "Tú me Elevas"
- 2017: "Hasta el Ombligo" (with Zion & Lennox)
- 2018: "Sin Trucos de Belleza" (with Neutro Shorty & Juhn)
- 2018: "Me Provoca"
- 2018: "El Peor" (with J Balvin)
- 2019: "Celosa" (with Farruko)
- 2019: "Cariño Mío" (with Mau y Ricky)
- 2019: "Dónde Nos Vamos a Ver" (solo or remix with Juan Magán and Magic Juan)
- 2020: "En El Asiento de Atrás"

Featured in

- «Bailar contigo» (With 3Ball MTY & El Jova)
- «Vamo' a la calle» (With Carlos Baute)
- «Como en Las Vegas» (With Olga Tañón)
- «Tu boquita» (With EstoeSPosdata)
- «Ando buscando» (With Agustín Casanova)
- «Roce» (With Tomas The Latin Boy)

== Filmography ==
- 2015: El malquerido as Felipe Pirela
