= Poeta =

Poeta (Italian, Polish, Portuguese and Spanish for poet) may refer to:

== Biology ==
- Poeta (moth)

== Music ==
- El poeta, a 1980 opera by Federico Moreno Torroba
- Poeta, a 1997 album by Vicente Amigo
- "El Poeta" (song), a 2011 song by Chino & Nacho

== People ==
- Giuseppe Poeta (born 1985), Italian basketball player
- Patrícia Poeta (born 1976), Brazilian newscaster and journalist
- Tony Poeta (1933–2004), Canadian ice hockey player
