= Simón Brand =

Colombian film director

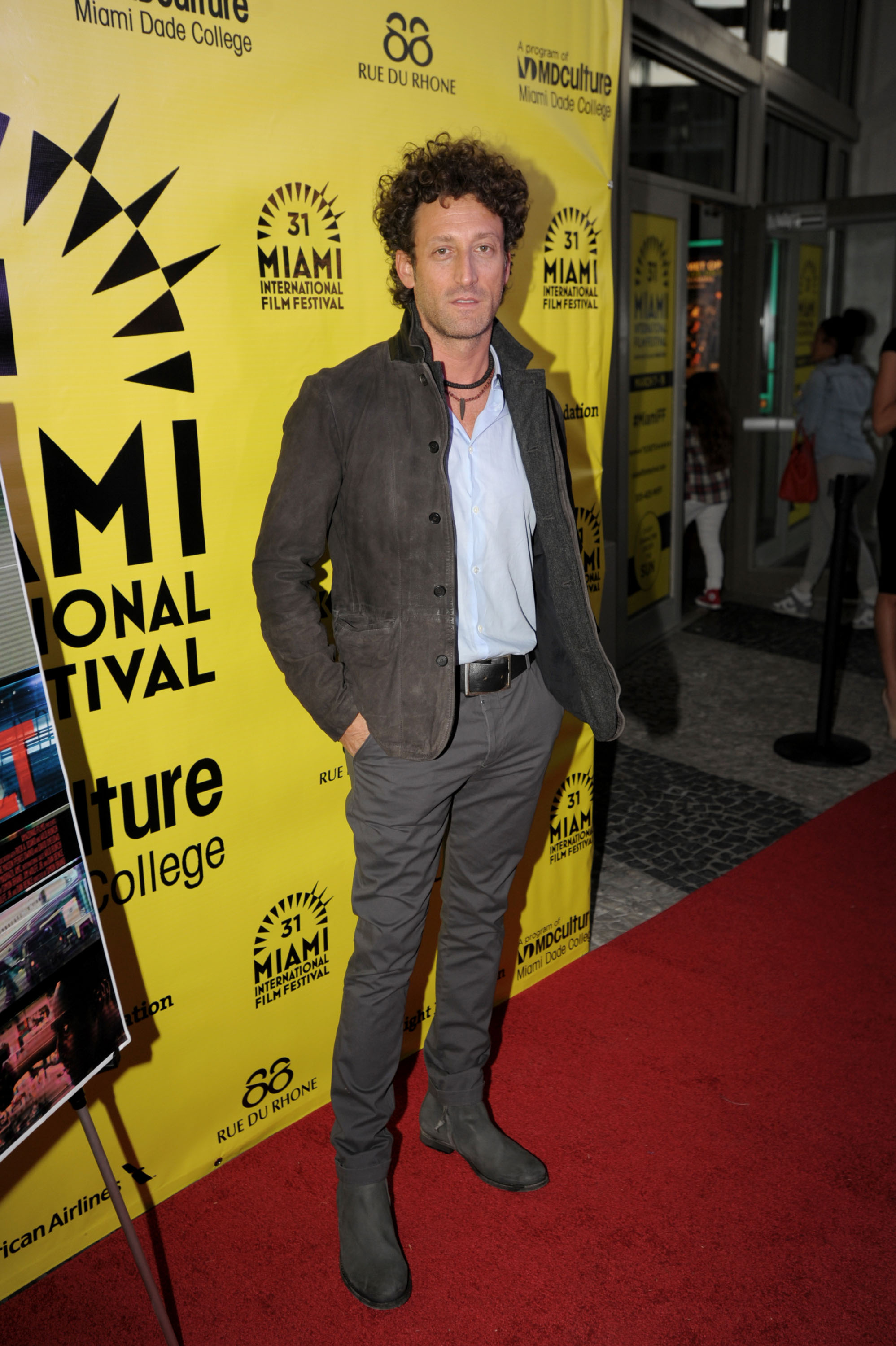
- Brand at the 2014 Miami International Film Festival
- Born: Simón Brand; July 28, 1970 (age 55); Cali, Colombia
- Occupations: Film director, film producer, music video director

Simón Brand (born July 28, 1970) is a Colombian film director. Brand has directed more than 200 TV commercials for companies such as Coca-Cola, Coors Light, AT&T, Apple Inc., BMW. He has also directed music videos for artists such as Paulina Rubio, Thalía, Juanes, Shakira, Alejandro Fernández, Enrique Iglesias and Ricky Martin.

In 2006, he made his debut as film director with the film Unknown. His next film Paraiso Travel had the highest attendance for a Colombian film in 2008 with 888,409 viewers. He currently resides in Los Angeles, California, with his wife Claudia Bahamón, a Colombian model and TV host, along with their two children.

== Career ==
Brand started his career at the age of sixteen, when he directed his first music video for the Colombian band Pasaporte, the song "Igor y Penélope". Two years later, he directed the music video "El Velo" for Colombian group Estados Alterados. Soon after, he moved to Miami thanks to a scholarship from Music and Video Academic. His first job in the United States consisted of recording voice-overs for phone companies. After graduating with honors, Brand founded his own production company called Kree8, with which he has produced most of his commercials and music videos.

Before filmmaking, he began studying Communications, Advertising, and Epistemology at the Pontifical Xavierian University in Bogotá, Colombia, where he also worked at a local radio station as a broadcaster.

For his first film, Unknown he was able to bring together a cast made up well-known Hollywood actors, such as Jim Caviezel, and Greg Kinnear. The film raised more than US $17 million worldwide.

His second feature film Paraiso travel, released in 2008, was the highest-grossing movie in Colombia that year. Time magazine named it as one of the best Latin American movies of the first decade of the century. Margarita Rosa de Francisco, John Leguizamo, and Ana de la Reguera were some of the recognizable Latin American actors that took part of the film.

In 2006, Variety magazine named Simon Brand one of the top 40 most influential Latin Americans in Hollywood.

He has been nominated for several awards such as the Grammy Awards (nominated four times), MTV Video Music Award, Clio Awards, and Telly Awards.

== Filmography ==
Year	Film	Credited as			
Year	Film	Director	Actor	Cinematographer	Notes
2006	Unknown	Yes	Yes		
2008	Paraíso Travel	Yes			
2010	Aftermath		Yes		One episode (When the Earth Stops Spinning).
2011	La sombrilla	Yes			TV movie.
2011	Encuere	Yes			Documentary.
2011	Mentes en shock				TV series. Creator.
2011	Fronteras	Yes			TV series. One episode (La Sombrilla).
2011	Cane/Cain			Yes	Short.
2013	Paper Giants: Magazine Wars		Yes		One episode (Episode 2).
2014	Default	Yes			

== Music videos filmography ==
1991

- Estados Alterados - "El velo"

1995

- Shakira - "Estoy Aquí"

1999

- Chayanne - "Salomé"
- Noelia - "Tú"
- MDO - "Groove With Me Tonight"
- Jaci Velasquez - "Llegar A Tí"
- Jaci Velasquez - "De Creer En Tí"
- Westlife - "Seasons in the Sun"
- Steps - "After the Love Has Gone"

2000

- Steps - "When I Said Goodbye"
- Thalía - "Entre El Mar Y Una Estrella
- Thalía - "Regresa a Mí"
- Thalía - "Arrasando"

2001

- Jessica Simpson - "Irresistible"
- Juanes - "Fíjate Bien"
- Ruff Endz - "Cash, Money, Cars, Clothes"
- Paulina Rubio - "I'll Be Right Here (Sexual Lover)"

2002

- Enrique Iglesias - "Mentiroso"
- Enrique Iglesias - "Quizás"
- Paulina Rubio - "Baila Casanova (Casanova)"

2003

- Enrique Iglesias feat. Lionel Richie - "To Love a Woman"
- Ricardo Arjona - "Minutos"
- Enrique Iglesias - "Para Qué la Vida"
- Chayanne - "Un Siglo Sin Tí"
- Chayanne - "Sentada Aquí en Mi Alma"

2004

- Alejandro Fernández - "Me Dediqué A Perderte"

2006

- Ricardo Arjona - "Mojado"
- Juanes - "A Dios le Pido" (European version)
- Ricky Martin - "It's Alright"

2007

- Alejandro Fernández - "Te Voy A Perder"
- Verónica Orozco - "Miénteme"

2008

- Fonseca - "Paraíso"
- Fanny Lú - "Tú No Eres Para Mi"
- Fonseca - "Enrédame"

2009

- Fanny Lú - "Celos"
- Volumen Cero - "Hollywood"
- La Quinta Estación feat. Marc Anthony - "Recuérdame"

2010

- Juan Luis Guerra - "Bachata en Fukuoka"
- Belanova - "Nada de Más"

2011

- Fanny Lú - "Fanfarrón"
- Wisin & Yandel - "Tu Olor"

2012

- Calle 13 - "La Bala"
- Stephanie Cayo - "El Alquimista"

2013

- Alejandro Fernández feat. Christina Aguilera - "Hoy Tengo Ganas de Ti"
- Letting Up Despite Great Faults - "Details Of My World"

2016

- Ricky Martin feat. Yotuel Romero - "La Mordidita"
