= Tu Angelito =

Single by Chino & Nacho

from the album Mi Niña Bonita: Reloaded
- Released: March 15, 2010
- Genre: Merengue, urban, pop
- Length: 3:56
- Label: Machete Music, Universal Music Latino
- Songwriters: Jesús Alberto Miranda Perez, Miguel Ignacio Mendoza
- Producer: Richy Peña

Chino & Nacho singles chronology
"Lo Que No Sabes Tú" (2009)	"Tu Angelito" (2010)	"Bla Bla Bla" (2010)

"Tu Angelito" (English: "Your Little Angel") is the lead single of the re-edition album, Mi Niña Bonita: Reloaded by Venezuelan duo Chino & Nacho. This is the only single of their re-edition album and has a music video in Chino & Nacho's VEVO page.

== Music video ==
The music video is in a high school just like in the original version of their other hit single, ""Mi Niña Bonita". In the video Chino and Nacho are trying to impress a cheerleader. Chino, being the high school hot-shot, tries to impress the girl with his image but fails. Nacho, being the nerd, tries to impress the girl by kindness and succeeds. The end of the music video has Chino embracing the "nerdness" that Nacho has.

== Chart performance ==
Chart (2011)	Peak position
US Hot Latin Songs (Billboard)	10
US Latin Pop Airplay (Billboard)	6
US Tropical Airplay (Billboard)	14
Venezuela (Record Report)	1
