= Mar de amor =

- Genre: Telenovela; Romance; Drama
- Created by: Delia Fiallo
- Written by: Alberto Gómez; María Antonieta Gutiérrez
- Directed by: Eric Morales
- Starring: Zuria Vega; Mario Cimarro; Erika Buenfil; Juan Ferrara; Ninel Conde; Mariana Seoane
- Theme music composer: Jorge Eduardo Murguía; Mauricio Arriaga; Rubén Zepeda
- Opening theme: Regálame un beso performed by Fanny Lú
- Country of origin: Mexico
- Original language: Spanish
- No. of episodes: 165

Production
- Executive producer: Nathalie Lartilleux
- Producer: Leticia Díaz
- Production locations: Filming; Televisa San Ángel; Mexico City, Mexico
- Cinematography: Adrián Frutos
- Editors: Alfredo Frutos; Pablo Peralta
- Camera setup: Multi-camera
- Running time: 42-45 minutes
- Production company: Televisa

Original release
- Network: Canal de las Estrellas
- Release: November 16, 2009 – July 2, 2010

Related
- María del Mar (1978)

Mar de amor (International title: Curse by The Sea) is a Spanish-language Mexican telenovela produced by Nathalie Lartilleux for Televisa. It is a remake of 1978 Venezuelan telenovela María del Mar. The telenovela aired on Canal de las Estrellas from November 16, 2009 to July 2, 2010. It stars Zuria Vega, Mario Cimarro, Erika Buenfil, Juan Ferrara, Ninel Conde and Mariana Seoane.

== Plot ==
For Estrella (Zuria Vega), life is like the sea: full of danger and evil, but also has the ability to fight and move forward. Far from her foster father, this humble fisher has suffered from the disorder that Crazy Casilda (Erika Buenfil) has. Casilda is Estrella's mother, who was in this state after being raped by Guillermo (Juan Ferrara), a wealthy man who is tormented by this sin. Since then, the crazy Casilda roams places aimlessly; however, in the absence of her parents, Estrella received shelter from her humble sponsors who have brought her up as their child. In her fondness for study, Estrella learned to read, and through books, knew what love is. Consequently, she begins to fall for the famous writer, Victor Manuel Galíndez (Mario Cimarro).

Victor Manuel has spent years traveling all over the world while writing his many adventures as a sailor, but one day, destiny and fate crosses his path and he meets Coral (Ninel Conde), a woman who washed up on a beach and has amnesia. This strange woman steals Victor Manuel's heart, but their relationship ends when Victor Manuel learns that Coral was killed in a tragic boat explosion. Devastated and feeling guilty about the death of Coral, Victor Manuel returns to Playa Escondida, the town where he grew up. He never imagines that Estrella might bring the sparkle back to his life.

After drinking, he flies a plane to Playa Escondida and falls asleep, almost crashing the plane into Estrella, while at fishing. Estrella recognizes the author who made her love reading. Very excited, she decides to help the sailor, who at first does not accept Estrella into his heart, but with the tenderness of a humble fisherman, Victor Manuel is overcome with passion for her.

Problems begin to arise for Estrella as a wealthy but selfish man, León Parra-Ibáñez (Manuel Landeta), wants to build a hotel complex on her sunny village. To carry out his plans, he wants to have the town cleared. All the fishermen who live in Playa Escondida would have to leave. Unfortunately, this land belongs to Victor Manuel. León wants to buy the land that belongs to Víctor Manuel; therefore, he convinces his self-centered oldest daughter, Oriana (Mariana Seoane), into seducing Victor Manuel in order to convince him to sell the land.

Casilda returns to Playa Escondida full of anger and revenge toward those who hurt her. She attempts suicide by almost drowning herself, but some villagers rescue her. Now, Estrella needs to work to cure her mother of these suicide thoughts. She wants to pay for therapy so she goes to the house of León and begins to work as his secretary. León is struck with her beauty and wants her and this only makes Oriana hate Estrella more. León's relative, Guillermo, visits from time to time; he learns that Estrella is the daughter he abandoned years ago. Drowned in a deep depression, he admits to Estrella that is he who caused so much damage to Casilda, and therefore, her father.

León is very jealous of Victor Manuel and wants Estrella for himself, so he pretends to be having sex with a girl who looks like Estrella, while Victor Manuel watches. Thinking it's Estrella, Victor Manuel, in revenge, becomes entangled with Oriana before Estrella's eyes. Hurt and heartbroken by what she has seen, Estrella takes Casilda to Mexico City to cure her condition. She avoids Victor Manuel and her father, who she still has a grudge against, for leaving them.

Once in Mexico City, Estrella meets the psychiatrist Dr. Hernán Irazábal (Marcelo Córdoba), who falls in love with her. Victor Manuel learns that it was all a trap from León and decides to search for Estrella, but soon, he encounters the woman that he fell in love in the past—Coral. She was found alive on the shore in Playa Escondida, without any memory. She doesn't even recognize Victor Manuel. He feels guilty about her situation and decides to help by letting her stay in his mansion. In reality, Coral just wants to stay at his side to conquer and enjoy his wealth.

Meanwhile, Hernán helps Casilda heal while becoming good friends with Estrella, who begins to feel affection for him. Time passes and Hernán helps Estrella become a successful woman. Guillermo Briceño gives Estrella his inheritance, frustrating León and Oriana. Her mother Casilda is cured of her disorder and Hernán begins to date Estrella and helps her overcome her disappointment in Víctor Manuel. Estrella is now working a big business and is very happy; however, the past comes back to haunt her.

Elsewhere, Victor Manuel cannot stop looking at Estrella and, to his dismay, Coral gets a tumor and will die in a few months. Hernán finds out about this and thinks he might lose Estrella if the two meet again. He tries to prevent them reuniting, but inevitably, their paths cross again. Estrella has changed and Victor Manuel is strapped to a deranged Coral. She has befriended León throughout their mutual hate for Victor Manuel and Estrella. They are full of vengeance and ready to finish them off. Throughout these months, Oriana begins to change. She sees that she was wrong to be so selfish and evil and has a change of heart. She begins to love Santos, a nice man that has always loved her. Thereafter, they have sex and after a while, get married.

Victor Manuel begins to see Estrella again. One night, he gets in a fight with Hernán. After Hernán is found dead, Victor Manuel is the main suspect and is put in jail when in reality, Hernán was killed by his nurse. During Oriana and Santos' wedding, Estrella is shot by León which leads to her paralysis, but she begins to do physical therapy and heals. Soon, Victor Manuel is proven innocent and returns to be with Estrella. Once Victor Manuel is released from jail, there is nothing standing in the way of him and Estrella being together.

Victor Manuel takes Estrella to a romantic getaway where they have sex. León tries to kill Victor Manuel by locking him in a lion's cage at a circus, but Coral appears and locks León inside the lion cage, too. Estrella finds them and helps Victor Manuel get out while León is killed by the lion. Coral has her arm and leg paralyzed because of the tumor so she commits suicide in the sea. In the end, only the true bond of love between Estrella and Victor Manuel prevailed. They seal their love with marriage and live happily ever after.

== Cast ==
=== Main ===
- Zuria Vega as Estrella Marina Briceño de Galíndez
- Mario Cimarro as Víctor Manuel Galíndez Garabán
- Ninel Conde as Catalina "Coral" Mijares
- Mariana Seoane as Oriana Parra-Ibáñez Briceño
- Manuel Landeta as León Parra-Ibáñez
- Erika Buenfil as Casilda "La Loca Casilda" de Briceño
- Juan Ferrara as Guillermo Briceño
- María Sorté as Aurora de Ruiz
- Norma Herrera as Violeta
- Raquel Olmedo as Luz Garabán
- Ignacio López Tarso as El Mojarras
- Sergio Reynoso as Antonio Ruiz

=== Supporting ===
- Marcelo Córdoba as Dr. Hernán Irazabal
- Arturo Carmona as Santos Nieves
- Patsy as Lucía Galíndez
- Amairani as Federica Martínez
- Tatiana as Isolda
- Victoria Díaz as Dr. Mercedes Acala
- Florencia del Saracho as Elena "Elenita" Parra-Ibáñez Briceño
- Nicolás Mena as Jorge Parra-Ibáñez Garabán
- Mar Contreras as Roselia
- Yuliana Peniche as Reyna
- Georgina Salgado as Esperanza Ruiz
- Renata Notni as Carmen "Carmita" Bracho
- Ramón Valdez Urtiz as Salvador "Chava" Ruiz
- Juan Ángel Esparza as Dr. Oswaldo Ascanio
- Elsa Cárdenas as Luciana de Irazabal
- Arlette Pacheco as Maura Larroja
- Elizabeth Dupeyrón as Mística
- Claudia Ortega as Silvia
- Claudia Silva as Inés Lombardo
- Renata Flores as Simona
- Beatriz Monroy as Crisanta
- Gerardo Albarrán as Roberto Oduver/Ricardo Oduver
- Javier Ruán as Bracho
- Toño Infante as Tiburón
- Ernesto Faxas as Gustavo
- Rodrigo Nehme as Lorenzo Garabán
- Mauricio Mejía as Lic. Marco Tulio Plaza
- Marco Méndez as David Bermúdez
- Adrián Martiñón as Martín
- Amor Flores as Chom
- Yirelka Yeraldine as Transito
- Oscar Ferretti as Padre Zamorita
- Aleyda Gallardo as Rita
- Evelyn Zavala as Abril
- Rosángela Balbó as Estefanía Peralta
- Erick Fernando as Tilico
- Queta Lavat as Alfonsina Zapata
- Rafael del Villar as Enrique
- Luis Bayardo as Judge Moncada
- Juan Carlos Bonet as León's lawyer
- Marius Biegai as Gerente Mía
- Fernando Estrada as Dr. Ángel Sánchez
- Jaime Lozano as Lic. Espinoza
- Sebastián Dopazo as Lic. Prado
- Hugo Macías Macotela as Judge
- Juan Ignacio Aranda as Fiscal
- Rafael Origel as Judge's Secretary
- José Antonio Ferral as Public Ministry
- Esteban Franco as Salvador's lawyer

== Awards and nominations ==
=== Premios TVyNovelas ===
Year	Category	Nominee	Result
2011	Best Leading Actress	María Sorté	Nominated
2011	Best Leading Actor	Juan Ferrara	Nominated
2011	Best Young Lead Actress	Renata Notni	Nominated
2011	Best Musical Theme	Regálame un beso	Nominated
