= 29th TVyNovelas Awards =

2011 Mexican TV awards

- Date: March 6, 2011
- Location: Mundo Imperial Forum, Acapulco, Guerrero
- Hosted by: Jacqueline Bracamontes & Alan Tacher

Highlights
- Most awards: Para volver a amar (7)
- Most nominations: Para volver a amar (11); Soy tu dueña (11)

Television/radio coverage
- Network: Canal de las Estrellas

The 29th TVyNovelas Awards were an academy of special awards to the best soap operas and TV shows. The awards ceremony took place on March 6, 2011 in the Mundo Imperial Forum, Acapulco, Guerrero. The ceremony was televised in Mexico by Canal de las Estrellas.

Jacqueline Bracamontes and Alan Tacher hosted the show. Para volver a amar won 7 awards, the most for the evening, including Best Telenovela. Other winners Soy tu dueña won 3 awards, Cuando me enamoro won 2 awards and Niña de mi corazón and Teresa won 1 each.

== Summary of awards and nominations ==
| Telenovela | Nominations | Awards |
|---|---|---|
| Para volver a amar | 11 | 7 |
| Soy tu dueña | 11 | 3 |
| Teresa | 7 | 1 |
| Llena de amor | 7 | 0 |
| Cuando me enamoro | 6 | 2 |
| Zacatillo, un lugar en tu corazón | 5 | 0 |
| Mar de amor | 4 | 0 |
| Niña de mi corazón | 3 | 1 |

== Winners and nominees ==
=== Telenovelas ===
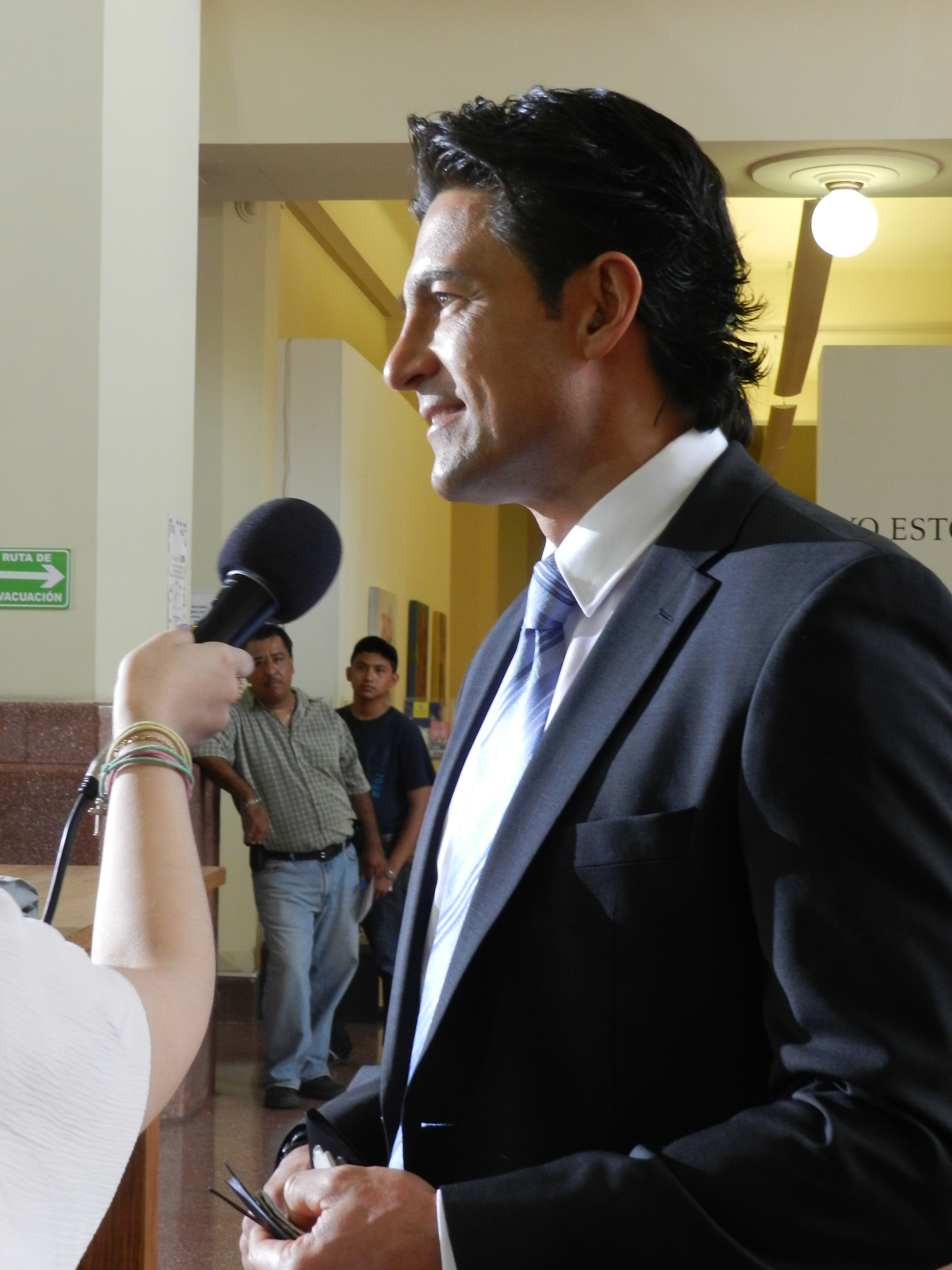
Fernando Colunga, winner for Best Actor.

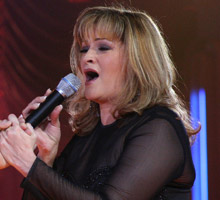
Rocío Banquells, winner for Best Antagonist Actress

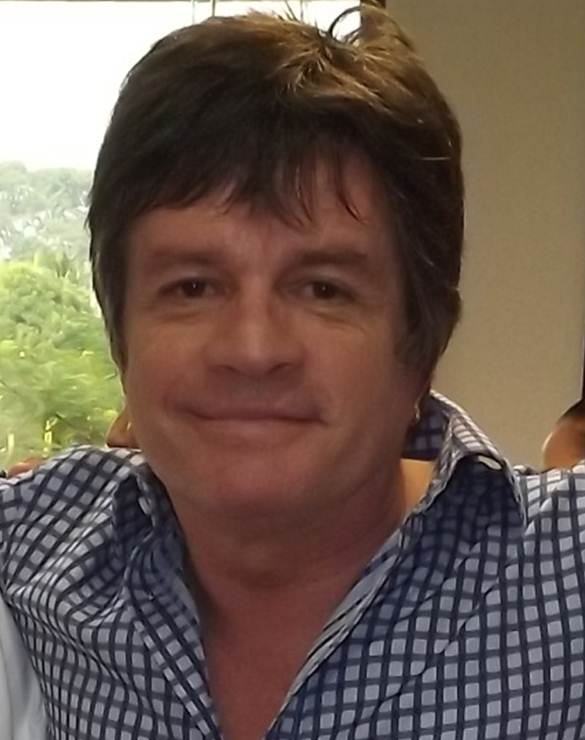
Alejandro Camacho, winner for Best Leading Actor

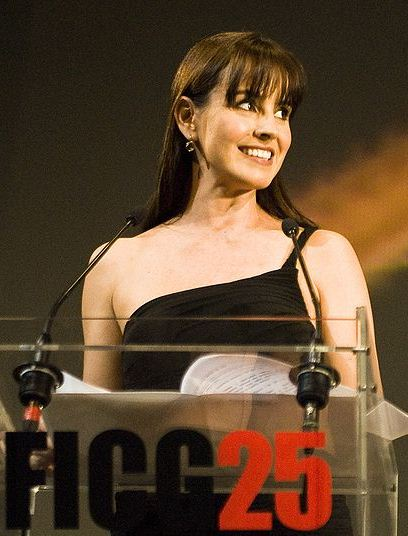
Alejandra Barros, winner for Best Co-lead Actress

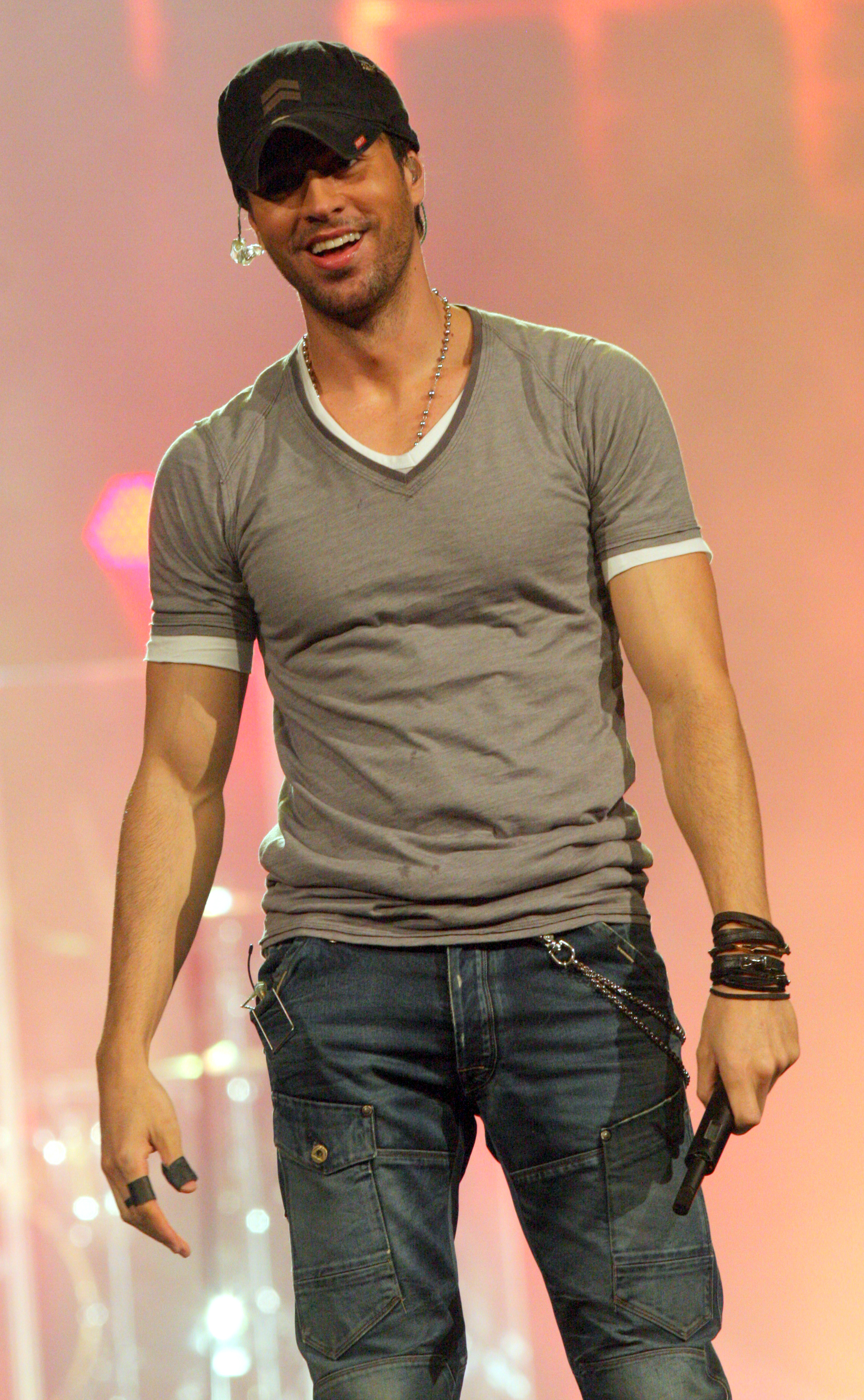
Enrique Iglesias, winner for Best Musical Theme (with Juan Luis Guerra) and awarded with a Special Award for his Musical Career

| Best Telenovela | Best Musical Theme |
|---|---|
| Para volver a amar; Cuando me enamoro; Llena de amor; Soy tu dueña; Teresa | "Cuando me enamoro" — Enrique Iglesias and Juan Luis Guerra – Cuando me enamoro; "Esa hembra es mala" — Gloria Trevi – Teresa; "Llena de amor" — Luis Fonsi – Llena de amor; "Para volver a amar" — Kany García – Para volver a amar; "Regálame un beso" — Fanny Lú – Mar de amor |
| Best Actress | Best Actor |
| Angelique Boyer – Teresa; Lucero – Soy tu dueña; Rebecca Jones – Para volver a amar | Fernando Colunga – Soy tu dueña; René Strickler – Para volver a amar; Sebastián Rulli – Teresa; Valentino Lanús – Llena de amor |
| Best Antagonist Actress | Best Antagonist Actor |
| Rocío Banquells – Cuando me enamoro; Azela Robinson – Llena de amor; Jacqueline Andere – Soy tu dueña; Margarita Magaña – Teresa | Juan Carlos Barreto – Para volver a amar; Alexis Ayala – Llena de amor; Manuel Landeta – Teresa; Sergio Goyri – Soy tu dueña |
| Best Leading Actress | Best Leading Actor |
| Magda Guzmán – Para volver a amar; Ana Martín – Soy tu dueña; Laura Zapata – Zacatillo, un lugar en tu corazón; María Sorté – Mar de amor; Silvia Pinal – Soy tu dueña | Alejandro Camacho – Para volver a amar; Eric del Castillo – Soy tu dueña; José Elías Moreno – Niña de mi corazón; Juan Ferrara – Mar de amor |
| Best Co-lead Actress | Best Co-lead Actor |
| Alejandra Barros – Para volver a amar; Ana Brenda Contreras – Teresa; Jessica Coch – Cuando me enamoro; Patricia Navidad – Zacatillo, un lugar en tu corazón | Jesús Ochoa – Para volver a amar; Arath de la Torre – Zacatillo, un lugar en tu corazón; David Zepeda – Soy tu dueña; René Casados – Cuando me enamoro |
| Best Young Lead Actress | Best Young Lead Actor |
| Paulina Goto – Niña de mi corazón; Gaby Mellado – Zacatillo, un lugar en tu corazón; Renata Notni – Mar de amor | Alfonso Dosal – Para volver a amar; Diego Amozurrutia – Llena de amor; Eleazar Gómez – Cuando me enamoro |
| Best Female Revelation | Best Male Revelation |
| Fátima Torre – Soy tu dueña; Christina Mason – Llena de amor; Thelma Madrigal – Para volver a amar | Paul Stanley – Soy tu dueña; Brandon Peniche – Niña de mi corazón; José Carlos Femat – Zacatillo, un lugar en tu corazón |

=== Others ===
| Best Entertainment Program | Best Competitions Program |
|---|---|
| Hoy; Desmadruga2; Se vale | 100 mexicanos dijeron; Resbalón; Todo el mundo cree que sabe; TV millones |
| Best Restricted TV Program | Best Special Program |
| Miembros al Aire; Adictos 2; Es de noche... y ya llegué; MoJoe; Netas divinas | Iniciativa México; Fiesta mexicana; Furia Musical Recognition; Nuestra Belleza México; Telehit Awards |
Best Series
Gritos de muerte y libertad; Hermanos y detectives; Locas de amor; Los simuladores

=== Special awards ===
- A Lifetime in Telenovelas: Alicia Rodríguez
- A Lifetime in Telenovelas: Ignacio López Tarso
- Lifetime Artistic Achievement Award by Bancomer: Jacqueline Bracamontes
- Musical Career: Enrique Iglesias
- TVyNovelas Debut: Jackie Sauza

=== Performers ===
| Name(s) | Performed |
|---|---|
| Alejandra Guzmán | "Día de suerte" |
| Enrique Iglesias | "Cuando me enamoro" "Tonight" "No me digas que no" |
| Fanny Lu | "Regáleme un beso" |
| Gloria Trevi | "Esa hembra es mala" "Me río de ti" |
| Kany García | "Para volver a amar" |
| La Original Banda El Limón | "Zacatillo" |
| Luis Fonsi | "No me doy por vencido" "Llena de amor" |
| Maite Perroni; Marco Di Mauro | "A partir de hoy" |

=== Absent ===
People who did not attend the ceremony and were nominated in the shortlist in each category:

- Ana Brenda Contreras
- Fernando Colunga (He said thanks in a video)
- Gloria Trevi (She was not present during the presentation of the shortlist for Best Musical Theme)
- Lucero
- Silvia Pinal (She was not present during the presentation of the shortlist for Best Leading Actress)

== In Memoriam ==
- Blanca Sánchez
- Rodolfo de Anda
- Mauricio Kleiff
- Alberto Mariscal
- Carmelita González
- Enrique Quezada
- Hector Meneses
- Gabriel Vargas
- Carlos Monsiváis
- Sergio Vega
- Olga Guillot
- Alí Chumacero
- Sergio Celda
- Claudio Obregón
- Sandro de América
- José Saramago
- María Teresa Rivas
- Roberto Cantoral
- Germán Dehesa
- Leon Segura
- Kippy Casado
