= El Fuerte =

El Fuerte (Spanish: "The Fort") may refer to:

- El Fuerte de Samaipata, a UNESCO World Heritage Site in Bolivia
- El Fuerte, Sinaloa, a city of Sinaloa, Mexico
- El Fuerte (Street Fighter), a character in the Street Fighter video game series

Fuerte may also refer to:

- "bolívar fuerte", the official name of the Venezuelan bolívar
- Fuerte River, a river in Sinaloa, Mexico
- Fuerte, a variety of avocado
- "Fuerte" (song), a song by Nelly Furtado
- Fuerte (album), by Miranda!
- "Fuerte", a song by Belinda included in Belinda (Belinda Peregrín album)
- "Fuerte", a Fanny Lu song
- Fuerte, one of the names used in various times and places for the Peso coin

== See also ==
- "La Fuerte", a song by Shakira from the album Las Mujeres Ya No Lloran, 2024
