= Supremo (album) =

Studio album by Chino & Nacho
- Released: October 18, 2011
- Recorded: 2011
- Genre: Merengue, Reggaeton, Bachata, Latin pop
- Label: Machete Music

Chino & Nacho chronology
| Mi Niña Bonita: Reloaded (2010) | Supremo (2011) | Supremo: Reloaded (2013) |

Singles from Supremo
- 1. "El Poeta" Released: July 25, 2011; 2. "Bebé Bonita" Released: January 2, 2012; 3. "Regálame Un Muack" Released: August 6, 2012; 4. "Sin Tí" Released: October 1, 2012

Supremo is the third studio album by Venezuelan duo Chino & Nacho released on October 18, 2011. The album marks a move away from reggaeton, and more towards a "tropical fusion" or merengue influenced sound. "Pobre Corazón" is the theme for the telenovela Rafaela, while "¿Será Que Tengo La Culpa?" served as the soundtrack for La viuda joven. It was released in a reloaded version on March 26, 2013. The reissue features the album version of the single "Sin Tí", the remix of "Regálame Un Muack" with El Potro Álvarez, unreleased studio tracks "Mi Mejor Cancion", "No He Podido Verte" and "Don Juan (Fanny Lú song)" with Fanny Lu, the latter which was released as a single on October 10, 2012. It also includes club remixes of "El Poeta" and "Bebé Bonita". Supremo was nominated Tropical Album of the Year at the Premio Lo Nuestro 2013.

== Track listing ==
1. "Príncipe Azul"
2. "Sin Tí"
3. "Estoy Enamorado"
4. "El Poeta"
5. "Bebé Bonita" (featuring Jay Sean)
6. "Regálame Un Muack" (featuring El Potro Álvarez)
7. "Loco, Loco"
8. "Por Eso Quiero"
9. "Bachata Rosa"
10. "Pobre Corazón"
11. "¿Será Que Tengo La Culpa?" (featuring Luis Enrique)

Supremo: Reloaded

1. "Sin Ti"
2. "Mi Mejor Cancion" (New)
3. "No He Podido Verte" (New)
4. "Don Juan" (feat. Fanny Lu)
5. Regalame Un Muack (featuring El Potro Alvarez)
6. "El Poeta" (Club Mix)
7. "Bebe Bonita" (Brass Knuckles) (featuring Jay Sean)

Other song from 2011: "El Facebook"

== Charts ==
Chart performance for Supremo
| Chart (2011) | Peak position |
|---|---|
| US Billboard 200 | 130 |
| US Top Latin Albums (Billboard) | 1 |
| US Latin Pop Albums (Billboard) | 1 |

Chart performance for Supremo: Reloaded
| Chart (2013) | Peak position |
|---|---|
| US Top Latin Albums (Billboard) | 42 |
| US Latin Pop Albums (Billboard) | 10 |

== Certifications ==
| Region | Certification |
|---|---|
| Colombia (ASINCOL) | Gold |

== See also ==
- List of number-one Billboard Latin Albums from the 2010s
