= Fanfarrón =

Single by Fanny Lu

from the album Felicidad y Perpetua
- Released: June 29, 2011
- Genre: Latin pop
- Length: 3:21
- Label: Universal Music Latino
- Songwriters: José Gaviria, Fanny Lu, Andrés Munera

Fanny Lu singles chronology
"Mar de Amor" (2010)	"Fanfarrón" (2011)	"Ni Loca" (2011)

"Fanfarrón" (English: Loudmouth) is a Latin pop song by Colombian recording artist Fanny Lu. It was written and produced by Lu, José Gaviria and Andrés Munera, for her third studio album. The song was released worldwide on June 29, 2011, followed by the album Felicidad y Perpetua in November.

== Music video ==
The music video was released on August 25 on the Fanny Lu's VEVO and the other video channels. The clip was recorded in the old headquarters of the Bank of America of the Spring St. in the Los Angeles city. It was under the direction by Simon Brand, with whom he had previously worked in past music video´s "Tú no eres para mi" and "Celos". The choreography was directed by Mihran Kirakosian who had worked with Madonna, Britney Spears, Kylie Minogue and others. The wardrobe was designed by the Brit Bardo, while the makeup and the hairstyle were done by Jomari Goyoso. The video uses a unique edit of the song since it incorporates a section of formation drumming with accompanying audio which replaces the song's usual middle eight.

== Track listing ==
1. "Y Si Te Digo" (Album version) — 3:21
2. "Fanfarrón" (Tainy's Urban Remix) — 3:18
3. "Fanfarrón" (Brazuka Power Mix) — 3:57
4. "Fanfarrón" (Regional Mexican Version) — 3:20

== Charts ==
Chart (2011–2012)	Peak position
Mexico (Billboard Mexican Airplay)	35
US Hot Latin Songs (Billboard)	24
US Latin Pop Airplay (Billboard)	17
US Tropical Airplay (Billboard)	7
Venezuela (Record Report)	1
