= Poeta quadrinotata =

Scientific classification
- Kingdom: Animalia
- Phylum: Arthropoda
- Class: Insecta
- Order: Lepidoptera
- Superfamily: Noctuoidea
- Family: Erebidae
- Genus: Poeta
- Species: P. quadrinotata

Binomial name
- Poeta quadrinotata Walker, 1865

Synonyms
- Hypogramma quadrinotata Walker, 1865

Species of moth

Poeta quadrinotata is a moth of the family Notodontidae first described by Francis Walker in 1865. It is found in Sri Lanka, Peninsular Malaysia, Sumatra and Borneo.

Its body is blackish brown with white fasciations. Fasciation is not punctate and consists of white edging on each side of fine, irregular, dark fasciae. The margin of the forewing has a central black spot.
