= Sin Ti (Chino & Nacho song) =

Single by Chino & Nacho

from the album Supremo
- Released: October 1, 2012
- Genre: Latin pop
- Length: 4:08
- Label: Machete Music

Chino & Nacho singles chronology
"Regálame Un Muack" (2012)	"Sin Ti" (2012)	"Don Juan" (2012)

"Sin Ti" (English: Without You) is a Latin pop song by Venezuelan musical duo Chino & Nacho. It was released as the fourth single from their third studio album Supremo (2011) on October 1, 2012. The song was included in their EP Supremo: Reloaded.

== Track listing ==
- Digital download
1. "Sin Tí" - 4:08

== Charts ==
Chart (2013)	Peak position
US Hot Latin Songs (Billboard)	21
US Latin Airplay (Billboard)	7
US Latin Pop Airplay (Billboard)	7
US Tropical Airplay (Billboard)	6
Venezuela (Record Report)	6
