= List of number-one Billboard Hot Tropical Songs of 2008 =

The Billboard Tropical Songs is a chart that ranks the best-performing tropical songs of the United States. Published by Billboard magazine, the data are compiled by Nielsen Broadcast Data Systems based collectively on each single's weekly airplay.

== Chart history ==
Issue date	Song	Artist	Ref
January 5	"Conteo regresivo"	Gilberto Santa Rosa	
January 12	"Conteo regresivo"	Gilberto Santa Rosa	
January 19	"Sexy movimiento"	Wisin & Yandel	
January 26	"Conteo regresivo"	Gilberto Santa Rosa	
February 2	"La travesía"	Juan Luis Guerra y 440	
February 9	"La travesía"	Juan Luis Guerra y 440	
February 16	"Conteo regresivo"	Gilberto Santa Rosa	
February 23	"Conteo regresivo"	Gilberto Santa Rosa	
March 1	"Conteo regresivo"	Gilberto Santa Rosa	
March 8	"Te quiero"	Flex	
March 15	"Te quiero"	Flex	
March 22	"Te quiero"	Flex	
March 29	"Ella menea"	NG2	
April 5	"Te quiero"	Flex	
April 12	"Te quiero"	Flex	
April 19	"Te quiero"	Flex	
April 26	"Sin perdón"	Héctor Acosta	
May 3	"Sin perdón"	Héctor Acosta	
May 10	"Te quiero"	Flex	
May 17	"¿Dónde están esos amigos?"	El Chaval	
May 24	"¿Dónde están esos amigos?"	El Chaval	
May 31	"Te quiero"	Flex	
June 7	"¿Dónde están esos amigos?"	El Chaval	
June 14	"¿Dónde están esos amigos?"	El Chaval	
June 21	"Te quiero"	Flex	
June 28	"Yo no sé perdonarte"	Víctor Manuelle	
July 5	"Amor desperdiciado"	Frank Reyes	
July 12	"Amor desperdiciado"	Frank Reyes	
July 19	"Amor desperdiciado"	Frank Reyes	
July 26	"El perdedor"	Aventura	
August 2	"El perdedor"	Aventura	
August 9	"Amor desperdiciado"	Frank Reyes	
August 16	"Amor desperdiciado"	Frank Reyes	
August 23	"¿Dónde están esos amigos?"	El Chaval	
August 30	"He venido"	MJ	
September 6	"Te quiero"	Flex	
September 13	"Te quiero"	Flex	
September 20	"Te quiero"	Flex	
September 27	"Tú me confundes"	Charlie Cruz	
October 4	"Como yo"	Juan Luis Guerra y 440	
October 11	"En aquel lugar"	Adolescent's Orquesta	
October 18	"Amor inmortal"	Chayanne	
October 25	"Me vio llorar"	Jorge Celedón & Jimmy Zambrano featuring Héctor Acosta	
November 1	"En aquel lugar"	Adolescent"s Orquesta	
November 8	"En aquel lugar"	Adolescent"s Orquesta	
November 15	"Amor inmortal"	Chayanne	
November 22	"Amor inmortal"	Chayanne	
November 29	"Amor inmortal"	Chayanne	
December 6	"Amor inmortal"	Chayanne	
December 13	"En aquel lugar"	Adolescent"s Orquesta	
December 20	"En aquel lugar"	Adolescent"s Orquesta	
December 27	"En aquel lugar"	Adolescent"s Orquesta	

== See also ==
- List of number-one Billboard Hot Tropical Songs of 2009
- List of number-one Billboard Hot Latin Songs of 2008
- List of number-one Billboard Hot Latin Pop Airplay of 2008
