= Mar de Amor (song) =

Single by Fanny Lu

from the album Dos (Deluxe Edition)
- Released: June 21, 2010
- Genre: Latin pop
- Length: 3:42
- Label: Universal Music Latino
- Songwriters: José Gaviria, Fanny Lu

Fanny Lu singles chronology
"Corazón Perdido" (2009)	"Mar de Amor" (2010)	"Fanfarrón" (2011)

"Mar de Amor" (English: Sea of Love) also known "Regálame un Beso" (Give me a Kiss), is a song by Colombian recording artist Fanny Lu to promote the Mexican soap opera Mar de amor. It was written and produced by José Gaviria and included in the deluxe edition from her second studio album Dos. The song was released on June 21, 2010, only in Mexico. Lu was nominated in the category Best Musical Theme for the soap opera Mar de Amor.

== Track listing ==
Digital download
No.	Title	Writer(s)	{{{extra_column}}}	Length
1.	"Mar de Amor"	José Gaviria	Fanny Lu	3:42

== Charts ==
Chart (2010)	Peak position
Mexico (Billboard Mexican Airplay)	20
Mexico (Billboard Espanol Airplay)	14
Perú (UNIMPRO)	16

== Accolades ==
Year	Award	Category	Nominated	Result
2011	TVyNovelas Awards	Best Musical Theme	Regálame Un Beso	Nominated
