= Default (2014 film) =

- Directed by: Simón Brand
- Written by: Jim Wolfe Jr. Dan Bence
- Produced by: Julián Giraldo; Mauricio Osorio
- Starring: David Oyelowo
- Cinematography: Gerardo Mateo Madrazo
- Edited by: Ricardo Javier
- Music by: Xander Lott
- Production company: Delfault Pictures
- Distributed by: GoDigital
- Release date: October 17, 2014
- Running time: 88 minutes
- Country: United States
- Language: English

Default is a 2014 American action thriller film directed by Simón Brand and featuring David Oyelowo.

== Cast ==
- Greg Callahan as Saltzman
- Katherine Moennig as Juliana
- Stephen Lord as Kane
- Connor Fox as Pete Bowers
- Jeanine Mason as Marcela
- Peres Owino as Nadifa Sabisi
- David Oyelowo as Atlas
- Benjamin Ochieng as Edward
- James C. Victor as Finley
- Harbi Mohameud as Skinny
- Hakeemshady Mohamed as Blue Eyes
- Karim Ndiaye as Leo

== Reception ==
The film has a 33% rating on Rotten Tomatoes.

Dennis Harvey of Variety gave the film a positive review and wrote, "Resourceful, Los Angeles-shot low-budgeter is solidly assembled, with Xander Lott’s unobtrusive yet unsettling score a plus."

Ben Kenigsberg of The New York Times wrote, "Yet even the failure to find a persuasive closing note doesn’t detract from Mr. Oyelowo’s riveting performance."

Martin Tsai of the Los Angeles Times gave the film a negative review and wrote, "Director Simon Brand devotes so much running time to fear-mongering and grotesque stereotypes that a last-ditch effort at moral ambiguity and a critique on muckraking barely register."
