= Unknown (2006 film) =

Film by Simón Brand

- Promotional film poster
- Directed by: Simón Brand
- Written by: Matthew Waynee
- Produced by: Rick Lashbrook; Darby Parker; John S. Schwartz
- Starring: Jim Caviezel; Greg Kinnear; Bridget Moynahan; Joe Pantoliano; Barry Pepper; Jeremy Sisto; Peter Stormare
- Cinematography: Steve Yedlin
- Edited by: Luis Carballar; Paul Trejo
- Music by: Angelo Milli
- Production companies: Rick Lashbrook Films; Eleven Eleven Films LLC
- Distributed by: IFC First Take; The Weinstein Company
- Release date: November 3, 2006
- Running time: 85 minutes
- Country: United States
- Language: English
- Budget: $3.7 million
- Box office: $3.4 million

Unknown is a 2006 American mystery thriller film directed by Simón Brand and written by Matthew Waynee. It stars Jim Caviezel, Greg Kinnear, Joe Pantoliano, Barry Pepper, and Jeremy Sisto as a group of men kidnapped and locked in a factory with no memory of how they arrived there.

The film was previewed before a theater audience for the first time in New York City on December 13, 2005.

== Plot ==
In a warehouse, a handful of amnesiac men regain consciousness. One is bound to a chair, another has been handcuffed and shot, a third has a broken nose, and the other two, one wearing a jean jacket and one wearing a rancher shirt, are also wounded. The man in the jean jacket wakes up first. He makes sure that everyone is alive. The windows are barred and the only door has a mechanized lock. He answers a ringing phone. The caller asks what is happening and the jean jacket man says that everyone is fine. The caller says that he will return in some hours. Somewhere else, a money drop-off is occurring. William Coles Jr. has been kidnapped.

In the warehouse, the bound man asks to be untied. As the jean jacket man prepares to untie him, the man with the rancher shirt convinces him not to, saying that the bound man is not on the same side, or he would not have been tied up. As the jean jacket and rancher shirt men look for the keys to release the handcuffed man and treat his wound, the man with the broken nose wakes up and fights them. At the drop-off, the signal in the money bag goes silent; the cops enter to find the money gone.

In the warehouse, the men find a newspaper featuring a story about the kidnapping of Coles, a wealthy businessman. The men suspect that they were involved with the kidnapping. They begin to experience flashbacks.

A gun is recovered, and the jean jacket man wins possession of it. Various attempts to free themselves, including trying to attract attention through a hole in the wall, and shooting out a window, fail. The men decide to collaborate to fight off the criminals who are coming.

The handcuffed man recalls a harrowing incident from his childhood when he was comforted by his friend. He claims the jean jacket man is his friend. However, the jean jacket man cannot verify this. The handcuffed man dies from his wounds.

The police piece together who they believe the kidnappers are. They show photos of the suspects to Coles' wife Eliza. The handcuffed man, the bound man, and the jean jacket man are among the photos.

At the warehouse, the gang returns from the money pickup. The bound man remembers that he is part of the gang and tries warning them of the trap. In the confusion, he is shot along with one of the gang members. After the rancher shirt man is pushed out at gunpoint, the others surrender. The jean jacket man recalls that he is part of the gang, but cannot accept that he is a criminal. He is greeted by the snakeskin boots-wearing gang leader and chastised for letting things go wrong in the warehouse. A fight broke out between kidnappers and victims. Chemicals spilled during the fight rendered everyone unconscious and induced temporary amnesia. The jean jacket man is tasked with killing the rancher shirt man and the broken nosed man, and says that he must kill them or be killed himself.

After hearing gunshots near the grave that the bound man dug before losing his memory, the snakeskin boots leader asks the jean jacket man if he is looking at a cop. This sparks a memory that the jean jacket man was a cop working undercover in the gang. As the leader looks over to see an empty grave, the broken nosed man comes out of the shadows to attack the gang members. The broken nosed man is killed, as are the remaining gang members. The rancher shirt man saves the jean jacket man by shooting the leader, who has a gun leveled at the jean jacket man. The police arrive. The jean jacket man is praised for having survived so long undercover.

The rancher shirt man is Coles, and as both are being treated, Eliza arrives and hugs him. Upon seeing Eliza, the jean jacket man remembers that they were having an affair. He arranged the kidnapping, planning to get rich and win Eliza. Horrified and guilt ridden, he takes the ransom money to the officers. Coles later introduces Eliza to him.

== Cast ==
- Jim Caviezel as Jean Jacket / Mitch Wozniak
- Greg Kinnear as Broken Nose / Richard McCain
- Bridget Moynahan as Eliza Coles
- Barry Pepper as Rancher Shirt / William Coles Jr.
- Joe Pantoliano as Bound Man / Brockman
- Jeremy Sisto as Handcuffed Man / Bobby Kinkade
- Peter Stormare as Snakeskin Boots / Stefan Burian
- Chris Mulkey as Detective James Curtis
- Clayne Crawford as Detective Anderson
- Kevin Chapman as Detective McGahey
- Mark Boone Junior as Bearded Man / Juarez
- Wilmer Calderon as Detective Molina
- David Selby as Police Captain Parker
- Adam Rodriguez as County Doctor
- Jeff Daniel Phillips as Iron Cross / Ray
- Victoria Justice as Daughter / Erin

== Production ==
Portions of the film were shot in the Coachella Valley, California.

== Critical reception ==
On the review aggregator website Rotten Tomatoes, 38% of critics gave the film positive reviews, based on 47 reviews. The website's consensus reads, "Though it boasts a talented cast, this thriller fails to make you care about the twisty mystery of the men's identities and situation." On Metacritic, the film has an average score of 44 out of 100, based on 17 reviews.
