= Llegaré =

Studio album by Stephanie Cayo
- Released: 25 June 2011
- Recorded: 2010–11; Bogotá, Colombia
- Genre: Pop, adult contemporary, jazz
- Length: 41:07
- Label: Babel Discos, EMI Colombia
- Producer: José Gaviria

Singles from Llegaré
- 1. "Llegaré" Released: July 9, 2011; 2. "El Alquimista" Released: September 25, 2012; 3. "Tú" Released: February 7, 2013

Llegaré (English: "I will arrive") is the debut studio album by Latin actress and recording artist Stephanie Cayo. It was released in Colombia on 25 June 2011. Production for the album came primarily from José Gaviria, alongside Stephanie Cayo.

== Track listing ==
=== International version ===
All tracks are written by Stephanie Cayo and José Gaviria

Standard edition
No.	Title	Producer(s)	Length
1.	"Llegaré"	José Gaviria	1:43
2.	"Dejarte Ir"	José Gaviria	3:08
3.	"Quién Te Dijo"	José Gaviria	3:35
4.	"Será"	José Gaviria	3:40
5.	"Ya Se Fue"	José Gaviria	4:05
6.	"El Alquimista"	José Gaviria	2:59
7.	"Yo Te Quiero Tanto"	José Gaviria	3:27
8.	"23"	José Gaviria	3:02
9.	"No Más De Eso"	José Gaviria	3:16
10.	"Tú"	José Gaviria	3:41
11.	"Es Tiempo"	José Gaviria	3:42
12.	"Renuncio a Ti"	José Gaviria	4:01

CD+DVD version/Llegaré Live Sessions
No.	Title	Length
13.	"Llegaré (Live Sessions)"	3:21
14.	"Dejarte ir (Live Sessions)"	2:51
15.	"El Alquimista (Live Sessions)"	3:14
16.	"Ya Se Fue (Live Sessions)"	4:03
17.	"Renuncio a Ti (Live Sessions)"	4:40

== Personnel ==
- Stephanie Cayo - Composer, Performer, Lyricist, Producer, Primary Artist, Vocals (Background)
- Ray Staff - Mastering
- Andres Munera - Composer, Keyboard Programming, Sample Programming
- José Gaviria - Producer, Composer, Guitar, Vocals (Background)
- Simon Brand - Photography
- Diego Cadavid - Photography
