= El Poeta (song) =

Single by Chino & Nacho

from the album Supremo
- Released: July 25, 2011
- Genre: Bachata, merengue
- Length: 3:41
- Label: Machete Music; Universal Music Latino
- Songwriters: Jesús Alberto Miranda Perez; Miguel Ignacio Mendoza
- Producer: Richy Peña

Chino & Nacho singles chronology
"Bla Bla Bla" (2010)	"El Poeta" (2011)	"Bebé Bonita" (2012)

"El Poeta" (English: The Poet) is the lead single by Venezuelan duo Chino & Nacho, from their album, Supremo. It is the duo's fourth single and has a music video in their YouTube VEVO page. An AT&T re-make was made for the commercial featuring Chino & Nacho.

== Music video ==
The music video was directed by Gustavo A. Garzon. In the beginning it shows Nacho as a writer struggling on what to write. First he starts with a Black and White toned video in Ciudad de Mexico in the year 1943. Nacho has Chino as his protagonist with a female other. He types that their love, though pure, can not be. It then shows the father of the woman disapprove of the two's relationship. But Nacho decides to make it in the year 1971 with Chino and the woman dance in a party with friends in a 1970s type of scenario. But, just like the first piece, the father disapproves of the two's relationship. And just before the father and Chino fight, Nacho stops typing and the two freeze frame as Nacho experiences writer's block again. It is present time with the same theme as the last two scenes but this time Chino rides off with the woman as the father chases after the two and catches up to them with a pack of goons and then Nacho stops and rips off that part and adds a new one with the two escaping but, as a result, having a bystander get run over. And shows that it is Nacho who is run over and the video ends with a peace sign by Chino and Nacho in the background.

== Charts ==
Chart (2011)	Peak position
US Hot Latin Songs (Billboard)	8
US Latin Pop Airplay (Billboard)	8
US Tropical Airplay (Billboard)	24
Venezuela (Record Report)	1
