= List of number-one hits of 1983 (Mexico) =

This is a list of the songs that reached number one in Mexico in 1983, according to the Notitas Musicales magazine with data provided by Radio Mil(which also provided charts for Billboard's "Hits of the World" between 1969 and 1981).

Notitas Musicales was a bi-weekly magazine that published two record charts:

- "Canciones que México canta" ("Songs that Mexico sings"), which listed the Top 10 most popular Spanish-language songs in Mexico, and
- "Hit Parade", which was a Top 10 of the most popular songs in Mexico that were in languages other than Spanish.

== Chart history ==
Issue Date	Spanish-language songs		Songs in other languages		Ref.
Issue Date	Song	Artist(s)	Song	Artist(s)	Ref.
1 January	"Directo al corazón"	Luis Miguel	"Can't Take My Eyes Off You"	Boys Town Gang	
15 January	"Directo al corazón"	Luis Miguel	"Can't Take My Eyes Off You"	Boys Town Gang	
1 February	"Directo al corazón"	Luis Miguel	"Can't Take My Eyes Off You"	Boys Town Gang	
15 February	"Directo al corazón"	Luis Miguel	"Can't Take My Eyes Off You"	Boys Town Gang	
1 March	"Claridad"	Menudo	"Words"	F. R. David	
15 March	"Claridad"	Menudo	"Words"	F. R. David	
1 April	"Castillos"	Amanda Miguel	"Words"	F. R. David	
15 April	"Castillos"	Amanda Miguel	"Words"	F. R. David	
1 May	"Tenías que ser tan cruel"	Rocío Dúrcal	"Mickey"	Toni Basil	
15 May	"Tenías que ser tan cruel"	Rocío Dúrcal	"Mickey"	Toni Basil	
1 June	"Yo te amo, te amo"	Yuri	"Die Hard Lover"	Frank Loverde	
15 June	"Yo te amo, te amo"	Yuri	"Die Hard Lover"	Frank Loverde	
1 July	"Yo te amo, te amo"	Yuri	"Die Hard Lover"	Frank Loverde	
15 July	"Yo te amo, te amo"	Yuri	"Die Hard Lover"	Frank Loverde	
1 August	"Yo te amo, te amo"	Yuri	"Die Hard Lover"	Frank Loverde	
15 August	"Mentiras"	Daniela Romo	"Die Hard Lover"	Frank Loverde	
1 September	"Mentiras"	Daniela Romo	"Die Hard Lover"	Frank Loverde	
15 September	"Mentiras"	Daniela Romo	"Die Hard Lover"	Frank Loverde	
1 October	"Caray"	Juan Gabriel	"Billie Jean"	Michael Jackson	
15 October	"Caray"	Juan Gabriel	"Billie Jean"	Michael Jackson	
1 November	"Busco un amor"	Lorenzo Antonio	"Billie Jean"	Michael Jackson	
15 November	"Celos"	Daniela Romo	"Flashdance... What a Feeling"	Irene Cara	
1 December	"Celos"	Daniela Romo	"Flashdance... What a Feeling"	Irene Cara	
15 December	"Celos"	Daniela Romo	"Maniac"	Michael Sembello	

== See also ==
- 1983 in music

== Sources ==
- Print editions of the Notitas Musicales magazine.
