= List of number-one Billboard Latin Pop Airplay songs of 2008 =

The Billboard Latin Pop Airplay chart ranks the best-performing Spanish-language pop music singles in the United States. Published by Billboard magazine, the data are compiled by Nielsen SoundScan based collectively on each single's weekly airplay.

== Chart history ==
| Issue date | Song | Artist(s) | Ref. |
|---|---|---|---|
| January 5 | "Me Enamora" | Juanes | |
| January 12 | "Me Enamora" | Juanes | |
| January 19 | "Me Enamora" | Juanes | |
| January 26 | "Me Enamora" | Juanes | |
| February 2 | "Me Enamora" | Juanes | |
| February 9 | "Me Enamora" | Juanes | |
| February 16 | "Me Enamora" | Juanes | |
| February 23 | "Gotas De Agua Dulce" | Juanes | |
| March 1 | "Gotas De Agua Dulce" | Juanes | |
| March 8 | "Gotas De Agua Dulce" | Juanes | |
| March 15 | "Gotas De Agua Dulce" | Juanes | |
| March 22 | "Gotas De Agua Dulce" | Juanes | |
| March 29 | "Gotas De Agua Dulce" | Juanes | |
| April 5 | "Gotas De Agua Dulce" | Juanes | |
| April 12 | "Gotas De Agua Dulce" | Juanes | |
| April 19 | "Si No Te Hubieras Ido" | Maná | |
| April 26 | "Si No Te Hubieras Ido" | Maná | |
| May 3 | "Si No Te Hubieras Ido" | Maná | |
| May 10 | "Si No Te Hubieras Ido" | Maná | |
| May 17 | "Si No Te Hubieras Ido" | Maná | |
| May 24 | "Si No Te Hubieras Ido" | Maná | |
| May 31 | "Si No Te Hubieras Ido" | Maná | |
| June 7 | "Si No Te Hubieras Ido" | Maná | |
| June 14 | "Si No Te Hubieras Ido" | Maná | |
| June 21 | "Si No Te Hubieras Ido" | Maná | |
| June 28 | "¿Dónde Están Corazón?" | Enrique Iglesias | |
| July 5 | "Si No Te Hubieras Ido" | Maná | |
| July 12 | "Si No Te Hubieras Ido" | Maná | |
| July 19 | "Si No Te Hubieras Ido" | Maná | |
| July 26 | "Si No Te Hubieras Ido" | Maná | |
| August 2 | "Si No Te Hubieras Ido" | Maná | |
| August 9 | "Si No Te Hubieras Ido" | Maná | |
| August 16 | "Si No Te Hubieras Ido" | Maná | |
| August 23 | "Si No Te Hubieras Ido" | Maná | |
| August 30 | "No Me Doy Por Vencido" | Luis Fonsi | |
| September 6 | "No Me Doy Por Vencido" | Luis Fonsi | |
| September 13 | "No Me Doy Por Vencido" | Luis Fonsi | |
| September 20 | "No Me Doy Por Vencido" | Luis Fonsi | |
| September 27 | "No Me Doy Por Vencido" | Luis Fonsi | |
| October 4 | "No Me Doy Por Vencido" | Luis Fonsi | |
| October 11 | "No Me Doy Por Vencido" | Luis Fonsi | |
| October 18 | "No Me Doy Por Vencido" | Luis Fonsi | |
| October 25 | "No Me Doy Por Vencido" | Luis Fonsi | |
| November 1 | "No Me Doy Por Vencido" | Luis Fonsi | |
| November 8 | "No Me Doy Por Vencido" | Luis Fonsi | |
| November 15 | "No Me Doy Por Vencido" | Luis Fonsi | |
| November 22 | "No Me Doy Por Vencido" | Luis Fonsi | |
| November 29 | "No Me Doy Por Vencido" | Luis Fonsi | |
| December 6 | "No Me Doy Por Vencido" | Luis Fonsi | |
| December 13 | "No Me Doy Por Vencido" | Luis Fonsi | |
| December 20 | "Como Duele" | Ricardo Arjona | |
| December 27 | "No Me Doy Por Vencido" | Luis Fonsi | |

== See also ==
- List of number-one Billboard Hot Latin Songs of 2008
