= Mi Niña Bonita =

Studio album by Chino & Nacho
- Released: 6 April 2010
- Recorded: 2009
- Genre: Reggaeton, Merengue, Bachata, Pop Latino, Mambo
- Length: 44 min.
- Label: Machete Music; Universal Music Latino
- Producer: Richy Peña

Chino & Nacho chronology
Época de Reyes (2008)	Mi Niña Bonita (2010)	Mi Niña Bonita: Reloaded (2010)

Singles from Mi Niña Bonita
- 1. "Mi Niña Bonita" Released: April 13, 2009; 2. "Se Apagó La Llama" Released: July 20, 2009; 3. "Lo Que No Sabes Tú" Released: August 31, 2009; 4. "Mi Niña Bonita (US Version)" Released: April 19, 2010

Mi Niña Bonita is the second studio album by Venezuelan reggaeton duo Chino & Nacho. It was released on 6 April 2010. It has 12 tracks, 2 featuring guest stars like Don Omar and Baroni.

== Track listing ==
#	Title	Performer(s)	Featured Guest(s)
1	Mi Niña Bonita	Chino & Nacho	
2	Se Apagó La Llama	Chino & Nacho	R.K.M & Ken-Y
3	Friday	Chino & Nacho	
4	Lo Que No Sabes Tú	Chino & Nacho	El Potro Alvarez & Baroni
5	Me Mata, Me Mata	Chino & Nacho	
6	La Pastillita	Chino & Nacho	
7	Dentro De Mí	Chino & Nacho	Don Omar
8	Ese Hombre Soy Yo	Chino & Nacho	
9	Voy A Caer En La Tentación	Chino & Nacho	
10	Una Opportunidad	Chino & Nacho	
11	Contigo	Chino & Nacho	
12	You Make Me Feel (Higha)	Chino & Nacho	Baroni

== Charts ==
=== Weekly charts ===
Chart (2010)	Peak position
US Top Latin Albums (Billboard)	4
US Latin Rhythm Albums (Billboard)	1

=== Year-end charts ===
Chart (2010)	Position
US Top Latin Albums (Billboard)	29
Chart (2011)	Position
US Top Latin Albums (Billboard)	34

== Sales and certifications ==
Region	Certification	Certified units/sales
United States (RIAA)	Gold (Latin)	50,000^{^}
^{^} Shipments figures based on certification alone.

== Mi Niña Bonita: Reloaded ==
Mi Niña Bonita: Reloaded

Studio album reissue of Mi Niña Bonita by Chino & Nacho
- Released: 24 August 2010
- Recorded: 2010
- Genre: Merengue, Reggaeton, Bachata
- Label: Machete Music
- Producer: Richy Peña

Chino & Nacho chronology
Mi Niña Bonita (2010)	Mi Niña Bonita: Reloaded (2010)	Supremo (2011)

Singles from Mi Niña Bonita: Reloaded
- 1. "Tu Angelito" Released: March 15, 2010

Mi Niña Bonita: Reloaded is a re-edition of the Mi Niña Bonita released on 24 August 2010.

=== Track listing ===
1. Tu Angelito
2. Mi Niña Bonita
3. Se Apagó La Llama (feat. R.K.M & Ken-Y)
4. Friday
5. Lo Que No Sabes Tú (feat. El Potro Álvarez & Baroni)
6. Me Mata, Me Mata
7. La Pastillita
8. Dentro de Mí (feat. Don Omar)
9. Ese Hombre Soy Yo
10. Voy a Caer En La Tentación
11. Una Oportunidad
12. Contigo
13. You Make Me Feel (Higha) (feat. Baroni)
14. Niña Bonita (Dance Remix)
15. Niña Bonita (Urban Remix) (feat. Angel & Khriz)
16. Niña Bonita (Banda Version) (feat. Dareyes de la Sierra)
17. Boleto de Amor
18. Cuando Se Muere El Amor

== See also ==
- List of number-one Billboard Latin Rhythm Albums of 2010
