= Felipe Pirela =

Venezuelan musician

Background information
- Also known as: El Bolerista de América
- Born: Felipe Antonio Pirela Morón; September 4, 1941; Maracaibo, United States of Venezuela
- Died: July 2, 1972 (aged 30) San Juan, Puerto Rico
- Genre: Bolero
- Occupation: Singer
- Years active: 1960–1972
- Labels: Discomoda, Fonograma, Velvet

Felipe Pirela (1941–1972) was a Venezuelan singer and one of the most renowned interpreters of bolero music. He was born on September 4, 1941, in Maracaibo, Venezuela, and was murdered on July 2, 1972, in San Juan, Puerto Rico. Pirela began his musical career in the early 1960s and quickly gained popularity with his unique voice and passionate performances.

Early life

Pirela was born Felipe Antonio Pirela Morón, the eighth child of Felipe Pirela Monsalve, a bricklayer, and Lucía Morón, a homemaker and merchant, in the El Empedrao neighborhood of Maracaibo. He showed an early interest in singing, encouraged by his mother, and began performing on the radio as a child. At age 13, he formed a group called Los Happy Boys with two of his brothers and neighborhood friends, performing boleros popularized by singers such as Alfredo Sadel and Lucho Gatica.

Early career

Pirela began performing as a singer on the radio in his hometown of Maracaibo. Around 1957, he entered a singing competition on Radio Caracas Televisión, where he placed third. He was later invited to perform by bandleader Tito Rodríguez, and traveled to Mexico, where he recorded his first album, Un Solo Camino. It was during this period in Mexico that he was given the nickname "El Bolerista de América."

Billo's Caracas Boys

In June 1960, Pirela was hired by bandleader Billo Frómeta to join his orchestra, Billo's Caracas Boys, alongside fellow singers Cheo García and Yayo Montes. His debut with the orchestra took place on July 2, 1960. Pirela and García quickly became two of the most popular voices in the group, and the orchestra's shows drew large crowds during his time with them. He left the orchestra in 1963 to begin a solo career, receiving offers from several other bandleaders and record labels before signing with the Venezuelan label Velvet.

Career success

Pirela became one of the best-selling recording artists in the Americas during the 1960s, touring throughout the United States, Colombia, the Dominican Republic, Puerto Rico, Ecuador, and Peru. His label, Velvet, awarded him a platinum record for being the first Venezuelan artist to sell over one million records.

Final years

In 1971, after spending time performing internationally, Pirela returned to Venezuela hoping to relaunch his career, including a contract with the television network Venevisión. However, the arrangement fell through after a scheduling dispute, and he found less work than he had hoped for. During this period, he renewed his relationship with bandleader Billo Frómeta and briefly considered rejoining his orchestra full-time before his career was cut short by his death the following year.

Death

Pirela was shot and killed in the early morning hours of July 2, 1972, outside a hotel in the Isla Verde neighborhood of San Juan, Puerto Rico. Days later, a local man named Luis Rosado Medina was taken into police custody and confessed to the killing, claiming it stemmed from an unpaid debt related to cocaine.

Legacy

Pirela's influence endured for decades after his death. In 1979, salsa singer Héctor Lavoe released Recordando a Felipe Pirela, a tribute album covering several of Pirela's songs. In 2015, a biographical film about his life, El Malquerido, was released in Venezuela.

He also received several honors in Venezuela during his career, including the Disco de Oro, the Mara de Oro, and the Guaicaipuro de Oro.

Pirela achieved great success with his interpretations of romantic ballads and boleros, becoming known as "El Bolerista de América" (The Bolero Singer of the Americas). His smooth and emotive singing style, combined with his charismatic stage presence, captivated audiences across Latin America and beyond.

Some of Felipe Pirela's most famous songs include "Sombras," "Por Retenerte," "Entre La Espada y La Pared," and "Quiéreme Siempre." His career was cut short when he was murdered at the age of 30. Despite his untimely death, Felipe Pirela's legacy as a talented bolero singer continues to influence and inspire musicians to this day.

== Discography ==
=== With Bands ===
Year	Title	Record label
1960	Carnaval Con Los Peniques	Discomoda (Venezuela)
1960	Paula	Discos Gramcko (Venezuela)
1960	Comunicando	Discomoda (Venezuela)
1961	Canciones de Ayer y Hoy	Discomoda (Venezuela)
1961	Tres Regalos	Discomoda (Venezuela)
1962	25 Años de Billo	Discomoda (Venezuela)
1962	Esta Noche Billo	Discomoda (Venezuela)
1963	Billo en Fonograma	Fonograma (Venezuela)
1963	Mosaico 10	Fonograma (Venezuela)

=== Solo ===
Year	Title	Record label
1963	Un Solo Camino: México	Velvet (México)
1964	Únicamente Tú	Velvet (Venezuela)
1964	Entre Tu Amor y Mi Amor	Velvet (Venezuela)
1965	El Bolerista de América	Velvet (Venezuela)
1965	Sin Ella	Velvet (Venezuela)
1965	Sombras Nada Más	Velvet (Venezuela)
1965	Felipe...Sigue de Frente	Velvet (Venezuela)
1966	Pirela y sus Éxitos	Velvet (Venezuela)
1966	Cuando Vivas Conmigo	Velvet (Venezuela)
1966	Injusto Despecho	Velvet (Venezuela)
1966	Mosaicos Románticos (Note: Compilación)	Velvet (Venezuela)
1966	Recordando A Rafael Hernández	Velvet (Venezuela)
1966	Dios Sabe Lo Que Hace	Velvet (Venezuela)
1967	Canta Felipe Pirela	Velvet (Venezuela)
1967	Felipe Interpreta A Manzanero	Velvet (Venezuela)
1967	Boleros Con Guitarras	Velvet (Venezuela)
1968	Lo Que Es La Vida	Velvet (Venezuela)
1969	De Todo Soy Capaz	Velvet (Venezuela)
1969	Un Poco de Mí	Velvet (Puerto Rico)
1970	Tu Camino y el Mío	Velvet (Puerto Rico)
1970	Aquí Mís Éxitos	Velvet (Venezuela)
1972	Encadenados	Velvet (Puerto Rico)
1972	Volvamos A Querernos	Velvet (Puerto Rico)
1972	El adiós...del inmortal (Note: Este LP terminado antes de la muerte del cantante, sería titulado originalmente Como Tú, Una Flor)	Velvet (Puerto Rico)

=== Events ===
Year	Title	Record label
1961	Guaicaipuro de Oro 1960	Discomoda (Venezuela)
1962	Guaicaipuro de Oro 1961 (Note: Contiene el Mosaico Nº 5 que no figuró en los álbumes LP con Billo's Caracas Boys)	Discomoda (Venezuela)
1964	Hit Parade de Navidad (Note: Recopilación de temas navideños grabados por artistas de Velvet en 1964. Aparece Felipe Pirela cantando el famoso tema "Noche de Paz", grabado este año en México con la Orquesta de Chucho Rodríguez y que no formó parte de su discografía oficial.)	Velvet (Venezuela)
