= Más Vale Tarde =

- Starring: Alex Cambert
- Country of origin: United States
- Original language: Spanish

Production
- Running time: 60 minutes

Original release
- Network: Telemundo
- Release: November 29, 2007 – April 23, 2008

Más Vale Tarde ("It's Better Late") is a Spanish-language variety/talk show hosted by Alex Cambert. The show's debut was November 29, 2007 on Telemundo. The show followed a similar format to other English-language late-night shows. The last show aired in April 2008.

== Competition ==
Univision announced previously in its 2006 upfront presentation that they would produce their own Late Night show "¡Ay Qué Noche!" (Oh What a Night!) which would be hosted by Cristián de la Fuente. Despite the announcement, the show was not launched.

A Oscuras Pero Encendidos was the first late night talk show for Hispanics in the US Hosted By Paul Bouche. The show started as a local Miami Production in 1995, was picked up by Galavision in 1997 and finally launched on Telemundo where it aired until 2001.
