= Don Juan (Fanny Lu song) =

Single by Fanny Lu featuring Chino & Nacho

from the album Felicidad y Perpetua
- Released: October 10, 2012
- Genre: Latin pop
- Length: 3:35
- Label: Universal Music Latino
- Songwriters: Fanny Lu, Miguel Mendoza, Jesús Miranda, Andrés Munera

Fanny Lu singles chronology
"Ni Loca" (2011)	"Don Juan" (2012)	"Mujeres" (2013)

Chino & Nacho singles chronology
"Sin Tí" (2012)	"Don Juan" (2012)	"Dime Si Tú" (2013)

"Don Juan" is a Latin pop song by Colombian recording artist Fanny Lu. It was released October 10, 2012, as the third single and from his third studio album Felicidad y Perpetua (2011). More later the song was included on the Chino & Nacho's EP Supremo: Reloaded.

== Chart performance ==
"Don Juan" was No. 1 in Venezuela for two consecutives weeks, being her third consecutive number-one single at the top of the Record Report. The song debuted at No. 39 on the US Tropical Songs chart on February 12, 2013, peaking at No. 4.

== Track listing ==
- Digital download
1. "Don Juan (feat. Chino & Nacho)" - 3:35

== Charts ==
=== Weekly charts ===
Chart (2012/2013)	Peak position
US Tropical Airplay (Billboard)	4
US Latin Rhythm Airplay (Billboard)	12
Venezuela (Record Report)	1

=== Year-end charts ===
Chart (2012)	Peak position
Venezuela (Record Report)	54
