= Lágrimas Cálidas =

Studio album by Fanny Lu
- Released: August 8, 2006
- Genre: Tropipop; Latin pop
- Language: Spanish
- Label: Universal Music Latino
- Producer: Jose Gaviria; Andres Munera

Fanny Lu chronology
Lágrimas Cálidas (2006)	Dos (2009)

Singles from Lágrimas Cálidas
- 1. "No Te Pido Flores" Released: February 2006; 2. "Te Arrepentiras" Released: 2006; 3. "Y Si Te Digo" Released: 2007

Lágrimas Cálidas (English: Warm Tears) is the debut studio album by Colombian recording artist Fanny Lu, released on August 8, 2006. The record contains ten tracks, most of which were composed by Jose Gaviria, and produced with Andres Munera. Musically, the album experiments with tropipop, which is composed of the genres of vallenato, merengue, and pop music. Recording for the album took place in 2004 in three cities: Miami, Bogota and Medellin. An international version of the album, containing two remixes, was released exclusively in United States, Spain and Colombia.

The album was certified gold in Colombia, Venezuela and Ecuador and ranked number thirteen on the Billboard Tropical Albums chart in the United States. The album earned Lu many accolades, including a Latin Grammy nomination, five Billboard Latin Music Awards nominations, and three Premios Shock nominations, winning two. Three singles were released from the record, two of which, "No Te Pido Flores" and "Y Si Te Digo", reached number one on the Billboard Tropical Songs chart.

== Background ==
While studying for a degree in engineering at the University of Los Andes in 1994, Fanny Lu began her career in the entertainment industry as a host for shows such as Locomotora, Siempre Música, and Radio Hits y Bailoteca. As a host on Locomotora, she was given the opportunity to work with musicians such as Luis Manuel Díaz, Gil Magno, and Cesar Franco. She met Colombian producer, Jose Gaviria, during her career in television, and they began working on a musical project, but the production was halted, because Fanny was busy in her television career. Eight years later, she reunited with Gaviria to finish this recording. Her experience as a television host led to her signing a music deal with Universal Music Latino. Her first album under that agreement was Lágrimas Cálidas, which was released in Colombia on January 1, 2005.

== Composition ==
Lágrimas Cálidas was produced by Jose Gaviria and Andres Munera. It was recorded at Crescent Moon Studios and Big Dog Studios in Miami, New World Studios in Bogota and Promix Estudios in Medellin. The genre of the album is defined as Tropipop, because it mixes tropical genres such as vallenato and merengue with pop and Caribbean influences. The album opens with "No Te Pido Flores" ("I'm Not Requesting Flowers"), where the predominant instruments are the accordion, guitar and caja vallenata. Lyrically, the song begins with the absence of her man, but then, in the chorus, transitions into a warning not to fall in love with material things. The second track, "Lágrimas Cálidas" ("Warm Tears"), is a vallenato-stylized pop ballad, expressing her suffering due to being abandoned by her lover. "Te Arrepentiras" ("You'll Regret"), is about a woman who surrendered completely to a man who did not appreciate her.

"Solo Quiero" ("Only Want") begins with an accordion solo, and is a song explaining to her lover that she only wants to be with him forever, because with him all the things in life are more beautiful. The fifth track, "Cariñito" ("Sweetie"), describes her need for the affection of the person she loves, and her desire to remedy the void left in her heart. "Sin Razones" ("Without Reasons"), express the reasons why she should not have to prove her love, while "Y Si Te Digo" ("And If I Tell You"), tells of her desire to confess her love to the person who doesn't know she loves him. "Es Por Ti" ("It Is For You") is a poem describing the strength of an all-encompassing love. The penultimate track, "Para Que Si Tu No Estas" ("For That If You Aren't"), asks her boyfriend whether or not she should suffer for him. The eleventh and final track of the album, "Me Acordare de Ti" ("I Will Remember You"), expresses that everything she feels, sees, and perceives, reminds her of her beloved.

== Reception ==
The album was certified gold in Colombia, Venezuela and Ecuador. In the United States, the album debuted at number 18 on the Billboard Tropical Albums chart, peaking three weeks later at number 13. Lágrimas Cálidas was generally well received. At the Colombian Premios Shock, it won the category of Radio Album, as well as winning best Radio Song for "No Te Pido Flores". At the 15th Latin Billboard Music Awards, the album was nominated for two awards: Tropical Album of the Year for a Female Artist and Best New Artist. At the 2007 Latin Grammy Awards, "No Te Pido Flores" received a nomination for Best Tropical Song, but lost to "La Llave De Mi Corazón", by Juan Luis Guerra.

== Singles ==
"No Te Pido Flores" was the first single from the album, released in 2005. The song was a success in Latin America, reaching number one in Colombia, Ecuador, Perú and Venezuela. In the United States, it also reached number one on the Billboard Latin Tropical Airplay chart. It was nominated for two Billboard Latin Music Awards and a Latin Grammy for Best Tropical Song. "No Te Pido Flores" has two music videos, one recorded in Lake Guatavita, Sesquilé, Colombia, and the international version, which was recorded in the Plaza Moreno in La Plata, Argentina.

Unlike "No Te Pido Flores", the album's second single, "Te Arrepentirás", was released after the release of Lágrimas Cálidas in Latin America. The third and final single, "Y Si Te Digo", was released on May 27, 2007. In Latin America, the song did not have the same success as the first single, but in the United States, the song hit number one on Billboard's Hot Latin Songs chart and Billboard's Tropical Airplay chart. The song won a Billboard Latin Music Award for Best Tropical Airplay for a new artist.

== Track listing ==
Lágrimas Cálidas — Standard edition
No.	Title	Writer(s)	Length
1.	"No Te Pido Flores"	José Gaviria	4:02
2.	"Lágrimas Cálidas"	Gaviria; Fanny Lu	4:25
3.	"Te Arrepentiras"	Gaviria	3:09
4.	"Solo Quiero"	Gaviria	4:25
5.	"Cariñito"	Gaviria	3:27
6.	"Sin Razones"	Gaviria	3:18
7.	"Y Si Te Digo"	Gaviria	4:30
8.	"Es Por Ti"	Gaviria; Lu	3:20
9.	"Para Que Si Tu No Estas"	Gaviria; America Jimenez	4:15
10.	"Me Acordare De Ti"	Gaviria; Daniela Guzmán	3:33

Lágrimas Cálidas — International version
No.	Title	Writer(s)	Length
11.	"Te Arrepentiras" (Remix)	Gaviria	3:37
12.	"No Te Pido Flores" (Remix)	Gaviria	3:47

== Credits and personnel ==
The following credits are from Allmusic:

Performance credits

- John Lozano – accordion
- Richard Bravo – percussion
- Ernesto "Kako" Alvarez – bass
- Jose Gaviria – keyboards
- Vicky Echeverri – vocals
- Catalina Rodríguez – vocals
- Alfredo Rosado – caja vallenata, guacharaca
- Edigio Cuadrado – accordion
- Andrés Castro – guitar

Technical credits

- Jose Gaviria - mixing, producer, programming, musical director
- Andres Munera – producer
- Boris Milán – engineer
- Mike Fuller – mastering
- Rodrigo Bravo – assistant engineer
- Joe Novo – assistant
- Pablo Sánchez – assistant
- Carlos Gaviria – photography
- Fanny "Lu" Buenaventura – composer, co-producer, vocals

== Charts ==
Chart (2007)	Peak position
US Tropical Albums (Billboard)	13

== Certifications ==
Region	Certification	Certified units/sales
Colombia	Gold	
Ecuador	Gold	7,000
Venezuela	Gold	

== Release history ==
Country	Date	Version	Format	Label	Ref.
Colombia	January 1, 2005	Standard	CD	Universal Music Latino	
Colombia	April 4, 2006	Standard	Digital download	Universal Music Latino	
Mexico	April 4, 2006	Standard	Digital download	Universal Music Latino	
United States	August 8, 2006	International version	CD; Digital download	Universal Music Latino	
Spain	March 26, 2007	International version	CD; Digital download	Universal Music Latino	
