= Poeta (moth) =

Scientific classification
- Kingdom: Animalia
- Phylum: Arthropoda
- Class: Insecta
- Order: Lepidoptera
- Superfamily: Noctuoidea
- Family: Erebidae
- Subfamily: Tinoliinae
- Genus: Poeta; Walker, 1865

Genus of moths

Poeta is a genus of moths in the family Erebidae.

== Species ==
- Poeta denotalis Walker, 1865
- Poeta quadrinotata Walker, 1865
