= Dos (Fanny Lu album) =

- Standard edition artwork. The deluxe edition is the same artwork but only the background is changed from red to blue and its banner changed from navy blue to brown.

Studio album by Fanny Lu
- Released: December 8, 2008
- Genres: Tropical, Latin pop, Rock Latino, Vallenato
- Length: 37:37
- Label: Universal Music Latin
- Producers: Fanny Lu, Andres Munera, Jose Gaviria

Fanny Lu chronology
Lágrimas Cálidas (2006)	Dos (2008)	Felicidad y Perpetua (2011)

Singles from Dos
- 1. "Tú No Eres Para Mi" Released: October 2008; 2. "Celos" Released: 2009; 3. "Corazón Perdido" Released: 2009; 4. "Mar de Amor" Released: June 2010

Professional ratings
Review scores
Source	Rating
Billboard	(positive)

Dos (English: Two) is the title of the second album by Colombian Pop and Vallenato singer Fanny Lu. The album was released in Colombia on December 8, 2008, and in the United States and Puerto Rico the following week. In Colombia, Dos went straight to number one in the album charts in its debut week. The album features the lead single and the official song of the year in Colombia, "Tú No Eres Para Mi" (You Are Not For Me).

== Album information ==
The album was greeted with huge anticipation following the success of the lead single "Tú No Eres Para Mi". The hit was number one on Colombian radio for eleven weeks. As well as this, there were high expectations considering the success of Fanny's first album, Lágrimas Cálidas (English: "Warm Tears"), which spent nine weeks at number one in Colombia. Fanny Lu produced the album and co-wrote many of the tracks, most notably "Un Minuto Más" (English: "One More Minute"), a duet with Noel Schajris. The song is a tribute to her late father who was murdered. Weeks before the release of the album, Fanny stated that "We were looking for a fusion of sounds. I didn't limit myself. I gave myself the luxury of exploring, because it was important not to repeat what I'd done. For example, many times, instead of accordions, we experimented with winds. This album is like a walk along all those genres I love, and all the songs have their own palate and color."

== Track listing ==
No.	Title	English title	Length
1.	"Corazón Perdido"	"Lost Heart"	3:13
2.	"Tú No Eres Para Mi"	"You Are Not for Me"	3:27
3.	"Te Va A Costar (La, La, La)"	"It's Going to Cost You"	4:01
4.	"Amor Sincero"	"Sincere Love"	3:55
5.	"Un Minuto Más" (featuring Noel Schajris)	"One More Minute"	3:51
6.	"Celos"	"Jealousy"	2:56
7.	"Ya No Puedo Más"	"I Can't Anymore"	3:20
8.	"Mañana Es Otro Dia"	"Tomorrow is Another Day"	3:20
9.	"No Renuncio"	"I Don't Give Up"	3:35
10.	"Lloro Por Ti"	"I Cry for You"	3:34
11.	"Mi Rutina Para Amar"	"My Routine to Love"	3:25

Deluxe edition
No.	Title	Length
5.	"Celos"	2:56
6.	"Ya No Puedo Más"	3:20
7.	"Mañana Es Otro Dia"	3:20
8.	"No Renuncio"	3:35
9.	"Lloro Por Ti"	3:34
10.	"Mi Rutina Para Amar"	3:25
11.	"Mar de Amor"	3:41
12.	"Tú No Eres Para Mi" (Angel y Kriz Mashup)	3:36
13.	"Tú No Eres Para Mi" (George Figares Remix)	3:45
14.	"Tú No Eres Para Mi" (Babyfunk Remix)	4:58
15.	"Tú No Eres Para Mi" (Video Version)	3:40
16.	"Celos" (Urban Remix featuring J.King and Maximan)	3:45

Bonus DVD
No.	Title	Length
1.	"Tú No Eres Para Mi (Video)"	3:43
2.	"Celos (Video)"	2:51
3.	"Celos (Video)" (Urban Remix featuring J.King and Maximan)	4:43

== Credits and personnel ==
Credits adapted from Dos liner notes.

- Diego Acosta – audio engineer, mastering engineer
- Pablo Bernál – drums
- César Bohorquéz – audio engineering, mastering engineer
- Richard Bravo – percussion
- Andrés Castro – guitar
- Mike Couzzi – audio engineer, mastering engineer
- Yina Gallego – vocals
- Iker Gastaminza – audio production, composer, executive producer, producer
- José Gaviria – mix engineer
- Lee Levin – drums
- Juan Cristóbal Losada – audio engineer, mastering engineer
- John Lozano – accordion, vocals
- Fanny Lu – vocals
- Boris Milan – mix engineer
- Teddy Mullet - trombone, trumpet
- Andrés Múnera – audio production, composer, guitar, producer, record producer
- Javier Olivencia – saxophone
- José Luis Perales – composer
- Jordan Quamina – audio engineer
- Luisito Quintero – percussion
- Catalina Rodríguez - vocals
- Milton Salcedo - audio production, post-producer, recorder
- Noel Schajris - composer
- Camilo Valencia – saxophone

== Charts ==
Chart (2007)	Peak position
US Top Latin Albums (Billboard)	70
US Latin Pop Albums (Billboard)	14

== Certifications ==
Region	Certification	Certified units/sales
Colombia	Gold	
Mexico (AMPROFON)	Gold	32,000
Venezuela	Gold	
