= Época de Reyes =

Studio album by Chino & Nacho
- Released: July 10, 2008
- Recorded: 2007–2008
- Genre: Reggaeton, Bachata, Salsa, Urbano Latino, Pop Latino
- Label: Derechos Reservados

Chino & Nacho chronology
Época de Reyes (2008)	Mi Niña Bonita (2010)

Singles from Época de Reyes
- 1. "Vagabundo de Amor" Released: 2007; 2. "Dentro de Mí" Released: 2008; 3. "Me Mata, Me Mata" Released: October 27, 2008; 4. "Ese Hombre Soy Yo" Released: 2007; 5. "Voy A Caer En La Tentación" Released: 2008; 6. "Tu Caballero" Released: 2008; 7. "Profesora" Released: 2007

Época de Reyes (English: Time of Kings) is the debut studio album by Venezuelan reggaeton duo Chino & Nacho. It was released on July 10, 2008.

== Track listing ==
Disc One

1. Dentro de Mí (feat. Don Omar)
2. Ese Hombre Soy Yo
3. Tu Caballero
4. Taki
5. La Esquina (Reloaded)
6. Vagabundo de Amor (feat. Divino)
7. Voy a Caer En La Tentación
8. Te Están Buscando
9. Vuelve Ya
10. Profesora (Reloaded)
11. You Make Me Feel (Higha) (feat. Baroni)

Disc Two

1. Me Mata, Me Mata
2. Contigo
3. Renacer
4. Una Oportunidad Dentro de Mí (Versión Bachata)
5. La Pastillita (Reloaded)
6. Así Es El Amor
7. Triste Corazón (feat. Huáscar Barradas)
8. Se Apago La Llama
9. Tú y Yo (Reloaded)
10. Así Es El Amor (Versión Salsa)
11. Ese Hombre Soy Yo (Versión Salsa)
