= Felicidad y Perpetua =

Studio album by Fanny Lu
- Released: November 21, 2011
- Genre: Latin pop, Ranchera, electropop, Vallenato
- Language: Spanish
- Label: Universal Music Latino
- Producer: Fanny Lu, Andrés Munera, José Gaviria, Steve Greenberg, Mario Balducci, Jesús Miranda, Manuela Mejía

Fanny Lu albums chronology
| Dos (2008) | Felicidad y Perpetua (2011) | Voz y Éxitos (2012) |

Singles from Felicidad y Perpetua
- 1. "Fanfarrón" Released: June 29, 2011; 2. "Ni Loca" Released: December 1, 2011; 3. "Don Juan" Released: October 10, 2012

Felicidad y Perpetua (Happiness and Everlasting) is the third album by Colombian singer-songwriter Fanny Lu, released by Universal Music Latino on November 21, 2011. As executive producer of the album, Fanny Lu enlisted a variety of producers to collaborate like Andrés Munera, José Gaviria, Steve Greenberg, Mario Balducci, Jesús Miranda and Manuela Mejía. Sonically, the album is rooted in Latin pop, electropop and Ranchera, but also incorporates a variety of other genres such as Vallenato.

One single was released before the album's release: "Fanfarrón". This song topped all the Venezuelan charts and had different entries to the Latin charts. Recently was released her second single "Ni Loca" featuring the Puerto Rican artist featuring Dalmata on December 1, 2011, and she confirmed to the Spain newspaper "El País" that her third single is "Don Juan".

In March 2012, during an interview, Fanny Lu revealed that "Don Juan" would be the third single. On October 2, 2012, this song was released. The video has not yet been recorded, but this could be recorded in late December and premiered in either February or March 2013 before Fanny Lu started her first world tour "Voz y Éxitos World Tour".

== Track listing ==
| No. | Title | Writer(s) | Length |
|---|---|---|---|
| 1. | "La Mala" | Wise Cruz, Fanny Lu, Andrés Munera | 3:38 |
| 2. | "No Estas Conmigo" (featuring Zion & Lennox) | José Gaviria, Fanny Lu, Andrés Munera | 3:29 |
| 3. | "Fanfarrón" | José Gaviria, Fanny Lu, Andrés Munera | 3:21 |
| 4. | "Te Amo, Te Amo" | Gabriele Balducci, Mario Balducci, Steve Greenberg, Giuseppe Malgioglio | 3:43 |
| 5. | "Don Juan" (featuring Chino & Nacho) | Fanny Lu, Miguel Mendoza, Jesús Miranda, Andrés Munera | 3:35 |
| 6. | "Que Vuelva" | Fanny Lu, Miguel Mendoza, Andrés Munera | 3:36 |
| 7. | "Ni Loca" (featuring Dalmata) | Wise Cruz. Fanny Lu, Andrés Munera | 3:29 |
| 8. | "Un Beso y un Adiós" | Ray Casillas, Wise Cruz, Fanny Lu, Andrés Munera | 3:39 |
| 9. | "Prueba de Amor" | Fanny Lu, Manuela Mejia, Andrés Munero | 3:08 |
| 10. | "Me Equivoqué" | José Gaviria, Fanny Lu, Andrés Munera | 3:20 |
| Total length: | | | 34:57 |

== Charts ==
| Chart (2011) | Peak position |
|---|---|
| U.S. Billboard Latin Albums | 70 |
| U.S. Billboard Latin Pop Albums | 18 |
