= Richy Peña =

- Also known as: Richy
- Born: Richard Peña; October 27, 1984 (age 41); Santo Domingo, Dominican Republic
- Genres: Reggaeton, Merengue
- Occupations: Songwriter, Producer, Engineer
- Instruments: Piano
- Years active: (2000-Present Producer/Engineer/Songwriter)
- Website: twitter.com/richypena

Richard Peña (born October 27, 1984) is a Dominican record producer and songwriter based in the United States.

== Life and career ==
Peña was born in Santo Domingo, Dominican Republic. In 2001, Peña formed his first group, a boy band called Alofoque for Latino teens in Boston, and a record label with the same name.

Peña left for New York with no job, friends or real plan. A young producer, Nely “El Arma Secreta” was working with the top talent in Reggaeton, including Daddy Yankee and Don Omar. Before long Peña was working on songs with Zion, Rihanna, and Don Omar. Don Omar asked Richy to be part of his team, as Nely had moved to Miami.

An early success was the song “Calm My Nerves” by Don Omar. Don Omar set up collaborations with artists including Tony Dize, Las Moscas and a group from Venezuela called Chino y Nacho. He produced two songs for Chino y Nacho at that time, including one of their early hits, “Dentro de Mi” featuring Don Omar. In 2008 he set up a studio in downtown Boston, within view of the Statehouse.

Peña began plans for the first Boston Music Conference (BMC) in 2008, and in September of that year, they held the BMC. It brought together aspiring talent, A&Rs from major labels and artists including Lápiz Conciente and Sensato del Patio.

Chino y Nacho came to Boston at the end of 2008, writing the hit song Niña Bonita. Peña helped to get Chino y Nacho signed to Universal; it went to the top of the charts.

In 2010 Richy won a Grammy for “Niña Bonita”, and signed a co-publishing deal with Warner/Chappell Music. Peña also co-founded Rich Republic, a 360 music marketing company.

In 2013, Peña will be producing Somaya Reece's debut album.

== Awards and nominations ==
- Winner of the 2010 Latin Grammy for Best Urban Music Album (Chino y Nacho)
- Winner of the 2011 Premio Lo Nuestro for Best Tropical Album Mi Niña Bonita (Chino y Nacho)
- Nominated for 2011 Billboard Latin Pop Airplay Song of the Year
- Nominated for 2011 Billboard Tropical Airplay Song of the Year
- Nominated for 2011 Billboard Latin Rhythm Album of the Year
- Nominated for 2011 Billboard Latin Digital Download of the Year
- Winner of the 2011 BMI Citation of Achievement In Recognition of the Great National Popularity as Measured by Broadcast Performances Niña Bonita
- Powermeter Award for Being One of the 100 Most Influential Latinos 2011,2012
- Entrepreneurial Spirit Award by Boston Latino TV
- Editor's Pick for Best Independent Music Conference by El Planeta Newspaper

In 2012 Richy was selected as a Power User by Image-Line the company that creates the FL Studio software which Richy uses to produce his records.
