= Niña Bonita (song) =

"Mi Niña Bonita"

Single by Chino & Nacho

from the album Mi Niña Bonita
- Released: April 13, 2009
- Genre: Merengue
- Length: 3:39
- Label: Machete Music; Universal Music Latino
- Songwriters: Jesús Alberto Miranda Perez; Miguel Ignacio Mendoza
- Producer: Richy Peña

Chino & Nacho singles chronology
"Me Mata, Me Mata" (2008)	"Mi Niña Bonita" (2009)	"Se Apagó La Llama" (2009)

Mi Niña Bonita (English: My Pretty Girl) is the single by Chino & Nacho. It is off the album, with the same name, Mi Niña Bonita. This song has two music videos, an original Latin American version and a U.S. version. The official remix features Puerto Rican duo Angel & Khriz.

== Music video ==
The original music video is in a high school. It involves a love interest with Nacho and a girl. The other version is set mainly in a radio station. Both have the hand gesture of the song. Both can be found in Chino & Nacho's VEVO page on YouTube.

== Versions and Remixes ==
=== Versions ===
- Mi Niña Bonita (Original Version)
- Mi Niña Bonita (US Version)

=== Remixes ===
- Mi Niña Bonita (Urban Remix) (featuring Angel & Khriz)
- Mi Niña Bonita (Dance Remix)
- Mi Niña Bonita (Banda Remix) (featuring Dareyes de la Sierra)
- Mi Nina Bonita (DJ Tigerlily Remix) (featuring Calle da Cristiano Ronaldo 7)

== Charts ==
=== Weekly charts ===
Chart (2010)	Peak position
US Bubbling Under Hot 100 (Billboard)	4
US Hot Latin Songs (Billboard)	1
US Tropical Airplay (Billboard)	1

=== Year-end charts ===
Chart (2010)	Position
US Hot Latin Songs (Billboard)	5

== See also ==
- List of number-one Billboard Top Latin Songs of 2010
- List of number-one Billboard Hot Tropical Songs of 2010
- List of Billboard Latin Rhythm Airplay number ones of 2010
