= Ni Loca =

Single by Fanny Lu featuring Dalmata

from the album Felicidad y Perpetua
- Released: December 1, 2011
- Genre: Latin pop
- Length: 3:29
- Label: Universal Music Latino
- Songwriters: Wise Cruz, Fanny Lu, Andrés Munera

Fanny Lu singles chronology
"Fanfarrón" (2011)	"Ni Loca" (2011)	"Don Juan" (2012)

"'Ni Loca" (English: Not Even Crazy) is a Latin pop song by Colombian recording artist Fanny Lu, written and produced by herself, Wise Cruz and Andrés Munera, for her third studio album Felicidad y Perpetua. The song was released worldwide on December 1, 2011 as the second single from the album. The music video of the song is available in the different video platforms from March 13, 2012.

== Music video ==
On February 24, 2012 the singer published on her VEVO and YouTube channel the first teaser, while on March 6 of the same year released a second teaser which confirmed that the musical video would be released on March 13. Finally the video was released that day. As of December 16, 2012, the video has reached 2.87 million views on YouTube.

== Track listing ==
- Digital download
1. "Ni Loca (feat. Dalmata)" - 3:29

== Charts ==
=== Weekly charts ===
Chart (2012)	Peak position
Mexico (Billboard Mexican Airplay)	44
Venezuela (Record Report)	1

=== Year-end charts ===
Chart (2012)	Peak position
Venezuela (Record Report)	37
