= No Te Pido Flores =

Single by Fanny Lu

from the album Lágrimas Cálidas
- Released: February 2006
- Genre: Tropipop, vallenato
- Length: 4:03
- Label: Universal Music Latino
- Songwriter: José Gaviria

Fanny Lu singles chronology
"No Te Pido Flores" (2006)	"Te Arrepentirás" (2006)

Audio sample
- "No Te Pido Flores": file; help

No Te Pido Flores ("I'm Not Asking You For Flowers") is the debut song by Colombian singer Fanny Lu on her first studio album Lágrimas Cálidas (2006). The song received a Billboard Music Latin nomination for "Tropical Airplay of the Year" and a Latin Grammy nomination for "Best Tropical Song".

== Song information ==
The song was written by the Colombian producer José Gaviria, who defined to Fanny Lu as the only female voice with success within the so-called Tropipop scene. "No Te Pido Flores" is a mix of tropical rhythms with vallenato and Latin pop. The lyrics deal with heartbreak and disappointment over a previous relationship. In the chorus: "No te pido que traigas flores/ Tampoco que me des bombones/ Yo solo quiero una caricia/ Que me digas que tu me quieres." ("I'm not asking you to bring me flowers/ Nor to give me sweets/ I just want a caress/ That you tell me how much you love me.") she sings about how love is about actions and not gifts, and Lu has decided to forget her previous lover because her heart now has a "price" and an "owner."

== Music video ==
=== First version ===
The first music video was shot in Lake Guatavita (some 16 km from Bogotá); this lagoon was the same one that gave rise to the famous legend of El Dorado. The director of the video was Mauricio Pardo and the recording of the music video lasted for 22 hours of continuous work. It was shot with murky visuals similar to bleach bypass. The video shows Fanny Lu on a canoe, likewise surrounded by flowers and with an accordionist that accompanies her when she sings the chorus. Interspersed with this are shots of Fanny Lu on a table, as well as swimming on her back holding flowers, and even, at one point near the end of the video, trashing bottles that are on the table, as well as throwing a bottle with a flower back into the lagoon, tying the video to the themes of the song. This is the better known of the videos.

=== International version ===
The music video has a second version that was shot in the Plaza Moreno on the city of La Plata, Argentina. The director for this version was Mauricio Pardo as well. Fanny released the music video on her VEVO and YouTube channel on 16 June 2009 when she created her VEVO account, though the video was played on-and-off internationally on channels like Telefutura (now UniMás). The video starts with Fanny Lu singing in a boring city with a black raincoat and after when the chorus starts, the people take off their black clothes and begin to dance the tropical rhythm of the song. At the end of the music video, a man comes to ask forgiveness to Fanny and suddenly appears a little girl in a bike that removes his clothes and leaves him naked; Fanny Lu laughs at him. As of 3 May 2013 the video has reached 5.92 million views on YouTube.

== Track listing ==
- Album version
1. "No Te Pido Flores" – 4:04

== Charts ==
Chart (2007)	Peak position
US Hot Latin Songs (Billboard)	16
US Latin Pop Airplay (Billboard)	14
US Tropical Airplay (Billboard)	1

== See also ==
- List of number-one Billboard Hot Tropical Songs of 2007
