= Celos (song) =

1983 song by Daniela Romo

Single by Daniela Romo

from the album Daniela Romo
- Released: 1983
- Genre: Latin pop
- Length: 3:09
- Label: EMI Music
- Songwriter: José Luis Perales

"Celos" ("Jealousy") is a song by Mexican singer-songwriter Daniela Romo. It was released in 1983 as the third single from her self-titled album.

== Background ==
Mexican singer Daniela Romo released her self-titled second studio album with the lead single "Mentiras" ("Lies") in 1983 which became Romo's first number-one single in Mexico. "Celos" was released as the third single from the album and also topped the charts in the country for 32 weeks. It was awarded a Gold certification by the Asociación Mexicana de Productores de Fonogramas y Videogramas.

== Fanny Lu version ==
"Celos"

Single by Fanny Lu

from the album Dos
- Released: August 17, 2009
- Genre: Latin pop
- Length: 2:54
- Label: Universal Music Latino
- Songwriter: José Luis Perales

Fanny Lu singles chronology
"Tú No Eres Para Mi" (2008)	"Celos" (2009)	"Corazón Perdido" (2009)

In 2009, Colombian singer Fanny Lu recorded a cover version of the song, which was included on her second studio album Dos.

=== Charts ===
Chart (2009)	Peak position
US Hot Latin Songs (Billboard)	21
US Latin Pop Airplay (Billboard)	10
US Tropical Airplay (Billboard)	37

== See also ==
- List of number-one hits of 1983 (Mexico)
