= Tú No Eres Para Mi =

"Tu No Eres Para Mi"

Single by Fanny Lu

from the album Dos
- Released: October 10, 2008
- Recorded: June 12, 2008
- Genre: Latin pop
- Length: 3:25
- Label: Universal Music Latino
- Songwriters: José Gaviria, Fanny Lu, Andrés Munera

Fanny Lu singles chronology
"Y Si Te Digo" (2007)	"Tu No Eres Para Mi" (2008)	"Celos" (2009)

"Tu No Eres Para Mi" (English: You Are Not Right For Me) is a Latin pop song by Colombian recording artist Fanny Lu. It is the first single from her second studio album Dos, released December 8, 2008. The song's music video became available on Fanny Lu's VEVO on June 16, 2009.

== Song information ==
The song was written and produced by Fanny Lu, José Gaviria and Andrés Munera. It includes guitar and accordion solos. The lyrics describe a failing romantic relationship, in which the singer describes how she previously loved her man, but he was dishonest with her. As a result, she decides to break him up, admitting that they are not for each other.

== Music video ==
The video shows scenes of Fanny Lu with some friends using vodun to curse the man that hurt her. Throughout the video, the man is seen with a bouquet of flowers, watching and trying to talk with the women that he finds, but the women won't allow him to. In the end of the video, he knocks on her door with the ruined bouquet in his hand, trying to reconcile with her, but she closes the door on him. The music video premiered on YouTube on December 10, 2008.

== Track listing ==
- Digital remix EP
1. "Tu No Eres Para Mi" (Album version) — 3:28
2. "Tu No Eres Para Mi" (Video version) — 3:40
3. "Tu No Eres Para Mi" (Babyfunk remix) — 4:58
4. "Tu No Eres Para Mi" (Angel & Khriz mashup) — 3:27
5. "Tu No Eres Para Mi" (George Figares Remix) — 3:45

== Personnel ==
- Fanny Lu – lead vocals, producer, audio production
- Andrés Múnera – producer, guitar, audio recording, recording
- José Gaviria – producer, audio production, background vocals
- John Lozano – accordion, background vocals
- Lee Levin – drums
- Javier Olivencia – saxophone
- Catalina Rodríguez – background vocals

== Charts ==
=== Weekly charts ===
Chart (2009)	Peak position
Colombia (EFE)	3
Mexico (Monitor Latino)	3
Panama(EFE)	5
US Bubbling Under Hot 100 (Billboard)	6
US Hot Latin Songs (Billboard)	1
US Latin Pop Airplay (Billboard)	1
US Radio Songs (Billboard)	75
Venezuela (Record Report)	12

=== Year-end charts ===
Chart (2009)	Position
US Hot Latin Songs (Billboard)	13

== See also ==
- List of number-one Billboard Hot Latin Songs of 2009
- List of number-one Billboard Hot Latin Pop Airplay of 2009
