= Y Si Te Digo =

Single by Fanny Lu

from the album Lágrimas Cálidas
- Released: November 6, 2007
- Genre: Latin pop
- Length: 3:57
- Label: Universal Music Latino
- Songwriter: José Gaviria

Fanny Lu singles chronology
"Te Arrepentirás" (2006)	"Y Si Te Digo" (2007)	"Tú No Eres Para Mi" (2008)

Audio sample
- "Y Si Te Digo": file; help

"Y Si Te Digo" (What If I Say to You) is the second single by Colombian recording artist Fanny Lu. It was written and produced by José Gaviria and Andrés Munera, for her debut album. The song was released digitally on November 6, 2007. It was later included on the compilation album Bachata Romántica: 1's (2009).

== Track listing ==
- Y Si Te Digo (Album version)
1. "Y Si Te Digo" - 4:33
- Y Si Te Digo - EP
1. "Y Si Te Digo" - 3:41
2. "Y Si Te Digo (Radio Version)" - 3:57
3. "Y Si Te Digo (featuring. Eddy Herrera)" - 3:41
4. "No Te Pido Flores" - 4:04
- Bachata Romántica: 1's
1. "Y Si Te Digo (featuring. Toby Love)" - 4:07

== Charts ==
=== Weekly charts ===
Chart (2007)	Peak position
US Bubbling Under Hot 100 Singles	19
US Hot Latin Songs (Billboard)	1
US Latin Pop Airplay (Billboard)	5
US Tropical Airplay (Billboard)	1

=== Year-end charts ===
Chart (2007)	Position
US Latin Songs	50
US Latin Pop Songs	31

== See also ==
- List of number-one Billboard Hot Latin Songs of 2007
