= Chino & Nacho =

Venezuelan pop duo

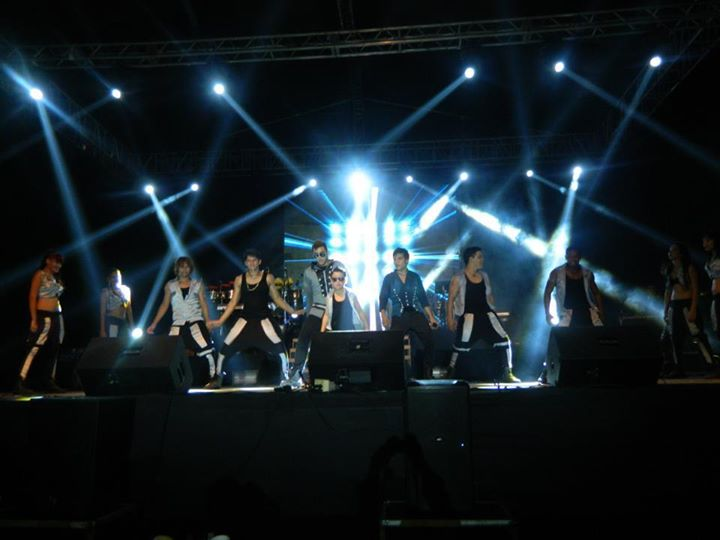

Background information
- Origin: Caracas, Venezuela
- Genres: Música tropical; Latin pop; merengue; reggaeton
- Years active: 2007– 2017; 2021-present
- Labels: Mackediches; Machete
- Members: Jesús Alberto Miranda Pérez; Miguel Ignacio Mendoza Donatti
- Website: chinoynacho.com.ve

Chino & Nacho is a Venezuelan pop duo, consisting of Jesús Alberto Miranda Pérez (Chino) (born November 15, 1984) and Miguel Ignacio Mendoza Donatti (Nacho) (born August 22, 1983). In 2010, the group won a Latin Grammy for Best Urban Album for Mi Niña Bonita.

== History ==
Before forming a duo, Chino and Nacho were both part of the Venezuelan merengue boy band Calle Ciega alongside Luifer, Gabo Marquez and Emilio Vizcaino where they started their musical careers. They released five albums, with the hit single, "Mi Cachorrita" on Una Vez Más. Calle Ciega gained significant airplay in Venezuela and surrounding countries. The group fought for having more publicity than other Venezuelan groups like 3 Dueños.

Calle Ciega employed various musical genres, though most reggaeton, and liked to mix salsa and merengue with reggaeton. The group later stopped releasing singles, and eventually broke up into what is now Chino & Nacho and Los Cadilacs. Chino & Nacho debuted their first album nationwide in 2008, circulating in Venezuela and neighboring countries.

Their first album, named Época de Reyes, was released in 2008 and made available in many Latin American countries. They released five albums in total – Época de Reyes, Mi Niña Bonita, Mi Niña Bonita: Reloaded, Supremo and Radio Universo.

They won Pepsi Venezuela Music Awards for Artist of the Year, Album of the Year, and Song of the Year in 2012, for Video of the Year in 2013, for Theme of the Year in 2015, and for Artist of the Year, Tropical Fusion Artist of the Year, and Theme of the Year in 2017.

Amid rumors, the duo announced their breakup on February 24, 2017, citing solo careers and different musical tastes.

In March 2020, after several days of rumours on social media, the duo reconciled and announced their return to music, as well as the release of "Raro" on March 13, 2020, their first single in three years following their break-up.

== Discography ==
- Época de Reyes (2008)
- Mi Niña Bonita (2010)
- Mi Niña Bonita: Reloaded (2010)
- Supremo (2011)
- Radio Universo (2015)
- Chino & Nacho Is Back (2021)
- Radio Venezuela (2026)

== Awards and nominations ==
Award	Year	Recipient(s) and nominee(s)	Category	Result
ASCAP Latin Awards	2016	"Andas en Mi Cabeza"	Latin Urban Song of the Year	Won
Billboard Latin Music Awards	2011	Themselves	Latin Artist of the Year, New	Nominated
Billboard Latin Music Awards	2011	Themselves	Latin Pop Airplay Artist of the Year, Duo or Group	Nominated
Billboard Latin Music Awards	2011	Themselves	Tropical Airplay Artist of the Year, Duo or Group	Nominated
Billboard Latin Music Awards	2011	Themselves	Latin Rhythm Airplay Artist of the Year, Duo or Group	Nominated
Billboard Latin Music Awards	2011	Themselves	Latin Rhythm Albums Artist of the Year, Duo or Group	Nominated
Billboard Latin Music Awards	2011	"Niña Bonita"	Tropical Airplay Song of the Year	Nominated
Billboard Latin Music Awards	2011	"Niña Bonita"	Latin Pop Airplay Song of the Year	Nominated
Billboard Latin Music Awards	2011	"Niña Bonita"	Latin Digital Download of the Year	Nominated
Billboard Latin Music Awards	2011	Mi Niña Bonita	Latin Rhythm Album of the Year	Nominated
Billboard Latin Music Awards	2013	Themselves	Tropical Songs Artist of the Year, Duo or Group	Won
Billboard Latin Music Awards	2014	Themselves	Latin Pop Songs Artist of the Year, Duo or Group	Won
Billboard Latin Music Awards	2014	Themselves	Tropical Songs Artist of the Year, Duo or Group	Won
Billboard Latin Music Awards	2015	Themselves	Tropical Songs Artist of the Year, Duo or Group	Won
Billboard Latin Music Awards	2016	Themselves	Latin Pop Songs Artist of the Year, Duo or Group	Nominated
Billboard Latin Music Awards	2017	Themselves	Latin Pop Songs Artist of the Year, Duo or Group	Nominated
Billboard Latin Music Awards	2017	"Andas en Mi Cabeza"	Latin Pop Song of the Year	Nominated
