= Fanny Lu =

Colombian singer and actress

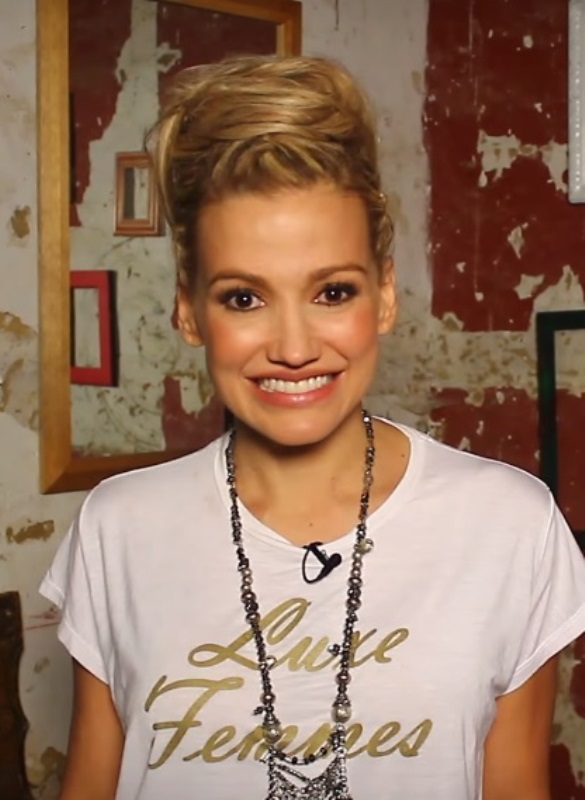
- Fanny Lu performing on La Voz Colombia in 2013

Background information
- Born: Fanny Lucía Martínez Buenaventura; 8 February 1973 (age 53)
- Origin: Santiago de Cali, Valle del Cauca, Colombia
- Genres: Latin pop; Tropipop
- Occupations: Singer; songwriter; actress
- Years active: 1997–present (as an actress); 2005–present (as a singer)
- Labels: Universal Latin; Sony; eOne
- Website: www.fannylu.com

Fanny Lucía Martínez Buenaventura (born 8 February 1973), better known professionally as Fanny Lu, is a Colombian singer, songwriter, and actress from Santiago de Cali, Colombia. She studied at the University of the Andes and received a degree in industrial engineering. She is the mother of two children, Mateo and Valentina.

Fanny Lu's first job in the entertainment industry was in Colombia, as a hostess to a music magazine called Siempre Música. She then moved on to radio voice in the principal radio stations from her country. However, she wasn't recognized until 1998, when she made part of the cast of the Colombian soap opera Perro Amor.

In 2006, Fanny Lu released Lágrimas Cálidas, winning fame in Colombia and some countries from Latin America, with her two singles that reached the top of the Latin charts. Her 2008 album Dos consolidated her music career, giving her credibility as an artist. Her single "Tú No Eres Para Mi" was number one in several countries. She released her third album, Felicidad y Perpetua in November 2011. Her humanitarian work granted her to be named "Goodwill Ambassador" from the FAO.

== Early and personal life ==
Fanny Lu was born in Santiago de Cali, Colombia to Colombian parents. She attended Colegio Bolivar before moving to France to finish her primary education. After returning to Latin America, she studied at the University of the Andes, where she graduated with a degree in industrial engineering. She is the mother of two children. In 2009, she filed for divorce.

== Acting career ==
In 1994, Fanny Lu became a TV presenter on the popular show Locomotora. Afterward, she went into the music industry. She has appeared in many television series such as, Perro Amor and Más Vale Tarde. She also voices Beth in the Spanish version of the Sony Pictures animated film, Open Season (Amigos Salvajes). In 2012, in the second season of Pequeños Gigante's reality show, she was chosen as a replacement judge.

== Music career ==
Lu's debut album, Lágrimas Cálidas was released in 2006. The album spent five weeks at No. 1. The lead single "No Te Pido Flores" also spent seven weeks at No. 1 on the Hot 100 Billboard charts in Latin America, Colombia, Peru, Venezuela, and Mexico. In the U.S., the song peaked at No. 16 on the Billboard Hot Latin Songs and No. 1 on the Billboard Tropical Songs chart. The second single from her debut album, "Y Si Te Digo", peaked at No. 1 on the Billboard Hot Latin Tracks chart.

Her second album, Dos, was number one in its first week in Colombia. Dos was released the following week in the United States and Puerto Rico on 16 December. The lead single, "Tú No Eres Para Mi", was the No. 1 song played on the radio for 12 weeks. This single also peaked at No. 1 on the Billboard Hot Latin Tracks in April 2009. On 16 October 2009, Lu was nominated as Goodwill Ambassador of the Food and Agriculture Organization of the United Nations.

In 2010, Fanny Lu was chosen to record the Spanish version of the theme song, "Something That I Want", ("Algo Quiero") for the Disney film Tangled.

She released the first single, "Fanfarrón", from her third studio album, Felicidad y Perpetua. The second single is "Ni Loca".

== Filmography ==
Film
Year	Title	Role	Notes
2006	Open Season (2006 film)	Beth	Latin American Spanish (Dub)
2008	Sopa Norteña	Unknown role	Minor role
2010	Paulina and Friends	Herself	Television film
2018	The Grinch	Donna	Latin American Spanish (Dub)

Television
Year	Title	Role	Notes
1998	Hermosa niña	Bianca	Lead Role
1998	Perro Amor	Ana María Brando	Lead Role
2000	Pobre Pablo	Silvanna	Lead Role
2000	La Caponera	Unknown role	Lead Role
2008	Más Vale Tarde	Herself	(1 episode)
2012	Pequeños Gigantes	Herself	Judge
2012	La Voz Colombia	Herself	Coach
2013	11-11 In my Block nothing Blocks	Danna	Invited
2013	La Voz Colombia	Herself	Coach
2014	La Voz Kids Colombia	Herself	Coach
2015	La Voz Kids Colombia	Herself	Coach
2020	¡Mira Quién Baila!	Herself	Participant

== Discography ==
- Lágrimas Cálidas (2006)
- Dos (2008)
- Felicidad y Perpetua (2011)

== Awards and nominations ==
Fanny Lu was nominated for two Lo Nuestro Awards. The ceremony took place on 21 February 2008, and aired on Univisión. She was nominated for Female Artist of the Year and Artist of the year under the Tropical-genre categories. In 2009, she was once again nominated for Female Artist of the Year under the Tropical-genre category.

Lu received six Latin Billboard Music Award nominations in 2008, including Tropical Album of the Year and Tropical New Artist Album of the Year for her album "Lagrimas Calidas" as well as Tropical Airplay Song of the Year and Tropical Airplay New Artist Song of the Year - categories that her singles "No Te Pido Flores" and "Y Si Te Digo" share together. The awards aired on Telemundo in April 2007. She went on to win the award for Tropical Airplay New Artist Song of the Year for her song "Y Si Te Digo".

=== Premios Nuestra Tierra ===
A Premio Nuestra Tierra is an accolade that recognize outstanding achievement in the Colombian music industry. Fanny Lu has received four nominations.

Year	Nominee / work	Award	Result
2014	Herself	Best Tropical Solo Artist or Group	Nominated
2014	Herself	Tweeter of the Year	Nominated

== See also ==
- Music of Colombia
