= 2011 Latin Billboard Music Awards =

Annual American music awards ceremony

2011 Billboard Latin Music Awards
- Date: April 28, 2011
- Venue: BankUnited Center, University of Miami, Coral Gables, Florida
- Hosted by: Aylin Mujica, Rafael Amaya and Daniel Sarcos

The 2011 Billboard Latin Music Awards were held on Thursday April 28, 2011 at the BankUnited Center at the University of Miami in Coral Gables, Florida. It is produced and broadcast lived on Telemundo network. The nominees were announced on Thursday February 10, 2011.

== Performers ==
- Enrique Iglesias featuring Wisin & Yandel — "No Me Digas Que No / Tonight (I'm Lovin' You)"
- Lucero — "Esta Vez La Primera Soy Yo"
- Cristian Castro and José José — "Lo Pasado, Pasado"
- Banda el Recodo — "Dime Que Me Quieres"
- Juanes — "Regalito"
- Dyland & Lenny featuring Arcángel — "Caliente"
- Chino & Nacho — "Niña Bonita"
- Camila — "Entre Tus Alas"
- Fidel Rueda — "Me Encantaria"
- Roberto Tapia — "Me Duele"
- Gloria Trevi — "Me Río de Ti"
- Don Omar and Lucenzo — "Danza Kuduro" and "Taboo"
- Emmanuel — La Chica de Humo"
- Luis Fonsi — "Gritar"
- Maná — "Lluvia al Corazón"
- Marc Anthony — "A Quien Quiero Mentirle"
- Jencarlos Canela featuring Pitbull — "Mi Corazón Insiste / Tu Cuerpo"
- Pitbull featuring T-Pain — Bon, Bon / Hey Baby (Drop It to the Floor)"

== Presenters ==
- Ximena Navarrete
- Daddy Yankee
- Tercer Cielo
- María Celeste Arrarás
- Gaby Espino
- Angélica María
- Conjunto Primavera
- Christian Daniel
- Sophia Del Carmen
- Vicente Garcia
- Max Santos
- Lenny Santos
- Carmen Villalobos
- Daniel Sarcos
- Rafael Amaya
- Andrés Cantor
- Lena
- R.K.M & Ken-Y
- Gabriel Porras
- Catherine Siachoque
- Maritza Rodríguez
- Miguel Varoni
- Natalia Jiménez
- Alexis & Fido
- Carmen Dominicci
- Arthur Hanlon
- Melina León
- Frankie J
- Crash Barrera
- Yarel
- Ana Isabelle
- Joey Montana
- Enrique Acevedo
- Penélope Menchaca
- Cristina Urgel
- Banda Los Recoditos

== Special awards ==
=== Lifetime achievement award ===
- Emmanuel

=== Spirit of Hope Award ===
- Gloria Estefan

=== Your World Award (Premio Tu Mundo) ===
- Aventura

== Awards ==
=== Artists ===
==== Artist of the Year ====
- Aventura
- Camila
- Enrique Iglesias
- Shakira

==== Artist of the Year, New ====
- Banda Los Recoditos
- Chino & Nacho
- Prince Royce
- Voz de Mando

==== Hot Latin Song of the Year ====
- Banda el Recodo — "Dime Que Me Quieres"
- Enrique Iglesias featuring Juan Luis Guerra — "Cuando Me Enamoro"
- La Arrolladora Banda El Limón — "Nina de Mi Corazon"
- La Original Banda El Limón — "Al Menos"

==== Hot Latin Song of the Year, Vocal Event ====
- Don Omar and Lucenzo — "Danza Kuduro"
- Enrique Iglesias featuring Juan Luis Guerra — "Cuando Me Enamoro"
- Enrique Iglesias featuring Pitbull — "I Like It"
- Shakira featuring Dizzee Rascal and El Cata — "Loca"

==== Hot Latin Songs Artist of the Year, Male ====
- Daddy Yankee
- Enrique Iglesias
- Larry Hernandez
- Prince Royce

==== Hot Latin Songs Artist of the Year, Female ====
- Ivy Queen
- Lady Gaga
- Shakira
- Thalia

==== Hot Latin Songs Artist of the Year, Duo or Group ====
- Aventura
- Banda el Recodo
- Camila
- La Arrolladora Banda El Limón

==== Hot Latin Songs Label of the Year ====
- Disa
- Fonovisa
- Sony Music Latin
- Universal Music Latino

==== Crossover Artist of the Year ====
- Lady Gaga
- Rihanna
- Taio Cruz
- Usher

=== Top Latin Albums ===
==== Latin Album of the Year ====
- Camila — Dejarte de Amar
- Enrique Iglesias — Euphoria
- Marc Anthony — Iconos
- Shakira — Sale el Sol

==== Top Latin Albums Artist of the Year, Male ====
- Enrique Iglesias
- Larry Hernandez
- Marc Anthony
- Prince Royce

==== Top Latin Albums Artist of the Year, Female ====
- Ivy Queen
- Jenni Rivera
- Shakira
- Thalia

==== Top Latin Albums Artist of the Year, Duo or Group ====
- Aventura
- Camila
- El Trono De Mexico
- Wisin & Yandel

==== Top Latin Albums Label of the Year ====
- Capitol Latin
- Sony Music Latin
- Universal Music Latin Entertainment
- Warner Music Latina

=== Latin Pop ===
==== Latin Pop Airplay Song of the Year ====
- Camila — Aléjate de mi
- Camila — Mientes
- Chino & Nacho — Mi Niña Bonita
- Enrique Iglesias featuring Juan Luis Guerra — Cuando Me Enamoro

==== Latin Pop Airplay Artist of the Year, Solo ====
- Chayanne
- Enrique Iglesias
- Juan Luis Guerra
- Shakira

==== Latin Pop Airplay Artist of the Year, Duo or Group ====
- Aventura
- Camila
- Chino & Nacho
- Wisin & Yandel

==== Latin Pop Airplay Label of the Year ====
- Capitol Latin
- Sony Music Latin
- Universal Music Latino
- Warner Music Latina

==== Latin Pop Album of the Year ====
- Camila — Dejarte de Amar
- Enrique Iglesias — Euphoria
- Marc Anthony — Iconos
- Shakira — Sale el Sol

==== Latin Pop Albums Artist of the Year, Solo ====
- Chayanne
- Enrique Iglesias
- Marc Anthony
- Shakira

==== Latin Pop Albums Artist of the Year, Duo or Group ====
- Camila
- Cultura Profética
- Hillsong
- Tercer Cielo

==== Latin Pop Albums Label of the Year ====
- Bullseye
- Sony Music Latin
- Universal Music Latin Entertainment
- Warner Music Latina

=== Tropical ===
==== Tropical Airplay Song of the Year ====
- Aventura — El Malo
- Chino & Nacho — Niña Bonita
- Enrique Iglesias featuring Juan Luis Guerra — Cuando Me Enamoro
- Juan Luis Guerra — Bachata en Fukuoka

==== Tropical Airplay Artist of the Year, Solo ====
- Daddy Yankee
- Juan Luis Guerra
- Prince Royce
- Tito El Bambino

==== Tropical Airplay Artist of the Year, Duo or Group ====
- Aventura
- Chino & Nacho
- Jowell & Randy
- Wisin & Yandel

==== Tropical Airplay Label of the Year ====
- Premium Latin
- Sony Music Latin
- Top Stop Music
- Universal Music Latino

==== Tropical Album of the Year ====
- El Gran Combo de Puerto Rico — Sin Salsa No Hay Paraiso
- El Gran Combo de Puerto Rico — Salsa: Un Homenaje A El Gran Combo
- Juan Luis Guerra — A Son de Guerra
- Prince Royce — Prince Royce

==== Tropical Albums Artist of the Year, Solo ====
- Gilberto Santa Rosa
- Hector Acosta
- Juan Luis Guerra
- Prince Royce

==== Tropical Albums Artist of the Year, Duo or Group ====
- 24 Horas
- Aventura
- El Gran Combo de Puerto Rico
- Spanish Harlem Orchestra

==== Tropical Albums Label of the Year ====
- Capitol Latin
- Popular
- Sony Music Latin
- Universal Music Latin Entertainment

=== Regional Mexican ===
==== Regional Mexican Song of the Year ====
- Banda el Recodo — Dime Que Me Quieres
- Banda Los Recoditos — Ando Bien Pedo
- El Trono de Mexico — Te Recordare
- La Original Banda El Limón — Al Menos

==== Regional Mexican Airplay Artist of the Year, Solo ====
- Espinoza Paz
- Gerardo Ortíz
- Larry Hernandez
- Pedro Fernández

==== Regional Mexican Airplay Artist of the Year, Duo or Group ====
- Banda el Recodo
- Banda Los Recoditos
- El Trono de Mexico
- La Arrolladora Banda El Limón

==== Regional Mexican Airplay Label of the Year ====
- ASL
- Disa Records
- Fonovisa Records
- Musivisa

==== Regional Mexican Album of the Year ====
- El Trono de Mexico — Quiero Decirte Que Te Amo
- The Chieftains — San Patricio
- Jenni Rivera — La Gran Señora
- Pedro Fernández — Amarte a la Antigua

==== Regional Mexican Albums Artist of the Year, Solo ====
- Espinoza Paz
- Jenni Rivera
- Larry Hernandez
- Pedro Fernández

==== Regional Mexican Albums Artist of the Year, Duo or Group ====
- Banda Los Recoditos
- El Trono de Mexico
- Los Inquietos del Norte
- Pesado

==== Regional Mexican Albums Label of the Year ====
- Concord Records
- Eagle Music
- Sony Music Latin
- Universal Music Latin Entertainment

=== Latin Rhythm ===
==== Latin Rhythm Airplay Song of the Year ====
- Daddy Yankee — La Despedida"
- Don Omar and Lucenzo — Danza Kuduro
- Pitbull — Bon, Bon
- Tito El Bambino — Te Pido Perdón

==== Latin Rhythm Airplay Artist of the Year, Solo ====
- Daddy Yankee
- Don Omar
- Pitbull
- Tito El Bambino

==== Latin Rhythm Airplay Artist of the Year, Duo or Group ====
- Chino & Nacho
- Dyland & Lenny
- Wisin & Yandel
- Zion & Lennox

==== Latin Rhythm Airplay Label of the Year ====
- Pina Records
- Siente
- Sony Music Latin
- Universal Music Latin Entertainment

==== Latin Rhythm Album of the Year ====
- Chino & Nacho — Niña Bonita
- Daddy Yankee — Mundial
- Don Omar — Don Omar Presents: Meet the Orphans
- Pitbull — Armando

==== Latin Rhythm Albums Artist of the Year, Solo ====
- Daddy Yankee
- Don Omar
- Pitbull
- Tito El Bambino

==== Latin Rhythm Albums Artist of the Year, Duo or Group ====
- Chino & Nacho
- Jowell & Randy
- R.K.M & Ken-Y
- Wisin & Yandel

==== Latin Rhythm Albums Label of the Year ====
- Capitol Latin
- Chosen Few Emerald
- Sony Music Latin
- Universal Music Latin Entertainment

=== Latin Touring ===
==== Latin Touring Artist of the Year ====
- Alejandro Sanz
- Chayanne
- Marc Anthony
- Shakira

=== Digital ===
==== Latin Digital Album of the Year ====
- Camila — Dejarte de Amar
- Enrique Iglesias — Euphoria
- Marc Anthony — Iconos
- Shakira — Sale el Sol

==== Latin Digital Download of the Year ====
- Chino & Nacho — Mi Nina Bonita
- Pitbull — Bon, Bon
- Shakira — Waka Waka (This Time For Africa)
- Shakira featuring El Cata — Loca

==== Latin Social Artist of the Year ====
- Don Omar
- Enrique Iglesias
- Pitbull
- Shakira

=== Songwriters/Publishers/Producers ===
==== Songwriter of the Year ====
- Anthony Santos
- Horacio Palencia Cisneros
- Espinoza Paz
- Daddy Yankee

==== Publisher of the Year ====
- Arpa Musical, LLC, BMI
- EMI Blackwood Music Inc., ASCAP
- Premium Latin Publishing, ASCAP
- Sony/ATV Discos Music Publishing LLC, ASCAP

==== Publishing Corporation of the Year ====
- Arpa Music
- EMI Music
- Sony/ATV Music
- Universal Music

==== Producer of the Year ====
- Alfonso Lizarraga
- Carlos Paucar
- Fernando Camacho Tirado
- Joel Lizarraga

== See also ==
- Billboard Latin Music Awards
- Billboard Music Award
