= Euphoria Tour (Enrique Iglesias) =

2011–12 concert tour by Enrique Iglesias

- Tour by Enrique Iglesias
- Promotional poster for the tour
- Associated album: Euphoria
- Start date: January 29, 2011
- End date: July 6, 2012
- Legs: 8
- No. of shows: 53 in North America; 22 in Europe; 2 in Asia; 5 in South America; 4 in Australia; 86 Total

Enrique Iglesias concert chronology
- Greatest Hits Tour (2009); Euphoria Tour (2011–12); Enrique Iglesias & Jennifer Lopez Tour (2012)

The Euphoria Tour was the ninth headlining concert tour by the Spanish recording artist Enrique Iglesias. The tour supported his ninth studio album, Euphoria (2010). Beginning in January 2011, Iglesias performed in the Americas, Europe, Asia, and Australia. It is estimated that the tour will have been seen by a total of 1,312,579 viewers

The tour ranked 38th in Pollstar's "Top 50 Worldwide Tour (Mid-Year)", earning roughly 20 million dollars. At the conclusion of 2011, the tour placed 23rd on Billboard's annual, "Top 25 Tours", earning over $30 million with 38 shows. Iglesias also won an award for Touring Artist of the Year for Euphoria World Tour at Billboard Latin Music Awards of 2012.

== Background ==
Iglesias mentioned touring at an interview with ESPN, during the 2010 FIFA World Cup. Iglesias headed on a promotional tour for his album, performing in several music festivals in the United States including: KFRC's "Triple Ho Show", KMXV's "Jingle Jam" and KIIS-FM's Jingle Ball. The tour was officially announced via Iglesias website, only showing a few dates in France and England. Additional tour dates were added in North America, with the tour commencing in San Juan, Puerto Rico on January 29, 2011. While on tour, Iglesias was asked to be a judge on the U.S. version of The X Factor, however, he was unable to change his touring schedule to accommodate the show.

=== Femme Fatale Tour controversy ===
After completing the first leg of the tour, many media outlets rumored Iglesias joining Britney Spears on a co-headlining tour in the United States. When Spears officially announced her tour on Good Morning America, she stated Iglesias would join her. Within several hours, the singer's management released a statement stating Iglesias will not be joining Spears and will continue his solo tour. Although it was explained to be "strictly business", many media outlets speculated as to why Iglesias left the tour. Celebrity news site TMZ.com speculated the singer did not want to join Spears due to the controversies surrounding her previous tour. MTV News reported Iglesias dropped out after being advertised as Spears' opening act. Us Weekly followed with "inside sources" stating the deal was not complete and Iglesias did not need the promotion.

Iglesias took to Twitter to respond to all the rumors. He wrote:

"Hey guys, sorry for the confusion regarding a possible tour in the summer with Britney Spears. We are on the Euphoria tour and will continue to do so including some soon-to-be-announced dates in US. So hope to see all of you soon"

The singer would later remark his decision to not join Spears was because he felt everything was "rushed" and he was not fully convinced at the time. He continued to say he has respect for Spears as an artist and the possible tour would have been great for him and the fans. After completing the European leg of his tour, Iglesias announced a second North American leg with Pitbull and Prince Royce. Concerts in Europe, South America and Australia were announced as well. To introduce the tour, Iglesias stated, "I’m so excited to go out in the states, and this time with my good friends Pitbull and Prince Royce. It's going to be a great show and we hope to see all of you out there. This tour will be unforgettable!"

== Critical response ==
For his 2011 tour, Iglesias received numerous positive reviews from music critics and fans. Critics applauded the singer for his showmanship on stage and his connection with the audience. Kristyn Lyncheski (The Setonian) praises the singer on his connection to his audience at Madison Square Garden. She further explains, "Iglesias seemed humbled to be on stage at MSG, the place he said he considered the greatest venue. He repeatedly told the audience, 'You don't know how good I feel'. Iglesias said he was grateful for the fans that have stuck by him since his debut in 1995." Basem Boshra (Montreal Gazette) writes Igelsias performance at the Bell Centre was nothing short of charismatic. He continues, "Iglesias has always struck me as someone who has a sense of humour about his sex-symbol status, and that was most definitely on display last night, particularly when he pulled a young woman onstage to dance … and hug … and kiss … and, when she demured, to firmly plant her hands on his butt."

As his tour progressed to the United Kingdom & Ireland, the reviews continued to constructive. Andrew Johnston (The Belfast Telegraph) notes Iglesias' ability to drive his audience wild. He adds, "Tonight (I’m Lovin’ You), with ‘loving’ changed to something coarser, and his between-song demands for his audience to 'get dirty' made this a decidedly over-18 affair." Gordon Barr (Evening Chronicle) thought highly of Iglesias' performance at the Metro Radio Arena versus his previous shows in England. He further states, "He was in the crowd within minutes, and the banter never relented throughout, with two Traceys being picked from the audience for some memorable moments on stage with their own pop Hero." For the same concert, Aranda Rahbarkouhi (The Journal) shared the same feelings as Johnston. She writes, "Looking around, the screaming was coming from the back of the arena. Enrique appeared on a small stage engulfed in fans where he sang Hero before returning to the main stage for 'Escape' before relenting to the endless chants for more, signing off with a reprise of 'Tonight'."

For his concert at the Manchester Evening News Arena, Dianne Bourne (City Life) gave the performance five out of five stars. She explains, "And it's a testament to Enrique's broad appeal that among the fans he hauls up on stage are a silver-haired maths teacher called Jeremy, who hilariously duets on 'No Me Digas Que No'; gobsmacked Manc housewife Anna, who can't quite believe she's got Enrique on her lap; and then later, for one of the highlights of the show, quivering 14-year-old Jenny for a tender serenade of his biggest hit, 'Hero'." Dave Simpson (The Guardian) thought differently then Bourne, giving the same concert two out of five stars. He says, "At one point, the 32-year old hauls elderly audience members on stage, seemingly purely to humiliate them. A grey-haired schoolteacher who insists he doesn't drink is plied with rum, while an equally embarrassed lady is told: 'Think of me when you're having sex tonight.' When Iglesias discovers she's out without her husband, he suggests to the schoolteacher: 'Fuck her.'"

== Opening acts ==
- Lemar (United Kingdom & Ireland, March 2011)
- Pitbull (Australia) (North America, September–November 2011)
- Havana Brown (Australia)
- Prince Royce (North America, September–November 2011)
- Nayer (North America, September–November 2011)
- Jay Sean (Los Angeles, New York City, February 2011)
- Mohombi (Windsor, Montreal)
- Jim Bakkum (Rotterdam)
- Shy'm (Nice, Paris)
- Stan Van Samang (Hasselt)
- Anna Abreu (Turku, Helsinki)
- Sofia Nizharadze (Batumi)
- Eldrine (Batumi)
- Fanny Lú (Mexicali)

== Setlist ==
Spanish
1. "Tonight (I'm Lovin' You)"
2. "Heartbeat"
3. "Nunca te olvidaré"
4. "No Me Digas Que No"
5. "Rhythm Divine"
6. "Bailamos"
7. "Por amarte"
8. "Experiencia religiosa"
9. "Lloro por tí"
10. "Cuando Me Enamoro"
11. "Be with You"
12. "Dímelo"

Encore

13. "Hero"
14. "Escape"
15. "I Like It"
English
1. "Tonight (I'm Lovin' You)"
2. "Heartbeat"
3. "Rhythm Divine"
4. "Bailamos"
5. "Ring My Bells"
6. "Can You Hear Me"
7. "Stand by Me"
8. "Not in Love"
9. "Be with You"
10. "Tired of Being Sorry"
11. "Do You Know? (The Ping Pong Song)"
12. "Takin' Back My Love"

Encore

13. "Hero"
14. "Escape"
15. "I Like It"
16. "Tonight (I'm Lovin' You)" (Reprise)

Notes

- "No Me Digas Que No" and "I Like It" was performed with Wisin & Yandel and Pitbull respectively on January 29, 2011, in Puerto Rico, on the start of the Euphoria Tour and on October 21, 2011, in Miami.
- "¿Dónde Están Corazón?" was performed in lieu of "Experiencia Religiosa" in New York City, Miami, and Atlantic City.
- "Coming Home" was performed in lieu of "Ring My Bells" in Dublin.
- "Lloro por tí" was performed in lieu of "Can You Hear Me" in Dublin.
- "Solo en ti" was performed in lieu of "Can You Hear Me" in England.
- In Paris, Iglesias briefly performed "Purple Rain".

== Tour dates ==
Date	City	Country	Venue
North America
January 29, 2011	San Juan	Puerto Rico	José Miguel Agrelot Coliseum
February 3, 2011	Ledyard	United States	MGM Grand Theater
February 5, 2011	New York City	United States	Madison Square Garden
February 10, 2011	Hollywood	United States	Hard Rock Live
February 12, 2011	Atlantic City	United States	Borgata Event Center
February 16, 2011	Windsor	Canada	The Colosseum at Caesars Windsor
February 17, 2011	Montreal	Canada	Bell Centre
February 19, 2011	Los Angeles	United States	Gibson Amphitheatre
February 23, 2011	Monterrey	Mexico	Auditorio Banamex
February 25, 2011	Zapopan	Mexico	Auditorio Telmex
February 26, 2011	Zapopan	Mexico	Auditorio Telmex
February 28, 2011	Mexico City	Mexico	Auditorio Nacional
March 1, 2011	Mexico City	Mexico	Auditorio Nacional
March 2, 2011	Mexico City	Mexico	Auditorio Nacional
Europe
March 18, 2011	Dublin	Ireland	The O_{2}
March 19, 2011	Belfast	Ireland	Odyssey Arena
March 21, 2011	Newcastle	England	Metro Radio Arena
March 24, 2011	Manchester	England	Manchester Evening News Arena
March 25, 2011	London	England	The O_{2} Arena
March 26, 2011	Birmingham	England	LG Arena
March 28, 2011	Rotterdam	Netherlands	Sportpaleis
March 31, 2011	Nice	France	Palais Nikaïa
April 2, 2011	Paris	France	Zénith de Paris
April 3, 2011	Hasselt	Belgium	Ethias Arena
April 6, 2011	Turku	Finland	HK Areena
April 7, 2011	Helsinki	Finland	Hartwall Areena
April 11, 2011	Saint Petersburg	Russia	Ice Palace
April 13, 2011	Moscow	Russia	Olimpiyskiy
Asia
June 1, 2011	Tel Aviv	Israel	Nokia Arena
Europe
June 6, 2011	Esch-sur-Alzette	Luxembourg	Rockhal
June 8, 2011	Nottingham	UK	Capital FM Arena
June 10, 2011	Cardiff	UK	Motorpoint Arena Cardiff
June 11, 2011	Glasgow	UK	SECC Concert Hall 4
June 12, 2011^{[A]}	London	UK	Wembley Stadium
North America
June 23, 2011	Guatemala City	Guatemala	Fórum Mundo E
June 25, 2011	Panama City	Panama	Figali Convention Center
South America
June 28, 2011	Guayaquil	Ecuador	Explanada del C.C.G.
June 30, 2011	Quito	Ecuador	Estadio Olímpico Atahualpa
July 2, 2011	La Paz	Bolivia	Estadio Hernando Siles
July 5, 2011	Santa Cruz	Bolivia	Estadio Ramón Tahuichi Aguilera
July 7, 2011	Caracas	Venezuela	Terraza del C.C.C.T.
North America
July 9, 2011	Tegucigalpa	Honduras	Nacional de Ingenieros Coliseum
Australia
July 23, 2011	Sydney	Australia	Acer Arena
July 25, 2011	Brisbane	Australia	Brisbane Entertainment Centre
July 27, 2011	Melbourne	Australia	Rod Laver Arena
July 28, 2011	Melbourne	Australia	Rod Laver Arena
Europe
August 2, 2011^{[B]}	Batumi	Georgia	Europe Square
North America
September 22, 2011	Boston	United States	TD Garden
September 23, 2011	Atlantic City	United States	Etess Arena
September 24, 2011	Newark	United States	Prudential Center
September 27, 2011	Fairfax	United States	Patriot Center
September 29, 2011	Toronto	Canada	Air Canada Centre
September 30, 2011	Auburn Hills	United States	The Palace of Auburn Hills
October 1, 2011	Rosemont	United States	Allstate Arena
October 3, 2011	Kansas City	United States	Sprint Center
October 6, 2011	Los Angeles	United States	Staples Center
October 7, 2011	San Jose	United States	HP Pavilion
October 8, 2011	Summerlin	United States	Red Rock Amphitheatre
October 12, 2011	Houston	United States	Toyota Center
October 13, 2011	San Antonio	United States	AT&T Center
October 15, 2011	El Paso	United States	Don Haskins Center
October 16, 2011	Laredo	United States	Laredo Energy Arena
October 18, 2011	Grand Prairie	United States	Verizon Theatre
October 20, 2011	Duluth	United States	The Arena at Gwinnett Center
October 21, 2011	Orlando	United States	Amway Center
October 22, 2011	Miami	United States	American Airlines Arena
November 4, 2011	New York City	United States	Madison Square Garden
February 22, 2012^{[C]}	Veracruz	Mexico	Macro Plaza del Malecón
March 6, 2012^{[D]}	Houston	United States	Reliant Stadium
March 10, 2012	Cancún	Mexico	Moon Palace Resort Grounds
March 17, 2012^{[E]}	Guatemala City	Guatemala	Estadio Cementos Progreso
March 28, 2012	Zapopan	Mexico	Auditorio Telmex
March 29, 2012	Mexico City	Mexico	Palacio de los Deportes
April 19, 2012	Mérida	Mexico	Centro de Espectáculos Jardín Carta Clara
April 20, 2012	Puebla	Mexico	Estadio de Béisbol Hermanos Serdán
April 26, 2012	Querétaro	Mexico	Estadio Corregidora
April 27, 2012	Mexicali	Mexico	Estadio Casas GEO
Europe
May 4, 2012	Madrid	Spain	Palacio de Deportes
North America
May 11, 2012	Aguascalientes	Mexico	Plaza de Toros Monumental
May 18, 2012^{[F]}	Rosemont	United States	Allstate Arena
May 19, 2012^{[G]}	Mansfield	United States	Comcast Center
May 20, 2012^{[H]}	Holmdel Township	United States	PNC Bank Arts Center
May 22, 2012^{[I]}	Philadelphia	United States	Wells Fargo Center
June 30, 2012^{[J]}	Miami Beach	United States	Fontainebleau Round Pool
Asia
July 4, 2012	Beirut	Lebanon	Beirut Waterfront
Europe
July 6, 2012^{[K]}	Monte Carlo	Monaco	Salle des Étoiles

Festivals and other miscellaneous performances
^{A} This concert was a part of "Summertime Ball"
^{B} This concert was a part of "MTV Live Georgia"
^{C} This concert was a part of the "Carnaval de Veracruz"
^{D} This concert was a part of the "Houston Livestock Show and Rodeo"
^{E} This concert was a part of the "Tigo Music Fest"
^{F} This concert was a part of WKSC-FM's "Fantabuloso"
^{G} This concert was a part of WXKS-FM's "Kiss 108 Concert"
^{H} This concert was a part of WKTU's "KTUphoria"
^{I} This concert was a part of WIOQ's "Springle Ball"
^{J} This concert was a part of WHYI-FM's "Ultimate Pool Party"
^{K} This concert was a part of the "Monte-Carlo Sporting Summer Festival"

Cancellations and rescheduled shows

May 30, 2011	Bogotá, Colombia	Centro Comercial Outlet Bima	Cancelled
May 31, 2011	Tel Aviv, Israel	Nokia Arena	Rescheduled to June 1, 2011

=== Box office score data ===
Venue	City	Tickets sold / available	Gross revenue
José Miguel Agrelot Coliseum	San Juan	13,320 / 13,320 (100%)	$897,644
Madison Square Garden	New York City	13,199 / 13,199 (100%)	$1,319,807
Hard Rock Live	Hollywood	4,528 / 4,528 (100%)	$502,200
Bell Centre	Montreal	7,807 / 7,860 (99%)	$622,960
Gibson Amphitheatre	Los Angeles	6,000 / 6,000 (100%)	$539,928
Auditorio Telmex	Zapopan	24,405 / 27,095 (87%)	$1,641,058
Auditorio Nacional	Mexico City	28,455 / 28,455 (100%)	$1,701,230
The O_{2}	Dublin	5,814 / 7,000 (83%)	$482,572
Odyssey Arena	Belfast	7,209 / 7,209 (100%)	$478,494
Manchester Evening News Arena	Manchester	12,523 / 13,750 (91%)	$952,154
The O_{2} Arena	London	15,336 / 15,700 (98%)	$1,198,030
Acer Arena	Sydney	12,674 / 13,027 (97%)	$1,902,800
Brisbane Entertainment Centre	Queensland	5,571 / 5,571 (100%)	$683,432
Rod Laver Arena	Melbourne	19,076 / 19,076 (100%)	$2,718,970
TD Garden	Boston	12,267 / 12,267 (100%)	$603,196
Etess Arena	Atlantic City	3,775 / 3,775 (100%)	$280,712
Prudential Center	Newark	14,131 / 14,131 (100%)	$1,077,999
Patriot Center	Fairfax	8,047 / 8,047 (100%)	$550,408
Air Canada Centre	Toronto	12,970 / 12,970 (100%)	$981,367
The Palace of Auburn Hills	Auburn Hills	10,868 / 10,868 (100%)	$563,548
Allstate Arena	Rosemont	14,787 / 14,787 (100%)	$1,011,807
Sprint Center	Kansas City	9,825 / 9,825 (100%)	$527,773
Staples Center	Los Angeles	15,432 / 15,432 (100%)	$1,285,617
HP Pavilion at San Jose	San Jose	14,336 / 14,336 (100%)	$855,263
Red Rock Amphitheatre	Summerlin	7,316 / 7,316 (100%)	$629,880
Toyota Center	Houston	13,885 / 13,885 (100%)	$891,622
AT&T Center	San Antonio	14,301 / 14,301 (100%)	$778,346
Don Haskins Center	El Paso	8,340 / 8,340 (100%)	$580,881
Laredo Energy Arena	Laredo	9,512 / 9,512 (100%)	$518,191
Verizon Theatre	Grand Prairie	6,271 / 6,271 (100%)	$588,423
The Arena at Gwinnett Center	Duluth	10,926 / 10,926 (100%)	$727,523
Amway Center	Orlando	13,807 / 13,807 (100%)	$704,844
American Airlines Arena	Miami	14,445 / 14,445 (100%)	$1,160,877
Palacio de los Deportes	Mexico City	10,511 / 14,498 (72%)	$718,817
TOTAL		415,844 / 425,704(98%)	$32,048,986

== Awards and nominations ==
Year	Ceremony	Category	Result
2011	MTV Europe Music Awards	Best World Stage Performance	Nominated
2011	Univision Best of Music	Best Tour	Nominated
2011	Premios Juventud	The Super Tour	Nominated
2012	Premios Juventud	The Super Tour	Won
2012	Latin Billboard Music Awards	Latin Tour	Won
