= List of number-one Billboard Tropical Songs of 2010 =

The Billboard Tropical Songs is a chart that ranks the best-performing tropical songs of the United States. Published by Billboard magazine, the data are compiled by Nielsen Broadcast Data Systems based on each single's weekly airplay.

== Chart history ==
Issue date	Song	Artist(s)	Reference(s)
January 2	"Dile al Amor"	Aventura	
January 9	"Dile al Amor"	Aventura	
January 16	"Dile al Amor"	Aventura	
January 23	"Dile al Amor"	Aventura	
January 30	"Dile al Amor"	Aventura	
February 6	"Se Me Va la Voz"	Alejandro Fernández	
February 13	"Dile al Amor"	Aventura	
February 20	"Dile al Amor"	Aventura	
February 27	"Dile al Amor"	Aventura	
March 6	"Dile al Amor"	Aventura	
March 13	"Dile al Amor"	Aventura	
March 20	"Dile al Amor"	Aventura	
March 27	"Dile al Amor"	Aventura	
April 3	"Dile al Amor"	Aventura	
April 10	"Dile al Amor"	Aventura	
April 17	"Intentalo"	J'Martin featuring Magic Juan	
April 24	"Niña Bonita"	Chino & Nacho	
May 1	"Dile al Amor"	Aventura	
May 8	"Niña Bonita"	Chino & Nacho	
May 15	"Niña Bonita"	Chino & Nacho	
May 22	"Estupida"	La India	
May 29	"Estupida"	La India	
June 5	"Bachata en Fukuoka"	Juan Luis Guerra	
June 12	"Bachata en Fukuoka"	Juan Luis Guerra	
June 19	"Bachata en Fukuoka"	Juan Luis Guerra	
June 26	"Bachata en Fukuoka"	Juan Luis Guerra	
July 3	"Bachata en Fukuoka"	Juan Luis Guerra	
July 10	"Bachata en Fukuoka"	Juan Luis Guerra	
July 17	"Bachata en Fukuoka"	Juan Luis Guerra	
July 24	"Bachata en Fukuoka"	Juan Luis Guerra	
July 31	"Vivir Sin Ti"	Gilberto Santa Rosa	
August 7	"24 Horas"	24 Hrs	
August 14	"Stand by Me"	Prince Royce	
August 21	"Niña Bonita"	Chino & Nacho	
August 28	"El Malo"	Aventura	
September 4	"El Malo"	Aventura	
September 11	"Cuando Me Enamoro"	Enrique Iglesias featuring Juan Luis Guerra	
September 18	"Cuando Me Enamoro"	Enrique Iglesias featuring Juan Luis Guerra	
September 25	"Cuando Me Enamoro"	Enrique Iglesias featuring Juan Luis Guerra	
October 2	"Cuando Me Enamoro"	Enrique Iglesias featuring Juan Luis Guerra	
October 9	"Cuando Me Enamoro"	Enrique Iglesias featuring Juan Luis Guerra	
October 16	"Cuando Me Enamoro"	Enrique Iglesias featuring Juan Luis Guerra	
October 23	"Corazón Sin Cara"	Prince Royce	
October 30	"Corazón Sin Cara"	Prince Royce	
November 6	"Loca"	Shakira featuring El Cata	
November 13	"Danza Kuduro"	Don Omar & Lucenzo	
November 20	"Danza Kuduro"	Don Omar & Lucenzo	
November 27	"Danza Kuduro"	Don Omar & Lucenzo	
December 4	"Danza Kuduro"	Don Omar & Lucenzo	
December 11	"Danza Kuduro"	Don Omar & Lucenzo	
December 18	"Danza Kuduro"	Don Omar & Lucenzo	
December 25	"Danza Kuduro"	Don Omar & Lucenzo	

== See also ==
- List of number-one Billboard Tropical Albums of 2010
- List of number-one Billboard Top Latin Songs of 2010
- List of number-one Billboard Hot Latin Pop Airplay of 2010
