= Ayer (Enrique Iglesias song) =

Single by Enrique Iglesias

from the album Euphoria
- Released: 5 July 2011
- Recorded: 2010, South Point Studios, (Miami, Florida)
- Genre: Latin pop
- Length: 3:33
- Label: Universal Republic, Universal Latino
- Songwriters: Enrique Iglesias, Descemer Bueno
- Producer: Carlos Paucar

Enrique Iglesias singles chronology
"Dirty Dancer" (2011)	"Ayer" (2011)	"I Like How It Feels" (2011)

"Ayer" (English: "Yesterday") is a song by Spanish recording artist Enrique Iglesias taken from his first Bilingual album Euphoria. The song was released as the third Spanish single and seventh overall single from the album. It was produced by Enrique's longtime collaborator Carlos Paucar. It was released on 5 July 2011 as digital download. "Ayer" was written by Enrique Iglesias and Descemer Bueno.

== Music video ==
The music video for the song was directed by Evan Winter. It premiered through his official website and YouTube channel on 29 July 2011. In the "Ayer" video, Iglesias is pictured in a dark room illuminated by candlelight. As the video continues, Iglesias’ broken heart causes the stark room to go up in flames. The room starts to fill up with smoke as furniture burns behind Iglesias, however, the singer is so focused that he does not seem to notice. Meena Rupani from Desihits wrote "The video for 'Ayer' is simple and soulful and it's what made us fall in love with Enrique in the first place.". It was nominated for Best Male Video at 2011 Premios Fuse TV.

== Chart performance ==
On the week of 28 September 2011, "Ayer" debuted on No. 38 on the Billboard Latin Pop Songs chart. It marks Enrique's 30th entry into this chart since his debut single "Si Tú Te Vas" in 1995. It is also the third consecutive single to chart from his first Bilingual album Euphoria following singles "Cuando Me Enamoro" and "No Me Digas Que No" both of which topped the chart. After 5 weeks since its debut, the single broke into top 10 at no. 8. Since then, it has managed to peak up to #3. It debuted on US Latin Songs chart at No. 40 on the week of 4 October 2011. It marks his 32nd entry into the chart. After 6 weeks from its debut, the single broke into top 10 at #10. Three weeks later it peaked to #3, its highest position yet. It also topped the US Tropical Songs chart in December 2011.

== Track listing ==
U.S. Digital download

1. "Ayer" – 3:33

U.S. Digital download - The Remixes

1. "Ayer" – 3:33
2. "Ayer" (Regional Mexican Version) (featuring Voz de Mando)
3. "Ayer" (Bachata Version) (featuring 24 Horas)
4. "Ayer" (Urban Version) (featuring J-King & Maximan)

== Charts ==
Chart (2011)	Peak position
US Latin Songs (Billboard)	3
US Latin Pop Songs (Billboard)	3
US Tropical Songs (Billboard)	1

Notes

- The chartings are for the single version except for Tropical Songs, where it is for the album version.

== Release history ==
Country	Date	Format	Label
United States	5 July 2011	Digital download	Universal Republic
