= Dirty Dancer =

2011 Single by Enrique Iglesias and Usher featuring Lil Wayne

Single by Enrique Iglesias and Usher featuring Lil Wayne

from the album Euphoria and Versus EP
- Released: 9 May 2011
- Recorded: 2010, South Point Studios, (Miami, Florida)
- Genre: Dance-pop
- Length: 3:34 (album version); 4:05 (single version feat. Lil Wayne)
- Label: Universal Republic; Universal Latino
- Songwriters: Enrique Iglesias; Nadir Khayat; Evan Bogart; Erika Nuri; David Quiñones
- Producers: RedOne & Jimmy Joker

Enrique Iglesias singles chronology
"Tonight (I'm Lovin' You)" (2010)	"Dirty Dancer" (2011)	"Ayer" (2011)

Usher singles chronology
"More" (2010)	"Dirty Dancer" (2011)	"Promise" (2011)

Lil Wayne singles chronology
"Red Nation" (2011)	"Dirty Dancer" (2011)	"9 Piece" (2011)

"Dirty Dancer" is a song by Spanish singer Enrique Iglesias and American singer Usher, recorded for Iglesias' sixth studio album, Euphoria, and included on Usher's EP Versus. A remix of the song, which features American rapper Lil Wayne and American singer Nayer, was released on 9 May 2011 by Universal Music Group as the sixth single from Euphoria. Written by the two singers with Evan Bogart, Erika Nuri and David Quiñones and producer RedOne, "Dirty Dancer" is a dance-pop song.

The album version of "Dirty Dancer" appeared on the UK Singles Chart, the Dutch Single Top 100 and the Slovak Rádio – Top 100, while the single version entered the Australian Singles Chart, the New Zealand Singles Chart and the U.S. Billboard Hot 100. An Ethan Lader-directed music video for "Dirty Dancer" has the three artists watching holographic dancers in nightclubs. The single has already been certified Gold in Australia and USA. It was covered by the Dutch symphonic metal band Within Temptation as part of their weekly radio covers in promotion for their upcoming event, Elements and was included on their April 2013 cover album The Q-Music Sessions. The song samples parts of the 1995 song "Salva Mea" by Faithless.

== Background ==
"Dirty Dancer" was written by Enrique Iglesias, RedOne, Evan Bogart, Erika Nuri and David Quiñones, and was produced by RedOne. It was recorded at South Point Studios, Miami. "Dirty Dancer" is a dance-pop song with some influences of electropop and rave music. According to Adam Graham of MTV News, "Dirty Dancer" is about "a comely-yet-dangerous female"; its hook features the lyrics "She's a dirty, dirty dancer/ Dirty, dirty dancer/ Never ever lonely". At the beginning on the song, Usher dedicates it to "the dirty girls all around the world". Iglesias and Usher exchange verses before, on the single remix, Wayne gives his rap verse, which makes a reference to actor Eddie Murphy. "Dirty Dancer" was included on Iglesias' sixth studio album, Euphoria, and Usher's EP Versus. "Dirty Dancer" was sent to Australian contemporary hit radio (CHR) and nights radio on 9 May, while the single remix was sent to US CHR 10 May. The single was released as a music download in North America on 12 June 2011, and was released in Europe and Oceania on 19 June.

== Critical reception ==
Robert Copsey from Digital Spy and Allison Stewart from The Washington Post chose "Dirty Dancer" as one of the best tracks on Euphoria, with Stewart calling it "steamy". Prefix Magazine's Wilson McBee criticized Wayne's appearance on the track, and wrote that the line "Ain't no money like young money" was his "weakest last line ever".

== Chart performance ==
The album version of "Dirty Dancer" debuted at number 194 on the UK Singles Chart on 17 July 2010, and at number fifty-one on the Dutch Single Top 100, where it later peaked at number thirty-nine. The album version also entered the Slovak Rádio Top 100 Oficiálna at number ninety-four in May 2011, as well as appearing on the Belgian Ultratip charts of Flanders and Wallonia at numbers nine and thirty-six, respectively.

On 16 May 2011, the single version debuted on the Australian Singles Chart at number thirty-six, and on the Australian Dance Chart at number thirteen. It has since peaked at numbers twenty-four and nine, respectively. On the issue dated 28 May 2011, "Dirty Dancer" debuted at number nine on the U.S. Hot Digital Songs chart with 126,000 copies sold, and subsequently appeared at number eighteen on the Billboard Hot 100. The same day it entered the Canadian Hot 100 at number eighteen. On 4 June 2011, "Dirty Dancer" debuted at number thirty-three on the Pop Songs chart, and later peaked at number seventeen. "Dirty Dancer" entered the New Zealand Singles Chart at number twenty-two on 30 May 2011. On the Dutch Top 40, the song debuted at number thirty-one and peaked at number twenty-five, while on the UK Singles Chart, the single version of "Dirty Dancer" has reached number twenty-one. It entered the French Singles Chart at number ninety-nine on 11 June 2011.

On 20 August 2011, the song charted at #1 on the Billboard Hot Dance Club Songs making it his ninth #1 single on the chart. Inglesias was the only male artist in the chart's history to achieve this milestone, after beating previous record-holders Michael Jackson and Prince with his song "I Like It". It is his third consecutive #1 on this chart from his album Euphoria, following "I Like It" and "Tonight (I'm Fuckin' You)".

== Live performances ==
Enrique Iglesias first premiered "Dirty Dancer" live as part of a medley with "I Like It" that he performed on the tenth season of American Idol on 12 May 2011. For the performance, he wore blue jeans and a black leather jacket, which featured Usher and Lil Wayne appearing on video screens behind backing vocalists and a band. Initially, Iglesias was under a lone spotlight, before several green lasers beams lit the stage.

== Music video ==
The music video for "Dirty Dancer" was co-directed by Yasha Malekzad, Jeff Dotson & Ethan Lader and premiered on 22 June 2011. It opens by showing a city during the night, before transitioning to Iglesias inside a futuristic strip club, where he is watching a holographic pole dancer performing a gymnastic routine in a black latex outfit. Usher is shown dressed in black clothing and singing alone in a dark room. Throughout the video he alternates between reality and a hologram. Iglesias is shown in similar scenes, and at one point lowers his jacket to expose his blue luminous heart. Iglesias then presses buttons on a remote control and the dancer is replaced by another, dressed in silver, who is in turn replaced by a gold bikini-clad dancer. Wayne begins his verse while being projected onto a building, while other shots show him in a dark room, similar to those of Usher. The dancer whom Iglesias watches leans in to kiss him but is replaced by a holographic message reading "credit expired".

Sabrina Cognata of WNOW-FM wrote, "This video has everything. And I mean everything worth having." MTV Buzzworthy's Jenna Hally Rubenstein wrote, "If you want to be a baller, this video is how you do it." The video has been viewed over 137 million times. In France, following the controversy of its predecessor "Tonight (I'm Lovin' You)", which was banned for its sexual explicit and erotic content, the "Dirty Dancer" music video was immediately broadcast after 10 p.m. on some music channels with a warning Not advised to kids under 10 years old due to the suggestive content and the half-naked holographic pole dancers' appearance.

== Track listing ==
- U.S. digital download
1. "Dirty Dancer" (Single Version) (with Usher featuring Lil Wayne) – 4:05
2. "Dirty Dancer" (Music Video)
3. "Dirty Dancer" (Remix) (with Usher featuring Lil Wayne and Nayer) - 4:04
- German CD single / UK digital download
1. "Dirty Dancer" (Single Version) (with Usher featuring Lil Wayne) – 4:05
2. "Dirty Dancer" (with Usher) – 3:35

== Credits and personnel ==
Credits are adapted from the liner notes of "Dirty Dancer".

Recording

- Recorded at South Point Studios, Miami, Florida.

Personnel

- Enrique Iglesias – songwriter, vocals
- Nadir Khayat (RedOne) – songwriter, producer, instrumentation, programming, vocal editing
- Evan Bogart – songwriter
- Erika Nuri – songwriter
- David Quiñones – songwriter
- Carlos Paucar – vocal editing, recording, engineering
- Johnny "Sev" Severin – vocal editing
- Usher – vocals
- Lil Wayne – vocals

== Charts and certifications ==
=== Album version ===
Chart (2010–11)	Peak position
Belgium (Ultratop 50 Flanders)	32
Belgium (Ultratop 50 Wallonia)	25
Czech Republic Airplay (ČNS IFPI)	16
Denmark (Tracklisten)	37
Netherlands (Single Top 100)	39
Slovakia (IFPI)	2
Spain (Promusicae)	20
Sweden (Sverigetopplistan)	54
UK Singles (Official Charts Company)	194

=== Single remix ===
Chart (2011)	Peak position
Australia Dance (ARIA Charts)	9
Australia (ARIA)	24
Austria (Ö3 Austria Top 40)	14
Canada (Canadian Hot 100)	11
Canada CHR/Top 40 (Billboard)	9
Canada Hot AC (Billboard)	28
France (SNEP)	99
Germany (GfK)	17
Ireland (IRMA)	26
Mexico Airplay (Billboard)	49
Netherlands (Dutch Top 40)	25
New Zealand (Recorded Music NZ)	22
Romania (Romanian Top 100)	25
Russia Airplay (TopHit)	19
Scottish Singles Sales (Official Charts)	17
Switzerland (Schweizer Hitparade)	30
UK Hip Hop/R&B (Official Charts)	6
UK Singles (Official Charts)	21
Ukraine Airplay (TopHit)	59
US Billboard Hot 100	18
US Hot Dance Club Songs (Billboard)	1
US Pop Songs (Billboard)	17
US Rhythmic Airplay (Billboard)	32

=== Year-end charts ===
Chart (2011)	Position
Canada (Canadian Hot 100)	62
Romania (Romanian Top 100)	75
Russia Airplay (TopHit)	88
Ukraine Airplay (TopHit)	169
US Hot Dance Club Songs (Billboard)	7

=== Certifications ===
Region	Certification	Certified units/sales
Australia (ARIA)	Platinum	70,000^{^}
Canada (Music Canada)	2× Platinum	160,000^{*}
United States (RIAA)	Gold	500,000^{*}
^{*} Sales figures based on certification alone.^{^} Shipments figures based on certification alone.

== Release history ==
Country	Date	Format	Label
Australia	9 May 2011	Contemporary hit radio	Universal Music
United States	10 May 2011	Contemporary hit radio	Universal Republic
Canada	12 June 2011	Digital download	Universal Music
Mexico	12 June 2011	Digital download	Universal Music
United States	12 June 2011	Digital download	Universal Republic
Australia	19 June 2011	Digital download	Universal Music
Austria	19 June 2011	Digital download	Universal Music
Denmark	19 June 2011	Digital download	Universal Music
France	19 June 2011	Digital download	Universal Music
Germany	19 June 2011	Digital download	Universal Music
Netherlands	19 June 2011	Digital download	Universal Music
New Zealand	19 June 2011	Digital download	Universal Music
Norway	19 June 2011	Digital download	Universal Music
Sweden	19 June 2011	Digital download	Universal Music
Spain	19 June 2011	Digital download	Universal Music
United Kingdom	19 June 2011	Digital download	Polydor Records
Germany	22 July 2011	CD single	Universal Music

== See also ==
- List of number-one dance singles of 2011 (U.S.)
