= Euphoria Tour =

Euphoria Tour may refer to:

- Euphoria Tour, 1999–2000, Def Leppard's tour to support the Euphoria (Def Leppard album) release
- Euphoria Tour (Enrique Iglesias), 2011–2012
- Euphoria Tour (Usher), 2013 (cancelled)
