= Airtel (disambiguation) =

Airtel may refer to:

- Airtel (FBI), an outmoded FBI communication system
- Airtel Super Singer, an Indian television series.
- Bharti Airtel, an Indian multinational telecommunications company that operates in total 19 countries across South Asia, Africa and the Channel Islands, with related pages:
  - Airtel India, The second largest telecommunications network in India.
  - Airtel digital TV, The digital television services offered by airtel.
  - Airtel Payments Bank, a Payments bank exclusively for airtel users.
  - Airtel Africa, an Indian mobile network operator that operates in 16 African countries.
  - Airtel Bangladesh, an Indian mobile network operator in Bangladesh.
  - Airtel Sri Lanka, an Indian mobile network operator in Sri Lanka.
  - Airtel-Vodafone, an Indian mobile network operator in Channel Islands, UK.

== See also ==
- Aertel, a teletext service on Irish television
