= List of number-one Billboard Latin Pop Airplay songs of 2010 =

The Billboard Latin Pop Airplay chart ranks the best-performing Spanish-language pop music singles in the United States. Published by Billboard magazine, the data are compiled by Nielsen SoundScan based on each single's weekly airplay.

== Chart history ==
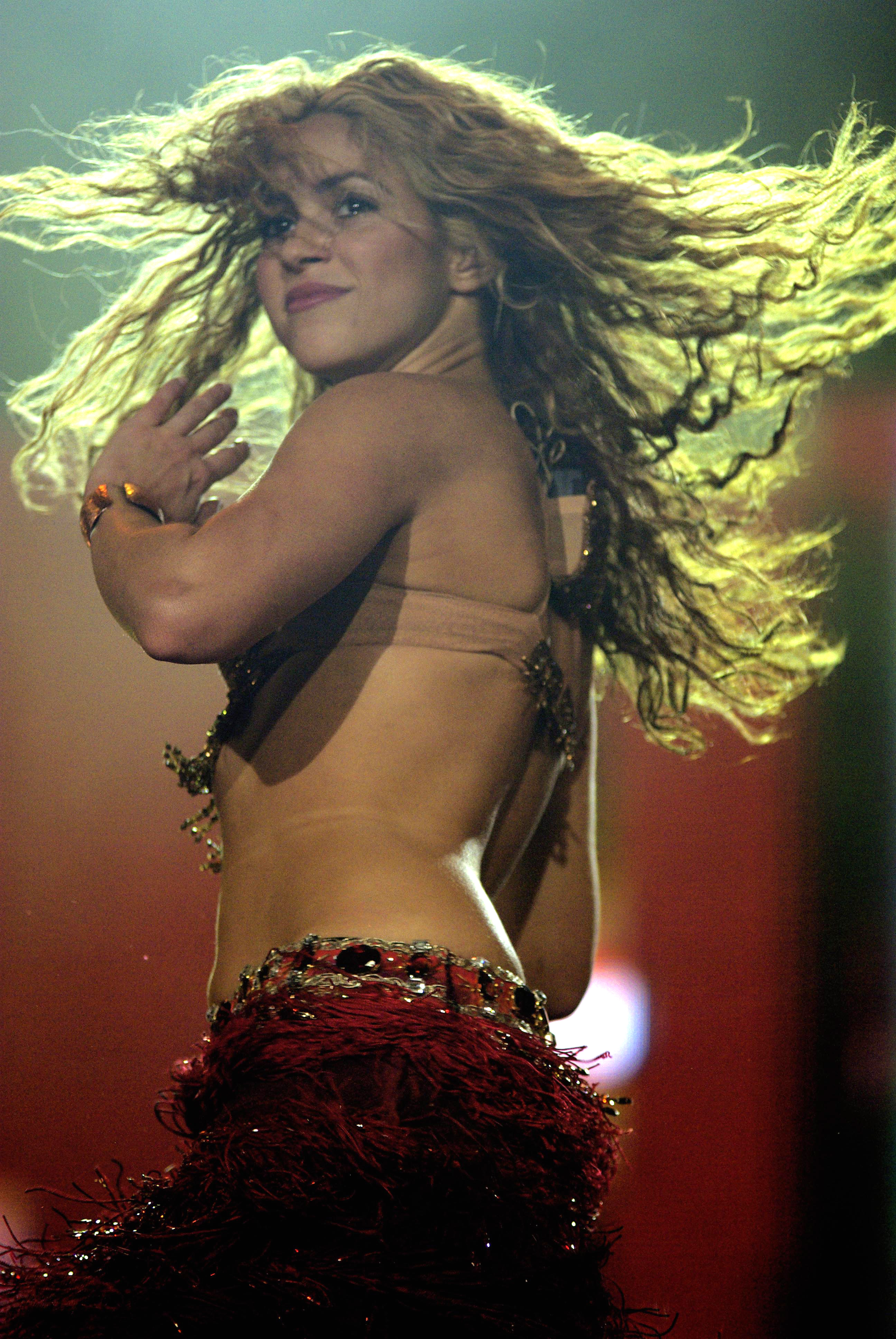
Colombian singer Shakira reached the top of the chart with her singles, "Lo Hecho Está Hecho", "Gitana" and "Loca", becoming the only artist in the chart, to tops the chart with three different singles.

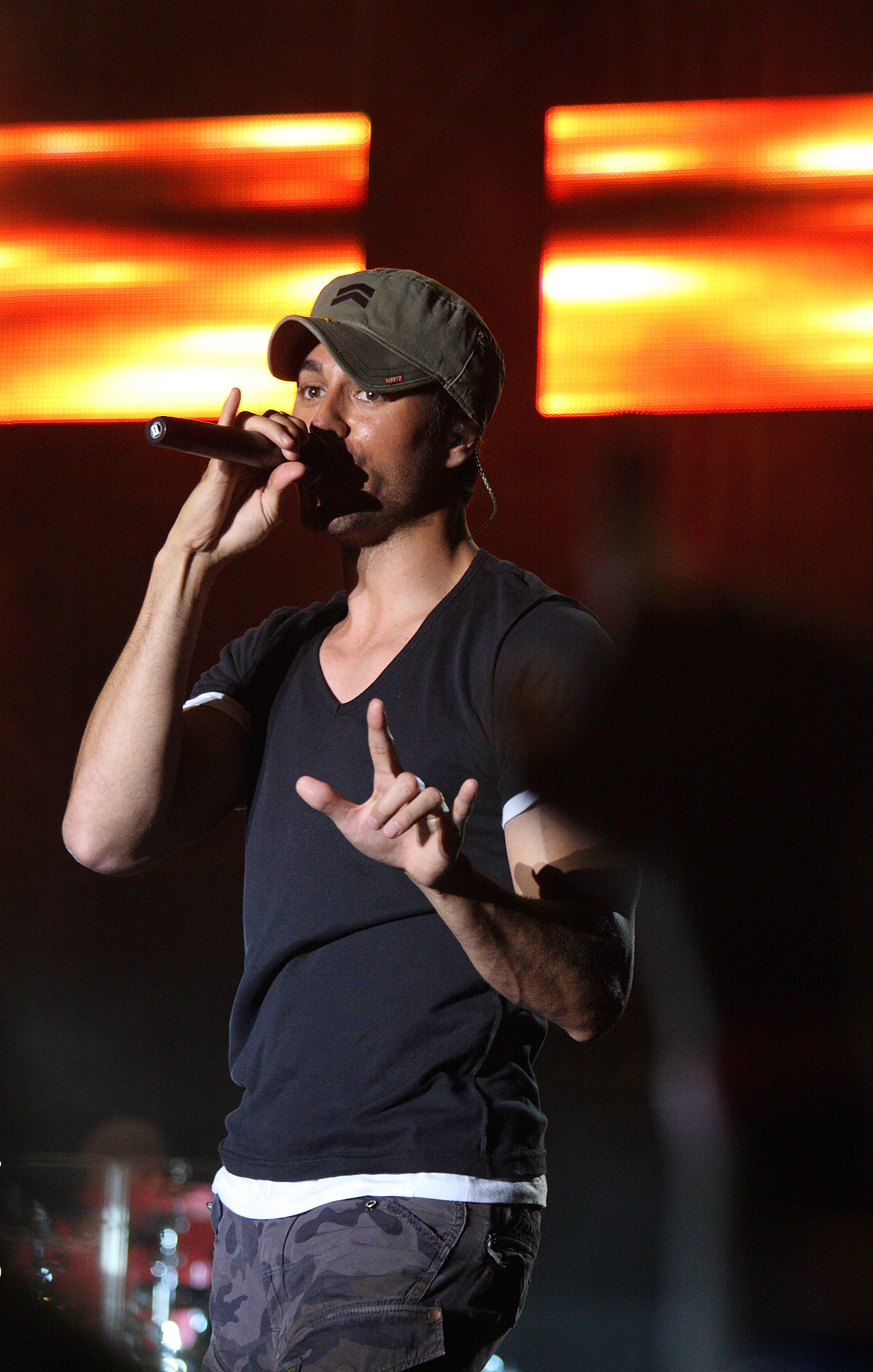
Spanish singer Enrique Iglesias remained at the top of the chart for a record 11 non-consecutive weeks with his single "Cuando Me Enamoro", back later his English single "I Like It", topped for 2 weeks, in general, Iglesias topped the chart for 13 weeks with his two singles.

Issue date	Song	Artist(s)	Ref.
January 2	"Looking for Paradise"	Alejandro Sanz featuring Alicia Keys	
January 9	"Looking for Paradise"	Alejandro Sanz featuring Alicia Keys	
January 16	"Se Me Va la Voz"	Alejandro Fernández	
January 23	"Se Me Va la Voz"	Alejandro Fernández	
January 30	"Lo Hecho Está Hecho"	Shakira	
February 6	"Se Me Va la Voz"	Alejandro Fernández	
February 13	"Colgando En Tus Manos"	Carlos Baute featuring Marta Sánchez	
February 20	"Colgando En Tus Manos"	Carlos Baute featuring Marta Sánchez	
February 27	"Mientes"	Camila	
March 6	"Mientes"	Camila	
March 13	"Mientes"	Camila	
March 20	"Mientes"	Camila	
March 27	"Mientes"	Camila	
April 3	"Mientes"	Camila	
April 10	"Mientes"	Camila	
April 17	"Mientes"	Camila	
April 24	"Mientes"	Camila	
May 1	"Mientes"	Camila	
May 8	"Gitana"	Shakira	
May 15	"Gitana"	Shakira	
May 22	"Gitana"	Shakira	
May 29	"Guapa"	Diego Torres	
June 5	"Bachata en Fukuoka"	Juan Luis Guerra	
June 12	"Bachata en Fukuoka"	Juan Luis Guerra	
June 19	"Cuando Me Enamoro"	Enrique Iglesias featuring Juan Luis Guerra	
June 26	"Cuando Me Enamoro"	Enrique Iglesias featuring Juan Luis Guerra	
July 3	"Cuando Me Enamoro"	Enrique Iglesias featuring Juan Luis Guerra	
July 10	"Cuando Me Enamoro"	Enrique Iglesias featuring Juan Luis Guerra	
July 17	"Cuando Me Enamoro"	Enrique Iglesias featuring Juan Luis Guerra	
July 24	"Cuando Me Enamoro"	Enrique Iglesias featuring Juan Luis Guerra	
July 31	"Cuando Me Enamoro"	Enrique Iglesias featuring Juan Luis Guerra	
August 7	"Cuando Me Enamoro"	Enrique Iglesias featuring Juan Luis Guerra	
August 14	"Aléjate de Mi"	Camila	
August 21	"Cuando Me Enamoro"	Enrique Iglesias featuring Juan Luis Guerra	
August 28	"Aléjate de Mi"	Camila	
September 4	"Aléjate de Mi"	Camila	
September 11	"Aléjate de Mi"	Camila	
September 18	"Aléjate de Mi"	Camila	
September 25	"Aléjate de Mi"	Camila	
October 2	"Aléjate de Mi"	Camila	
October 9	"Cuando Me Enamoro"	Enrique Iglesias featuring Juan Luis Guerra	
October 16	"Cuando Me Enamoro"	Enrique Iglesias featuring Juan Luis Guerra	
October 23	"I Like It"	Enrique Iglesias featuring Pitbull	
October 30	"I Like It"	Enrique Iglesias featuring Pitbull	
November 6	"Loca"	Shakira featuring El Cata	
November 13	"Loca"	Shakira featuring El Cata	
November 20	"Danza Kuduro"	Don Omar & Lucenzo	
November 27	"Danza Kuduro"	Don Omar & Lucenzo	
December 4	"Danza Kuduro"	Don Omar & Lucenzo	
December 11	"Loca"	Shakira featuring El Cata	
December 18	"Loca"	Shakira featuring El Cata	
December 25	"Lo Mejor De Mi Vida Eres Tú"	Ricky Martin featuring Natalia Jiménez	
