= Euphoria (Enrique Iglesias album) =

Studio album by Enrique Iglesias
- Released: 5 July 2010
- Recorded: 2009–2010
- Genres: Latin pop; dance-pop
- Length: 54:36
- Languages: English; Spanish
- Labels: Universal Republic; Universal Music Latino
- Producers: El Nasi; Fernando Garibay; La Mente Maestra; Carlos Paucar; RedOne; Lenny Medina; Mark Taylor

Enrique Iglesias chronology
Greatest Hits (2008)	Euphoria (2010)	Sex and Love (2014)

Singles from Euphoria
- 1. "Cuando Me Enamoro" Released: 26 April 2010; 2. "I Like It" Released: 3 May 2010; 3. "Heartbeat" Released: 8 June 2010; 4. "No Me Digas Que No" Released: 19 October 2010; 5. "Tonight (I'm Lovin' You)" Released: 22 November 2010; 6. "Dirty Dancer" Released: 9 May 2011; 7. "Ayer" Released: 5 July 2011

Euphoria is the ninth studio album by Spanish singer-songwriter Enrique Iglesias. The album is a joint-release by Universal Republic and Universal Music Latino and was released on 5 July 2010 internationally and in the US on 6 July 2010. The album features guest appearances by Akon, Usher, Juan Luis Guerra, Pitbull, Nicole Scherzinger, Puerto Rican reggaeton duo Wisin & Yandel and Ludacris. The album consists of songs in English, and Spanish.

The album spawned seven singles, three in Spanish and four in English. The album's first single "Cuando me enamoro" reached number-one on the Hot Latin Songs Chart, while the album's second single "I Like It", reached number four on the Billboard Hot 100. Upon its release, the album debuted at number ten on the Billboard 200, with sales of 27,000 copies. The album has produced three top Billboard Hot Dance Club Play tracks in the form of "I Like It", "Tonight (I'm Lovin' You)" and "Dirty Dancer". The album was nominated for Latin Grammy Award for Album of the Year and has won Billboard Music Award for Top Latin Album.

Together, the album and its singles have sold 1 million copies in the UK alone. It was certified 2× Platinum (Latin) in United States on 23 September 2011.

== Background ==
Euphoria is Iglesias' first bilingual album. He described the album by saying, "It's the first album I've ever released that's 50-50, [...] I thought that when it came down to it artistically, it would help me because it would put the Spanish songs against the English. I've created a little competition inside my head. I do not want to do a double album, and I've been writing this album for a year-and-a-half, [...] So I want to make sure it's the very best I can give fans." It was announced that at the end of 2010 Iglesias would set off on his Euphoria Tour in support of his latest album.

== Musical content ==
Iglesias stated that this album is different from his previous albums by saying, "To my 'religious experience', my first album is magic because I have a lot of care and because it has a level of honesty for me unique compared to what I've done. But when people hear this record is obvious that you will find that it has nothing to do with many of the songs I've done in the past, [...] What we want is that the audience grows with you and that is very difficult to achieve. That failing, you do it only occasionally. With these failures can be learned, but it is not easy." On the album's style "I Like It", he explained, that "It taps into so many different styles of music - it's been really exciting for me to experiment and explore new territory. [...] It's a song that when I wrote it and not much thought was more by sound." "Heartbeat" (feat. Nicole Scherzinger) was described as a "raw" and "upbeat" song.

== Reception ==
=== Critics reviews ===
Professional ratings
Review scores
Source	Rating
AllMusic	3/5 stars
Digital Spy	3/5 stars
Entertainment Weekly	(B)
Sputnikmusic	3/5 stars
Laboratório Pop	(favorable)
The Washington Post	(favorable)
About.com (Latin Music)	3/5 stars
Billboard	(favorable)

Since its release, the album has received mixed reviews. Robert Copsey from Digital Spy gave the album 3 stars (out of 5), saying that "Euphoria fits between the sentimental Iglesias of the 'Hero' and 'Bailamos' era and the new, Down With The Kids Enrique. The latter is generally more entertaining, with the robotic vocal effects and rave-tinged production, but the end result here is not necessarily what Iglesias may have intended". He finished the review saying that "Euphoria is a mixed bag of a record which tries a little too hard to please the disparate elements of his fanbase". In a more negative review, "Doug Belfast" from Sputnik Music thought that "Euphoria is really a mixed bag of a record that tries a little too hard at being something different, tries a little too hard at recapturing the glory of the past and tries a little too hard capturing a new fan base. All this is too hard to garner in one single record".

Stephen Thomas Erlewine from AllMusic gave 3 stars out of 5 for the album and went to say that "Euphoria is as bright as its title, a firm return to romance for the loverman" and "despite the contemporary flourishes, the heart of this album resides in Iglesias’ romantic balladeering, the kind of croon that crosses cultures, so much so that the tracks here slip between Spanish and English without much notice. No matter the language, Enrique maintains the seductive mood on Euphoria". Carlos Quintana from About.com Latin Music said that Euphoria is an album that consolidates Enrique Iglesias as leading figure in Latin Pop genre. The album offers a great combination of sounds & features outstanding performances by different artists. This is a solid album by Enrique and a great album for mainstream music fans. Leila Cobo from Billboard gave a positive review stating, " Even when Iglesias gets introspective there is a sweet innocence to the interpretation, and the end result of the song-and the album-feels light, but not superficial. "Euphoria" aims unabashedly for all-out fun, and that's why it works."

=== Awards and nominations ===
Year	Ceremony	Award	Result
2010	Premios Oye!	Best Male Pop Album	Nominated
2011	Billboard Music Awards	Top Latin Album	Won
2011	Billboard Latin Music Awards	Album of the Year	Won
2011	Billboard Latin Music Awards	Latin Pop Album of the Year	Won
2011	Billboard Latin Music Awards	Latin Digital Album of the Year	Nominated
2011	Latin Grammy Awards	Album of the Year	Nominated
2011	Premio Lo Nuestro Awards	Album of the Year	Nominated
2011	Premios Juventud	Just Play It All	Nominated
2012	Latin Billboard Music Awards	Latin Pop Album of the Year	Nominated

=== Commercial performance ===
On the Billboard 200, Euphoria was the second-highest new entry, debuting at number ten with 27,000 copies. The album has become his best selling in years, and in essence is a comeback record for Iglesias. His last studio set, 2007's Insomniac, debuted and peaked on the Billboard 200 at number seventeen with 45,000 sold in its first week. Enrique Iglesias shares his seventh number-one on U.S. Top Latin Albums as Euphoria arrives with 27,000 sold. On the Billboard 200 Iglesias achieves his second top ten, as Euphoria bows at No. 10. His only other visit to that part of the chart was when Escape hit No. 2 in 2001. The album also spent 11 weeks at No. 1 on the Billboard Top Latin Albums chart. On the UK Albums Chart, the album debut at number six. Iglesias debuted at number five on the European Top 100 Albums chart with Euphoria, after starting at number-one in Spain, number five in the Netherlands and Switzerland, number six in the United Kingdom (with first-week sales of 20,000) and number ten in France and Ireland. Euphoria also debuted at number-one in Mexico. On its second week it stayed at number-one and was certified Gold.

== Singles ==
"Cuando me enamoro" was released as the lead Spanish-Language single from the album. The song debuted at #8 and #25 on U.S Latin Pop Songs and U.S. Hot Latin Songs respectively. The song became Iglesias' 25th Top 10 single on the U.S. Billboard Hot Latin Songs. Four weeks later, it became his 21st #1 single on the chart. The song received a Latin Grammy nomination for Song of the Year.

"I Like It" was released as the lead English-Language single from the album on 3 May 2010 in the United States, and 28 June 2010 in the United Kingdom. The track, which features Pitbull, reached #4 on the Billboard Hot 100. Seven weeks later, it climbed to #1 on the Billboard Dance Club Play Chart, making it Iglesias' 7th #1 single on that chart. The song also reached #1 on the Latin Pop Airplay Chart, and peaked at #3 on the UK Singles Chart.

"Heartbeat" was initially released as the first promo single form Euphoria on 8 June 2010 prior to the release of the album. It later received the full single treatment in September 2010 for international markets only. It never received the full single treatment in the US, which is why it failed to enter the Billboard Hot 100. The music video for the track premiered on 9 September 2010. The single reached #4 in Denmark and France, #5 in Australia, #8 in the UK, #9 in New Zealand, and #20 in the Netherlands.

"No me digas que no" was initially released as the second promo single from "Euphoria" on 22 June 2010 prior to the release of the album. It later received the full single treatment in October 2010. It hit radio stations on 19 October 2010. Iglesias performed the song at 2010 Latin Grammy Awards. The music video premiered on 18 November 2010. The song reached #1 on the U.S. Billboard Hot Latin Songs chart, becoming his 22nd #1 single on the chart.

"Tonight (I'm Lovin' You)" was released as the first single from the reissue of the album on 1 November 2010. The track features American rapper Ludacris. The song topped US Hot Dance Club Songs, becoming the Male Artist with the most #1 songs on the US Hot Dance Club Songs chart. The song also topped US Radio Songs and US Pop Songs, making the song Enrique's biggest airplay hit in his career. The song was performed for the first time at American Music Awards. It reached number 4 on the Billboard Hot 100.

"Ayer" was released as the third Spanish-language single from the album on 5 July 2011. The video for the song premiered on 29 July 2011. It debuted at no 38 on Billboard Latin Pop Songs chart on the issue of 28 September 2011. It peaked up to #3 on Hot Latin Songs chart as well as Latin Pop Songs. It peaked to #1 Tropical Songs chart.

"Dirty Dancer" was released as the second single from the reissue of the album on 9 May 2011. The song appeared on the original version of the album, however, for its single release it was remixed with a new instrumental and new verses from Lil Wayne and Nayer. It reached number 18 on the Billboard Hot 100. The single also peaked on Billboard Hot Dance Club Play chart marking Enrique's 9th no one on the chart more than any male artist.

On 4 October 2011, "I Like How It Feels" featuring rapper Pitbull (who appeared on "I Like It") and producers The WAV.s was released for digital download, intended as the first single from the re-release edition of Euphoria (entitled Euphoria Reloaded) and the eighth overall single. However, due to poor performance of the song worldwide, plans of the reissue were canceled. The song debuted at #74 on Billboard Hot 100 chart while it reached #1 on Hot Dance Club Play chart listing Enrique in the top 10 Dance/Club Artists of all time.

== Track listing ==
International edition
No.	Title	Writer(s)	Producer(s)	Length
1.	"I Like It" (featuring Pitbull)	RedOne, Enrique Iglesias, Lionel Richie, Armando Perez	RedOne	3:52
2.	"One Day at a Time" (featuring Akon)	RedOne, Iglesias, Frankie Storm, Akon	RedOne	4:05
3.	"Heartbeat" (featuring Nicole Scherzinger)	Iglesias, Mark Taylor, Jamie Scott	Taylor	4:17
4.	"Dirty Dancer" (with Usher)	RedOne, Iglesias, E. Kidd Bogart, Erika Nuri, David Quiñones	RedOne	3:34
5.	"Why Not Me?"	Iglesias, RedOne, Erika Nuri, E. Kidd Bogart	RedOne	3:39
6.	"No Me Digas Que No" (featuring Wisin & Yandel)	Iglesias, Descemer Bueno, Juan Luis Morena, Llandel Veguilla, Ernesto Padilla	Paucar, La Mente Maestra, El Nasi	4:30
7.	"Ayer"	Iglesias, Descemer Bueno	Paucar	3:33
8.	"Cuando Me Enamoro" (featuring Juan Luis Guerra)	Iglesias, Descemer Bueno	Paucar	3:20
9.	"Dile Que"	Iglesias, Coti Soronkin	Paucar	3:41
10.	"Tú y Yo"	Iglesias, Aleks Syntek	Fernando Garibay	4:01
11.	"Heartbreaker"	Iglesias, Taylor, Wayne Hector	Taylor	4:05
12.	"Coming Home"	Iglesias, Taylor, Scott	Taylor	3:59
13.	"Everything's Gonna Be Alright"	Lenny Medina, Iglesias, Hector	Medina, Paucar	3:47
14.	"No Me Digas Que No"	Iglesias, Descemer Bueno	Paucar	4:08
Total length:				54:36

American standard edition
No.	Title	Length
1.	"Cuando Me Enamoro" (featuring Juan Luis Guerra)	3:20
2.	"No Me Digas Que No" (featuring Wisin & Yandel)	4:30
3.	"Ayer"	3:33
4.	"Dile Que"	3:41
5.	"I Like It" (featuring Pitbull)	3:52
6.	"One Day at a Time" (featuring Akon)	4:05
7.	"Heartbeat" (featuring Nicole Scherzinger)	4:17
8.	"Dirty Dancer" (with Usher)	3:34
9.	"Tú y Yo"	4:01
10.	"No Me Digas Que No"	4:07
Total length:		39:03

American deluxe edition
No.	Title	Length
1.	"I Like It" (featuring Pitbull)	3:52
2.	"One Day at a Time" (featuring Akon)	4:05
3.	"Heartbeat" (featuring Nicole Scherzinger)	4:17
4.	"Dirty Dancer" (featuring Usher)	3:34
5.	"Why Not Me?"	3:39
6.	"No Me Digas Que No" (featuring Wisin & Yandel)	4:30
7.	"Ayer"	3:33
8.	"Cuando Me Enamoro" (featuring Juan Luis Guerra)	3.20
9.	"Dile Que"	3:41
10.	"Tú Y Yo"	4:01
11.	"Heartbreaker"	4:05
12.	"Coming Home"	3:59
13.	"No Me Digas Que No"	4:08
Total length:		39:03

British edition
No.	Title	Length
1.	"I Like It" (featuring Pitbull)	3:52
2.	"One Day at a Time" (featuring Akon)	4:01
3.	"Heartbeat" (featuring Nicole Scherzinger)	4:17
4.	"Why Not Me?"	3:36
5.	"Dirty Dancer" (with Usher)	3:39
6.	"Heartbreaker"	4:05
7.	"Everything's Gonna Be Alright"	3:48
8.	"Coming Home"	4:00
9.	"Cuando Me Enamoro" (featuring Juan Luis Guerra)	3:21
10.	"No Me Digas Que No" (featuring Wisin & Yandel)	4:28
11.	"I Like It" (No Rap Edit) (Digital Bonus Track)	3:14
Total length:		42:27

Collector's edition
No.	Title	Producer(s)	Length
1.	"Tonight (I'm Fuckin' You)" (featuring Ludacris and DJ Frank E)		3:51
2.	"I Like It" (featuring Pitbull)	RedOne	3:52
3.	"One Day at a Time" (featuring Akon)		4:05
4.	"Heartbeat" (featuring Nicole Scherzinger)		4:17
5.	"Dirty Dancer" (with Usher)		3:34
6.	"Why Not Me?"		3:39
7.	"No Me Digas Que No" (featuring Wisin & Yandel)		4:30
8.	"Ayer"		3:33
9.	"Cuando Me Enamoro" (featuring Juan Luis Guerra)		3:20
10.	"Dile Que"		3:41
11.	"Tú y yo"		4:01
12.	"Heartbreaker"		4:05
13.	"Coming Home"		3:59
14.	"Everything's Gonna Be Alright"		3:47
15.	"No Me Digas Que No"		4:08
16.	"Tonight (I'm Lovin' You)" (featuring Ludacris and DJ Frank E)		3:51
17.	"I Like It" (Cahill Club Remix Edit) (featuring Pitbull)		3:40
18.	"Heartbeat" (Glam as You Radio Mix By Guena LG) (featuring Nicole Scherzinger)		4:04

Special Indian edition
No.	Title	Length
1.	"Tonight (I'm Lovin' You)" (featuring Ludacris and DJ Frank E)	3:51
2.	"I Like It" (featuring Pitbull)	3:52
3.	"Heartbeat" (India Mix) (featuring Sunidhi Chauhan)	3:32
4.	"One Day at a Time" (featuring Akon)	4:05
5.	"Dirty Dancer" (with Usher)	3:34
6.	"Why Not Me?"	3:39
7.	"Heartbeat" (featuring Nicole Scherzinger)	4:17
8.	"No Me Digas Que No" (featuring Wisin & Yandel)	4:30
9.	"Ayer"	3:33
10.	"Cuando Me Enamoro" (featuring Juan Luis Guerra)	3:20
11.	"Dile Que"	3:41
12.	"Tú y Yo"	4:01
13.	"Heartbreaker"	4:05
14.	"Coming Home"	3:59
15.	"Everything's Gonna Be Alright"	3:47
16.	"No Me Digas Que No"	4:08
17.	"Heartbeat" (India Club Mix) (featuring Sunidhi Chauhan)	3:32
18.	"I Like It" (Cahill Club Remix Edit) (featuring Pitbull)	3:40
19.	"I Like It" (Chuckie Radio Mix) (featuring Pitbull)	3:08

== Charts ==
=== Weekly charts ===
Chart (2010)	Peak position
Australian Albums (ARIA)	6
Austrian Albums (Ö3 Austria)	37
Belgian Albums (Ultratop Flanders)	7
Belgian Albums (Ultratop Wallonia)	11
Canadian Albums (Billboard	12
Danish Albums (Hitlisten)	12
Dutch Albums (Megacharts)	5
European Top 100 Albums	5
Finnish Albums (Suomen virallinen lista	11
French Albums (SNEP)	10
German Albums (Offizielle Top 100	87
Greek Albums (IFPI)	3
Irish Albums (IRMA)	10
Italian Albums (FIMI)	55
Mexican Albums (AMPROFON	1
Norwegian Albums (VG-lista)	33
Polish Albums (OLiS)	22
Russian Albums (Tophit)	6
Scottish Albums (OCC)	6
Spanish Albums (PROMUSICAE)	1
Swedish Albums (Sverigetopplistan)	52
Swiss Albums (Schweizer Hitparade)	4
UK Albums (OCC)	6
US Billboard 200	10
US Top Latin Albums (Billboard)	1
US Latin Pop Albums (Billboard)	1

=== Year-end charts ===
Chart (2010)	Position
Australian Albums (ARIA)	71
European Top 100 Albums (Billboard)	98
French Albums (SNEP)	117
Mexican Albums (AMPROFON)	10
Swiss Albums (Schweizer Hitparade)	94
UK Albums (OCC)	148
US Billboard 200	185
US Top Latin Albums (Billboard)	2
US Latin Pop Albums (Billboard)	1
Chart (2011)	Position
Australian Albums (ARIA)	92
US Top Latin Albums (Billboard)	5

== Certifications and sales ==
Region	Certification	Certified units/sales
Australia (ARIA)	Gold	35,000^{^}
Brazil (Pro-Música Brasil)	Gold	20,000^{‡}
Canada (Music Canada)	Gold	40,000^{^}
Denmark (IFPI Danmark)	Gold	10,000^{‡}
France (SNEP)	Gold	50,000^{*}
Mexico (AMPROFON)	Platinum	60,000^{^}
New Zealand (RMNZ)	Gold	7,500^{‡}
Poland (ZPAV)	Gold	10,000^{*}
Singapore (RIAS)	Gold	5,000^{*}
United Kingdom (BPI)	Gold	100,000^{*}
United States (RIAA)	2× Platinum (Latin)	225,000
^{*} Sales figures based on certification alone.^{^} Shipments figures based on certification alone.^{‡} Sales+streaming figures based on certification alone.

== Release history ==
Region	Date	Edition	Label
Netherlands	2 July 2010	International edition	Universal Music
Switzerland	2 July 2010	International edition	Universal Music
Ireland	2 July 2010	British edition	Polydor
Belgium	2 July 2010	American standard edition	Universal Music
Belgium	2 July 2010	International edition	Universal Music
France	5 July 2010	International edition	Universal Music
Norway	5 July 2010	American standard edition	Universal Music
Norway	5 July 2010	American deluxe edition	Universal Music
Norway	5 July 2010	International edition	Universal Music
Portugal	5 July 2010	American standard edition	Universal Music
Portugal	5 July 2010	International edition	Universal Music
Sweden	5 July 2010	International edition	Universal Music
Singapore	5 July 2010	International edition	Universal Music
Belgium	5 July 2010	American deluxe edition	Universal Music
Spain	5 July 2010	International edition	Universal Music
United Kingdom	5 July 2010	British edition	Polydor
United States	6 July 2010	American standard edition	Universal Republic, Universal Music Latino
United States	6 July 2010	American deluxe edition	Universal Republic, Universal Music Latino
Hong Kong	6 July 2010	British edition	Polydor
Germany	6 July 2010	International edition	Universal Music
Austria	6 July 2010	International edition	Universal Music
India	9 July 2010	International edition	Universal Music
Italy	27 July 2010	International edition	Universal Music
Austria	27 August 2010	American standard edition	Universal Music
China	25 September 2010	International edition	Universal Music

Region	Date	Format
France	6 December 2010	Limited 2CD Edition
France	28 March 2011	New Collector's Edition
India	21 March 2011	New Special India Edition
Netherlands	25 March 2011	New Collectors edition
Belgium	25 March 2011	New Collectors edition
Spain	28 March 2011	New Collectors edition
France	28 March 2011	New Collectors edition
Singapore	28 March 2011	New Collectors edition
Hong Kong	30 March 2011	New Collectors edition

== See also ==
- List of number-one albums of 2010 (Spain)
- List of number-one albums of 2010 (Mexico)
- List of number-one Billboard Latin Albums of 2010
- List of number-one Billboard Latin Pop Albums of 2010
