= List of Billboard Mainstream Top 40 number-one songs of 2011 =

This is a list of songs which reached number one on the Billboard Mainstream Top 40 (or Pop Songs) chart in 2011.

During 2011, a total of 18 singles hit number-one on the charts.

== Chart history ==
Key
†	Indicates best-performing single of 2011

Issue date	Song	Artist(s)	Ref.
January 1	"Raise Your Glass"	P!nk	
January 8	"Firework"	Katy Perry	
January 15	"Firework"	Katy Perry	
January 22	"Firework"	Katy Perry	
January 29	"Firework"	Katy Perry	
February 5	"Grenade"	Bruno Mars	
February 12	"Grenade"	Bruno Mars	
February 19	"Grenade"	Bruno Mars	
February 26	"Grenade"	Bruno Mars	
March 5	"Grenade"	Bruno Mars	
March 12	"Tonight (I'm Lovin' You)"	Enrique Iglesias featuring Ludacris & DJ Frank E	
March 19	"Tonight (I'm Lovin' You)"	Enrique Iglesias featuring Ludacris & DJ Frank E	
March 26	"Fuckin' Perfect"	P!nk	
April 2	"Fuckin' Perfect"	P!nk	
April 9	"Born This Way"	Lady Gaga	
April 16	"Fuck You (Forget You)"	Cee Lo Green	
April 23	"S&M"	Rihanna	
April 30	"E.T."	Katy Perry featuring Kanye West	
May 7	"E.T."	Katy Perry featuring Kanye West	
May 14	"E.T."	Katy Perry featuring Kanye West	
May 21	"E.T."	Katy Perry featuring Kanye West	
May 28	"E.T."	Katy Perry featuring Kanye West	
June 4	"E.T."	Katy Perry featuring Kanye West	
June 11	"Rolling in the Deep"	Adele	
June 18	"Rolling in the Deep"	Adele	
June 25	"Rolling in the Deep"	Adele	
July 2	"Rolling in the Deep"	Adele	
July 9	"Rolling in the Deep"	Adele	
July 16	"Give Me Everything"	Pitbull featuring Ne-Yo, Afrojack & Nayer	
July 23	"Give Me Everything"	Pitbull featuring Ne-Yo, Afrojack & Nayer	
July 30	"Give Me Everything"	Pitbull featuring Ne-Yo, Afrojack & Nayer	
August 6	"Party Rock Anthem" †	LMFAO featuring Lauren Bennett & GoonRock	
August 13	"Last Friday Night (T.G.I.F.)"	Katy Perry	
August 20	"Last Friday Night (T.G.I.F.)"	Katy Perry	
August 27	"Last Friday Night (T.G.I.F.)"	Katy Perry	
September 3	"Last Friday Night (T.G.I.F.)"	Katy Perry	
September 10	"Last Friday Night (T.G.I.F.)"	Katy Perry	
September 17	"Last Friday Night (T.G.I.F.)"	Katy Perry	
September 24	"I Wanna Go"	Britney Spears	
October 1	"Moves Like Jagger"	Maroon 5 featuring Christina Aguilera	
October 8	"Moves Like Jagger"	Maroon 5 featuring Christina Aguilera	
October 15	"Moves Like Jagger"	Maroon 5 featuring Christina Aguilera	
October 22	"Moves Like Jagger"	Maroon 5 featuring Christina Aguilera	
October 29	"Moves Like Jagger"	Maroon 5 featuring Christina Aguilera	
November 5	"Moves Like Jagger"	Maroon 5 featuring Christina Aguilera	
November 12	"Stereo Hearts"	Gym Class Heroes featuring Adam Levine	
November 19	"Stereo Hearts"	Gym Class Heroes featuring Adam Levine	
November 26	"Stereo Hearts"	Gym Class Heroes featuring Adam Levine	
December 3	"Without You"	David Guetta featuring Usher	
December 10	"We Found Love"	Rihanna featuring Calvin Harris	
December 17	"We Found Love"	Rihanna featuring Calvin Harris	
December 24	"We Found Love"	Rihanna featuring Calvin Harris	
December 31	"We Found Love"	Rihanna featuring Calvin Harris	

== See also ==
- 2011 in music
