= ¡Sin Salsa No Hay Paraíso! =

Studio album by El Gran Combo de Puerto Rico
- Released: 2010

¡Sin Salsa No Hay Paraíso! (2010) is the 63rd album by El Gran Combo de Puerto Rico.

The album, on Sony Discos Norte, was shortlisted for Premio Lo Nuestro 2011, 2011 Latin Billboard Music Awards, Grammy Award for Best Traditional Tropical Latin Album but in each case lost out to other artists.

The title single "¡Sin Salsa No Hay Paraíso!" opened at No.9 on the Tropical Airplay chart.
