= Tonight (I'm Lovin' You) =

2010 single by Enrique Iglesias

Single by Enrique Iglesias featuring Ludacris and DJ Frank E

from the album Euphoria
- Released: 22 November 2010
- Recorded: 2010
- Genre: Dance
- Length: 3:51
- Label: Universal Republic; Universal Music Latino
- Songwriters: Enrique Iglesias; Jacob Luttrell; Lauren Christy; Christopher Bridges
- Producer: DJ Frank E

Enrique Iglesias singles chronology
"No Me Digas Que No" (2010)	"Tonight (I'm Lovin' You)" (2010)	"Dirty Dancer" (2011)

Ludacris singles chronology
"Saturday Night" (2010)	"Tonight (I'm Lovin' You)" (2010)	"Little Bad Girl" (2011)

DJ Frank E singles chronology
"Tonight (I'm Lovin' You)" (2010)

"Tonight (I'm Fuckin' You)", censored as "Tonight (I'm Lovin' You)" or simply "Tonight" in altered versions, is a song by Spanish singer Enrique Iglesias. It features American rapper Ludacris and producer DJ Frank E. The song was released to US radio on 1 November 2010, as the album's second US single, and digitally on 22 November 2010. The altered version of the song was included on the French limited edition of Euphoria. The official remix features American rapper Pitbull.

"Tonight (I'm Lovin' You)" was a worldwide hit, peaking at number four on the Billboard Hot 100, making it his highest-charting single on the chart since 2010's "I Like It". The song also reached the top ten in Australia, New Zealand, and the United Kingdom, among other major music markets. The single has sold over five million copies worldwide to date.

== Reception ==
=== Critical reception ===
Matthew Wilkening from AOL Radio Blog said that the song "aims directly for the dance floor with a galloping, club-ready dance beat, along with an insistent, heavily synthesized keyboard zipping all over the place. [...] Enrique's slightly processed vocals drip with confidence, and depending on which version you hear, a healthy dose of profanity as he demands some loving".

Erica Y. Lopez from Fox News Latino said, "With the star power Iglesias brings to the table and a very danceable beat accompanying the track, it is conceivable that the clean version would be a hit in its own right -- but add one of the heaviest cuss words in the English language [...] it is basically club ready".

=== Lyrical content ===
"Tonight (I'm Lovin' You)" (2010)
A 23-second sample of the clean version, "Tonight (I'm Lovin' You)".

The song was criticized for the "raunchiness" of the content and of the lyrics, and when MTV News caught up with Iglesias at a rehearsal for the 2010 American Music Awards, he maintained that "isn't meant to twist up any knickers, but rather is just good, kind-of clean fun. [...] I thought it was a strong statement ... to say in a song, but it's fun," [...] "It's probably what a lot of guys and girls think about at times, but they don’t have the guts to say. It’s pretty straightforward. Music has become so direct and you can say whatever you want, which is cool. At the end of the day, it’s just a song — you don’t have to take it seriously. You can have fun with it". A clean version of the song, retitled "Tonight (I'm Lovin' You)", is also available.

=== Other versions ===
In December 2010, a version of "Tonight (I'm Lovin' You)" with the Latin rapper Pitbull was released. At the end of February 2011, a new version of "Tonight (I'm Fuckin' You)" was released, with the singer Luciana featured in the beginning and the bridge, rapping and reprising the hook from Divinyls' hit "I Touch Myself".

== Chart performance ==
On the week of 4 December 2010, the song debuted at number 35 on the Billboard Mainstream Top 40, and at number 19 on the Bubbling Under Hot 100. On the week of 11 December 2010, the song debuted at number 13 on the Digital Songs chart, with 97,000 digital downloads in the first week in the United States, according to Nielsen Soundscan. It also debuted at number 18 on the Billboard Hot 100. Soon after, it broke into the top ten on the Hot 100 and peaked at number four, making it Iglesias' fifth and latest top 10 hit in the US. As of September 2013, the single had sold 3,204,000 digital downloads in the United States.

The song entered the charts at number four in New Zealand on 17 January. The song has reached number one on the Hot Dance Club Songs chart, making it his eighth number one song on that chart, beating Michael Jackson and Prince. In Australia, the song has sold over 500,000 copies. The song has become Iglesias' biggest airplay hit of his career in the US, becoming his first and only number one on both Top 40 radio (the Pop Songs chart), as well as all US radio formats combined (the Radio Songs chart).

== Music video ==
Iglesias on the bed with several women behind him.

A music video for the song was filmed early December 2010. The video was shot over four days in Los Cabos, Baja California Sur, Mexico and Los Angeles. It featured rapper Ludacris and was directed by BBGun (Alex Bergman, Maxim Bohichik) and Parris. Iglesias explains that it's "a little more cinematic, a little more of a long story." Before the video premiere, two snippets of the music video were offered as teasers through his official website. The video for the clean version was premiered on 22 December 2010, one month after the release of the song.

In the video, Iglesias visits a strip club and an attractive woman (Kristen Carpenter) catches his eye. The pair are then shown kissing in the toilets of the venue between scenes of clubbers dancing. Ludacris raps his verse in the back of a taxi, flanked by four ladies. Iglesias then lays out to meet another woman (Natalia Obradovicova) in Mexico and the pair have sex in a hotel room. Then the girl from the strip club and Iglesias' new lover meet and realize that he's been two-timing. The next scene shows several women writhing provocatively on a bed, all attracted to Enrique (this does not happen in the clean version). Iglesias sails off on a boat with the two women while the last scene shows the two women look into each other's eyes and the video ends as they share a lesbian kiss.

The entertainment portal DesiHits said that "all of Enrique's videos have been hot, but 'Tonight (I'm Lovin' You)' takes the crown as it is quite a provocative clip." Jocelyn Vena from MTV explained "Iglesias has noted that when he sat down to record the song about being straightforward with a lady about his intentions to bed her, he didn’t want to sound 'arrogant'. It seems that, while this video will never be 'Hero', we're excited to see what Enrique has up his sleeve for the clip for this very, very special track."

The music video aroused a lot of controversy in France, due to its sexual explicit content and erotic images, and the fact that the warning Not advised to kids under 10 years old (in French: Déconseillé aux moins de 10 ans) didn't appear in all music channels. Many parents and families complained that such content is broadcast during the day, which can hit the sensitivity of young people. Thus, on May 2, 2011, the French Audiovisual Regulation would decide to ban the "Tonight" music video along with Rihanna's controversial SM video "S&M" from day TV-broadcasting and only broadcast it after 10 p.m. After its ban, "Tonight (I'm Lovin' You)" was broadcast with or without a warning Not advised to kids under 10 years old (in French : Déconseillé aux moins de 10 ans) or Not advised to kids under 12 years old (in French : Déconseillé aux moins de 12 ans) (depending on music channels), same as Rihanna's video. The video was ranked at #4 at the Best Videos of 2011 by MTV. Different versions of the video together have been viewed over 250 million times.

== Awards and nominations ==
Year	Ceremony	Date of ceremony	Award	Result
2011	MTV Video Music Awards	28 August 2011	Best Latino Artist	Nominated
2011	Ev.Gerard Music Video Awards	14 November 2011	Best Latin Video	Nominated

== Track listing ==
US digital download

1. "Tonight (I'm F**kin' You)" – 3:52

German and UK CD single

1. "Tonight (I'm Lovin' You)" – 3:54
2. "Tonight (I'm F**kin' You)" – 3:54

UK digital single

1. "Tonight (I'm F**kin' You)" – 3:52
2. "Tonight (I'm Lovin' You)" – 3:51

== Charts ==
=== Weekly charts ===
Chart (2010–11)	Peak position
Australia (ARIA)	2
Austria (Ö3 Austria Top 40)	6
Belgium (Ultratop 50 Flanders)	7
Belgium (Ultratop 50 Wallonia)	18
Canada Hot 100 (Billboard)	3
Canada AC (Billboard)	37
Canada CHR/Top 40 (Billboard)	1
Canada Hot AC (Billboard)	3
Czech Republic Airplay (ČNS IFPI)	14
Denmark (Tracklisten)	4
Euro Digital Songs (Billboard)	6
Finland (Suomen virallinen lista)	9
France (SNEP)	26
Germany (GfK)	12
Ireland (IRMA)	5
Israel International Airplay (Media Forest)	5
Italy (FIMI)	26
Luxembourg Digital Songs (Billboard)	3
Mexico (Billboard Ingles Airplay)	13
Mexico Anglo (Monitor Latino)	4
Netherlands (Dutch Top 40)	11
Netherlands (Single Top 100)	11
New Zealand (Recorded Music NZ)	2
Norway (VG-lista)	4
Poland (Dance Top 50)	37
Romania (Romanian Top 100)	2
Russia Airplay (TopHit)	4
Scottish Singles Sales (Official Charts)	2
Slovakia Airplay (ČNS IFPI)	3
Spain (Promusicae)	2
Sweden (Sverigetopplistan)	5
Switzerland (Schweizer Hitparade)	4
UK Singles (Official Charts)	5
Ukraine Airplay (TopHit)	26
US Billboard Hot 100	4
US Adult Pop Airplay (Billboard)	11
US Dance Club Songs (Billboard)	1
US Hot Latin Songs (Billboard)	10
US Pop Airplay (Billboard)	1
US Rhythmic Airplay (Billboard)	4
US Tropical Airplay (Billboard)	8

=== Year-end charts ===
Chart (2011)	Position
Australia (ARIA)	33
Austria (Ö3 Austria Top 40)	44
Belgium (Ultratop Flanders)	67
Canada (Canadian Hot 100)	9
Germany (Official German Charts)	84
Greece (IFPI)	24
Netherlands (Dutch Top 40)	85
Netherlands (Single Top 100)	95
New Zealand (RIANZ)	38
Romania (Romanian Top 100)	7
Russia Airplay (TopHit)	22
Spain (PROMUSICAE)	11
Sweden (Sverigetopplistan)	29
Switzerland (Schweizer Hitparade)	67
Ukraine Airplay (TopHit)	34
UK Singles (Official Charts Company)	90
US Billboard Hot 100	16
US Dance Club Songs (Billboard)	14
US Hot Latin Songs (Billboard)	36
US Mainstream Top 40 (Billboard)	11
US Rhythmic (Billboard)	24

== Certifications and sales ==
Region	Certification	Certified units/sales
Australia (ARIA)	7× Platinum	490,000^{‡}
Austria (IFPI Austria)	Gold	15,000^{*}
Canada (Music Canada)	3× Platinum	240,000^{*}
Denmark (IFPI Danmark)	Gold	15,000^{^}
Germany (BVMI)	Gold	150,000^{‡}
New Zealand (RMNZ)	Platinum	15,000^{*}
Spain (Promusicae)	Gold	20,000^{*}
Sweden (GLF)	Gold	20,000^{‡}
United Kingdom (BPI)	Gold	400,000^{‡}
United States (RIAA)	2× Platinum	3,204,000
^{*} Sales figures based on certification alone.^{^} Shipments figures based on certification alone.^{‡} Sales+streaming figures based on certification alone.

== Release history ==
Region	Date	Format	Label
United States	1 November 2010	Radio premiere	Universal Republic, Universal Music Latino
United States	22 November 2010	Digital download	Universal Republic, Universal Music Latino
United Kingdom	30 January 2011	Digital download	Polydor
Germany	1 April 2011	CD single	Polydor

== See also ==
- List of number-one dance singles of 2011 (U.S.)
- List of Mainstream Top 40 number-one hits of 2011 (U.S.)
