= Heartbeat (Enrique Iglesias song) =

2010 single by Enrique Iglesias

Single by Enrique Iglesias featuring Nicole Scherzinger

from the album Euphoria
- Released: 8 June 2010
- Recorded: 2009
- Studio: South Point (Miami, Florida)
- Genre: Electropop
- Length: 4:15 (album version); 3:50 (radio edit)
- Label: Universal Republic
- Songwriters: Enrique Iglesias; Jamie Scott; Mark Taylor
- Producer: Mark Taylor

Enrique Iglesias singles chronology
"I Like It" (2010)	"Heartbeat" (2010)	"No Me Digas Que No" (2010)

Nicole Scherzinger singles chronology
"Jai Ho! (You Are My Destiny)" (2009)	"Heartbeat" (2010)	"Poison" (2010)

Music video
- "Heartbeat" on YouTube

"Heartbeat" is a song by Spanish singer and songwriter Enrique Iglesias. The song was written by Iglesias, along with his long-term collaborators, Jamie Scott and Mark Taylor, for his ninth studio album Euphoria (2010). The mid-tempo ballad, produced by Taylor, features guest vocals from American singer Nicole Scherzinger. The song has a melody based on futuristic piano sounds and incorporates elements of dance music. The Rudi Wells' Open Heart Remix of the song later appeared on Scherzinger's debut studio album Killer Love (2011).

The song was released as the album's third overall single, though it is the second English-language single, on 8 June 2010 in the United States and later in October 2010 France and the United Kingdom. Critics praised the song for the way that Iglesias and Scherzinger's voices complemented each other. An accompanying music video features the pair in emotive mood-lit scenes, where digitally produced colored heartbeats react as they interact with each and the lyrics of the song. Another version of the song titled as "Heartbeat (India Mix)" featuring Indian singer Sunidhi Chauhan was included on a special Indian edition of Euphoria.

== Composition ==
Enrique Iglesias – "Heartbeat" featuring Nicole Scherzinger
"Heartbeat" is a mid-tempo dance ballad featuring a melody of futuristic piano notes.

"Heartbeat" is a mid-tempo electropop dance ballad featuring a melody led by futuristic piano notes. It was written by Iglesias, Jamie Scott and Mark Taylor, who also produced the song. Stephen Thomas Erlewine of AllMusic pointed out that the song had an "icy texture" while Becky Bain of Idolator noted that the duo's vocals carry much emotion. "Heartbeat" was also featured on Nicole Scherzinger's debut album, Killer Love (2011). The version featured on the album is the "Rudi Well's Open Heart Remix". Ellwood noted that the remix "added beats changing the tone of the song completely." and changed the song from dance, to more electronic rock and electro-industrial tendencies.

The song is written in the key of B ♭ major.

== Critical reception ==
Robbie Daw of Idolator called the song a "fragile and beautiful" track, whilst his colleague, Becky Bain, said that the song is a "perfect match for the duo's voices". Bain also said "['Heartbeat'] is thankfully kept under-produced, letting the emotions of both singers (who keep their vocals to a breathy, yearning coo) shine through." In his review for AllMusic, Stephen Thomas Erlewine said that the song is not an old-fashioned ballad, instead it "draws on the chilly textures of [singer-songwriter/producer] Ryan Tedder." Nick Levine of Digital Spy gave the song four out of five stars and described "the beats that mimic the pulse of a pounding chest, the simple-but-effective piano hook, the lyrics about "stealing your heart away" as cheesy.

== Live performances ==
Iglesias and Scherzinger appeared together to perform the song live on UK day-time TV programme, This Morning on 8 October 2010. He performed it live on Dancing with the Stars in Denmark on 22 October 2010. The following week it debuted at number five on the Danish Singles Chart. He also performed in live on The X Factor in Australia on 1 November, with DJ Havana Brown replacing Scherzinger. The duo reprised their performance at the Capital FM's Summertime Ball. They performed "Heartbeat" during Iglesias' set.

== Music video ==
The music video treatment for "Heartbeat" was directed by Hiro Murai and premiered on 14 September 2010. It features the use of an inner throbbing lights and Scherzinger wearing a lace outfit. The overall concept of the video sees a "shirtless Iglesias against a dark black background, while red and orange 'heartbeats' are added in simulation with his heartbeat. Then Nicole Scherzinger, who is sitting nude, waist-up against a solid black background, but with blue and purple 'heartbeats'." The music video was filmed in Kentwood, Michigan.

A music video for "Heartbeat (India Mix)" was made and Nicole Scherzinger was replaced by legendary Indian singer Sunidhi Chauhan alongside Enrique for that version.

=== Synopsis ===
Scherzinger (top) and Iglesias (bottom) seen as digitally added "Heartbeats" are added with streaks of blue and red color.

The video starts off with Enrique seen shirtless against a dark black background. As the music starts, Enrique is seen singing while digitally added red and orange "heartbeats" are added in simulation with his heartbeat. Nicole breaks into the song where she is seen sitting nude waist up against a solid black background. Similar to Enrique, digitally added blue and purple "heartbeats" are added in simulation with her heartbeat. In the following scene, Nicole and Enrique are seen together in a white, mirrored room. Enrique is wearing a red T-shirt and jeans while Nicole is wearing a red bra and underwear with a black lace dress over-top. The video cuts to a scene where the hook of the song kicks in; they're seen face to face looking like they're about to kiss while singing their parts. During the scene they're seen with a black spotlight on them while alternating blue and green background lighting is added. The video ends with Enrique's "heartbeat" darkening with each beat until it eventually fades out into a solid black screen.

=== Reception ===
A reviewer from 'Current Movie Reviews' said "Nicole Scherzinger and Enrique Iglesias did not fail to deliver a steaming hot video for their song 'Heartbeat'. Every moment of this video is sensuous. The electric lights beating as their hearts in their silhouetted bodies is pure genius. The hall of mirrors and the way they are searching for each other in them is imagery that carries the viewer right into the video. The sparks sizzling off these two is believable and I was pretty sure I was feeling their hearts beat together, even as mine started pounding." Christine Borges of The Miami New Times agreed with that the video was steamy. She said "[Enrique and Nicole] are put in some compromising positions while missing the majority of their clothes. But how much can you really see? Thanks to some dark lighting, all the important bits aren't really visible. But there's the knowledge that they're barely dressed, and sometimes, that's enough. Pulsing "heartbeat" lighting gives the impression of a laser show on their bare bodies, and Iglesias has his legs sprawled out and his head tilted back. You get the picture." Robbie Daw of 'Idolator' could not say anything bad about the video, instead focusing on the beauty of seeing both Scherzinger and Iglesias in the same video. He said "As for the video, anything that gets these two to whip off the clothing is always a good thing. Fingers crossed that 'Heartbeat' winds up being another 'I Like It'-sized smash."

== Track listing ==
- Digital download
1. "Heartbeat" (featuring Nicole Scherzinger) – 4:17
- CD single
1. "Heartbeat" (featuring Nicole Scherzinger) – 4:17
2. "Heartbeat" (featuring Nicole Scherzinger) (Rudi Wells Open Heart Remix) – 4:17
- Heartbeat (Remixes) - UK, Europe, Ireland and Australia Maxi Digital Single
1. "Heartbeat" (Cutmore Club Mix) – 6:40
2. "Heartbeat" (Cutmore Dub) – 6:50
3. "Heartbeat" (Digital Dog Dub) – 6:08
4. "Heartbeat" (Digital Dog Radio Mix) – 3:43
5. "Heartbeat" (Digital Dog Remix) – 6:05
6. "Heartbeat" (Rudi Wells' Open Heart Remix) – 4:16
- French CD single
1. "Heartbeat" (featuring Nicole Scherzinger) – 4:17
2. "Heartbeat" (featuring Nicole Scherzinger) [RLS Radio Edit] - 3:54
3. "Heartbeat" (featuring Nicole Scherzinger) [Digital Dog Radio Mix] – 3:44
4. "Heartbeat" (featuring Nicole Scherzinger) [Glam as You Club Mix by Guena LG] - 7:36
- Indian Digital download
1. "Heartbeat" (India Mix) (featuring Sunidhi Chauhan) - 3:32

== Credits and personnel ==
"Heartbeat" was recorded at South Point Studios in Miami, Florida.

- Songwriting – Enrique Iglesias, Jamie Scott, Mark Taylor
- Production, keyboards and programming – Mark Taylor
- Guitars – Patrick Mascall
- Piano – Jamie Scott
- Recording – Carlos Paucar
- Mixing – Rob Orton

== Charts ==
=== Weekly charts ===
Chart (2010)	Peak position
Australia (ARIA)	5
Belgium (Ultratop 50 Flanders)	36
Belgium (Ultratip Bubbling Under Wallonia)	2
Canada Hot 100 (Billboard)	72
CIS Airplay (TopHit)	9
Denmark (Tracklisten)	4
Finland (Suomen virallinen lista)	21
European Hot 100	30
France (SNEP)	4
Hungary (Rádiós Top 40)	2
Ireland (IRMA)	21
Italy (FIMI)	11
Netherlands (Mega Single Top 100)	20
New Zealand (RIANZ)	9
Poland (Video Chart)	2
Romania (Romanian Top 100)	49
Russia Airplay (TopHit)	11
Scotland Singles (Official Charts)	8
Slovakia Airplay (ČNS IFPI)	1
Sweden (Sverigetopplistan)	52
UK Singles (Official Charts)	8

=== Year-end charts ===
Chart (2010)	Position
Australian Singles Chart	52
Hungarian Airplay Chart	46
Russia Airplay (TopHit)	93

== Certifications ==
Region	Certification	Certified units/sales
Australia (ARIA)	2× Platinum	140,000^{^}
Denmark (IFPI Danmark)	Platinum	30,000^{^}
Italy (FIMI)	Gold	15,000^{*}
New Zealand (RMNZ)	Platinum	30,000^{‡}
United Kingdom (BPI)	Silver	200,000^{‡}
^{*} Sales figures based on certification alone.^{^} Shipments figures based on certification alone.^{‡} Sales+streaming figures based on certification alone.

== Release history ==
Region	Date	Format	Label
United States	8 June 2010	Digital download	Universal Republic
Canada	8 June 2010	Digital download	Universal Music
Australia	15 June 2010	Digital download	Universal Music
United Kingdom	30 September 2010	Digital download	Polydor Records
France	30 September 2010	Digital download	Universal Music
Belgium	30 September 2010	Digital download	Universal Music
New Zealand	30 September 2010	Digital download	Universal Music
Netherlands	30 September 2010	Digital download	Universal Music
Sweden	30 September 2010	Digital download	Universal Music
United Kingdom	4 October 2010	CD single	Polydor Records
France	22 November 2010	Digital download- Remix EP	Universal Music
France	3 January 2011	CD single	Universal Music
