= No Me Digas Que No =

Single by Enrique Iglesias featuring Wisin & Yandel

from the album Euphoria
- Released: 19 October 2010
- Genre: Dance-pop
- Length: 4:31
- Label: Universal Republic
- Songwriters: Enrique Iglesias, Descemer Bueno, Juan Luis Morena, Llandel Veguilla, Ernesto Padilla, Victor Martinez
- Producers: Carlos Paucar, Nesty "La Mente Maestra", Victor "El Nasi"

Enrique Iglesias singles chronology
"Heartbeat" (2010)	"No Me Digas Que No" (2010)	"Tonight (I'm Lovin' You)" (2010)

Wisin & Yandel singles chronology
"Estoy Enamorado" (2010)	"No Me Digas Que No" (2010)	"Zun Zun Rompiendo Caderas" (2010)

"No Me Digas Que No" (English: Don't Tell Me No) is a song performed by Spanish singer Enrique Iglesias taken from his first bilingual studio album, Euphoria. It was produced by Carlos Paucar and Reggaeton producers Nesty "La Mente Maestra" and Victor "El Nasi". It featured Reggaeton puerto rican Duó Wisin & Yandel. It was released digitally on 22 June 2010 as the second promotional Spanish single. The song hit the radio stations officially on 19 October 2010. It is the third collaborations between the artists after the remix versions of Lloro Por Tí and Gracias a Ti. The song peaked at number-one on the US Billboard Hot Latin Songs, becoming Enrique's twenty-second song to peak at number-one on the chart.

== Background ==
On the album, two versions of the song were included, a version with Iglesias alone, and a remixed version with the duo with whom Iglesias has collaborated on another two songs. Both versions have a completely different beat. The song was written by himself and Descemer Bueno, and the remixed version has additional lyrics from Wisin & Yandel, Ernesto Padilla better known as Nesty "La Mente Maestra" and Victor Martinez. A merengue remix was made replacing Wisin & Yandel with Omega "El Fuerte". Leila Cobo from Billboard said in relation to the song that "he (Iglesias) jumps into dance with both feet and eschews the duo's reggaetón in favor of uptempo club beats".

=== Live performance ===
Iglesias performed the song with a two-song medley, starting with "No Me Digas Que No" alongside the duó, and ending with his smash-hit "I Like It", during the 11th Annual Latin Grammy Awards at the Mandalay Bay Events Center on 11 November 2010 in Las Vegas, Nevada.

== Chart performance ==
On the week of 4 December 2010 the song debuted at number 34 on the Billboard Latin Pop Airplay, peaking at number 2, making his 28th entry to the Latin Pop Airplay chart. On the week of 18 December 2010 the song debuted at number #40 on the Billboard Latin Songs, peaking at number 8, it also entered the top twenty on the Billboard Tropical Songs and on the Mexican Top 20. The week of 19 March 2011 the song peaked at number #1 on the US Latin Songs, becoming his 22nd song to peak #1 on the chart, more than any other Latin artist.

== Music video ==
Enrique Iglesias (right) and Yandel (left) in the music video

=== Development ===
The music video for the song was filmed in Los Angeles, directed by long-time collaborator Jessy Terrero and produced by Josh Goldstein. Two versions of the video were filmed, one for the version featured Wisin & Yandel, and another for the alternate version with Iglesias only. It was premiered through his website on 18 November 2010.

=== Synopsis ===
The video begins with Iglesias into a car for the streets, while a woman (portrayed by Amra Silajdžić) drives. As the first hook of the song begins, it shows Iglesias alongside Wisin & Yandel in a dark room with bright lights. When the chorus of the song begins, Iglesias, is having a drink sitting in a chair in a nightclub, while it shows Wisin raps his verses into the nightclub. Through the video, he and Wisin & Yandel sing the song into different camera takes. At the last part of the video, Iglesias is reconnects with the woman who was driving the car, and Yandel's last verse ends the video.

== Track listing ==
1. "No Me Digas Que No" (featuring Wisin & Yandel) – 4:30
2. "No Me Digas Que No" – 4:08

== Charts ==
=== Weekly charts ===
Chart (2010–2011)	Peak position
Mexico (Monitor Latino)	14
US Bubbling Under Hot 100 (Billboard)	21
US Hot Latin Songs (Billboard)	1
US Latin Pop Airplay (Billboard)	1
US Tropical Airplay (Billboard)	2

=== Year-end charts ===
Chart (2011)	Position
US Hot Latin Songs (Billboard)	25

Notes

- The chartings are from the remixed version, with the exception of Mexico, which are chartings of the Iglesias only version.

== See also ==
- List of number-one Billboard Hot Latin Pop Airplay of 2011
- List of number-one Billboard Top Latin Songs of 2011
