= Airtel (FBI) =

Airtel is an outdated data communication process used internally within the FBI in addition to Teletype and facsimile. It indicates a letter that must be typed and mailed on the same day.

The FBI official abbreviation for airtel is A/T.

Airtels are indexed automatically by a ZyIndex searchable database, which stores and retrieves full text documents.

Airtels are marked by precedence: immediate, priority, or routine. They are also marked by classification: top secret, secret, confidential, unclassified EFTO (Encrypted For Transmission Only), and unclassified.

The inefficiencies inherent in the FBI's use of airtels led to an investigation conducted by the Office of the Inspector General of the FBI that culminated in the 2002 report entitled "An Investigation of the Belated Production of Documents in the Oklahoma City Bombing Case."
