= Bachata en Fukuoka =

Single by Juan Luis Guerra

from the album A Son de Guerra
- Released: March 22, 2010
- Genre: Bachata
- Length: 3:10
- Label: Capitol Latin
- Songwriter: Juan Luis Guerra
- Producer: Juan Luis Guerra

Juan Luis Guerra singles chronology
"Como Yo" (2008)	"Bachata en Fukuoka" (2010)	"Cuando Me Enamoro" (2010)

"Bachata en Fukuoka" (transl. "Bachata in Fukuoka") is the first single released by Dominican singer-songwriter Juan Luis Guerra for his album A Son de Guerra. It reached No. 1 on the Hot Latin Tracks chart in 2010, the second bachata song in the year to do so.

== Background ==
"Bachata en Fukuoka" is based on Guerra's experience during his trip to Fukuoka, Japan, where he was performing for the local people and was impressed by the fact that the locals could sing and dance to bachata, merengue, and mambo. He wrote the song while there.

== Music video ==
In the video, directed by Simon Brand, a piece of paper drops mysteriously in front of an elderly Japanese woman walking on a city sidewalk. She picks it up, immediately recognizes it (a drawing of a spiral pattern drawing similar to a nautilus shell), and promptly boards a bus heading out of the city to the beach. While on board, she reverts to being a young woman, then decides to disembark the slow-moving bus and travel to the beach by bicycle. When she finally arrives at the beach, she finds a familiar young man standing in the center of the same spiral pattern from the paper, drawn in large scale on the sand, and they begin to dance passionately together, first on the ground and later while floating through the air. At the end of the video, both the woman and her dance partner have reverted to their old age, but continue to dance on the beach.

== Chart performance ==
Bachata en Fukuoka reached No. 1 during the week of June 5, 2010, displacing Diego Torres's song, "Guapa". Bachata en Fukuoka was the second bachata song to reach No. 1 during 2010, after Aventura's "Dile al Amor".

Chart (2010)	Peak position
Peru Airplay (UNIMPRO)	10
Puerto Rico Airplauy (Top Latino)	1
Billboard Bubbling Under Hot 100	16
Billboard Hot Latin Tracks	1
Billboard Latin Tropical Airplay	1
Billboard Latin Rhythm Songs	5
Billboard Heatseekers Songs	14
Billboard Radio Songs	73
