= I Like It (Enrique Iglesias song) =

2010 single by Enrique Iglesias featuring Pitbull

Single by Enrique Iglesias featuring Pitbull

from the album Euphoria
- Released: 3 May 2010
- Recorded: 2009
- Genre: Electropop
- Length: 3:52
- Label: Universal Republic
- Songwriters: Enrique Iglesias; Nadir Khayat; Armando Pérez; Lionel Richie
- Producer: RedOne

Enrique Iglesias singles chronology
"Cuando Me Enamoro" (2010)	"I Like It" (2010)	"Heartbeat" (2010)

Pitbull singles chronology
"All Night Long" (2010)	"I Like It" (2010)	"DJ Got Us Fallin' in Love" (2010)

Music video
- "I Like It" on YouTube

"I Like It" is a song performed by Spanish singer Enrique Iglesias taken from his first bilingual studio album, Euphoria. It features guest vocals from American rapper Pitbull. Both artists co-wrote the electropop song with RedOne, who produced it. It also interpolates Lionel Richie's 1983 single "All Night Long (All Night)", with vocals re-recorded by Richie himself. "I Like It" was released on 3 May 2010 as the debut English single and second single overall. The song was also included on the official soundtrack to MTV reality series Jersey Shore. A version of the song without Pitbull is also found on the international version of Euphoria. The song also serves as the first single from the Jersey Shore soundtrack. The song was the official song of Airtel 2010 Champions League Twenty20. "I Like It" received mixed reviews from music critics, who praised its catchy melody and energetic production, but criticized its cheesy lyricism and over-reliance on Auto-Tune. Commercially, the song reached number one in Canada and the top ten in nineteen additional countries, including the United States and the United Kingdom, where it reached number four. The song has sold 4 million copies in the US alone.

== Background and composition ==
Enrique Iglesias featuring Pitbull – "I Like It"
A sample song of Enrique Iglesias' song "I Like It".

The song was composed by Enrique Iglesias, Pitbull, Lionel Richie, and RedOne. Iglesias and Pitbull wrote their lyrics, RedOne produced the music, and Richie's 1983 song "All Night Long (All Night)" is interpolated after the first and third choruses. The song is written in the key of G major mixolydian, with the chord progression of G-F-Am-G (recorded in A ♭ major). It is set in common time with a tempo of 129 beats per minute.

Pitbull's verse features a reference to the Tiger Woods and Jesse James scandals, joking that he was involved with both scandals. The official remix to the song was produced by JAYLIEN and features rapper T.I.

The song was also the official song of Airtel Champions League 2010 cricket tournament held in South Africa. Iglesias performed "I Like It" along with "Be With You" in the opening ceremony of Airtel Champions League 2010. The song was also the official song of the Spain national football team leading up to the World Cup 2010, in part due to Iglesias being Spanish.

== Critical reception ==
Professional ratings
Review scores
Source	Rating
About.com	3.5/5 stars
Digital Spy	3/5 stars
Rolling Stone	3.5/5 stars

"I Like It" received mixed reviews from music critics. Digital Spy's music editor, Robert Copsey, gave the song 3 stars out of 5 and said "The verses may feature enough Auto-Tune to make Kesha feel vocally exposed, and the Eurodisco production courtesy of RedOne may have a hint of the Cascada to it, but it's the cheesy lyrics that ensure this stays an unmistakably Enrique affair." Bill Lamb, editor of the website About.com, gave a positive review and rated it with 3.5 stars (out of 5), enjoying: "Enrique's charming pop falsetto", Lionel Richie "All Night Long" sample" and the "singalong chorus". Lamb concluded that: " "I Like It" features a retro disco-ish production from RedOne, guest raps from Latin star Pitbull, brief excerpts from Lionel Richie's party anthem "All Night Long," and a shout along chorus of "Baby, I like it!" The overall effect is hit single as churned out by committee. Still, despite the assembly line mentality, "I Like It" retains a certain pop charm. Erika Berlin of Rolling Stone also gave the song 3.5 stars (out of 5), saying "Enrique is back with his most danceable fiesta since 'Bailamos,'" and added "Pitbull gives us insight into his bedroom: "Tiger Woods times Jesse James equals Pitbull all night long." Cheating never sounded so fun!"

== Chart performance ==
The song reached number one on the Canadian Hot 100 and became a top-ten hit in a number of countries, including Australia, Belgium, Spain, the United Kingdom and the United States, where it reached number four on the Billboard Hot 100, becoming Iglesias' first solo top five hit in nearly eight years, the last being 2001's "Hero", which peaked at number three. The song peaked at number one in Canada, Australian Dance Charts, US Latin Pop Songs and US Hot Billboard Dance Club Songs. With this song Iglesias made history, tying with Michael Jackson and Prince as the male artist with most number-one hits at the Hot Dance Club Songs chart. It even reached number 2 on Mainstream Top 40 for four weeks, (kept from number one by "Dynamite" by Taio Cruz and "Teenage Dream" by Katy Perry).

On the Billboard Hot 100, the song made its debut at number eighty-nine and has since reached number four, becoming his best single on the U.S. charts since "Hero". This marked Iglesias' first foray into the Billboard Hot 100 top 10 in nearly nine years. The track is Iglesias' fourth Hot 100 top 10 and his first since "Hero" reached number three in November 2001. The song reached its 4 million sales mark in the US in September 2013. As of June 2014, the song has sold 4,081,000 copies in the US. I Like It hit number 12 on the Billboard Year-End Hot 100 in 2010, Iglesias's first song to do so since "Escape".

The song reached number one on the Canadian Hot 100 on the chart issue 25 September 2010. It debuted at number four on the UK Singles Chart, his highest-charting single in the UK since "Do You Know? (The Ping Pong Song)", which peaked at number three. On the Australian ARIA Charts, it has reached number two, his best Australian single since his 2001 hit "Hero", which topped the charts. On the European Hot 100, the song climbed the chart to number five. On the German Singles Chart, it debuted at No. 12 and reached its highest position, No. 10, in its 7th week on that chart. In France, the song debuted at number 2 in the issue of August 21, 2010, becoming Iglesias's fifth top ten and Pitbull's third. The single spent 24 weeks in the French Singles Chart.

== Music video ==
Enrique Iglesias and Pitbull dancing in the music video

A music video was filmed along with Pitbull directed by Wayne Isham. An alternate video featuring the MTV's Jersey Shore cast was also released, the music video for this version was released on 7 June 2010, directed by David Rousseau. As of June 2024, the video has been viewed over 365 million times on YouTube. It is Iglesias' first music video to cross 100 million views on the site.

== Awards ==
Year	Ceremony	Award	Result
2010	Teen Choice Awards	Choice Music: Hook Up	Nominated
2010	MTV Video Music Awards	Best Dance Music Video (Jersey Shore Version)	Nominated
2011	ASCAP Pop Music Awards	Most Performed Song	Won
2011	Billboard Latin Music Awards	Hot Latin Song Of The Year	Nominated
2011	International Dance Music Awards	Best Latin/Reggaeton Track	Nominated
2011	Premios Juventud	The Perfect Combo	Nominated
2012	BMI Latin Awards	Winning Song	Won

== Track listing ==
- CD single
1. "I Like It" (Main Version) – featuring Pitbull – 3:52
2. "I Like It" (Chuckie Remix) – featuring Pitbull – 5:34
- Remixes EP
1. "I Like It" (Avicii Remix) – 8:24
2. "I Like It ft. T.I. " (JAYLIEN Urban Remix) – 3:34
3. "I Like It" (Cahill Club Remix) – 6:31
4. "I Like It" (Cahill Dub) – 6:30
5. "I Like It" (Chuckie Dub) – 5:33
6. "I Like It" (Cahill Vocal Dub) – 6:31
7. "I Like It" (Chuckie Remix) – 5:33
8. "I Like It" (Chuckie Radio Mix) – 3:08
9. "I Like It" (Daddy's Groove Remix) – 7:01
10. "I Like It" (Sakke Remix) – 3:46

== Charts ==
=== Weekly charts ===
Chart (2010–2011)	Peak position
Australia (ARIA)	2
Austria (Ö3 Austria Top 40)	6
Belgium (Ultratop 50 Flanders)	5
Belgium (Ultratop 50 Wallonia)	3
Canada Hot 100 (Billboard)	1
Canada AC (Billboard)	9
Canada CHR/Top 40 (Billboard)	2
Canada Hot AC (Billboard)	2
Czech Republic Airplay (ČNS IFPI)	2
Denmark (Tracklisten)	8
Europe (European Hot 100 Singles)	4
Finland (Suomen virallinen lista)	8
France (SNEP)	2
Germany (GfK)	10
Global Dance Tracks (Billboard)	8
Hungary (Dance Top 40)	28
Hungary (Rádiós Top 40)	17
Hungary (Single Top 40)	7
Ireland (IRMA)	6
Netherlands (Dutch Top 40)	13
Netherlands (Single Top 100)	18
Mexico (Monitor Latino)	18
Mexico (Billboard Ingles Airplay)	3
New Zealand (Recorded Music NZ)	7
Norway (VG-lista)	7
Poland Airplay (ZPAV)	5
Poland Dance (ZPAV)	9
Russia Airplay (TopHit)	11
Scottish Singles Sales (Official Charts)	3
Slovakia Airplay (ČNS IFPI)	4
Spain (Promusicae)	4
Spanish Airplay Chart	3
Sweden (Sverigetopplistan)	26
Switzerland (Schweizer Hitparade)	6
UK Singles (Official Charts)	4
US Billboard Hot 100	4
US Adult Contemporary (Billboard)	20
US Adult Pop Airplay (Billboard)	9
US Dance Club Songs (Billboard)	1
US Hot Latin Songs (Billboard)	2
US Pop Airplay (Billboard)	2
US Rhythmic Airplay (Billboard)	6

=== Year-end charts ===
Chart (2010)	Position
Australia (ARIA)	14
Austria (Ö3 Austria Top 40)	44
Belgium (Ultratop Flanders)	34
Belgium (Ultratop Wallonia)	29
Brazil (Crowley)	63
Canada (Canadian Hot 100)	17
Denmark (Tracklisten)	35
European Hot 100 Singles	27
France (SNEP)	26
Germany (Official German Charts)	60
Hungary (Rádiós Top 40)	90
Italy (FIMI)	99
Netherlands (Dutch Top 40)	55
Netherlands (Single Top 100)	74
New Zealand (Recorded Music NZ)	36
Russia Airplay (TopHit)	93
Spain (PROMUSICAE)	19
Spain Top 20 TV	1
Switzerland (Schweizer Hitparade)	60
UK Singles (Official Charts Company)	51
US Billboard Hot 100	12
US Adult Top 40 (Billboard)	36
US Dance Club Songs (Billboard)	35
US Hot Latin Songs (Billboard)	30
US Mainstream Top 40 (Billboard)	8
US Rhythmic (Billboard)	47

Chart (2011)	Position
Canada (Canadian Hot 100)	96

== Certifications ==
Region	Certification	Certified units/sales
Australia (ARIA)	4× Platinum	280,000^{‡}
Austria (IFPI Austria)	Gold	15,000^{*}
Belgium (BRMA)	Gold	15,000^{*}
Brazil (Pro-Música Brasil)	Gold	30,000^{‡}
Canada (Music Canada)	3× Platinum	240,000^{*}
Denmark (IFPI Danmark)	Gold	15,000^{^}
Germany (BVMI)	Gold	150,000^{‡}
Italy (FIMI)	Gold	15,000^{*}
New Zealand (RMNZ)	Platinum	15,000^{*}
Spain (Promusicae)	Platinum	40,000^{*}
Switzerland (IFPI Switzerland)	Gold	15,000^{^}
United Kingdom (BPI)	Platinum	600,000^{‡}
United States (RIAA)	3× Platinum	4,081,000
^{*} Sales figures based on certification alone.^{^} Shipments figures based on certification alone.^{‡} Sales+streaming figures based on certification alone.

== Release history ==
Region	Date	Format
United States	3 May 2010	Digital download
United States	18 May 2010	Mainstream radio
Japan; Australia	30 April 2010	Digital download
United Kingdom	28 June 2010	CD; digital download
Germany; France	5 July 2010	CD single

== See also ==
- List of number-one dance singles of 2010 (U.S.)
- List of Hot 100 number-one singles of 2010 (Canada)
- List of number-one Billboard Hot Latin Pop Airplay of 2010
