= Cuando Me Enamoro =

Single by Enrique Iglesias featuring Juan Luis Guerra

from the album Euphoria
- Released: 26 April 2010
- Recorded: 2009
- Genre: Latin pop; Bachata
- Length: 3:21
- Label: Universal
- Songwriters: Enrique Iglesias, Descemer Bueno
- Producer: Carlos Paucar

Enrique Iglesias singles chronology
| "Gracias a Ti (Remix)" (2009) | "Cuando Me Enamoro" (2010) | "I Like It" (2010) |

Juan Luis Guerra singles chronology
| "Bachata en Fukuoka" (2010) | "Cuando Me Enamoro" (2010) | "Lola's Mambo" (2010) |

"Cuando Me Enamoro" (English: "When I Fall in Love") is a Latin pop song written and performed by Spanish pop singer-songwriter Enrique Iglesias and featuring Dominican singer-songwriter Juan Luis Guerra released on 26 April 2010, as the first single from his ninth studio album. The song is the main-theme of the Mexican telenovela of the same title starring Silvia Navarro and Juan Soler. This is the second time since "Nunca Te Olvidaré" that a song of Enrique Iglesias was chosen as the main-theme of a telenovela. "Cuando Me Enamoro" became a contender for Latin Grammy Award for Song of the Year. The single has sold around a million digital downloads worldwide to the date. This song was dedicated for K, O, M.

== Music video ==
Iglesias and Guerra in the music video

=== Development ===
The music video, directed by Jessy Terrero, was filmed along with Guerra in the elementary school St. Patrick & Assumption/All Saints, in Jersey City, New Jersey. The full music video premiered on Iglesias' Vevo account on 21 May 2010. As of May 2019, the video has been viewed more than 620 million times on YouTube.

=== Synopsis ===
In the story of the video, Iglesias and Guerra are guest stars invited to sing at a school. The music video simply starts when the school principal presents them to the students and they begin to sing. The video alternates between the stage performance and three vignettes that exemplify falling in love: a student in class contrives to get his friend in trouble so he can move into his friend's seat, which is next to his crush and allows him to pass her a "Do you like me," note; an un-athletic student is pummeled at dodge ball and then rescued by a girl who likes him and has a killer throw; a straight-A student who contrives to get sent to the principal's office because he is infatuated by her. The video has the participation of Ugly Betty actress Ana Ortiz as the principal Michelle Gomez.

== Awards and nominations ==
| Year | Ceremony | Award | Result |
|---|---|---|---|
| 2010 | Premios Orgullasamente | Latin Song of the Year | Nominated |
| 2010 | Premios Orgullasamente | Latin Video of the Year | Won |
| 2010 | Latin Grammy Awards | Song of the Year | Nominated |
| 2010 | Premios Oye! | Record of the Year | Nominated |
| 2010 | Premios Oye! | Best Spanish Theme of the Year | Won |
| 2011 | Billboard Latin Music Awards | Hot Latin Song of the Year | Won |
| 2011 | Billboard Latin Music Awards | Hot Latin Song of the Year, Vocal Event | Won |
| 2011 | Billboard Latin Music Awards | Hot Latin Airplay Song of the Year | Won |
| 2011 | Billboard Latin Music Awards | Hot Latin Tropical Airplay Song of the Year | Nominated |
| 2011 | Billboard Music Awards | Top Latin Song | Nominated |
| 2011 | ASCAP Awards | Pop/Ballad Winning Song | Won |
| 2011 | Premios Juventud | The Perfect Combo | Won |
| 2011 | Premio Lo Nuestro | Pop Song of the Year | Nominated |
| 2011 | Premio Lo Nuestro | Collaboration of the Year | Won |
| 2011 | Premios TVy Novelas | Best Musical Soap Opera Theme | Won |
| 2012 | Premios Juventud | Best Novela Theme | Nominated |

== Chart performance ==
The song debuted on number #22 on the Billboard Hot Latin Songs, on the Tropical Songs the song debuted at number #19 and number #8 on the Latin Pop Songs. On Spain the song is charted at number #35. It is the twenty-first time that a song by Iglesias topped on the Billboard Hot Latin Songs since Gracias a Tí (Remix) featuring Wisin & Yandel in 2009 as well as Juan Luis Guerra's seventh time to reach #1 on Hot Latin Tracks. This is also the third time a self-replacement happened in the history of the Hot Latin Tracks. The track spent 17 non-consecutive weeks at No # 1 at Hot Latin Track.

On the Billboard Hot 100, the song peaked at number #89 and was Iglesias' highest-charting Spanish single of his career at the time, surpassing "Lloro Por Ti", which reached #91.

== Track listing ==
Digital download
| No. | Title | Writer(s) | Length |
|---|---|---|---|
| 1. | "Cuando Me Enamoro" | Enrique Iglesias, Descemer Bueno | 3:21 |

== Charts and certifications ==
=== Weekly charts ===
| Chart (2010–11) | Peak position |
|---|---|
| Chile Top 20 | 1 |
| Colombian Airplay (National Report) | 2 |
| Mexico (Monitor Latino) | 1 |
| Spain (Promusicae) | 6 |
| Spain Airplay Chart | 5 |
| US Billboard Hot 100 | 89 |
| US Hot Latin Songs (Billboard) | 1 |
| US Latin Pop Airplay (Billboard) | 1 |
| Venezuela Top 100 (Record Report) | 21 |
| Venezuela Top Latino (Record Report) | 3 |

=== Certifications ===
| Region | Certification | Certified units/sales |
|---|---|---|
| Brazil (Pro-Música Brasil) | Gold | 30,000^{‡} |
| Spain (Promusicae) | Platinum | 40,000^{*} |
^{*} Sales figures based on certification alone.^{‡} Sales+streaming figures based on certification alone.

=== Year-end charts ===
| Chart (2010) | Position |
|---|---|
| US Hot Latin Songs (Billboard) | 1 |
| US Latin Pop Songs (Billboard) | 1 |
| US Tropical Airplay (Billboard) | 6 |
| Spanish Top50 Songs Year End 2010 | 24 |

| Chart (2011) | Position |
|---|---|
| US Hot Latin Songs (Billboard) | 40 |

=== Decade-end charts ===
| Chart (2010–2019) | Position |
|---|---|
| US Hot Latin Songs (Billboard) | 13 |

=== All-time charts ===
| Chart (2021) | Position |
|---|---|
| US Hot Latin Songs (Billboard) | 32 |

== See also ==
- 1968 song Quando m'innamoro and A Man Without Love
- List of number-one songs of 2010 (Mexico)
- List of Billboard Latin Rhythm Airplay number ones of 2010
- List of number-one Billboard Tropical Songs of 2010
