= Boyzone discography =

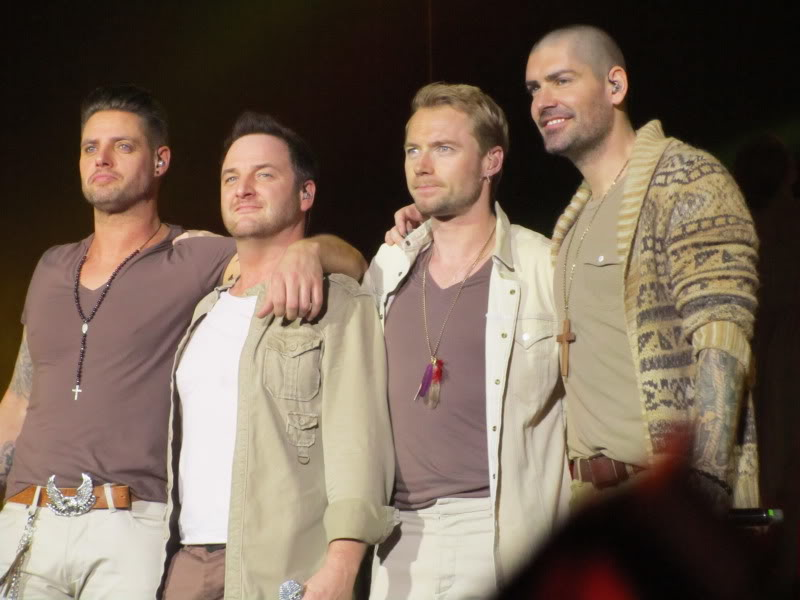
- Boyzone performing in 2011.
- Studio albums: 7
- Compilation albums: 9
- Singles: 30
- Video albums: 10
- Music videos: 30

The discography of Irish boy band Boyzone contains seven studio albums, nine compilation albums, one singles box set, thirty singles and ten video albums.

Boyzone released their debut single, a cover version of the Four Seasons' hit "Working My Way Back to You", in 1994 and it reached number three on the Irish Singles Chart. The release of their second single and cover version of the classic Osmonds' hit, "Love Me for a Reason", was their debut elsewhere. It peaked at number two on the UK Singles Chart and was included on their 1995 debut album Said and Done. The album reached number one in Ireland and the UK. Boyzone's second album, A Different Beat, was released in 1996 and contained the band's first UK number one single, a cover of the Bee Gees' hit "Words". The album also contained the singles "A Different Beat" and "Isn't It a Wonder". Their third album, Where We Belong, was released in 1998 and it contained the singles "All That I Need", "Baby Can I Hold You" and "No Matter What". In 1999, Boyzone released a greatest hits compilation, By Request. The band then went on hiatus whilst all the members pursued solo projects.

In September 2008, the band returned with "Love You Anyway", which peaked at number five in the UK, making it their seventeenth consecutive top five single. Their second single of 2008, "Better", peaked at number 22 in the UK. In 2010, "Gave It All Away", the lead single from their fourth studio album Brother, peaked at number 9 in the UK and number 1 in Ireland; "Love Is a Hurricane" was also released as a single from the album, but was less successful. In 2013, to celebrate 20 years of the band, their fifth studio album BZ20 was released, along with the single "Love Will Save the Day". In 2018, Boyzone released their seventh studio album Thank You & Goodnight, which spawned four singles.

== Albums ==
=== Studio albums ===
List of albums, with selected chart positions and certifications
| Title | Album details | Peak chart positions | | | | | | | | | | | Sales | Certifications |
| Title | Album details | IRE | AUS | AUT | FRA | GER | NLD | NZ | SWE | SWI | UK | US | Sales | Certifications |
|---|---|---|---|---|---|---|---|---|---|---|---|---|---|---|
| Said and Done | Released: 21 August 1995; Label: Polydor; Formats: CD, cassette | 1 | 49 | — | — | 68 | 41 | — | — | 44 | 1 | — | | BPI: 3× Platinum |
| A Different Beat | Released: 28 October 1996; Label: Polydor; Formats: CD, cassette | 2 | 74 | 40 | 11 | 47 | 78 | — | 44 | 21 | 1 | — | | BPI: 3× Platinum |
| Where We Belong | Released: 25 May 1998; Label: Polydor; Formats: CD, cassette | 1 | 31 | 40 | 35 | 14 | 1 | 1 | 8 | 8 | 1 | 167 | | ARIA: Gold; BPI: 5× Platinum; BVMI: Gold; IFPI AUT: Gold; IFPI SWI: Gold; NVPI: Platinum |
| Brother | Released: 5 March 2010; Label: Polydor; Formats: CD, digital download | 1 | 34 | — | — | 55 | 50 | 7 | — | 88 | 1 | — | WW: 450,000; UK: 394,872 | IRMA: Platinum; BPI: Platinum |
| BZ20 | Released: 22 November 2013; Label: Rhino; Formats: CD, digital download | 7 | 85 | — | — | 35 | — | — | — | — | 6 | — | WW: 250,000; UK: 199,854 | BPI: Gold |
| Dublin to Detroit | Released: 21 November 2014; Label: East West; Formats: CD, digital download | 12 | 43 | — | — | — | — | — | — | 14 | 14 | — | | BPI: Silver |
| Thank You & Goodnight | Released: 16 November 2018; Label: Warner Music Group; Formats: CD, digital download | 10 | — | — | — | — | — | — | — | — | 6 | — | | BPI: Silver |
"—" denotes releases that did not chart or were not released

=== Compilation albums ===
| Title | Album details | Peak chart positions | | | | | | | | | Certifications | Sales |
| Title | Album details | IRE | AUS | AUT | GER | NLD | NZ | SWE | SWI | UK | Certifications | Sales |
|---|---|---|---|---|---|---|---|---|---|---|---|---|
| By Request | Released: 31 May 1999; Label: Polydor; Formats: CD, cassette | 1 | 3 | 4 | 4 | 3 | 1 | 4 | 5 | 1 | ARIA: Platinum; BPI: 6× Platinum; BVMI: Gold; IFPI SWI: Gold; NVPI: Platinum | UK: 1,814,966 |
| The Singles Collection '94–'99 | Released: 1999; Label: Polydor; Formats: CD | — | — | — | — | — | — | — | — | 129 | | |
| Ballads – The Love Song Collection | Released: 17 March 2003; Label: Polydor, Universal; Formats: CD, digital download | 50 | — | — | 88 | 63 | — | — | — | 6 | BPI: Gold | |
| Key to My Life: The Collection | Released: 30 January 2006; Label: Spectrum; Formats: CD, digital download | 54 | — | — | — | — | — | — | — | — | BPI: Silver | |
| The Silver Collection | Released: 31 May 2007; Label: Spectrum, Universal Music Catalogue; Formats: CD, digital download | 94 | — | — | — | — | — | — | — | — | | |
| Back Again... No Matter What | Released: 13 October 2008; Label: Polydor; Formats: CD, digital download | 3 | 30 | 68 | 48 | — | — | — | 92 | 4 | IRMA: 2× Platinum; BPI: 2× Platinum | |
| B-Sides & Rarities | Released: 13 October 2008; Label: Polydor; Formats: Digital download | — | — | — | — | — | — | — | — | 34 | | |
| Love Me for a Reason – The Collection | Released: 17 February 2014; Label: Spectrum, Polydor, UMC; Formats: CD, digital download | — | — | — | — | — | — | — | — | — | | |
| No Matter What – The Essential | Released: 14 April 2017; Label: Spectrum, Polydor, UMC; Formats: CD, digital download | — | — | — | — | — | — | — | — | 95 | BPI: Silver | |
"—" denotes releases that did not chart or were not released

== Singles ==
List of singles, with selected chart positions and certifications, showing year released and album name
| Single | Year | Peak chart positions | | | | | | | | | | Certifications | Album |
| Single | Year | IRE | AUS | AUT | FRA | GER | NLD | NZ | SWE | SWI | UK | Certifications | Album |
|---|---|---|---|---|---|---|---|---|---|---|---|---|---|
| "Working My Way Back to You" | 1994 | 3 | — | — | — | — | — | — | — | — | — | | Non-album single |
| "Love Me for a Reason" | 1994 | 1 | 48 | — | 28 | 47 | 7 | — | 28 | 15 | 2 | BPI: Platinum | Said and Done |
| "Key to My Life" | 1995 | 1 | 167 | — | — | 64 | 12 | — | — | — | 3 | BPI: Silver | Said and Done |
| "So Good" | 1995 | 1 | 179 | — | — | 69 | — | — | — | — | 3 | | Said and Done |
| "Father and Son" | 1995 | 1 | 2 | 18 | 11 | 15 | 7 | 25 | 28 | — | 2 | ARIA: Gold; BPI: Platinum | Said and Done |
| "Coming Home Now" | 1996 | 2 | — | — | — | — | — | — | — | — | 4 | BPI: Silver | Said and Done |
| "Words" | 1996 | 1 | 96 | 2 | 31 | 7 | 15 | — | 4 | 2 | 1 | BPI: Platinum; BVMI: Gold; IFPI AUT: Gold | A Different Beat |
| "A Different Beat" | 1996 | 2 | 42 | 37 | — | 31 | 78 | — | — | — | 1 | BPI: Silver | A Different Beat |
| "Isn't It a Wonder" | 1997 | 3 | 113 | — | — | 49 | 65 | — | 59 | — | 2 | BPI: Silver | A Different Beat |
| "Mystical Experience"^{[A]} | 1997 | — | — | — | — | — | — | — | — | — | — | | A Different Beat |
| "Picture of You" | 1997 | 2 | 39 | 23 | 15 | 32 | 27 | — | 22 | 23 | 2 | BPI: Platinum | Where We Belong |
| "Baby Can I Hold You"/"Shooting Star" | 1997 | 2 | 56 | 39 | 26 | 80 | 43 | 11 | 12 | 17 | 2 | BPI: Platinum | Where We Belong |
| "Te Garder Près De Moi" (featuring Alliage) | 1997 | — | — | — | 3 | — | — | — | — | — | 90 | | Non-album single |
| "All That I Need" | 1998 | 1 | 102 | — | 91 | 51 | 38 | — | 7 | 36 | 1 | BPI: Silver | Where We Belong |
| "No Matter What" | 1998 | 1 | 5 | 3 | 43 | 2 | 1 | 1 | 2 | 2 | 1 | ARIA: Platinum; BPI: 2× Platinum; BVMI: Platinum; IFPI AUT: Gold; IFPI SWI: Gold; NVPI: 2× Platinum | Where We Belong |
| "All the Time in the World"^{[A]} | 1998 | — | — | — | — | — | — | — | — | — | — | | Where We Belong |
| "I Love the Way You Love Me" | 1998 | 2 | — | — | — | 50 | 39 | 1 | 17 | 43 | 2 | BPI: Gold | Where We Belong |
| "When the Going Gets Tough" | 1999 | 2 | — | — | 71 | — | — | — | — | — | 1 | BPI: Platinum | By Request |
| "You Needed Me" | 1999 | 2 | — | 38 | — | 36 | 16 | 1 | 21 | 29 | 1 | BPI: Gold; RMNZ: Gold | By Request |
| "Every Day I Love You" | 1999 | 1 | — | — | — | 41 | 34 | 24 | 13 | 56 | 3 | BPI: Silver | The Singles Collection 1994–1999 |
| "Love You Anyway" | 2008 | 3 | 111 | — | — | 30 | — | — | — | — | 5 | | Back Again...No Matter What |
| "Better" | 2008 | 26 | — | — | — | — | — | — | — | — | 22 | | Back Again...No Matter What |
| "Gave It All Away" (with Stephen Gately) | 2010 | 1 | 42 | — | — | — | — | 21 | — | — | 9 | BPI: Silver | Brother |
| "Love Is a Hurricane" | 2010 | 39 | — | — | — | — | — | — | — | — | 44 | | Brother |
| "Love Will Save the Day" | 2013 | 42 | 156 | — | — | 59 | — | — | — | — | 39 | | BZ20 |
| "Light Up the Night" | 2014 | — | — | — | — | — | — | — | — | — | — | | BZ20 |
| "Who We Are" | 2014 | — | — | — | — | — | — | — | — | — | — | | BZ20 |
| "Dream" (with Stephen Gately) | 2018 | — | — | — | — | — | — | — | — | — | — | | Thank You & Goodnight |
| "Because" | 2018 | — | — | — | — | — | — | — | — | — | — | | Thank You & Goodnight |
| "Love" | 2018 | — | — | — | — | — | — | — | — | — | — | | Thank You & Goodnight |
| "Normal Boy" | 2018 | — | — | — | — | — | — | — | — | — | — | | Thank You & Goodnight |
"—" denotes releases that did not chart or were not released

- ^{^[A]} Only released in the United States.

== Video albums ==
| Title | Details | Notes |
|---|---|---|
| Said and Done | Released: 16 October 1995; Label: Polygram International; Format: VHS | |
| Live at Wembley | Released: 23 September 1996; Label: Polygram International; Format: VHS | Features live concert from Wembley Arena. |
| Something Else | Released: 29 September 1997; Label: Polygram International; Format: VHS | |
| Live - Where We Belong | Released: 16 November 1998; Label: Polygram International; Format: VHS | Features live concert from the Manchester Arena. |
| By Request | Released: 31 May 1999; Label: Polygram International; Format: VHS | Features interview about the time of the band and videos so far in the history of the band. |
| Dublin - Live by Request | Released: 20 November 1999; Label: Polygram International; Format: VHS, DVD | Features live concert from the RDS Arena in Ireland. |
| Boyzone 2000 - Live at the Point | Released: 17 April 2000; Label: Polygram International; Format: VHS, DVD | Features the last concert before break from the point theatre, Dublin on 10 January 2000. |
| Live and Behind the Scenes | Released: 26 May 2008; Label: Polygram International; Format: DVD | |
| Back Again... No Matter What - Live 2008 | Released: 13 October 2008; Label: Universal; Format: DVD | Features the live concert from the Manchester Arena. |
| Back Again... No Matter What | Released: 13 October 2008; Studio: Universal; Format: DVD | Features 16 music videos, including all the number one hits, as well as live performances and behind-the-scenes film footage and photos. |
| Brother Tour - Live | Released: 2013; Label: Universal; Format: DVD | Features the live concert from the Brother Tour from the O2 Arena in London and the CD from the BZ20 Tour. |

== Music videos ==
| Year | Video |
|---|---|
| 1994 | "Working My Way Back to You" |
| 1994 | "Love Me for a Reason" |
| 1995 | "Key to My Life" |
| 1995 | "So Good" |
| 1995 | "Father and Son" |
| 1996 | "Coming Home Now" |
| 1996 | "Words" |
| 1996 | "A Different Beat" |
| 1997 | "Isn't It a Wonder" |
| 1997 | "Mystical Experience" (featuring Enrique Iglesias) |
| 1997 | "Picture of You" (From the motion picture Bean) |
| 1997 | "Baby Can I Hold You" |
| 1997 | "Te Garder Pres De Moi" (featuring Alliage) |
| 1998 | "All That I Need" |
| 1998 | "No Matter What" |
| 1998 | "All the Time in the World" |
| 1998 | "I Love the Way You Love Me" |
| 1998 | "Sweetest Thing" (with U2); Cameo appearance |
| 1999 | "When the Going Gets Tough" |
| 1999 | "You Needed Me" |
| 1999 | "Every Day I Love You" |
| 2008 | "Love You Anyway" |
| 2008 | "Better" |
| 2010 | "Gave It All Away" |
| 2010 | "Love Is a Hurricane" |
| 2013 | "Love Will Save the Day" |
| 2014 | "Light Up the Night" |
| 2014 | "Reach Out (I'll Be There)" |
| 2018 | "Because" |
| 2018 | "Love" |
