= Who We Are =

Who We Are may refer to:

== Music ==
=== Albums ===
- Who We Are (Hope Partlow album) or the title song, 2005
- Who We Are (Lifehouse album) or the title song, 2007
- Who We Are (Flyleaf EP), 2013
- Who We Are (AHOF EP), 2025
- Who We Are, by Ex-Idols, 1998

=== Songs ===
- "Who We Are" (Imagine Dragons song), 2013
- "Who We Are" (Switchfoot song), 2013
- "Who We Are", by All Things New from The Good News, 2015
- "Who We Are", by Boyzone from BZ20, 2013
- "Who We Are", by Camel from I Can See Your House from Here, 1979
- "Who We Are", by Hope Partlow from the album Who We Are, released in 2005. It was also covered by the Cheetah Girls for their album TCG in 2007
- "Who We Are", by Jessica Simpson, 2010
- "Who We Are", by Jessika ft. Jenifer Brening, representing San Marino in the Eurovision Song Contest 2018
- "Who We Are", by Machine Head from Unto the Locust, 2011
- "Who We Are", by Rebecca, competing in Melodi Grand Prix 2018
- "Who We Are", by Red from Until We Have Faces, 2011
- "Who We Are", by Uncle Kracker from Midnight Special, 2012

== Other uses ==
- "Who We Are" (Private Practice), a television episode
- Who We Are: A Citizen's Manifesto, a 2009 book by Rudyard Griffiths

== See also ==
- This Is Who We Are (disambiguation)
