= Brother Tour =

2011 concert tour by Boyzone

- Tour by Boyzone
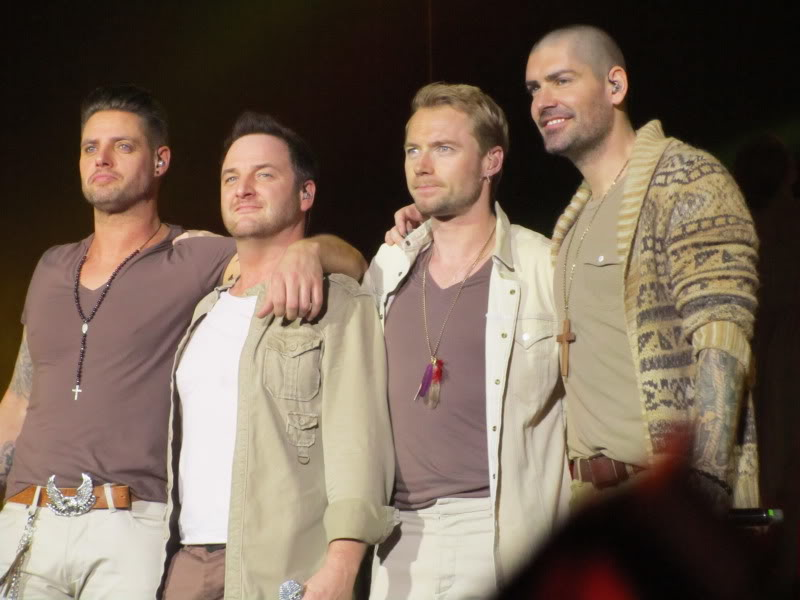
- Associated album: Brother
- Start date: 21 February 2011
- End date: 27 August 2011
- Legs: 1
- No. of shows: 25 in UK and Ireland

Boyzone concert chronology
- Better Tour (2009); Brother Tour (2011); BZ20 Tour (2013–15; 2017)

The Brother Tour was the first tour by Irish boy band Boyzone following the death of Stephen Gately.

== Background ==
At first the band were uncertain about promoting Brother but due to the album's success they decided to go on tour. The act included their entire discography as well as the newer songs from the brother album. They promoted the tour on various television shows. The band attempted to have a hologram of Stephen Gately but this wasn't possible.

== Show incidents and events ==
Keith Duffy fell through a trap door at the Cardiff show but he continued the performance. A subsequent check at the hospital revealed nothing broken.

== Support acts ==
- Barbarellas
- Wonderland – (Select dates)
- Guy Sebastian – (Select dates)
- The Saturdays – (Edinburgh)
- Shayne Ward – (Inverness)

A Huge contribution to the background and lead vocals has come from backing vocalist Jo Garland who has sung with Ronan Keating in his solo ventures since 2001 and with Boyzone since 2008, her vocals have been more prominent often covering for vocals that Stephen Gately sung.

== Setlist ==
1. Too Late for Hallelujah
2. Love Is a Hurricane
3. Picture of You
4. All That I Need
5. Ruby
6. Words
7. When the Going Gets Tough
8. Gave It All Away
9. Better
10. One More Song
11. Til the Sun Goes Down
12. Love Me for a Reason
13. No Matter What
14. You Needed Me
15. Love You Anyway
16. Lovin' Each Day
17. Let Your Wall Fall Down
18. Right Here Waiting
19. Baby Can I Hold You
20. Life Is a Rollercoaster

== Tour dates ==
Date	City	Country	Venue
21 February 2011	Liverpool	England	Echo Arena Liverpool
22 February 2011	Cardiff	Wales	Cardiff International Arena
23 February 2011	Cardiff	Wales	Cardiff International Arena
24 February 2011	Cardiff	Wales	Cardiff International Arena
26 February 2011	London	England	Wembley Arena
27 February 2011	Sheffield	England	Motorpoint Arena Sheffield
1 March 2011	Newcastle	England	Metro Radio Arena
2 March 2011	Birmingham	England	LG Arena
3 March 2011	Nottingham	England	Capital FM Arena
5 March 2011	Manchester	England	Evening News Arena
6 March 2011	Brighton	England	Brighton Centre
7 March 2011	Brighton	England	Brighton Centre
8 March 2011	London	England	The O_{2} Arena
10 March 2011	Aberdeen	Scotland	AECC
11 March 2011	Aberdeen	Scotland	AECC
12 March 2011	Glasgow	Scotland	SECC
13 March 2011	Glasgow	Scotland	SECC
15 March 2011	Dublin	Ireland	The O_{2}
16 March 2011	Killarney	Ireland	INEC
17 March 2011	Castlebar	Ireland	Royal Theatre
18 March 2011	Belfast	Northern Ireland	Odyssey Arena
5 August 2011	Suffolk	England	Newmarket Nights
6 August 2011	Edinburgh	Scotland	Hopetoun House
7 August 2011	Lytham St Annes	England	Lytham Prom Festival
27 August 2011	Inverness	Scotland	Northern Meeting Park

=== Box office score date ===
Venue	City	Tickets sold / available	Gross revenue
Echo Arena	Liverpool	7,046 / 7,340 (96%)	$397,989
Motorpoint Arena	Cardiff	10,200 / 10,800 (94%)	$556,785
Motorpoint Arena	Sheffield	8,905 / 9,700 (92%)	$501,937
Metro Radio Arena	Newcastle	7,002 / 7,520 (93%)	$385,555
Wembley Arena	London	9,897 / 10,500 (94%)	$558,557
LG Arena	Birmingham	9,537 / 10,600 (90%)	$533,755
Capital FM Arena	Nottingham	6,800 / 6,800 (100%)	$367,895
Evening News Arena	Manchester	11,261 / 11,500 (97%)	$638,835
Brighton Centre	Brighton	6,281 / 6,281 (100%)	$358,444
The O2 Arena	London	10,020 / 10,500 (95%)	$584,427
Press & Journal Arena	Aberdeen	7,046 / 7,360 (96%)	$394,727
SECC	Glasgow	12,102 / 14,212 (85%)	$649,561
The O2	Dublin	6,097 / 6,500 (94%)	$448,153
INEC	Killarney	1,101 / 1,101 (100%)	$67,072
Royal Theatre	Castlebar	858 / 1,000 (86%)	$52,298
Odyssey Arena	Belfast	8,500 / 8,500 (100%)	$477,204
Newmarkets nights	Suffolk	10,000 / 10,000 (100%)	$731,778
Hopetoun House	Edinburgh	8,000 / 8,000 (100%)	$455,428
Lyntham Prom Festival	Lancashire	7,000 / 8,000 (100%)	$438,293
Northern Meeting Park	Inverness	6,500 / 6,500 (100%)	$406,991
TOTAL		154,153 / 162,714 (94.73%)	$9,005,684/£6,047,289
