= Better Tour =

- Tour by Boyzone
- Associated album: Back Again... No Matter What
- Start date: May 24, 2009
- End date: June 27, 2009

Boyzone concert chronology
- Back Again... No Matter What Tour (2008); Better Tour (2009); Brother Tour (2011)

The Better Tour was a reunion tour by Irish boy band, Boyzone and the last one to feature Stephen Gately. They played arenas all over the UK and Germany. The tour finished with 3 dates in Germany on the 25th, 26th and 27 June.

== Background ==
The tour was announced in 2008.

== Support acts ==
- Eoghan Quigg
- Mark Read

== Setlist ==
According to the 22 June show:

1. Love You Anyway
2. Picture of You
3. Must Have Been High
4. Isn't It a Wonder
5. And I
6. Father and Son
7. Everyday I Love You
8. Single Ladies - Beyoncé (Stephen solo)
9. Queen Medley: I Want to Break Free, Under Pressure, We Will Rock You, It's a Kind of Magic, Bohemian Rhapsody
10. Time After Time (Ronan solo)
11. When the Going Gets Tough
12. Better
13. You Needed Me
14. Can't Stop Thinking About You
15. Love Me for a Reason
16. No Matter What
17. Life is a Rollercoaster
18. Words
19. Baby Can I Hold You
20. A Different Beat

== Tour dates ==
Date	City	Country	Venue
May 24, 2009	Belfast	Northern Ireland	Odyssey Arena
May 25, 2009	Belfast	Northern Ireland	Odyssey Arena
May 26, 2009	Dublin	Ireland	The O_{2}
May 27, 2009	Dublin	Ireland	The O_{2}
May 29, 2009	London	England	Wembley Arena
May 30, 2009	London	England	Wembley Arena
June 1, 2009	Cardiff	Wales	Cardiff International Arena
June 2, 2009	Cardiff	Wales	Cardiff International Arena
June 6, 2009	Sheffield	England	Motorpoint Arena Sheffield
June 7, 2009	Nottingham	England	Trent FM Arena
June 9, 2009	Newcastle	England	Metro Radio Arena
June 10, 2009	Newcastle	England	Metro Radio Arena
June 12, 2009	Glasgow	Scotland	Scottish Exhibition and Conference Centre
June 13, 2009	Glasgow	Scotland	Scottish Exhibition and Conference Centre
June 15, 2009	Birmingham	England	National Indoor Arena
June 16, 2009	Birmingham	England	National Indoor Arena
June 17, 2009	Liverpool	England	Echo Arena Liverpool
June 19, 2009	Manchester	England	Manchester Evening News Arena
June 20, 2009	Manchester	England	Manchester Evening News Arena
June 22, 2009	London	England	The O_{2} Arena
June 23, 2009	London	England	The O_{2} Arena
June 25, 2009	Hamburg	Germany	Color Line Arena
June 26, 2009	Oberhausen	Germany	König Pilsener Arena
June 27, 2009	Mannheim	Germany	SAP Arena
August 5, 2009	Newmarket	England	Newmarket Racecourse
August 6, 2009	Surrey	England	Sandown Park Racecourse
August 14, 2009	Newmarket	England	Newmarket Racecourse
