= Love Me for a Reason – The Collection =

Compilation album by Boyzone
- Released: 17 February 2014
- Recorded: 1994–2010
- Genre: Pop, pop rock
- Length: 69:30
- Label: Spectrum
- Producer: Greg Wells

Boyzone chronology
BZ20 (2013)	''Love Me for a Reason – The Collection'' (2014)	Dublin to Detroit (2014)

Love Me for a Reason – The Collection is the seventh compilation album by Irish boy band Boyzone. It was released on 17 February 2014.

== Track listing ==
Standard edition
No.	Title	Writer(s)	Producer(s)	Length
1.	"Love Me for a Reason"	David Jones, Johnny Bristol, Wade Brown	Ray Hedges	3:39
2.	"No Matter What"	Andrew Lloyd Webber, Jim Steinman, Nigel Wright	Webber, Steinman, Wright	4:32
3.	"Baby Can I Hold You"	Tracy Chapman	Stephen Lipson	3:15
4.	"Isn't It a Wonder"	Keating, Hedges, Brannigan	Hedges	3:30
5.	"Father and Son" (Live)	Cat Stevens	Ray Hedges	2:56
6.	"Picture of You"	Ronan Keating, Nigel Kennedy, Paul Watkins, Paul Wilson	Absolute	3:28
7.	"Arms of Mary"	Iain Sutherland	Jon Douglas	2:48
8.	"You Flew Away"	Stephen Gately	Jon Douglas	4:25
9.	"Coming Home Now" (Steve Jervier Mix)	Keating, Keith Duffy, Mikey Graham, Shane Lynch, Stephen Gately	Ray Hedges	3:47
10.	"A Different Beat" (Live)	Keating, Hedges, Brannigan, Keith Duffy, Shane Lynch, Stephen Gately	Hedges	4:10
11.	"Don't Stop Looking for Love"	Billy Mann	Jon Douglas	4:12
12.	"All the Time in the World"	Desmond Child, Damon Robbins, Victoria Stephenson	Mike Mangini	4:15
13.	"Key to My Life" (Unlocked mix)	Keating, Hedges, Brannigan, Graham, Gately	Ray Hedges	3:45
14.	"You Needed Me"	Randy Goodrum	Mac	3:29
15.	"Melting Pot"	Roger Cook, Roger Greenway	Phil Harding, Ian Curnow, Hedges	3:33
16.	"When All Is Said and Done"	Keating, Duffy, Graham, Lynch, Gately	Ray Hedges	3:05
17.	"One Kiss at a Time"	Keating, Rogers, Sturken	Rogers, Sturken	4:06
18.	"So They Told Me"	Steven Greenberg, Mark Hudson	Mangini	3:28
19.	"Love Is a Hurricane"	Gregg Alexander, Danielle Brisebois	Wells	3:30
20.	"Can't Stop Me"	Gately, Hedges, Brannigan	Ray Hedges	3:08

== Charts ==
Chart (2014)	Peak position
Belgian Albums (Ultratop Flanders)	44
Taiwanese Albums (Five Music)	5
