= Fatal Deviation =

1998 Irish film

- VHS cover
- Directed by: Simon Linscheid; Shay Casserley; James Bennett
- Written by: Simon Linscheid
- Story by: James Bennett
- Produced by: James Bennett; Justin Harmon
- Starring: James Bennett; Mikey Graham; Colin Hamilton; Justin Harmon; Michael Regan
- Cinematography: Shay Casserley
- Edited by: Simon Linscheid
- Distributed by: Rising Sun Productions
- Release date: 1998
- Running time: 76 minutes
- Country: Ireland
- Language: English
- Budget: IR£8,900

Fatal Deviation is a 1998 Irish low-budget cult film produced and set in Trim, County Meath, Ireland. It serves the distinction of being Ireland's first full-length martial arts film. The film stars, and was conceived by, real-life martial arts enthusiast James Bennett.

The film was panned by critics and many have considered this film to be one of the worst films ever made. The film went straight to video without a theatrical release.

== Plot ==
Fatal Deviation tells the story of Jimmy Bennett, a disenfranchised young man trying to rebuild his life. When returning home after a ten year stay in St. Claude's Reform School, he aims to discover who he is, what it is he should do and what happened to his father. Shortly after his return to his hometown, Jimmy gets on the wrong side of a local gang, beating up two of its members who had been harassing local shop worker Nicola, in an attempt to force her to date gang member Mikey (played by Mikey Graham of Boyzone fame). The fight is witnessed by a monk in a local secret kung-fu group, with mysterious links to Jimmy's father. This order organises the Bealtaine tournament, an underground 'no-rules' fighting tournament, in which Jimmy is invited to partake.

The gang leader, Loughlan, who happens to be the father of the aforementioned Mikey, decides they should add Jimmy to their group ("Why not? Wouldn't it be ironic to have the son of the man I killed working for us?"). When Jimmy refuses to join them, they turn on him. Loughlan arranges for henchman 'Seagull' to return from his successful mission in Hong Kong on a direct flight to Trim Aerodrome in order to take part in the festival. Meanwhile Mikey has Nicola kidnapped and leaves Jimmy a note warning him to "Loose [sic] or else".

Jimmy's fortunes begin to change when he is brought under the tutelage of a group of mysterious local monks who had trained his father, a martial arts champion, many years before. Under the guidance of the mysterious head monk, Jimmy undertakes an intensive training programme in preparation for the tournament. Jimmy goes on to reach the final, where he faces Seagull. After remembering that he had witnessed Loughlan kill his father with a sword in front of him back when he was a child, he defeats Seagull with a well-timed use of the mysterious "Fatal Deviation" move as taught to him by the head monk.

Having triumphed over Seagull, Jimmy carries out a one-man assault on the gang's junkyard base, resulting in a massive shootout which culminates with Jimmy killing Mikey and saving Nicola. On hearing of his son's death, Loughlan seeks bloody vengeance ("You killed my son, now I'm going to kill you, just as I killed your father"), but Jimmy ultimately dispatches him too. Jimmy reunites with his girlfriend and looks forward to a happy and peaceful future in Trim.

== Cast ==
- James Bennett as Jimmy Bennett
- Mikey Graham as Mikey
- Michael Regan as Loughlan
- Nicola O'Sullivan as Nicola
- Colin Hamilton as Seagull
- Justin Harmon as Man in Bath
- Barry Smith as Henchman #1
- Peter Crinion as Henchman #2
- Paudie Greene as Henchman #3
- Johnny Murray as Main Monk
- Mattie Finnigan as Tournament Monk
- Graham Geraghty as Celebrity Contestant in White shirt #1

== Production ==
James Bennett had been tipped off that Hong Kong film producers were interested in working with him, but wanted to see some of his work before offering him a project. Fatal Deviation was essentially his audition tape. Filming began in September 1997 with no budget in place and Bennett simply asked his friends to become involved with making the film. He later stated that while he had no film making experience, he made the film as a love letter to martial arts and action movies and admitted that it fell into the "so bad it's good" category. Bennett was a fan of both Jean-Claude Van Damme and Steven Seagal, both of whom he would eventually work with. As a result, the film is heavily influenced by films featuring the two stars, particularly Hard Target and Bloodsport.

Filmed entirely on location in and around Trim, these included SuperValu supermarket and The Boyne Community School.

The car crash towards the end of the film was not intended, but was included for dramatic effect. The crash is shown in a post credits sequence, along with other bloopers taken during the filming. Production started using a Sony Hi8 camera under the direction of Simon Linscheid (who was destroyed during filming) and all scenes were reshot when Shay Casserley took over as Director and Camera operator shooting the film on SVHS. Casserley, who had experience making promotional, wedding and music videos, treated the film as a professional project.

Michael Regan was a long serving solicitor in Trim and helped to fund the production in return for appearing in the film. Professional footballer Graham Geraghty made his acting debut in the film, playing one of the contestants during the martial arts tournament.

== Release ==
The film was released in 1998 on VHS and home media without a theatrical release.

== Reception ==
In 2010, Luke McKinney of Cracked.com labeled the film "the worst film ever made." The Irish Post named it the worst Irish film of all time, and the Irish Independent wrote that it is "now regarded as one of the worst films ever made". Entertainment.ie placed it on its list of "10 So Bad They're Good Movies You Need To See Before You Die" and Comic Book Resources described it as "one of the worst commercial movies ever made."

== Sequel ==
A sequel titled Fatal Deviation: Krakatoa was announced by James P. Bennett in 2020 and was supposed to have a much larger budget. In May 2022, Bennett reported that a film titled Triple Deviation will be made instead in 2023, and will feature a "world famous action star".

== See also ==
- List of 20th century films considered the worst
- Moving Target - another martial arts movie filmed in Ireland featuring James Bennett
