= Brother (Boyzone album) =

Studio album by Boyzone
- Released: 5 March 2010
- Recorded: 2007–2009
- Studio: Sarm Studios
- Genre: Pop, pop rock
- Length: 46:40
- Label: Polydor
- Producer: Greg Wells, Steve Lipson

Boyzone chronology
B-Sides & Rarities (2008)	Brother (2010)	BZ20 (2013)

Singles from Brother
- 1. "Gave It All Away" Released: 1 March 2010; 2. "Love Is a Hurricane" Released: 17 May 2010

Brother is the fourth studio album by Irish boy band Boyzone, released on 5 March 2010 in Ireland. It is the band's first studio album in 12 years since Where We Belong (1998). The album is named in memory of member Stephen Gately, who died five months before its release. Gately's vocals appear on the tracks "Gave It All Away" and "Stronger".

Upon its release, Brother received favorable reviews from music critics. The album debuted at number one in Ireland and the United Kingdom. As of October 2013, the album had sold 450,000 copies worldwide.

== Background ==
It became their first studio album released in 12 years since their last album, Where We Belong released in 1998. This album is named in memory of member Stephen Gately, who died five months before its release. However, Gately's vocals did appear on the band's songs "Gave It All Away" and "Stronger", making it the final album to feature Gately's vocals and is released posthumously. Unlike their first three albums, none of the tracks were written or co-written by the group members.

The album was recorded in 2009, and was released on 5 March 2010 in Republic of Ireland and was released on 8 March 2010 in the United Kingdom. The album contains the single "Gave It All Away", released as a tribute to Gately and also features his vocals on the song "Stronger". The record entered the UK Album Chart at number 1 on 14 March 2010, making it Boyzone's fourth consecutive studio album to reach number 1 in the UK. The album also reached the number 1 slot in Ireland, resulting in the same achievement for all four albums, cementing the band's reputation as being one of the most successful boyband/male groups of all time in the UK and Ireland. On 28 March 2010, the album reclaimed the top spot in the UK album charts after a week at number 3. On the same day, the single "Gave It All Away" climbed 19 places to number 10 on the UK singles chart. 'Love Is a Hurricane' was the second and final single from 'Brother', and was released on 17 May.

== Promotion ==
"Gave It All Away" was performed on the Australian version of the X Factor on 11 October 2010. The band toured the album in the UK and Ireland during February and March 2011 - the Brother Tour.

== Critical reception ==
Professional ratings
Review scores
Source	Rating
Allmusic	3/5 stars
BBC	(favourable)
Daily Express	4/5 stars
Entertainment.ie	2.5/5 stars
Funky.co.uk	4/5 stars
Virgin Media	4/5 stars

The album received favorable and positive reviews from most music critics. Jason Birchmeier from Allmusic said that: "Brother is a safe and carefully crafted album". And has noticed that the album is "a ballad-heavy effort with lots of piano melodies, string arrangements, and grandiose choruses". Further, he gave positive reaction for the songs 'Gave It All Away', calling it "a good song with glimmers of greatness" and 'Love Is a Hurricane' saying that "is the most impressive track on the album, showcase for Keating that marks the high point of Brother".

Other tracks include 'Ruby' and 'Right Here Waiting'. Simon Gage from Daily Express said that "The first album since the death of Stephen Gately last year, is a poignant outing for Boyzone and features the last recorded vocals of their 'brother'". He also said that: "The debut single Gave It All Away sets the tone for what is a much more grown-up album of songs that veer closer to adult rock than the sometimes cheesy pop we associate with Boyzone."

Mike Diver from BBC said that: “It’s soft about its edges, its lyrical content exclusively syrupy – but that’s fine, as at this stage in their career, pronounced progression was never a likely option". He also said that: "It’s sad, though, that Gately eulogy-of-sorts Gave It All Away is so very poor". But with ballads dominating, "Brother is a Boyzone album for Boyzone fans". Lauren Murphy from Entertainment.ie said that: "Employing some known songwriters of the pop world makes Boyzone's fourth album 'Brother' a less amateur sounding affair than the now quartet's usual material". But she liked some parts of the album, saying that it "is actually solid, occasionally even likeable adult-orientated pop".

== Commercial performance ==
The album topped the UK Albums Chart, while at No. 1 for three weeks, it was their fifth UK and Irish No. 1 album and Ireland albums chart where it charted in the top 75 for 17 weeks and the first single was a number 1 single on the Irish Singles Chart and a top 10 hit on the UK Singles Chart. As of December 2014, Brother has sold 394,872 copies in the UK.

== Track listing ==
Standard edition
No.	Title	Writer(s)	Producer(s)	Length
1.	"Gave It All Away" (lead vocals: Gately, Keating)	Mika	Greg Wells, Ollie Jacobs^{[a]}	4:27
2.	"Love Is a Hurricane" (lead vocals: Keating, Duffy)	Gregg Alexander, Danielle Brisebois	Wells	3:30
3.	"Ruby" (lead vocals: Graham, Keating)	Shelly Poole, Andy Hill, Terry Martin	Wells	4:27
4.	"Too Late for Hallelujah" (lead vocals: Keating, Graham)	Carl Falk, Sharon Vaughn, Don Mescall	Wells	3:38
5.	"Separate Cars" (lead vocals: Keating)	John Green, Jim Irvin, Julian Emery, Jack McManus	Wells	3:11
6.	"One More Song" (lead vocals: Keating)	Greg Wells, Nasri	Wells	3:33
7.	"Right Here Waiting" (lead vocals: Lynch, Keating)	Chris Braide, Hill	Wells	3:38
8.	"Nothing Without You" (lead vocals: Keating)	Catt Gravitt, Tom Shapiro, Michael Busbee	Wells	3:20
9.	"'Til the Sun Goes Down" (lead vocals: Graham)	Jez Ashurst, Emma Rohan	Wells	3:45
10.	"Time" (lead vocals: Keating)	Wells, Matt Hales, Kim Oliver	Wells	4:10
11.	"Let Your Wall Fall Down" (lead vocals: Keating)	Peter-John Vettese, Sean Conlon	Wells	5:11
12.	"Stronger" (lead vocals: Keating, Gately)	Craig Wiseman, Karen Poole, Steve Lipson	Lipson	3:50
Total length:				46:40

Japanese edition (bonus tracks)
No.	Title	Writer(s)	Producer(s)	Length
13.	"Love You Anyway" (lead vocals: Keating)	Ronan Keating, Nick Atkinson	Jarrad Rogers	3:21
14.	"Better" (lead vocals: Keating, Gately)	Tom Baxter, Sam Semple	Stephen Lipson	3:36
15.	"Can't Stop Thinking About You" (lead vocals: Keating)	James Bourne, Steve Mac	Steve Mac	3:32
16.	"Life Is a Rollercoaster" (Live; lead vocals: Keating, Duffy)	Keating, Gregg Alexander, Rick Nowels	Gregg Alexander, Rick Nowels	5:52

Notes

- ^{^[a]} signifies a vocal producer

Credits adapted from the liner notes of Brother.

== Personnel ==
- Ray Burmiston – photography
- Andy Caine – vocals
- Simon Emmett – cover photo
- Mark "Tufty" Evans – engineer
- Serban Ghenea – mixing
- John Hanes – assistant
- Mark Herman – design
- Ollie Jacobs – vocal producer
- Steve Lipson – guitar, producer, mixing, instrumentation
- Ian MacGregor – engineer
- Chris Nicoladies – drum programming
- Mark Plunkett – management
- Ash Soan – drums
- Peter-John Vetesse – engineer, choir arrangement
- Greg Wells – bass, guitar, piano, drums, producer, mixing
- Rob Wells – programming
- Craig Wiseman – guitar

== Chart positions ==
=== Weekly charts ===
Chart (2010)	Peak position
Australian Albums (ARIA)	34
Belgian Albums (Ultratop Wallonia)	20
Dutch Albums (MegaCharts)	50
European Albums Chart	9
German Albums (Offizielle Top 100)	55
Greek Albums (IFPI)	33
Irish Albums (IRMA)	1
New Zealand Albums (RIANZ)	7
Scottish Albums (OCC)	1
South Korean Albums (Gaon Chart)	28
Swiss Albums (Swiss Hitparade)	88
Taiwanese Albums (G-Music)	6
UK Albums (OCC)	1

=== Year-end charts ===
Chart (2010)	Position
UK Albums (OCC)	25

== Certifications ==
Region	Certification	Certified units/sales
Ireland (IRMA)	Platinum	15,000^{^}
United Kingdom (BPI)	Platinum	394,872
^{^} Shipments figures based on certification alone.
