= Love Will Save the Day (Boyzone song) =

Single by Boyzone

from the album BZ20
- Released: 8 November 2013
- Recorded: 2013
- Genre: Pop
- Length: 3:10
- Songwriters: Jez Ashurst, Viktoria Hansen
- Producers: Brian Rawling, Matt Furmidge, Paul Meehan

Boyzone singles chronology
"Love Is a Hurricane" (2010)	"Love Will Save the Day" (2013)	"Light Up the Night" (2014)

Music video
- "Love Will Save the Day" on YouTube

Love Will Save the Day is a song by Irish boy band Boyzone from their fifth studio album, BZ20. The song was written by Jez Ashurst and Viktoria Hansen. The song has sold over 30,000 copies.

== Background ==
On 24 September 2013, the band performed one of the new songs from their new album called "Love Will Save the Day" on The X Factor Australia.

It was announced on the same day that the new album will be released on 25 November 2013 and became available to pre-order from Amazon. The band premiered the song during a BBC Radio 2 broadcast on 11 October 2013 and the song will be available on download and CD on 17 November 2013.

== Promotion ==
Boyzone performed the song on The X Factor Australia live results show on 24 September.

Boyzone performed the song on The Jonathan Ross Show on 9 November. On 22 November, they performed on The Paul O'Grady Show. Further TV appearances include Loose Women and Lorraine. Boyzone sang two songs (‘Love Will Save The Day' and 'Everything I Own') from the new album on the Terry Wogan show on BBC Radio 2 on Sunday 17 November

== Music video ==
On 22 October 2013, the full video was uploaded to YouTube; it features footage from the group's Brother Tour along with a video shoot for the BZ20 album.

== Chart performance ==
In its first week in the UK Chart the song entered at number 39 with first week sales were at 7,118 followed by second week sales of 6,832, third week sales of 3,088 and fourth week sales of 3,343 totalling 20,381 copies.

== Track listing ==
- Digital download
1. "Love Will Save the Day" - 3:10

== Charts ==
Chart (2013)	Peak position
Australia (ARIA)	156
Belgium (Ultratip Bubbling Under Flanders)	28
Belgium (Ultratip Bubbling Under Wallonia)	43
Germany (GfK)	59
Ireland (IRMA)	42
Scottish Singles Sales (Official Charts)	28
UK Singles (Official Charts)	39
UK Airplay (Music Week)	26

== Release history ==
Country	Date	Format	Label
Australia	8 November 2013	Digital download	Rhino
Belgium	8 November 2013	Digital download	Rhino
Ireland	8 November 2013	Digital download	Rhino
Netherlands	8 November 2013	Digital download	Rhino
New Zealand	8 November 2013	Digital download	Rhino
United Kingdom	8 November 2013	Digital download	Rhino
