= Hope Partlow =

American singer (born 1988)

- Born: Amanda Hope Partlow; May 31, 1988 (age 38); Drummonds, Tennessee, U.S.
- Genres: Pop, rock
- Years active: 2002–present
- Labels: Virgin Records (2002-2005); Decca Records (2008-2009)
- Website: www.instagram.com/hippiehope

Amanda Hope Partlow (born May 31, 1988) is an American pop singer from Drummonds, Tennessee.

== Biography ==
Partlow grew up singing gospel and country songs in her native town. She was a popular act at the local Strand Theatre. While still in her early teens, a demo she and her family had self-produced, made its way to an aunt working as a songwriter in Nashville. Eventually, the recording found the ear of producer and Virgin CEO, Matt Serletic, and by the time Partlow was 14, she had signed her first contract.

Her first album, titled Who We Are, was released September 6, 2005. Her first on-screen national exposure was performing a song from the album on the September 9, 2005 edition of The Tonight Show with the song "Sick Inside".

Prior to the release of her album, her song, "Whatever Comes Our Way", was the theme to The WB comedy Living With Fran, starring Fran Drescher. In the summer of 2005, she toured with Jesse McCartney, acting as his open act.

In November 2005, as part of the label's restructuring, Virgin made the decision to drop Partlow's contract. Hope's music remained on iTunes, and she appeared on such outlets as teen network The N to promote her album. In 2007, The Cheetah Girls covered Hope's first single "Who We Are" on their album TCG.

In April 2007, Hope announced on her Myspace that she had teamed up with guitarist, Ryan Wilson to form a new duo act, Hope & Ryan. The new Myspace profile featured a demo by the two, titled "Try." Just three months later, Hope announced through a Myspace announcement that while seeking a female vocalist and musician to join her and Ryan, they found Sara Rachele and have now decided to become a trio, called The Love Willows. Since then, Sara has left the group.

On April 24, 2008 The Love Willows announced on Myspace that they have officially signed to Decca Records/Universal Music Group. Their first full-length album, titled Hey! Hey!, was released in August 2009 after the 2008 release of the single "Falling Faster" from the same album.

In May 2009, The Love Willows were booted from The Veronicas' American summer tour without reason. Myspace postings were exchanged between The Veronicas and Hope arguing the situation, with The Veronicas stating the Love Willows "were never promised an entire three months." The Love Willows were dropped from Decca shortly before the album's release on August 31, 2009.

The Love Willows released a song and video called "Hey Now Girls" in July 2014.

Hope split from Ryan not long after that and now lives in Nashville.

In August 2016, Hope posted a new recorded track called 'Anymore' on her personal Facebook page. You can find the song on soundcloud.

In August 2017, Hope got engaged to musician Jake Germany, who performs under the stage name PHANGS. He is currently signed to KIDINAKORNER Records.

== Discography ==
=== Albums ===
Album Information
Who We Are
- Released: September 6, 2005
- Format: CD
- U.S. sales: 10,000
- Chart positions: #45 Billboard Top Heatseekers
- Singles:
  - (2005) "Who We Are" (#25 Mediabase Pop Charts, #39 Billboard Adult Top 40)
  - (2005) "Sick Inside"
  - (2005) "Slow Down" (Digital Download)
  - (2005) "Who We Are (Saturday Night Mix)" (Digital Download)
