= Sara Rachele =

American folk singer

Sara Rachele (born 1988) is an American folk singer from Decatur, Georgia.

== Early life ==
The daughter of a baby-boomer painter and Italian-Croatian American immigrant, Rachele (pronounced ra-kelly) grew up in Decatur, GA.

== Music career ==
As a teen working for free cleaning out the cupboards at Atlanta acoustic venue Eddie's Attic, Rachele met musicians and writers, joining bands as a side-player. There Rachele met Hope Partlow, and dropped her college plans for a music career, although she eventually completed a degree at Berklee College of Music. The wurlitzer player of The Love Willows (Decca/Universal) returned to her hometown to track her first LP, Diamond Street, with bandmate and producer and guitarist of Ponderosa, Kris Sampson (New West Records.) Released on Angrygal Records, the album and her follow up 7-inch vinyl singles received acclaim in American Songwriter, Paste Magazine, and single "Don't Give Me Hell (feat. J. Thomas Hall)," (Normaltown Records) hit AAA, Americana, and Sirius XM charts. Her follow up cover of Cracker's "Low," produced by Nick Whitson, and dubbed "sublime," by Spin Magazine, pushed her into the mainstream alternative formats.

Rachele is currently writing and recording her sophomore solo LP, and lives with her dog, Hank Williams Sr. and her cat, Tom Selleck, splitting time between East Atlanta Village of Atlanta Georgia,and New York's East Village.

== Discography ==
- 2014 You Don't Move Me
- 2014 Don't Give Me Hell
- 2014 Never Come Around
- 2014 If You're Gone
- 2014 Strong as My Hands
- 2014 Listen, Judas
- 2014 Fade into You
- 2014 How Long Do I Wait
- 2014 Appalachian Rain
- 2015 Crazy Love
- 2015 Low
- 2015 Rebecca
- 2015 Sweet Man of Mine
- 2015 When The Fire Goes Out Tonight
- 2015 Still on My Mind
- 2016 Free From Love
- 2016 1971 Javelin
- 2017 Change Your Mind
- 2017 Tangled
- 2017 April Fool
- 2019 Fade into You
- 2019 Let Me Make It up to You
- 2019 Scorpio Moon
- 2019 Dream, Dream Love
- 2019 I Will Always Love You
- 2019 Anyone Who Had a Heart
- 2019 Bye Bye Baby, Bye Bye
- 2020 Sex and Candy
- 2020 Lover Can't You Just Get Over It
- 2020 Still Alive
- 2020 Michael Row the Boat Ashore
- 2022 T-T-Tonight
- 2022 Go South
