= Back Again... No Matter What Tour =

Better Tour
- Tour by Boyzone
- Start date: May 25, 2008
- End date: August 24, 2008

Boyzone concert chronology
- By Request Tour (1999-00); Back Again... No Matter What Tour (2008); Better Tour (2009)

The Back Again... No Matter What Tour was a concert tour by Boyzone, their first tour since the By Request Tour in 1999. They played to over 250,000 fans.

== Background ==
Boyzone returned in 2007 for a reunion performance on Children in Need. They subsequently announced a tour.

The Take That Ultimate tour inspired them.

The group sold 200,000 tickets for the tour within three hours and sold 20,000 tickets on the first day of them going on sale for their concert in the RDS Dublin. Keating told the Daily Star: "We've been taking it easy on the Guinness and been out for dinners and just a couple of drinks. We're taking the tour plans very seriously. We're all on diets and we've been training in the gym every day. I'm probably the fittest now that I've ever been. I think we all look better now than before. I can't wait to be back on the road and all the guys feel the same." The 29-date tour, taking in cities such as Cardiff, Newcastle, Liverpool, London at the O2 Arena and Wembley, Manchester, Birmingham, Glasgow, Aberdeen, Sheffield, Newcastle, Nottingham, Edinburgh Castle and the RDS in Dublin.

The tour began on 25 May 2008 at Belfast's Odyssey arena and finished at Carlisle Bitts Park on 23 August 2008. On 29 August 2008 Boyzone played alongside other acts such as Sandi Thom and Scouting For Girls at an event in Blackpool to switch on the Blackpool Illuminations, an annual event in the town. The event received coverage on BBC Radio 2.

== Set list ==
According to the 30th May 2008 show.

1. Picture of You
2. One Kiss at a Time
3. Isn't It a Wonder
4. All That I Need
5. And I
6. Words
7. Father and Son
8. Love Me for a Reason
9. Bright Eyes
10. Michael Jackson Medley (I Want You Back, Don't Stop 'til You Get Enough, Billie Jean, Bad, The Way You Make Me Feel, Black or White)
11. When You Say Nothing at All
12. When the Going Gets Tough
13. Baby Can I Hold You
14. You Needed Me
15. I Love the Way You Love Me
16. I Can't Stop Thinking About You
17. Life is a Rollarcoaster
18. A Different Beat
19. No Matter What
20. Melting Pot

== DVD Release ==
The dates from Manchester were used to make a DVD of the full concert which was released on the 13 October 2008.

== Tour dates ==
Date	City	Country	Venue
May 25, 2008	Belfast	Northern Ireland	Odyssey Arena
May 26, 2008	Belfast	Northern Ireland	Odyssey Arena
May 29, 2008	Cardiff	Wales	Cardiff International Arena
May 30, 2008	London	England	The O_{2} Arena
May 31, 2008	London	England	The O_{2} Arena
June 1, 2008	London	England	Wembley Arena
June 3, 2008	Nottingham	England	Trent FM Arena
June 4, 2008	Nottingham	England	Trent FM Arena
June 6, 2008	Cardiff	Wales	Cardiff International Arena
June 7, 2008	Cardiff	Wales	Cardiff International Arena
June 8, 2008	Cardiff	Wales	Cardiff International Arena
June 10, 2008	Birmingham	England	National Exhibition Centre
June 11, 2008	Birmingham	England	National Exhibition Centre
June 13, 2008	Manchester	England	Manchester Evening News Arena
June 14, 2008	Manchester	England	Manchester Evening News Arena
June 15, 2008	Liverpool	England	Echo Arena Liverpool
June 17, 2008	Newcastle	England	Metro Radio Arena
June 18, 2008	Newcastle	England	Metro Radio Arena
June 19, 2008	Sheffield	England	Motorpoint Arena Sheffield
June 20, 2008	Sheffield	England	Motorpoint Arena Sheffield
June 22, 2008	Glasgow	Scotland	Scottish Exhibition and Conference Centre
June 23, 2008	Glasgow	Scotland	Scottish Exhibition and Conference Centre
June 24, 2008	Glasgow	Scotland	Scottish Exhibition and Conference Centre
June 26, 2008	Aberdeen	Scotland	Aberdeen Exhibition and Conference Centre
June 28, 2008	Dublin	Ireland	RDS Arena
July 5, 2008	Hampshire	England	Broadlands
July 18, 2008	Edinburgh	Scotland	Edinburgh Castle
August 15, 2008	Newmarket	England	Newmarket Racecourse
August 16, 2008	Newbury	England	Newbury Racecourse
August 23, 2008	Carlisle	England	Carlisle Bitts Park
August 24, 2008	Carlisle	England	Carlisle Bitts Park
