= Tom Baxter =

English singer-songwriter

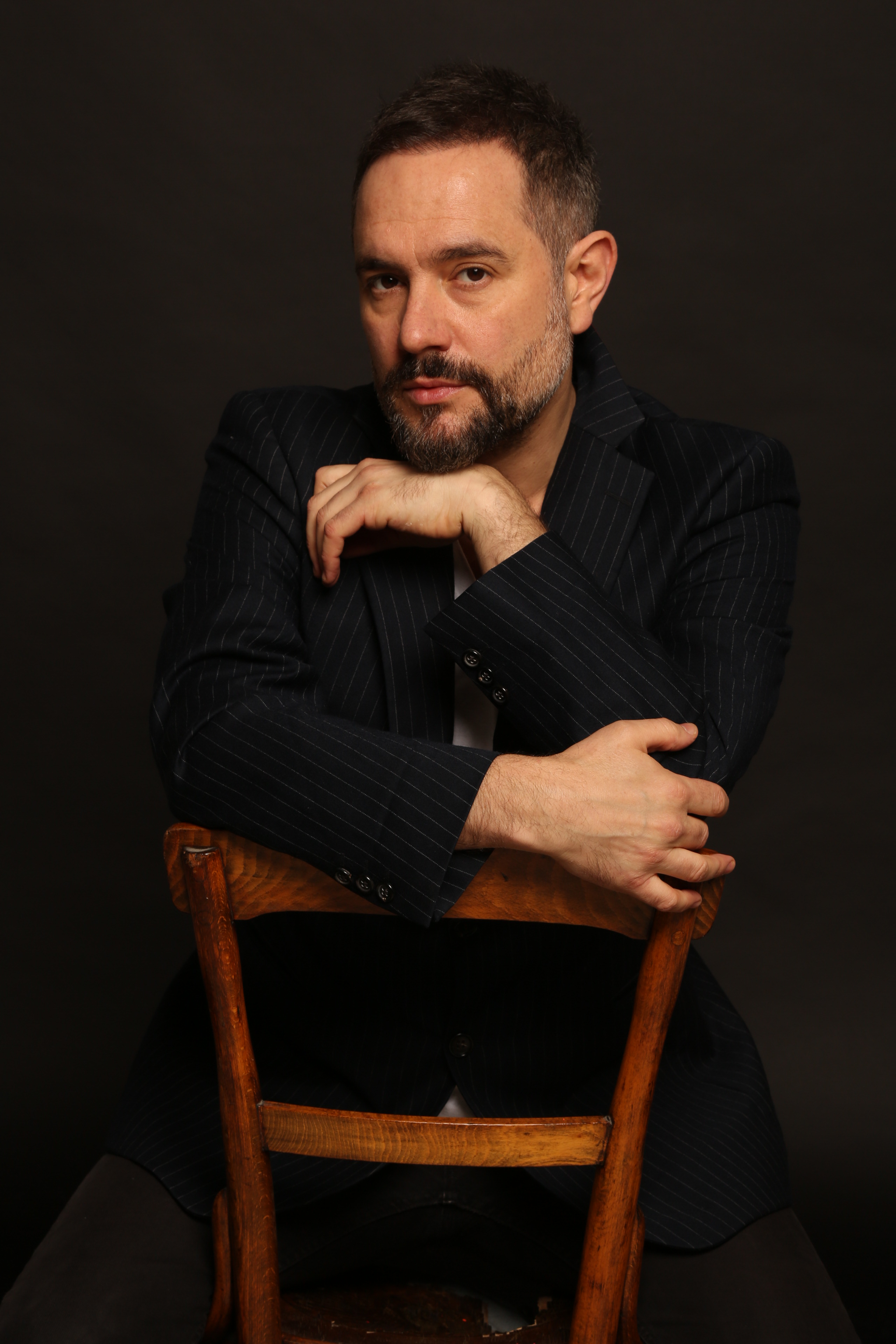
- Baxter in 2018
- Born: Thomas Baxter Gleave; Ipswich, Suffolk, England
- Occupation: Singer-songwriter
- Relatives: Charlie Winston (brother)
- Musical career
- Instruments: Vocals; guitar
- Years active: 2004–present
- Website: tombaxter.com

Thomas Baxter Gleave (born 29 October 1973) is an English singer-songwriter based in London. He was born in Ipswich, Suffolk, and grew up in Camborne, Cornwall. His brother is the France-based singer-songwriter Charlie Winston. As of 2026, he has released four EPs, four studio albums, one live record, and one soundtrack album.

== Career ==
Baxter released his debut, self-titled EP in May 2004, under Sony BMG. In July of that year, he issued a full-length studio album, titled Feather and Stone, recorded at Peter Gabriel's Real World Studios. This was followed by a headlining UK tour, and the record and entered the UK's Official Albums Charts Top 75 in August. Baxter continued to tour the UK and Ireland In 2009, the Welsh singer Shirley Bassey recorded a version of the song "Almost There" on her album The Performance.

In June 2007, Baxter released his second album, Skybound. The first single, "Better", came out in January 2008 and was used in the soundtrack to the motion picture Run Fatboy Run.

Baxter is credited as the songwriter on the song "Hope", released by the boy band Take That on their 2017 album, Wonderland. In 2018, he issued two studio albums: The Other Side of Blue and The Uncarved Block.

In 2022, Baxter performed at Night for Ukraine, a fundraising benefit for the Disasters Emergency Committee in support of people fleeing Ukraine following the Russian invasion, held at the Roundhouse in London. The event was organized by Fabien Riggall in collaboration with the Ukrainian pop duo Bloom Twins, and headlined by Bob Geldof.

In addition to making music, Baxter is also a painter.

== Discography ==
EPs

- e.p. (2004)
- This Boy (2004)
- My Declaration (2004)
- Golden EP (2012)

Studio albums

- Feather & Stone (2004)
- Skybound (2007)
- The Uncarved Block (2018)
- The Other Side of Blue (2018)

Live albums

- Live @ the Amadeus (2006)

Soundtrack albums

- COSTA RICA: Le réveil de la nature (2020)

Singles

- "Better" (2007)
- "Human" with Stefano Lentini (2024)
