= Light Up the Night (Boyzone song) =

Single by Boyzone

from the album BZ20
- Released: 10 February 2014
- Recorded: 2013
- Genre: Pop
- Length: 3:14
- Label: Rhino
- Songwriter(s): Josh Kear, Ed Hill
- Producer(s): Brian Rawling, Paul Meehan, Matt Furmidge

Boyzone singles chronology
"Love Will Save the Day" (2013)	"Light Up the Night" (2014)	"Dream" (2018)

Music video
- "Light Up the Night" on YouTube

Light Up the Night is a song by Irish boy band Boyzone from their fifth studio album, BZ20 (2013). The song was written by Josh Kear and Ed Hill, and was produced by Brian Rawling, Paul Meehan, and Matt Furmidge. It was released in February 2014 as the album's second and final single.

== Promotion ==
Boyzone performed the song on German TV channel Sat.1 on the 24 January 2014.

== Music video ==
On 15 January 2014, the music video was uploaded to YouTube. The video features Boyzone singing around a bonfire.

== Track listing ==
CD single

1. "Light Up the Night" (radio mix)
