= BZ20 Tour =

2013–17 concert tour by Boyzone

- Tour by Boyzone
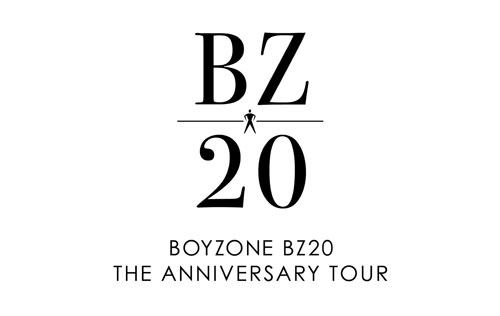
- Associated album: BZ20; Dublin to Detroit
- Start date: 28 November 2013
- End date: 16 September 2017
- Legs: 5
- No. of shows: 48

Boyzone concert chronology
- Brother Tour (2011); BZ20 Tour (2013–15; 2017); Thank You & Goodnight Tour (2018–19)

The BZ20 Tour was a tour by Irish boy band Boyzone, celebrating the band's 20 years of existence. It included dates in England, Scotland, Singapore, Indonesia, Thailand and the Philippines. A huge contribution to the background and lead vocals came from backing vocalist Jo Garland, who has sung with Ronan Keating in his solo ventures since 2001 and with Boyzone since 2008. Her vocals have often taken the place of vocals that band member Stephen Gately sang before his death.

== Background ==
Keith Duffy said that the group were planning another trek, as well as an album, in recognition of their 20 years in the spotlight. "We've plans in place for a tour and an album next year for the 20th anniversary – that's if people want to come and see us, We've a very loyal fan base that always come in their thousands. It's a nice set-up. We never broke up, so we can take time out to do our own thing, and then get back together when it suits".

On 14 February, tickets were made available. It was announced that the tour had more demand than both One Direction and The Wanted.

In January 2014, it was announced that Boyzone would make their Forest Live debut that summer, in a continuation of the celebration of the BZ20 Tour.

== Support acts ==
- Jessica Clemmons for 2013 dates
- Kian Egan for 2014 dates

== 2013 setlist ==
1. "Nothing Without You"
2. "Picture of You"
3. "Ruby"
4. "Words"
5. "Everything I Own"
6. "Rise"
7. "When the Going Gets Tough"
8. "Gave It All Away"
9. "Better"
10. "One More Song"
11. "Baby Can I Hold You"
12. "You Needed Me"
13. "Light Up the Night"
14. "The Hour Before Christmas"
15. "Love Will Save the Day"
16. "If We Try"
17. "Love You Anyway"
18. "Too Late for Hallelujah"
19. "Right Here Waiting"
20. "Love Me for a Reason"
21. "No Matter What"
22. "Who We Are"

== 2014 setlist ==
1. "Nothing Without You"
2. "Picture of You"
3. "Ruby"
4. "Words"
5. "Everything I Own"
6. "Rise"
7. "When the Going Gets Tough"
8. "Gave It All Away"
9. "Better"
10. "You Needed Me"
11. "Baby Can I Hold You"
12. "Light Up the Night"
13. "Love Me for a Reason"
14. "No Matter What"
15. "Love Will Save the Day"
16. "If We Try"
17. "Love You Anyway"
18. "Who We Are"
19. "Right Here Waiting"
20. "Life Is a Rollercoaster"

== 2015 setlist ==
1. "Love is a Hurricane"
2. "Picture of You"
3. "Love You Anyway"
4. "Baby Can I Hold You"
5. "Everything I Own"
6. "Ruby"
7. "Words"
8. "You Needed Me"
9. "When the Going Gets Tough"
10. "Gave It All Away"
11. "Everyday I Love You"
12. "I Love The Way You Love Me"
13. "When You Say Nothing at All"
14. Medley: "Tracks of My Tears", "Reach Out I'll Be There", "You Can't Hurry Love"
15. "No Matter What"
16. "If We Try"
17. "Love Will Save the Day"
18. "Who We Are"
19. "A Different Beat"
20. "Love Me for a Reason"
21. "Life Is a Rollercoaster"

== 2017 summer shows setlist ==
1. "Picture of You"
2. "All That I Need"
3. "Ruby"
4. "Father and Son"
5. "Words"
6. "Isn't It a Wonder"
7. "Love Will Save the Day"
8. "Gave It All Away"
9. "When the Going Gets Tough"
10. "You Needed Me"
11. "Love You Anyway"
12. "Love Me for a Reason"
13. "Baby Can I Hold You"
14. "No Matter What"
15. "Who We Are"
16. "One More Song"
17. "A Different Beat"
18. "Life Is a Rollercoaster"

== DVD release ==
A DVD was filmed at The O2 Arena in London from the band's Brother Tour in 2011.

== BZ20 tour dates ==
Date	City	Country	Venue
Europe
28 November 2013	Dublin	Ireland	The O_{2}
29 November 2013	Belfast	Northern Ireland	Odyssey Arena
1 December 2013	Cardiff	Wales	Motorpoint Arena Cardiff
2 December 2013	Cardiff	Wales	Motorpoint Arena Cardiff
4 December 2013	Bournemouth	England	Bournemouth International Centre
5 December 2013	Bournemouth	England	Bournemouth International Centre
6 December 2013	Birmingham	England	LG Arena
8 December 2013	Liverpool	England	Echo Arena Liverpool
9 December 2013	Leeds	England	First Direct Arena
10 December 2013	Nottingham	England	Capital FM Arena Nottingham
11 December 2013	Blackpool	England	Blackpool Opera House
12 December 2013	Aberdeen	Scotland	AECC
14 December 2013	Newcastle	England	Metro Radio Arena
15 December 2013	Glasgow	Scotland	The SSE Hydro
17 December 2013	Brighton	England	Brighton Centre
18 December 2013	Brighton	England	Brighton Centre
20 December 2013	London	England	The O_{2} Arena
21 December 2013	London	England	Wembley Arena
22 December 2013	Manchester	England	Manchester Arena

== 2014, 2015, 2017 summer tour dates ==
Date	City	Country	Venue
Middle East
22 May 2014	Dubai	United Arab Emirates	Aviation Club Tennis Centre
Europe
7 June 2014	Durham	England	Riverside Ground
12 June 2014	Nottingham	England	Sherwood Forest
6 July 2014	Cheshire	England	Delamere Forest
11 July 2014	Suffolk	England	Thetford Forest
13 July 2014	London	England	Hyde Park (music festival with Tom Jones)
18 July 2014	Gloucestershire	England	Westonbirt Arboretum
20 July 2014	Northampton	England	Delapre Park
26 July 2014	Scarborough	England	Scarborough Open Air Theatre
30 July 2014	Surrey	England	Epsom Racecourse
2 August 2014	Belfast	Northern Ireland	Falls Park
Asia
22 May 2015	Jakarta	Indonesia	Istora Senayan
23 May 2015	Singapore		Marina Bay Sands
24 May 2015	Bangkok	Thailand	Impact Arena
26 May 2015	Quezon City	Philippines	Smart Araneta Coliseum
Europe
13 June 2015	Scarborough	England	Scarborough Open Air Theatre
20 June 2015	Nottingham	England	Riverside Park, Newark
27 June 2015	Telford	England	Town Park Arena
28 June 2015	Devon	England	Newton Abbot Racecourse
24 July 2015	Suffolk	England	Newmarket Racecourse
25 July 2015	Edinburgh	Scotland	Edinburgh Castle
29 July 2015	Surrey	England	Sandown Park Racecourse
1 August 2015	Southampton	England	Rose Bowl
25 August 2017	East Sussex	England	Hastings Pier
26 August 2017	Berkshire	England	Windsor Racecourse
2 September 2017	Essex	England	Chelmsford City Racecourse
16 September 2017	Derby	England	Derby County Cricket Ground
