= B-Sides & Rarities (Boyzone album) =

Compilation album by Boyzone
- Released: 13 October 2008
- Recorded: 1994–1999
- Genre: Pop
- Length: 34:05
- Label: Polydor
- Producer: Stephen Lipson

Boyzone chronology
| Back Again... No Matter What (2008) | B-Sides & Rarities (2008) | Brother (2010) |

B-Sides & Rarities is the fifth compilation album released by Irish boyband Boyzone. The album was released on the same day as their greatest hits compilation Back Again... No Matter What. The album contains a selection of b-sides, remixes and rare tracks recorded between 1994 and 1999. The album was exclusive to Woolworths stores across the UK.

== Track listing ==
1. "Key to My Life" (Unlocked Mix) - 3:46
2. "Words" (Alternate Mix) - 4:14
3. "A Different Beat" (Remix) - 6:45
4. "All That I Need" (Phil Da Costa's Oxygen Edit) - 3:24
5. "Mystical Experience" (Remix) - 4:14
6. "Coming Home Now" (Steve Jervier Mix) - 5:54
7. "Megamix" (Love to Infinity) - 8:33
8. "So Good" (Radio Edit) - 3:03
9. "Let the Message Run Free" - 5:13
10. "Boyzone Interview" (Hidden Track) - 8:00

== Charts ==
| Chart (2008) | Peak position |
|---|---|
| UK Albums (OCC) | 34 |
