= This Is Who We Are =

This Is Who We Are may refer to:

- This Is Who We Are (Run Kid Run album)
- This Is Who We Are (As I Lay Dying album)
- "This Is Who We Are", The Millennium Group slogan (1999 TV)
- "This Is Who We Are", a song by Hawthorne Heights from the album If Only You Were Lonely
- "This Is Who We Are", the slogan of American news network MSNBC
