= Back Again... No Matter What =

Compilation album by Boyzone
- Released: 13 October 2008
- Recorded: 1994–2008
- Genre: Pop
- Length: 1:11:23
- Label: Universal
- Producer: Steve Mac, Stephen Lipson, Ray Hedges, Jarrad Rogers, Andrew Lloyd Webber, Jim Steinman, Nigel Wright, Carl Sturken, Evan Rogers, Absolute, Gregg Alexander, Rick Nowels

Boyzone chronology
| Key to My Life: Collection (2006) | Back Again... No Matter What (2008) | B-Sides & Rarities (2008) |

Singles from Back Again... No Matter What
- 1. "Love You Anyway" Released: 29 September 2008; 2. "Better" Released: 8 December 2008

Professional ratings
Review scores
| Source | Rating |
|---|---|
| AllMusic | 2/5 stars |
| Digital Spy | 2/5 stars |
| Virgin Media | 1.5/5 stars |

Back Again... No Matter What is the fourth compilation album released by Irish boy band Boyzone. The album was released on 13 October 2008. It became the band's sixth top-ten album in the United Kingdom, charting at No. 4 and staying in the top 100 for 43 non-consecutive weeks; it also peaked at No. 3 in Ireland. Three new recordings were made for the album: "Love You Anyway", "Better" and "Can't Stop Thinking About You", the former two of which were both released as singles in promotion of the album. The three new songs were the first new material recorded by the band in nine years, and the last to be recorded before the death of Stephen Gately. The band's tour in the summer of 2008 was the tenth highest grossing set of concerts for that year.

== Track listing ==
| No. | Title | Writer(s) | Producer(s) | Length |
|---|---|---|---|---|
| 1. | "No Matter What" (from Where We Belong) | Andrew Lloyd Webber, Jim Steinman, Nigel Wright | Webber, Steinman, Wright | 4:32 |
| 2. | "Baby Can I Hold You" (from Where We Belong) | Tracy Chapman | Stephen Lipson | 3:15 |
| 3. | "Love You Anyway" (Previously unreleased) | Ronan Keating, Nick Atkinson | Jarrad Rogers | 3:21 |
| 4. | "Words" (from A Different Beat) | Barry Gibb, Robin Gibb, Maurice Gibb | Ray Hedges | 3:55 |
| 5. | "Love Me for a Reason" (from Said and Done) | David Jones, Johnny Bristol, Wade Brown | Ray Hedges | 3:39 |
| 6. | "A Different Beat" (from A Different Beat) | Keating, Hedges, Brannigan, Keith Duffy, Shane Lynch, Stephen Gately | Ray Hedges | 4:10 |
| 7. | "All That I Need" (from Where We Belong) | Evan Rogers, Carl Sturken | Rogers, Sturken | 3:42 |
| 8. | "Better" (Previously unreleased) | Tom Baxter, Sam Semple | Stephen Lipson | 3:36 |
| 9. | "You Needed Me" (from By Request) | Randy Goodrum | Stephen Lipson, Steve Mac | 3:28 |
| 10. | "Father and Son" (from Said and Done) | Cat Stevens | Ray Hedges | 2:56 |
| 11. | "Can't Stop Thinking About You" (Previously unreleased) | James Bourne, Steve Mac | Steve Mac | 3:32 |
| 12. | "I Love the Way You Love Me" (from Where We Belong) | Victoria Shaw, Chuck Cannon | Steve Mac | 4:06 |
| 13. | "Coming Home Now" (from Said and Done) | Keating, Keith Duffy, Mikey Graham, Shane Lynch, Stephen Gately | Ray Hedges | 3:47 |
| 14. | "Isn't It a Wonder" (from A Different Beat) | Keating, Ray Hedges, Martin Brannigan | Ray Hedges | 3:30 |
| 15. | "When the Going Gets Tough" (from By Request) | Wayne Anton Brathwaite, Barry James Eastmond, Mutt Lange, Billy Ocean | Steve Mac | 4:07 |
| 16. | "Picture of You" (from Where We Belong) | Ronan Keating, Nigel Kennedy, Paul Watkins, Paul Wilson | Absolute | 3:28 |
| 17. | "Everyday I Love You" (Non-album track) | Gary Baker, Frank Myers, Jerry Williams | Stephen Lipson | 4:04 |
| 18. | "Life Is a Rollercoaster (live)" (from Ronan) | Keating, Gregg Alexander, Rick Nowels | Gregg Alexander, Rick Nowels | 5:52 |

Australian bonus track
| No. | Title | Writer(s) | Producer(s) | Length |
|---|---|---|---|---|
| 19. | "When You Say Nothing at All" (from By Request) | Paul Overstreet, Don Schlitz | Stephen Lipson | 4:18 |

Deluxe edition bonus DVD
| No. | Title | Writer(s) | Producer(s) | Length |
|---|---|---|---|---|
| 1. | "No Matter What" | Andrew Lloyd Webber, Jim Steinman, Nigel Wright | Webber, Steinman, Wright | 4:32 |
| 2. | "Baby Can I Hold You" | Tracy Chapman | Stephen Lipson | 3:15 |
| 3. | "Words" | Barry Gibb, Robin Gibb, Maurice Gibb | Ray Hedges | 3:55 |
| 4. | "Love Me for a Reason" | David Jones, Johnny Bristol, Wade Brown | Ray Hedges | 3:39 |
| 5. | "A Different Beat" | Keating, Hedges, Brannigan, Keith Duffy, Shane Lynch, Stephen Gately | Ray Hedges | 4:10 |
| 6. | "All That I Need" | Evan Rogers, Carl Sturken | Rogers, Sturken | 3:42 |
| 7. | "You Needed Me" | Randy Goodrum | Stephen Lipson | 3:14 |
| 8. | "Father and Son" | Cat Stevens | Ray Hedges | 2:56 |
| 9. | "I Love the Way You Love Me" | Victoria Shaw, Chuck Cannon | Steve Mac | 4:06 |
| 10. | "Coming Home Now" | Keating, Keith Duffy, Mikey Graham, Shane Lynch, Stephen Gately | Ray Hedges | 3:47 |
| 11. | "Isn't It a Wonder" | Keating, Ray Hedges, Martin Brannigan | Ray Hedges | 3:30 |
| 12. | "When the Going Gets Tough" | Wayne Anton Brathwaite, Barry James Eastmond, Mutt Lange, Billy Ocean | Steve Mac | 4:07 |
| 13. | "Picture of You" | Ronan Keating, Nigel Kennedy, Paul Watkins, Paul Wilson | Absolute | 3:28 |
| 14. | "Everyday I Love You" | Gary Baker, Frank Myers, Jerry Williams | Stephen Lipson | 4:04 |
| 15. | "Key to My Life" | Keating, Hedges, Brannigan, Graham, Gately | Ray Hedges | 3:45 |
| 16. | "So Good" | Keating, Duffy, Graham, Lynch, Gately | Ray Hedges | 3:04 |

== Charts ==
=== Weekly charts ===
| Chart (2008) | Peak position |
|---|---|
| Australian Albums (ARIA) | 30 |
| Austrian Albums (Ö3 Austria) | 68 |
| European Albums Chart | 14 |
| German Albums (Offizielle Top 100) | 48 |
| Irish Albums (IRMA) | 3 |
| Norwegian Albums (VG-lista) | 35 |
| Scottish Albums (OCC) | 4 |
| South Korean Albums (Gaon Chart) | 87 |
| Swiss Albums (Hitparade) | 92 |
| Taiwanese Albums (G-Music) | 3 |
| UK Albums (OCC) | 4 |

=== Year-end charts ===
| Chart (2008) | Position |
|---|---|
| UK Albums (OCC) | 58 |
| Chart (2009) | Position |
| UK Albums (OCC) | 136 |
| Chart (2010) | Position |
| UK Albums (OCC) | 152 |

== Certifications and sales ==
| Region | Certification | Certified units/sales |
|---|---|---|
| United Kingdom (BPI) | 2× Platinum | 600,000^{‡} |
^{‡} Sales+streaming figures based on certification alone.
