= BZ20 =

Studio album by Boyzone
- Released: 22 November 2013
- Genre: Pop, pop rock
- Length: 37:26
- Label: Rhino
- Producer: Brian Rawling, Paul Meehan, Matt Furmidge, Lee McCutcheon

Boyzone chronology
Brother (2010)	BZ20 (2013)	Love Me for a Reason – The Collection (2014)

Singles from BZ20
- 1. "Love Will Save the Day" Released: 8 November 2013; 2. "Light Up the Night" Released: 10 February 2014; 3. "Who We Are" Released: 14 April 2014

BZ20 is the fifth studio album by Irish boy band Boyzone, released on 22 November 2013 by Rhino Records. It was mainly produced by Brian Rawling, Paul Meehan, and Matt Furmidge. As of October 2014, the album had sold 250,000 copies worldwide.

== Background ==
Boyzone's fifth album was originally going to be released in late 2010, but it was shelved due to Ronan Keating's commitments on The X Factor Australia. Due to the success of their previous album Brother (2010), Boyzone decided to celebrate 20 years since they began with a new studio album and tour. It was announced on 24 September 2013 that the brand new album would be released on 25 November 2013, and it became available to pre-order from Amazon. In September 2013, it was announced that Boyzone were recording their new studio album BZ20 at Metrophonic with Brian Rawling producing it. The band signed a new four-album recording deal with Warner Music to release BZ20 on 22 November 2013 through the Rhino label.

In a statement, Boyzone said: "We're incredibly proud to announce the release of our new studio album BZ20 and our new home at Warner Music. It seems crazy that 20 years have passed since we first got together but we are as excited now with the new album as we were back then. Bring on the next 20 years!"

It was also revealed that Boyzone will be making a programme discussing the album called Boyzone at 20, featuring clips of the band since their beginning in 1993 on ITV due for broadcast end of November 2013.

The artwork of the album was revealed on Twitter and Facebook and fans were encouraged to tweet a link and gradually the image started to be seen.

== Singles ==
"Love Will Save the Day" was released as the album's lead single on 8 November 2013. On 22 October 2013 the video for the song was released. The song was written by Jez Ashurst and Viktoria Hansen, and it was produced by Paul Meehan, Matt Furmidge, and Brian Rawling. It was first performed on the Australian The X Factor and given its first airplay in the United Kingdom on BBC Radio 2 in October 2013. "Love Will Save the Day" debuted at number 42 in Ireland, becoming the band's lowest-charting single to date. In the United Kingdom, the song debuted at number 39, becoming their second-lowest charting single.

"Light Up the Night" was released as the album's second single in February 2014.

"Who We Are" was issued as the album's third and final single on 14 April 2014, with the music video premiering one month prior on 16th March 2014.

== Promotion ==
The album is supported by the BZ20 Tour. On 9 November 2013, Boyzone performed the song on The Jonathan Ross Show. On 22 November they performed on The Paul O'Grady Show. Further TV appearances include Loose Women and Lorraine. Boyzone sang live on The Terry Wogan Show on BBC Radio 2 on 17 November two songs from the album - "Love Will Save the Day" and "Everything I Own". On 20 November 2013, Boyzone exclusively streamed their brand new album on Digital Spy. Boyzone performed the song 'Everything I Own' on BBC1 during Sport Relief and ITV Surprise Surprise during March 2014. The album has sold 250,000 copies worldwide including 200,000 copies in the UK and 10,000 copies in Germany.

== Reception ==
=== Critical reception ===
Professional ratings
Review scores
Source	Rating
Renowned for Sound	4/5 stars

David Callaghan of RenownedForSound said that "Boyzone are one form of music group that never seems to age and that they have a legacy not many other artists or groups combined could try and reach. Going on, he said that Ronan Keating, arguably their most notable member, starts us off with the cheesy yet powerful ballad Love Will Save the Day, and you can picture every girl, woman and grandmother have a tear in their eye and a melted heart in their hands. Everything I Own, Centre of Gravity and Heaven Is, continues the notion of soppy sweetness and screaming women from afar. Of course I can’t take anything away from Boyzone, this is what they’ve built their success on and for the most part it’s worked, so I congratulate each and every one of them. To take a look at the titles of all eleven tracks on the album, you know before you listen exactly what you’re going to get, if you didn’t know by now. BZ20 is a solid album, Boyzone do sound as good as ever. They don’t appear to of sold out and cashed in on a novelty album, like many other boy bands have done time and again. They stay consistent, sound very strong and coherent musically, and have produced and album that will keep everyone happy."

=== Commercial performance ===
In the United Kingdom, the album debuted at number six on the UK Albums Chart with first-week sales of 30,466 copies. As of December 2014, it has sold 199,854 copies in the UK.

== Track listing ==
- Boyzone announced the track listing on Twitter on 24 October 2013.

BZ20 – Standard version
No.	Title	Writer(s)	Producer(s)	Length
1.	"Love Will Save the Day" (lead vocals: Keating)	Jez Ashurst, Viktoria Hansen	Brian Rawling, Paul Meehan, Matt Furmidge	3:12
2.	"Who We Are" (lead vocals: Keating)	Andreas Moe, Andy Brown, Albin Nedler, Kristoffer Fogelmark	Rawling, Meehan, Furmidge	3:10
3.	"Everything I Own" (lead vocals: Graham, Keating)	David Ashworth Gates	Rawling, Meehan, Furmidge	3:13
4.	"Centre of Gravity" (lead vocals: Keating)	Daniel Neil McDougall, Ben Earle	Rawling, Meehan, Furmidge	3:40
5.	"Heaven Is" (lead vocals: Keating)	Don Mescall, Andy Hill, Fernando Pestana	Rawling, Meehan, Furmidge	3:30
6.	"If We Try" (lead vocals: Graham)	Michael Graham, Lee McCutcheon, Mark Read	McCutcheon	3:10
7.	"Nobody Knows" (lead vocals: Keating)	Joe Rich, Don DuBose	Rawling, Meehan, Furmidge	4:12
8.	"Best Night of Our Lives" (lead vocals: Keating)	Ronan Keating, Anthony Egizii, David Musumeci	Rawling, Meehan, Furmidge	3:02
9.	"Light Up the Night" (lead vocals: Keating)	Josh Kear, Ed Hill	Rawling, Meehan, Furmidge	3:14
10.	"Rise" (lead vocals: Keating)	Mescall, Danny Orton	Rawling, Meehan, Furmidge	3:12
11.	"The Hour Before Christmas" (lead vocals: Keating)	Mescall, Rob Wells	Rawling, Meehan, Furmidge	3:51

BZ20 – Deluxe version
No.	Title	Writer(s)	Producer(s)	Length
1.	"Love Will Save the Day" (lead vocals: Keating)	Jez Ashurst, Viktoria Hansen	Brian Rawling, Paul Meehan, Matt Furmidge	3:12
2.	"Who We Are" (lead vocals: Keating)	Andreas Moe, Andy Brown, Albin Nedler, Kristoffer Fogelmark	Rawling, Meehan, Furmidge	3:10
3.	"Everything I Own" (lead vocals: Graham, Keating)	David Ashworth Gates	Rawling, Meehan, Furmidge	3:13
4.	"Centre of Gravity" (lead vocals: Keating)	Daniel Neil McDougall, Ben Earle	Rawling, Meehan, Furmidge	3:40
5.	"Heaven Is" (lead vocals: Keating)	Don Mescall, Andy Hill, Fernando Pestana	Rawling, Meehan, Furmidge	3:30
6.	"If We Try" (lead vocals: Graham)	Michael Graham, Lee McCutcheon, Mark Read	McCutcheon	3:10
7.	"Nobody Knows" (lead vocals: Keating)	Joe Rich, Don DuBose	Rawling, Meehan, Furmidge	4:12
8.	"Best Night of Our Lives" (lead vocals: Keating)	Ronan Keating, Anthony Egizii, David Musumeci	Rawling, Meehan, Furmidge	3:02
9.	"Light Up the Night" (lead vocals: Keating)	Josh Kear, Ed Hill	Rawling, Meehan, Furmidge	3:14
10.	"You Will Be Mine" (lead vocals: Graham)	Ben Adams, Graham, Shelly McErlaine	Rawling, Meehan, Furmidge	3:25
11.	"Rise" (lead vocals: Keating)	Mescall, Danny Orton	Rawling, Meehan, Furmidge	3:13
12.	"Rust" (lead vocals: Keating, Lynch)	Patrick Mascall, Paul Barry, Keating	Rawling, Meehan, Furmidge	4:38
13.	"The Hour Before Christmas" (lead vocals: Keating)	Mescall, Rob Wells	Rawling, Meehan, Furmidge	3:49

== Credits and personnel ==
Credits adapted from AllMusic.

- Jez Ashurst – composer
- Steve Baccon – photography
- Dick Beetham – mastering
- Tony Buchen – vocal engineer
- Don DuBose – composer
- Ben Earle – composer
- Anthony Egizii – composer
- Kristoffer Fogelmark – composer
- Matt Furmidge – mixer, producer
- David Ashworth Gates – composer
- Viktoria Hansen – composer
- Ed Hill – composer
- Simon Johnson – guitar
- Josh Kear – composer
- Dom Liu – engineer
- Lee McCutcheon – composer, keyboards, producer
- Dan McDougall – composer
- Paul Meehan – keyboards, producer
- Don Mescall – composer
- Ryan Miller – vocal engineer
- Andreas Moe – composer
- David Musumeci – composer
- Albin Nedler – composer
- Danny Orton – composer
- Adam Phillips – guitar
- Brian Rawling – producer
- Mark Read – composer
- Joe Rich – composer
- Pat Roche – guitar
- Ric Salmon – A&R
- Dave Turner – mastering
- Rob Wells – composer
- Justine Young – A&R

== Charts ==
=== Weekly charts ===
Chart (2013–14)	Peak position
Australian Albums (ARIA)	85
Belgian Albums (Ultratop Flanders)	152
German Albums (Offizielle Top 100)	35
Irish Albums (IRMA)	7
Scottish Albums (OCC)	6
South Korean Albums (Gaon Chart)	36
Taiwanese Albums (G-Music)	10
UK Albums (OCC)	6

=== Year-end charts ===
Chart (2013)	Position
UK Albums (OCC)	55

== Certifications and sales ==
Region	Certification	Certified units/sales
United Kingdom (BPI)	Gold	200,000
