= Who We Are (Hope Partlow album) =

Studio album by Hope Partlow
- Released: September 6, 2005
- Recorded: 2004–2005
- Genre: Pop rock
- Label: Virgin

Who We Are is the only studio album by American pop music singer Hope Partlow. It was released on September 6, 2005. Shortly, after this album was released, Virgin Records dropped Partlow's contract.

== Track listing ==
1. "Who We Are" – 3:04
2. "Don't Go" – 3:29
3. "Crazy Summer Nights" – 3:38
4. "Sick Inside" – 3:16
5. "Girlfriend" – 3:07
6. "Like You Do" – 3:26
7. "I Believe in You" – 3:52
8. "It's Too Late" – 4:19
9. "Cold" – 3:15
10. "Through It All" – 3:47
11. "Everywhere But Here" – 2:51
12. "Let Me Try" – 5:41
13. "Who We Are (Saturday Night Mix)" – 3:15
14. "Slow Down" (Wal-Mart Exclusive Download)
