= Dublin to Detroit =

2014 concept album by Boyzone

Studio album by Boyzone
- Released: 21 November 2014
- Genre: Soul
- Length: 35:30
- Label: East West
- Producers: Brian Rawling, Paul Meehan

Boyzone chronology
Love Me for a Reason - The Collection (2014)	Dublin to Detroit (2014)	Thank You & Goodnight (2018)

Dublin to Detroit is the sixth studio album by Irish boy band Boyzone. It was released on 21 November 2014 by East West Records. It is the group's first concept album and features renditions of classic Motown hits. Dublin to Detroit became the group's lowest-charting studio album of their career, charting outside the top 10 of the charts in both Ireland and the United Kingdom. The album has been certified silver by the British Phonographic Industry (BPI) for shipments of 60,000 copies in the United Kingdom.

== Background ==
On 17 July 2014, it was announced that Boyzone would be releasing an album called From Dublin to Detroit, an album with covers of Motown hits. Keith Duffy said "We're basically just covering some of our favourite songs from the Motown era, and putting a full album together. So we've got 11 really exciting tracks coming out. It's going to give us a whole new catalogue of music to perform. And it will be very interesting how it fits in with our own back catalogue. It's kind of rejuvenating us. It's giving us just good times and good memories in the studio. So fingers crossed people will receive it well and it goes well for us."

On 29 September, a few songs from the album were announced on Twitter; "What Becomes of the Brokenhearted", "The Tracks of My Tears", "Just My Imagination" and "I'm Doin' Fine Now" (not actually a Motown song).

== Music videos ==
Boyzone have released videos for the songs "What Becomes of the Brokenhearted", "Reach Out I'll Be There" and "Wherever I Lay My Hat".

== Reception ==
=== Critical reception ===
Professional ratings
Review scores
Source	Rating
The Irish Times	2/5 stars
Renowned for Sound	2.5/5 stars
Scunthorpe Telegraph	2/5 stars
Entertainment Focus	2/5 stars

Lauren Murphy of The Irish Times wrote: "It's a no-brainer that Boyzone have decided to release a covers album in the run-up to Christmas; what is more puzzling is their decision to cover this collection of Motown classics in a style that is closer to karaoke than anything else. Ronan Keating occasionally makes way for Mikey Graham on lead vocals as they tackle the likes of Tracks of My Tears, I’m Doing Fine Now and You Can’t Hurry Love; but with a cheesy backing track providing the music, the vitality and soul of most of these songs are rendered flat and schmaltzy. Cynicism placed firmly aside, a live band and some creative arrangements might have made all the difference."

Jamie Parmenter of Renowned for Sound wrote: "Tracks of my Tears takes a sombre tone with great vocal emotion before breaking into the instantly recognisable chorus; Ronan's having fun here as lead singer and it really shows. I don’t think anyone could do a bad cover of Higher and Higher and the boys don’t disappoint here. Just My Imagination is one of the lesser-known tracks on the record, but this is exactly what makes it stand out as an album highlight. The band do a great job with warm and comforting vocals, perfectly suited for the slow nature of the song. What Becomes of the Broken Hearted has nice vocal harmonising, but the swapping of lead vocals drowns out the essence of the heartbreak, whereas You Can't Hurry Love was always going to be a distant third choice behind The Supremes and Phil Collins efforts. Tears for a Clown's main vocals seem a little drowned out amongst the many layers, and to finish off, the band decided to end with a Christmas song. This makes for an odd climax to the album. Overall Dublin to Detroit is an album of contrasts. On the one hand their vocals are usually strong and suit the music, but they haven't made much attempt to make the tracks their own. I’d say they still have more to give us, and as such I’d like to hear a new record of original material in the future to see if they’ve still got it."

Nick Cole of Scunthorpe Telegraph wrote: "It's 20 years since Ronan and the boys first charted in the UK with Love Me For A Reason. So to celebrate the band hit the rocky road to Detroit with 11 covers of such classics as Higher and Higher, Tracks of My Tears and This Old Heart of Mine. To their credit this salute to the magic of Motown works very well."

Entertainment Focus highlighted the lack of support for Ronan Keating in the songs and "all is going well until someone other than Ronan Keating starts to sing". It commented that What Christmas Means To Me is another moment they enjoyed and made them think maybe the group should have done a Christmas record instead. "The more stripped-back This Old Heart of Mine really exposes the limits to the vocal abilities of the group. Ronan, as is to be expected, sounds fine but when he hands vocals to another member it all kind of just falls flat. The same is true on other songs such as Higher and Higher, and Wherever I Lay My Hat."

=== Commercial performance ===
Dublin to Detroit debuted at number 12 on the Irish Albums Chart. In the United Kingdom, the album debuted at number 14 on the UK Albums Chart with first-week sales of 19,451 copies. It is the group's first studio album to not chart in the top 10 of both territories.

== Promotion ==
Boyzone performed a medley of songs from the album on The X Factor Australia live results show on 13 October 2014. On 14 November, the band promotes the album in the UK on BBC One for Children in Need. On 22 November 2014, they performed on The Jonathan Ross Show.

== Track listing ==
No.	Title	Writer(s)	Original artist(s)	Length
1.	"What Becomes of the Brokenhearted" (lead vocals: Keating, Graham)	William Weatherspoon, Paul Riser, James Dean	Jimmy Ruffin (1966)	3:15
2.	"The Tracks of My Tears" (lead vocals: Keating)	William Robinson, Warren Moore, Marvin Tarplin	The Miracles (1965)	3:06
3.	"You Can't Hurry Love" (lead vocals: Keating, Graham)	Holland–Dozier–Holland	The Supremes (1966)	2:52
4.	"This Old Heart of Mine" (lead vocals: Keating, Graham)	Holland–Dozier–Holland, Sylvia Moy	The Isley Brothers (1966)	3:58
5.	"Just My Imagination" (lead vocals: Keating)	Norman Whitfield, Barrett Strong	The Temptations (1971)	3:33
6.	"Higher and Higher" (lead vocals: Keating, Graham)	Gary Jackson, Carl Smith	Jackie Wilson (1967)	3:00
7.	"I'm Doin' Fine Now" (lead vocals: Keating)	Thom Bell, Sherman Marshall	New York City (1973)	3:13
8.	"Reach Out I'll Be There" (lead vocals: Keating, Graham)	Holland–Dozier–Holland	Four Tops (1966)	3:13
9.	"The Tears of a Clown" (lead vocals: Keating)	Stevie Wonder, Hank Cosby, Smokey Robinson	Smokey Robinson & The Miracles (1967)	3:05
10.	"Wherever I Lay My Hat" (lead vocals: Keating, Graham)	Marvin Gaye, Barrett Strong, Norman Whitfield	Marvin Gaye (1962)	3:37
11.	"What Christmas Means to Me" (lead vocals: Keating)	Anna Gordy Gaye, Allen Story, George Gordy	Stevie Wonder (1967)	2:38

== Personnel ==
- Boyzone – vocals
- Brian Rawling and Paul Meehan – producer
- Dom Liu – assistant engineer
- Adam Phillips – guitar and bass
- Nick Squires – string arrangement and cello
- Ben Hancox and Rustom Pomeroy – violins
- Andy Ross – sax and woodwind
- Ralph Lamb – trumpet
- Nichol Thompson – trombone
- Dick Beetham – mastering
- Matt Furmidge – mixing
- Jon Gilbert – design
- Ray Burmiston – photography
- Shelina Somani-Lewis – styling
- Sarah Brimson – grooming
- Mark Plunkett and Jaqui Heywood – management

== Charts ==
=== Weekly charts ===
Chart (2014)	Peak position
Australian Albums (ARIA)	43
Irish Albums (IRMA)	12
Scottish Albums (Official Charts)	13
UK Albums (Official Charts)	14

=== Year-end charts ===
Chart (2014)	Position
UK Albums (OCC)	96

== Certifications and sales ==
Region	Certification	Certified units/sales
United Kingdom (BPI)	Silver	60,000^{*}
^{*} Sales figures based on certification alone.

== Release history ==
Country	Date	Format	Label
Australia	21 November 2014	Digital download	East West Records
Austria	21 November 2014	Digital download	East West Records
Belgium	21 November 2014	Digital download	East West Records
Germany	21 November 2014	CD, digital download	East West Records
Ireland	21 November 2014	Digital download	East West Records
Netherlands	21 November 2014	Digital download	East West Records
New Zealand	21 November 2014	Digital download	East West Records
Norway	21 November 2014	Digital download	East West Records
Switzerland	21 November 2014	Digital download	East West Records
Denmark	24 November 2014	Digital download	East West Records
United Kingdom	24 November 2014	CD, digital download	East West Records
