= Michael Graham (singer) =

Irish singer, actor

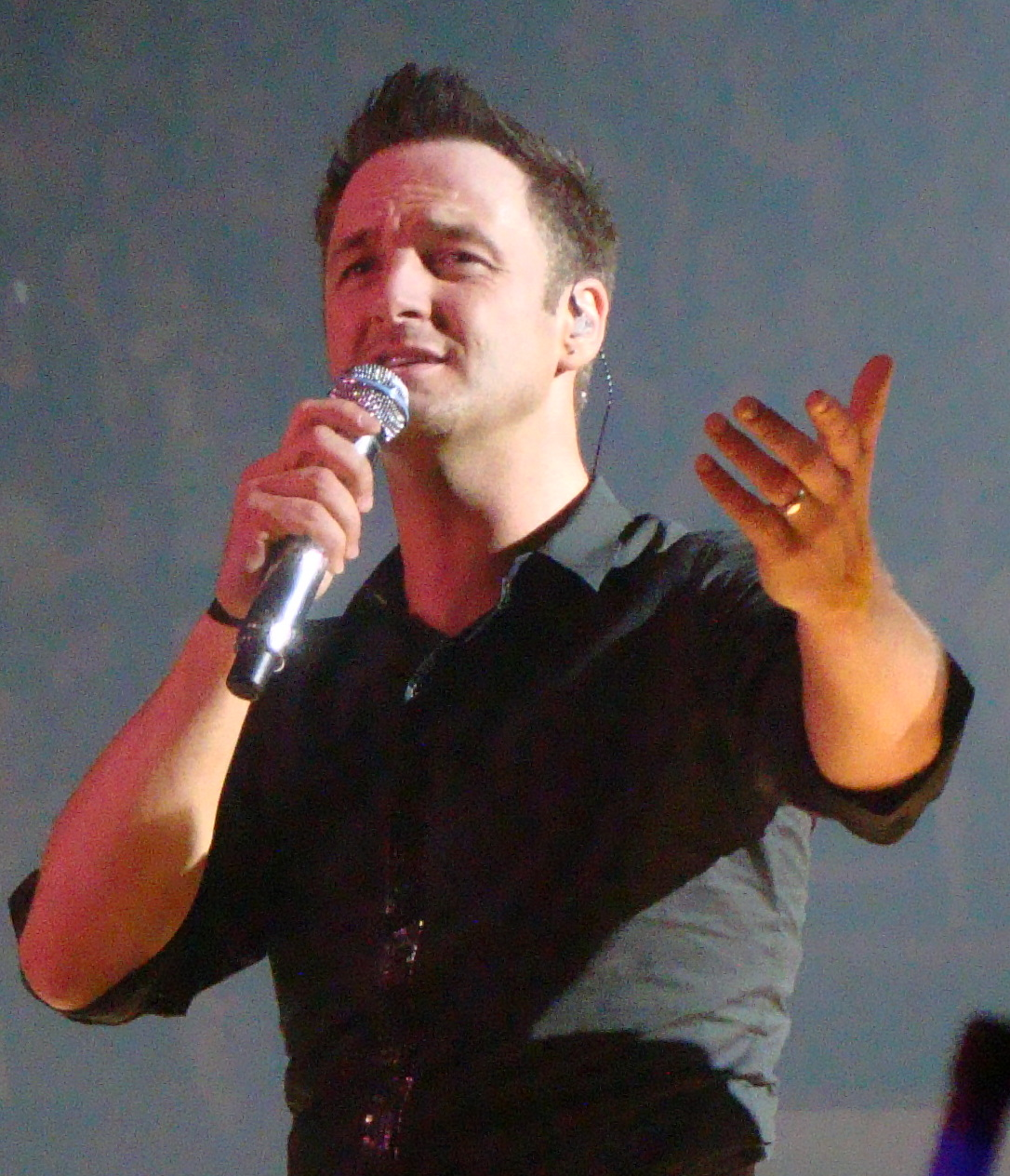
- Graham performing with Boyzone, 2009
- Born: Michael Christopher Charles Graham; 15 August 1972 (age 54); Raheny, Dublin, Ireland
- Occupations: Musician, singer-songwriter, actor, music producer
- Spouse: Karen Corradi (m. 2004; div. 2024)
- Children: 2
- Musical career
- Genres: Pop, rock
- Years active: 1993–2019, 2026
- Label: Polydor UK
- Formerly of: Boyzone

Michael Christopher Charles Graham (born 15 August 1972) is an Irish singer-songwriter, actor and record producer. He debuted in 1993 alongside Keith Duffy, Ronan Keating, Shane Lynch, and Stephen Gately as part of Irish pop group Boyzone.

== Early life ==
The youngest of seven children, Graham was born to housewife Sheila and carpenter William. He was raised on the Northside of Dublin with five older sisters and one older brother. He attended Billie Barry Stage School in Dublin and started his life in the public eye at an early age, appearing in television adverts for Mikado biscuits, the Electricity Supply Board (the ESB) and T-Mobile. Like his bandmate Shane Lynch, Graham had worked as a mechanic before finding fame as a singer; Lynch has stated in an interview that during the early days of Boyzone, he and Graham had a heated argument over exhaust pipes and barely spoke to each other for fifteen years.

== Career ==
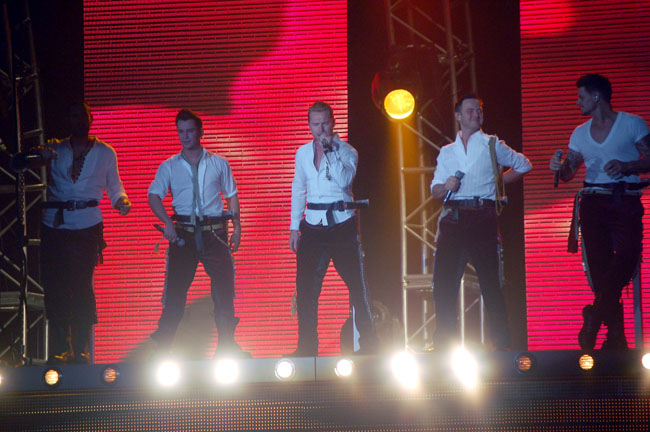
Boyzone performing on tour in 2009.

In 1993, Graham – who had previously been a member of the band Ivory – auditioned for a new boy band which would later be known as Boyzone, singing Meat Loaf's "Two Out of Three Ain't Bad". Although he was not chosen as part of the final line-up, manager Louis Walsh changed his mind after firing two members for their lack of commitment.

Graham gained a reputation as 'the quiet one' in the band, but despite their success he felt Boyzone's pop-styles did not give him a chance to expand his own musical horizons which included rock and folk. In an interview, he stated "Creatively and musically, what I wanted to do personally wasn't what was required for the band's product, so that suppression of what I wanted led to low self-esteem." Following Boyzone's split in 2000, he sank into depression, but gradually recovered. During his break from Boyzone, he trained as an actor in America, and studied Music Technology and Sound Production after his solo career as a singer ended.

In 1998, Graham broke into acting when he played Mikey Oprano the leader of a drugs gang in the full length Irish martial arts film Fatal Deviation, a low-budget cult film produced and set in Trim, County Meath. Comedy website Cracked.com nominated Fatal Deviation as the worst movie ever made saying; "you could replace film school with this movie alone–just screening it once for students and asking them to list all the things it did wrong. Anyone who doesn't write "everything" instantly fails".

In 2007, the reunited Boyzone completed a 29-date reunion tour and released their comeback single on 29 September 2008, Love You Anyway, which was followed by a Greatest Hits album entitled Back Again... No Matter What released on 13 October 2008. He toured again with the band in 2009, and a brand new studio album with two singles - "Gave It All Away" and "Love Is a Hurricane" - were released the following year. In 2011, Graham joined his bandmates on tour, and again in 2013 with a new album.

Graham appeared in the 2008 low budget Irish feature film Situations Vacant written by Steve Murray and directed by Lisa Mulcahy who is best known for directing Irish Television drama The Clinic, and was also among the ten Irish actors who appeared on the RTÉ reality show Hollywood Trials

On the BBC television programme Something for the Weekend, Graham's bandmate Ronan Keating let slip that Graham would be taking part in the fifth series of Dancing on Ice, starting in January 2010. On the show he was paired with professional skater Melanie Lambert, but were voted off on 7 March in a skate-off with Danniella Westbrook and her partner Matt Gonzalez. On participating, Graham has described his training as therapy which has helped him come to terms with the death of his bandmate Stephen Gately, who had participated in the show two years earlier.

In February 2010 it was announced that Graham would be participating in Eurosong 2010, Ireland's final to select their Eurovision Song Contest entry. He performed the self-penned song "Baby, Nothing's Wrong" on 4 March on RTÉ One, attempting to achieve an eighth victory for Ireland in the competition, but placed second, losing out to Eurovision 1993 winner Niamh Kavanagh.

In 2013 he appeared in Celebrity Apprentice Ireland on TV3.

Graham retired from the public eye following Boyzone's split in 2019. Graham appeared in the 2025 documentary Boyzone: No Matter What discussing why he had retired from public life and revealed he had not spoken to his former bandmates in five years. He decided not to join the rest of his bandmates in promoting the series.

Following the success of the documentary, it was announced that Graham would rejoin Boyzone for two farewell concerts at the Emirates Stadium, that took place in June 2026.

== Discography ==
=== Albums ===
| Title | Details |
|---|---|
| Meet Me Halfway | Debut studio album; Released: 16 April 2001; Formats: CD |

=== Singles ===
| Year | Title | Peak chart positions | | Album |
| Year | Title | UK | IRE | Album |
|---|---|---|---|---|
| 2000 | "You're My Angel" | 13 | 15 | Meet Me Halfway |
| 2000 | "If You'd Only... (Make Up Your Mind)" | — | 29 | Meet Me Halfway |
| 2001 | "You Could Be My Everything" | 62 | — | Meet Me Halfway |

== Filmography ==
=== Film ===
| Year | Title | Role | Notes |
|---|---|---|---|
| 1998 | Fatal Deviation | Mikey | |
| 2003 | Hey Mr DJ | Paddy Moore | |
| 2008 | Situations Vacant | John | |

=== Television ===
| Year | Title | Role | Notes |
|---|---|---|---|
| 1998 | Boyzone: Live In Your Living Room | Himself | 1 episode |
| 2008 | The Boyz Are Back In Town | Himself | 1 episode |
| 2010 | Dancing on Ice | Contestant | 20 episodes |
| 2013 | Boyzone at 20: No Matter What | Himself | ITV special |
| 2025 | Boyzone: No Matter What | Himself | 3 episodes |
| 2026 | Boyzone: One For The Road | Himself | 1 episode |
