= Better (Tom Baxter song) =

2007 single by Tom Baxter

Single by Tom Baxter

from the album Skybound
- Released: 3 December 2007
- Recorded: 2007
- Genre: Acoustic rock, pop
- Length: 3:43
- Label: Charisma
- Songwriter: Tom Baxter/Sam Semple

Tom Baxter singles chronology
"This Boy" (2004)	"Better" (2007)

"Better" is a 2007 single by British singer-songwriter, Tom Baxter, co-written with Sam Semple. It was released on 3 December 2007, reaching a peak of No. 10 in the Irish Singles Chart and No. 67 in the UK Singles Chart in 2008.

== Track listing ==
1. "Better"
2. "Too Far Gone"
3. Love Is Not Enough

== Chart positions ==
Chart (2008)	Peak position
Irish Singles Chart	10
UK Singles Chart	67

== Boyzone cover ==
"Better"

Single by Boyzone

from the album Back Again... No Matter What
- B-side: "Coming Home Now"
- Released: 8 December 2008
- Recorded: 2008
- Genre: Pop
- Length: 3:36
- Label: Polydor
- Songwriters: Tom Baxter, Sam Semple
- Producer: Stephen Lipson

Boyzone singles chronology
"Love You Anyway" (2008)	"Better" (2008)	"Gave It All Away" (2010)

Music video
- "Better" on YouTube

The first version of the song to chart was a cover by Boyzone, released in December 2008 as the second and final single from their second greatest hits compilation, Back Again... No Matter What. It became their final single released before the death of band member Stephen Gately in 2009.

=== Background ===
Boyzone's version of the song features both Ronan Keating and Stephen Gately on lead vocals. The single received less promotion than Love You Anyway, due to the band's tour commitments, and charted much lower, selling 30,000 copies and becoming Boyzone's first single to miss the top 3 in Ireland and the first to miss the top 5 in the UK.

=== Music video ===
The music video for "Better" premiered on 14 October 2008. The entire video was shot in black and white, with each member of the group singing to a woman he is holding – with the exception of Stephen Gately, who is shown singing to a man – the only time a Boyzone video has depicted a same-sex love interest. The video marks the last appearance for Gately in a Boyzone video, due to his death in October 2009.

=== Track listing ===
- Digital download
1. "Better" – 3:36
2. "Coming Home Now" – 3:46

=== Chart positions ===
Chart (2008)	Peak position
Europe (Eurochart Hot 100)	63
Ireland (IRMA)	26
Scotland (OCC)	21
UK Singles (OCC)	22
UK Airplay (Music Week)	21
