= Gave It All Away =

2010 single by Boyzone

Single by Boyzone featuring Stephen Gately

from the album Brother
- B-side: "I Love the Way You Love Me" (live)
- Released: 1 March 2010
- Recorded: 2007–2009
- Length: 4:30
- Label: Polydor
- Songwriter: Mika
- Producer: Greg Wells

Boyzone singles chronology
"Better" (2008)	"Gave It All Away" (2010)	"Love Is a Hurricane" (2010)

Music video
- "Gave It All Away" on YouTube

"Gave It All Away" is a song performed by Irish boy band Boyzone, released as the lead single from their fourth studio album, Brother, on 1 March 2010. It was their first single released following the death of member Stephen Gately, whose vocals appear in the song.

== Background ==
The song was written for the band by British singer-songwriter Mika, and was originally intended as the group's comeback single in September 2008, but Mika decided against its release for unknown reasons. As such, the song features lead vocals from Ronan Keating and Stephen Gately. After Gately's death in October 2009, Mika contacted the band and asked if they wished to release the song as a tribute to Gately. He said: "I was shocked and saddened when to hear about Stephen's passing. He touched so many people's lives both with his music and with his wonderful personality. It's an honour to hear him sing my song. I wish all the best to the rest of the boys. I'm proud of the song and proud of their version". The song received its first airplay on 17 January 2010 on Keating's radio show on Magic Radio.

== Music video ==
The music video for "Gave It All Away" premiered a week after its release, on 8 March 2010, at a total length of three minutes and forty seven seconds. The video is a tribute to the late Stephen Gately, and features footage from his time in the band and previously unseen footage from his personal life. The video revolves around the four remaining band members reminiscing about Stephen and mourning his passing. The video has received over three million views on YouTube.

== Chart performance ==
"Gave It All Away" reached No. 1 on the Irish Singles Chart, knocking Jedward's "Under Pressure (Ice Ice Baby)" from the top spot. On 7 March 2010, "Gave It All Away" debuted on the UK Singles Chart at No. 9, marking Boyzone's eighteenth UK Top 10 hit. The single spent only one week in the Top 10, as it fell to No. 20 the following week. On its third week in the chart, the single fell a further nine places to No. 29. However, following a performance from the band on Boyzone: A Tribute to Stephen Gately, broadcast on ITV1 to an audience of 8.12 million, the track entered the top 10 once again at No. 10. In the UK, first week sales were at 60,000, overall it has sold over 200,000 copies in the UK. On Sunday 10 October, Boyzone sang the song live on Australian X Factor. The following week, it debuted on the Australian ARIA chart at No. 42.

== Track listing ==
- Digital download
1. "Gave It All Away" - 4:30
2. "Gave It All Away" (Music Video) - 3:47
- CD single
1. "Gave It All Away" – 4:30
2. "I Love The Way You Love Me" (Live on The Reunion Tour) – 4:01

== Charts ==
=== Weekly charts ===
Chart (2010)	Peak position
Australia (ARIA)	42
Europe (Eurochart Hot 100)	28
Ireland (IRMA)	1
New Zealand (Recorded Music NZ)	21
Scotland Singles (OCC)	6
UK Singles (OCC)	9

=== Year-end charts ===
Chart (2010)	Position
UK Singles (OCC)	159

== Certifications ==
Region	Certification	Certified units/sales
United Kingdom (BPI)	Silver	200,000^{‡}
^{‡} Sales+streaming figures based on certification alone.

== Release history ==
Region	Date	Format
Ireland	1 March 2010	CD single, digital download
United Kingdom	1 March 2010	CD single, digital download
