= Love You Anyway (Boyzone song) =

Single by Boyzone

from the album Back Again... No Matter What
- B-side: "When the Going Gets Tough"
- Released: 29 September 2008
- Recorded: Melbourne, Australia (Sing Sing Studios); London, England (My Place Studio's and Olympic Studios) 2004
- Genre: Pop
- Length: 3:21
- Label: Polydor
- Songwriters: Jarrad Rogers, Nick Atkinson, Ronan Keating
- Producer: Jarrad Rogers

Boyzone singles chronology
"Every Day I Love You" (1999)	"Love You Anyway" (2008)	"Better" (2008)

Music video
- "Love You Anyway" on YouTube

"Love You Anyway", or "I Love You Anyway", is a song by Irish boy band Boyzone, released as the lead single from their second compilation album, Back Again... No Matter What. It was their first single in over eight years, and their last hit single to be co-written by any members of the group.

== Background ==
The song features an elaborate, Phil Spector-sounding production, with a 'busy' instrumentation including choir-like backing vocals, jangly guitars, trombones, tambourines and tubular bells.

== Music video ==
The video for "Love You Anyway" starts with Ronan Keating strolling past a taxi while wearing sunglasses and a suit. Stephen Gately then walks down the same road following two ladies dressed in black. Three more ladies come into view and start dancing behind Ronan and others dance further down the street. Shane Lynch looks out of his car to see two ladies wearing coats leaning against the bonnet - he gets out to admire them before walking past. More girls dance on some steps next to Mikey Graham after he wore sunglasses while strolling. Keith Duffy gets out of a taxi to look at girls in front of it. The band members then perform a dance routine in the middle of the road, accompanied by the ladies, before embracing each other. The band continue this routine for the rest of the video, before changing into slightly more casual clothes. The band finish the video with arms around each other's shoulders.

== Promotion and sales performance ==
The band did not preview the song on their reunion tour, and instead promoted the album track "Can't Stop Thinking About You", which was originally intended for release as a single. The band, however, made numerous public, television and radio appearances to promote the single. The band performed as a part of the annual Blackpool Illuminations in August 2008. On 7 September 2008 they appeared as guest hosts on The Sunday Night Project with Justin Lee Collins and Alan Carr. They performed the song on the ITV entertainment show For One Night Only on 14 September 2008, live from the Fountain Studios in Wembley. On 25 September they appeared on This Morning on GMTV and performed the song in front of Phillip Schofield and Fern Britton. The music video was first aired on The Box music channel on 3 September. The song received its first radio play on Terry Wogan's Radio 2 show on 20 August.

The song reached No. 5 on the UK Charts and No. 3 on the Irish Charts as well as medium success in Europe. In the UK, the song sold 88,000 copies during its nine weeks in the charts and worldwide the figure is at 120,000.

== Track listing ==
- UK CD single / Digital single
1. "Love You Anyway" - 3:20
2. "Isn't It a Wonder" (Live on The Reunion Tour) - 3:37
- German CD single / Digital EP
1. "Love You Anyway" - 3:20
2. "Isn't It a Wonder" (Live on The Reunion Tour) - 3:37
3. "When The Going Gets Tough" - 3:36
4. "No Matter What" (Live on The Reunion Tour) - 4:43
5. "Love You Anyway" (Music Video)

== Chart positions ==
On 5 October 2008, the song peaked at No. 5 on the UK Singles Chart, becoming the group's 17th consecutive top 5 hit in the UK. It also charted at No. 6 in the Irish Singles Chart in its first week and rose to No. 3 the next week.

Chart (2008)	Peak position
Australia (ARIA)	111
Europe (Eurochart Hot 100)	20
Germany (GfK)	30
Hungary (Rádiós Top 40)	12
Ireland (IRMA)	3
Norway (VG-lista)	20
Scotland (OCC)	2
Switzerland Airplay (Swiss Hitparade)	43
UK Singles (OCC)	5
UK Airplay (Music Week)	9
UK Downloads (OCC)	8

End of year chart (2008)	Position
Taiwan (Hito Radio)	13
UK Singles (OCC)	130
