= Love Is a Hurricane =

Single by Boyzone

from the album Brother
- Released: 17 May 2010
- Recorded: 2009
- Genre: Pop
- Length: 3:30
- Label: Polydor
- Songwriters: Danielle Brisebois, Gregg Alexander
- Producer: Greg Wells

Boyzone singles chronology
"Gave It All Away" (2010)	"Love Is a Hurricane" (2010)	"Love Will Save the Day" (2013)

Music video
- "Love Is a Hurricane" on YouTube

"Love is a Hurricane" is a song performed by Irish boyband Boyzone, released as the second single from their fourth studio album, Brother, on 17 May 2010.

== Background and sales performance ==
"Love is a Hurricane" marks the band's first single to not feature vocals from band member Stephen Gately, who died in October 2009. After debuting the track on their ITV show Boyzone: A Tribute to Stephen Gately, the reaction from fans made the choice of the second single an easy decision. An upbeat, feel good, infectious pop anthem; Love Is a Hurricane was written by New Radicals frontman Gregg Alexander, who has previously written for Ronan's solo albums as well as other solo artists. The band also performed the song on GMTV, This Morning and Loose Women. The song originally charted at number 84 before it was decided to be a single and its peak position was No. 44 charting for four weeks in the UK charts selling 14,000 copies and it charted at number 39 in Ireland.

== Music video ==
The music video for "Love is a Hurricane" premiered on 4 May 2010. The video features the four band members stripping nude inside Battersea power station, before jumping into baths of various food items. Band member Shane Lynch revealed that he suggested the band get naked for their new music video, admitting that "the nude clip for our new single was intended to reflect the new direction we had taken on Brother". An edited version of the video was released for TV airplay on 8 May 2010.

== Track listings ==
- CD single
1. "Love Is a Hurricane" (Single Version) - 3:19
2. "Love Is a Hurricane" (7th Heaven Radio Edit) - 3:51
- Digital download
1. "Love Is a Hurricane" (Single Version) - 3:19
2. "Love Is a Hurricane" (7th Heaven Radio Edit) - 3:51
3. "Love Is a Hurricane" (7th Heaven Club Mix) - 6:41
4. "Love Is a Hurricane" (Music Video) - 3:24

== Chart performance ==
Chart (2010)	Peak Position
Ireland (IRMA)	39
Scotland (OCC)	32
UK Singles (OCC)	44
UK Airplay (Music Week)	10
