= Boyzone =

Irish boy band

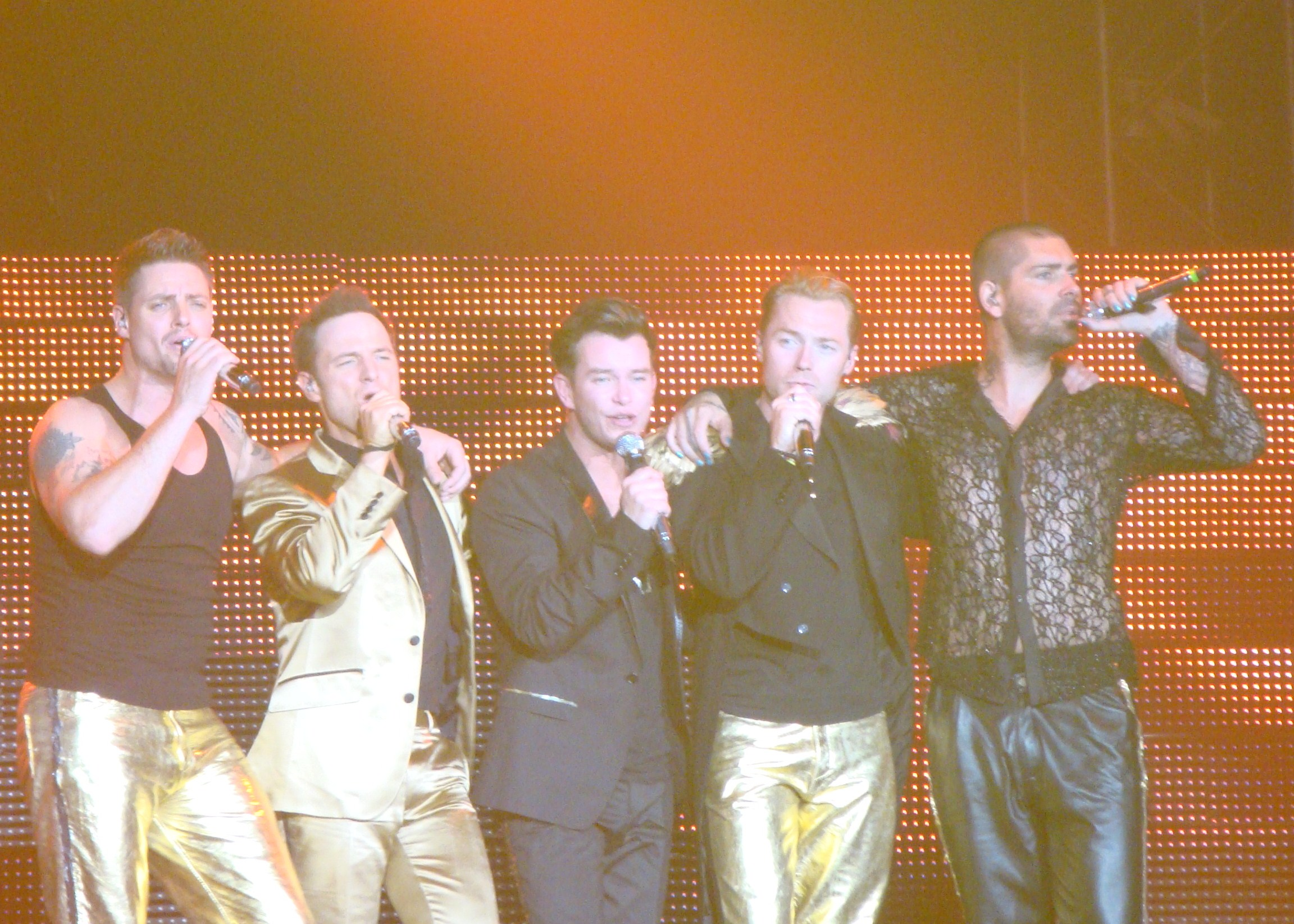
- Boyzone during a performance in June 2009

Background information
- Origin: Dublin, Ireland
- Genre: Pop
- Years active: 1993–2000; 2007–2019; 2026
- Labels: Polydor; Warner
- Past members: Michael Graham; Keith Duffy; Stephen Gately; Shane Lynch; Ronan Keating
- Website: boyzonenetwork.com

Boyzone logo

Boyzone are an Irish boy band created in 1993 by the talent manager Louis Walsh. Before even recording any material, Boyzone made an appearance on RTÉ's The Late Late Show. Its most successful line-up was composed of Keith Duffy, Stephen Gately, Mikey Graham, Ronan Keating, and Shane Lynch. As of 2018, Boyzone had released seven studio albums and nine compilation albums.

In 2012, the Official Charts Company revealed the biggest selling singles artists in British music chart history, with Boyzone currently placed at 29th and the second most successful boy band in Britain, behind Take That. According to the British Phonographic Industry (BPI), Boyzone has been certified for sales of 6.4 million albums and 8.6 million singles in the UK, with 25 million records sold by 2013 worldwide. Boyzone have had six UK No.1 singles and nine No.1 singles in Ireland. Of the 24 singles they released in the UK, 21 entered the top 40 (including 18 in the top 10 and 12 in the top 2) in the UK charts and 22 singles (including 19 in the top 5) in the Irish charts. They have had five No. 1 albums in the UK.

Boyzone split in 1999, but made a comeback in 2007, originally with the intention of just touring. Gately died on 10 October 2009 of a congenital heart defect while on holiday in the Spanish island of Mallorca. Boyzone went on tour in late 2018 to celebrate their 25th anniversary. An album to celebrate the anniversary was released on 16 November 2018. On 28 April 2018, it was announced that the band would split after their anniversary celebrations, which ended in 2019.

Following the success of their TV documentary in 2025, Boyzone have reformed for a one-off farewell stadium show in 2026.

== History ==
=== Breakthrough and Said and Done (1993–1995) ===
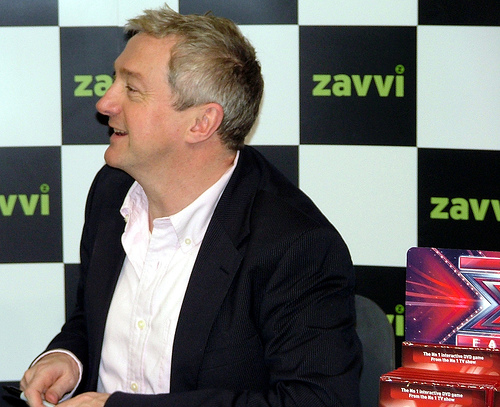
Music manager Louis Walsh wished to create an "Irish version of Take That"

In 1993, an advertisement appeared in Irish newspapers calling for auditions to form a new Irish "boy band" group. The advertisements were sent out by theatrical manager Louis Walsh who was looking to make an "Irish Take That" following on from that band's success. The auditions were held in The Ormond Centre, in Dublin, in November 1993. More than 300 people replied to the advertisement. At the auditions the applicants were asked to sing the song "Careless Whisper" by George Michael. Each audition would be taped and watched again to judge the applicant's performance. Out of the 300, 50 were selected for a second audition. For the second audition the applicants where asked to sing two songs, including one of their own choice with a backing tape. Mikey Graham sang "Two Out of Three Ain't Bad" by Meat Loaf, Keith Duffy sang "I'm Too Sexy" by Right Said Fred, Ronan Keating sang "Father and Son" by Cat Stevens (a cover version of which the band would later release), and Stephen Gately sang "Hello" by Lionel Richie. Out of this 50, 10 were selected for a third audition. In the end, Keating, Gately, Duffy, Richard Rock (son of Dickie Rock), Shane Lynch and Mark Walton were chosen. This lineup of the group were mocked by both the audience and presenter Gay Byrne in an appearance on The Late Late Show in 1993, where they mimed and danced to the Clubhouse hit "Light My Fire". Graham originally was rejected but later joined after Rock's departure.

Boyzone played through 1994 in pubs and clubs all over Northern Ireland before PolyGram signed them up in 1994 and released the cover version of the Four Seasons' hit "Working My Way Back to You", featuring Graham and Gately on lead vocals. It reached No. 3 in the Irish Charts. The release of their cover version of the classic Johnny Bristol song, "Love Me for a Reason", broke into the British charts. The song hit No. 2 in the UK and was included in their 1995 hit debut album, Said and Done. The album reached the No. 1 spot in Ireland and the UK. In 1995, the singles "Key to My Life", "So Good" and "Father and Son" were released, which all got the attention of new fans in Europe.

=== A Different Beat and Where We Belong (1996–1998) ===
Their second album, A Different Beat, was released in 1996. This album brought the band worldwide success, and sold 2 million copies worldwide. The song "Coming Home Now" was released as a single. Boyzone had their first UK No. 1 single, a cover of the Bee Gees' hit "Words". The album also contained the hit singles "A Different Beat" and "Isn't It a Wonder". In 1997, Boyzone released three singles: "Isn't It a Wonder", "Picture of You", and "Baby Can I Hold You/Shooting Star". The group performed "Let The Message Run Free" at the Eurovision Song Contest 1997, co-hosted by Keating, in Dublin and tried to break the US market with their version of "Mystical Experience", which they also recorded in Spanish. Ronan Keating – who by now had emerged as the lead singer and frontman – won the Ivor Novello Award for songwriting in 1997 for "Picture of You".

Their third studio album, Where We Belong, was released in 1998 and featured Boyzone's writing abilities; the album sold over 3 million copies worldwide. It contained the hit singles "All That I Need" (which stayed for six weeks in the MTV Asia charts), "Baby Can I Hold You" (Tracy Chapman cover) and "No Matter What".

Originally written for the Andrew Lloyd Webber stage musical Whistle Down the Wind, "No Matter What" was the group's best ever selling single selling over 4 million copies worldwide and it is the biggest selling record for a boy band, it was also voted Song of the Year, 1998. Since the song was also recorded by Meat Loaf, Boyzone shared the stage with him to perform the song during his 1998 live concert in Dublin. They also sang the song in Italy with Luciano Pavarotti. Their 1998 tour of Ireland broke all sales records when 35,000 tickets were sold out in four hours.

=== By Request and hiatus (1999–2007) ===
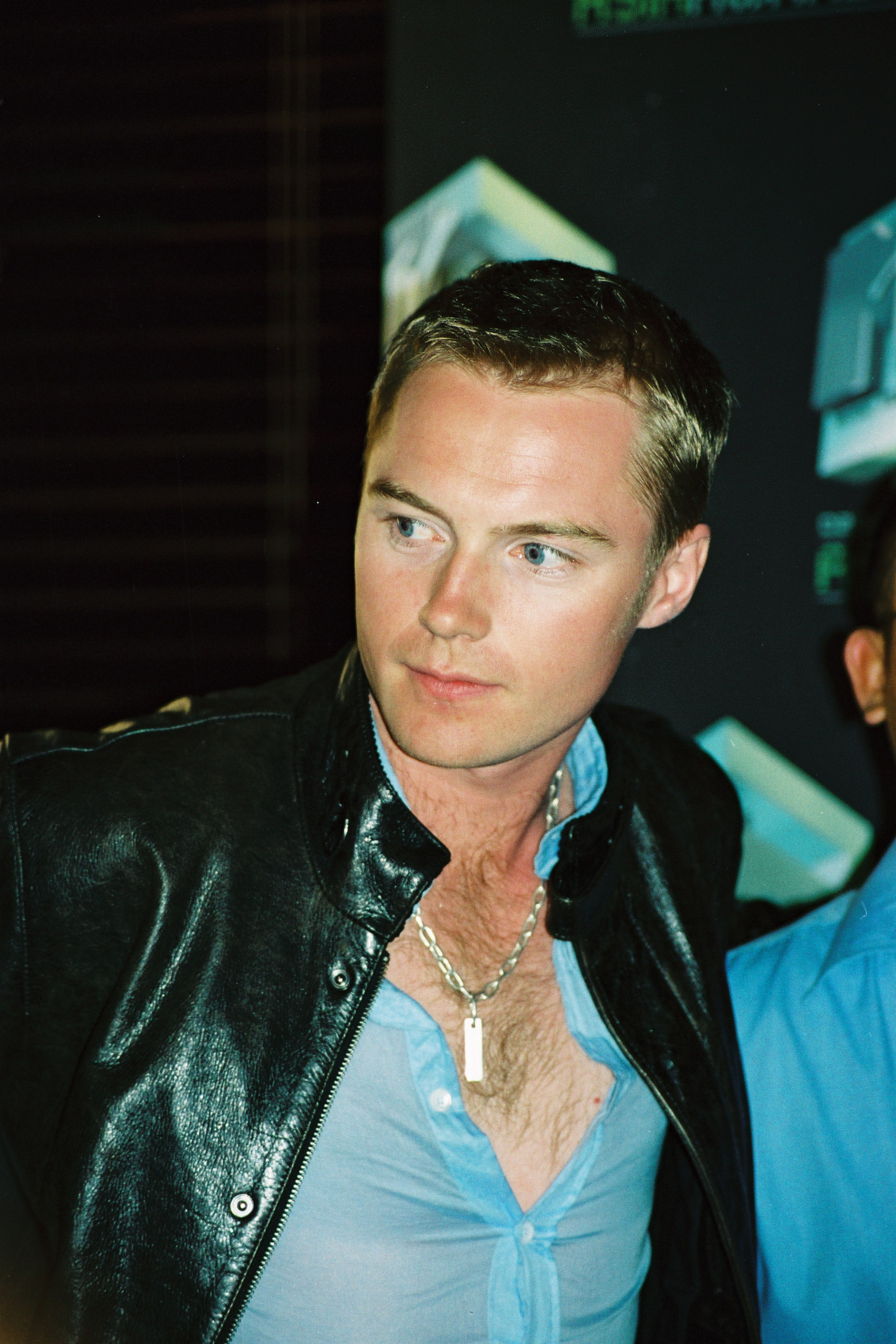
Lead singer Ronan Keating, 2002

In 1999, "When the Going Gets Tough", "You Needed Me" and "Every Day I Love You" were singles released which were worldwide hits. As well as their greatest hits compilation By Request—the highest-selling Boyzone album, having sold over 4 million copies worldwide—a tour followed from May–July 1999 in Ireland, the UK and Europe. In June 1999, Stephen Gately revealed that he was gay and was in love with the ex-Caught in the Act member Eloy de Jong. Also during this year Keating released his first solo single, "When You Say Nothing at All", which he had covered for the movie Notting Hill. In November 1999, after six years together and amid growing tensions behind the scenes, the group members decided to take some time off from Boyzone to pursue solo projects. Boyzone performed together for the last time in Ireland at the point depot during nine dates running from 3–8 January and 10–12 January 2000. They had sold more than 20 million records in total and all 16 of their singles reached the UK top five, making them the first Irish act to have four No. 1 hits in the United Kingdom charts.

For seven years after their split, the members had mixed success in their individual careers. Keating in particular remained a force in the music industry as he continued writing and managing other bands. Gately also continued his career as a solo artist, appearing in a number of West End stage musicals, and Duffy had some success as an actor, including a role in the UK television soap Coronation Street. Rumours came to a head and in early 2007 there were news reports that all five members and their manager, The X Factor judge Walsh, had met in Dublin to discuss and organise a comeback tour. On 11 October 2007, Walsh was interviewed on The Graham Norton Show; when asked by Norton whether there was going to be a re-launch of Boyzone he replied "I think so". On 5 November 2007, Keating confirmed that Boyzone would reunite for a special appearance on the BBC's annual fundraiser, Children in Need, performing a medley of hits, although had not yet commented on the possibility of a new tour or album. On 14 November 2007, it was reported that all five members of Boyzone were to begin a UK tour in May, which would be their first in seven years. On 16 November, Boyzone made a comeback appearance as part of Children in Need on BBC1 in the UK, with an Irish and UK tour announced for June 2008.

=== Back Again... No Matter What tour and Gately's death (2008–2009) ===
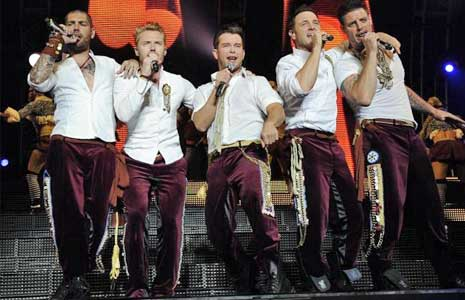
Boyzone performing in 2009

The group sold 200,000 tickets for the tour within three hours and sold 20,000 tickets on the first day of them going on sale for their concert in the RDS Dublin. Keating told the Daily Star: "We've been taking it easy on the Guinness and been out for dinners and just a couple of drinks. We're taking the tour plans very seriously. We're all on diets and we've been training in the gym every day. I'm probably the fittest now that I've ever been. I think we all look better now than before. I can't wait to be back on the road and all the guys feel the same." The 29-date tour, taking in cities such as Cardiff, Newcastle, Liverpool, London at the O2 Arena and Wembley, Manchester, Birmingham, Glasgow, Aberdeen, Sheffield, Newcastle, Nottingham, Edinburgh Castle and the RDS in Dublin.

The tour began on 25 May 2008 at Belfast's Odyssey arena and finished at Carlisle Bitts Park on 23 August 2008. On 29 August 2008 Boyzone played alongside other acts such as Sandi Thom and Scouting For Girls at an event in Blackpool to switch on the Blackpool Illuminations, an annual event in the town. The event received coverage on BBC Radio 2. On 3 September, the video for Love You Anyway debuted on the digital music channel The Box. It features all five members of the best-known lineup of Boyzone with Keating taking most of the lead vocals. The single received its first play on 20 August 2008, live on Terry Wogan's Radio 2 Breakfast show. On 6 October 2008, "Love You Anyway" entered the UK charts at No. 5, making it their 17th consecutive top five single. On 8 December their second single of 2008 "Better" was released and charted at No. 22 in the UK charts, No. 26 in the Irish charts and N. 63 in the European hot singles charts. On 28 August 2009 the group joined Yvette Fielding in Edinburgh for a Ghosthunting with... show for ITV2.

In 2009, Boyzone played their Better Tour, which was the last tour to feature Gately. On 10 October 2009, Gately died suddenly at his flat in Port d'Andratx, Mallorca. Gately's bandmates flew to Mallorca on 11 October 2009; Walsh was expected to join them soon after. The surviving members of Boyzone, Keith Duffy, Mikey Graham, Ronan Keating and Shane Lynch, issued a joint statement: Post-mortem and toxicology tests took place on 13 October and showed that Gately died from a pulmonary edema resulting from an undiagnosed heart condition.

On 16 October, accompanied by the four surviving members of Boyzone, his body was brought from Mallorca to Dublin where his funeral took place at the Church of St Laurence O'Toole the following day.

Fans responded with messages of sympathy on the social media. Boyzone manager Louis Walsh was quoted as saying: "We're all absolutely devastated. I'm in complete shock. I was only with him on Monday at an awards ceremony. We don't know much about what's happened yet. I only heard after The X Factor (UK television talent show on which Walsh is a judge) and we will rally around each other this week. He was a great man."

=== Brother and BZ20 (2010–2013) ===
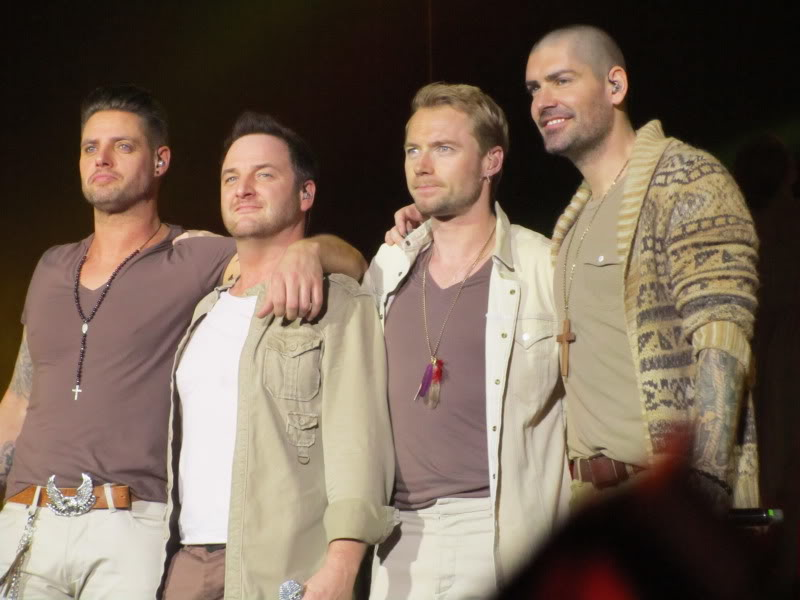
The four surviving Boyzone members during their Brother Tour

The four surviving Boyzone members were originally going to release the new album in mid-2010 with a summer tour following the album, but the album was released in March 2010 which was earlier than planned. The album was released as a tribute to Gately which included two new songs that were performed by Gately before his death. One song was written by singer-songwriter Mika, who has also claimed that the new song he wrote for Boyzone is the last one which will feature Gately's vocals in which he and Keating shared the vocals and originally the song would have led to Ronan singing first then Stephen would sing the second part prior to that, the song was released as their fourth studio album on 8 March 2010. The track written by Mika became the lead single from the new album, titled "Gave It All Away". Graham stated that "Gave It All Away" would be released on 1 March 2010 and the album was released a week afterwards. To date, the single has sold over 130,000 copies in the UK alone. The single charted in Australia and New Zealand and peaked at No. 9 on the UK Singles Chart and at No. 1 on the Irish Singles Chart.

Boyzone's fourth studio album, Brother, was released on 8 March 2010 and became their fourth studio number one album so far in both Ireland and the UK selling 400,000 copies in the UK, 30,000 copies in Republic of Ireland and 7,000 in Germany, the album also charted in several other European countries, Australia and in the top ten in New Zealand. It has sold over 600,000 copies worldwide as of 2012. "Love Is a Hurricane" was the second and final single from Brother. It was released on 17 May, peaking at No. 44 on the UK Singles Chart and at No. 39 on the Irish Singles Chart, selling 12,000 copies. In mid-2010, it was announced that they would be touring the UK and Ireland during February and March 2011 with a 21 date tour of Ireland and UK with their arena-based Brother Tour and four outdoor shows around the UK during August, the tour was seen by 160,000 fans and the tour grossed million in total. A Huge contribution to the background and lead vocals in their tours since 2011 has come from backing vocalist Jo Garland who has sung with Ronan Keating in his solo ventures since 2001 and with Boyzone since 2008, her vocals have been more prominent often covering for vocals that Stephen Gately sung. A DVD of the tour from The O2 Arena will be released in December 2013. Boyzone performed "No Matter What" with Kym Marsh on an ITV programme called Coronation Street: The Big 50, broadcast on ITV1 on 10 December 2010, but Graham was not present due to other commitments.

Lynch said in an interview on ITV1 show Loose Women that Boyzone will be releasing a new album and be touring in 2013 which will celebrate the 20th anniversary of the band forming. Duffy told The Sun newspaper: "We've plans in place for a tour and an album next year for the 20th anniversary - that's if people want to come and see us!" Tickets for the anniversary tour BZ20 went on sale on 14 February 2013, the tour was released in a cd format and include the DVD of their 2011 tour which has been held back from release until December 2013. As part of the 20th anniversary the band recorded a programme on 12 June 2013 which aired on Irish channel RTÉ One on 27 August called "Boyzone - For One Night Only". On 24 September 2013, the band performed one of the songs from their new album called "Love Will Save the Day" on The X Factor Australia. It was announced on the same day that the brand new album will be released on 25 November 2013 and became available to pre-order from Amazon. Boyzone released their new studio album BZ20 in November 2013 and it sold 200,000 copies in the UK, peaking at number 6 in the UK charts and number 7 in the Irish charts. Love Will save The Day was released a week previously and peaked at number 39 in the UK charts selling 20,000 copies.

=== From Dublin to Detroit and Asian/UK festivals (2014–2017) ===
In early 2014, a compilation album Love Me for a Reason: The Collection was released and it has charted in Ireland and Belgium. In 2014, further dates were added to their BZ20 Tour. On 17 July 2014, it was announced that Boyzone would be releasing a sixth studio album called From Dublin To Detroit, a 12-song album with covers of motown hits. Keith Duffy said "We're basically just covering some of our favourite songs from the Motown era, and putting a full album together. So we've got 12 really exciting tracks coming out. It's going to give us a whole new catalogue of music to perform. And it will be very interesting how it fits in with our own back catalogue. It's kind of rejuvenating us. It's giving us just good times and good memories in the studio. So fingers crossed people will receive it well and it goes well for us." On 29 September 2014 a few songs from the album were announced on Twitter; Upon release, the album Dublin to Detroit featured 11 songs with a deluxe version having an extra 2 songs. The album sold 90,000 copies in the UK. In 2015, Boyzone toured Asia, England and Scotland with 12 dates. Boyzone toured the UK in late summer of 2017 along with 4 outdoor dates in Chelmsford City Racecourse, Derby County Cricket Ground, Hastings Pier and Windsor Racecourse.

=== Thank You & Goodnight and anniversaries (2018–2026) ===
In December 2017, it was announced that the album had been finalized and was ready for release in 2018. In April 2018, it was confirmed that Boyzone would release a new studio album in September and tour the UK in 2018 with arena shows. Keith Duffy announced in March 2017 that Boyzone had signed a contract with Warner Music for an album and an arena tour. The album was titled Thank You & Goodnight.

The album was released on 16 November 2018 by Warner Music and peaked at number 10 in Ireland and 6 in the UK. Shane Lynch compared the album's style to that of American singer Charlie Puth, and both Sam Smith and Ed Sheeran wrote some material for the album.

The group disbanded in 2019 after the final shows of their farewell tour at the London Palladium.

It was speculated that the band would reform for their 30th anniversary in 2023 with a new album and tour, but Keating ruled this out, citing band member Gately's death as the reason.

Following the success of the 2025 Sky documentary Boyzone: No Matter What, the band announced a farewell concert to take place in June 2026 at the Emirates Stadium.

== Discography ==
- Said and Done (1995)
- A Different Beat (1996)
- Where We Belong (1998)
- Brother (2010)
- BZ20 (2013)
- Dublin to Detroit (2014)
- Thank You & Goodnight (2018)

== Tours ==
- 1996–1997: A Different Beat Tour
- 1998: Where We Belong Tour
- 1999–2000: By Request Tour
- 2008: Back Again... No Matter What Tour
- 2009: Better Tour
- 2011: Brother Tour
- 2013–2015; 2017: BZ20 Tour
- 2018–2019: Thank You & Goodnight Tour
- 2026: Two for the Road

== Awards and nominations ==
Year	Nominee / work	Award	Result
1999	Boyzone	BRIT Award for Best International Group	Won
1999	"When the Going Gets Tough"	BRIT Award for Best International Single	Won
1999	By Request	MTV Europe Music Award for Best Album	Won
1999	Boyzone	MTV Europe Music Award for Best Pop	Nominated
1999	Boyzone	MTV Europe Music Award for Best UK and Ireland Act	Won
1998	"No Matter What"	BRIT Award for Best International Single	Won
1998	"No Matter What"	The Record of the Year for Best Single	Won
1998	Boyzone	MTV Europe Music Award for Best Pop	Nominated
1997	Boyzone	BRIT Award for Best International Group	Won
1997	Boyzone	Irish Music Awards for Best Group	Won
1997	"Picture of You"	Ivor Novello Award for Best Contemporary Song	Won
1996	Boyzone	BRIT Award for Best International Newcomer	Nominated
1996	Boyzone	Metro Broadcast Corporation Hit Awards for Best Team Achievement	Won
1995	Boyzone	Smash Hits poll winner for Best New Act	Won

Preceded by Nils Gaup & Runar Borge	Eurovision Song Contest; Final Interval act 1997	Succeeded by Jupiter, The Bringer of Joviality
