= List of UK top-ten singles in 1995 =

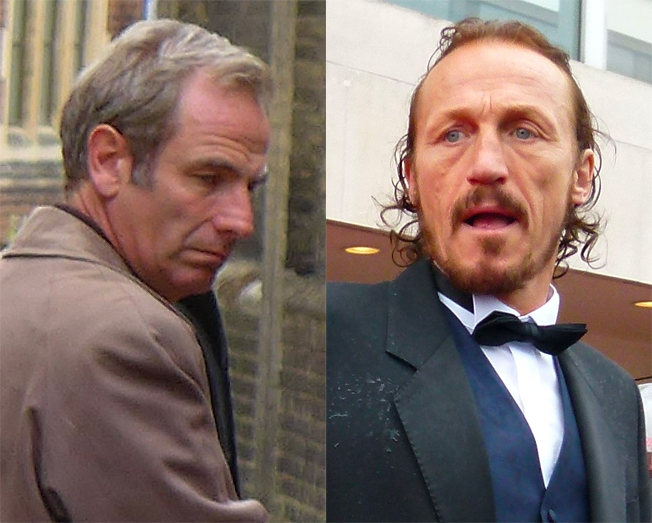
Robson & Jerome, who rose to prominence via the television series Soldier Soldier, achieved the best-selling single of 1995 with "Unchained Melody"/"White Cliffs of Dover", which spent seven weeks at number-one in May and June and has since sold 1,800,000 copies in the UK alone. They scored a second number-one hit in November with "I Believe"/"Up on the Roof", which became the year's third best seller.

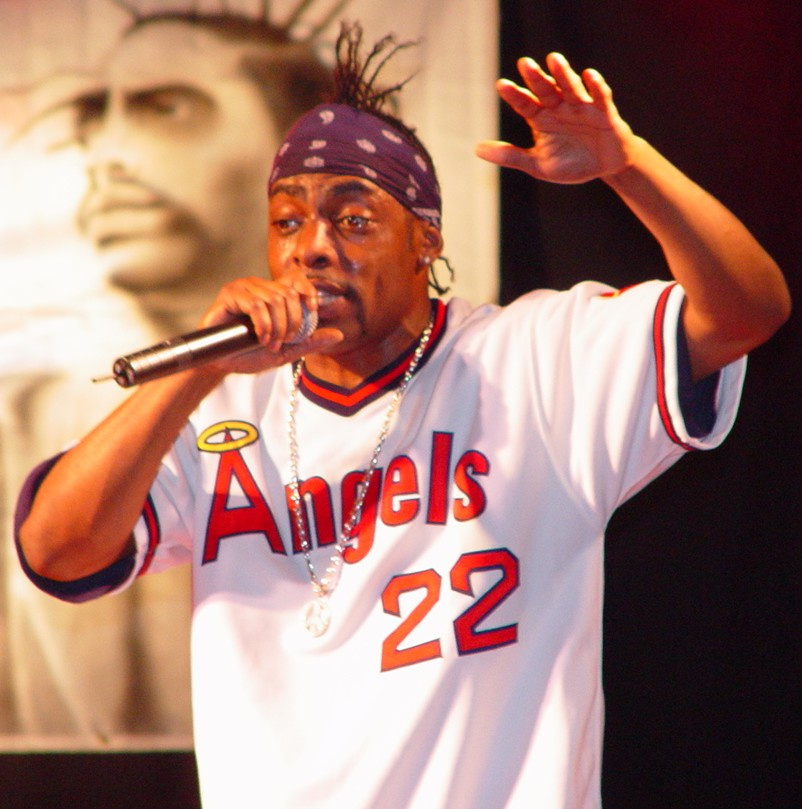
Coolio (pictured in 2002) had the second best selling single of this year with his signature song "Gangsta's Paradise", featuring guest vocals from L.V., which spent two weeks at number-one and lasted 12 weeks in the top 10 altogether.

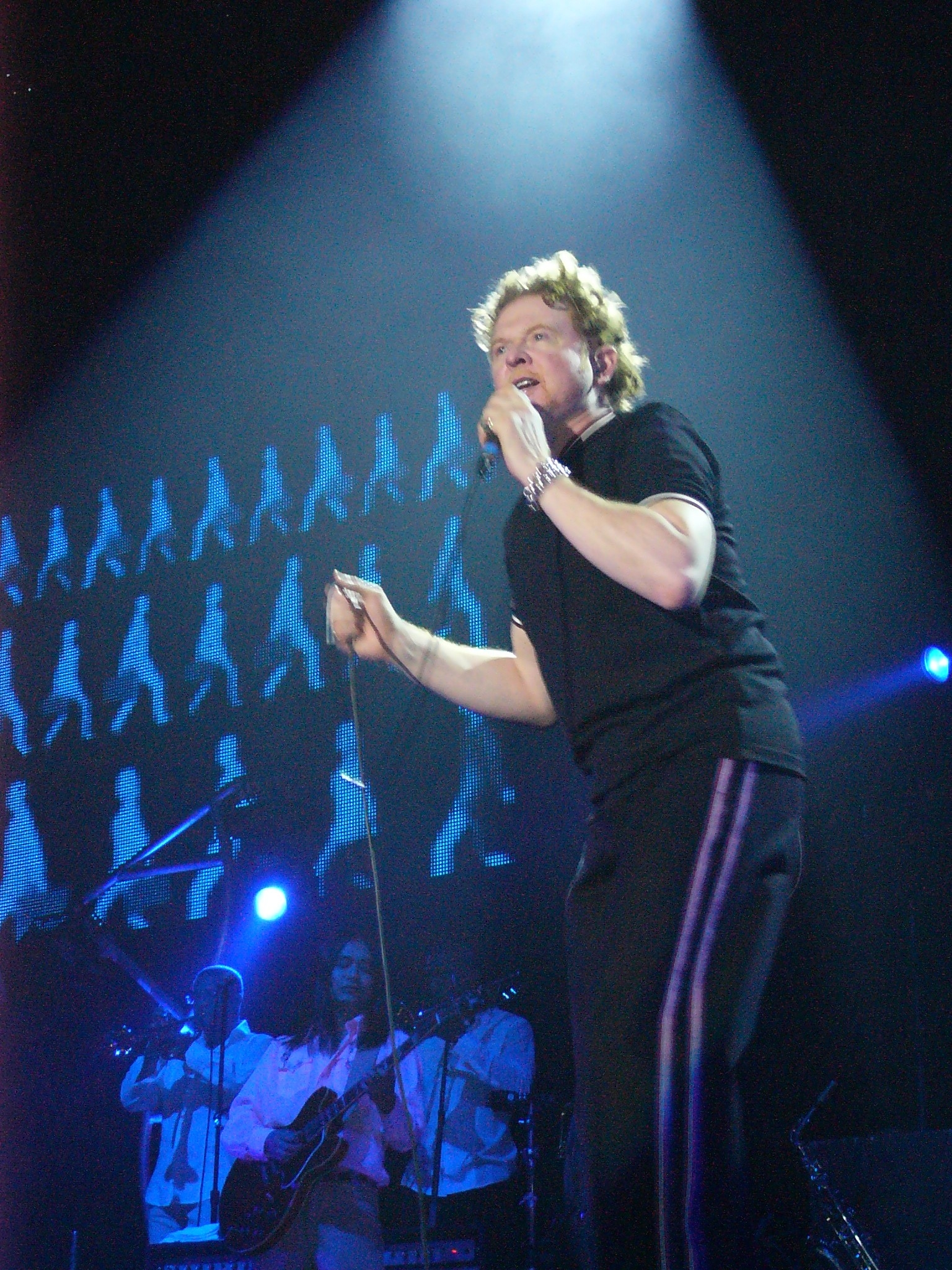
Mick Hucknall (pictured in 2003) and his band Simply Red scored their first and only UK number-one single in September of this year with "Fairground", which topped the chart for four weeks.

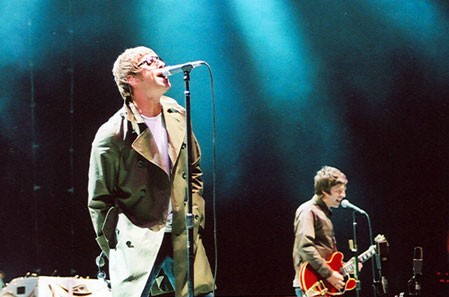
Oasis achieved four top 10 singles in 1995. These included "Some Might Say", which became the band's first number-one single, and "Wonderwall", which spent 11 weeks in the top 10 and is now Oasis' biggest-selling single in the UK.

The UK Singles Chart is one of many music charts compiled by the Official Charts Company that calculates the best-selling singles of the week in the United Kingdom. Before 2004, the chart was only based on the sales of physical singles. This list shows singles that peaked in the Top 10 of the UK Singles Chart during 1995, as well as singles which peaked in 1994 and 1996 but were in the top 10 in 1995. The entry date is when the single appeared in the top 10 for the first time (week ending, as published by the Official Charts Company, which is six days after the chart is announced).

One-hundred and fifty-three singles were in the top ten in 1995. Nine singles from 1994 remained in the top 10 for several weeks at the beginning of the year, while "I Am Blessed" by Eternal was released in 1995 but did not reach its peak until 1996. "Another Day" by Whigfield, "Cotton Eye Joe" by Rednex, "Love Me for a Reason" by Boyzone, "Them Girls, Them Girls" by Zig and Zag and "Think Twice" by Celine Dion were the singles from 1994 to reach their peak in 1995. Sixty-one artists scored multiple entries in the top 10 in 1995. Coolio, Foo Fighters, Mary J. Blige, N-Trance and Supergrass were among the many artists who achieved their first UK charting top 10 single in 1995.

The 1994 Christmas number-one, "Stay Another Day" by East 17, remained at number-one for the first week of 1995. The first new number-one single of the year was "Cotton Eye Joe" by Rednex. Overall, seventeen different singles peaked at number-one in 1995, with Michael Jackson, The Outhere Brothers, Robson & Jerome and Take That (2) having the joint most singles hit that position.

== Background ==
=== Multiple entries ===
One-hundred and fifty-three singles charted in the top 10 in 1995, with one-hundred and forty-eight singles reaching their peak this year.

Sixty-one artists scored multiple entries in the top 10 in 1995. The five members of Irish boyband Boyzone (Keith Duffy, Michael Graham, Ronan Keating, Shane Lynch and Stephen Gately) shared the record for the most top ten singles in 1995 with five hit singles each. "Father and Son" was Boyzone's biggest hit of the year: it peaked at number 2 in December and spent eight weeks in the top 10. "Love Me for a Reason" also reached number 2 in January, "So Good" made number 3 in August, and "Key to My Life" charted at the same position in April. The group also gave up their time for the Childliners charity record "The Gift of Christmas", peaking at number nine.

Blur were one of a number of artists with two top-ten entries, including the number-one single "Country House". Bobby Brown, Eternal, M People, Shaggy and Take That were among the other artists who had multiple top 10 entries in 1995.

=== Chart debuts ===
Sixty artists achieved their first top 10 single in 1995, either as a lead or featured artist. Of these, eight went on to record another hit single that year: Black Grape, Björk, N-Trance, Nightcrawlers, Paul Oakenfold, Robson & Jerome, Scatman John and Supergrass. Clock, MN8, The Outhere Brothers and Pulp all had two other entries in their breakthrough year.

The following table (collapsed on desktop site) does not include acts who had previously charted as part of a group and secured their first top 10 solo single.

Artist	Number of top 10s	First entry	Chart position	Other entries	
Ini Kamoze	1	"Here Comes the Hotstepper"	4	—	
N-Trance	2	"Set You Free"	2	"Stayin' Alive" (2)	
Nicki French	1	"Total Eclipse of the Heart"	5	—	
Green Day	1	"Basket Case"	7	—	
MN8	3	"I've Got a Little Something for You"	2	"If You Only Let Me In" (6), "Happy" (8)	
Bill Whelan	1	"Riverdance"	9	—	
Perfecto Allstarz	1	"Reach Up (Papa's Got a Brand New Pigbag)"	6	—	
Paul Oakenfold	2	"Reach Up (Papa's Got a Brand New Pigbag)"	6	"Not Over Yet" (6)	
Alex Party	1	"Don't Give Me Your Life"	2	—	
Nightcrawlers	2	"Push the Feeling On"	3	"Surrender Your Love" (7)	
The Bucketheads	1	"The Bomb! (These Sounds Fall into My Mind)"	5	—	
The Boo Radleys	1	"Wake Up Boo!"	9	—	
Clock	3	"Axel F"/"Keep Pushin'"	7	"Whoomp! (There It Is)" (4), "Everybody" (6)	
Freak Power	1	"Turn On, Tune In, Cop Out"	2	—	
The Outhere Brothers	3	"Don't Stop (Wiggle Wiggle)"	1	"Boom Boom Boom" (1), "La La La Hey Hey" (7)	
Strike	1	"U Sure Do"	4	—	
Grace	1	"Not Over Yet"	6	—	
Brownstone	1	"If You Love Me"	8	—	
Tina Arena	1	"Chains"	6	—	
Deuce	1	"I Need You"	10	—	
Björk	2	"Army of Me"	10	"It's Oh So Quiet" (4)	
Livin' Joy	1	"Dreamer"	1	—	
Scatman John	2	"Scatman (Ski-Ba-Bop-Ba-Dop-Bop)"	3	"Scatman's World" (10)	
Supergrass	2	"Lenny"	10	"Alright"/"Time" (2)	
Robson & Jerome	2	"Unchained Melody"/"White Cliffs of Dover"	1	"I Believe"/"Up on the Roof" (1)	
The Manchester United 1995 Football Squad	1	"We're Gonna Do It Again"	6	—	
Stryker	1	"We're Gonna Do It Again"	6	—	
Love City Groove	1	"Love City Groove"	7	—	
Billie Ray Martin	1	"Your Loving Arms"	6	—	
McAlmont & Butler	1	"Yes"	8	—	
Pulp	3	"Common People"	3	"Mis-Shapes"/"Sorted for E's & Wizz" (2), "Disco 2000" (7)	
Black Grape	2	"Reverend Black Grape"	9	"In the Name of the Father" (8)	
Jam & Spoon	1	"Right in the Night (Fall in Love with Music)"	10	—	
Plavka	1	"Right in the Night (Fall in Love with Music)"	10	—	
Foo Fighters	1	"This Is a Call"	5	—	
Reeves & Mortimer	1	"I'm a Believer"	3	—	
Diana King	1	"Shy Guy"	2	—	
Dana Dawson	1	"3 is Family"	9	—	
Method Man	1	"I'll Be There for You/You're All I Need to Get By"	10	—	
Mary J. Blige	1	"I'll Be There for You/You're All I Need to Get By"	10	—	
TLC	1	"Waterfalls"	4	—	
The Original	1	"I Luv U Baby"	2	—	
JX	1	"Son of a Gun"	6	—	
Berri	1	"Sunshine After the Rain"	4	—	
The Rembrandts	1	"I'll Be There for You"	3	—	
De'Lacy	1	"Hideaway"	9	—	
Ricardo da Force	1	"Stayin' Alive"	2	—	
Roy Chubby Brown	1	"Living Next Door to Alice (Who the F**k is Alice?)"	3	—	
Josh Wink	1	"Higher State of Consciousness"	8	—	
Coolio	1	"Gangsta's Paradise"	1	—	
Coolio	1	"Gangsta's Paradise"	1	—	L.V.
Happy Clappers	1	"I Believe"	7	—	
Passengers	1	"Miss Sarajevo"	6	—	
Childliners	1	"The Gift of Christmas"	9	—	
Peter Andre	1	"The Gift of Christmas"	9	—	
Sean Maguire	1	"The Gift of Christmas"	9	—	
The Mike Flowers Pops	1	"Wonderwall"	2	—	

Notes

Italian brothers Gianni and Paolo Visnadi made their chart debuts with two separate acts, charting first as members of Alex Party and later in the year with Livin' Joy. UB40's Ali Campbell charted for the first time as a solo artist in 1995, "That Look in Your Eye" peaking at number five in May. John Reid was credited as a featured artist for the Nightcrawlers single "Surrender Your Love" but he was actually part of the band.

The duo McAlmont & Butler consisted of singer David McAlmont and guitarist Bernard Butler, the latter who was in Suede until his departure the previous year, The group had their first hit with the number 7 single "Animal Nitrate" in 1993. Former Happy Mondays members Shaun Ryder and Mark "Bez" Berry became part of the line-up of newly created Black Grape. Edwyn Collins first found fame with Orange Juice in the mid-1980s but went it alone on number 4 hit "A Girl Like You".

Vic Reeves of the comedy partnership Reeves & Mortimer had previous chart entries to his name with 1991's "Born Free" and "Dizzy". Bob Mortimer was making his debut in the top 10. Suggs launched a solo career while still an active member of Madness, scoring a top 10 single with double-A side "I'm Only Sleeping"/"Off On Holiday".

Ricardo da Force had his first official entry as a featured artist on N-Trance's cover of "Stayin' Alive" but he had performed vocals on The KLF chart topper "3 a.m. Eternal", as well as their other singles "Last Train to Trancentral" and "Justified & Ancient", and Adamski's "The Space Jungle". Prince adopted the new moniker Artist Formerly Known as Prince from 1995 onwards, charting with "Gold" which landed at number ten.

The Childliners charity single "The Gift of Christmas" saw a collective of new and veteran chart acts uniting to raise money for Childline. Members of Boyzone, China Black, East 17, Let Loose and Ultimate Kaos all had previous top 10 credits to their name prior to 1995, as did solo artists C. J. Lewis, Dannii Minogue, Michelle Gayle and West End. Deuce, MN8 and Nightcrawlers all debuted earlier in 1995 but the band members all featured as individuals instead of the group's line-up. A.S.A.P., Backstreet Boys, E.Y.C., Gemini and The Flood were the groups whose line-up's first credit was on this record. Peter Andre and Sean Maguire were the two solo artists for which "The Gift of Christmas" was their first top 10 single of any description.

=== Songs from films ===
Original songs from various films entered the top 10 throughout the year. These included "Here Comes the Hotstepper" (from Pret-a-Porter), "Have You Ever Really Loved a Woman?" (Don Juan DeMarco), "Hold Me, Thrill Me, Kiss Me, Kill Me" and "Kiss from a Rose" (Batman Forever), "Shy Guy" (Bad Boys), "Gangsta's Paradise" (Dangerous Minds) and "GoldenEye" (GoldenEye).

Additionally, the K-Klass remix "The Best Things in Life Are Free" from Mo' Money charted in the top ten. Although the single itself did not promote the film, the music video was assembled from footage of the film.

=== Charity singles ===
Several singles raising money for different charitable causes reached the top ten this year. The Comic Relief single was an all-star collaboration between Cher, Chrissie Hynde, Neneh Cherry and Eric Clapton, a cover version of "Love Can Build a Bridge". It topped the chart for one week on 25 March 1995 (week ending).

The charity collective Childliners, which included members of bands including Boyzone, Backstreet Boys and Let Loose, produced a single in aid of Childline entitled "The Gift of Christmas". Its highest position was number 9, which it reached on 16 December 1995 (week ending), staying there for two weeks.

=== Best-selling singles ===
Robson & Jerome had the biggest-selling single of 1995 with the double-A side "Unchained Melody"/"White Cliffs of Dover", which spent ten weeks in the top 10 (including seven weeks at number-one), sold over 1.8 million copies and was certified 2× platinum by the BPI. "Gangsta's Paradise" by Coolio featuring L.V. came in second place. Robson & Jerome's "I Believe"/"Up on the Roof", "Back for Good" from Take That and "Think Twice" by Celine Dion made up the top five. Singles by Michael Jackson ("Earth Song"), Simply Red, Michael Jackson ("You Are Not Alone"), Everything but the Girl and Oasis were also in the top ten best-selling singles of the year.

"Unchained Melody"/"White Cliffs of Dover" (2) also ranked in the top 10 best-selling singles of the decade.

== Top-ten singles ==
Key

Symbol	Meaning
‡	Single peaked in 1994 but still in chart in 1995.
♦	Single released in 1995 but peaked in 1996.
(#)	Year-end top-ten single position and rank
Entered	The date that the single first appeared in the chart.
Peak	Highest position that the single reached in the UK Singles Chart.

Entered (week ending)	Weeks in top 10	Single	Artist	Peak	Peak reached (week ending)	Weeks at peak
Singles in 1994
26 November 1994	7	"Crocodile Shoes" ‡	Jimmy Nail	4	10 December 1994	1
3 December 1994	8	"Stay Another Day" ‡	East 17	1	10 December 1994	5
10 December 1994	5	"All I Want for Christmas Is You" ‡	Mariah Carey	2	17 December 1994	3
10 December 1994	17	"Think Twice" (#5)	Celine Dion	1	4 February 1995	7
10 December 1994	8	"Love Me for a Reason"	Boyzone	2	7 January 1995	1
17 December 1994	2	"Another Day" ^{[A]}	Whigfield	7	7 January 1995	1
24 December 1994	10	"Cotton Eye Joe"	Rednex	1	14 January 1995	3
24 December 1994	4	"Them Girls, Them Girls"	Zig and Zag	5	7 January 1995	1
31 December 1994	4	"Whatever" ‡	Oasis	3	31 December 1994	1
Singles in 1995
7 January 1995	9	"Here Comes the Hotstepper"	Ini Kamoze	4	21 January 1995	4
14 January 1995	9	"Set You Free"	N-Trance	2	11 February 1995	1
14 January 1995	4	"Tell Me When"	The Human League	6	21 January 1995	2
14 January 1995	1	"Sympathy for the Devil"	Guns N' Roses	9	14 January 1995	1
21 January 1995	5	"Total Eclipse of the Heart"	Nicki French	5	28 January 1995	3
21 January 1995	2	"Bump n' Grind"	R. Kelly	8	28 January 1995	1
28 January 1995	2	"Basket Case"	Green Day	7	28 January 1995	1
28 January 1995	1	"She's a River"	Simple Minds	9	28 January 1995	1
4 February 1995	3	"Run Away"	M.C. Sar & Real McCoy	6	4 February 1995	1
4 February 1995	7	"I've Got a Little Something for You"	MN8	2	4 March 1995	1
4 February 1995	2	"Riverdance" ^{[B]}	Bill Whelan	9	4 February 1995	1
11 February 1995	5	"Reach Up (Papa's Got a Brand New Pigbag)"	Perfecto Allstarz ^{[C]}	6	4 March 1995	1
11 February 1995	1	"Open Your Heart"	M People	9	11 February 1995	1
18 February 1995	4	"No More 'I Love You's'"	Annie Lennox	2	18 February 1995	2
18 February 1995	8	"Don't Give Me Your Life"	Alex Party	2	11 March 1995	2
25 February 1995	1	"Bedtime Story"	Madonna	4	25 February 1995	1
25 February 1995	2	"Someday I'll Be Saturday Night"	Bon Jovi	7	4 March 1995	1
4 March 1995	4	"Push the Feeling On"	Nightcrawlers	3	11 March 1995	1
11 March 1995	4	"The Bomb! (These Sounds Fall into My Mind)" ^{[D]}	The Bucketheads ^{[E]}	5	11 March 1995	1
11 March 1995	1	"Wake Up Boo!"	The Boo Radleys	9	11 March 1995	1
11 March 1995	3	"Axel F"/"Keep Pushin'"	Clock	7	18 March 1995	1
18 March 1995	3	"Turn On, Tune In, Cop Out" ^{[F]}	Freak Power	3	18 March 1995	1
18 March 1995	4	"Love Can Build a Bridge" ^{[G]}	Cher, Chrissie Hynde & Neneh Cherry with Eric Clapton	1	25 March 1995	1
18 March 1995	9	"Don't Stop (Wiggle Wiggle)"	The Outhere Brothers	1	1 April 1995	1
18 March 1995	2	"Whoops Now"/"What'll I Do"	Janet Jackson	9	25 March 1995	1
25 March 1995	4	"Julia Says"	Wet Wet Wet	3	1 April 1995	1
1 April 1995	7	"Two Can Play That Game"	Bobby Brown	3	8 April 1995	4
1 April 1995	4	"U Sure Do"	Strike	4	8 April 1995	2
1 April 1995	2	"Baby It's You"	The Beatles	7	1 April 1995	1
1 April 1995	1	"Let It Rain"	East 17	10	1 April 1995	1
8 April 1995	7	"Back for Good" (#4)	Take That	1	8 April 1995	4
8 April 1995	4	"Baby Baby"	Corona	5	15 April 1995	2
8 April 1995	3	"Not Over Yet"	Grace	6	15 April 1995	1
15 April 1995	3	"If You Love Me"	Brownstone	8	15 April 1995	2
15 April 1995	1	"Strange Currencies"	R.E.M.	9	15 April 1995	1
22 April 1995	3	"Have You Ever Really Loved a Woman?"	Bryan Adams	4	22 April 1995	1
22 April 1995	5	"Chains"	Tina Arena	6	6 May 1995	1
22 April 1995	1	"I Need You"	Deuce	10	22 April 1995	1
29 April 1995	3	"Key to My Life"	Boyzone	3	6 May 1995	1
29 April 1995	2	"If You Only Let Me In"	MN8	6	29 April 1995	1
29 April 1995	1	"Best in Me"	Let Loose	8	29 April 1995	1
6 May 1995	3	"Some Might Say"	Oasis	1	6 May 1995	1
6 May 1995	1	"The Changingman"	Paul Weller	7	6 May 1995	1
6 May 1995	1	"Army of Me"	Björk	10	6 May 1995	1
13 May 1995	4	"Dreamer"	Livin' Joy	1	13 May 1995	1
13 May 1995	6	"Guaglione"	Perez 'Prez' Prado & His Orchestra	2	27 May 1995	1
13 May 1995	6	"Scatman (Ski-Ba-Bop-Ba-Dop-Bop)"	Scatman John	3	27 May 1995	1
13 May 1995	1	"Lenny"	Supergrass	10	13 May 1995	1
20 May 1995	10	"Unchained Melody"/"White Cliffs of Dover" (#1)	Robson & Jerome	1	20 May 1995	7
20 May 1995	2	"We're Gonna Do It Again" ^{[H]}	The Manchester United 1995 Football Squad featuring Stryker	6	20 May 1995	1
20 May 1995	1	"Love City Groove" ^{[I]}	Love City Groove	7	20 May 1995	1
20 May 1995	4	"Your Loving Arms"	Billie Ray Martin	6	27 May 1995	1
27 May 1995	3	"That Look in Your Eye"	Ali Campbell	5	27 May 1995	1
27 May 1995	2	"Surrender Your Love"	Nightcrawlers featuring John Reid	7	27 May 1995	2
27 May 1995	1	"Only One Road"	Celine Dion	8	27 May 1995	1
27 May 1995	2	"Yes"	McAlmont & Butler	8	3 June 1995	1
3 June 1995	4	"Common People"	Pulp	2	3 June 1995	2
3 June 1995	5	"(Everybody's Got to Learn Sometime) I Need Your Loving"	Baby D	3	24 June 1995	1
10 June 1995	4	"Scream" ^{[J]}	Michael Jackson & Janet Jackson	3	10 June 1995	1
10 June 1995	2	"This Ain't a Love Song"	Bon Jovi	6	17 June 1995	1
10 June 1995	1	"Reverend Black Grape"	Black Grape	9	10 June 1995	1
17 June 1995	8	"Hold Me, Thrill Me, Kiss Me, Kill Me"	U2	2	17 June 1995	2
17 June 1995	3	"Think of You"	Whigfield	7	17 June 1995	2
17 June 1995	1	"Right in the Night (Fall in Love with Music)"	Jam & Spoon featuring Plavka	10	17 June 1995	1
24 June 1995	9	"Boom Boom Boom"	The Outhere Brothers	1	8 July 1995	4
24 June 1995	1	"Don't Want to Forgive Me Now"	Wet Wet Wet	7	24 June 1995	1
24 June 1995	1	"Search for the Hero"	M People	9	24 June 1995	1
24 June 1995	7	"A Girl Like You"	Edwyn Collins	4	22 July 1995	1
1 July 1995	3	"Whoomp! (There It Is)"	Clock	4	1 July 1995	1
1 July 1995	1	"This Is a Call"	Foo Fighters	5	1 July 1995	1
1 July 1995	1	"Stillness in Time"	Jamiroquai	9	1 July 1995	1
8 July 1995	2	"I'm a Believer"	EMF & Reeves & Mortimer	3	8 July 1995	1
8 July 1995	7	"Shy Guy"	Diana King	2	29 July 1995	1
8 July 1995	1	"Shoot Me with Your Love"	D:Ream	7	8 July 1995	1
8 July 1995	1	"Humpin' Around"	Bobby Brown	8	8 July 1995	1
8 July 1995	4	"In the Summertime"	Shaggy featuring Rayvon	5	22 July 1995	1
15 July 1995	5	"Alright"/"Time"	Supergrass	2	15 July 1995	2
15 July 1995	1	"Happy"	MN8	8	15 July 1995	1
22 July 1995	6	"Kiss from a Rose"/"I'm Alive"	Seal	4	5 August 1995	2
22 July 1995	1	"You Do Something to Me"	Paul Weller	9	22 July 1995	1
22 July 1995	2	"3 Is Family"	Dana Dawson	9	29 July 1995	1
29 July 1995	5	"Try Me Out"	Corona	6	5 August 1995	2
29 July 1995	1	"I'll Be There for You/You're All I Need to Get By"	Method Man featuring Mary J. Blige	10	29 July 1995	1
5 August 1995	5	"Never Forget"	Take That	1	5 August 1995	3
5 August 1995	1	"In the Name of the Father"	Black Grape	8	5 August 1995	1
12 August 1995	2	"So Good"	Boyzone	3	12 August 1995	2
12 August 1995	2	"I'm Only Sleeping"/"Off On Holiday"	Suggs	7	12 August 1995	1
12 August 1995	6	"Waterfalls"	TLC	4	19 August 1995	1
12 August 1995	1	"Don't You Want Me (1995 Remixes)" ^{[K]}	Felix	10	12 August 1995	1
19 August 1995	4	"I Luv U Baby"	The Original	2	19 August 1995	1
19 August 1995	2	"Son of a Gun" ^{[L]}	JX	6	19 August 1995	1
26 August 1995	4	"Country House"	Blur	1	26 August 1995	2
26 August 1995	4	"Roll with It"	Oasis	2	26 August 1995	2
26 August 1995	2	"Everybody"	Clock	6	26 August 1995	1
26 August 1995	1	"Human Nature"	Madonna	8	26 August 1995	1
2 September 1995	9	"You Are Not Alone" (#8)	Michael Jackson	1	9 September 1995	2
2 September 1995	4	"Sunshine After the Rain"	Berri	4	9 September 1995	1
2 September 1995	6	"I'll Be There for You" ^{[M]}	The Rembrandts	3	9 September 1995	2
2 September 1995	2	"Hideaway"	De'Lacy	9	2 September 1995	2
9 September 1995	1	"I Feel Love (1995 Remixes)" ^{[N]}	Donna Summer	8	9 September 1995	1
9 September 1995	1	"Scatman's World"	Scatman John	10	9 September 1995	1
16 September 1995	5	"Stayin' Alive"	N-Trance featuring Ricardo da Force	2	16 September 1995	1
16 September 1995	2	"Can I Touch You... There?"	Michael Bolton	6	16 September 1995	1
16 September 1995	1	"Pour que tu m'aimes encore"	Celine Dion	7	16 September 1995	1
16 September 1995	8	"Living Next Door to Alice (Who the F**k is Alice?)"	Smokie featuring Roy Chubby Brown	3	21 October 1995	1
23 September 1995	7	"Boombastic"	Shaggy	1	23 September 1995	1
23 September 1995	5	"Fantasy"	Mariah Carey	4	23 September 1995	2
23 September 1995	2	"Runaway"	Janet Jackson	6	23 September 1995	1
23 September 1995	2	"La La La Hey Hey"	The Outhere Brothers	7	23 September 1995	1
30 September 1995	7	"Fairground" (#7)	Simply Red	1	30 September 1995	4
30 September 1995	2	"Somewhere Somehow"	Wet Wet Wet	7	7 October 1995	1
7 October 1995	3	"Mis-Shapes"/"Sorted for E's & Wizz"	Pulp	2	7 October 1995	2
7 October 1995	1	"Something for the Pain"	Bon Jovi	8	7 October 1995	1
7 October 1995	1	"Man on the Edge"	Iron Maiden	10	7 October 1995	1
14 October 1995	5	"When Love & Hate Collide"	Def Leppard	2	21 October 1995	1
14 October 1995	2	"Light of My Life"	Louise ^{[O]}	8	14 October 1995	1
21 October 1995	3	"Power of a Woman"	Eternal ^{[O]}	5	21 October 1995	1
21 October 1995	2	"Higher State of Consciousness"	Josh Wink	8	21 October 1995	1
28 October 1995	12	"Gangsta's Paradise" (#2)	Coolio featuring L.V.	1	28 October 1995	2
28 October 1995	4	"I'd Lie for You (And That's the Truth)"	Meat Loaf	2	28 October 1995	1
28 October 1995	14	"Missing (Todd Terry Remix)" (#9)	Everything but the Girl	3	25 November 1995	2
4 November 1995	3	"Heaven for Everyone"	Queen	2	4 November 1995	1
4 November 1995	3	"Thunder"	East 17	4	4 November 1995	1
11 November 1995	9	"I Believe"/"Up on the Roof" (#3)	Robson & Jerome	1	11 November 1995	4
11 November 1995	11	"Wonderwall" (#10) ^{[P]}	Oasis	2	11 November 1995	1
11 November 1995	4	"You'll See"	Madonna	5	18 November 1995	1
18 November 1995	1	"I Believe"	Happy Clappers	7	18 November 1995	1
18 November 1995	1	"GoldenEye"	Tina Turner	10	18 November 1995	1
25 November 1995	1	"The Universal"	Blur	5	25 November 1995	1
25 November 1995	2	"Anywhere Is"	Enya	7	25 November 1995	2
25 November 1995	10	"Father and Son"	Boyzone	2	23 December 1995	2
25 November 1995	8	"It's Oh So Quiet"	Björk	4	23 December 1995	3
25 November 1995	2	"Lie to Me"	Bon Jovi	10	25 November 1995	2
2 December 1995	1	"Miss Sarajevo"	Passengers ^{[Q]}	6	2 December 1995	1
9 December 1995	9	"Earth Song" (#6)	Michael Jackson	1	9 December 1995	6
9 December 1995	2	"One Sweet Day"	Mariah Carey & Boyz II Men	6	9 December 1995	1
9 December 1995	1	"Disco 2000"	Pulp	7	9 December 1995	1
9 December 1995	1	"Gold"	Prince	10	9 December 1995	1
16 December 1995	3	"Free as a Bird"	The Beatles	2	16 December 1995	1
16 December 1995	1	"The Best Things In Life Are Free (1995 Remixes)"	Luther Vandross & Janet Jackson	7	16 December 1995	1
16 December 1995	2	"The Gift of Christmas" ^{[R]}	Childliners	9	16 December 1995	2
23 December 1995	1	"A Winter's Tale"	Queen	6	23 December 1995	1
30 December 1995	2	"Wonderwall"	The Mike Flowers Pops	2	30 December 1995	1
30 December 1995	3	"I Am Blessed" ♦	Eternal ^{[O]}	7	13 January 1996	1

== Entries by artist ==
The following table shows artists who achieved two or more top 10 entries in 1995, including songs that reached their peak in 1994 or 1996. The figures include both main artists and featured artists, while appearances on ensemble charity records are also counted for each artist.

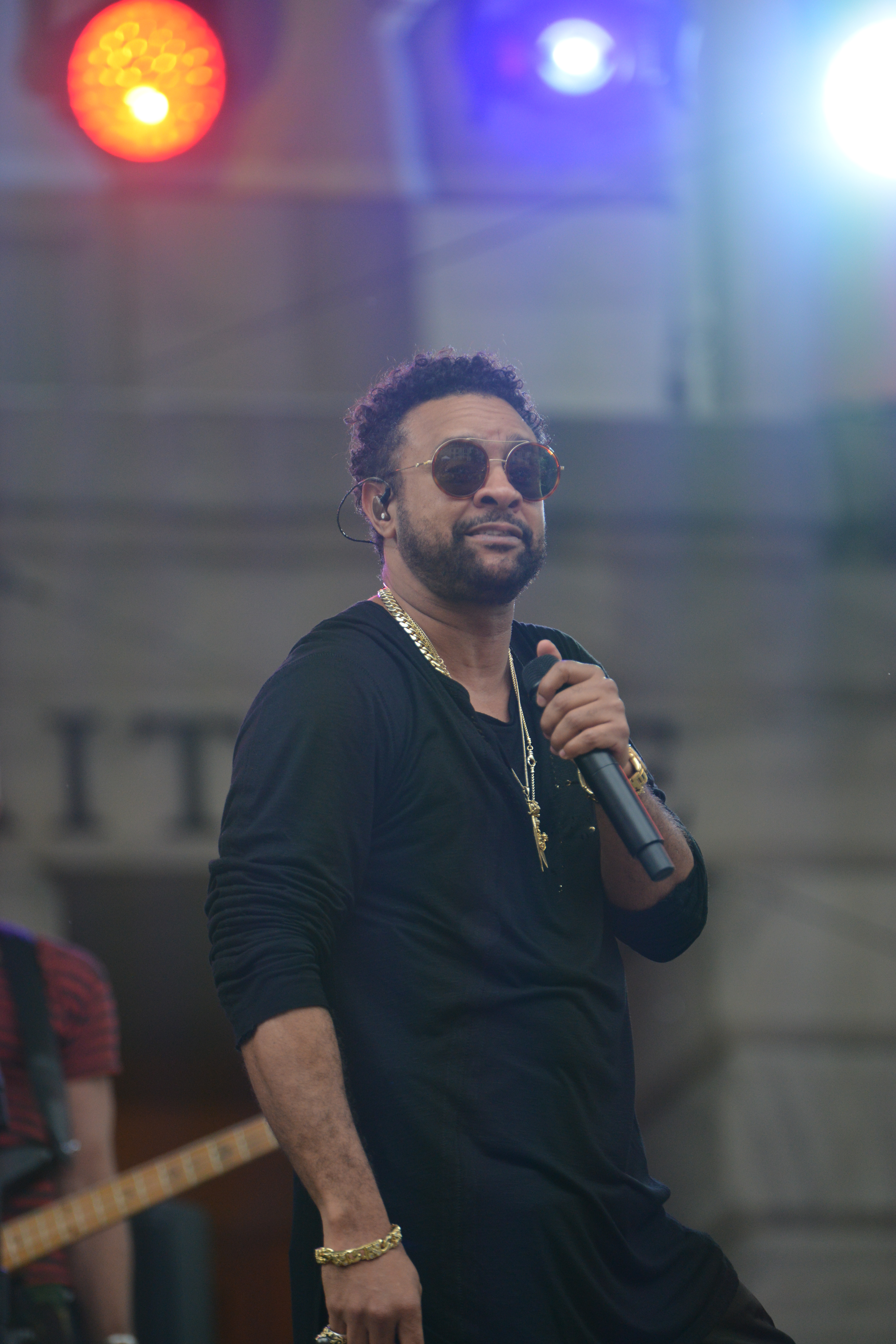
Shaggy (pictured in 2018) achieved two entries in the UK top 10 this year, including "Boombastic", which reached number-one for one week in September.

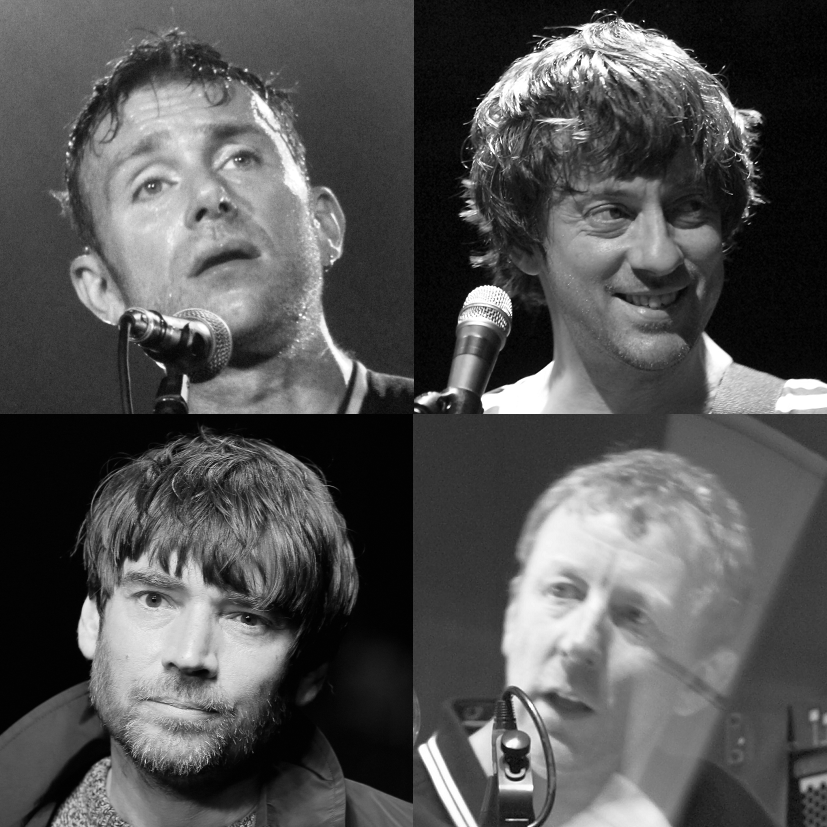
Blur scored two top 10 hits in 1995, including the number-one hit "Country House", which famously kept Oasis' "Roll with It" off the top spot in what became known as "The Battle of Britpop".

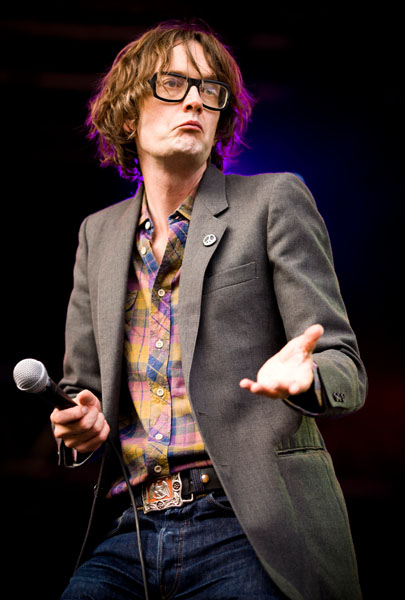
Jarvis Cocker (pictured in 2007) and his band Pulp had three top 10 entries this year, including "Common People" and "Mis-Shapes"/"Sorted for E's & Wizz", which both peaked at number two, becoming the group's joint highest-charting singles.

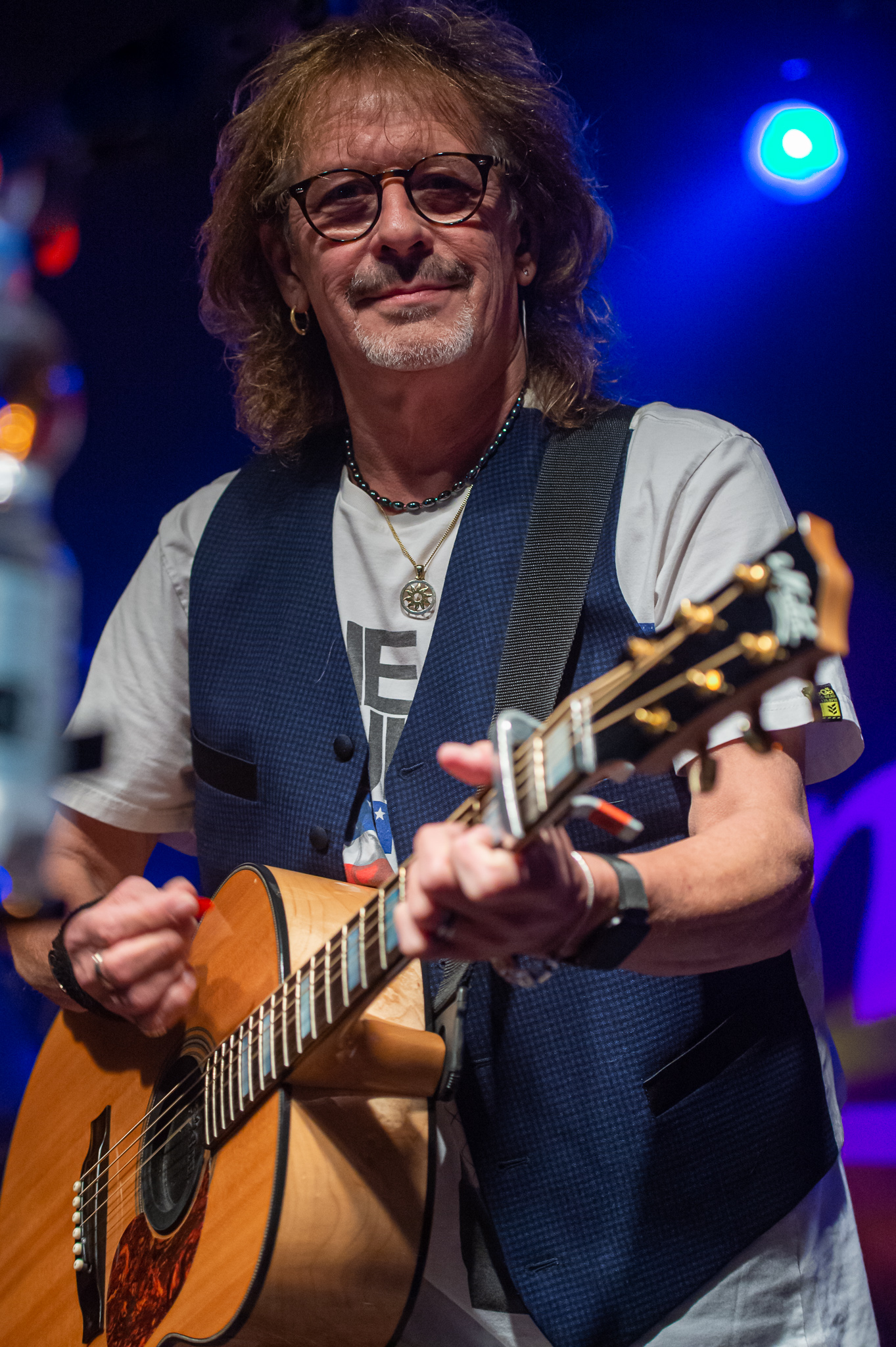
Smokie (band member Mike Craft pictured in 2018) teamed up with comedian Roy Chubby Brown to record a cover version of the band's 1976 hit single "Living Next Door to Alice". This version, entitled "Living Next Door to Alice (Who the F**k is Alice?)", peaked at number three in the UK in October 1995, two places higher than the number five peak of the original version nineteen years earlier.

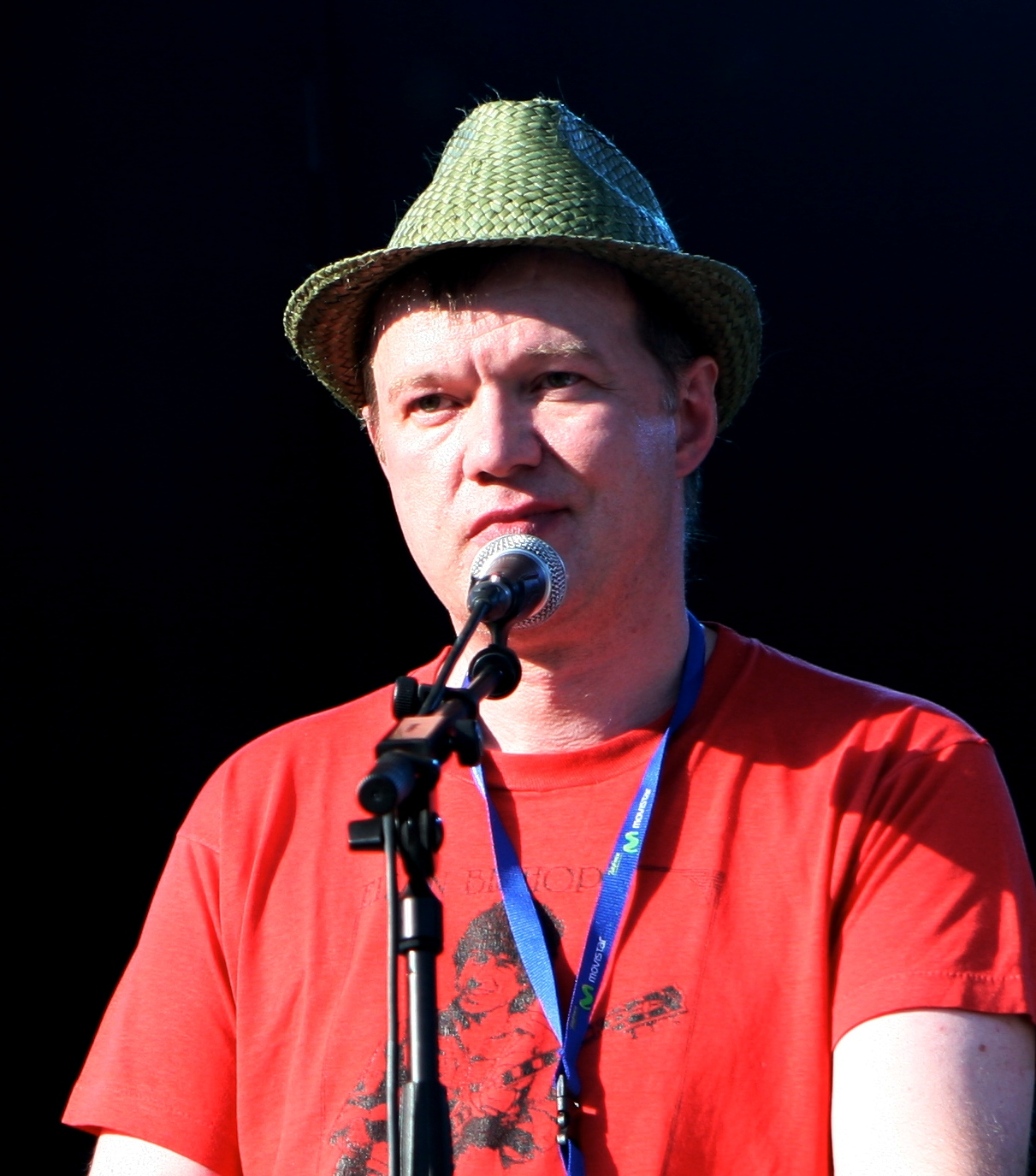
Scottish singer-songwriter Edwyn Collins who first found success as the lead singer with the band Orange Juice, achieved his biggest hit as a solo artist in 1995 with "A Girl Like You", which lasted seven weeks top 10, with its highest chart position at number four.

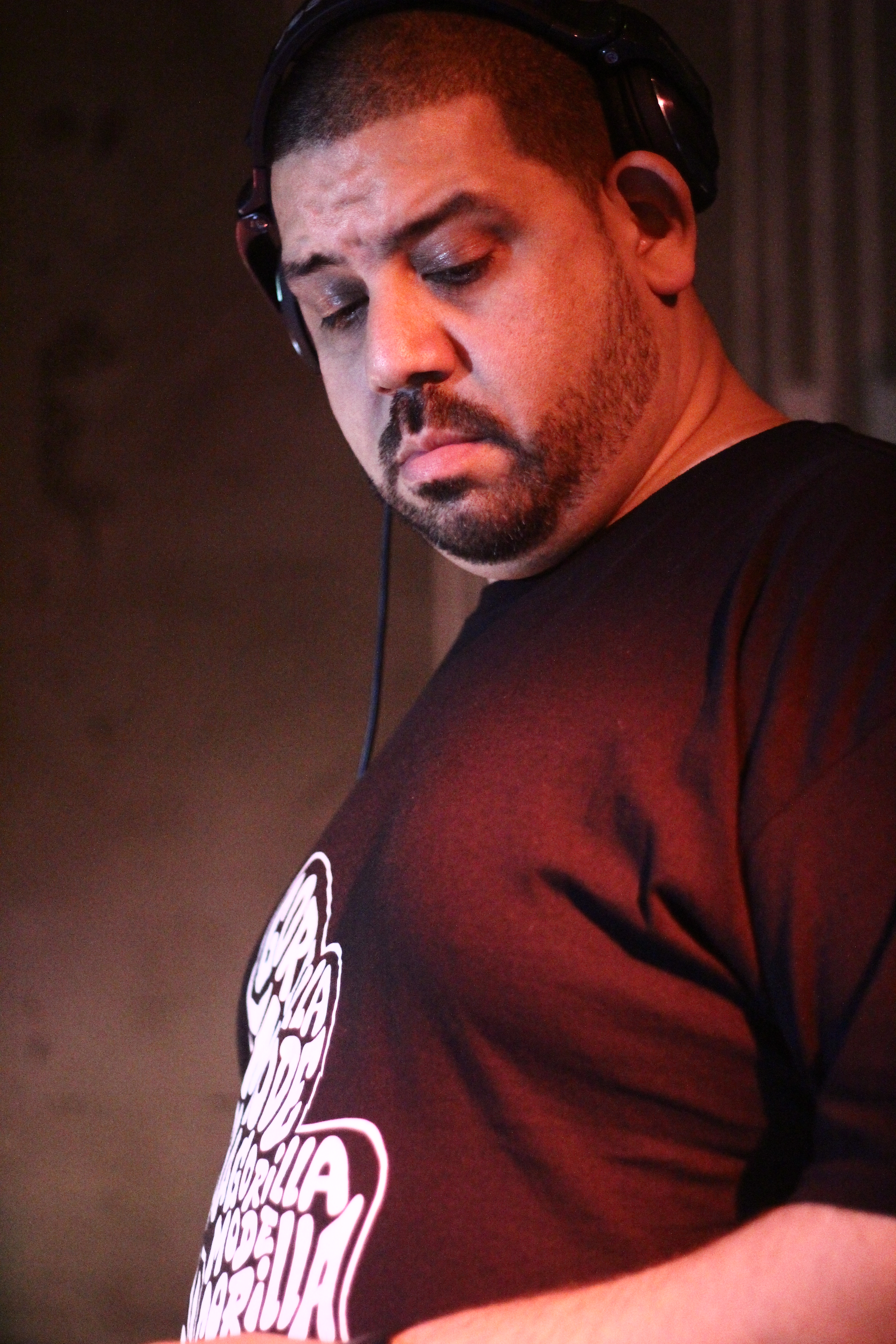
US disc jockey and record producer Kenny "Dope" Gonzalez reached number five in the UK in March of this year under the pseudonym "The Bucketheads" with the hit record "The Bomb! (These Sounds Fall into My Mind)".

Entries	Artist	Weeks	Singles
5	Keith Duffy ^{[S]}^{[T]}^{[U]}	17	"Father and Son", "Key to My Life", "Love Me for a Reason", "So Good", "The Gift of Christmas"
5	Michael Graham ^{[S]}^{[T]}^{[U]}	17	"Father and Son", "Key to My Life", "Love Me for a Reason", "So Good", "The Gift of Christmas"
5	Ronan Keating ^{[S]}^{[T]}^{[U]}	17	"Father and Son", "Key to My Life", "Love Me for a Reason", "So Good", "The Gift of Christmas"
5	Shane Lynch ^{[S]}^{[T]}^{[U]}	17	"Father and Son", "Key to My Life", "Love Me for a Reason", "So Good", "The Gift of Christmas"
5	Stephen Gately ^{[S]}^{[T]}^{[U]}	17	"Father and Son", "Key to My Life", "Love Me for a Reason", "So Good", "The Gift of Christmas"
4	Bon Jovi	7	"Lie to Me", "Someday I'll Be Saturday Night", "Something for the Pain", "This Ain't a Love Song"
4	Boyzone ^{[S]}	15	"Father and Son", "Key to My Life", "Love Me for a Reason", "So Good"
4	Brian Harvey ^{[U]}^{[V]}^{[W]}	9	"Let It Rain", "Stay Another Day", "The Gift of Christmas", "Thunder"
4	Dee Tails ^{[U]}^{[X]}	12	"Happy", "If You Only Let Me In", "I've Got a Little Something for You", "The Gift of Christmas"
4	G-Man ^{[U]}^{[X]}	12	"Happy", "If You Only Let Me In", "I've Got a Little Something for You", "The Gift of Christmas"
4	Janet Jackson	9	"Runaway", "Scream", "The Best Things In Life Are Free (1995 Remixes)", "Whoops Now"/"What'll I Do"
4	John Hendy ^{[U]}^{[V]}	9	"Let It Rain", "Stay Another Day", "The Gift of Christmas", "Thunder"
4	KG ^{[U]}^{[X]}	12	"Happy", "If You Only Let Me In", "I've Got a Little Something for You", "The Gift of Christmas"
4	Kule T ^{[U]}^{[X]}	12	"Happy", "If You Only Let Me In", "I've Got a Little Something for You", "The Gift of Christmas"
4	Oasis ^{[V]}	18	"Roll with It", "Some Might Say", "Whatever", "Wonderwall"
4	Terry Coldwell ^{[U]}^{[V]}^{[W]}	9	"Let It Rain", "Stay Another Day", "The Gift of Christmas", "Thunder"
4	Tony Mortimer ^{[U]}^{[V]}^{[W]}	9	"Let It Rain", "Stay Another Day", "The Gift of Christmas", "Thunder"
3	Celine Dion ^{[S]}	15	"Only One Road", "Pour que tu m'aimes encore", "Think Twice"
3	Clock	8	"Axel F"/"Keep Pushin'", "Everybody", "Whoomp! (There It Is)"
3	East 17 ^{[V]}^{[W]}	7	"Let It Rain", "Stay Another Day", "Thunder"
3	Graham Wilson ^{[U]}^{[Y]}	8	"Push the Feeling On", "Surrender Your Love", "The Gift of Christmas"
3	Hugh Brankin ^{[U]}^{[Y]}	8	"Push the Feeling On", "Surrender Your Love", "The Gift of Christmas"
3	John Reid ^{[U]}^{[Y]}^{[Z]}	8	"Push the Feeling On", "Surrender Your Love", "The Gift of Christmas"
3	Madonna	6	"Bedtime Story", "Human Nature", "You'll See"
3	Mariah Carey ^{[V]}	8	"All I Want for Christmas Is You", "Fantasy", "One Sweet Day"
3	Michael Jackson	17	"Earth Song", "Scream", "You Are Not Alone"
3	MN8	10	"Happy", "If You Only Let Me In", "I've Got a Little Something for You"
3	The Outhere Brothers	20	"Boom Boom Boom", "Don't Stop (Wiggle Wiggle)", "La La La Hey Hey"
3	Pulp	8	"Common People", "Disco 2000", "Mis-Shapes"/"Sorted for E's & Wizz"
3	Ross Campbell ^{[U]}^{[Y]}	8	"Push the Feeling On", "Surrender Your Love", "The Gift of Christmas"
3	Wet Wet Wet	7	"Don't Want to Forgive Me Now", "Julia Says", "Somewhere Somehow"
2	Amanda Perkins ^{[U]}^{[AA]}	3	"I Need You", "The Gift of Christmas"
2	The Beatles	5	"Baby It's You", "Free as a Bird"
2	Björk	9	"Army of Me", "It's Oh So Quiet"
2	Black Grape	2	"In the Name of the Father", "Reverend Black Grape"
2	Blur	5	"Country House", "The Universal"
2	Bobby Brown	8	"Humpin' Around", "Two Can Play That Game"
2	Corona	9	"Baby Baby", "Try Me Out"
2	Craig Robert Young ^{[U]}^{[AA]}	3	"I Need You", "The Gift of Christmas"
2	Eternal ^{[BB]}	4	"I Am Blessed", "Power of a Woman"
2	Gianni Visnadi ^{[CC]}^{[DD]}	12	"Don't Give Me Your Life", "Dreamer"
2	Kelly O'Keefe ^{[U]}^{[AA]}	3	"I Need You", "The Gift of Christmas"
2	Lee Murray ^{[U]}^{[EE]}	3	"Best in Me", "The Gift of Christmas"
2	Lisa Armstrong ^{[U]}^{[AA]}	3	"I Need You", "The Gift of Christmas"
2	M People	2	"Open Your Heart", "Search for the Hero"
2	N-Trance	14	"Set You Free", "Stayin' Alive"
2	Nightcrawlers	6	"Push the Feeling On", "Surrender Your Love"
2	Paul Holmes ^{[U]}^{[AA]}	3	"I Need You", "The Gift of Christmas"
2	Paul Oakenfold ^{[FF]}^{[GG]}	8	"Not Over Yet", "Reach Up (Papa's Got a Brand New Pigbag)"
2	Paul Weller	2	"The Changingman", "You Do Something to Me"
2	Paolo Visnadi ^{[CC]}^{[DD]}	12	"Don't Give Me Your Life", "Dreamer"
2	Queen	4	"A Winter's Tale", "Heaven for Everyone"
2	Richie Wermerling ^{[U]}^{[EE]}	3	"Best in Me", "The Gift of Christmas"
2	Rob Jeffrey ^{[U]}^{[EE]}	3	"Best in Me", "The Gift of Christmas"
2	Robson & Jerome	18	"I Believe"/"Up on the Roof" "Unchained Melody"/"White Cliffs of Dover"
2	Scatman John	7	"Scatman (Ski-Ba-Bop-Ba-Dop-Bop)", "Scatman's World"
2	Shaggy	11	"Boombastic", "In the Summertime"
2	Supergrass	6	"Alright"/"Time", "Lenny"
2	Take That	12	"Back for Good", "Never Forget"
2	U2 ^{[HH]}	9	"Hold Me, Thrill Me, Kiss Me, Kill Me", "Miss Sarajevo"
2	Whigfield ^{[S]}	4	"Another Day", "Think of You"

== See also ==
- 1995 in British music
- List of number-one singles from the 1990s (UK)

== Notes ==
- ^{a} "Another Day" re-entered the top 10 at number 7 on 7 January 1995 (week ending).
- ^{b} "Riverdance" was performed during the interval of the Eurovision Song Contest in 1994, with Michael Flatley and Jean Butler dancing. It was expanded into a stage musical beginning in Dublin in February 1995.
- ^{c} Perfecto Allstarz was a pseudonym used by the DJ and producer Paul Oakenfold.
- ^{d} "The Bomb! (These Sounds Fall into My Mind)" re-entered the top 10 at number 10 on 15 April 1995 (week ending).
- ^{e} The Bucketheads was a pseudonym used by American DJ Kenny "Dope" Gonzalez.
- ^{f} "Turn On, Tune In, Cop Out" originally peaked outside the top ten at number 29 in 1993.
- ^{g} Released as the official single for Comic Relief.
- ^{h} "We're Gonna Do It Again" was released by Manchester United F.C. to celebrate reaching the FA Cup Final in 1995.
- ^{i} "Love City Groove" was the United Kingdom's entry at the Eurovision Song Contest in 1995.
- ^{j} A remixed version of "Scream" on its own was released in the United Kingdom, while it was released elsewhere as a double A-side single with "Childhood".
- ^{k} The original version of "Don't You Want Me" peaked at number 6 upon its release in 1992.
- ^{l} "Son of a Gun" originally peaked outside the top ten at number 13 upon its initial release in March 1994.
- ^{m} "I'll be There for You" re-entered the top 10 at number 10 on 14 October 1995 (week ending). The song was used as the theme song for the American television series Friends.
- ^{n} The original version of "I Feel Love" peaked at number-one upon its initial release in 1977. A remix of the song by Patrick Cowley was released in 1983 and peaked at number 21 in the UK chart.
- ^{o} Louise Nurding (known professionally as Louise) left the group Eternal to start a solo career in 1995 and does not appear on either of their top 10 hits this year.
- ^{p} "Wonderwall" re-entered the top 10 at number 9 on 23 December 1995 (week ending) for 6 weeks.
- ^{q} Passengers was a pseudonym used by U2 for the Original Soundtracks 1 album project from which "Miss Sarajevo" was taken.
- ^{r} "The Gift of Christmas" was a charity single released by the collective Childliners to raise money for Childline.
- ^{s} Figure includes single that first charted in 1994 but peaked in 1995.
- ^{t} Figure includes four top 10 hits with the group Boyzone.
- ^{u} Figure includes an appearance on the Childliners charity record "The Gift of Christmas".
- ^{v} Figure includes single that peaked in 1994.
- ^{w} Figure includes three top 10 hits with the group East 17.
- ^{x} Figure includes three top 10 hits with the group MN8.
- ^{y} Figure includes two top 10 hits with the group Nightcrawlers.
- ^{z} John Reid received a featured credit for his band Nightcrawlers single "Surrender Your Love".
- ^{aa} Figure includes a top 10 hit with the group Deuce.
- ^{bb} Figure includes single that peaked in 1996.
- ^{cc} Figure includes a top 10 hit with the group Alex Party.
- ^{dd} Figure includes a top 10 hit with the group Livin' Joy.
- ^{ee} Figure includes a top 10 hit with the group Let Loose.
- ^{ff} Figure includes a top 10 hit with the group Grace.
- ^{gg} Figure includes a single under the pseudonym Perfecto Allstarz.
- ^{hh} Figure includes a single under the pseudonym Passengers.
