= List of number-one singles of 1995 (Ireland) =

The following is a list of the IRMA's number-one singles of 1995.

Dates given are the Saturday of publication.

Issue date	Song	Artist	Ref.
6 January	"Love Me for a Reason"	Boyzone	
13 January	"Love Me for a Reason"	Boyzone	
20 January	"Think Twice"	Celine Dion	
27 January	"Think Twice"	Celine Dion	
3 February	"Think Twice"	Celine Dion	
10 February	"Think Twice"	Celine Dion	
17 February	"Think Twice"	Celine Dion	
24 February	"Think Twice"	Celine Dion	
3 March	"Think Twice"	Celine Dion	
10 March	"Think Twice"	Celine Dion	
17 March	"Think Twice"	Celine Dion	
24 March	"Don't Stop (Wiggle Wiggle)"	The Outhere Brothers	
31 March	"Back for Good"	Take That	
7 April	"Back for Good"	Take That	
14 April	"Back for Good"	Take That	
21 April	"Key to My Life"	Boyzone	
28 April	"Key to My Life"	Boyzone	
5 May	"Key to My Life"	Boyzone	
12 May	"Key to My Life"	Boyzone	
19 May	"Key to My Life"	Boyzone	
26 May	"Scatman"	Scatman John	
2 June	"Scatman"	Scatman John	
9 June	"Hold Me, Thrill Me, Kiss Me, Kill Me"	U2	
16 June	"Hold Me, Thrill Me, Kiss Me, Kill Me"	U2	
23 June	"Hold Me, Thrill Me, Kiss Me, Kill Me"	U2	
30 June	"Boom Boom Boom"	The Outhere Brothers	
7 July	"Boom Boom Boom"	The Outhere Brothers	
14 July	"Boom Boom Boom"	The Outhere Brothers	
21 July	"Boom Boom Boom"	The Outhere Brothers	
28 July	"Never Forget"	Take That	
4 August	"So Good"	Boyzone	
11 August	"So Good"	Boyzone	
18 August	"Country House"	Blur	
25 August	"Country House"	Blur	
1 September	"Country House"	Blur	
8 September	"Country House"	Blur	
15 September	"Country House"	Blur	
22 September	"You Are Not Alone"	Michael Jackson	
29 September	"Boombastic"	Shaggy	
6 October	"Fairground"	Simply Red	
13 October	"Boombastic"	Shaggy	
20 October	"Boombastic"	Shaggy	
27 October	"When Love & Hate Collide"	Def Leppard	
3 November	"Gangsta's Paradise"	Coolio	
10 November	"Gangsta's Paradise"	Coolio	
17 November	"Gangsta's Paradise"	Coolio	
24 November	"Gangsta's Paradise"	Coolio	
1 December	"Father and Son"	Boyzone	
8 December	"Father and Son"	Boyzone	
15 December	"Father and Son"	Boyzone	
22 December	"Father and Son"	Boyzone	
29 December	"Father and Son"	Boyzone	

== See also ==
- 1995 in music
- List of artists who reached number one in Ireland
