= Tall Paul (DJ) =

- Also known as: Tall Paul, Camisra
- Born: 5 May 1971 (age 55)
- Origin: London, England
- Genres: House
- Years active: 1991–present (as Tall Paul); 1998–1999 (as Camisra)
- Labels: VC Recordings, Virgin
- Website: www.djtallpaul.com

Paul Newman (born 5 May 1971), also known as Tall Paul or Camisra, is an English DJ, producer and remixer who is best known for remixing INXS' "Never Tear Us Apart" as "Precious Heart", as well as the tracks "Rock da House" and "Let Me Show You".

== Tall Paul ==
Tall Paul began his DJing career in 1985 at Turnmills, a nightclub his father owned. From there, he became the resident DJ at the Gardening nightclub, Zap Club in Brighton and Trade in London, before headlining at various events in countries including the US, Brazil and Ibiza.

In 2001, Tall Paul released an album of mainstream-oriented music, Mixed Live Tall Paul.

== Camisra ==
Before producing as Camisra in 1998, Tall Paul created his first white label album entitled Love Rush in 1992. Hooj Choons record label controller Red Jerry subsequently remixed the album. In 1998, Paul's Camisra entered the mainstream charts with the top-five hit "Let Me Show You". Minor hits followed as Camisra before Paul went on to work with other projects.

== Remixer ==
Tall Paul has also remixed songs for many artists, such as the Original's "I Luv U Baby", Liquid's "Sweet Harmony", the Stone Roses' "Fools Gold '95", Kool World Productions' "In-vader" and Mary Kiani's "100%".

== Discography ==
=== Singles as Tall Paul ===
- "Rock da House" (1997) - UK No. 12
- "Be There" (1999) - UK No. 45
- "Freebase" (2000) - UK No. 43
- "Precious Heart" (2001) - UK No. 14
- "Everybody's a Rockstar" (2002) - UK No. 60
- "Got It" (2005)

=== Singles as Camisra ===
| Year | Single | Peak chart positions | | | | |
| Year | Single | UK | AUS | FRA | IRE | NED |
|---|---|---|---|---|---|---|
| 1998 | "Let Me Show You" | 5 | 95 | 98 | 19 | 53 |
| 1998 | "Feel the Beat" | 32 | — | — | 30 | — |
| 1999 | "Clap Your Hands" | 34 | — | — | — | — |
