= Coming Home Now =

1996 single by Boyzone

Single by Boyzone

from the album Said and Done
- B-side: "Close to You"
- Released: 26 February 1996
- Length: 3:41
- Label: Polydor
- Songwriters: Keith Duffy; Mikey Graham; Ronan Keating; Shane Lynch; Stephen Gately
- Producer: Ray Hedges

Boyzone singles chronology
"Father and Son" (1995)	"Coming Home Now" (1996)	"Words" (1996)

Music video
- "Coming Home Now" on YouTube

"Coming Home Now" is the sixth single taken from Irish boy band Boyzone's debut album, Said and Done (1995). It was their only single to be written solely by the group, without any outside co-writers. Released in February 1996 by Polydor, it peaked at number four on the UK Singles Chart, becoming Boyzone's only solo single to miss the top three prior to their initial split in 2000. The song has received a silver sales certification for shipping 200,000 units in the UK. In Ireland, the song broke their consecutive string of four number-one hits by reaching number two.

== Critical reception ==
Music Week gave 'Coming Home Now' four out of five, writing, "Boyzone should clinch a fifth consecutive top three hit with this sweet, self-penned ballad that has all the ingredients which have made the band so big, plus luscious strings arranged by Anne Dudley." Mark Beaumont from NME described it as a "toe-dip into East 17's smouldering bucket of raunch". Smash Hits gave it three out of five, naming it "a slow, smoochy song reminiscent of PJ & Duncan's 'Eternal Love'."

== Track listings ==
- UK CD single
1. "Coming Home Now" (radio edit) – 3:41
2. "Close to You" – 3:47
3. "Coming Home Now" (Steve Jervier mix) – 3:55
- UK and European CD single (digipak)
1. "Coming Home Now" (radio edit) – 3:41
2. "Close to You" – 3:47
3. "Coming Home Now" (Steve Jervier mix) – 3:55
4. "Coming Home Now" (Missing Link mix) – 5:51
- Japanese maxi-CD single
1. "Coming Home Now" (radio edit)
2. "Love Me for a Reason"
3. "Father and Son"
4. "Key to My Life"
5. "Working My Way Back to You"

== Charts ==
=== Weekly charts ===
Chart (1996)	Peak position
Europe (Eurochart Hot 100)	23
Ireland (IRMA)	2
Israel (IBA)	8
Netherlands (Dutch Top 40 Tipparade)	11
Netherlands (Single Top 100 Tipparade)	3
Scottish Singles Sales (Official Charts)	4
UK Singles (Official Charts)	4
UK Airplay (Music Week)	6

=== Year-end charts ===
Chart (1996)	Position
UK Singles (OCC)	67

== Certifications ==
Region	Certification	Certified units/sales
United Kingdom (BPI)	Silver	200,000^{^}
^{^} Shipments figures based on certification alone.

== Release history ==
Region	Date	Format(s)	Label(s)	Ref.
United Kingdom	26 February 1996	CD; cassette	Polydor	
Japan	1 April 1996	CD	Polydor	
