= Some Girls (disambiguation) =

Some Girls is a 1978 album by the Rolling Stones.

Some Girls may also refer to:

== Music ==
=== Rolling Stones' music ===
- "Some Girls" (Rolling Stones song), 1978
- Some Girls: Live in Texas '78, a live concert film and album by the Rolling Stones

=== Songs ===
- "Some Girls" (Belouis Some song), 1988
- "Some Girls" (Jameson Rodgers song), 2020
- "Some Girls" (Racey song), 1979
- "Some Girls" (Rachel Stevens song), 2004
- "Some Girls" (Ultimate Kaos song), 1994
- "Some Girls (Dance with Women)", by JC Chasez, 2003
- "Some Girls", by Bananarama from Wow!, 1987
- "Some Girls", by Madonna from MDNA, 2012

=== Performers ===
- Some Girls (band), an American indie rock band formed in 2001
- Some Girls (California band), a 2002–2007 hardcore punk band

== Other uses ==
- Some Girls (film), a 1988 American coming-of-age film
- Some Girl(s), a 2006 play by Neil LaBute
  - Some Girl(s) (film), a 2013 adaptation of the play
- Some Girls (TV series), a 2012–2014 British sitcom
- Some Girls: My Life in a Harem, a 2010 book by Jillian Lauren

== See also ==
- Some Girl, a 1998 American film
- Some Girls Do (disambiguation)
