= Everett Bradley (musician) =

American musician

- Born: March 16, 1963 (age 63); Greenwood, South Carolina, U.S.
- Genres: Rock; electronic
- Occupation: Musician
- Instruments: Percussion; guitar; vocals
- Years active: 1997–present
- Member of: Bon Jovi
- Formerly of: The Original
- Website: everettbradley.com

Everett Bradley (born March 16, 1963) is an American singer and musician who is a member of the rock band Bon Jovi.

== Biography ==
Born in South Carolina, he then moved to Muncie, Indiana where he was the drum major at Northside High school as well as the lead in several musicals. Bradley attended Indiana University on a vocal scholarship. He first came to the East Coast to play with John Eddie. He has toured as a background vocalist and percussionist with Bruce Springsteen and the E Street Band, Bon Jovi, and Hall & Oates. His theatre credits include being part of the creative team of Swing! (Theatre World Award 2000), being the first American to perform with and direct Stomp, for which he was nominated for a Grammy, and performing in the Cotton Club musical revue After Midnight. He has served as musical director for Carly Simon and NBC's The Meredith Vieira Show, for which he also wrote the show's theme song and other music included in the program. He has recorded with GRP Records' Dee Carstensen, Joey Ramone, Polygram act Jane Williams, Verve's Chris Botti and Cyndi Lauper.

Bradley performed vocals on the 1995 hit single from the Original, "I Luv U Baby".

Starting in 2002, he began putting on his own funk-influenced holiday production, Holidelic, which has seen guests such as Fred Schneider, Vernon Reid, John Forté, Elmo Shropshire and Celeste Holm.

Everett has also worked and performed as a percussionist and backing vocalist for Jon Bon Jovi on his 1997 “Destination Anywhere” tour as well played with American rock band Bon Jovi in 2003 during This Left Feels Right Live session, and he became the touring percussionist for Bon Jovi in 2016 to support the band's This House Is Not for Sale Tour. He became an official member in 2020.

In video games, he provided the voice of Paul Chuck in Um Jammer Lammy, as well as his vocals to the songs "Throw It All Away", "Rhythm and Balance", "The Supernatural", "For True Story" and "Supporting Me" for the character Shadow the Hedgehog in Sonic Adventure 2.
