= Said and Done =

Studio album by Boyzone
- Released: 21 August 1995
- Recorded: 1993–1994
- Genre: Pop
- Length: 45:20
- Label: Polydor
- Producer: Ray Hedges

Boyzone chronology
Said and Done (1995)	A Different Beat (1996)

Singles from Said and Done
- 1. "Working My Way Back to You" Released: 14 May 1994 (Ireland only); 2. "Love Me for a Reason" Released: 28 November 1994; 3. "Key to My Life" Released: 17 April 1995; 4. "So Good" Released: 31 July 1995; 5. "Father and Son" Released: 13 November 1995; 6. "Coming Home Now" Released: 26 February 1996

Professional ratings
Review scores
Source	Rating
AllMusic	4/5 stars
The Guardian	1/5 stars
NME	2/10

Said and Done is the debut album by Irish boy band Boyzone. The album was released on 21 August 1995 by Polydor Records and went straight to No. 1 on the UK Albums Chart. The album sold 1.2 million copies in the first year of its release. As of December 1997, the album had sold 2.2 million copies worldwide.

== Overview ==
Said and Done was released officially in Ireland and the UK on 21 August 1995 by Polydor Records. The album topped the UK Albums Chart right upon its release and went on to spend 58 weeks in Top 75. It was certified as 3× Platinum in the UK.

Five official singles were released from the album, all of which were Top 5 hits in the UK: "Love Me for a Reason", "Key to My Life", "So Good", "Father and Son" and "Coming Home Now". "Believe in Me" was also issued as a single, exclusively in Japan. It was released as an alternative to "Father and Son" in the country.

The first Irish pressing of the album, of which only around 10,000 copies exist, contains the group's debut single, "Working My Way Back to You", in place of "Father and Son", which was featured as a B-side to "Love Me for a Reason" instead. This version was available on 4 August 1995, as an exclusive to the Irish retail chain Foley's. All later pressings contain the final track listing.

Some Japanese editions of the album were packaged in a special slipcase with a bonus photo booklet.

== Track listing ==
Standard edition
No.	Title	Writer(s)	Lead vocals	Length
1.	"Together"	Ronan Keating, Ray Hedges, Martin Brannigan	Keating	3:41
2.	"Coming Home Now"	Keith Duffy, Stephen Gately, Mikey Graham, Keating, Shane Lynch	Lynch; Duffy; Keating; Gately	3:47
3.	"Love Me for a Reason"	Johnny Bristol, Wade Brown, David Jones, Jr.	Keating; Gately	3:39
4.	"Oh Carol"	Des Dyer, Clive Scott, Hedges	Keating; Gately	3:35
5.	"When All Is Said and Done"	Gately, Keating, Graham, Duffy, Lynch, Hedges, Brannigan	Lynch; Graham; Keating; Duffy; Gately	3:05
6.	"So Good"	Gately, Keating, Graham, Duffy, Lynch, Hedges, Brannigan	Keating	3:04
7.	"Can't Stop Me"	Gately, Hedges, Brannigan	Gately	3:08
8.	"I'll Be There"	Tony Jackson, Jeffrey Sayadian, Hedges, Brannigan	Keating; Gately	3:42
9.	"Key to My Life"	Gately, Keating, Graham, Hedges, Brannigan	Gately; Keating	3:45
10.	"If You Were Mine"	Joey Balin, Andy Hill	Gately	4:30
11.	"Arms of Mary"	Iain Sutherland	Keating	2:48
12.	"Believe in Me"	Gately, Keating, Mark Taylor, Paul Holgate, Hedges, Brannigan	Keating; Gately	3:46
13.	"Father and Son"	Cat Stevens	Keating	2:50

Irish first pressing
No.	Title	Writer(s)	Lead vocals	Length
1.	"Together"	Ronan Keating, Ray Hedges, Martin Brannigan	Keating	3:41
2.	"Coming Home Now"	Keith Duffy, Stephen Gately, Mikey Graham, Keating, Shane Lynch, Hedges, Brannigan	Lynch; Duffy; Keating; Gately	3:47
3.	"Love Me for a Reason"	Johnny Bristol, Wade Brown, David Jones	Keating; Gately	3:39
4.	"Oh Carol"	Des Dyer, Clive Scott, Hedges	Keating; Gately	3:35
5.	"When All Is Said and Done"	Gately, Keating, Graham, Duffy, Lynch, Hedges, Brannigan	Lynch; Graham; Keating; Duffy; Gately	3:05
6.	"So Good"	Gately, Keating, Graham, Duffy, Lynch, Hedges, Brannigan	Keating	3:04
7.	"Can't Stop Me"	Gately, Hedges, Brannigan	Gately	3:08
8.	"I'll Be There"	Tony Jackson, Jeffrey Sayadian, Hedges, Brannigan	Keating; Gately	3:42
9.	"Key to My Life"	Gately, Keating, Graham, Hedges, Brannigan	Gately; Keating	3:45
10.	"If You Were Mine"	Andy Hill	Gately	4:30
11.	"Arms of Mary"	Iain Sutherland	Keating	2:48
12.	"Believe in Me"	Gately, Keating, Mark Taylor, Paul Holgate, Hedges, Brannigan	Keating; Gately	3:46
13.	"Working My Way Back to You"	Sandy Linzer, Denny Randell	Gately; Graham	4:12

Japanese bonus track
No.	Title	Writer(s)	Lead vocals	Length
14.	"Here to Eternity"	Gately, Keating, Graham, Hedges, Brannigan	Keating; Graham; Gately	3:33

== Charts ==
=== Weekly charts ===
Chart (1995–1996)	Peak position
Australian Albums (ARIA)	49
Belgian Albums (Ultratop Flanders)	10
Belgian Albums (Ultratop Wallonia)	42
Dutch Albums (Album Top 100)	41
European Albums Chart	13
French Albums (SNEP)	33
German Albums (Offizielle Top 100)	68
Greek Albums (IFPI Greece)	14
Irish Albums (IRMA)	1
Scottish Albums (Official Charts)	5
Singapore Albums (SPVA)	7
Swiss Albums (Schweizer Hitparade)	44
UK Albums (Official Charts)	1

=== Year-end charts ===
Chart (1995)	Position
UK Albums (OCC)	23
Chart (1996)	Position
European Albums (Eurochart Hot 100)	90
UK Albums (OCC)	38

== Certifications and sales ==
Region	Certification	Certified units/sales
Thailand (IFPI)	—	200,000
United Kingdom (BPI)	3× Platinum	900,000^{^}
Summaries
Europe (IFPI)	Platinum	1,000,000^{*}
^{*} Sales figures based on certification alone.^{^} Shipments figures based on certification alone.
