= Some Girls Do (disambiguation) =

Some Girls Do is a 1969 British comedy spy film directed by Ralph Thomas.

Some Girls Do may also refer to:

== Music ==
- Some Girls Do (album), 1991 album by Lee Aaron
- "Some Girls Do" (song), 1992 song by Sawyer Brown

== Literature ==
- Some Girls Do ... My Life as a Teenager, a 2007 anthology of Australian female writers edited by Jacinta Tynan
- Some Girls Do, a 2003 novel in the Sisters trilogy by Leanne Banks

== See also ==
- Some Girls (disambiguation)
