= Walter Taieb =

French record producer (born 1973)

Walter Taieb (born February 13, 1973, in Paris, France) is a French record producer, songwriter, composer and conductor.

== Career ==
In the mid-1990s, Taieb was a member of the house music group the Original, which scored a hit single in 1995 with "I Luv U Baby".

Taieb is the composer of The Alchemist's Symphony with Juilliard professor Philip Lasser (1997). He studied conducting with Rolf Reuter in Berlin.
