= Hoochie Booty =

1995 single by Ultimate Kaos

Single by Ultimate Kaos

from the album Ultimate Kaos
- Released: 9 January 1995
- Length: 3:51
- Label: Wildcard
- Songwriter(s): Ricky Rainbow
- Producer(s): Michael Barnes, Ricky Rainbow

Ultimate Kaos singles chronology
"Some Girls" (1994)	"Hoochie Booty" (1995)	"Show a Little Love" (1995)

"Hoochie Booty" is a song by British boy band Ultimate Kaos from their eponymous debut album. The song was released as the second single from the album and was a top-20 hit, peaking at No. 17 on the UK Singles Chart and No. 6 on the UK R&B Singles Chart in January 1995. In Ireland, the song reached No. 13.

== Charts ==
Chart (1995)	Peak position
Europe (Eurochart Hot 100)	49
Ireland (IRMA)	13
Scotland (OCC)	29
UK Singles (OCC)	17
UK Hip Hop/R&B (OCC)	6
