= List of RPM number-one alternative rock singles of 1995 =

This is a list of the number one weekly Alternative Rock Singles chart in Canada for 1995. This chart was first published 11 June 1995 (Note: The first entry Rock/Alternative - Volume 20, No. 20, 10 November 1973 is a catalogue error, further evidenced by the LW (last week) statistic "New".) as the RPM Alternative 30 by RPM magazine. (Note: The magazine's weekly record charts were digitized by the AV Trust. This collection of the Alternative Singles chart is archived by Library and Archives Canada here. You must view each entry on the chart for a match, when not searching by position number. The PDF text search does not work unless you have DjVu software plug-in installed on your computer.) In early 1999, the magazine renamed the chart to "Rock Report". (Note: The first available chart for 1999 is Rock/Alternative - Volume 68, No. 25, 12 April 1999.) This chart was published most weeks (Note: The last entry for this chart is Volume 62, No. 20. The first chart for 1996 is number 21.) until the magazine's demise 13 November 2000.

== Weekly chart ==
Date	Issue	TW	LW	WO	Artist	Single	Ref.
11 June	Volume 61, No. 19	1	New	-	White Zombie	"More Human than Human"	
19 June	Volume 61, No. 20	1	5	2	Soul Asylum	"Misery"	
26 June	Volume 61, No. 21	1	1	3	Soul Asylum	"Misery"	
3 July	Volume 61, No. 22	1	1	4	Soul Asylum	"Misery"	
10 July	Volume 61, No. 23	1	2	3	U2	"Hold Me, Thrill Me, Kiss Me, Kill Me"	
17 July	Volume 61, No. 24	1	1	4	U2	"Hold Me, Thrill Me, Kiss Me, Kill Me"	
24 July	Volume 61, No. 25	1	1	4	Foo Fighters	"This Is a Call"	
31 July	Volume 61, No. 26	1	1	5	Foo Fighters	"This Is a Call"	
7 August	Volume 61, No. 27	1	1	6	Foo Fighters	"This Is a Call"	
14 August	Volume 62, No. 1	1	1	7	Foo Fighters	"This Is a Call"	
21 August	Volume 62, No. 3	1	2	7	Silverchair	"Tomorrow"	
28 August	Volume 62, No. 4	1	1	8	Silverchair	"Tomorrow"	
4 September	Volume 62, No. 5	1	1	9	Silverchair	"Tomorrow"	
11 September	Volume 62, No. 6	1	2	5	Green Day	"J.A.R."	
18 September	Volume 62, No. 7	1	2	7	Bush X	"Comedown"	
25 September	Volume 62, No. 8	1	1	8	Bush X	"Comedown"	
2 October	Volume 62, No. 9	1	6	5	The Presidents of the United States of America	"Lump"	
9 October	Volume 62, No. 10	1	2	6	Goo Goo Dolls	"Name"	
16 October	Volume 62, No. 11	1	9	3	Green Day	"Geek Stink Breath"	
23 October	Volume 62, No. 12	1	1	4	Green Day	"Geek Stink Breath"	
30 October	Volume 62, No. 13	1	1	5	Green Day	"Geek Stink Breath"	
6 November	Volume 62, No. 14	1	1	4	The Smashing Pumpkins	"Bullet with Butterfly Wings"	
13 November	Volume 62, No. 15	1	1	5	The Smashing Pumpkins	"Bullet with Butterfly Wings"	
20 November	Volume 62, No. 16	1	1	6	The Smashing Pumpkins	"Bullet with Butterfly Wings"	
27 November	Volume 62, No. 17	1	1	7	The Smashing Pumpkins	"Bullet with Butterfly Wings"	
4 December	Volume 62, No. 18	1	1	11	Red Hot Chili Peppers	"My Friends"	
11 December	Volume 62, No. 19	1	1	2	Red Hot Chili Peppers	"My Friends"	
18 December	Volume 62, No. 20	1	1	13	Red Hot Chili Peppers	"My Friends"	
18 December	Volume 62, No. 20	-	-	-	The Smashing Pumpkins	"Bullet with Butterfly Wings"	

== See also ==
- Canadian rock
