= The Gift of Christmas (song) =

1995 song by Childliners

Single by Childliners
- B-side: "Accapella"
- Released: 4 December 1995
- Genre: Pop
- Length: 4:06
- Label: London Records
- Songwriter: Tony Mortimer
- Producers: Rob Kean; Tony Vickers

Music video
- "The Gift of Christmas" on YouTube

"The Gift of Christmas" is a 1995 charity single by supergroup Childliners, with the proceeds of the single going to Childline. The song was written by Tony Mortimer of East 17 and released by London Records. In a similar ilk to "Do They Know It's Christmas?" by Band Aid, the song features popular chart acts such as MN8, Boyzone, East 17, Backstreet Boys, Dannii Minogue, Peter Andre and more. It peaked at number nine on the UK Singles Chart, number ten in Ireland and number seven in Scotland.

A second CD of "The Gift of Christmas" was also released featuring remixes by Motiv 8, Not Loveland, Matt Darey, Beatmasters and Wand; whilst credited to 'ChildLiner DJs', the artist remains ChildLiners, and the DJs have only remixed the existing track.

== Performers ==
- A.S.A.P.
- Backstreet Boys
- Boyzone
- C. J. Lewis
- China Black
- Dannii Minogue
- Deuce
- East 17
- E.Y.C.
- Gemini
- Michelle Gayle
- MN8
- Nightcrawlers
- Peter Andre
- Sean Maguire
- The Flood
- Ultimate Kaos
- West End

== Track listings ==
- CD single
1. "The Gift of Christmas" (Radio Mix) – 4:06
2. "The Gift of Christmas" (Accapella) – 3:56
- CD single (remix)
1. "The Gift of Christmas" (Single Version) – 4:06
2. "The Gift of Christmas" (Motiv 8 Simply Great) – 5:45
3. "The Gift of Christmas" (Not Loveland But Lapland Mix) – 7:09
4. "The Gift of Christmas" (Gift Rapped) – 5:32
5. "The Gift of Christmas" (Frankincense Making Sense Mix) – 6:30
6. "The Gift of Christmas" (Wands Magic Mix) – 5:53
- Cassette single
1. "The Gift of Christmas" (Radio Mix) – 4:06
2. "The Gift of Christmas" (Accapella) – 3:56

== Charts ==
=== Weekly charts ===
Chart (1995)	Peak position
Europe (Eurochart Hot 100)	32
Ireland (IRMA)	10
Israel (IBA)	28
Scotland (OCC)	7
UK Singles (OCC)	9
UK Club Chart (Music Week)	60

=== Year-end charts ===
Chart (1995)	Position
UK Singles (OCC)	75
