= Ultimate Kaos =

1990s British boyband

- Origin: London, England
- Genres: Pop, R&B
- Years active: 1992–1999
- Label: Sony Music (1992–1996)
- Past members: Haydon Eshun; Ryan Elliott; Jomo Baxter; Nick Grant; Jayde Spence; Shaun Barker; Dwain

Ultimate Kaos (stylised as Ultimate KAOS) were a British boyband from the 1990s, who were formed by Simon Cowell. Its original members comprised Jomo Baxter, Jayde Spence, Ryan Elliott, Nick Grant and the then 9 years old Haydon Eshun.

== Career ==
In 1992, the band were originally known as Chaos, but their only single issued under this name was a cover version of the Michael Jackson song "Farewell My Summer Love". Before they released the single, they were Sinitta's backing dancers, as Sinitta at the time, was dating Cowell. Haydon Eshun had previously appeared on Michael Barrymore's TV programme showcasing British talent.

Ultimate Kaos found success early on with hits such as "Some Girls", following their support to Take That on their 1994 UK tour. The Ultimate Kaos fanbase spread into Europe and brought them hits in Germany, Austria, Sweden, France and Belgium. On 20 October 1994, during the height of their success, they were featured on BBC Television's Top of the Pops, when their average age, as a band, was fourteen. The group released their first album, Ultimate Kaos, in 1995 and it included the hits "Hoochie Booty" and "Show a Little Love". The group released their second album, The Kaos Theory in 1996. This included the hits "Casanova" (a cover of LeVert's 1987 hit), "My Lover", and "Anything You Want (I've Got It)". They also appeared on the Childliners' record, "The Gift of Christmas".

After they split up in 1999, Eshun appeared on the television programme, Reborn in the USA, and also attempted to enter the Eurovision Song Contest.

Eshun released a solo album titled Justice in 2009 and also appeared in the West End stage musical Thriller – Live in London.

== Discography ==
=== Albums ===
Title	Album details	Peak chart positions		
Title	Album details	UK	UK R&B	NED
Ultimate Kaos	Released: April 1995; Label: Wildcard (#527 444–2); Formats: CD, CS	51	14	—
The Kaos Theory	Released: June 1998; Label: Mercury (#538 177–2); Formats: CD, CS	—	—	49
"—" denotes items that did not chart or were not released in that territory.

=== Singles ===
Year	Title	Peak chart positions										Certifications	Album
Year	Title	UK	UK R&B	AUS	AUT	BEL	FRA	IRE	NED	SCO	SWE	Certifications	Album
1992	"Farewell My Summer Love" (as Chaos)	55	—	—	—	—	—	—	—	—	—		Non-album single
1994	"Some Girls"	9	3	—	—	—	—	22	—	17	—		Ultimate Kaos
1995	"Hoochie Booty"	17	6	—	—	—	—	13	—	29	—		Ultimate Kaos
1995	"Show a Little Love"	23	4	—	—	—	—	23	—	31	—		Ultimate Kaos
1995	"Right Here"	18	6	—	—	—	—	—	—	29	—		Ultimate Kaos
1997	"Casanova"	24	6	—	—	—	4	—	—	37	—		The Kaos Theory
1998	"Casanova" (re-release)	29	6	18	20	6	—	—	2	40	19	ARIA: Gold	The Kaos Theory
1998	"My Lover"	—	—	—	—	28	40	—	10	—	—		The Kaos Theory
1998	"Smile Some More"	—	—	—	—	—	—	—	—	—	—		The Kaos Theory
1999	"Anything You Want (I've Got It)"	52	—	20	—	—	—	—	57	63	—		The Kaos Theory
"—" denotes items that did not chart or were not released in that territory.
