= Hold Me, Thrill Me, Kiss Me, Kill Me =

1995 single by U2

Single by U2

from the album Batman Forever: Original Music from the Motion Picture
- B-side: "Theme from Batman Forever"; "Tell Me Now"
- Released: 5 June 1995
- Studio: The Factory (Dublin); Windmill Lane (Dublin); Wild Bunch (London); Olympic (London)
- Length: 4:47
- Label: Atlantic; Island
- Composer: U2
- Lyricist: Bono
- Producers: Nellee Hooper; Bono; The Edge

U2 singles chronology
"Stay (Faraway, So Close!)" (1993)	"Hold Me, Thrill Me, Kiss Me, Kill Me" (1995)	"Miss Sarajevo" (1995)

Alternative Cover
- Gift bag release cover (U.S.)

"Hold Me, Thrill Me, Kiss Me, Kill Me" is a song by Irish rock band U2. It was released as a single from the soundtrack album for the film Batman Forever on 5 June 1995 by Atlantic and Island Records. A number-one single in their home country of Ireland, as well as in seven other countries, it reached number two on the UK Singles Chart, number 16 on the US Billboard Hot 100, and number one on the Billboard Album Rock Tracks and Modern Rock Tracks charts. The song received Grammy Award nominations for Best Rock Performance by a Duo or Group with Vocal and Best Rock Song. The song is included on the compilation album The Best of 1990–2000 and the live album From the Ground Up: Edge's Picks from U2360°. Its music video was directed by Kevin Godley and Maurice Linnane.

== History ==
"Hold Me, Thrill Me, Kiss Me, Kill Me" has its origins in the sessions for the band's 1993 album, Zooropa. Bono described it as being about "being in a rock band" and "being a star". The song's title comes from a play on the classic song "Hold Me, Thrill Me, Kiss Me" and it is actually visible (along with the titles of other unfinished tracks) on the album cover of Zooropa, written in purple text.

U2's involvement with the soundtrack began when director Joel Schumacher attempted to create a cameo role for Bono as MacPhisto in Batman Forever, in which the character was intended to appear at a party scene. Although both tried to make the scene happen, they came to agree it was not suitable for the film. Instead, the band offered "Hold Me, Thrill Me, Kiss Me, Kill Me" as a contribution to the soundtrack.

The song was played live on every show of the PopMart Tour as part of the encore and appeared at all 93 of the tour's concerts. It was not played again until the 2010 leg of the U2 360° Tour, opening the second encore. From there, it remained a permanent part of the encore until the end of the tour in 2011. "Weird Al" Yankovic recorded a parody for his album Bad Hair Day titled "Cavity Search".

During U2's 2018 Experience + Innocence Tour, a new "Gotham Experience Remix" of the song was played during a brief intermission in the concerts. Remixed by St Francis Hotel, the track contains vocals by Gavin Friday and Arcade Fire's Régine Chassagne. In November 2018, the remix was released on a limited edition 12-inch vinyl single for Black Friday Record Store Day, with a remaster of the original song on the reverse side.

== Critical reception ==
Steve Baltin from Cash Box named "Hold Me, Thrill Me, Kiss Me, Kill Me" a Pick of the Week, adding, "As a song, it's more electronical than anything they've done previously, but if one looks closely enough at their recent efforts, namely Zooropa, the transition follows a smooth path." Pan-European magazine Music & Media wrote, "In the week Superman suffered dearly from his broken wings, his rival Batman enjoys his best tribute since Prince's attempt. Atypical U2 with strings and handclaps, The The and T-Rex blend." British magazine Music Week gave it a score of four out of five in their review, adding, "U2 fans are in for a treat with the first release from the Batman Forever soundtrack, a swirling rock affair with orchestral overtones."

Keith Cameron from NME commented, "In which U2 donate a slice of half-hearted orchestral Bolan-boogie for the new Batman movie, thereby providing a perhaps inadvertent and certainly long-overdue explanation for all that MacPhisto nonsense: Bono was secretly auditioning for the part of Penguin." Smash Hits predicted that it would be a future hit, writing, "Not much of a prediction this, more like an absolute dead cert. [...] Not their catchiest tune but with real power and energy to make this a certain Top 3 hit." David Sinclair from The Times described the song as "a suitably gothic production." He explained, "Introduced by a deceptively languid riff, Bono's vocal slithers out of the speakers swathed in that sinister phrasing effect which he first deployed on Zoo Station. You don't know what you're doing, babe it must be art, he sneers while synthesizers, an orchestra and a big buzzy guitar sound create a dark, restless backdrop hovering somewhere between 'I am the Walrus' and 'Children of the Revolution'."

=== Accolades ===
It was nominated for a Golden Globe Award for Best Original Song, losing to "Colors of the Wind" for Pocahontas. It also received Grammy Award nominations for Best Rock Performance by a Duo or Group with Vocal and Best Rock Song. It also received a Golden Raspberry Award nomination for Worst Original Song, where it lost to "Walk Into the Wind" from Showgirls.

== Music video ==
The animated music video to the song (interspersed with clips from the film) was directed by Kevin Godley and Maurice Linnane. It features the band performing in Gotham City, with Bono battling between two of his alter-egos from the Zoo TV Tour: "The Fly" and "MacPhisto." The band also chases the Batwing, using a yellow supercar and their guitars as flamethrowers. The animated sequence also features characters dressed as The Riddler, Dr. Chase Meridian, and Dick Grayson, in scenes similar to those in the movie.

At one brief point of the video, a neon sign can be seen that reads "Mister Pussey's". In another scene, U2 are seen walking down the street when Bono is run over by a car (driven by Elvis) while reading a copy of C.S. Lewis' The Screwtape Letters. The next scene shows Bono in the hospital flatlining and about to die, when a bolt of red lightning strikes his heart monitor turning his skin white, his shirt red, and causing his fingernails to grow, thus transforming him into MacPhisto. He makes his appearance, terrifying the doctors and the other band members. The video ends with an orchestra of Batmen playing the outro on strings, then a shot from above of MacPhisto repeatedly transforming into Batman and MacPhisto alternately.

Author Višnja Cogan said the video "crystallises and concludes the Zoo TV period and the changes that occurred" for the band during that time.

== Formats and track listings ==
The song featured singles with three different track listings. Note that the B-sides on the first two singles are non-U2 songs.

7-inch vinyl, cassette, and CD release
No.	Title	Length
1.	"Hold Me, Thrill Me, Kiss Me, Kill Me"	4:47
2.	"Themes from Batman Forever" (by Elliot Goldenthal)	3:39

CD maxi (UK, German, and Japan release)
No.	Title	Length
1.	"Hold Me, Thrill Me, Kiss Me, Kill Me"	4:47
2.	"Themes from Batman Forever" (by Elliot Goldenthal)	3:39
3.	"Tell Me Now" (by Mazzy Star)	4:17

CD (US release)
No.	Title	Length
1.	"Hold Me, Thrill Me, Kiss Me, Kill Me"	4:47

There was also a single-track CD distributed in the U.S as part of a Batman Forever gift bag, along with a collectible comic book, trading card, and pogs.

== Personnel ==
- Bono – vocals
- The Edge – guitar, string arrangement
- Adam Clayton – bass guitar
- Larry Mullen Jr. – drums
- Marius de Vries – keyboards, programming
- Craig Armstrong – string arrangement

== Charts ==
=== Weekly charts ===
Chart (1995)	Peak position
Australia (ARIA)	1
Austria (Ö3 Austria Top 40)	3
Belgium (Ultratop 50 Flanders)	15
Belgium (Ultratop 50 Wallonia)	4
Canada Top Singles (RPM)	3
Canada Rock/Alternative (RPM)	1
Denmark (IFPI)	2
Europe (Eurochart Hot 100)	2
Europe (European Hit Radio)	1
Finland (Suomen virallinen lista)	1
France (SNEP)	10
Germany (GfK)	8
Hungary (Mahasz)	1
Iceland (Íslenski Listinn Topp 40)	1
Ireland (IRMA)	1
Israel (Israeli Singles Chart)	9
Italy (Musica e dischi)	3
Italy Airplay (Music & Media)	1
Netherlands (Dutch Top 40)	9
Netherlands (Single Top 100)	7
New Zealand (Recorded Music NZ)	1
Norway (VG-lista)	1
Scottish Singles Sales (Official Charts)	1
Sweden (Sverigetopplistan)	2
Switzerland (Schweizer Hitparade)	5
UK Singles (Official Charts)	2
US Billboard Hot 100	16
US Alternative Airplay (Billboard)	1
US Mainstream Rock (Billboard)	1
US Pop Airplay (Billboard)	23

=== Year-end charts ===
Chart (1995)	Position
Australia (ARIA)	29
Austria (Ö3 Austria Top 40)	25
Belgium (Ultratop 50 Flanders)	73
Belgium (Ultratop 50 Wallonia)	28
Canada Top Singles (RPM)	29
Canada Rock/Alternative (RPM)	6
Europe (Eurochart Hot 100)	19
Europe (European Hit Radio)	6
France (SNEP)	35
Germany (Media Control)	52
Iceland (Íslenski Listinn Topp 40)	5
Netherlands (Dutch Top 40)	76
Netherlands (Single Top 100)	79
New Zealand (RIANZ)	31
Sweden (Topplistan)	17
Switzerland (Schweizer Hitparade)	19
UK Singles (OCC)	19
UK Airplay (Music Week)	21
US Billboard Hot 100	81
US Album Rock Tracks (Billboard)	14
US Modern Rock Tracks (Billboard)	19

== Certifications ==
Region	Certification	Certified units/sales
Australia (ARIA)	Gold	35,000^{^}
France (SNEP)	Gold	250,000^{*}
New Zealand (RMNZ)	Gold	5,000^{*}
United Kingdom (BPI)	Gold	400,000^{^}
^{*} Sales figures based on certification alone.^{^} Shipments figures based on certification alone.

== Release history ==
Region	Date	Format(s)	Label(s)	Ref.
United States	30 May 1995	Contemporary hit radio	Atlantic; Island	
United Kingdom	5 June 1995	7-inch vinyl; CD; cassette	Atlantic; Island	
Japan	25 August 1995	CD	Atlantic; Island	

== See also ==
- List of cover versions of U2 songs – Hold Me, Thrill Me, Kiss Me, Kill Me
- List of number-one singles in Australia during the 1990s
- List of RPM number-one alternative rock singles of 1995
- List of number-one singles of 1995 (Ireland)
- List of number-one singles in 1995 (New Zealand)
- List of number-one hits in Norway
- List of number-one mainstream rock hits (United States)
- Number one modern rock hits of 1995
