= Some Girls (Ultimate Kaos song) =

1994 single by Ultimate Kaos

Single by Ultimate Kaos

from the album Ultimate Kaos
- B-side: "Love You Like This"
- Released: 10 October 1994
- Genre: Pop; ragga; reggae
- Length: 4:17
- Label: Wildcard; Motown
- Songwriter: Ricky Rainbow
- Producers: Michael Barnes; Ricky Rainbow

Ultimate Kaos singles chronology
"Farewell My Summer Love" (1992)	"Some Girls" (1994)	"Hoochie Booty" (1995)

"Some Girls" is a song by British boy band Ultimate Kaos, released in October 1994 by Wildcard and Motown as the lead single from their 1995 eponymous debut album. The song was written by Ricky Rainbow and produced by him with Michael Barnes. It was a top-10 hit, peaking at No. 9 on the UK Singles Chart and No. 3 on the UK R&B Singles Chart. In Ireland, the song peaked at No. 22.

== Critical reception ==
Upon the release, pan-European magazine Music & Media wrote, "Some boys revisit the Musical Youth concept, doing a juvenile reggae track in a contemporary production. Qua "hummability" they come close to the instant catchiness of 'Pass the Dutchie'." Alan Jones from Music Week gave the song a score of four out of five, adding, "Young, gifted and black—and British, too. Too slow to be a dance record, yet rhythmically pronounced and straining to break into a reggae beat. The juvenile lead's vocals are alternatively confident and pure and a little shaky. Overall, a classy pop record that will race into the upper reaches of the chart."

Brad Beatnik from the Record Mirror Dance Update noted, "Destined to be huge, this very young five-piece have already been dubbed a Nineties Jackson Five. Another Record Mirror editor, James Hamilton, named it a "somehat raggedly squeaking harmonizing and ragga rapping juvenile guys' Steve Miller Band 'The Joker' like swaying groin grinder" in his weekly dance column. Emma Cochrane from Smash Hits also gave "Some Girls" four out of five, commenting, "The little fellas who are supporting Take That on tour plant their size fours in the footsteps of The Jackson Five, Musical Youth, New Edition etc, and bring it off with style. Although the backing track sounds suspiciously like that tune in the Levi's ad, the vocals are spot on and if you like this funky kind of sound, you can't fault 'em."

== Music video ==
The accompanying music video for "Some Girls" was directed by British designer and director Pete Cornish and produced by Barney Jeffrey for Partizan. It was released on 10 October 1994 and features a choreographed boys versus girls basketball match.

== Track listings ==
The US cassette single B-side features snippets from five songs on Ultimate Kaos: "This Heart Belongs to You", "Misdemeanor", "Show a Little Love", "Weekend Girl", and "Believe in Us".

- UK 7-inch and cassette single
- Japanese mini-CD single
1. "Some Girls" (7-inch mix) – 4:30
2. "Love You Like This" – 4:26
- UK CD single
1. "Some Girls" (7-inch mix)
2. "Some Girls" (Mafia & Fluxy Mix)
3. "Some Girls" (Darkman Ghetto Lab Mix)
4. "Some Girls" (Barry B Boom Mix)
- UK 12-inch single

A1. "Some Girls" (Mafia & Fluxy Mix)
A2. "Some Girls" (Barry B Boom Mix)
B1. "Some Girls" (Darkman Ghetto Lab Mix)
B2. "Some Girls" (Darkman Ghetto instrumental)

- US cassette single

A. "Some Girls" (LP version) – 4:17
B. Album snippets

== Charts ==
=== Weekly charts ===
Chart (1994)	Peak position
Europe (Eurochart Hot 100)	35
Europe (European Dance Radio)	20
Ireland (IRMA)	22
Israel (Israeli Singles Chart)	36
Scottish Singles Sales (Official Charts)	17
UK Singles (Official Charts)	9
UK Airplay (Music Week)	20
UK Hip Hop/R&B (Official Charts)	3

=== Year-end charts ===
Chart (1994)	Position
UK Singles (OCC)	104

== Release history ==
Region	Date	Format(s)	Label(s)	Ref.
United Kingdom	10 October 1994	7-inch vinyl; 12-inch vinyl; CD; cassette	Wildcard	
Australia	3 April 1995	CD; cassette	Polydor; Wildcard	
Japan	26 July 1995	Mini-CD	Polydor	
United States	1 August 1995	Contemporary hit radio	Wildcard; Motown	
