= Happy Clappers =

British house studio project

- Origin: UK
- Genres: House music, Eurodance
- Years active: 1995–1997
- Labels: PWL International; Coalition Recordings; Shindig; Provocative Music
- Past members: Chris Scott; Graeme Ripley; Martin Knotts; Mark Topham; Sandra Edwards

Happy Clappers were a house studio project from the UK, featuring Chris Scott, Graeme Ripley, Martin Knotts and Mark Topham, with Sandra Edwards on vocals.

== Biography ==
Happy Clappers scored chart success in the UK and Ireland from 1995 to 1997.

Their highest peak in the UK charts was number seven with "I Believe". Other UK hits included "Hold On", "Can't Help It" and "Never Again".

Their debut album "Games" which includes all their hit singles including the 97 remix of "I Believe" was released in 1997 without chart success.

"I Believe" was never released in the US until American producer Chris Cox remixed it in 2002. It achieved major club success peaking at number-one on the US Club Play charts.

== Discography ==
=== Studio albums ===
Title	Album details
Games	Released: 1997; Label: Coalition Recordings (# 3984 210 312); Formats: CD

=== Singles ===
Year	Title	Peak chart positions						Album
Year	Title	UK	UK Dance	IRE	SCO	US Club Play	US Dance Sales	Album
1995	"I Believe"	127	—	—	—	—	—	Games
1995	"I Believe" (1st re-release)	21	1	—	48	—	—	Games
1995	"Hold On"	27	2	—	37	—	—	Games
1995	"I Believe" (2nd re-release)	7	1	25	14	—	—	Games
1996	"Can't Help It"	18	3	—	23	2	—	Games
1996	"Never Again"	49	6	—	60	—	—	Games
1997	"I Believe '97"	28	8	—	31	—	—	Games
2003	"I Believe" (Chris Cox remix)	140	40	—	—	1	15	Non-album single
"—" denotes items that did not chart or were not released in that territory.

== See also ==
- List of number-one dance hits (United States)
- List of artists who reached number one on the US Dance chart
