= I Believe (Happy Clappers song) =

Single by Happy Clappers

from the album Games
- Released: 1995; 1997 (Sash!/Roger Sanchez remix); 2003 (Chris Cox remix)
- Genre: Diva house; Eurodance; handbag house
- Length: 4:25
- Label: Shindig; EastWest; PWL International
- Songwriters: C.J Scott; Graeme Ripley; Mark Topham; Martin Knotts
- Producers: C.J Scott; Graeme Ripley; Mark Topham; Martin Knotts

Happy Clappers singles chronology
"I Believe" (1995)	"Hold On" (1995)

Music video
- "I Believe" on YouTube

"I Believe" is a song by British house studio project Happy Clappers, featuring singer Sandra Edwards on vocals, released by Shindig, East West Records and PWL International as the debut single from the project's only album, Games (1997). The song was mixed by Nobby (aka Martin Neary) and re-released two times during 1995, before peaking at number seven on the UK Singles Chart. But on the UK Dance Chart, it was even more successful, reaching number-one in June 1995. In 1997, a remix reached number 28 in the UK. Six years later, in 2003, a remix by American DJ Chris Cox peaked at number-one on the US Billboard Hot Dance Club Play chart, finally seeing the track being released also in the US. "I Believe" remains the project most successful release to date and is by many considered a classic of its genre.

== Critical reception ==
Howard Cohen from Knight-Ridder Newspapers described the song as "a pounding house number with a contagious minor-key piano riff." A reviewer from Music Week gave "I Believe" a score of four out of five, naming it an "up tempo happy house anthem that proved so popular in Ibiza." James Hamilton from the Record Mirror Dance Update declared it as a "diva and chants prodded powerful piano built percussive groove".

== Track listing ==
- 12" single, UK (1995)
1. "I Believe" (12" Master)
2. "I Believe" (Radio Mix)
3. "I Believe" (The Tweakin')
4. "I Believe" (Bath Tub Dub)
- 12", Germany (1997)
1. "I Believe '97" (Sash! Extended Mix) — 5:26
2. "I Believe '97" (Sanchez Backwards Dub) — 9:48
3. "I Believe '97" (Sharp Blasted Remix) — 8:27
4. "I Believe '97" (Original 12" Mix) — 7:15
- 12", UK (2003)
1. "I Believe" (12" Master Mix) — 7:15
2. "I Believe" (Chris Cox Club Mix) — 8:07
- CD single, UK & Europe (1995)
1. "I Believe" (Radio Mix) — 4:25
2. "I Believe" (12" Master) — 7:15
3. "I Believe" (The Tweakin') — 7:33
4. "I Believe" (Bathtub Dub) — 6:40
- CD single, Europe (1997)
1. "I Believe" (Sash Edit) — 3:42
2. "I Believe" (Sanchez Edit) — 4:06
3. "I Believe" (Sash Extended Mix) — 5:27
4. "I Believe" (Sanchez Mongoloids In London Mix) — 9:54
5. "I Believe" (Sharp Blasted Remix) — 8:29
6. "I Believe" (Original 12") — 7:14
- CD maxi, Australia (1995)
1. "I Believe" (Radio Edit) — 3:54
2. "I Believe" (Notloveland Radio Mix) — 3:34
3. "I Believe" (12" Master) — 7:15
4. "I Believe" (Notloveland Full On Vocal Mix) — 8:00
5. "I Believe" (Red Jerry Mix) — 6:48
6. "I Believe" (Tweakin' Mix) — 7:31

== Charts ==
=== Weekly charts ===
Chart (1995)	Peak position
Canada Dance/Urban (RPM)	1
Europe (Eurochart Hot 100)	30
Ireland (IRMA)	25
Scotland (OCC)	14
UK Singles (OCC)	7
UK Dance (OCC)	1
UK Club Chart (Music Week)	2

Chart (1997)	Peak position
Europe (Eurochart Hot 100)	87
Scotland (OCC)	31
UK Singles (OCC)	28
UK Dance (OCC)	8
UK Club Chart (Music Week)	1

Chart (2003)	Peak position
UK Singles (OCC)	140
UK Dance (OCC)	40
US Hot Dance Club Play (Billboard)	1
US Dance/Electronic Singles Sales (Billboard)	15

=== Year-end charts ===
Chart (1995)	Position
Canada Dance/Urban (RPM)	27
UK Club Chart (Music Week)	34
