= The Original (group) =

American house music project

- Genres: House, dance
- Years active: 1990s
- Labels: WT Records, Ore Music
- Past members: Walter Taieb; Everett Bradley; Giuseppe Nuzzo

The Original was a house music project created by French DJ Walter Taieb in his studio in New York City.

In April 1994, after acquiring a CS2000 Euphonix mixing board for his studio, Taieb invited his friend, the Italian DJ and producer Giuseppe Nuzzo (DJ Pippi) who was the resident DJ of Pacha in Ibiza to come to New York to do a track for the summer.

After DJ Pippi's arrival, he played a couple of club tracks to Taieb, that gave the overall direction the recording was to take.

For vocals, Taieb invited another friend, New York session vocalist Everett Bradley. "I Love You Baby (Swing Mix)" was the first release on Taieb's label WT Records in 1994 after Mercury Universal passed on their option to release it. The following year, a remix by Dancing Divaz became a hit single titled as "I Luv U Baby", which reached No. 2 in the UK, No. 6 in Scotland, No. 12 in Ireland and No. 25 in the Netherlands. Its follow-up single, "B 2 Gether" was a top 30 hit in the UK reaching No. 29 and top 10 on the UK Dance Singles Chart at No. 8.

The huge success of "I Luv U Baby" prompted Everett Bradley to perform the song live on the BBC flagship music chart programme Top of the Pops on the 17 August 1995 episode.

== Discography ==
=== Singles ===
Title	Year	Peak chart positions									
Title	Year	US	US Rhythmic	AUS	BEL	EUR	IRE	NLD	SCO	UK	UK Dance
"I Luv U Baby"	1995	66	35	48	48	10	12	25	6	2	3
"B 2 Gether"	1995	—	—	—	—	—	—	—	42	29	8
"2 Your Right" (with Virtualdisco)	1996	—	—	—	—	—	—	—	—	—	—
