= I Luv U Baby =

1995 single by the Original

Single by the Original
- Released: January 2, 1995 (UK)
- Genre: House
- Length: 3:34
- Label: WT; Ore Music
- Songwriters: Walter Taieb; Giuseppe Nuzzo
- Producers: Walter Taieb; Giuseppe Nuzzo

The Original singles chronology
"I Luv U Baby" (1995)	"B 2 Gether" (1995)

Music video
- "I Luv U Baby" on YouTube

"I Luv U Baby" is the debut single of American dance music group the Original, released in the United Kingdom in January 1995 by the labels WT and Ore Music. It was written and produced by Walter Taieb and Giuseppe Nuzzo, with vocals performed by Broadway singer Everett Bradley. Upon its first release in the United Kingdom, the song peaked at number 31 in January 1995, but a re-release later that year proved much more successful, reaching number two. The song also reached number 12 in Ireland and the top 40 in Iceland and the Netherlands. In 1996, "I Luv U Baby" charted in the United States, rising to number 66 on the Billboard Hot 100.

== Critical reception ==
Simon Price from Melody Maker complimented "the peerless melancholy" of "I Luv U Baby". Brad Beatnik from Music Week's RM Dance Update gave it a top score of five out of five, calling it a "thumping piano house tune" that was "apparently rather large in Ibiza this summer". Record Mirror editor James Hamilton described it as "title line moaned and keyboards tinkled cantering" in his weekly dance column.

== Music video ==
The accompanying music video for "I Luv U Baby" was directed by English director Walter Stern. It was a Box Top on British music television channel The Box for 5 weeks in September 1995.

== Charts ==
=== Weekly charts ===
Chart (1994–1996)	Peak position
Australia (ARIA)	48
Belgium (Ultratop 50 Flanders)	48
Europe (Eurochart Hot 100)	10
Europe (European Dance Radio)	10
Iceland (Íslenski Listinn Topp 40)	31
Ireland (IRMA)	12
Israel (Israeli Singles Chart)	23
Netherlands (Dutch Top 40)	25
Netherlands (Single Top 100)	32
Scottish Singles Sales (Official Charts)	6
UK Singles (Official Charts)	2
UK Dance (Official Charts)	3
UK Airplay (Music Week)	11
UK Club Chart (Music Week)	8
US Billboard Hot 100	66
US Top 40/Rhythm-Crossover (Billboard)	38

=== Year-end charts ===
Chart (1995)	Position
Europe (European Dance Radio)	21
UK Singles (OCC)	53

== Certifications ==
Region	Certification	Certified units/sales
United Kingdom (BPI)	Gold	400,000^{‡}
^{‡} Sales+streaming figures based on certification alone.

== Release history ==
Region	Date	Format(s)	Label(s)	Ref.
United Kingdom	January 2, 1995	12-inch vinyl; CD; cassette	Ore Music	
United Kingdom (re-release)	August 7, 1995	12-inch vinyl; CD; cassette	Ore Music	
