= Love Me for a Reason =

1974 single by the Osmonds

- West German single sleeve

Single by the Osmonds

from the album Love Me for a Reason
- B-side: "Fever"
- Released: August 31, 1974
- Recorded: May 21, 1974
- Genre: Pop
- Length: 4:02
- Label: MGM
- Songwriters: Johnny Bristol; Wade Brown, Jr.; David Jones, Jr.
- Producer: Mike Curb

The Osmonds singles chronology
| "I Can't Stop" (1974) | "Love Me for a Reason" (1974) | "Having a Party" (1975) |

"Love Me for a Reason" is a song by American musician Johnny Bristol. It was recorded most famously by American family music group the Osmonds, and released in 1974. Twenty years later, Irish boy band Boyzone covered the song. Both versions were successful, reaching the top 10 of the charts in many countries.

== Original song and covers ==
The original version by Johnny Bristol, from his 1974 album Hang On In There Baby, was released as a single on MGM in 1974, but "Love Me for a Reason" quickly became associated with another MGM act, the Osmonds. The song was more lyrically intimate than most of the Osmonds' repertoire, but sensing that the moral of the song was still in good taste and did not promote poor decisions, they agreed to record it anyway. It was their last top ten hit on the US Billboard Hot 100 singles chart, reaching number 10; it peaked at number two on the Billboard Adult Contemporary chart. In the UK Singles Chart it fared even better, spending three weeks at the top in August 1974. There was a lovers rock version of the song issued on Trojan records in 1976, credited to the Fabulous Five Inc (aka Fab Five Inc), that scored well in Jamaica and in the United Kingdom.

=== Track listing ===
- 7-inch single
1. "Love Me for a Reason" — 4:02
2. "Fever" — 3:15
- Dave Aude Remixes Single
1. "Love Me for a Reason" (Dave Aude Remix) - 3:23
2. "Love Me for a Reason" (Dave Aude Extended Remix) - 6:01

=== Charts ===
==== Weekly charts ====
| Chart (1974) | Peak position |
|---|---|
| Belgium (Ultratop Flanders) | 26 |
| Canada Top Singles (RPM) | 18 |
| Canada Adult Contemporary | 5 |
| Ireland (Irish Singles Chart) | 2 |
| Netherlands (Dutch Singles Chart) | 19 |
| UK Singles (OCC) | 1 |
| US Billboard Hot 100 | 10 |
| US Easy Listening (Billboard) | 2 |
| US Cash Box Top 100 | 8 |
| West Germany (GfK) | 39 |

==== Year-end charts ====
| Chart (1974) | Rank |
|---|---|
| Canada Top Singles (RPM) | 134 |
| UK | 12 |
| US (Joel Whitburn's Pop Annual) | 103 |

=== Certifications ===
| Region | Certification | Certified units/sales |
|---|---|---|
| United Kingdom (BPI) | Gold | 500,000^{^} |
^{^} Shipments figures based on certification alone.

== Boyzone version ==
"Love Me for a Reason"

Single by Boyzone

from the album Said and Done
- B-side: "Daydream Believer"
- Released: November 28, 1994 (UK)
- Genre: Pop
- Length: 3:39
- Label: Polydor
- Songwriters: Wade Brown, Jr.; David Jones, Jr.; Johnny Bristol
- Producer: Ray Hedges

Boyzone singles chronology
| "Working My Way Back to You" (1994) | "Love Me for a Reason" (1994) | "Key to My Life" (1995) |

Music video
- "Love Me for a Reason" on YouTube

"Love Me for a Reason" was revived by Irish boy band Boyzone in 1994, released by Polydor Records as the second single from their debut album, Said and Done (1994). The song was produced by Ray Hedges, and released in Ireland in late 1994 and was issued in the United Kingdom several weeks later, on November 28, 1994. It also became their breakthrough single, reaching number one on the Irish Singles Chart, In the United Kingdom, the song debuted at number ten on the UK Singles Chart in early December 1994 and peaked at number two in January 1995. In the UK, it was the 19th-best-selling single of 1994 and received a Platinum sales certification for over 600,000 copies sold in the UK.

=== Critical reception ===
Peter Fawthrop from AllMusic named the song a "peppy tribute" to the Osmonds. Caroline Sullivan from The Guardian praised it as a "gem" from their debut album. In his weekly UK chart commentary, James Masterton wrote, "Be warned. This is just the first instalment of a cover battle over this song and could well be the start of a mini-Osmonds revival in the new year. [...] The timing of the release is impeccable. I'm a sucker for a good pop record, well made and this ranks with the best of all of them, the harmonies are impeccable and the song has a proven track record. Now strongly in the running for the coveted seasonal No.1 slot, Boyzone are off and running." Alan Jones from Music Week said that the band "enter the overcrowded teen heart-throbs staker, with a competent if uninspired rendition of the old Osmonds' hit, which should win them plenty of children's TV slots, and a place in the bottom half of the Top 40." Smash Hits gave it a top score of five out of five, writing, "It still sounds perfect to us!"

=== Music video ===
A music video was produced to promote "Love Me for a Reason". It features the band performing the song in a basement, wearing black and white costumes. The boys are surrounded by large candelabras, curtains and pub height tables covered with candles. In between, a girl dressed in white appears. The video was a Box Top on British music television channel The Box in December 1994.

=== Track listings ===
- UK CD1 (jewel case)
1. "Love Me for a Reason" – 3:41
2. "Daydream Believer" – 3:06
- UK CD2 (limited-edition digipak with poster)
1. "Love Me for a Reason" – 3:41
2. "Daydream Believer" – 3:06
- Japanese CD single
1. "Love Me for a Reason" – 3:39
2. "Daydream Believer" – 3:07
3. "Working My Way Back to You" (original) – 3:41
4. "Father and Son" (original demo) – 2:40

=== Charts ===
==== Weekly charts ====
| Chart (1994–1996) | Peak position |
|---|---|
| Argentina (CAPIF) | 2 |
| Australia (ARIA) | 48 |
| Belgium (Ultratop 50 Flanders) | 1 |
| Belgium (Ultratop 50 Wallonia) | 12 |
| Denmark (IFPI) | 4 |
| El Salvador (El Siglo de Torreón) | 1 |
| Europe (Eurochart Hot 100) | 6 |
| Europe (European AC Radio) | 8 |
| Europe (European Hit Radio) | 12 |
| Europe (Channel Crossovers) | 7 |
| France (SNEP) | 28 |
| France Airplay (SNEP) | 19 |
| Germany (GfK) | 47 |
| Greece (IFPI Greece) | 3 |
| Holland Airplay (Music & Media) | 1 |
| Iceland (Íslenski Listinn Topp 40) | 35 |
| Ireland (IRMA) | 1 |
| Israel (Israeli Singles Chart) | 1 |
| Italy Airplay (Music & Media) | 20 |
| Netherlands (Dutch Top 40) | 7 |
| Netherlands (Single Top 100) | 7 |
| Norway (VG-lista) | 16 |
| Scottish Singles Sales (Official Charts) | 3 |
| Singapore (SPVA) | 1 |
| Sweden (Sverigetopplistan) | 28 |
| Switzerland (Schweizer Hitparade) | 15 |
| UK Singles (Official Charts) | 2 |
| UK Airplay (Music Week) | 5 |

==== Year-end charts ====
| Chart (1994) | Position |
|---|---|
| UK Singles (OCC) | 19 |

| Chart (1995) | Position |
|---|---|
| Belgium (Ultratop 50 Flanders) | 45 |
| Belgium (Ultratop 50 Wallonia) | 42 |
| Europe (Eurochart Hot 100) | 62 |
| Israel (Israeli Singles Chart) | 32 |
| Netherlands (Dutch Top 40) | 34 |
| Netherlands (Single Top 100) | 49 |
| Netherlands Airplay (Music & Media) | 6 |
| UK Singles (OCC) | 87 |

| Chart (1996) | Position |
|---|---|
| France (SNEP) | 96 |

=== Certifications ===
| Region | Certification | Certified units/sales |
|---|---|---|
| United Kingdom (BPI) | Platinum | 600,000^{‡} |
^{‡} Sales+streaming figures based on certification alone.

=== Release history ===
| Region | Date | Format(s) | Label(s) | Ref. |
|---|---|---|---|---|
| Ireland | 1994 | CD | Polydor | |
| United Kingdom | November 28, 1994 | 7-inch vinyl; CD; cassette | Polydor | |
| Australia | February 6, 1995 | CD; cassette | Polydor | |
| Japan | June 10, 1995 | CD | Polydor | |
