= So Good (Boyzone song) =

1995 single by Boyzone

Single by Boyzone

from the album Said and Done
- B-side: "Here to Eternity"; "And You"
- Released: 31 July 1995
- Genre: Pop
- Length: 3:03
- Label: Polydor
- Songwriters: Martin Brannigan; Keith Duffy; Stephen Gately; Mikey Graham; Ray Hedges; Ronan Keating; Shane Lynch
- Producer: Ray Hedges

Boyzone singles chronology
"Key to My Life" (1995)	"So Good" (1995)	"Father and Son" (1995)

Music video
- "So Good" on YouTube

"So Good" is a song by Irish boyband Boyzone and released in July 1995 by Polydor Records as the fourth single from the band's debut album, Said and Done (1995). The song was co-written by the members of the band and produced by Ray Hedges. It became Boyzone's third consecutive No. 1 single in Ireland entered the UK Singles Chart at No. 3.

== Critical reception ==
In his weekly UK chart commentary in Dotmusic, James Masterton stated that the song "finally moves them away from the pretty balladeering style of the last two singles and into a more uptempo pop groove." He felt "it is a competent enough single that sounds great on the radio in the sunshine". Pan-European magazine Music & Media wrote, "These Irish teenyboppers can definitely carry a good pop tune. The Deadly Mix has a slower, sexier rhythm, but don't expect any gangsta killa stuff." Music Week gave it four out of five, adding, "The Irish pretty boys turn in some more can't-fail pop, and this time it's got a more mature swing to it." Also Jordan Paramor from Smash Hits gave the song four out of five, writing, "Tonight, Ladies and Gentlemen, Boyzone are... MN8! Yes, the Dublin fivesome have gone and got funky! Brace yourselves though, 'cos it takes a bit of getting used to, but I guarantee that by the fourth listen you'll be jangling round your room, clicking your fingers and muttering, "Oh gosh... this is soo good!" Ha-ha!"

== Music video ==
A music video was produced to promote the single, featuring the band performing inside what appears to be an abandoned factory. It was later published on Boyzone's official YouTube channel in December 2009. The video has amassed more than 1 million views as of September 2021.

== Track listings ==
- UK CD1
1. "So Good" (radio edit) – 3:03
2. "Here to Eternity" – 3:33
3. "So Good" (The 'Deadly' Mix) – 3:10
- UK CD2 (with limited-edition postcards)
1. "So Good" (radio edit)
2. "Here to Eternity"
3. "So Good" (The 'Deadly' Mix)
4. "And You"
- European CD single
1. "So Good" (radio edit) – 3:03
2. "Here to Eternity" – 3:33

== Charts ==
=== Weekly charts ===
Chart (1995)	Peak position
Australia (ARIA)	179
Belgium (Ultratop 50 Flanders)	26
Europe (Eurochart Hot 100)	15
Europe (European Hit Radio)	33
Europe (Channel Crossovers)	10
Germany (GfK)	69
Hungary Airplay (HCRA)	15
Ireland (IRMA)	1
Israel (IBA)	1
Netherlands (Dutch Top 40 Tipparade)	5
Netherlands (Single Top 100 Tipparade)	5
Norway (VG-lista)	6
Scottish Singles Sales (Official Charts)	2
UK Singles (Official Charts)	3
UK Airplay (Music Week)	5

=== Year-end charts ===
Chart (1995)	Position
UK Singles (OCC)	93

== Release history ==
Region	Date	Format(s)	Label(s)	Ref.
United Kingdom	31 July 1995	CD; cassette	Polydor	
Australia	23 October 1995	CD; cassette	Polydor	
