= Key to My Life =

1995 single by Boyzone

Single by Boyzone

from the album Said and Done
- B-side: "When Will You Understand?"
- Released: 17 April 1995
- Length: 3:46
- Label: Polydor
- Songwriters: Stephen Gately; Mikey Graham; Ronan Keating; Ray Hedges; Martin Brannigan
- Producer: Ray Hedges

Boyzone singles chronology
"Love Me for a Reason" (1994)	"Key to My Life" (1995)	"So Good" (1995)

Music video
- "Key to My Life" on YouTube

"Key to My Life" is the third single from Irish boy band Boyzone, taken from their debut album, Said and Done (1995). It was released in April 1995 by Polydor Records, and after two covers, it became their first single to be an original song, co-written by members of the group. The song became the group's second No. 1 single in Ireland and reached No. 3 on the UK Singles Chart, receiving a silver sales certification for shipments of over 200,000 units in the UK. "Key to My Life" also reached the top 40 in Belgium, Iceland, and the Netherlands. The accompanying music video features the band performing in a classroom at a school.

== Critical reception ==
In his weekly UK chart commentary, James Masterton wrote, "Their second hit could have suffered from not being such a well known song but the pretty teen ballad is having none of it, their second instant Top 10 hit in succession and for now there is clearly no stopping them." Pan-European magazine Music & Media commented, "In their homeland Ireland, the boyz' own fan club is already strong enough to kick their main inspirators Take That off the top slot with another sugary ballad." Music Week gave it a top score of five out of five and named it Single of the Week, writing, "Boyzone, who reached number two with their 'Love Me for a Reason' cover, could go all the way with this excellent self-penned ballad. The cheery, cheesy dance mix, which is also included, could have made it in its own right." Smash Hits gave it four out of five, praising it as "beautiful!"

== Track listings ==
- UK CD single
1. "Key to My Life" (radio edit)
2. "Key to My Life" (Unlocked Mix)
3. "When Will You Understand?"
- Australasian and Japanese CD single
1. "Key to My Life" (radio edit)
2. "Key to My Life" (Unlocked mix)
3. "When Will You Understand?"
4. "Boyzone, Spoken Word"

== Charts ==
=== Weekly charts ===
Chart (1995)	Peak position
Australia (ARIA)	167
Belgium (Ultratop 50 Flanders)	15
Belgium (Ultratop 50 Wallonia)	23
Europe (Eurochart Hot 100)	6
Europe (European AC Radio)	15
Europe (European Hit Radio)	16
Europe (Channel Crossovers)	10
Germany (GfK)	64
Greece (IFPI Greece)	6
Iceland (Íslenski Listinn Topp 40)	32
Ireland (IRMA)	1
Israel (IBA)	2
Netherlands (Dutch Top 40)	10
Netherlands (Single Top 100)	12
Netherlands Airplay (Music & Media)	6
Scottish Singles Sales (Official Charts)	3
UK Singles (Official Charts)	3
UK Airplay (Music Week)	5

=== Year-end charts ===
Chart (1995)	Position
Belgium (Ultratop 50 Flanders)	82
Belgium (Ultratop 50 Wallonia)	96
UK Singles (OCC)	69

== Certifications ==
Region	Certification	Certified units/sales
United Kingdom (BPI)	Silver	200,000^{^}
^{^} Shipments figures based on certification alone.

== Release history ==
Region	Date	Format(s)	Label(s)	Ref.
United Kingdom	17 April 1995	CD; cassette	Polydor	
Australia	24 July 1995	CD; cassette	Polydor	
Japan	25 August 1995	CD	Polydor	
