= Father and Son (song) =

1970 single by Cat Stevens

- Cover of the German single edition

Single by Cat Stevens

from the album Tea for the Tillerman
- B-side: "Moonshadow"
- Released: August 1970
- Recorded: July 1970
- Genre: Folk rock
- Length: 3:41
- Label: Island (UK/Europe); A&M (US/Canada)
- Songwriter: Cat Stevens
- Producer: Paul Samwell-Smith

Cat Stevens singles chronology
"Lady D'Arbanville" (1970)	"Father and Son" (1970)	"Wild World" (1970)

Audio sample
- "Father and Son", as it appears on Cat Stevens's 1970 album Tea for the Tillerman: file; help

Official video
- "Father and Son" on YouTube

"Father and Son" is a song written and recorded by English singer-songwriter Cat Stevens (now known as Yusuf/Cat Stevens) in 1970, appearing on his album Tea for the Tillerman. The song frames a heartbreaking exchange between a father not understanding a son's desire to break away and shape a new life, and the son who cannot really explain himself but knows that it is time for him to seek his own destiny.

Stevens sings in a deeper register for the father's lines, while using a higher one for those of the son. Additionally, there are backing vocals provided by Stevens' guitarist and friend Alun Davies beginning mid-song, singing an unusual chorus of simple refrains. In 2021, it was listed at No. 408 on Rolling Stone's "Top 500 Best Songs of All Time".

== Background ==
Cat Stevens originally wrote "Father and Son" as part of a proposed musical project starring Nigel Hawthorne, called Revolussia, that was set during the Russian Revolution, and could also have become a film; the song was about a boy who wanted to join the revolution against the wishes of his conservative farmer father. The father wants things to remain the way they are, but the son feels inspired by the revolution. Stevens later stated, despite the fact that he was able to represent both sides, he associated more with the son. Stevens wrote the song during a period of convalescence in hospital after being diagnosed tuberculosis in 1969. The project was shelved; but "Father and Son" remained, now in a broader context that reflected not just the societal conflict of Stevens' time, but also captured the impulses of older and younger generations in general.

"Father and Son" received substantial airplay on progressive rock and album-oriented rock radio formats, and played a key role in establishing Stevens as a new voice worthy of attention.

Interviewed soon after the release of "Father and Son", Stevens was asked if the song was autobiographical. Responding to the interviewer from Disc, he said, "I've never really understood my father, but he always let me do whatever I wanted—he let me go. 'Father And Son' is for those people who can't break loose."

Speaking to Rolling Stone in 1973, Stevens has said he was aware that "Father and Son" and several other of his songs meant a great deal to a large number of fans. He said:

"Some people think that I was taking the son's side. But how could I have sung the father's side if I couldn't have understood it, too? I was listening to that song recently and I heard one line and realized that that was my father's father's father's father's father's father's father's father speaking."

By 2007, Stevens (then known as Yusuf Islam) recorded the song again in "Yusuf's Cafe Sessions" of 2007 on DVD again with Alun Davies, and a small band playing acoustic instruments. The performance was presented in a video with two close camera shots of his wife and daughter, holding his infant grandchild.

In 2020, Stevens released a re-recorded version of "Father and Son". This version, which appears on Tea for the Tillerman 2, features the original recording of Stevens' vocals (at the age of 22) alongside the present-day voice of Stevens (age 72). The animated music video of "Father and Son" also pays homage to the original release by featuring video clips from the 1970 music video released 50 years earlier.

== Charts ==
1971 chart performance
Chart (1971)	Peak position
Netherlands (Single Top 100)	23

2014 chart performance
Chart (2014)	Peak position
Italy (FIMI)	12

== Certifications ==
Certifications for "Father and Son"
Region	Certification	Certified units/sales
Germany (BVMI)	Gold	250,000^{‡}
Italy (FIMI)	Platinum	50,000^{‡}
New Zealand (RMNZ)	3× Platinum	90,000^{‡}
Spain (Promusicae)	Platinum	60,000^{‡}
United Kingdom (BPI)	Gold	400,000^{‡}
^{‡} Sales+streaming figures based on certification alone.

== Flaming Lips lawsuit ==
The American rock band the Flaming Lips released a song titled "Fight Test" on their 2002 album Yoshimi Battles the Pink Robots. "Fight Test" was thought to be so musically similar to "Father and Son" that it resulted in a lawsuit. Sony/ATV Music Publishing, representing Yusuf Islam, and EMI Music Publishing, representing the Flaming Lips, agreed to divide the royalties for "Fight Test" equally between the two parties following a relatively uncontentious settlement. Flaming Lips frontman Wayne Coyne claims that he was unaware of the songs' similarities until producer Dave Fridmann pointed them out.

In an interview with The Guardian, frontman Wayne Coyne stated:

I want to go on record for the first time and say that I really apologise for the whole thing. I really love Cat Stevens. I truly respect him as a great singer-songwriter. And now he wants his money. There was a time during the recording when we said, this has a similarity to 'Father and Son'. Then we purposefully changed those bits. But I do regret not contacting his record company and asking their opinion. Maybe we could have gone 50–50. As it is, Cat Stevens is now getting 75 percent of royalties from 'Fight Test'. We could easily have changed the melody but we didn't. I am really sorry that Cat Stevens thinks I'm purposefully plagiarising his work. I am ashamed. There is obviously a fine line between being inspired and stealing. But if anyone wanted to borrow part of a Flaming Lips song, I don't think I'd bother pursuing it. I've got better things to do. Anyway, Cat Stevens is never going to make much money out of us.

== Covers ==
The song has been covered by many artists over the decades.

=== Notable covers ===
In the 1970s, Black folk singer Richie Havens recorded an extended cover and pluralized the song title, as "Fathers & Sons" on his 1971 album The Great Blind Degree. Johnny Cash also recorded a country duet version with his stepdaughter, Rosie Nix Adams.

The mid-1990s and early 2000s saw a revitalization of the song with Boyzone's and Ronan Keating's disparate pop version, introducing Cat Stevens to a new generation of listeners. The latter version would feature Stevens cameoing in a duet.

After four years of recording and releasing four albums centered around Great American pop standards, Rod Stewart directed his focus to covering contemporary pop rock songs, including this Cat Stevens song, for his 2006 Still the Same... Great Rock Classics of Our Time album.

In 2024, James Arthur Garfunkel recorded and released a duet version featuring his father Art Garfunkel under the moniker Garfunkel & Garfunkel. Similar to Cash and Adams version, the two singers musically explore the song as a generational endearing conversation between the two of them. Their orchestrally lush recording closed out their duets album that was aptly titled Father & Son.

=== Johnny Cash versions ===
Johnny Cash recorded the song twice in his career. The first time he covered the song in 1974 for his 48th album The Junkie and the Juicehead Minus Me. This cover, titled "Father and Daughter (Father and Son)", was a duet with stepdaughter Rosie Nix Adams (with lyrics adjusted to adhere to the different subject matter). This version presented the song as a back and forth conversation between a father and a daughter imploring each other how to approach one's life while the former asks his daughter to stay while she yearns to leave.

A new recording of the Father and Son cover appeared on Cash's posthumous compilation release Unearthed (2003), which featured outtakes from his American Recordings sessions over the years. This duet featured Fiona Apple, and retained the lyrics of Stevens' original song.

=== Boyzone version ===
"Father and Son"

Single by Boyzone

from the album Said and Done
- B-side: "Should Be Missing You Now"
- Released: 13 November 1995
- Length: 2:50
- Label: Polydor
- Songwriter: Cat Stevens
- Producer: Ray Hedges

Boyzone singles chronology
"So Good" (1995)	"Father and Son" (1995)	"Coming Home Now" (1996)

Music video
- "Father and Son" on YouTube

Irish boy band Boyzone released a cover of "Father and Son" in November 1995 by Polydor Records, reaching number two on the UK Singles Chart and number one on the Irish Singles Chart. The cover version is produced by Ray Hedges and received a platinum sales status certification from the British Phonographic Industry. It was also the 13th-best-selling single of 1995 in the UK. In Ireland, it became their fourth consecutive number-one single, and it found international success, peaking at number two in Australia, number 11 in France, and number 15 in Germany.

==== Critical reception ====
Music Week gave Boyzone's version of "Father and Son" a top score of five out of five and named it Single of the Week, writing, "The song that got the audience choking back tears during the recent tour is Boyzone's Christmas single. It's an emotional rendition of the Cat Stevens song – and will be massive." Smash Hits gave it four out of five, naming it a "top ballad sung from the heart." In a separate review, Smash Hits editor Gill Whyte gave the single one out of five, writing, "This is a slowly, with lots of twinkly piano, crescendos and ooh-ah harmonious bits."

==== Track listings ====
- UK CD1
1. "Father and Son" (radio edit) – 2:46
2. "Should Be Missing You Now" – 3:20
3. "Father and Son" (live)
- UK CD2
1. "Father and Son" (radio edit) – 2:46
2. "Should Be Missing You Now" – 3:20
3. "Should Be Missing You Now" (The Other Mix) – 4:40
4. "Father and Son" (the album version) – 2:50
- UK cassette single
1. "Father and Son" (radio edit) – 2:46
2. "Should Be Missing You Now" – 3:20

==== Charts ====
===== Weekly charts =====
Chart (1995–1996)	Peak position
Australia (ARIA)	2
Austria (Ö3 Austria Top 40)	18
Belgium (Ultratop 50 Flanders)	24
Belgium (Ultratop 50 Wallonia)	27
Europe (Eurochart Hot 100)	8
Europe (European AC Radio)	9
Europe (European Hit Radio)	14
Europe (Channel Crossovers)	9
France (SNEP)	11
France Airplay (SNEP)	5
Germany (GfK)	15
Greece (IFPI Greece)	4
Hungary (Mahasz)	9
Iceland (Íslenski Listinn Topp 40)	8
Ireland (IRMA)	1
Israel (Israeli Singles Chart)	2
Netherlands (Dutch Top 40)	7
Netherlands (Single Top 100)	7
New Zealand (Recorded Music NZ)	25
Norway (VG-lista)	8
Scottish Singles Sales (Official Charts)	2
Spain Airplay (Top 40 Radio)	24
Sweden (Sverigetopplistan)	28
UK Singles (Official Charts)	2
UK Airplay (Music Week)	4
Zimbabwe (ZIMA)	8

===== Year-end charts =====
Chart (1995)	Position
UK Singles (OCC)	11

Chart (1996)	Position
Australia (ARIA)	28
Europe (Eurochart Hot 100)	50
France (SNEP)	99
France Airplay (SNEP)	41
Germany (Media Control)	75
Iceland (Íslenski Listinn Topp 40)	66
Netherlands (Dutch Top 40)	56
Netherlands (Single Top 100)	76
UK Singles (OCC)	68

==== Certifications ====
Region	Certification	Certified units/sales
Australia (ARIA)	Gold	35,000^{^}
United Kingdom (BPI)	Platinum	796,000
^{^} Shipments figures based on certification alone.

==== Release history ====
Region	Date	Format(s)	Label(s)	Ref.
United Kingdom	13 November 1995	CD; cassette	Polydor	
Japan	21 December 1995	CD	Polydor	

=== Ronan Keating version ===
"Father and Son"

Single by Ronan Keating featuring Yusuf Islam

from the album 10 Years of Hits
- Released: 13 December 2004
- Length: 3:23
- Label: Polydor
- Songwriter: Cat Stevens
- Producer: Steve Mac

Ronan Keating singles chronology
"I Hope You Dance" (2004)	"Father and Son" (2004)	"Baby Can I Hold You" (2005)

Yusuf Islam singles chronology
"Peace Train" / "Angel of War" (2003)	"Father and Son" (2004)	"Indian Ocean" (2005)

"Father and Son" was covered by Boyzone frontman Ronan Keating and released as the second of three singles from his greatest hits compilation album 10 Years of Hits (2004). The song features guest vocals from Yusuf Islam (Cat Stevens) in the form of a virtual duet. The song peaked at number two on the UK Singles Chart, becoming Keating's 11th top-10 single. Keating donated the profits from the single to the Band Aid Trust.

==== Track listings ====
UK CD1

1. "Father and Son" – 3:21
2. "When You Say Nothing at All" (Spanish duet with Paulina Rubio) – 4:20

UK CD2

1. "Father and Son" – 3:21
2. "Father and Son" (Metrophonic Mix) – 3:57
3. "I Hope You Dance" (video CD-ROM)
4. "Father and Son" (video CD-ROM)

==== Charts ====
===== Weekly charts =====
Chart (2004–2005)	Peak position
Austria (Ö3 Austria Top 40)	41
Belgium (Ultratip Bubbling Under Flanders)	2
Europe (Eurochart Hot 100)	10
Germany (GfK)	27
Ireland (IRMA)	16
Netherlands (Single Top 100)	84
Norway (VG-lista)	10
Romania (Romanian Top 100)	87
Scottish Singles Sales (Official Charts)	2
Sweden (Sverigetopplistan)	37
Switzerland (Schweizer Hitparade)	41
UK Singles (Official Charts)	2
UK Airplay (Music Week)	5

===== Year-end charts =====
Chart (2004)	Position
UK Singles (OCC)	108

==== Certifications ====
Region	Certification	Certified units/sales
United Kingdom (BPI)	Gold	400,000^{‡}
^{‡} Sales+streaming figures based on certification alone.

== In popular culture ==
The song is featured in the 2009 film The Boat That Rocked.

Stevens' original recording is featured in the final scene of the 2017 film Guardians of the Galaxy Vol. 2, in which Peter Quill listens to the song during the funeral of his adoptive father Yondu. On television, the song has been prominent on Welcome to Wrexham (season 1, episode 17), This Is Us (season 6, episode 3), Not Going Out (series 5, episode 2), and the season 3 finale of Ted Lasso (episode 12, "So Long, Farewell"). The song was also used at the beginning of episode "Beg, Bribe, Bully" for the TV series Billions (season 5, episode 3).
