= List of UK R&B Singles Chart number ones of 1995 =

The UK R&B Chart is a weekly chart that ranks the 40 biggest-selling singles and albums that are classified in the R&B genre in the United Kingdom. The chart is compiled by the Official Charts Company, and is based on physical and other physical formats. This is a list of the UK's biggest R&B hits of 1995.

== Number ones ==
Key
†	Best-selling R&B single of the year

Issue date	Single	Artist
1 January	"All I Want for Christmas Is You"	Mariah Carey
8 January	"Here Comes the Hotstepper"	Ini Kamoze
15 January	"Here Comes the Hotstepper"	Ini Kamoze
22 January	"Here Comes the Hotstepper"	Ini Kamoze
29 January	"Here Comes the Hotstepper"	Ini Kamoze
5 February	"I've Got a Little Something for You"	MN8
12 February	"I've Got a Little Something for You"	MN8
19 February	"I've Got a Little Something for You"	MN8
26 February	"I've Got a Little Something for You"	MN8
5 March	"I've Got a Little Something for You"	MN8
12 March	"Turn On, Tune In, Cop Out"	Freak Power
19 March	"Turn On, Tune In, Cop Out"	Freak Power
26 March	"Two Can Play That Game"	Bobby Brown
2 April	"Two Can Play That Game"	Bobby Brown
9 April	"Two Can Play That Game"	Bobby Brown
16 April	"Two Can Play That Game"	Bobby Brown
23 April	"If You Only Let Me In"	MN8
30 April	"If You Only Let Me In"	MN8
7 May	"If You Only Let Me In"	MN8
14 May	"This Is How We Do It"	Montell Jordan
21 May	"This Is How We Do It"	Montell Jordan
28 May	"(Everybody's Got to Learn Sometime) I Need Your Loving"	Baby D
3 June	"(Everybody's Got to Learn Sometime) I Need Your Loving"	Baby D
10 June	"(Everybody's Got to Learn Sometime) I Need Your Loving"	Baby D
17 June	"Scream"	Michael Jackson and Janet Jackson
24 June	"Stillness in Time"	Jamiroquai
1 July	"Shy Guy"	Diana King
8 July	"Shy Guy"	Diana King
15 July	"Shy Guy"	Diana King
22 July	"Shy Guy"	Diana King
29 July	"Shy Guy"	Diana King
5 August	"Shy Guy"	Diana King
12 August	"Waterfalls"	TLC
19 August	"Waterfalls"	TLC
26 August	"Waterfalls"	TLC
2 September	"Waterfalls"	TLC
9 September	"Waterfalls"	TLC
16 September	"Boombastic"	Shaggy
23 September	"Boombastic"	Shaggy
30 September	"Boombastic"	Shaggy
7 October	"Boombastic"	Shaggy
14 October	"Power of a Woman"	Eternal
21 October	"Gangsta's Paradise" †	Coolio
28 October	"Gangsta's Paradise" †	Coolio
4 November	"Gangsta's Paradise" †	Coolio
11 November	"Gangsta's Paradise" †	Coolio
18 November	"Gangsta's Paradise" †	Coolio
25 November	"Gangsta's Paradise" †	Coolio
2 December	"One Sweet Day"	Mariah Carey and Boyz II Men
9 December	"Gangsta's Paradise" †	Coolio
16 December	"Gangsta's Paradise" †	Coolio
23 December	"Gangsta's Paradise" †	Coolio
30 December	"Gangsta's Paradise" †	Coolio

== See also ==
- List of UK Dance Singles Chart number ones of 1995
- List of UK Independent Singles Chart number ones of 1995
- List of UK Rock & Metal Singles Chart number ones of 1995
- List of UK R&B Albums Chart number ones of 1995
