= Baby It's You (MN8 song) =

1995 single by MN8

Single by MN8

from the album To the Next Level
- B-side: "Happy" (Jodeci mix)
- Released: 23 October 1995
- Genre: R&B; pop-soul
- Length: 4:17
- Label: Columbia; 1st Avenue
- Songwriter(s): T. Swain; P. Sheyne
- Producer(s): Dennis Charles; Ronnie Wilson

MN8 singles chronology
"Happy" (1995)	"Baby It's You" (1995)	"Pathway to the Moon" (1996)

Music video
- "Baby It's You" on YouTube

"Baby It's You" is a song by British R&B group MN8, released in October 1995 by Columbia and 1st Avenue as the fourth single from their debut album, To the Next Level (1995). The song was produced by Dennis Charles and Ronnie Wilson, peaking at number 22 on the UK Singles Chart and number 34 in New Zealand.

== Critical reception ==
A reviewer from Music & Media wrote, "British dance quartet MN8 describes itself as "pop's next generation", but its sexy midtempo single proves it can easily match pop's present royalty. The group's vocal abilities are genuine; a smooth contemporary R&B groove does the rest." Mark Sutherland from NME viewed the song as "sweet pop-soul personified".

== Track listings ==
- CD 1
1. "Baby It's You" (OJI West Coast mix) – 4:17
2. "Happy" (Jodeci mix) – 4:12
3. "Baby It's You" (The Argonauts club mix) – 7:59
4. "Baby It's You" (West London mix) – 3:56
- CD 2
1. "Baby It's You" (OJI West Coast mix) – 4:17
2. "If You Only Let Me In" (R&B mix) – 4:27
3. "I've Got a Little Something for You" (Smooth remix) – 6:27
4. "Lonely" – 4:38
- Cassette single
1. "Baby It's You" (OJI West Coast mix) – 4:17
2. "Happy" (Jodeci mix) – 4:12

== Charts ==
Chart (1995)	Peak position
New Zealand (Recorded Music NZ)	34
Scotland (OCC)	52
UK Singles (OCC)	22
UK Airplay (Music Week)	39
UK Hip Hop/R&B (OCC)	6
