= Happy (Surface song) =

Song by Surface

Single by Surface

from the album Surface
- B-side: "Let's Try Again"
- Released: February 1987
- Genre: Soul; synth-pop
- Length: 3:57
- Label: Columbia
- Songwriters: Bernard Jackson; David Conley; David Townsend
- Producer: Bernard Jackson

Surface singles chronology
"Let's Try Again" (1986)	"Happy" (1987)	"Lately" (1987)

"Happy" is a song originally recorded by British funk band Hi-Tension in 1984, titled as "You Make Me Happy". It was later covered by Surface for their self-titled album released in 1986. A hit single, Surface's version reached number 20 on the US Billboard Hot 100 chart and number two on the Billboard R&B charts in 1987. "Happy" was also featured on Surface's compilation album Perfect 10 and was produced by members Bernard Jackson, David "Pic" Conley and David Townsend.

== Track listing ==
- UK and US 7-inch single
1. "Happy" – 3:57
2. "Let's Try Again" – 3:55

== Charts ==
=== Weekly charts ===
Chart (1987)	Peak position
UK Singles (OCC)	56
US Billboard Hot 100	20
US Adult Contemporary (Billboard)	24
US Hot R&B/Hip-Hop Songs (Billboard)	2

=== Year-end charts ===
Chart (1987)	Position
US Hot Crossover Singles (Billboard)	20

== MN8 version ==
"Happy"

Single by MN8

from the album To the Next Level
- B-side: "I've Got a Little Something for You" (remix)
- Released: 3 July 1995
- Genre: New jack swing
- Length: 4:10
- Label: Columbia; 1st Avenue
- Songwriters: Bernard Jackson; David Townsend; David Conley
- Producers: Dennis Charles; Ronnie Wilson

MN8 singles chronology
"If You Only Let Me In" (1995)	"Happy" (1995)	"Baby It's You" (1995)

Music video
- "Happy" on YouTube

"Happy" was covered by British R&B group MN8 and released in July 1995 as the third single from their debut album, To the Next Level (1995). The song was produced by Dennis Charles and Ronnie Wilson, and peaked at number eight on the UK Singles Chart. It also was a top-20 hit in New Zealand, where it reached number 11. The track was remixed by Dalvin DeGrate of Jodeci.

=== Critical reception ===
In his weekly UK chart commentary, James Masterton described the song as "another immaculate slice of swingbeat pop and another smash hit to boot". Pan-European magazine Music & Media commented, "Releasing singles at the speed of sound, here's their third already. It has nothing to do with the same-titled Stones number. The guys in MN8 work out in a very American swingbeat fashion." Leesa Daniels from Smash Hits gave "Happy" a score of four out of five, writing, "The lads famous for perv dancing and flashing their knickers slow it down a tad this time. It's not quite as instant as their last two outings but it's soppy and sentimental in an extremely catchy, lovely kind of way. It'll leave you with a nice, warm, jelly like feeling in your tummy."

=== Track listings ===
- CD 1 and 12-inch
1. "Happy" (radio edit) – 4:10
2. "Happy" (Jodeci mix) – 4:11
3. "Happy" (2B3 Street mix) – 5:17
4. "I've Got a Little Something for You" (OJI remix) – 4:12
- CD 2
1. "Happy" (radio edit) – 4:10
2. "Happy" (dance mix) – 5:55
3. "Happy" (2B3 Pay Black mix) – 5:17
4. "I've Got a Little Something for You" (Bad Boy Main Pass mix) – 4:17
- Cassette single
1. "Happy" (radio edit) – 4:10
2. "I've Got a Little Something for You" (OJI remix) – 4:12

=== Charts ===
Chart (1995)	Peak position
Belgium (Ultratop 50 Wallonia)	33
Europe (Eurochart Hot 100)	56
Europe (European Dance Radio)	18
Europe (European Hit Radio)	36
France Airplay (SNEP)	89
Ireland (IRMA)	23
Israel (IBA)	37
Italy Airplay (Music & Media)	9
Netherlands (Dutch Top 40 Tipparade)	9
Netherlands (Single Top 100 Tipparade)	10
New Zealand (Recorded Music NZ)	11
UK Singles (Official Charts)	8
UK Airplay (Music Week)	14
UK Hip Hop/R&B (Official Charts)	2
UK Pop Tip Club Chart (Music Week)	16

=== Release history ===
Region	Date	Format(s)	Label(s)	Ref.
United Kingdom	3 July 1995	CD1; cassette	Columbia; 1st Avenue	
United Kingdom	10 July 1995	CD2	Columbia; 1st Avenue	
Australia	4 September 1995	CD; cassette	Columbia; 1st Avenue	
