= VisionArt =

Visual effects company

VisionArt Design & Animation
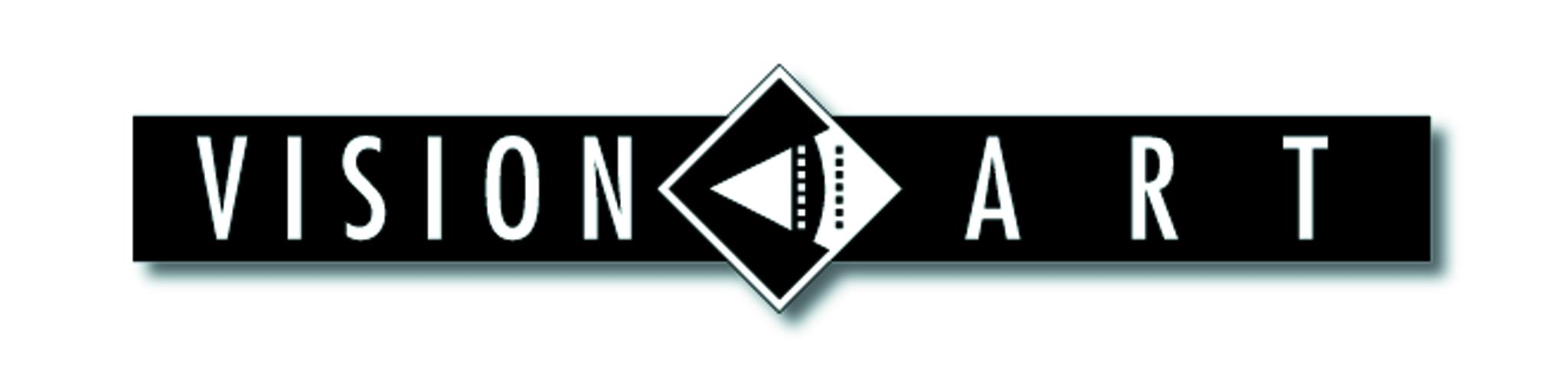
- Type: Private
- Industry: Visual effects, CGI animation
- Founded: 1985
- Defunct: 2000
- Headquarters: Santa Monica, California, USA

VisionArt Design & Animation was a motion picture and television visual effects company, founded in the 1980s by David Rose and Todd Hess. Though originally a small Orange County company working primarily on cable TV advertisements and flying logos, VisionArt moved to Santa Monica in 1992, winning its first major effects work with Star Trek: Deep Space Nine. The studio originated in Santa Ana, California, later moved to Santa Monica, California, where it spawned Santa Monica Studios, Santa Monica Pictures, and its VFX development arm, FutureLight. VisionArt closed in 2000, selling its assets to Digital Art Media.

== Star Trek (1993–1999) ==
=== Star Trek: The Next Generation – 3D Shuttle (1993) ===
The first CGI ship ever used in the Star Trek franchise was created by Dennis Blakey and Dorene Haver. It was a 3D computer model of the "Runabout" shuttle for Star Trek: The Next Generation. Previously, Star Trek had exclusively used physical models, which at the time were composited by Adam Howard and Steve Scott at Digital Magic. VisionArt's 3D model of the Runabout was primarily used for the stretching effect when it jumped to warp.

=== Star Trek: Deep Space Nine – Odo Morphs (1993–1999) ===
Dennis Blakey, who headed the initial development and effects work for the shape-shifting character Odo, brought VisionArt its first prime-time Emmy Award for the pilot and initial episodes. Beginning with season 1, episode 11 "Vortex," Odo morphs were animated by Ted Fay, with Blakey generating the intermediate blobular "goo" state of the shape-shifting character, and Dorene Haver providing the compositing. After Blakey's departure, Odo's "goo" was primarily animated by Carl Hooper and Daniel Kramer, with later Odo morphs animated by Richard Cook.

=== Star Trek: Deep Space Nine – 3D Starships (1993–1997) ===
The USS Defiant was the first full-fledged starship in the Star Trek franchise to have a CGI model used in regular production. It was first built and animated by Daniel Kramer and Carl Hooper. The CGI Defiant was featured heavily in the Season 4 episode Starship Down, where it battled a CGI Jem'Hadar ship, designed by Robert Tom and built by Hooper, in a CGI gas giant's atmosphere. The probe in Starship Down was built by Vinh Le, with Ben Hawkins also providing animation. The gas giant atmosphere was created by Rob Bredow and Pete Shinners using Sparky, a proprietary particle system developed by VisionArt. A further contribution came in season five, with the addition of 3D model of the Jem'Hadar battle cruiser built by Tony Sansalone.

=== Star Trek: Voyager (1995) ===
VisionArt won another Emmy Award for Best Individual Achievement in Effects for their work on Caretaker, the pilot episode of Star Trek: Voyager. Barry Safley created 3D animation for the episode's alien creature, which was revealed to have been hiding in the form of a young girl. Ted Fay animated the reveal, with compositing by Bethany Berndt-Shackelford.

=== Star Trek: First Contact (1996) ===
VisionArt created a 3D Vulcan starship for Star Trek: First Contact. The craft was animated and built by a team led by Daniel Kramer and Carl Hooper, with textures by Robert Tom and composting by Bethany Berndt-Shackelford. The team included Todd Boyce, Rick Cook, Celine Jackson, Jeff Pierce, and others.

== Lois & Clark (1993) ==
VisionArt pioneered the use of full-body human 3D animation for the pilot of Lois & Clark: The New Adventures of Superman for which Rob Bredow, Ted Fay, Carl Hooper, Daniel Kramer, and Pete Shinners, demonstrated the seamless morphing between a human actor and a photorealistic CGI model of the actor.

== Northern Exposure (1993/1994) ==
In 1993, Ted Fay created the first photorealistic talking dog for Northern Exposure, a technology that was further advanced for the film version of Dr. Dolittle. The talking dog was created for season 5, episode 12 entitled Mr. Sandman, which aired January 10, 1994. "The CBS hit series is known for its offbeat scripts and quirky guests, and next week's episode is no exception," observed E! News Daily's Bianca Ferrare, adding "The dog talking here in fluent French-Canadian is a figment of the character's imagination, but the process of giving the dog life is the brainstorm of animators at VisionArt" "Talking animals are nothing new, by 'Mr. Ed' this isn't," added Ferrare. "With 'Mr. Ed' you have the horse that you fed the peanut butter," noted animator Ted Fay, "which they did actually with the dog, but it wasn't at all convincing." "Recent CGI attempts, on the other hand, have offered the believability of being able to sync the mouth positions with dialogue, but at the expense of the photorealism." VisionArt had developed a reputation for "pushing the envelope" with CGI and morphing techniques, and the producers of Northern Exposure were "ecstatic" with the results. The 2D animation approach used a specially customized version of Elastic Reality, a morphing software that VisionArt had agreed to co-develop with ASDG in exchange for not developing their system in-house and having a site license in perpetuity, with a six-month exclusive on features contributed by VisionArt. Paul Miller, the lead developer for the Silicon Graphics version of Elastic Reality, provided Fay with new features on the afternoon that he requested them, allowing for rapid innovation of a first-of-a-kind approach on an episodic television schedule. Elastic Reality was later sold to Avid Technology.

== Independence Day (1996) ==
VisionArt created many of the air attack shots, including this one which features a team of F-18's firing on a Destroyer. Digital models were created for the F-18's, AMRAAM missiles, missile trails and the wonderful effect of the Destroyer's shields repelling the incoming missiles.

VisionArt's claim to fame on the big screen was arguably its creation of key effects scenes, such as the majority of the dogfight sequences for Independence Day, which won the Academy Award for Best Visual Effects. Sparky, an agentic dynamics simulation software developed by Rob Bredow, director of research and development, along with Pete Shinners, was heavily expanded to provide for near-real-time animation of large groups of F-18 jet fighters, alien attackers, missiles, smoke trailers, shields, etc. Unlike previous animation systems, Sparky's agentic approach allowed VisionArt to define the characteristics of agents such as F-18's or Alien Attacks, and elements such as missiles and shields, and then have them autonomously dogfight each other without any keyframes, graphs or other forms of traditional animation, an approach that would later be adopted by Massive for the Ork armies in Lord of the Rings. While previous shots of similar complexity animated by traditional means had taken about one month each, Sparky was also able to render the frames in hardware anti-aliased at film resolution at just one minute per frame, allowing the delivery of two shots per day.

While traditional animation was effective when a handful of aircraft was involved, digital effects supervisor Tricia Ashford noted that the technique would be "too laborious for the frenetic dogfight that concludes Independence Day." "The final air battle takes place around a fifteen-mile-wide destroyer," remarked Ashford, "and Roland wanted to see hundreds of F-18s and attackers duking it out with missiles, light balls, and tracer fire. It was an enormous challenge; the only way it could be accomplished was through an advanced procedural system that could automatically calculate and render the interaction between all these different elements." VisionArt demonstrated such a system to Roland Emmerich and his team, who loved it. "VisionArt had a tremendous system to begin with," stated Ashford, "and then they were able to adapt it to meet the needs of our show." In a 1996 interview for SIGGRAPH, writer Dean Devlin stated "When we were shown the software that was developed at VIsionArt, where we could just slide a little bar and add more F-18's and more alien attackers... the ease in which were able to create these shots, and the flexibility – I don't think that we could have done these sequences without it."

Through a dynamics-based simulation approach that allowed autonomous agents to interact based on a set of parameters for a given scene, Sparky was able "to simulate the behavioral characteristics of an aerial dogfight involving hundreds of planes and attackers." Initially, the US Navy was open to providing data on the flight characteristics of the F-18, but the Pentagon wanted Emmerich to strike all reference to Area 51 from the film. Given the centrality of Area 51 to UFO folklore, Emmerich refused. Fortunately, the Royal Australian Air Force had no qualms about references to Area 51, and happily provided the needed data. Director Roland Emmerich and writer Dean Devlin then provided the equivalent fictional characteristics for the alien attackers. "Once the capabilities of the planes and alien attackers were established, Bredow and software engineers Randi Stern and Brian Hall developed a range of prioritized objectives for each. an F-18, for example, might have the objective of attacking the destroyer, unless an alien attacker entered a zone that triggered evasive action." Rules were also established so that planes and attackers would bank away from and keep clear of the 3D space that would be occupied by the destroyer once it was composited into the shot. In the end, Independence Day shattered box office records, grossing over US$817 million worldwide, and won the 1996 Academy Award for Best Visual Effects.

== Godzilla (1998) ==
VisionArt's sister company FutureLight, headed by Rob Bredow (who later became the head of Industrial Light & Magic), created the first real-time tetherless optical motion capture (mocap) system in the industry. FutureLight's mocap was used by VisionArt to allow director Roland Emerich to conceptualize the hero CG character for 1998's Godzilla. It was also used in conjunction with Sparky for a number of key "Baby 'Zilla" shots, including up to 885 babies. According to Post Magazine, by 1998 "Sparky" had advanced to the point where some were calling it early artificial intelligence (a term VisionArt's technical leadership rejected), "With those kinds of numbers, key frame animation was impossible, so VisionArt's Rob Bredow, Brian Hall and Pete Shinners developed sophisticated flocking software that the babies a kind of artificial intelligence. With their flocking software, the babies had a set of animations to choose from, knew their environment, and knew parameters for moving." This process also involved the ability for Sparky agents to blend together disparate motion capture animation sets to create fluid autonomous movement, avoiding both obstacles within their environment and collisions with each other: "It's complicated, because they have a lot of body parts for their animation and the only way some animations can happen is if they blend two animations, like stepping forward and to the side."

The visual effects for Godzilla were particularly notable in that it was the first major feature film to employ CG animation integrated into a large volume of handheld camera footage, accounting for roughly 80% of the film's 400 visual effects shots. VisionArt employed a Zeiss Rec Elta RL-S reflectorless laser survey head (SN 702706-0000.720 217012) to obtain precise on-set 3-D measurements for the large scale street scenes such as those filmed in Manhattan, then coupled that data with "Tracky," a custom developed 2D to 3D camera tracking software by FutureLight which allowed CG characters and debris to be seamlessly integrated into the erratic hand-held camera shots. VisionArt completed 135 of the film's visual effects shots in-house, nearly one-third of the total, and provided the camera tracking to Centropolis Effects, Sony Pictures Imageworks, Digiscope and Pixel Liberation Front, which created the remainder of the shots.

== Dr. Dolittle (1998) ==
VisionArt created 80 talking animal shorts for the 1998's Dr. Dolittle, most of which involved blending 3D elements integrated with 2D animation of the live-action animal, involving everything from muzzle replacement to full head replacement on a given animal actor. VisionArt believed that key to creating successful talking animals was keeping a real animal's eyes, even when much of the animal's face was CG: "The eyes are so much of what brings them to life," said Josh Rose, executive vice president of VisionArt, adding "On many of the close-up shots of Rodney the guinea pig, we ended up doing muzzle replacements; almost two-thirds of his head was 3-D, but we kept his real eyes. For the cat, the real eyes were also kept — the computer graphics feathered off about half an inch all the way around the mouth. The only animals we did CG eyes for were the sheep, because they were chewing so much and their entire bodies moved. We had to replace large enough portions of them so you wouldn't see our CG animation sliding over their real bodies." "I had reservations about getting into 3-D because I'd never seen it done successfully with living characters," recalls Jon Farhat, the film's vfx supervisor, "We didn't want overanimation. we wanted very subtle, precise movements – like our animals were impeccably trained." VisionArt's Ted Fay had come up with an approach that included developing a process to turn 3D wireframe animation into animated 2D Elastic Reality shapes, so that the 3D mouth area could be seamlessly blended into the animals live-action face, while also allowing for additional animation and enhancement of the animal's eyebrow expressions.

One of VisionArt's most challenging creations was a Spanish-speaking orangutan. Rose recalls, "Jon Farhat tended to find out what Betty and the producers were most excited about at the time, and then just embellish it. They were loving the orangutan, so Jon came in and grilled us really hard on that. Betty really wanted to see the sensitivity and the specularity and the rolloff of the light on those big, wet lips. The orangutan's whole muzzle area and the meaty part of his mouth were all 3-D. Stirling Duguid, our 3-D animation supervisor, built in all of these really insane little details — the crevices and wrinkles in the skin — and then added really big, sweeping meaty lips and a big tongue. He got a lot of articulation in there. There was a desire to give the orangutan a stoned, Cheech and Chong-style appearance, so Ted Fay, our 2-D supervisor, created that heavy-lidded look by warping his expressive eyes using Avid's Elastic Reality. In the end, it came out looking great." Other artists involved were Jon-Marc Kortsch, Chad Carlberg, Todd Boyce, Bethany Berndt-Shackelford, Kristen Branan, Mike Bray, Richard Cook, Shellaine Corwel, Robert D. Crotty, John Campuzano, Archie Donato, Christina Drahos, Chris Greenberg, Dorene Haver, Hillary Hoggard (Covey), Jimmy Jewell, Anne Putnam Kolbe, Daniel Kramer, John Lafauce, Toan-Vinh Le, Jim 'Big Dog' McLean, Daniel Naulin, Jeremy Nelligan, John Peel, Joshua D. Rose, Barry Safley, and Jeremy Squires.

== "Transparent" visual effects ==
In addition to being known for science fiction work like Independence Day, Star Trek, and Godzilla, VisionArt specialized in "transparent" effects: removing, replacing, or modifying a wide range of objects in a scene to help tell the story, fix a mistake, or recreate worlds that no longer exist or never did.

== Closure ==
VisionArt closed their doors in 2000, selling most of their assets to Digital Art Media. Many of the key staff moved to Sony Pictures Imageworks, Industrial Light & Magic, Digital Domain, and other VFX facilities.

== VisionArt selected filmography ==
- Star Trek: Deep Space Nine (1993)
- Star Trek: The Next Generation (1993)
- Lois & Clark: The New Adventures of Superman (1993)
- Northern Exposure (1993)
- Galaxy Beat (1994)
- Attack of the 5 Ft. 2 In. Women (1994)
- M.A.N.T.I.S. (1994)
- The Paper (1994)
- Goldilocks and the Three Bears (1995)
- Star Trek: Voyager (1995)
- Virtuosity (1995)
- Executive Decision (1995)
- Independence Day (1996)
- Alaska (1996)
- Jingle All the Way (1996)
- Star Trek: First Contact (1996)
- Jingle All the Way (1996)
- Daylight (1996)
- Men in Black (1997)
- McHale's Navy (1997)
- Stargate SG-1 (1997)
- Godzilla (1998)
- Dr. Dolittle (1998)
- Virus (1999)
- The General's Daughter (1999)
- Mystery Men (1999)
- Baby Geniuses (1999)
- Deep Blue Sea (1999)
- The Omega Code (1999)
- House on Haunted Hill (1999)
- Anna and the King (1999)
- Nutty Professor II: The Klumps (2000)
- Little Nicky (2000)
