= Dominic Tuohy =

English special effects artist

- Occupation: Special effects artist

Dominic Tuohy is an English special effects artist. He won an Academy Award for Best Visual Effects for his work on 1917, and has been nominated for three more for the films Solo: A Star Wars Story and Star Wars: The Rise of Skywalker and The Batman.

== Selected filmography ==
- Solo: A Star Wars Story (2018; co-nominated with Rob Bredow, Patrick Tubach and Neal Scanlan)
- Star Wars: The Rise of Skywalker (2019; co-nominated with Roger Guyett, Neal Scanlan and Patrick Tubach)
- 1917 (2019; co-won with Guillaume Rocheron and Greg Butler)
- The Batman (2022; co-nominated with Dan Lemmon, Russell Earl and Anders Langlands)
