= Dee Tails =

English rapper, dancer and actor

- Occupations: Actor, creature performer, rapper, dancer
- Years active: 1995–present
- Known for: MN8; Star Wars sequel trilogy; Star Wars anthology films

Dee Tails is an English rapper, dancer and actor/creature performer best known for his work in the British boy band MN8 and the movies Star Wars: The Force Awakens, Rogue One, Star Wars: The Last Jedi and Solo: A Star Wars Story.

== Career ==
Tails started his career as a member of the R&B group MN8 where he achieved 7 top 25 hit singles in the UK and international success in France, Australia, New Zealand and the US. Their first single, "I've Got a Little Something for You", was used on the Bad Boys soundtrack and was notably one of the first ever remixes by P.Diddy for his Bad Boy label. MN8 also supported Janet Jackson on the European leg of her tour in 1995.

After MN8, Tails focused on his acting career where he did theatre work for many years playing Tommy the Cat in Dick Whittington, quoted by The Stage as a "a real standout performance". He also had a role in Batman Begins as a Gotham City Police Officer in 2005. In 2013, he appeared in the film Captain Phillips as a UKMTO Operator. In 2015, he appeared in four episodes of Jekyll & Hyde for ITV where he played The Harbinger with Richard E. Grant.

In 2004, he appeared as a mystery guest on the identity parade in Never Mind the Buzzcocks.

Tails had as a leading role in a Nescafe commercial in 2011, filmed in South Africa which showed Tails with a piano in the commercial.

In 2015, Tails landed the role of Cratinus in Star Wars: The Force Awakens. He then went on to perform as the character L-1 (also known as K-Ohn) in Rogue One: A Star Wars Story in 2016. In 2017, he played the role of Slowen Lo in Star Wars: The Last Jedi voiced by Joseph Gordon-Levitt. In 2018, Tails played Quay Tolsite in the film Solo: A Star Wars Story.

== Filmography ==
Year	Title	Role
2005	Batman Begins	Gotham City Police Officer
2009	Barry Brown	Jules
2013	Captain Phillips	UKMTO Operator
2015	Art Ache	Squid
2015	Jekyll & Hyde	The Harbinger
2015	Star Wars: The Force Awakens	Cratinus
2016	Rogue One: A Star Wars Story	L-1 (K-Ohn)
2017	Star Wars: The Last Jedi	Slowen Lo
2018	The Round Table	Dee Tails
2018	Solo: A Star Wars Story	Quay Tolsite
