= Tuff Act to Follow =

Single by MN8

from the album Freaky
- B-side: "Magic Ride"
- Released: August 19, 1996
- Genre: R&B; new jack swing
- Length: 3:39
- Label: Columbia
- Songwriters: Climie; Noel; George
- Producer: Simon Climie

MN8 singles chronology
"Pathway to the Moon" (1996)	"Tuff Act to Follow" (1996)	"Dreaming" (1996)

Music video
- "Tuff Act to Follow" on YouTube

"Tuff Act to Follow" is a song by British R&B group MN8. It was released in August 1996, by Columbia Records, as the lead single from their second album, Freaky (1996). The song peaked at number 15 on the UK Singles Chart and at number 43 in France.

== Track listings ==
- CD 1 / 12"
1. "Tuff Act To Follow" (Radio Mix) — 3:43
2. "Tuff Act To Follow" (Silk & Doc's Tuff Mix) — 5:02
3. "Tuff Act To Follow" (Silk's House Mix) — 8:01
4. "Tuff Act To Follow" (Best Kept Secret Mix) — 3:53
5. "Tuff Act To Follow" (M. Doc's Mix) — 3:42
- CD 2
1. "Tuff Act To Follow" (Radio Mix) — 3:43
2. "Magic Ride" — 4:34
3. "I Promise" — 3:56
4. "Tuff Act To Follow" (Album version) — 3:41
- Cassette single
1. "Tuff Act To Follow" (Radio Mix) — 3:43
2. "Magic Ride" — 4:34

== Charts ==
Chart (1996)	Peak position
Estonia (Eesti Top 20)	16
Europe (Eurochart Hot 100)	95
Europe (European Hit Radio)	38
France (SNEP)	43
France Airplay (SNEP)	35
Netherlands (Dutch Top 40 Tipparade)	13
Netherlands (Dutch Single Tip)	4
Scotland (OCC)	27
UK Singles (OCC)	15
UK Airplay (Music Week)	19
UK Hip Hop/R&B (Official Charts)	3
