= Freaky (album) =

Studio album by MN8
- Released: 4 November 1996
- Recorded: 1996
- Genre: R&B; pop; new jack swing
- Length: 53:41
- Label: Columbia
- Producer: MN8; Dennis Charles & Ronnie Wilson; Simon Climie; Mark Lewis; Dave James; Howard Francis; Bump & Grind; Peter Ibsen

MN8 chronology
To the Next Level (1995)	Freaky (1996)

Singles from Freaky
- 1. "Tuff Act to Follow" Released: 19 August 1996; 2. "Dreaming" Released: 14 October 1996

Professional ratings
Review scores
Source	Rating
Music Week	4/5 stars

Freaky is the second studio album by English R&B group, MN8. It was released in 1996 by Columbia Records. The album includes the singles, "Tuff Act to Follow" and "Dreaming".

== Track listing ==
1. "Tuff Act to Follow" (3:43)
2. "Dreaming" (5:07)
3. "Freaky" (3:59)
4. "I'll Give You My Everything" (4:04)
5. "Baby, I Surrender" (5:05)
6. "Beautiful Body" (4:41)
7. "It's All On You" (5:19)
8. "Shake It" (4:57)
9. "This Heart" (3:59)
10. "I Promise" (3:56)
11. "Keep It in the Family" (4:20)
12. "Talk to You" (4:38)
