= Rob Bredow =

American VFX artist (born 1974)

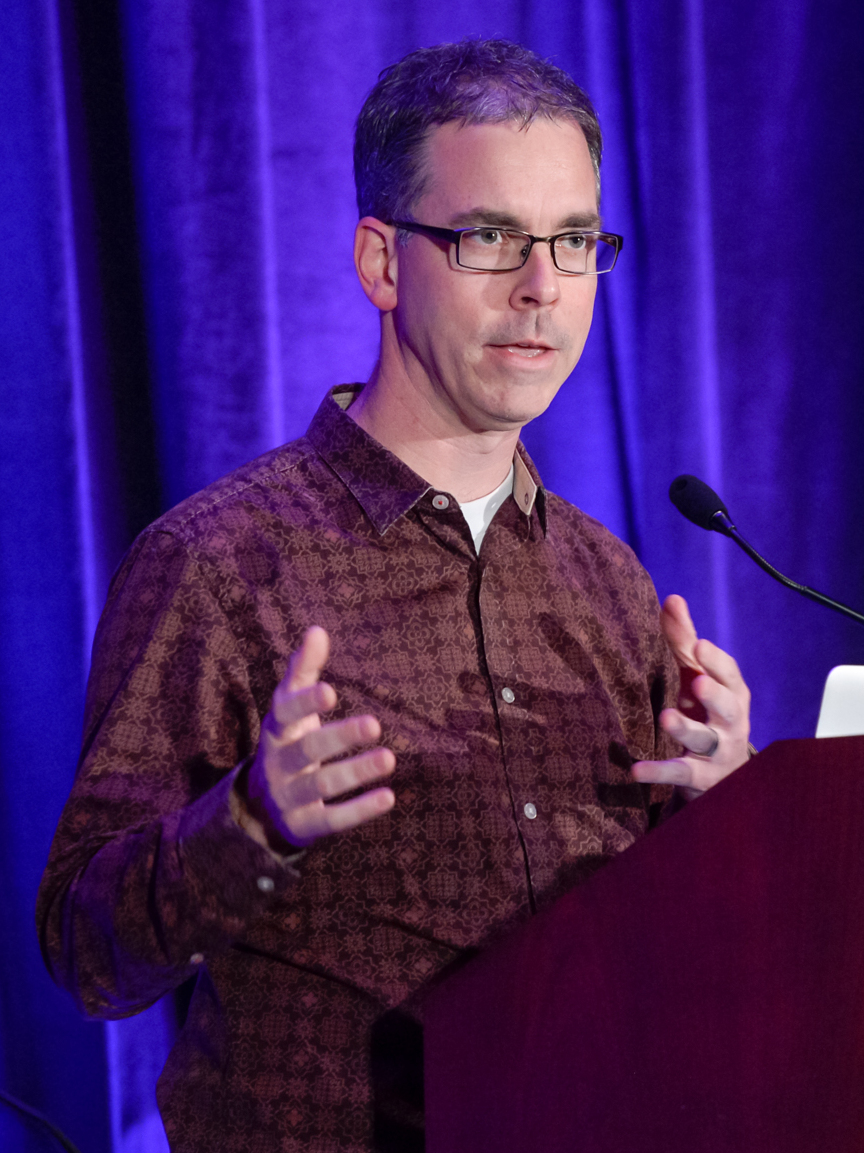
- Bredow in 2016
- Born: March 22, 1974 (age 51); Orange County, California, U.S.
- Occupation: Visual effects artist
- Children: 2

Robert D. Bredow (born March 22, 1974) is an American visual effects artist. He was nominated for an Academy Award in the category Best Visual Effects for the film Solo: A Star Wars Story.

== Selected filmography ==
- Solo: A Star Wars Story (2018; co-nominated with Patrick Tubach, Neal Scanlan and Dominic Tuohy)
