= Solo: A Star Wars Story =

2018 film by Ron Howard

- Theatrical release poster
- Directed by: Ron Howard (Note: Phil Lord and Christopher Miller, the film's original directors, were fired from the film in June 2017 after months of shooting, and about three-quarters through principal photography. Howard took over directing duties for the remaining weeks of scheduled principal photography and reshoots. The duo opted to receive credit as executive producers.)
- Written by: Jonathan Kasdan; Lawrence Kasdan
- Based on: Characters by George Lucas
- Produced by: Kathleen Kennedy; Allison Shearmur; Simon Emanuel
- Starring: Alden Ehrenreich; Woody Harrelson; Emilia Clarke; Donald Glover; Thandiwe Newton (Note: Credited as "Thandie Newton".); Phoebe Waller-Bridge; Joonas Suotamo; Paul Bettany
- Cinematography: Bradford Young
- Edited by: Pietro Scalia (Note: Chris Dickens, the film's original editor, was replaced by Scalia in May 2017 during principal photography.)
- Music by: John Powell; John Williams (Note: Williams composed the Han Solo theme and original Star Wars music.)
- Production company: Lucasfilm Ltd.
- Distributed by: Walt Disney Studios Motion Pictures
- Release dates: May 10, 2018 (Los Angeles); May 25, 2018 (United States)
- Running time: 135 minutes
- Country: United States
- Language: English
- Budget: $365.7 million (gross); $299.8 million (net)
- Box office: $393 million

Solo: A Star Wars Story is a 2018 American space Western film directed by Ron Howard and written by Jonathan and Lawrence Kasdan. Produced by Lucasfilm Ltd., and distributed by Walt Disney Studios Motion Pictures, it is the second Star Wars anthology film, following Rogue One (2016). The film stars Alden Ehrenreich as Han Solo, with Woody Harrelson, Emilia Clarke, Donald Glover, Thandiwe Newton, Phoebe Waller-Bridge, Joonas Suotamo, and Paul Bettany in supporting roles. The film tells the origin story of Han Solo and Chewbacca, who join a heist within the criminal underworld ten years prior to the events of the first Star Wars film (1977).

George Lucas began developing a Han Solo prequel in 2012 and commissioned Lawrence Kasdan to write the screenplay. After Lucas sold Lucasfilm to The Walt Disney Company in 2012, Kasdan was hired to write The Force Awakens (2015), leaving his son Jonathan to complete the Solo script. Principal photography began in January 2017 at Pinewood Studios, with directors Phil Lord and Christopher Miller. Both were fired in June 2017 following creative differences with Lucasfilm, and Howard was hired as their replacement. Solo is one of the most expensive films ever made, with a budget of nearly $300 million.

Solo premiered in Los Angeles on May 10, 2018, and was released in North America on May 25. The film received mostly positive reviews from critics, who praised the cast (particularly Ehrenreich and Glover), visuals, score, and action sequences, but some criticized the storyline and screenplay. It was the first Star Wars film to be a box-office bomb, grossing $393 million worldwide. It received a nomination for Best Visual Effects at the 91st Academy Awards.

== Plot ==
On the planet Corellia, orphans Han and Qi'ra escape a local gang. They bribe an Imperial officer with stolen coaxium, a starship fuel, for passage on a transport, but Qi'ra is captured before she can board. Han vows to return for her and joins the Imperial Navy as a flight cadet, being given the surname "Solo".

Three years later, Han is serving as an infantryman on Mimban following his expulsion from the Imperial Flight Academy for insubordination. He encounters a trio of criminals posing as Imperial soldiers, led by Tobias Beckett. Han attempts to blackmail Beckett into letting him join the gang, but Beckett has him arrested and thrown into a pit to be fed to a Wookiee prisoner named Chewbacca. Able to understand Chewbacca's language, Han persuades him to cooperate to escape. Beckett, aware of the usefulness of a Wookiee's strength, rescues and enlists them in the gang to steal a shipment of coaxium on Vandor-1. The plan fails when the Cloud Riders, a band of space pirates led by Enfys Nest, arrive to hijack the shipment. The resulting chaos leads to the destruction of the coaxium and the deaths of Beckett's business and romantic partner Val, and their crewman Rio.

Beckett reveals that he was ordered to steal the shipment for Dryden Vos, a high-ranking crime boss in the Crimson Dawn syndicate. Han and Chewbacca volunteer to help him steal another shipment to repay the debt so that Dryden will not kill him. They travel to Dryden's yacht, where Han finds Qi'ra, who has joined Crimson Dawn as Dryden's top lieutenant. Han suggests a risky plan to steal unrefined coaxium from the mines on Kessel. Dryden approves but insists that Qi'ra accompany the team. She leads them to Lando Calrissian, a smuggler and pilot, who she hopes will lend them his ship, the Millennium Falcon. Han challenges Lando to a game of cards, with the wager being Lando's ship. Lando cheats to win but agrees to join the mission in exchange for a share of the profits.

After reaching Kessel in the Falcon and infiltrating the mine, Lando's droid co-pilot L3-37 instigates a slave revolt. They steal the coaxium, but L3 is fatally damaged in the confusion and Lando is wounded during the escape. With the help of L3's navigational data, uploaded into the ship's systems, Han pilots the ship through the dangerous and uncharted Kessel Run to elude an Imperial blockade. The Falcon, badly damaged, lands on the planet Savareen to process the coaxium.

Enfys arrives, having tracked the team from Vandor, and Lando leaves in the Falcon, deserting everyone else. Enfys reveals that she and her crew are rebels trying to strike back at the syndicates and the Empire. Han becomes sympathetic to their cause and tries to trick Dryden, who reveals Beckett has already alerted him to the double-cross. Dryden sends his guards to kill Enfys, but the Cloud Riders overpower them, leaving Dryden defenseless. Having anticipated Dryden's strategy, Han tries to take the coaxium, but Beckett betrays Dryden and escapes with it, taking Chewbacca hostage. Qi'ra kills Dryden and sends Han after Beckett. She contacts Dryden's superior, Maul, to inform him of the mission's failure, which she blames on Beckett. Maul orders Qi'ra to meet with him on Dathomir.

Han confronts Beckett and shoots him dead as the latter prepares to fire at him. Qi'ra leaves in Dryden's yacht, while Han and Chewbacca give the coaxium to Enfys, who offers Han a chance to join the rebellion against the Empire. He declines, and she gives him a vial of coaxium, enough to purchase a ship of his own.

Han and Chewbacca locate Lando and challenge him to a rematch, once again wagering the Falcon. This time Han wins after having stolen the hidden card that Lando used to cheat his way to victory the first time. Han and Chewbacca then leave for Tatooine to find the crime lord mentioned by Beckett who is putting together a big, profitable job.

== Cast ==
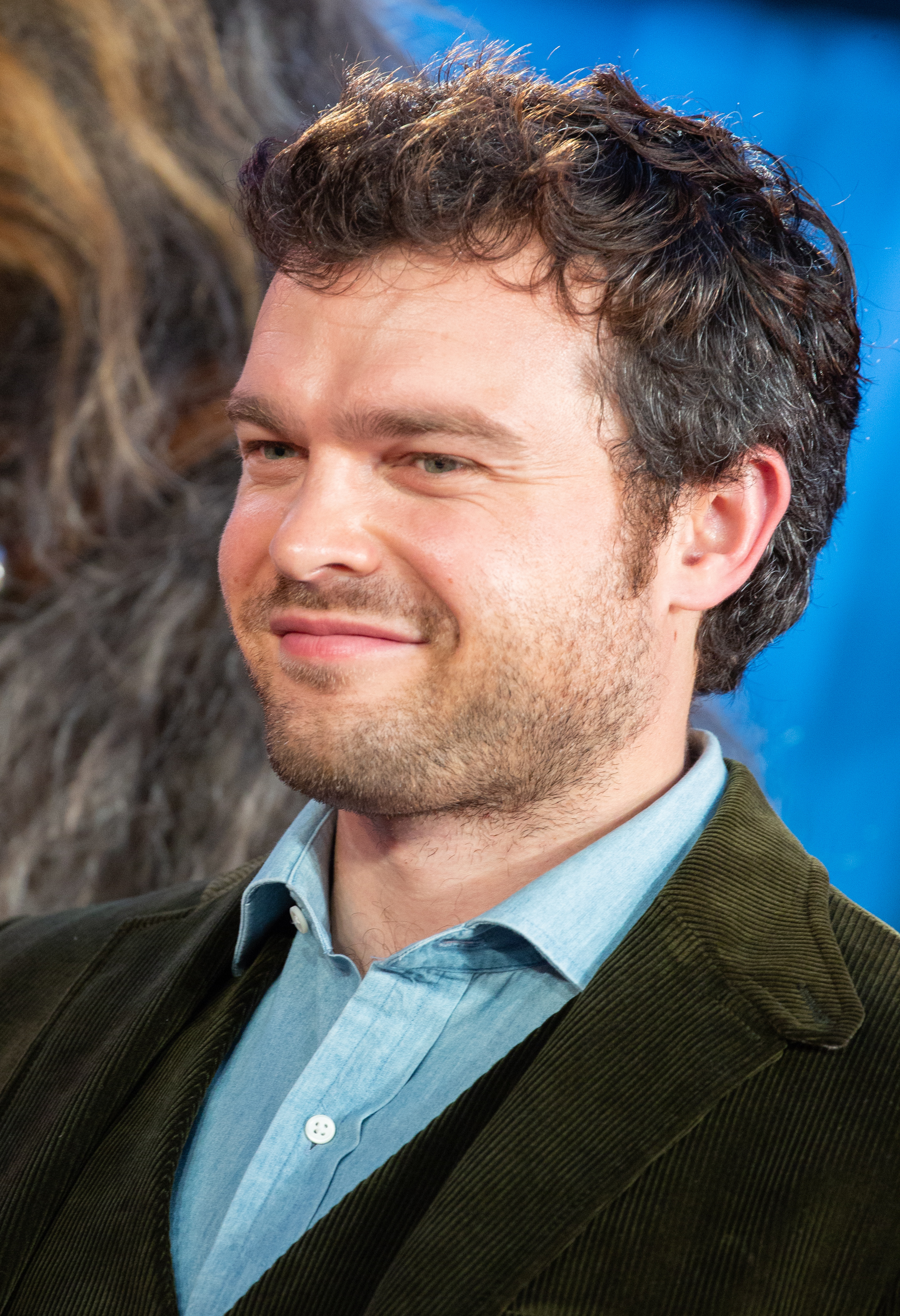
Alden Ehrenreich starred in the title role of Han Solo.

- Alden Ehrenreich as Han Solo: A cynical smuggler who joins Beckett's crew. When asked how Solo differs from Han's appearance in other Star Wars films, Ehrenreich stated, "I think the main thing that's different is that the Han we meet in this film is more of an idealist. He has certain dreams that he follows, and we watch how it affects him as those dreams meet new realities—realities that are harder and more challenging than he'd expected." Harrison Ford, who portrayed the character in previous films, met with Ehrenreich, giving him some insight and words of advice.
- Woody Harrelson as Tobias Beckett: A criminal and Han's mentor. The character of Beckett was based on Long John Silver from Treasure Island by Robert Louis Stevenson.
- Emilia Clarke as Qi'ra: Han's childhood friend and romantic interest. Describing her character, Clarke said: "She has a couple of guises, but essentially she is just fighting to stay alive. If you've got a really glamorous lady in a really sordid environment, you kind of know the glamor is hiding a few rough roads." With regard to her character's relationship with Solo, Clarke offered that "They grew up as comrades, essentially. They grew up as pals, as partners in crime. There is obviously the romantic side of things. But they grew up together. So they were kids together."
- Donald Glover as Lando Calrissian: A smuggler, gambler, and self-proclaimed sportsman on the rise in the galaxy's underworld. Billy Dee Williams, who portrayed the character in previous films, met with Glover, giving him some insight and words of advice.
- Thandiwe Newton as Val Beckett: Tobias Beckett's partner, a fellow criminal and member of his crew.
- Phoebe Waller-Bridge as the voice of L3-37: Lando's droid companion and navigator. When the character dies in the film, her consciousness and data are uploaded to the Millennium Falcon, which serves as a retcon of the previous Star Wars films, including The Empire Strikes Back, in which the starship is described as having "the most peculiar dialect". Screenwriter Jonathan Kasdan explained that this was done to give "the Falcon a personality that is fused with this amazing character played by Phoebe [which] I think does actually enrich the other movies".
- Joonas Suotamo as Chewbacca: a fierce Wookiee warrior. Suotamo reprises his role from The Force Awakens and The Last Jedi, in the former of which he acted as a body double for Peter Mayhew, who portrayed the character in previous films.
- Paul Bettany as Dryden Vos: A ruthless crime lord who has a history with Beckett. Michael K. Williams had originally been cast, but he was removed from the final film after being unable to return to set during the film's reshoots. Bettany was cast in his place, with the character being reworked from a motion-capture alien (described by Williams as half-mountain lion, half-human) to a scarred near-human alien lifeform.

Erin Kellyman appears as Enfys Nest, the leader of a gang of space pirates called Cloud Riders. Jon Favreau voices Rio Durant, a pilot on Beckett's crew, and Linda Hunt voices Lady Proxima, the serpent-like leader of the gang to which teenage Han and Qi'ra belong. Ian Kenny portrays Rebolt while Clint Howard portrays Ralakili. Additionally, Anthony Daniels cameos as Tak. Kiran Shah plays Karjj and Warwick Davis briefly reprises his role from The Phantom Menace as Weazel, a Cloud Rider. Ray Park reprises his role as Maul, with Sam Witwer providing the voice, reprising the role from The Clone Wars and Rebels animated TV series. Peter Serafinowicz, Maul's original voice actor in The Phantom Menace, was initially brought in and recorded Maul's dialogue, but his vocal performance was ultimately dropped in favor of Witwer's with the explanation that it was "better for the continuity". Dee Tails appears as Quay Tolsite, the director of the Pyke Syndicate's operations on Kessel.

Screenwriter Jonathan Kasdan and first assistant director Toby Hefferman portrayed Tag Greenley and Bink Otauna, respectively—two characters that first appeared in the Star Wars Legends comics published by Dark Horse Comics. The scene was not included in the finished film.

== Production ==
=== Development ===
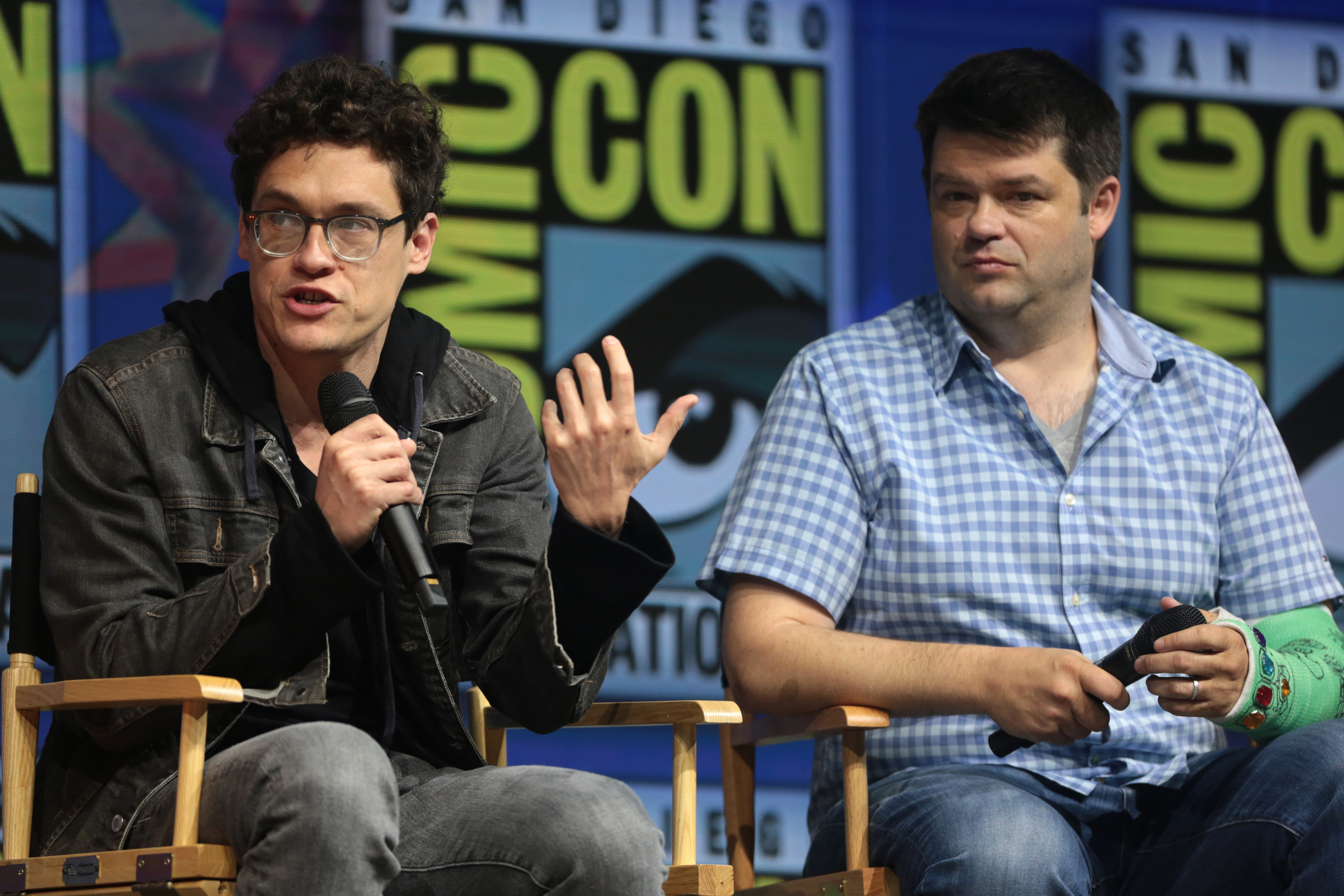
Phil Lord and Christopher Miller, the film's original directors, were hired in July 2015.

A first attempt at an appearance of Han Solo as a child was present during the pre-production of Star Wars: Episode III – Revenge of the Sith in 2002, showing an early draft of a young Solo that takes part in the battle on Kashyyyk. Later, a planned live-action TV series developed by Star Wars creator George Lucas titled Star Wars: Underworld would have depicted Han Solo's first meeting with Chewbacca and his winning the Millennium Falcon from Lando Calrissian. In 2012, about three weeks before Lucasfilm became a Disney property, Lawrence Kasdan had a meeting with Lucas and Kathleen Kennedy about relaunching the franchise and was presented with nine film ideas, devised and sketched by Lucas himself, which included the new sequel trilogy and various spin-offs. However, Kasdan wasn't sure if he wanted to make more movies even though the story about Han Solo was the one that inspired him the most, so Lucas commissioned him to write the screenplay. After Lucas sold his company to Disney in 2012, Kasdan was hired to help finish the script for Star Wars: The Force Awakens, leaving his son Jonathan Kasdan in charge of writing Solo until his return. Jon Kasdan cited the films Treasure Island (1950), Unforgiven (1992), Heat (1995), The Big Lebowski (1998) and Gangster No. 1 (2000) as influences when writing the screenplay. The film was internally codenamed "Harry and the Boy" and initially planned to follow The Force Awakens.

In February 2013, Disney CEO Bob Iger confirmed the development of two Star Wars standalone films, one written by Lawrence Kasdan. Shortly thereafter, it was reported that Disney was working on a film featuring Solo. Disney CFO Jay Rasulo described the standalone films as origin stories. In July, Lucasfilm announced that an anthology film focusing "on how [a] young Han Solo became the smuggler, thief, and scoundrel whom Luke Skywalker and Obi-Wan Kenobi first encountered in the cantina at Mos Eisley" would be released on May 25, 2018. The film was supposed to be released after The Force Awakens, but the temporary departure of Kasdan led to the first development of the spin-off Rogue One. The project was to be directed by Phil Lord and Christopher Miller from a script by Lawrence and Jonathan Kasdan. Kathleen Kennedy would serve as a producer, with Lawrence Kasdan and Jason McGatlin as executive producers; Allison Shearmur and Simon Emanuel also produce. Solo's Wookiee friend Chewbacca was also announced to appear in the film. In May 2016, Lawrence Kasdan stated that filming would start in January 2017.

=== Casting ===
In January 2016, a list of actors in consideration for the role of young Han Solo was revealed, including Emory Cohen, Scott Eastwood, Ansel Elgort, Dave Franco, Blake Jenner, Logan Lerman, Jack Reynor, and Miles Teller. In March 2016, it was reported that Taron Egerton, Alden Ehrenreich, and Reynor were on a shortlist for the role. In May 2016, Ehrenreich was reported to have been cast as the young Han Solo, and was confirmed for the role at Star Wars Celebration Europe III two months later. Miller and Lord wanted someone for the role who "presented as a pirate but had a big heart underneath". Miller called casting the role one of "the hardest casting challenges of all time," adding that they "saw over 3,000 people for the part", with actors to audition for the role including Charlie Cox, Tom Felton, Colton Haynes, Luke Hemsworth, Leo Howard, Anthony Ingruber, Cameron Monaghan, Landon Liboiron, Rami Malek, Jack O'Connell, Tony Oller, Glen Powell, Chandler Riggs, Nick Robinson, Joshua Sasse, Aaron Taylor-Johnson, Max Thieriot, and Ed Westwick. (Note: Attributed to multiple references:)

By the following October, Adria Arjona, Emilia Clarke, Kiersey Clemons, Jessica Henwick, Zoë Kravitz, Naomi Scott, and Tessa Thompson were being considered for the female lead, while Donald Glover was being considered to play a young Lando Calrissian. Glover was confirmed for Calrissian shortly after, with Clarke cast as the female lead the following month. Yahya Abdul Mateen II was a finalist for the role of Calrissian, while O'Shea Jackson Jr., Shameik Moore, Adande Thorne, and ASAP Rocky also auditioned for the role. (Note: Attributed to multiple references:)

In early January 2017, Woody Harrelson was revealed to be in negotiations to portray Han Solo's mentor, and was confirmed to be appearing in the film shortly after. Christian Bale had previously been in discussions for the role. A subsequent interview with Harrelson bolstered speculation that he may be specifically playing Legends character Garris Shrike, but Harrelson revealed the character's name as Beckett in March 2017. In February 2017, Phoebe Waller-Bridge joined the cast in an undisclosed role, said to be "a CGI-driven performance" similar to Alan Tudyk in Rogue One as the droid K-2SO. Additionally, it was reported that Thandiwe Newton was in negotiations to star in the film. Waller-Bridge and Newton were confirmed as part of the cast by the end of February, alongside the announcement that Joonas Suotamo would appear as Chewbacca, reprising the role from The Force Awakens and The Last Jedi, where he shared it with original Chewbacca actor Peter Mayhew. Michael K. Williams entered talks to join the film in early March 2017, and was confirmed shortly after, portraying a half-human, half-animal creature. By the end of the month, Ian Kenny had joined the cast. Warwick Davis was confirmed as part of the cast by the end of July 2017.

Peter Serafinowicz was set to reprise his voice role as Maul and had recorded dialogue during production at Pinewood Studios. He was later informed by Lucasfilm after the film's premiere that he had been replaced by Sam Witwer in order to maintain continuity with The Clone Wars and Rebels animated television series, in which Witwer voiced the character.

=== Filming ===
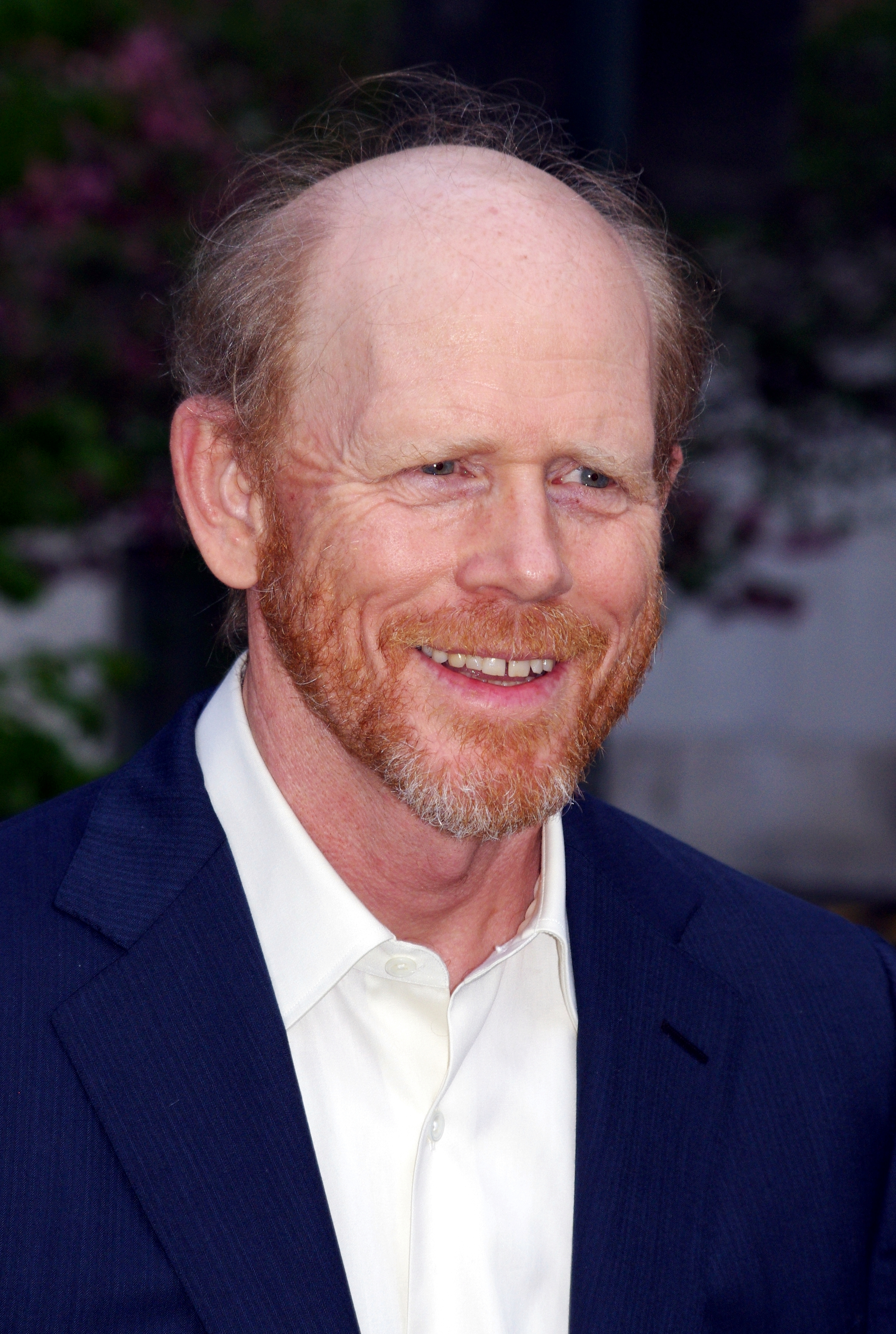
Ron Howard took over directing duties midway through production, reshooting 70% of the film.

Filming began on January 30, 2017, at Pinewood Studios, under the working title Star Wars: Red Cup. (Note: Solo Cup Company is famous for its red "party cups", which George Lucas has stated may have helped inspire the character's name.) By February 10, the film had spent $54.5 million on production. Lucasfilm announced that principal photography started on February 20, 2017. Bradford Young served as the cinematographer for the film. In May 2017, filming took place in Italy, with locations including Tre Cime di Lavaredo and Monte Piana in the Dolomites in Veneto, to the Fassa Dolomites in Trentino. Filming also took place in the Canary Islands that month.

On June 20, 2017, citing "creative differences", Lucasfilm announced that directors Lord and Miller had left the project with a new director "to be announced soon". It was reported that the directors were fired after Kennedy and Lawrence Kasdan disagreed with their shooting style; Lord and Miller believed they were hired to make a comedy film, while Lucasfilm was looking for the duo only to add "a comedic touch." Lucasfilm also felt the directors were encouraging too much improvisation from the actors, which was believed to be "shifting the story off-course" from the Kasdans' script. To appease Kasdan, who was unhappy with scenes not being filmed "word for word," Lord and Miller shot several takes exactly as written, then shot additional takes. Lord and Miller refused to compromise on certain scenes, such as filming a scene from fewer angles than Lucasfilm expected, thereby reducing the options available in editing. The duo were also unhappy when Lawrence Kasdan was brought to the London set, feeling he became a "shadow director". The decision to remove Lord and Miller was made after a short hiatus in filming taken to review the footage so far. The original film editor, Chris Dickens, was also removed from the film, replaced by Pietro Scalia.

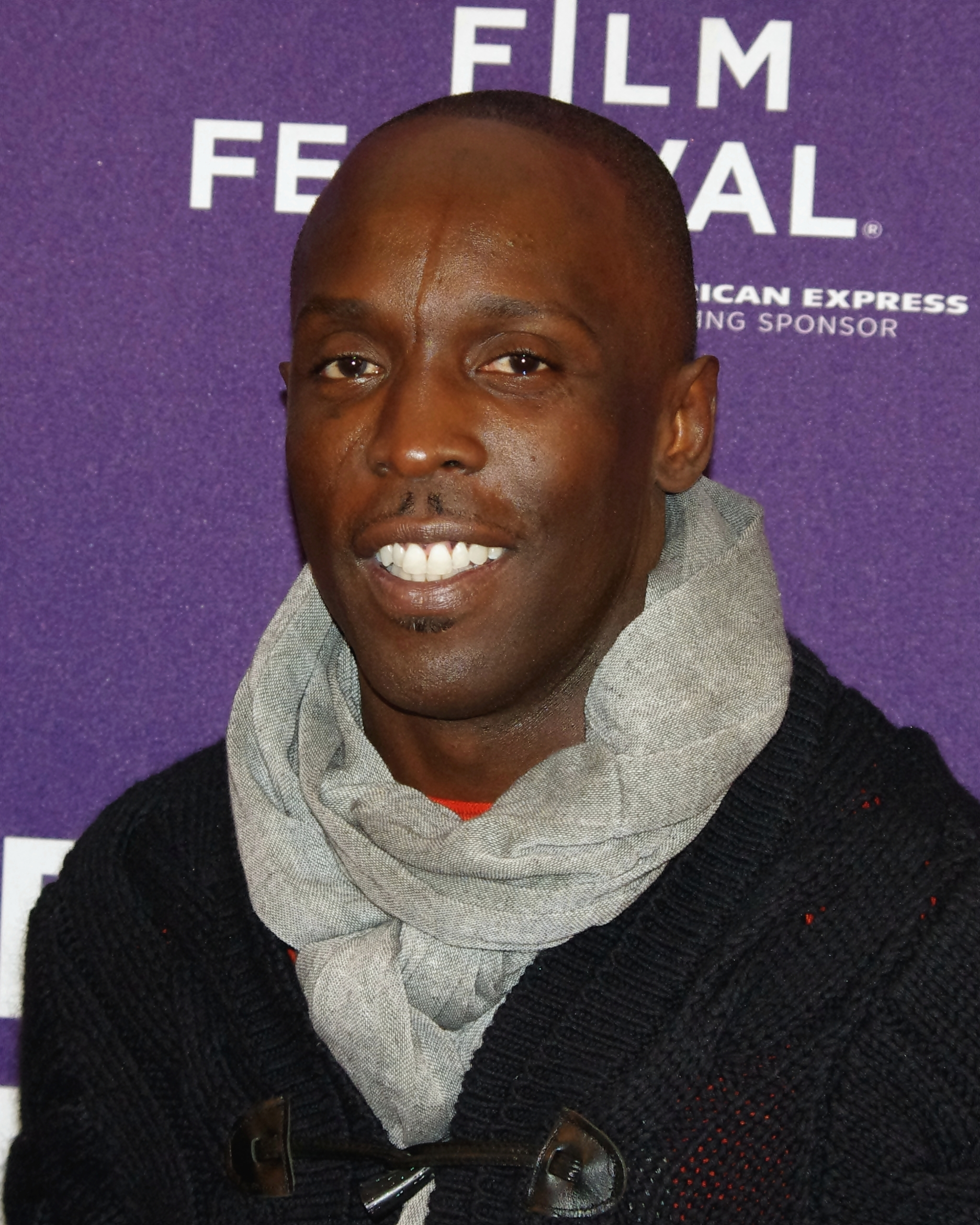
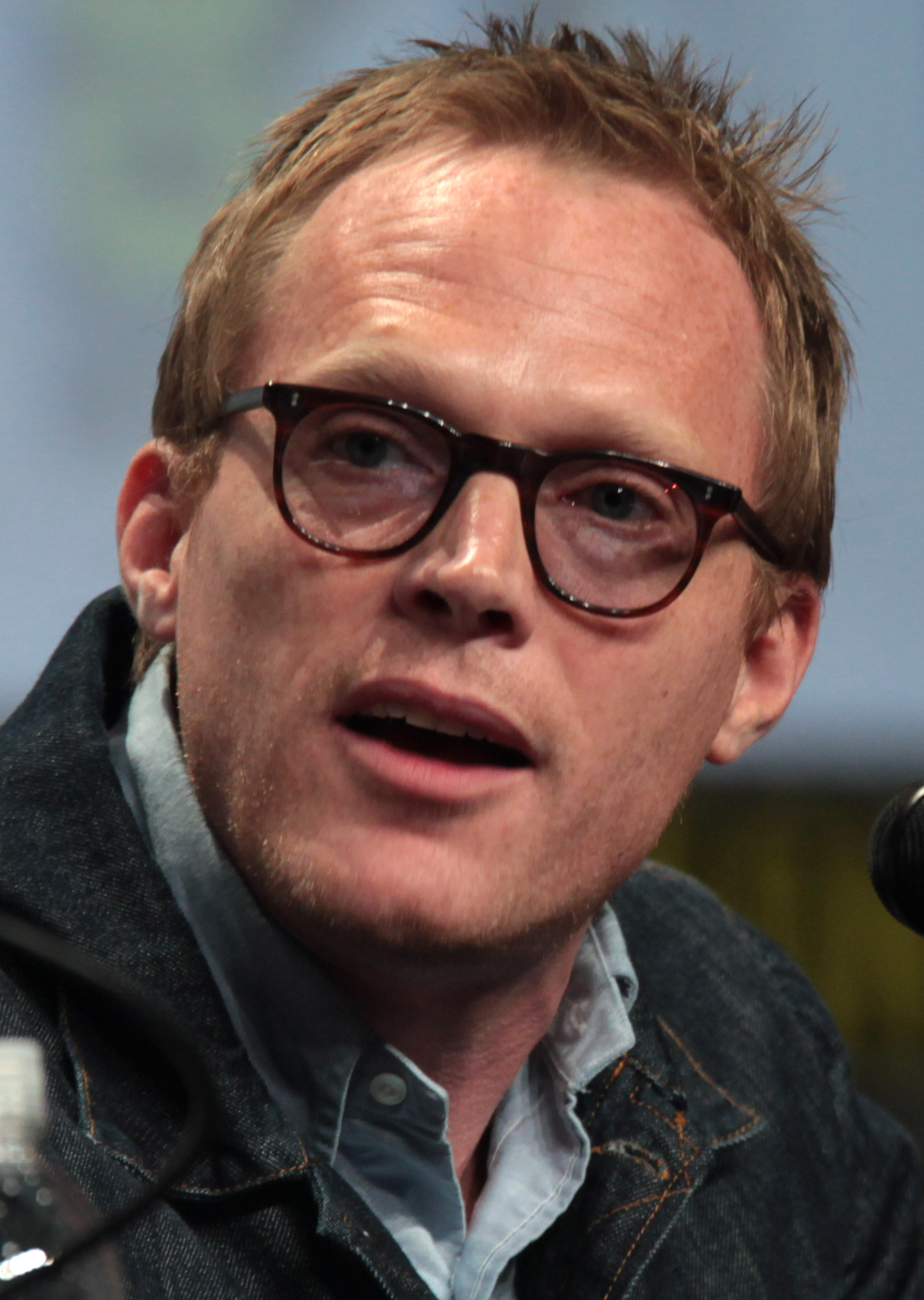
During reshoots, Michael K. Williams (left) was not able to return due to scheduling conflicts. Paul Bettany would be cast to replace Williams, and the character as a whole was redeveloped.

It was reported that Ron Howard, who had previously collaborated with Lucas as an actor in American Graffiti (1973) and the director of Willow (1988), was a frontrunner to step in as director. Howard had turned down an offer to direct Star Wars: Episode I – The Phantom Menace. Joe Johnston and Kasdan were also considered, though in regards to Kasdan, Directors Guild of America rules state that a replacement for a director may not be someone already involved in the production. Two days later, it was announced that Howard would take over directing for the remaining three and a half weeks of scheduled principal photography as well as the scheduled five weeks of reshoots. Lucas advised Howard for directing the film, "Just don't forget it. It's for 12-year olds". Howard wrote, "I'm beyond grateful to add my voice to the Star Wars universe... I hope to honor the great work already done and help deliver on the promise of a Han Solo film." Howard was expected to arrive in London on June 26 to complete filming. During the reshoots, actor Michael K. Williams was unable to return to the production, due to a schedule conflict with filming The Red Sea Diving Resort, resulting in his part being redeveloped and recast with Paul Bettany. Williams stated the reshoots for his character were "to match the new direction which the producers wanted Ron to carry the film in," and that he would not have been available again until November 2017; the production did not want to wait for his availability to make a release in May 2018. Bettany, who previously worked with Howard on A Beautiful Mind and The Da Vinci Code, had heard of the director's involvement with the film and texted him to inquire into joining the film. "Two weeks later I was flying to London to be in Star Wars," Bettany detailed in a May 2018 interview with The Los Angeles Times.

Lucas, Howard's friend, mentor and collaborator, made a surprise visit to the set to encourage Howard on his first day shooting. Intended as a short meeting, Lucas spent the whole day with the crew. While Lucas had not meant to interfere, at some point he forgot and asked, "Why doesn't Han just do this?"; Howard included his suggestion. On October 17, 2017, Howard announced that principal photography had been completed, and revealed the title of the film.

In March 2018, after it was reported Howard had reshot around 70% of the film, it was announced that Lord and Miller would not challenge for director credit and instead agreed to executive producer credits. The duo saw an early cut of Howard's film and provided him with their feedback. Post-production wrapped on April 22, 2018. According to the writers, the scene where Han shoots Beckett is a deliberate reference to a scene from the 1977 Star Wars, where the former shoots Greedo.

=== Visual effects ===
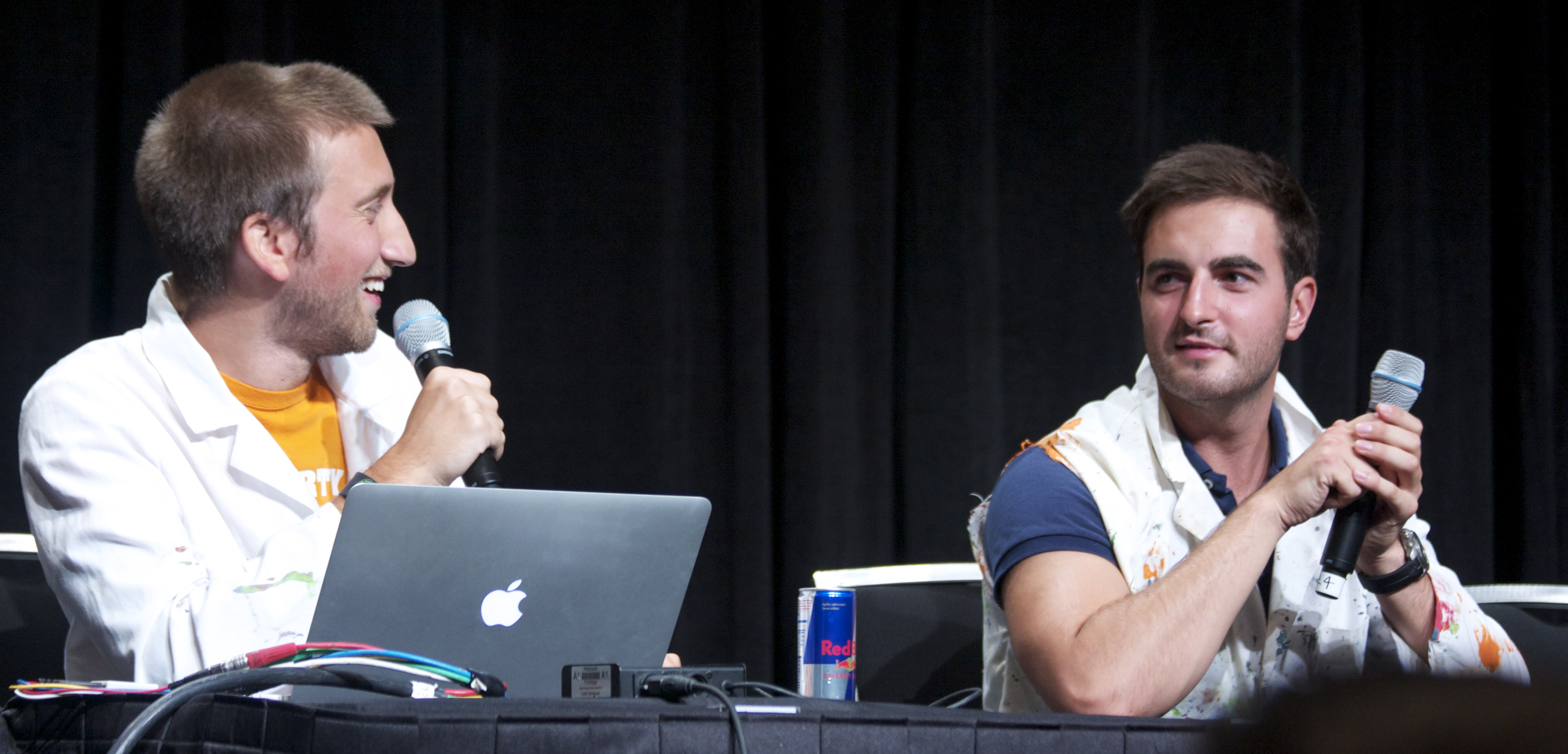
The Slow Mo Guys (Gavin Free and Daniel Gruchy) provided inspiration for the visual effects used to achieve the coaxium train heist.

The visual effects were provided by Industrial Light & Magic, Hybride and Blind LTD and Supervised by Nigel Sumner, Julian Foddy, Greg Kegel, Joseph Kasparian, Francois Lambert, Andrew Booth, Rob Bredow and Patrick Tubach with the help of Jellyfish Pictures, Raynault VFX, Lola VFX and Nvizage. Bredow described working on the train heist scene as a challenge. "I've always in my own life referenced the Star Wars films in terms of having the coolest explosions ever, you know, back to Joe Viskocil's explosions of the Death Star and the way those evolved over time. It was like, 'How am I going to do something that's different and unique in the Star Wars universe?". He would utilize miniature models and built a 3D model of the mountain in the film and blew it up with a variety of firecrackers within a large fish tank built at Pinewood. The team took inspiration from the YouTube channel The Slow Mo Guys, specifically a video of the creators Gavin Free and Daniel Gruchy conducting an experiment that saw them blowing up firecrackers in a fish tank to capture the explosion in slow motion.

Around 60 different designs of the Millennium Falcon were developed before the final version seen in the film was settled on. Taken into consideration by the design team was 1970s culture, examining muscle cars, as well as concept art drafted for the 1977 film. Lead designer James Clyne described adding an escape pod to the front of the ship as solving a curiosity he had as a boy as to why the Falcon had that design. Rear-projection visual effects, a technique used to combine foreground performances with pre-filmed backgrounds, were used for the Falcon cockpit scenes, an updated version of the technique used in the original trilogy. This allowed the actors to have a visual reference for the scene.

The creation of L3 was a combination of practical and visual effects. Actress Phoebe Waller-Bridge was present on set and wore a costume to perform her scenes, with post-production visual effects done to erase Waller-Bridge out of the footage and to add in interior pieces and wires.

Phil Tippett created the stop motion animation for the holochess scene, which included two characters that didn't make it to the 1977 movie.

=== Music ===
In July 2017, John Powell was announced as the main composer of the score. Longtime Star Wars composer John Williams composed and conducted the Han Solo theme, "The Adventures of Han", for the film. Powell began writing the music in late 2017 after finishing his work on Ferdinand. In December 2017, Williams wrote two musical pieces and combined them to create Han's theme. The following month, Williams recorded the demos with the Recording Arts Orchestra of Los Angeles at the Newman Scoring Stage. Powell interpolated Williams' new theme into his score, as well as incorporating music by Williams from previous Star Wars films, including the Star Wars main title, and several motifs and cues from A New Hope, The Empire Strikes Back, and The Phantom Menace. Walt Disney Records released the soundtrack album on May 25, 2018. In September 2020, Powell announced on social media that a deluxe edition of the soundtrack album would be remixed and mastered by 5 Cat Studios, featuring all unedited cues from the score and additional demos that Williams had composed for the film. The deluxe edition was released on November 20, 2020, featuring an additional 40 minutes of previously unreleased music. In December 2020, Mondo had publicly announced the release of the soundtrack on 180g vinyl and limited "hyperspace" vinyl, due for January 2021.

== Marketing ==
A "sneak peek" TV spot was released during Super Bowl LII on February 4, 2018. It became the most popular Super Bowl trailer on YouTube with 8 million views. It also had 5.9 million views on Facebook.

The first official teaser trailer was released on February 5, 2018. Graeme McMillan of The Hollywood Reporter criticized the trailer as "dull", and compared it negatively to the look of Rogue One, opining that the visuals "should be the hive of scum and villainy of the Cantina of the very first movie, filled with colorful aliens and things happening all over the place. That busyness, the sense of danger and hustle, feels appropriate for Solo in a way that what's on show in this first trailer simply doesn't." He also noted that several plot elements presented in the trailer were reminiscent of The Han Solo Trilogy, a series of novels published in 1997 and 1998.

In early March 2018, French artist Hachim Bahous asserted that Disney had plagiarized a series of album covers he designed for Sony Music's label Legacy Recordings in France with character posters for the film. Disney stated they were investigating the alleged plagiarism and that the Solo posters had been produced by an outside vendor.

== Release ==
=== Theatrical ===
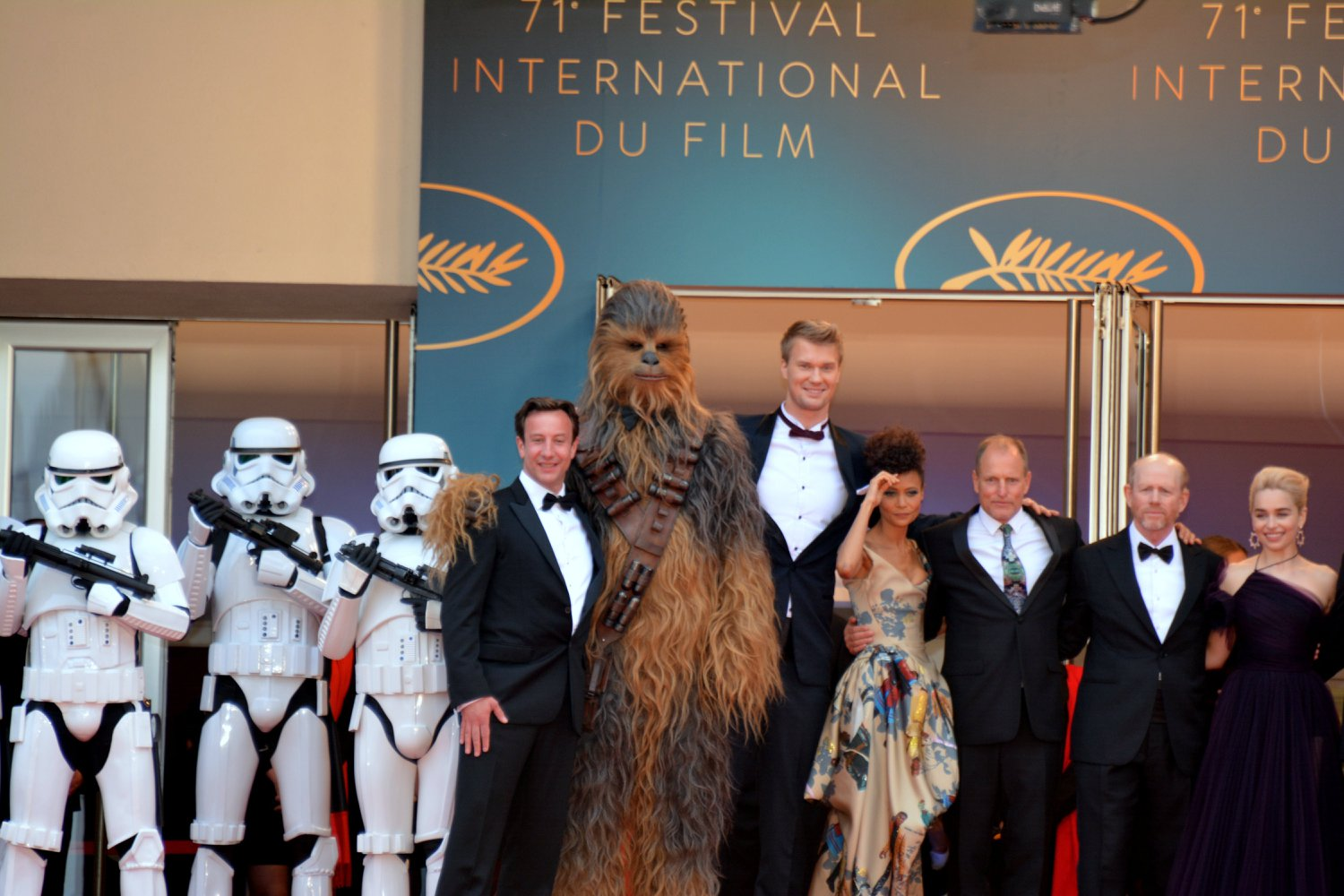
Cast, director and producer promoting the film at the 2018 Cannes Film Festival

Solo had its world premiere on May 10, 2018, at the El Capitan Theatre in Los Angeles, and also screened on May 15, 2018, at the 2018 Cannes Film Festival. The film was released in the United States on May 25, 2018.

=== Home media ===
Walt Disney Studios Home Entertainment released Solo: A Star Wars Story through digital download on September 14, 2018, and on Ultra HD Blu-ray, Blu-ray and DVD on September 25. Physical copies and Apple store contain behind-the-scenes featurettes, deleted scenes, and a roundtable featuring its cast and director.

== Reception ==
=== Box office ===
Solo: A Star Wars Story grossed $213.8 million in the United States and Canada, and $179.4 million in other territories, for a total worldwide gross of $393.2 million. With an estimated production budget of around $300 million, it was reported that the film needed to gross around $600 million worldwide to break even.

A week after its worldwide debut of just $147.5 million, Variety wrote that the film would lose Disney "tens of millions of dollars" off a projected final total gross of $400–450 million while The Hollywood Reporter estimated the losses would range from $50 to $80 million. In April 2019, Deadline Hollywood calculated the film lost the studio $76.9 million, when factoring together all expenses and revenues. In October 2024, Forbes reported for production alone, the pre-tax loss of the film is $65 million. A year later this figure was updated to a loss of $103.3 million.

In June 2018, in response to the film's commercial performance, director Ron Howard tweeted he was proud of the film, and sorry that fans were not turning out to see it in larger numbers, but was happy for those who had enjoyed it. The following year, Howard stated that online trolls were partially to blame for the film's underwhelming box-office performance.

==== United States and Canada ====
Initial projections three weeks before its release had the film grossing around $170 million over its four-day Memorial Day opening weekend. Deadline Hollywood noted that it was tracking higher than the previous Star Wars spin-off film, Rogue One (which debuted to $155 million), and had more interest from audiences than the likes of fellow blockbusters Spider-Man: Homecoming and Guardians of the Galaxy Vol. 2. After its first day of pre-sales, Fandango announced the film was the second-best seller of advance tickets in 2018, after Avengers: Infinity War. At the week of its release, projections had the film making $135–170 million over the four-day frame, with Disney predicting a $130–150 million debut.

The film opened in 4,381 theaters, the ninth-highest total ever, including 3,300 3D locations and 400 IMAX screens. It grossed $14.1 million from Thursday night previews, the lowest of the Disney Star Wars films but the best-ever for Memorial Day weekend, beating the $13.2 million made by Pirates of the Caribbean: At World's End (2007). Including Thursday previews, the film made $35.6 million on its first day, lowering weekend projections to $115 million. It grossed just $84.4 million in its opening weekend (and $103 million over the four–day weekend), far below projections and marking the lowest Star Wars debut since Attack of the Clones (2002), although it did set a new career-high opening for Howard. Deadline Hollywood compared the below-expectations opening to Justice League the previous November, and attributed it to fan negativity toward the concept and the behind-the-scenes problems, as well as competition from Deadpool 2 and Avengers: Infinity War. Many analysts and publications, including Deadline, The Atlantic, Entertainment Weekly and CNN, interpreted the low box office returns as a case of "Star Wars fatigue", since Solo was the fourth film of the series released in 29 months, and came just five months after The Last Jedi. Other analysts attributed the film's underperformance to lackluster marketing, as well as the divided fan reception to The Last Jedi. Solo dropped 65% in its second weekend to $29.4 million, the worst sophomore frame for any Star Wars film since the original trilogy. It dropped another 46% in its third weekend to $15.7 million, finishing second behind newcomer Ocean's 8, and $10 million in its fourth week, finishing fourth.

==== Other territories ====
Worldwide the film was expected to make $285–340 million in its opening weekend, including $150–170 million internationally. It opened in 43 markets on the Wednesday and Thursday prior to its US release and made a total of $11.4 million, including $3.3 million in China. It went on to open to just $65 million internationally and $147.5 million worldwide. It grossed $10.3 million in the United Kingdom, and also finished first in Australia ($5 million), Germany ($4.3 million), France ($3.9 million), Russia ($3.6 million), Spain ($2.6 million), Mexico ($2.5 million), Italy ($2.2 million) and Brazil ($1.3 million). Despite being the second-largest international opening, it made just $10.1 million in China, far below the other three Disney Star Wars films. The film held a better-than-expected 47% in its second weekend, making $30.3 million from 54 countries and remaining the top film in several, including Australia, Spain and the United Kingdom.

=== Critical response ===
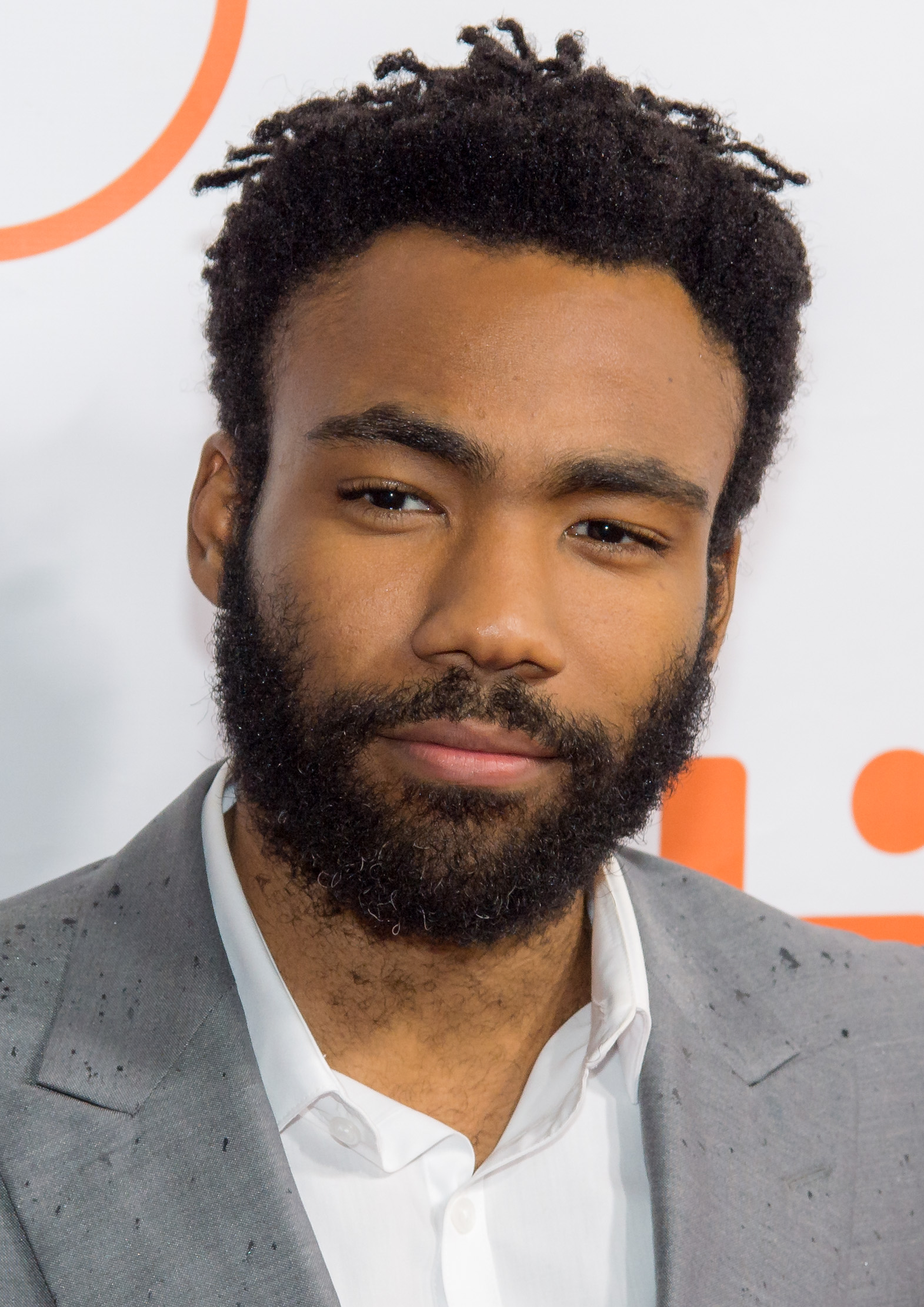
Donald Glover's performance as Lando Calrissian was praised by critics.

On review aggregation website Rotten Tomatoes, Solo has an approval rating of 69% based on 489 reviews, with an average rating of 6.4/10. The site's critical consensus reads, "A flawed yet fun and fast-paced space adventure, Solo: A Star Wars Story should satisfy newcomers to the saga as well as longtime fans who check their expectations at the theater door." On Metacritic, the film has a weighted average score of 62 out of 100, based on 54 critics, indicating "generally favorable reviews". Audiences polled by CinemaScore gave the film an average grade of "A−" on an A+ to F scale, while PostTrak reported that 89% of filmgoers gave it positive score, with 73% saying they would recommend it.

Writing for Rolling Stone, Peter Travers gave the film 2.5 stars out of 4, complimenting the cast but criticizing the lack of creativity, saying, "somehow Han Solo—the roguish Star Wars hellion famous for breaking all the rules—finds himself in a feel-good movie that doesn't break any." A. O. Scott of The New York Times said, "It doesn't take itself too seriously, but it also holds whatever irreverent, anarchic impulses it might possess in careful check." He noted that it is "a curiously low-stakes blockbuster, in effect a filmed Wikipedia page". Michael Rechtshaffen of The Hollywood Reporter praised the cast and production values but felt the film as a whole felt too safe, writing, "while Ehrenreich's Solo proves adept at maneuvering the Millennium Falcon out of some tight spots, the picture itself follows a safely predictable course. Missing here are the sort of plot-related or visual curveballs thrown by Rian Johnson's The Last Jedi or Gareth Edwards with Rogue One."

Particular praise was pointed towards Glover's performance as Lando Calrissian. USA Today asserted that Glover's Calrissian "outshone and outswaggered" the title character of Solo. TheWrap compared Glover to Cary Grant, proclaiming "Glover sweeps this film off its feet." While also praising the rest of the cast, Stephanie Zacharek of Time singled Glover out particularly, highlighting his "unruly, charismatic elegance."

Ron Howard said that original Han Solo actor Harrison Ford saw the film twice and spoke positively about it and Ehrenreich's performance. In a joint interview with Ehrenreich to promote the film, Ford called the film "spectacular" and said that he "couldn't be happier" with Ehrenreich's performance. Billy Dee Williams was more critical of the film, particularly due to the direction of Calrissian: "I think that the reason they didn't have the success they could have had, [is] because they were going for something that was topical, instead of an adventure that's far beyond those questions. If you're talking about this huge, incredible story, why lock yourself into this tiny moment between a character like Lando and his robot friend?" In other interviews, he complimented other aspects of the film, including Glover's perceptions of Lando's gender fluidity: "That kid is brilliant!" In a 2026 interview, Kathleen Kennedy said she regretted doing the film three years after Han Solo died in The Force Awakens.

=== Accolades ===
Award	Date of ceremony	Category	Recipient(s)	Result	Ref.
Golden Trailer Awards	May 31, 2018	Best Summer Blockbuster TV Spot	Walt Disney Studios	Won	
Teen Choice Awards	August 12, 2018	Choice Summer Movie	Solo: A Star Wars Story	Nominated	
Teen Choice Awards	August 12, 2018	Choice Summer Movie Actor	Alden Ehrenreich	Nominated	
Teen Choice Awards	August 12, 2018	Choice Summer Movie Actor	Donald Glover	Nominated	
Teen Choice Awards	August 12, 2018	Choice Summer Movie Actress	Emilia Clarke	Nominated	
Visual Effects Society Awards	February 5, 2019	Outstanding Visual Effects in a Photoreal Feature	Rob Bredow, Erin Dusseault, Matt Shumway, Patrick Tubach, Dominic Tuohy	Nominated	
Visual Effects Society Awards	February 5, 2019	Outstanding Created Environment in a Photoreal Feature	Julian Foddy, Christoph Ammann, Clement Gerard, Pontus Albrecht for "Vandor Planet"	Nominated	
Visual Effects Society Awards	February 5, 2019	Outstanding Model in a Photoreal or Animated Project	Masa Narita, Steve Walton, David Meny, James Clyne for "Millennium Falcon"	Nominated	
International Film Music Critics Association Awards	February 21, 2019	Film Music Composition of the Year	John Powell	Won	
Academy Awards	February 24, 2019	Best Visual Effects	Rob Bredow, Patrick Tubach, Neal Scanlan, and Dominic Tuohy	Nominated	
Saturn Awards	September 13, 2019	Best Science Fiction Film	Solo: A Star Wars Story	Nominated	
Grammy Awards	February 10, 2019	Best Instrumental Composition	John Powell, John Williams ("Mine Mission")	Nominated	

== Adaptations ==
A novelization by Mur Lafferty, Solo: A Star Wars Story: Expanded Edition (ISBN 978-0525619390) was published on September 4, 2018, by Del Rey Books. It includes scenes from alternate versions of the film's script, including scenes in which Qi'ra is brought back to Lady Proxima, Chewbacca uses some of Lando's "outrageously expensive" bathroom products, and in an epilogue, Enfys Nest delivers the coaxium to Saw Gerrera and Jyn Erso.

Additionally, a seven-issue comic book adaptation of the film was published by Marvel Comics starting in October 2018, written by Robbie Thompson and pencilled by Will Sliney.

== Future ==
Alden Ehrenreich confirmed his contract deal to appear as Han Solo extended for two additional films, giving the studio the option to pursue a sequel to Solo: A Star Wars Story, or feature him in other anthology films in a supporting capacity. Ehrenreich said he would like any sequels to differentiate themselves from the previous Star Wars trilogies by being standalone, in the vein of the Indiana Jones films, rather than direct follow-ups. Emilia Clarke, who played Qi'ra, also signed on for future installments.

Ron Howard said that while no sequel was in development, it was up to the fans to decide. Critics noted the film intentionally left room open for sequels. Solo writer Jon Kasdan said that he would include bounty hunter Bossk (who briefly appears in The Empire Strikes Back and is mentioned in Solo) if he were to write a sequel for the film. Kennedy also said that a film focusing on Lando Calrissian could happen, but was not a priority. Donald Glover also expressed interest in a spin-off film, saying he would imagine it as Catch Me If You Can in space.

On June 20, 2018, Collider claimed that all future anthology films were on hold due to the disappointing financial performance of Solo. A day later, Lucasfilm denied the rumors as "inaccurate" and confirmed that there are multiple unannounced films in development. Bob Iger has said that the production of new films would go on hiatus after 2019's The Rise of Skywalker, though none were cancelled.

On May 23, 2019, the hosts of The Resistance Broadcast encouraged fans on social media to use the hashtag #MakeSolo2Happen. The campaign was a mixture of celebrating the first movie and to spread awareness that a sequel is wanted. The campaign reached multiple people involved with the film, including Ron Howard. To express his gratitude, Jon Kasdan tweeted an image of three crime syndicate logos, hinting that future stories could still be in the works. Kasdan has hinted that a sequel could feature Jabba the Hutt, being an origin story of Solo partnering up with the character. (Note: The ending of Solo teases that a "big-shot gangster is putting together a crew" on Tatooine, which media outlets have reported is "clearly implied to be Jabba".) In March 2020, Kasdan tweeted that he did not "think anyone's pursuing a Solo sequel at the moment ... I think a feature, at this point, would be a tough sell."

On May 25, 2020, fans again used the hashtag #MakeSolo2Happen to show their appreciation for the film on its second anniversary. The hashtag went viral with fans arguing that the film deserved more praise and once again calls were made for a continuation of the story. A number of people tweeting with the hashtag expressed their desire to see more of Emilia Clarke's Qi'ra. Rita Dorsch of Comic Book Resources said that, by far, the most interesting part of Solo is Qi'ra's turn and that any follow-up film needs to focus on her. Writing for CinemaBlend, Dirk Libbey stated "it seems unlikely that the Solo 2 fans will get the movie they want. Of course, some don't actually need a theatrical follow-up. They would be happy with a Disney+ series that didn't even necessarily include Han Solo, but instead focused on the criminal organization being run by Qi'ra." A Marvel comic book crossover series features Qi'ra and Crimson Dawn after the events of The Empire Strikes Back, and an upcoming comic will feature Han, Chewbacca, and Greedo doing a job for Jabba the Hutt.

In December 2020, a Lando limited series was announced for Disney+, with a story by Justin Simien. In May 2022, Kennedy stated that the series was still in development and that they were having discussions with Glover about reprising the role.

In December 2022, Howard confirmed that Lucasfilm had no plans for a sequel to Solo. In September 2023, Stephen Glover revealed that their latest plans for Lando, before work was halted by the 2023 Writers Guild of America strike, was for it to be a feature film rather than a television series.
