= To the Next Level =

Studio album by MN8
- Released: 15 May 1995
- Recorded: 1993–1995
- Genre: R&B; pop; new jack swing
- Length: 48:40
- Label: Columbia
- Producer: Dennis Charles, Andy Whitmore & Ronnie Wilson; Ralph Daley

MN8 chronology
To the Next Level (1995)	Freaky (1996)

Singles from To the Next Level
- 1. "I've Got a Little Something for You" Released: 23 January 1995; 2. "If You Only Let Me In" Released: 17 April 1995; 3. "Happy" Released: 3 July 1995; 4. "Baby It's You" Released: 23 October 1995; 5. "Pathway to the Moon" Released: 12 February 1996

Professional ratings
Review scores
Source	Rating
AllMusic	3/5 stars
Cash Box	(favorable)
Entertainment Weekly	B−
NME	5/10
Smash Hits	3/5 stars

To the Next Level is the debut studio album by English R&B pop group MN8, released in May 1995 by Columbia Records. The album includes the single, "I've Got a Little Something for You".

== Singles ==
"I've Got a Little Something for You" was released as the band's debut single in January 1995. It peaked at number 2 on the UK Singles Chart, giving them their first top 10 single. A second single from the album, "If You Only Let Me In", was released in April 1995. This debuted, and peaked, at number 6. The third single, "Happy", was released in July 1995. It debuted, and peaked, at number 8. "Baby It's You" was released in October 1995 and peaked at number 22, with "Pathway to the Moon" as the final single released in February 1996 peaking at number 25.

== Track listing ==
No.	Title	Writer(s)	Length
1.	"I've Got a Little Something for You"	Mark Taylor	3:41
2.	"If You Only Let Me In"	Arthur Baker; Axel Kroell; Conner Reeves	4:26
3.	"Happy"	David Townsend; Bernard Jackson; David Conley	4:26
4.	"Pathway to the Moon"	Michael Puryear; Marcus Hummon; Ralph Daley	3:55
5.	"Lonely"	Ronnie Wilson; Dennis Charles	4:38
6.	"Baby It's You"	Tony Swain; Pam Sheyne	4:09
7.	"Black Pearl"	Phil Spector; Toni Wine; Irwin Levine	5:36
8.	"I'll Be Gone"	Wilson; Charles	4:31
9.	"Holding Hands"	Wilson; Charles	4:15
10.	"I Will Be There"	Wilson; Charles	4:14
11.	"Touch the Sky"	Kae Goldsmith; D. Rayside; Gary Douglas; T. Michaels	4:49

== Weekly charts ==
Chart (1995)	Peak position
Australian Albums (ARIA)	25
Belgian Albums (Ultratop Flanders)	43
Belgian Albums (Ultratop Wallonia)	20
Dutch Albums (Album Top 100)	50
European Albums Chart	61
French Albums (SNEP)	26
German Albums (Offizielle Top 100)	61
Irish Albums (IRMA)	18
New Zealand Albums (RMNZ)	46
Scottish Albums (OCC)	49
Swiss Albums (Schweizer Hitparade)	27
UK Albums (OCC)	13

== Certifications ==
Region	Certification	Certified units/sales
France (SNEP)	Gold	100,000^{*}
United Kingdom (BPI)	Silver	60,000^{^}
^{*} Sales figures based on certification alone.^{^} Shipments figures based on certification alone.
