= Pathway to the Moon =

Single by MN8

from the album To the Next Level
- B-side: "Someone to Love"
- Released: February 12, 1996
- Genre: R&B, new jack swing
- Length: 3:44
- Label: Columbia
- Songwriters: M Puryear; M Hummon
- Producers: Dennis Charles; Ronnie Wilson

MN8 singles chronology
"Baby It's You" (1995)	"Pathway to the Moon" (1996)	"Tuff Act to Follow" (1996)

Music video
- "Pathway to the Moon" on YouTube

"Pathway to the Moon" is a song by British R&B group MN8. It was released in February 1996 as the fifth single from their debut album, To the Next Level. It peaked at number 25 on the UK Singles Chart. The single also includes the tracks Someone To Love and 4 Ya Flava.

== Track listings ==
- 12"
1. "Pathway to the Moon"
2. "Baby It's You" (OJI West Coast Mix)
3. "Happy" (Jodeci Mix)
4. "Someone to Love" — 3:52
- CD single
1. "Pathway to the Moon" — 3:44
2. "Someone to Love" — 3:52
3. "Baby It's You" (OJI West Coast Mix) — 4:15
4. '4 Ya Flava' — 4:44
- Cassette single
1. "Pathway to the Moon" — 3:44
2. "Someone to Love" — 3:52

== Charts ==
Chart (1996)	Peak position
Scotland (OCC)	50
UK Singles (OCC)	25
UK Airplay (Music Week)	42
UK Hip Hop/R&B (OCC)	5
