= Jekyll and Hyde (TV series) =

British fantasy drama television series

- Genre: Fantasy; Action; Drama; Thriller; Horror
- Created by: Charlie Higson
- Based on: Strange Case of Dr. Jekyll and Mr. Hyde by Robert Louis Stevenson
- Directed by: Stewart Svaasand; Colin Teague
- Starring: Tom Bateman; Richard E. Grant; Tom Rhys Harries; Enzo Cilenti; Michael Karim; Natalie Gumede; Stephanie Hyam; Christian McKay; Donald Sumpter
- Composers: David Arnold; Michael Price
- Country of origin: United Kingdom
- Original language: English
- No. of series: 1
- No. of episodes: 10

Production
- Executive producers: Charlie Higson; Francis Hopkinson
- Producer: Foz Allan
- Cinematography: Simon Dennis; Suzie Lavelle
- Running time: 45–46 minutes
- Production company: ITV Studios

Original release
- Network: ITV
- Release: 25 October – 27 December 2015

Jekyll and Hyde is a British television fantasy drama based loosely on Robert Louis Stevenson's 1886 novella Strange Case of Dr Jekyll and Mr Hyde. Set in 1930s London and Ceylon, it follows the character of Dr. Robert Jekyll, a grandson of the Victorian Dr. Henry Jekyll, who has inherited his grandfather's split personality and violent alter-ego.

The series aired on ITV in the United Kingdom from 25 October to 27 December 2015 and it consisted of ten episodes. On 5 January 2016, creator Charlie Higson announced on Twitter that ITV had decided to pass on a second series.

== Plot ==
Dr. Robert Jekyll has just finished his studies and is happy to be working as a doctor in the medical practice of his adoptive father Dr. Najaran in Sri Lanka. One day he unexpectedly receives a letter from England from the lawyer Maxwell Utterson about an inheritance case. While Robert is on his way to England, a gang of thugs from the Tenebrae organization led by the shady Captain Dance visits the Najaran family and kills everyone except their teenage son Ravi, who manages to escape.

Unsuspecting, Robert visits Utterson in London, who explains to him that his grandfather left behind some property, including a house. Since Henry Jekyll was his father Gabriel Utterson's friend, Max feels obliged to settle the inheritance matter in Robert's favor.

Robert learns for the first time the name of his father Louis, who went missing when Robert was still small. Now he hopes to be able to find out more about his family. He sets out to search with Max and his assistant Hils and soon comes across a hidden laboratory and people who know about the strange case of his grandfather and his "friend" Edward Hyde. He also meets two women, Lily Clark and Isabella Charming, who fascinate him in very different ways.

Danger threatens from the Tenebrae organization, which will use any means necessary to get its hands on Robert and the Jekylls' secret knowledge. The secret service MI0, on the other hand, fights against monsters and supernatural phenomena of all kinds.

== Cast ==
- Tom Bateman – Dr. Robert Jekyll/Hyde, the grandson of the Victorian Dr. Henry Jekyll/Mr. Edward Hyde, the son of Louis, twin brother of Olalla.
- Richard E. Grant – Sir Roger Bulstrode, a British Intelligence officer studying supernatural phenomena.
- Tom Rhys Harries – Mr Sackler, a sniper working for Sir Roger Bulstrode.
- Enzo Cilenti – Captain Dance, senior officer for monster organisation, the Tenebrae.
- Michael Karim – Ravi Najaran, Vishal and Gurinder's son and Robert's foster-brother.
- Ace Bhatti – Dr. Vishal Najaran, Gurinder's husband, Ravi's father and Robert Jekyll's foster-father in Ceylon.
- Lolita Chakrabarti – Gurinder Najaran, Vishal's wife, Ravi's mother and Robert Jekyll's foster-mother in Ceylon.
- Natalie Gumede – Isabella "Bella" Charming, the owner of an East End nightclub the Empire, and love interest of Robert's Hyde persona.
- Stephanie Hyam – Lily Clarke Carew, a former biochemistry student of Cambridge, also, Lily Carew, granddaughter of the murdered Sir Danvers Carew.
- Christian McKay – Maxwell Utterson, Robert's estate lawyer whose father, Gabriel Utterson, worked for Dr. Henry Jekyll.
- Ruby Bentall – Hilary "Hils" Barnstaple, Maxwell's assistant.
- Donald Sumpter – Garson, once Henry Jekyll's assistant/footman, now the bartender of the Empire nightclub.
- Sinéad Cusack – Maggie Kendall/Hope. Lover of Victorian Dr. Henry Jekyll/Mr. Edward Hyde, mother of Louis and grandmother of Robert and Olalla.
- Wallis Day – Olalla Jekyll/Hyde, granddaughter of the Victorian Dr. Henry Jekyll/Mr. Edward Hyde, daughter of Louis and twin sister of Robert.
- Amelia Bullmore – Renata Jezequiel, a distant relative of the Jekyll family.
- Natasha O'Keeffe – Fedora, member of Tenebrae and love interest of Dance.
- Tony Way – Cyclops Silas Parnell, member of Tenebrae, minion of Dance and leader of a gang of one-eyed thugs.
- Dee Tails – The Harbinger, a creature.
- Phil McKee – Mr Hannigan, an MIO agent working for Sir Roger Bulstrode.
- Mark Bonnar – Lord Protheroe, head of Daily Truth, harbourer of Fedora and the "killed" Dance.
- David Bark-Jones and Thomas Coombes – Dr. Henry Jekyll/Mr. Edward Hyde, Robert and Olalla's paternal grandfather and the father of Louis.

== Production ==
The series was based at 3 Mills Studios and also filmed in Kent – Rochester High Street doubles as the exterior of the Empire Music Hall and The Guildhall Museum features as the hotel where Dr. Jekyll (Tom Bateman) first lodges when arriving in England. The Historic Dockyard Chatham was used as location for the scenes used for Gravesend Docks, Tenebrae offices and factory and various areas of the site feature as London Streets and markets. Elmley Nature Reserve features in episode three as the setting for Maggie's (Niamh Walsh) country house and the Fort Amherst tunnels are used in episodes 9 and 10 where Jekyll finds out about the powers of The Incubus.

== Episodes ==
No.	Title	Directed by	Written by	Original release date	Prod. code
1	"The Harbinger"	Colin Teague	Charlie Higson	25 October 2015	2-2650-0001
After his name appears in a local paper, Robert Jekyll is contacted by his biological grandfather's lawyer in London about the family estate.
2	"Mr. Hyde"	Colin Teague	Charlie Higson	1 November 2015	2-2650-0002
Confused at events since arriving in London, Robert attempts to carry out further research in his grandfather's laboratory.
3	"The Cutter"	Colin Teague	Charlie Higson	8 November 2015	2-2650-0003
The arrival of the mysterious Captain Dance in London incites further activity from MIO's captives, while Robert attempts to control his transformation using his grandfather's serum.
4	"The Calyx"	Joss Agnew	Charlie Higson	22 November 2015	2-2650-0004
While trying to harness his abilities as Hyde to save his long-lost grandmother, Robert finds himself caught between Tenebrae and MIO as he is tempted to open an ancient container.
5	"Black Dog"	Robert Quinn	Guy Burt	29 November 2015	2-2650-0005
When Robert and Utterson investigate another branch of the Jekyll family tree, they find themselves facing an unexpected new threat.
6	"Spring-Heeled Jack"	Steward Svaasand	Jason Sutton	6 December 2015	2-2650-0006
The return of an old serial killer prompts MIO to 'ask' Robert for help.
7	"The Reaper"	Steward Svaasand	Simon J. Ashford	13 December 2015	2-2650-0007
When his brother is taken as the new 'host' for the Reaper, Robert must resort to unconventional methods to save his life.
8	"Moroii"	Robert Quinn	Sophie Petzal	23 December 2015	2-2650-0008
When he is asked to investigate an apparent vampire attack, Robert is shocked to learn that the true culprit is his previously-unknown sister.
9	"The Incubus"	Joss Agnew	Gareth Roberts	27 December 2015	2-2650-0009
Hiding out in the country, Robert and his family face an unanticipated new threat in the form of an incubus.
10	"The Heart of Lord Trash"	Steward Svaasand	Charlie Higson	27 December 2015	2-2650-0010
Various secrets come to light, culminating in a final confrontation between Robert and Dance over the Calyx.

== Broadcast ==
Network(s)/Station(s)	Series premiere	Airing dates	Title
Canada	CBC TV	11 January 2016 on CBC.	Jekyll and Hyde ( ; lit: )
Thailand	Channel 3 Family (13)	4 June 2018 – 8 July 2018 (Monday - Thursday 22:30)	หมอวิปริตจิตหลุดโลก (Jekyll and Hyde; lit: )
Thailand	5HD1	23 November 2019 – 22 December 2019 (Every Saturday and Sunday from 20.20 - 21.20)	หมอวิปริตจิตหลุดโลก (Jekyll and Hyde; lit: )

== Controversies ==
The opening episode attracted 459 complaints to the UK broadcasting regulator Ofcom in regard to the level of violence contained within a programme shown at 6.30pm. Ofcom subsequently announced that it had launched an investigation, which ultimately ruled that the show had breached the Ofcom Broadcasting Code, as children were not "protected from unsuitable material by appropriate scheduling."

After the November 2015 Paris attacks, episode 4 was delayed for a week as it was felt that the subject matter would be upsetting with the fresh memories of the experience.

== Cancellation ==
On 5 January 2016, ITV confirmed that it would not be renewing Jekyll and Hyde for a second series. Reasons included poor and decreasing viewing figures, unfavourable comparisons to Doctor Who and public backlash following "hundreds of complaints" regarding the appropriateness of the content for a teatime family show.

=== Unmade second series ===
On 8 July 2016, Higson explained in a tweets thread what would have happened in series 2: "We had lots of great stories already written for series 2 of Jekyll & Hyde. Robert was going to find out a lot more about his mother and find his father. He was going to reluctantly work for MIO. Robert & Ravi were going to return to Sri Lanka & uncover some buried secrets. Bella's family history was going to come into play. There were going to be some shocking deaths and reversals. And we were going to find out a lot more about Lord Trash... Instead, since ITV didn't want to make any more, they’re all dead!"

== See also ==
- Jekyll - 2007 BBC TV series, written by Steven Moffatt.
