= Dreaming (MN8 song) =

Single by MN8

from the album Freaky
- B-side: "[Dreaming] 'Bout U"
- Released: October 14, 1996
- Genre: R&B, new jack swing
- Length: 3:35
- Label: Columbia
- Songwriters: Britten; Reeves; Lyle
- Producers: Dennis Charles; Ronnie Wilson

MN8 singles chronology
"'Tuff Act to Follow'" (1996)	"Dreaming" (1996)

Music video
- "Dreaming" on YouTube

"Dreaming" is a song by British R&B group MN8. It was released in October 1996 from their second album, Freaky. It peaked at number 21 on the UK Singles Chart.

== Critical reception ==
British magazine Music Week rated "Dreaming" three out of five. The reviewer added, "MN8 go all soppy for this soulful ballad from the forthcoming album, their seventh single and slowest to date."

== Track listings ==
CD 1

1. "Dreaming" (Radio Version) — 3:35
2. "Dreaming" (Album Version) — 5:09
3. "Dreaming" (Acappella Version) — 4:42
4. "[Dreaming] 'Bout U" — 4:03

CD 2

1. "Dreaming" (Radio Version) — 3:35
2. "Dreaming" (C-Swing Soul Mix) — 5:36
3. "The Player" — 4:29
4. "Tuff Act To Follow" (Torins Act Up Mix) — 8:54

Cassette single

1. "Dreaming" (Radio Version) — 3:35
2. "[Dreaming] 'Bout U" — 4:03

== Charts ==
Chart (1996)	Peak position
UK Singles (OCC)	21
UK Airplay (Music Week)	41
UK Hip Hop/R&B (OCC)	7
