= MN8 =

English R&B pop group

- Also known as: Da Jeuce
- Origin: Surrey, England
- Genres: R&B, pop, new jack swing, black pop
- Years active: 1992–1999
- Labels: Sony/Columbia Records UK; Sony/Work Group US; First Avenue
- Past members: KG; G-Man; Kule T Dee Tails

MN8 are an English R&B-pop group. They consisted of KG (lead vocalist), Kule T (lead vocalist, songwriter), G-Man (lead vocalist), and Dee Tails (rapper, stylist and choreographer).

== Career ==
MN8's 1995 debut hit single, "I've Got a Little Something for You", credited as written by Oliver Smallman and Mark Taylor aka. Vintage Future American record producer and composer, produced by Dennis Charles & Ronnie Wilson became a success throughout Europe, Asia Pacific and the US. Notably, the song was one of P. Diddy's earliest Bad Boy Records remixes. It was featured in the film, Bad Boys. The song was also Columbia UK's first homegrown Top 10 record in over a decade, held off the number 1 spot in the UK Singles Chart by Celine Dion's "Think Twice" which topped the UK chart for seven weeks. Nonetheless, MN8 finished the year ahead of Seal's "Kiss from a Rose" as one of the biggest selling UK singles for the year. MN8 followed up with 6 more UK Top 30 hits including "If You Only Let Me In", "Baby It's You", "Tuff Act to Follow", "Dreaming", "Pathway to the Moon" and a cover of the Surface hit "Happy".

Their debut album, To The Next Level reached number 13 in the UK Albums Chart. To The Next Level (produced by Dennis Charles & Ronnie Wilson) included a contribution from Pamela Sheyne, who wrote the song "Baby It's You". Besides P. Diddy and Sheyne, MN8 collaborated with the late Oji Pearce (Montell Jordan's "This Is How We Do It"), Simon Climie, Arthur Baker, Steve Silk Hurley, Conner Reeves, Blacksmith and Dalvin DeGrate (Jodeci).

MN8 have toured alongside Janet Jackson, Diana King, Brownstone, Spice Girls, Madonna, Celine Dion, Robbie Williams, Boyzone, East 17, Vanilla (group), Backstreet Boys and Ricky Martin. They also appeared at the Smash Hits Poll Winners Party, Midem, Notting Hill Carnival, Sweden's Water Festival and other European music festivals.

In 1997, MN8 parted ways with Sony/Columbia & 1st Avenue. When the deal had expired, MN8 partnered with the French concert promoter Gerard Drouot to tour France in 1997 and 1998. After their last show at the end of 1998, MN8 decided to take a break indefinitely to pursue other opportunities.

In an interview with Digital Spy on 13 April 2009, lead singer KG said of the split and any prospects of a reunion: "Around 1998 and 1999 we did our last European shows. We were at the end of our deal with Sony and weren't really sure what we wanted to do. We decided to take a break and think things through. Quite a lot's happened in the past few months actually. We're in tentative talks about maybe putting MN8 back together and doing a tour. The thing about MN8 is that we never did the sort of music we should have done. We had the right aesthetic but the potential to do so much more. If you look at the commercial side of R&B these days, we would have fitted in better. We were kind of ahead of our time in some ways."

In 2013 co-lead singer G-man was interviewed by Twin B on BBC 1xtra where he announced that MN8 are still together and that a new MN8 album 'Reloaded' is the works and asserted MN8's pop music legacy and importance "How are you going to write a story about the best acts of the past 15 years, and not mention us". (Incidentally, it had been 16 years since MN8's last release.) G-man also revealed friendly rivalry with East 17, spending time with Robbie Williams, auditioning the Spice Girls for Sony before they were signed to Virgin and MN8's influence on some of pop music's most popular US and UK acts. As of 2018, no new material has been released.

== In media ==
- MN8 appeared on the Childliners record "The Gift of Christmas" alongside the Backstreet Boys, Boyzone, East 17, Peter Andre and Dannii Minogue.
- MN8 hosted Top of the Pops on 14 March 1996.

== Discography ==
=== Studio albums ===
Title	Album details	Peak chart positions										Certifications
Title	Album details	UK	UK R&B	AUS	BEL	FRA	GER	NED	NZ	SCO	SWI	Certifications
To the Next Level	Released: May 15, 1995; Label: Columbia; Formats: CS, CD	13	4	25	43	26	61	50	46	49	27	UK: Silver; FRA: Gold
Freaky	Released: November 4, 1996; Label: Columbia; Formats: CS, CD	114	—	—	—	—	—	—	—	—	—	
"—" denotes items that did not chart or were not released in that territory.

=== Singles ===
==== As lead artist ====
Year	Title	Peak chart positions										Certifications	Album
Year	Title	UK	UK R&B	AUS	BEL	FRA	GER	IRE	NED	NZ	SCO	Certifications	Album
1995	"I've Got a Little Something for You"	2	1	7	11	3	30	2	13	3	9	UK: Silver; AUS: Gold; FRA: Silver; NZ: Gold	To the Next Level
1995	"If You Only Let Me In"	6	1	30	47	23	64	7	18	3	13		To the Next Level
1995	"Happy"	8	2	—	—	—	—	23	—	11	18		To the Next Level
1995	"Baby It's You"	22	6	—	—	—	—	—	—	34	52		To the Next Level
1996	"Pathway to the Moon"	25	5	—	—	—	—	—	—	—	50		To the Next Level
1996	"Tuff Act to Follow"	15	3	—	—	43	—	—	—	—	27		Freaky
1996	"Dreaming"	21	7	—	—	—	—	—	—	—	35		Freaky
"—" denotes items that did not chart or were not released in that territory.

==== As featured artist ====
Year	Title	Peak chart positions			Album
Year	Title	UK	IRE	SCO	Album
1995	"The Gift of Christmas" (As part of Childliners)	9	10	7	Non-album single
