= List of UK R&B Albums Chart number ones of 1995 =

The logo of the Official Charts Company, responsible for compiling all of the official music charts in the United Kingdom, including the R&B albums chart.

The UK R&B Chart is a weekly chart, first introduced in October 1994, that ranks the 40 biggest-selling singles and albums that are classified in the R&B genre in the United Kingdom. The chart is compiled by the Official Charts Company, and is based on sales of CDs, downloads, vinyl and other formats over the previous seven days.

The following are the number-one albums of 1995.

== Number-one albums ==
Issue date	Album	Artist(s)	Record label	Ref.
1 January	Always & Forever	Eternal	EMI	
8 January	Dummy	Portishead	Go! Beat	
15 January	Dummy	Portishead	Go! Beat	
22 January	Always & Forever	Eternal	EMI	
29 January	Always & Forever	Eternal	EMI	
5 February	12 Play	R. Kelly	Jive	
12 February	12 Play	R. Kelly	Jive	
19 February	Always & Forever	Eternal	EMI	
26 February	Protection / No Protection	Massive Attack	Circa/Virgin	
5 March	Pure Swing	Various Artists	Dino	
12 March	Pure Swing	Various Artists	Dino	
19 March	Pure Swing	Various Artists	Dino	
26 March	Pure Swing	Various Artists	Dino	
2 April	Exodus	The New Power Generation	NPG	
9 April	Drive Thru Booty	Freak Power	Island	
16 April	100% Acid Jazz	Various Artists	Telstar	
23 April	100% Acid Jazz	Various Artists	Telstar	
30 April	Street Soul	Various Artists	Virgin	
7 May	Street Soul	Various Artists	Virgin	
14 May	Street Soul	Various Artists	Virgin	
21 May	Street Soul	Various Artists	Virgin	
28 May	Street Soul	Various Artists	Virgin	
4 June	Pure Swing II	Various Artists	Dino	
11 June	Pure Swing II	Various Artists	Dino	
18 June	HIStory: Past, Present and Future, Book I	Michael Jackson	Epic/MJJ Productions	
25 June	HIStory: Past, Present and Future, Book I	Michael Jackson	Epic/MJJ Productions	
2 July	HIStory: Past, Present and Future, Book I	Michael Jackson	Epic/MJJ Productions	
9 July	HIStory: Past, Present and Future, Book I	Michael Jackson	Epic/MJJ Productions	
16 July	HIStory: Past, Present and Future, Book I	Michael Jackson	Epic/MJJ Productions	
23 July	The Show, the After Party, the Hotel	Jodeci	Uptown/MCA	
30 July	HIStory: Past, Present and Future, Book I	Michael Jackson	Epic/MJJ Productions	
6 August	Volume V Believe	Soul II Soul	Virgin/EMI	
13 August	Timeless	Goldie	FFRR Records	
20 August	CrazySexyCool	TLC	LaFace/Arista	
27 August	Pure Swing III	Various Artists	Dino	
3 September	Pure Swing III	Various Artists	Dino	
10 September	Pure Swing III	Various Artists	Dino	
17 September	CrazySexyCool	TLC	LaFace/Arista	
24 September	CrazySexyCool	TLC	LaFace/Arista	
1 October	Daydream	Mariah Carey	Columbia	
8 October	Design of a Decade: 1986–1996	Janet Jackson	A&M	
15 October	Design of a Decade: 1986–1996	Janet Jackson	A&M	
22 October	Design of a Decade: 1986–1996	Janet Jackson	A&M	
29 October	Design of a Decade: 1986–1996	Janet Jackson	A&M	
5 November	Power of a Woman	Eternal	EMI	
12 November	Pure Swing IV	Various Artists	Dino	
19 November	Pure Swing IV	Various Artists	Dino	
26 November	Pure Swing IV	Various Artists	Dino	
3 December	Pure Swing IV	Various Artists	Dino	
10 December	HIStory: Past, Present and Future, Book I	Michael Jackson	Epic/MJJ Productions	
17 December	HIStory: Past, Present and Future, Book I	Michael Jackson	Epic/MJJ Productions	
24 December	HIStory: Past, Present and Future, Book I	Michael Jackson	Epic/MJJ Productions	
31 December	HIStory: Past, Present and Future, Book I	Michael Jackson	Epic/MJJ Productions	

== See also ==
- List of UK Albums Chart number ones of 1995
