= If You Only Let Me In =

1995 single by MN8

Single by MN8

from the album To the Next Level
- B-side: "I'll Be Gone"
- Released: 17 April 1995
- Genre: Pop
- Length: 4:03
- Label: Columbia; 1st Avenue
- Songwriters: Arthur Baker; Axel Kroell; Conner Reeves
- Producers: Dennis Charles; Ronnie Wilson

MN8 singles chronology
"I've Got a Little Something for You" (1995)	"If You Only Let Me In" (1995)	"Happy" (1995)

Music video
- "If You Only Let Me In" on YouTube

"If You Only Let Me In" is a song by British R&B group MN8, released in April 1995, by Columbia Records, as the second single from their debut album, To the Next Level (1995). It was written by Arthur Baker, Axel Kroell and Conner Reeves, and produced by Dennis Charles and Ronnie Wilson. The song was the follow-up to their hugely successful "I've Got a Little Something for You", and peaked at number six on the UK Singles Chart and number three in New Zealand.

== Critical reception ==
In his weekly UK chart commentary, James Masterton wrote, "Their second hit single is if anything even better than the first, more of a proper pop song and an instant radio smash. It crashes in one place higher than its predecessor and certainly deserves to at least match its peak." Music & Media commented, "If you witnessed them on Janet Jackson's tour, you must have heard their Staxmoulded second single with a sample or copy of Steve Cropper's guitar out of 'In the Midnight Hour'."

Gill Whyte from Smash Hits gave it a top score of five out of five and named it Best New Single. She added, "On first hearing this you think, well, this isn't as menacingly naughty as 'I've Got a Little Something for You', but then hold on, vicar! What's this about letting me in and giving everything? They ARE being naughty! I tell you, these boys must bathe daily in a vat of testosterone 'cos they just ooze sexiness, and as for those armadillos stuffed down their low-slung trousers... oops, sorry, got carried away there! What I meant to say was this is another classic soulful, pop number from the fruity fellas, and catchier than the number 12 bus. Grrr8. (Grrroan.)"

== Track listings ==
- 7-inch and cassette single
1. "If You Only Let Me In" (radio mix) – 4:03
2. "I'll Be Gone" – 4:30
- 12-inch single
1. "If You Only Let Me In" (12-inch mix)
2. "If You Only Let Me In" (album mix)
3. "If You Only Let Me In" (drum dub)
- CD single
1. "If You Only Let Me In" (radio mix) – 3:43
2. "If You Only Let Me In" (Absolute 12-inch mix) – 5:07
3. "If You Only Let Me In" (club mix) – 7:49
4. "I'll Be Gone" – 4:30

== Charts ==
=== Weekly charts ===
Chart (1995)	Peak position
Australia (ARIA)	30
Belgium (Ultratop 50 Flanders)	47
Belgium (Ultratop 50 Wallonia)	33
Europe (Eurochart Hot 100)	13
Europe (European AC Radio)	22
Europe (European Dance Radio)	7
Europe (European Hit Radio)	27
France (SNEP)	23
France Airplay (SNEP)	12
Germany (GfK)	64
Holland Airplay (Music & Media)	11
Iceland (Íslenski Listinn Topp 40)	16
Ireland (IRMA)	7
Israel (Israeli Singles Chart)	27
Netherlands (Dutch Top 40)	18
Netherlands (Single Top 100)	18
New Zealand (Recorded Music NZ)	3
Scottish Singles Sales (Official Charts)	13
Spain Airplay (Top 40 Radio)	40
UK Singles (Official Charts)	6
UK Airplay (Music Week)	3
UK Hip Hop/R&B (Official Charts)	1
UK Club Chart (Music Week)	58
UK Pop Tip Club Chart (Music Week)	16

=== Year-end charts ===
Chart (1995)	Position
France (SNEP)	80
New Zealand (RIANZ)	30

== Release history ==
Region	Date	Format(s)	Label(s)	Ref.
United Kingdom	17 April 1995	7-inch vinyl; CD; cassette	Columbia; 1st Avenue	
Australia	19 June 1995	CD; cassette	Columbia; 1st Avenue	
