= Patrick Tubach =

- Born: Simsbury, Connecticut
- Occupation: visual effects supervisor
- Years active: 1996—present

Patrick "Pat" Tubach (born 1974/1975) is a visual effects supervisor. Tubach and his fellow visual effects artists were nominated for an Academy Award for Best Visual Effects for the 2013 film Star Trek Into Darkness and the 2015 film Star Wars: The Force Awakens. His only acting credit to date is as an uncredited theater patron in Star Wars: Episode III – Revenge of the Sith, in which he also worked as a digital composing supervisor.

== Early life ==
Tubach was born and raised in Simsbury, Connecticut to Paul and Marian Tubach. His father worked for an insurance company for more than thirty years. Tubach's earliest works related to film came in high school, when he "did short films and wrote and directed them, and my friends would star in them". Tubach attended Baker University, which is where his father also attended, and graduated in 1996.

== Works ==
=== Early career ===
At the suggestion of his older brother Doug, Tubach and a friend of his moved to Los Angeles, where Doug, who was a digital effects supervisor for Cinesite, got them jobs working on Space Jam, where they had to remove tracking marks on Green screens. He was eventually hired by Cinesite, who he would work for for another three years before moving to Seattle, Washington.

=== Films ===
Tubach has worked on films such as Space Jam (1996), Air Force One (1997), RocketMan (1997), The Mummy (1999), Jurassic Park III (2001), Star Wars: Episode II – Attack of the Clones (2002), Pirates of the Caribbean: The Curse of the Black Pearl (2003), Peter Pan (2003), Star Wars: Episode III – Revenge of the Sith (2005), Chicken Little (2005), Harry Potter and the Goblet of Fire (2005), Mission: Impossible III (2006), Pirates of the Caribbean: Dead Man's Chest (2006), Pirates of the Caribbean: At World's End (2007), Transformers (2007), Iron Man (2008), WALL-E (2008), Transformers: Revenge of the Fallen (2009), Harry Potter and the Half-Blood Prince (2009), The Last Airbender (2010), Super 8 (2011), Battleship (2012), The Avengers (2012), Star Trek Into Darkness (2013), Captain America: The Winter Soldier (2014), Transformers: Age of Extinction (2014), Star Wars: The Force Awakens (2015), Solo: A Star Wars Story (2018), Star Wars: The Rise of Skywalker (2019), and The Kissing Booth 2 (2020).

=== Directors ===
Tubach has worked with the following directors: Joe Pytka, Wolfgang Petersen, Stephen Sommers, Joe Johnston, George Lucas, Gore Verbinski, Mike Newell, J. J. Abrams, Jon Favreau, Andrew Stanton, Michael Bay, David Yates, M. Night Shyamalan, Peter Berg, Joss Whedon, Anthony and Joe Russo, Ron Howard.

== Personal life ==
He lives in San Francisco, California with his wife and children.

== Nominations ==
Year	Film	Award	Ceremony	Result
2013	Star Trek Into Darkness	Academy Award for Best Visual Effects	86th Academy Awards	Nominated
2015	Star Wars: The Force Awakens	Academy Award for Best Visual Effects	88th Academy Awards	Nominated
2018	Solo: A Star Wars Story	Academy Award for Best Visual Effects	91st Academy Awards	Nominated
2019	Star Wars: The Rise of Skywalker	Academy Award for Best Visual Effects	92nd Academy Awards	Nominated
