= I've Got a Little Something for You =

1995 single by MN8

Single by MN8

from the album To the Next Level
- Released: 23 January 1995
- Genre: Swingbeat
- Length: 3:43
- Label: Columbia; 1st Avenue
- Songwriter: Mark Taylor
- Producers: Dennis Charles; Ronnie Wilson

MN8 singles chronology
"I've Got a Little Something for You" (1995)	"If You Only Let Me In" (1995)

Music video
- "I've Got a Little Something for You" on YouTube

"I've Got a Little Something for You" is a song by English R&B group MN8. It was released on 23 January 1995 by Columbia and First Avenue Records as the lead single from their debut album, To the Next Level (1995). The song was written by Mark Taylor and was produced by Dennis Charles and Ronnie Wilson. It peaked at number two on the UK Singles Chart, reached number three in France and New Zealand, and charted within the top 10 in eight other territories, including Australia, Ireland, Norway, and the Wallonia region of Belgium.

== Critical reception ==
Gil Robertson IV from Cash Box wrote, "This sexy and hard-groove track from MN8's upcoming debut has all the right grooves to make this group a favorite of the urban set. Radio will find this track immediately accessible. The vocals are clean and the music is some of the best that I've heard in a long time." In his weekly UK chart commentary, James Masterton said, "The biggest new hit of the week comes seemingly from nowhere. A clever programme of promotional appearances from the latest batch of young swingbeaters gives MN8 the momentum they need to crash straight into the Top 10 with their first ever hit." He also complimented the "radio-friendly nature" of the track.

Everett True from Melody Maker commented, "You must have heard it by now. [...] Sex, swingbeat, style. More hooks than Pop Will Eat Itself have managed in their entire career. More pelvic thrusts in under four minutes than in a complete La Toya Jackson work-out video. More sexual innuendo than an Italian Benny Hill. MN8's debut single is best described as a "Cross between R Kelly and Eternal" (Smash Hits). It starts off sinister, turns into samba and ends up plain smutty. Every girl on my street has lusted after them for months." Mark Sutherland for NME wrote, "That all-conquering debut smash may have only offered a "little something for you" but, hey, at least it was SOMETHING. Gr8." He also praised it as "pure sexed-up swingbeat mastery". In his review in Smash Hits, Sutherland gave it three out of five, adding, "Dodgy name, dodgy trousers, good single."

== Track listings ==
- 7-inch and CD single
1. "I've Got a Little Something for You" (radio version) – 3:43
2. "I've Got a Little Something for You" (Bad Boy Stripped Down mix) – 4:18
- Maxi-CD and 12-inch maxi
1. "I've Got a Little Something for You" (radio version) – 3:43
2. "I've Got a Little Something for You" (Bad Boy Stripped Down vocal mix) – 4:18
3. "I've Got a Little Something for You" (West End mix) – 5:21
4. "I've Got a Little Something for You" (West End dub) – 5:19
- 12-inch maxi – Remixes
1. "I've Got a Little Something for You" (Tee's original club mix) – 5:41
2. "I've Got a Little Something for You" (Club Float Mix edit) – 5:45
3. "I've Got a Little Something for You" (Player's Club Mix edit) – 6:02
4. "I've Got a Little Something for You" (Tee's original instrumental) – 5:18
5. "I've Got a Little Something for You" (Float instrumental) – 5:49
6. "I've Got a Little Something for You" (Player's instrumental) – 5:49

== Charts ==
=== Weekly charts ===
Chart (1995)	Peak position
Australia (ARIA)	7
Belgium (Ultratop 50 Flanders)	11
Belgium (Ultratop 50 Wallonia)	4
Canada Dance/Urban (RPM)	20
Denmark (IFPI)	6
Europe (Eurochart Hot 100)	10
Europe (European Dance Radio)	7
Europe (European Hit Radio)	20
Finland (Suomen virallinen lista)	12
France (SNEP)	3
France Airplay (SNEP)	4
Germany (GfK)	30
Ireland (IRMA)	2
Israel (Israeli Singles Chart)	16
Netherlands (Dutch Top 40)	17
Netherlands (Single Top 100)	13
New Zealand (Recorded Music NZ)	3
Norway (VG-lista)	6
Scottish Singles Sales (Official Charts)	9
Spain (AFYVE)	7
Spain Airplay (Top 40 Radio)	26
Sweden (Sverigetopplistan)	9
Switzerland (Schweizer Hitparade)	10
UK Singles (Official Charts)	2
UK Airplay (Music Week)	13
UK Dance (Official Charts)	6
UK Hip Hop/R&B (Official Charts)	1
UK Club Chart (Music Week)	35
UK Pop Tip Club Chart (Music Week)	13

=== Year-end charts ===
Chart (1995)	Position
Australia (ARIA)	50
Belgium (Ultratop 50 Flanders)	91
Belgium (Ultratop 50 Wallonia)	19
Europe (Eurochart Hot 100)	42
France (SNEP)	20
France Airplay (SNEP)	47
Netherlands (Dutch Top 40)	136
New Zealand (RIANZ)	7
Norway Vinter Period (VG-lista)	16
Sweden (Topplistan)	75
UK Singles (OCC)	38

== Certifications ==
Region	Certification	Certified units/sales
Australia (ARIA)	Gold	35,000^{^}
France (SNEP)	Gold	250,000^{*}
New Zealand (RMNZ)	Gold	5,000^{*}
United Kingdom (BPI)	Silver	200,000^{^}
^{*} Sales figures based on certification alone.^{^} Shipments figures based on certification alone.

== Release history ==
Region	Date	Format(s)	Label(s)	Ref.
United Kingdom	23 January 1995	7-inch vinyl; 12-inch vinyl; CD; cassette	Columbia; 1st Avenue	
Australia	20 March 1995	CD; cassette	Columbia	
Japan	21 June 1995	CD	Epic/Sony	
United States	3 July 1995	Rhythmic contemporary; contemporary hit radio	Work; 1st Avenue	
