= Thank You & Goodnight Tour =

2018–19 concert tour by Boyzone

Thank You & Goodnight: The Farewell Tour
- Tour by Boyzone
- Associated album: Thank You & Goodnight
- Start date: 16 August 2018
- End date: 6 June 2026
- Legs: 6
- No. of shows: 21 in Asia; 32 in Europe; 8 in Australasia; 61 total

Boyzone concert chronology
- BZ20 Tour (2013–15; 2017); Thank You & Goodnight: The Farewell Tour (2018–19, 2026)

The Thank You & Goodnight: The Farewell Tour (also known as the 25th Anniversary & Farewell Tour and Boyzone Live: In Celebration of their 25th Anniversary) is the eighth and final concert tour by Irish boy band, Boyzone. The tour supports the group's seventh studio album, Thank You & Goodnight (2018). The tour performed over 50 shows in Asia, Europe, and Australasia.

The tour continues in 2026 under the title 'Two for the Road'.

== Background ==
The tour was announced in June 2018, alongside their album. In the media, band members stated this would be their final tour and a farewell tour. Before the tour commenced, the band played several music festivals in the United Kingdom, including: "June Meeting", "Scotfest", "Kew the Music", the "York Races Music Showcase" and the "Ringsted Festival".

Speaking on the tour, the band stated: "Twenty-five years is a long time. […] We're also eager to invite you all to one final celebration of twenty-five years of Boyzone and our journey together. We would love for you to raise the roof one last time as we head out on our farewell UK and Ireland arena tour."

During the shows in southwest Asia, Keith Duffy was unable to perform several shows after falling ill in Hong Kong. Duffy returned to the stage for the show in Adelaide.

== Critical reception ==
The shows received mass praise throughout the run of the tour. For the Glasgow performance, Graeme Virtue from The Guardian gave the show three out of five stars. He says, "Despite the quartet being framed by a gigantic screen beaming lyric videos and vintage footage of the band as fresh-faced youngsters, this is a refreshingly gimmick-free gig. Except for two glam back-up singers, there is no band on stage and at no point does a 'Zoner strap on an acoustic or slide behind a piano to underline their musical authenticity."

Moving to Australasia, Jordan Brunnen of OutInPerth gave the show in Perth three and a half out of five stars. He said, "The concert demonstrated Boyzone's history and changes, having begun before the internet(!), yet they stay relevant with young energy on stage. Above all, the performance bought it all together for those who really love them most: those with fond memories of a youth with Boyzone playing on their mp3 players and radios."

In Wellington, Kate Robertson of Stuff wrote the band gave the crowd everything they wanted. She goes on to say, "Farewell tours are nearly always a guaranteed home run, because any group that cares about its fans will know they only want the hits. With that in mind, Boyzone made clear they cared. A lot The covers, the classics and the originals. There was no time to dwell on the sadness of it all, which instead made way for a set that was full of life, joy and gratitude. If this really is the end for the boisterous Irish boy band, they threw their fans on helluva leaving party."

== Opening acts ==
- Peet Montzingo (United Kingdom, October 2019)
- Asher Knight (United Kingdom & Ireland, Jan-Feb 2019)
- Miccoli (England, Ireland, Jan-Feb 2019) (select shows)
- Brian McFadden (Asia, Australasia)
- Luena (Glasgow, 26 January 2019)
- Isyana Sarasvati (Jakarta)

== Setlist ==
The following setlist was obtained from the concert held on 29 January 2019, at the Motorpoint Arena in Nottingham, England. It does not represent all concerts for the duration of the tour.

1. "Who We Are"
2. "Love Is a Hurricane"
3. "Isn't It a Wonder"
4. "Coming Home Now"
5. "Baby Can I Hold You"
6. "I Love the Way You Love Me"
7. "Because"
8. "Father and Son"
9. "Dream"
10. "Every Day I Love You"
11. "Key to My Life"
12. "Words"
13. "Talk About Love"
14. "Love You Anyway"
15. "When You Say Nothing at All"
16. "Love Me for a Reason"
17. "No Matter What"
18. "A Different Beat"
19. "When the Going Gets Tough"
20. "Life Is a Rollercoaster"
21. "Picture of You"

== Tour dates ==
Date	City	Country	Venue
Asia
16 August 2018	Colombo	Sri Lanka	CR & FC Grounds
18 August 2018	Bandung	Indonesia	Trans Luxury Hotel Convention Centre
19 August 2018^{[A]}	Yogyakarta	Indonesia	Prambanan Temple Compounds
21 August 2018	Singapore		Singapore Indoor Stadium
23 August 2018	Surabaya	Indonesia	Dyandra Grand Ballroom
24 August 2018	Kuala Lumpur	Malaysia	Axiata Arena
26 August 2018	Pasay	Philippines	Mall of Asia Arena
Europe
19 January 2019	Minehead	England	Skyline Pavilion
20 January 2019	Cardiff	Wales	Motorpoint Arena
21 January 2019	Hull	England	Bonus Arena
23 January 2019	Belfast	Northern Ireland	SSE Arena
24 January 2019	Dublin	Ireland	3Arena
26 January 2019	Glasgow	Scotland	SSE Hydro
27 January 2019	Liverpool	England	M&S Bank Arena
28 January 2019	Hull	England	Bonus Arena
29 January 2019	Nottingham	England	Motorpoint Arena
30 January 2019	Newcastle	England	Utilita Arena
1 February 2019	Leeds	England	First Direct Arena
2 February 2019	Manchester	England	Manchester Arena
4 February 2019	Cardiff	Wales	Motorpoint Arena
5 February 2019	Brighton	England	Brighton Centre
7 February 2019	London	England	The O_{2} Arena
8 February 2019	Birmingham	England	Arena Birmingham
9 February 2019	Bournemouth	England	Windsor Hall
10 February 2019	Bournemouth	England	Windsor Hall
12 February 2019	Glasgow	Scotland	SSE Hydro
13 February 2019	Newcastle	England	Utilita Arena
15 February 2019	Brighton	England	Brighton Centre
16 February 2019	London	England	SSE Arena
Asia
24 March 2019	Jakarta	Indonesia	Tennis Indoor Stadium GBK
26 March 2019	Kowloon Bay	Hong Kong	Star Hall
28 March 2019	Bangkok	Thailand	Thunder Dome
Australasia
30 March 2019	Perth	Australia	HBF Stadium
2 April 2019	Adelaide	Australia	AEC Theatre
3 April 2019	Melbourne	Australia	Margaret Court Arena
5 April 2019	Sydney	Australia	ICC Sydney Theatre
6 April 2019	Gold Coast	Australia	The Star Theatre
7 April 2019	Gold Coast	Australia	The Star Theatre
9 April 2019	Auckland	New Zealand	Spark Arena
10 April 2019	Wellington	New Zealand	TSB Bank Arena
Asia
12 April 2019	Dubai	United Arab Emirates	Dubai Duty Free Tennis Stadium
Europe
13 April 2019^{[B]}	Hasselt	Belgium	Ethias Arena
Asia
12 June 2019	Singapore		The Star Performing Arts Centre
14 June 2019	Shah Alam	Malaysia	Malawati Stadium
16 June 2019	Guangzhou	China	Guangzhou Gymnasium
18 June 2019	Shanghai	China	National Exhibition and Convention Center
20 June 2019	Beijing	China	Olympic Sports Center Gymnasium
22 June 2019	Taoyuan	Taiwan	Linkou Arena
23 June 2019	Pasay	Philippines	Mall of Asia Arena
25 June 2019	Nagoya	Japan	Forest Hall
26 June 2019	Tokyo	Japan	Toyosu PIT
27 June 2019	Osaka	Japan	Zepp Osaka Bayside
Europe
15 October 2019	Birmingham	England	Resorts World Arena
16 October 2019	Glasgow	Scotland	SSE Hydro
17 October 2019	Nottingham	England	Motorpoint Arena
19 October 2019	Manchester	England	Manchester Arena
21 October 2019	London	England	London Palladium
22 October 2019	London	England	London Palladium
23 October 2019	London	England	London Palladium
24 October 2019	London	England	London Palladium
25 October 2019	London	England	London Palladium
5 June 2026	London	England	Emirates Stadium
6 June 2026	London	England	Emirates Stadium

Festivals and other miscellaneous performances
^{A} This concert was a part of the "Prambanan Jazz Festival"
^{B} This concert was a part of the "I love the 90's - The party"

=== Box office score data ===
Venue	City	Tickets sold / available	Gross revenue
Motorpoint Arena	Cardiff	9,400 / 9,400 (100%)	$583,607
SSE Hydro	Glasgow	17,938 / 18,000 (99%)	$989,916
Utilita Arena	Newcastle	10,810 / 11,600 (93%)	$583,607
The O_{2} Arena	London	10,675 / 12,767 (84%)	$692,859
TOTAL (for the concerts listed)		48,823 / 51,767 (94%)	$2,849,989
