= The Tree of Seasons =

2010 book by Stephen Gately

- Front cover of The Tree of Seasons by Stephen Gately
- Author: Stephen Gately
- Illustrator: Keith Wilson
- Language: English
- Genre: Children's literature
- Publisher: Hodder & Stoughton
- Publication date: May 2010
- Publication place: Ireland
- Pages: 306

The Tree of Seasons is a children's book written by Stephen Gately and published posthumously by Hodder & Stoughton in 2010. It follows the adventures of three siblings - Josh, Michael and Beth Lotts - who are on their summer holidays, and is said to be similar in style to the works of Enid Blyton, C. S. Lewis and Walt Disney.

== Foreword ==
The foreword was written by Elton John and David Furnish.

== Introduction ==
The book's introduction was controversial. Written by Gately's partner Andrew Cowles, Gately's family were upset at references to Sheriff Street as one of "the poorest parts of Dublin City" and "a place of civil unrest and terrorist activity". The content of the introduction prompted the Gately family to release a statement to the Sunday Independent, published on 16 May 2010, saying they "wish to make it clear that these statements are not correct and do not reflect the views of the family" and that Gately completed his secondary education and even attended college. However, in several early interviews Stephen himself confessed to leaving education to join Boyzone, and never completing his finishing exams.

== Illustrations ==
Gately's friend, Keith Wilson, contributed black-and-white line drawings to the book.

== Completion ==
Following Gately's death in Spain in October 2009, the final drafts of The Tree of Seasons were completed in collaboration with June Considine and Jules Williams, with Andrew Cowles writing the acknowledgements.

== Promotion ==
Andrew Cowles embarked on an "extensive publicity campaign" following the book's publication. He appeared on The Late Late Show to discuss the book on 14 May 2010 and was nearly reduced to tears by the questions asked by presenter Ryan Tubridy. Tubridy responded to criticism by later remarking that Cowles had given "a very solid, brave interview and I know for a fact that he's happy with the way it went".

== Reception ==
Irish Independent reviewer Sarah Webb remarked: "For a young man with no previous writing experience, the Tree of Seasons is quite an achievement" and "would make, with the addition of some powerful songs, an excellent musical".

Sunday Tribune reviewer Pat Nugent compared it to Enid Blyton's The Faraway Tree series, remarked on "a host of kinks and clumsy moments that could have been fixed with relative ease", but said there was "a distinct possibility [Gately's] career as a children's author would have outpaced his status as a popstar".

At least 10,000 copies of The Tree of Seasons were pre-ordered in Ireland and at least 5,000 copies were pre-ordered in Britain.

At least 3,600 people called themselves fans on Facebook on the week of its release.

The book spent 3 weeks on the UK Best Sellers list.
