= Thank You & Goodnight =

Studio album by Boyzone
- Released: 16 November 2018
- Recorded: February – September 2018
- Genre: Pop
- Length: 40:21
- Label: Warner Music
- Producers: Cutfather; Daniel Davidsen; Goldfingers; Pete Kirtley; Chris Loco; Lee McCutcheon; Toby Scott; John Shanks; Steven Solomon; Peter Wallevik

Boyzone chronology
Dublin to Detroit (2014)	Thank You & Goodnight (2018)

Singles from Thank You & Goodnight
- 1. "Because" Released: 26 July 2018; 2. "Love" Released: 4 October 2018; 3. "Normal Boy" Released: 16 December 2018

Thank You & Goodnight is the seventh and final studio album by Irish boy band Boyzone, which was released on 16 November 2018. The album sold 100,000 copies in the UK.

== Background ==
Keith Duffy announced in March 2017 that Boyzone had a signed a contract with Warner Music for an album and an arena tour. In December 2017, it was announced that the album had been finalised and was ready for release in 2018. In April 2018, it was confirmed that Boyzone would release a new studio album and would tour the UK in 2019 with arena shows.

The album has an "urban" influence, as opposed to the ballads the band is famous for singing. Shane Lynch stated the album would be similar in style to that of American singer Charlie Puth. Ronan Keating said that each member picked three songs for the track listing, explaining: "Shane’s tracks have a very urban feel while mine have a country pop feel. There’s dance tracks, there’s rock tracks, so there are different flavours of all of us on this album." Duffy said "it's not a very structured record" but called the album "the best work we've ever done".

Gary Barlow, Calum Scott and Ed Sheeran contributed to the album. Sam Smith wrote a song for the album, but the track did not end up on the final track listing.

== Singles ==
- "Dream" was released on 15 June 2018, confirmed by the band in an interview with This Morning. It features the vocals of late Stephen Gately, who also co-wrote the song. The song was originally titled "I Can Dream" and was a B-side for the Gately single "Stay".
- "Because" was released on 26 July 2018 as the album's proper lead single
- "Love" was released on 4 October 2018 as the album's third single.
- "Normal Boy" was released to radio on 16 December 2018, added to the B-list at BBC Radio 2 as the album's fourth single.

== Critical reception ==
Professional ratings
Review scores
Source	Rating
Dorset Echo	9/10 stars
Instep, The News	3.5/5 stars

Lucy Mapstone reviewed the album and said it was one of the strongest albums the band has released. She commented:

"The irony is that the record is a real triumph, and serves as a frustrating reminder that there just aren't many bands of this pop-friendly caliber around these days. With a helping hand from songwriters Ed Sheeran and Gary Barlow, there is little here that under-delivers, and the four singers have given it their all with a collection of tracks that will keep fans happy for years. Love, penned by Barlow, is an anthem, in keeping with Boyzone's ballad-friendly style, while Normal Boy is a peppier effort, reminiscent of their 1997 hit Picture Of You. Because, by Sheeran, is all bouncy guitars and clever lyrics, and it works for lead singer Ronan Keating's honeyed vocals. Dream, created from a 2002 demo of Gately's and reworked with the band harmonising alongside him, is touchingly beautiful and will take fans back to their 1990s heyday. The band are certainly bowing out on a high, and have delivered one of the strongest albums of their career."

== Tour ==
The band embarked on the Thank You & Goodnight Tour to promote the album, which was also their last tour.

== Track listing ==
No.	Title	Writer(s)	Producer(s)	Length
1.	"Normal Boy" (lead vocals: Keating, Graham, Lynch)	Toby Scott; Andy Robinson; Connor Knight; Daniel Zak Watts	Scott	3:26
2.	"Because" (lead vocals: Keating)	John Shanks; Ronan Keating; Ed Sheeran; Amy Wadge	Shanks	2:47
3.	"Love" (lead vocals: Keating, Graham)	Gary Barlow; Shanks	Shanks	3:14
4.	"Talk" (lead vocals: Keating)	Frank Nobel; Linus Nordstrom	Shanks	3:56
5.	"Tongue Tied" (lead vocals: Keating, Lynch featuring Alesha Dixon)	Nobel; Andrew Bullimore; Camille Purcell; Nordstrom; David Ezra	Goldfingers	2:58
6.	"Talk About Love" (lead vocals: Keating, Lynch)	Nobel; Phil Plested; Chiara Hunter; Nordstrom; Ezra; Alex Stacey	Goldfingers	3:38
7.	"Loaded Gun" (lead vocals: Keating, Duffy)	Daniel Davidsen; Peter Wallevik; Mich Hansen; Ed Drewett; Purcell	Davidsen; Wallevik; Cutfather	3:29
8.	"You're Criminal" (lead vocals: Graham)	Neil Ormandy; Steven Solomon; James Taylor-Watts	Solomon; Lee McCutcheon^{[a]}	3:00
9.	"The Joke Is on Me" (lead vocals: Keating, Duffy)	Tim Woodcock; Daniel Goudie; Ashley Milton; Calum Scott	Shanks; Scott^{[a]}	3:09
10.	"Symphony of Hearts" (lead vocals: Duffy, Keating)	Paul Harris; Carl Ryden; Ross Golan	Scott	3:38
11.	"Learn to Love Again" (lead vocals: Lynch, Keating)	Chris Loco; Alex Issak	Loco	3:43
12.	"Dream" (lead vocals: Keating, Graham featuring Stephen Gately)	Tim Hawes; Keith Duffy; Keating; Pete Kirtley; Stephen Gately; Shane Lynch; Mikey Graham	Scott; Kirtley	3:23
Total length:				40:21

Notes

- ^a signifies an additional producer

== Charts ==
=== Weekly charts ===
Chart (2018)	Peak position
Irish Albums (IRMA)	10
Scottish Albums (Official Charts)	4
Taiwanese Albums (G-Music)	13
UK Albums (Official Charts)	6

=== Year-end charts ===
Chart (2018)	Position
UK Albums (OCC)	81

== Certifications ==
Region	Certification	Certified units/sales
United Kingdom (BPI)	Silver	60,000^{‡}
^{‡} Sales+streaming figures based on certification alone.
