= Dermot Bolger =

Irish writer (born 1959)

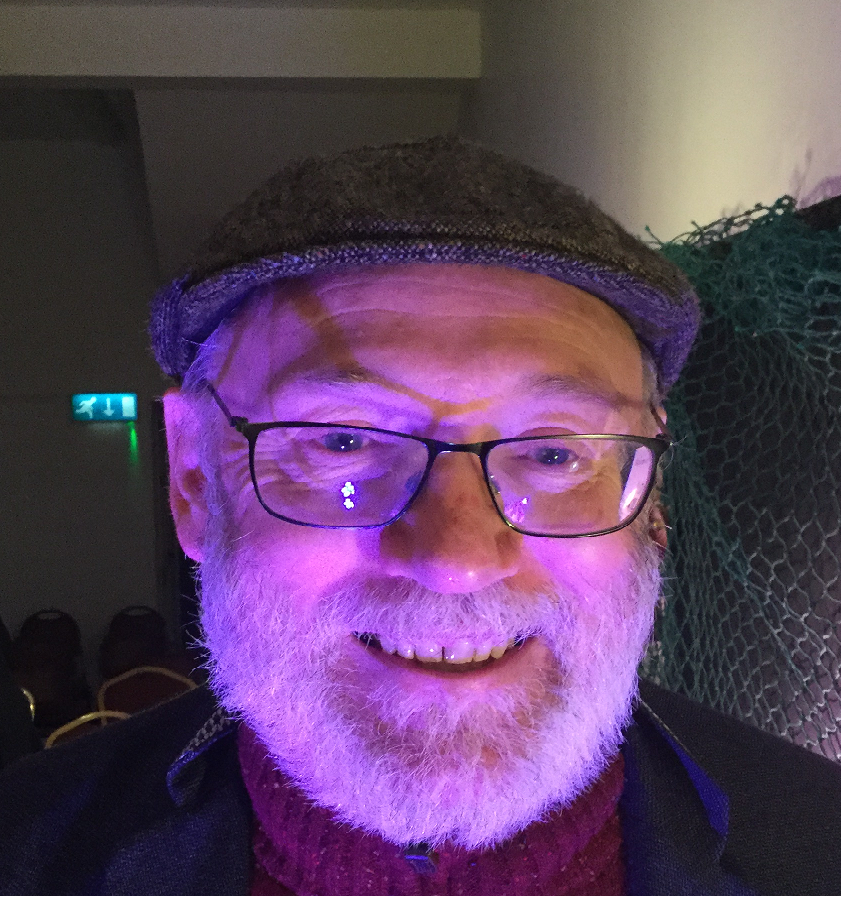
- Bolger at the Listowel Literary Festival
- Born: 1959 (age 66–67); Finglas, Ireland
- Occupations: Novelist; playwright; poet; editor
- Relatives: June Considine (sister)
- Website: dermotbolger.com

Dermot Bolger (born 1959) is an Irish novelist, playwright, poet and editor from Dublin, Ireland.

Bolger is the author of fourteen novels, including The Journey Home, The Family on Paradise Pier, The Lonely Sea and Sky and An Ark of Light. His latest novel, Hide Away, was published in 2024.

He is a member of the artist's association Aosdána.

== Early life ==
Bolger was born in the Finglas suburb of Dublin in 1959. His older sister is the writer June Considine.

As an eighteen-year-old factory worker in 1977, Bolger set up Raven Arts Press, which published early books by writers like Patrick McCabe, Colm Toibin, Sara Berkeley, Fintan O’Toole, Eoin McNamee, Kathryn Holmquist, Michael O'Loughlin, Sebastian Barry and Rosita Boland as well as the first English language translations of Nuala Ni Dhomhnaill before its closing in 1993. A partial archive of the press at the University of Delaware calls Raven Arts "one of the most important publishers of literature in Ireland during the last part of the twentieth century."

== Career ==
Bolger's early work is set in the working-class Dublin suburb of Finglas and in the nearby high-rise Ballymun tower blocks.

Two novels, The Family on Paradise Pier and An Ark of Light, chronicle the fate of a real Anglo-Irish family, The Goold-Verschoyles, some of whom embrace Communism in the 1930s with tragic consequences. While the first novel chronicles the fate of the family until 1948, the second novel focuses on the daughter, who defies convention in 1950s Ireland by leaving a failed marriage to embark on a journey of self-discovery from teeming Moroccan streets to a caravan that becomes an ark for all those whom she befriends amid the fields of Mayo. An Ark of Light explores a mother's anxiety for her gay son in a world where homosexuality was still illegal.

Bolger's novel, The Lonely Sea and Sky, uses the real-life story of a wartime sea rescue, by the unarmed crew of a tiny Wexford ship, The M.V. Kerlogue, of German sailors from the Navy who had previously tried to sink them. His novel, Tanglewood, which explores the collapse of the Celtic Tiger, was described by Colum McCann in the Irish Independent as "a superb novel about the implosion not only of the economy in the mid-2000s, but the implosion of marriage and morality and memory too."

Bolger adapted James Joyce's novel, Ulysses, for the stage. It was first staged by the Tron Theatre in Glasgow in 2012, who toured it to China in 2014. In 2017 it was staged by the Abbey Theatre in Dublin, who revived their production for a second run in 2018.

In May 2022, Bolger received an honorary doctorate in literature from the National University of Ireland, in a ceremony at the Royal College of Physicians in Dublin. At the ceremony, a similar honorary doctorate was conferred on Marie Heaney.

== As Publisher ==
In 1988, Bolger published Paddy Doyle's memoir, The God Squad (1988), which is described in The Cambridge History of Irish Literature (page 468) as "an exposé of the institutional regime to which outcast children were subjected by religious caregivers."

Raven Arts Press followed this up with another exposé, this time about Irish Industrial Schools in Patrick Galvin's memoir Song for a Raggy Boy (1991). The book was made into a 2003 film of the same name, directed by Aisling Walsh. The film, according to The Cambridge History of Irish Literature (page 553) "focuses on how a lay teacher responds to the verbal and physical abuse doled out by the Christian Brothers in a reformatory school."

Bolger ran Raven Arts Press until 1992, when he co-founded New Island Books with Edwin Higel to continue to support new Irish writers.

Since 1989, Bolger has acted as associate editor of the "New Irish Writing" page, which has been edited by Ciaran Carty in a succession of Irish newspapers since 1989, continuing a tradition started by David Marcus in 1969 in the now-defunct The Irish Press. The page is currently hosted by the Irish Independent.

== Writing ==
=== Novels ===
- 1985: Night Shift
- 1987 and 1991: The Woman’s Daughter
- 1990: The Journey HOme
- 1992: Emily’s Shoes
- 1994: A Second Life
- 1997: Father's Music
- 2000: Temptation
- 2007: The Valparaiso Voyage
- 2005: The Family on Paradise Pier (a story about Brian Goold-Verschoyle)
- 2010: New Town Soul
- 2012: The Fall of Ireland
- 2015: Tanglewood
- 2016: The Lonely Sea and Sky (a coming-of-age novel about the wartime rescue by the Irish ship, The MV Kerlogue)
- 2018: An Ark of Light
- 2024: Hide Away

=== Short Story Collections ===
- 2020: Secrets Never Told
- 2026: Imperfect Strangers

=== Plays ===
- 1989: The Lament for Arthur Cleary
- 1990: Blinded by the Light
- 1990: In High Germany
- 1990: The Holy Ground
- 1991: One Last White Horse
- 1994: A Dublin Bloom
- 1995: April Bright
- 1999: The Passion of Jerome
- 2000: Consenting Adults
- 2004: A Dublin Bloom
- 2005: From these Green Heights
- 2006: The Townlands of Brazil
- 2007: Walking the Road
- 2008: The Consequences of Lightning
- 2010: The Parting Glass* (This stand-alone play is a follow-up, 20 years on, about the life of Eoin, the emigrant narrator of Bolger's earlier play, In High Germany.)
- 2012: Tea Chests and Dreams
- 2012: Ulysses: a stage adaptation of James Joyce's novel (Produced by the Tron Theatre, Glasgow, which toured Scotland and China)
- 2017: Ulysses: a revised and expanded stage adaption of Joyce's novel (Premiered at the Abbey Theatre, Dublin, as part of the 2017 Dublin Theatre Festival, Oct 2017)
- 2017: Bang Bang
- 2019: Last Orders at the Dockside Staged by the Abbey Theatre as part of the 2019 Dublin Theatre Festival
- 2020: A Hand of Jacks - A Monologue commissioned by the Abbey Theatre as part of a national response to COVID-19, entitled Dear Ireland where they asked fifty playwrights to each write one monologue and nominate an actor who would self-tape their performances from social isolation. Bolger's play was performed by Dawn Bradfield
- 2021: The Messenger - A one-woman play about the North Strand bombings in Dublin in 1941, streamed online by Axis, Ballymun, to mark the 80th anniversary of the bombing, directed by Mark O'Brien.
- 2024: Home, Boys, Home - Staged as part of the 2024 Dublin Theatre Festival

=== Poetry ===
- 1980: The Habit of Flesh, Raven Arts Press
- 1981: Finglas Lilies, Raven Arts Press
- 1982: No Waiting America, Raven Arts Press
- 1986: Internal Exiles, Dublin: Dolmen
- 1989: Leinster Street Ghosts, Raven Arts Press
- 1998: Taking my Letters Back, Dublin: New Island Books
- 2004: The Chosen Moment, Dublin: New Island Books
- 2008: External Affairs, Dublin: New Island Books, 80 pages. ISBN 978-1-84840-028-3
- 2012: The Venice Suite: A Voyage Through Loss, Dublin: New Island Books.
- 2015: That Which is Suddenly Precious: New & Selected Poems, Dublin: New Island Books.
- 2022: Other People's Lives, Dublin: New Island Books.

== Research work ==
- Alain Mouchel-Vallon, "La réécriture de l'histoire dans les Romans de Roddy Doyle, Dermot Bolger et Patrick McCabe" (PhD thesis, 2005, Reims University, France).
- Damien Shortt, "The State of the Nation: Paradigms of Irishness in the Drama and Fiction of Dermot Bolger" (PhD thesis, 2006, Mary Immaculate College, University of Limerick, Ireland).
- Ryan, Ray. Ireland and Scotland: Literature and Culture, State and Nation, 1966–2000. Oxford University Press, 2002.
- Paschel, Ulrike: No Mean City?: the image of Dublin in the novels of Dermot Bolger, Roddy Doyle and Val Mulkerns. Frankfurt am Main [u.a.]: Lang, 1998. – X, 170 S. (Aachen British and American studies; 1). ISBN 3-631-33530-X
- Merriman, Vic: "Staging contemporary Ireland: heartsickness and hopes deferred". In: Shaun Richards (ed.), The Cambridge Companion to Contemporary Irish Drama. Cambridge: Cambridge University Press, 2004; pp. 244–257 (On The Lament for Arthur Cleary, 1989).
- Murphy, Paul: "Inside the immigrant mind : nostalgic versus nomadic subjectivities in late twentieth-century Irish drama". In: Australasian Drama Studies, 43 (October 2003), pp. 128–147 (On A Dublin Quartet).
- Tew, Philip: "The lexicon of youth in Mac Laverty, Bolger, and Doyle: Theorizing contemporary Irish fiction via Lefebvre's Tenth Prelude". In: Hungarian Journal of English and American Studies, 5:1 (1999), pp. 181–197.
- Harte, Liam: "A kind of scab: Irish identity in the writings of Dermot Bolger and Joseph O'Connor". In: Irish Studies Review, 20 (1997 autumn), pp. 17–22.
- MacCarthy, Conor: "Ideology and geography in Dermot Bolger's The Journey Home". In: Irish University Review, 27:1 (1997 Spring-Summer), pp. 98–110.
- Merriman, Vic: "Centring the wanderer: Europe as active imaginary in contemporary Irish theatre". In: Irish University Review: a journal of Irish studies, 27:1 (1997 Spring-Summer), pp. 166–181 (On The Lament for Arthur Cleary).
- Aragay, Mireia: "Reading Dermot Bolger's The Holy Ground: national identity, gender and sexuality in post-colonial Ireland". In: Links and Letters, 4 (1997), pp. 53–64.
- Turner, Tramble T.: "Staging signs of gender". In: John Deely (ed.), Semiotics 1994: Annual proceedings volumes of the Semiotic Society of America. 19. New York: Lang, 1995. pp. 335–344 (On The Lament for Arthur Cleary, 1989).
- Dantanus, Ulf.: "Antæus in Dublin?" In: Moderna språk (97:1), 2003, pp. 37–52.
- Battaglia, Alberto.: Dublino: oltre Joyce. Milan: Unicopli, 2002. pp. 130 (Città letterarie).
- Dumay, Émile-Jean.: "Dermot Bolger dramaturge". In: Études irlandaises (27:1) 2002, pp. 79–92.
- Dumay, Émile-Jean.: "La subversion de la nostalgie dans The Lament for Arthur Cleary de Dermot Bolger". In: Études irlandaises (21:2) 1996, pp. 111–23.
- Fiérobe, Claude: "Irlande et Europe 1990: The Journey Home de Dermot Bolger". In: Études irlandaises (19:2) 1994, pp. 41–49.
- Kearney, Colbert: "Dermot Bolger and the dual carriageway". In: Études irlandaises (19:2), 1994, pp. 25–39.
- Shortt, Damien: "A River Runs Through It: Irish History in Contemporary Fiction, Dermot Bolger and Roddy Doyle". In: Paddy Lyons; Alison O'Malley-Younger (eds), No Country for Old Men: Fresh Perspectives on Irish Literature. Frankfurt am Main [u.a.] Oxford u.a.: Lang, 2009. pp. 123–141 (Reimagining Ireland; 4).
- Murphy, Paula: "From Ballymun to Brazil: Bolger's Postmodern Ireland". In: Eamon Maher ... (eds), Modernity and Postmodernity in a Franco-Irish Context. Frankfurt am Main [u.a.]: Lang, 2008. pp. 161–178 (Studies in Franco-Irish Relations; 2).
- Shortt, Damien: "Dermot Bolger: Gender Performance and Society". In: Paula Murphy... (eds), New Voices in Irish literary Criticism. Lewiston, N.Y.; Lampeter: Edwin Mellen, 2007. pp. 151–166.
- Brihault, Jean: "Dermot Bolger, romancier de la mondialisation?" In: Yann Bévant ... (eds), Issues of Globalisation and Secularisation in France and Ireland. Frankfurt, M. [u.a.]: Lang, 2009. pp. 101–122 (Studies in Franco-Irish Relations; 3).
- Wald, Christina: "Dermot Bolger". In: Martin Middeke (ed.), The Methuen Drama Guide to Contemporary Irish Playwrights, London: Methuen Drama, 2010. pp. 19–36.
- Shortt, Damien: "Who put the ball in the English net: the privatisation of Irish postnationalism in Dermot Bolger's in High Germany". In: Irene Gilsenan Nordin; Carmen Zamorano Llena (eds), Redefinitions of Irish identity: a postnationalist approach. Frankfurt, M. [u.a.]: Lang, 2010. pp. 103–124 (Cultural identity studies; 12).
- Imhof, Rüdiger: "Dermot Bolger". In: The Modern Irish Novel: Irish Novelists after 1945. Rüdiger Imhof. Dublin : Wolfhound Press, 2002. pp. 267–285.
- Murphy, Paula: "Scattering us like seed: Dermot Bolger's postnationalist Ireland". In: Irene Gilsenan Nordin; Carmen Zamorano Llena (eds), Redefinitions of Irish Identity: a postnationalist approach. Frankfurt, M. [u.a.]: Lang, 2010. pp. 181–199 (Cultural identity studies; 12).
- Schreiber, Mark: "Playing it out – football and Irishness in contemporary Irish drama". In: Sandra Mayer; Julia Novak; Margarete Rubik (eds), Ireland in Drama, Film, and Popular Culture : Festschrift for Werner Huber. Trier: WVT Wissenschaftlicher Verl. Trier, 2012. pp. 83–89.
- Murphy, Paula: " 'Marooned men in foreign cities': encounters with the Other in Dermot Bolger's The Ballymun Trilogy". In: Pilar Villar-Argáiz (ed), Literary visions of multicultural Ireland: The immigrant in contemporary Irish literature. Manchester: Manchester University Press, 2014. pp. 151–162.
- Salis, Loredana: "Goodnight and joy be with you all: tales of contemporary Dublin city life". In: Pilar Villar-Argáiz (ed), Literary visions of multicultural Ireland: The immigrant in contemporary Irish literature. Manchester: Manchester University Press, 2014. pp. 243–254.
- Schrage-Früh, Michaela: "Like a foreigner / in my native land: transculturality and Otherness in twenty-first-century Irish poetry". In: Pilar Villar-Argáiz (ed), Literary visions of multicultural Ireland: The immigrant in contemporary Irish literature. Manchester: Manchester University Press, 2014. pp. 163–175.
- Mikowski, Sylvie: "Dermot Bolger et la Raven Arts Press: A loose coalition for change". In: Genet, Jacqueline (ed), Le livre en Irlande: l'imprimé en contexte. Caen: Presses Univ. de Caen, 2006. pp. 137–146.
- O'Brien, Cormac: "Unblessed Amongst Women: Performing Patriarchy Without Men in Contemporary Irish Theatre". In: Christopher Collins; Mary P. Caulfield (eds), Ireland, Memory and Performing the Historical Imagination. Basingstoke: Palgrave Macmillan, 2014. pp. 190–195.
- Grene, Nicholas: "Snapshots: A year in the life of a theatre judge". In: Donald E. Morse (ed), Irish theatre in transition: from the late nineteenth to the early twenty-first century. Basingstoke: Palgrave Macmillan, 2015. pp. 175–176.
- Müller, Sonja: Von der georgianischen Ära bis zum Zeitalter des keltischen Tigers: der Wandel der Stadtdarstellung im Dublinroman. Berlin: Lit, 2015. – pp. 263–285 (Erlanger Studien zur Anglistik und Amerikanistik; 16). ISBN 978-3-643-13008-2
- Kilroy, Claire: "Dermot Bolger: Tanglewood". In: Times Literary Supplement (5857) 2015, pp. 26.
- Phillips, Terry: Irish Literature and the First World War: Culture, Identity and Memory. Frankfurt am Main [u.a.] Oxford u.a.: Lang, 2015. pp. 255–260, 261 (Reimagining Ireland; 72). ISBN 978-3-0343-1969-0 (On Walking the Road).
- Hanrahan, Anna: Narrating the Ballymun Experience in Dermot Bolger's Ballymun Trilogy. Trier : Wissenschaftlicher Verlag Trier, 2016. pp. 99–114 (Irish Studies in Europe; 7). ISBN 978-3-86821-652-3.
