= Because =

Because may refer to:

- Because, a subordinating grammatical conjunction
- Causality, the process of making something happen; a relationship between events
- ∵, a logical symbol meaning because
- Because (film), a British film directed by Sidney Morgan
- Because, a 1990 film written and directed by Tom Tykwer
- BECAUSE (Conference), a conference for bisexual and bi+ people
- "Because" (McAuley poem), a 1968 poem by James McAuley

In music:

- "Because" (1902 song), a popular song by Guy d'Hardelot and Edward Teschemacher, recorded by many artists
- "Because" (The Beatles song)
- "Because" (Boyzone song)
- "Because" (The Dave Clark Five song)
- "Because" (Demis Roussos song)
- "Because" (Jessica Mauboy song)
- Because, an album by The Nylons
- "BEcause" [sic], a song by Dreamcatcher from Summer Holiday
