= Coz =

Coz may refer to:

- Claude Le Coz (1740-1815), French Catholic bishop
- Coz Kerrigan (21st century), British musician
- David Gutiérrez de Coz (born 1980), Spanish football (soccer) defender
- Cozumel, Mexico

== See also ==
- Because (disambiguation)
