= Stephen Gately =

Irish pop singer (1976–2009)

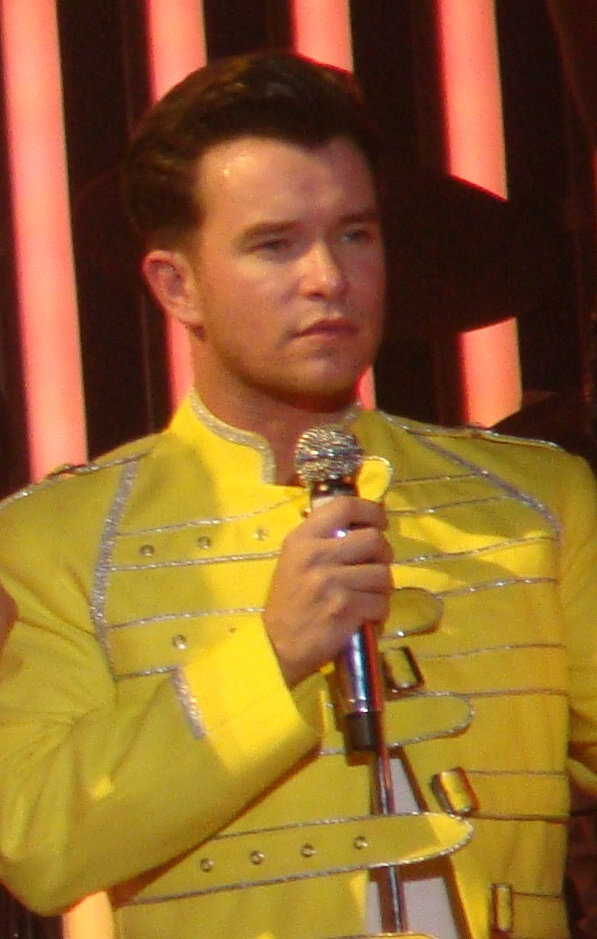
- Gately in 2009
- Born: Stephen Patrick David Gately; 17 March 1976; Dublin, Ireland
- Died: 10 October 2009 (aged 33); Port d'Andratx, Mallorca, Spain
- Occupations: Singer; songwriter
- Years active: 1993–2009
- Spouse: Andrew Cowles (m. 2006)
- Musical career
- Genre: Pop
- Instrument: Vocals
- Formerly of: Boyzone
- Website: stephengately.co.uk

Stephen Patrick David Gately (17 March 1976 – 10 October 2009) was an Irish singer who, with Ronan Keating, was co-lead singer of the pop group Boyzone. All of Boyzone's studio albums during Gately's lifetime hit number one in the United Kingdom, their third being their most successful internationally. With Boyzone, Gately had a record-breaking sixteen-consecutive singles enter the top five of the UK Singles Chart. He released a solo album in 2000, after the group's initial break-up, which charted in the UK top ten and yielded three UK hit singles, including the top three hit "New Beginning". Gately went on to appear in stage productions and on television programmes as well as contributing songs to various projects. In 2008, he rejoined his colleagues as Boyzone reformed for a series of concerts and recordings.

Gately made his sexuality known in 1999 and came out to publicity. He became publicly committed to Andrew Cowles, first in a commitment ceremony in Las Vegas in 2003 and more formally in a civil partnership ceremony in London in 2006. Upon Boyzone's reformation, Gately featured as part of the first gay couple in a boyband music video for "Better", in what was to be his last with the band. Gately died of a congenital heart defect in a flat that he and Cowles owned in Mallorca, Spain, in 2009. Brian Boyd in The Irish Times stated: "Stephen Gately's death represents the first time that the boyband genre has had to deal with such a tragic situation". Tim Teeman of The Times (UK) heralded Gately as a hero of gay rights for his response to being "smoked out of the closet".

== Early life ==
Gately grew up in relative poverty in the working-class Sheriff Street area of Dublin. He was the fourth of five children; his father Martin was a decorator and his mother, Margaret (born 1949) a cleaner. His siblings are Michelle, Tony, Alan and Mark. He was particularly close to sister Michelle throughout his life. Gately's father had an accident as a result of which he had to be hospitalised for three months from September 2004. His mother then took over as full-time carer. Gately attended primary school at St Laurence O'Toole's and secondary school at North Strand Technical College. As a teenager he appeared in various musicals and theatre performances at school, such as Juno and the Paycock. He was estranged from his parents for years, but reconciled with them in 2008 and visited them with Andrew Cowles that year.

== Career ==
=== Boyzone ===
Gately joined Boyzone upon their formation in 1993. The group became known in Ireland after an infamous appearance on The Late Late Show that year, which presenter Gay Byrne dismissed—although he later concluded: "They certainly had the last laugh on us". Boyzone's first success outside Ireland was when the song "Love Me for a Reason" reached number two in the UK Singles Chart in 1995. The group split suddenly following a string of performances in Dublin's Point Theatre in 2000. By the time Boyzone originally rested the band, they had achieved six number ones on the UK Singles Chart. They were considered a major pop band of the 1990s and had a much publicised rivalry with UK boy band Take That, even selling more singles than them. Gately shared the majority of lead vocal work with Ronan Keating.

A February appearance at the 2008 Meteor Awards relaunched the reformed Boyzone, with touring taking place throughout 2008. After his death, manager Louis Walsh described Gately as "the glue in Boyzone, he kept them all together". Keating informed the congregation at Gately's funeral that he had nicknames for them all; "the campest straight band in the world"—Rosaleen, Michaela, Kitty, Shanice and Stephanie.

=== Solo career ===
After success with Boyzone, the band decided in 2000 to move on to solo projects. Gately was the second, with his debut solo single, "New Beginning", released on 29 May 2000. The single reached number three in the UK charts.

Two weeks later the album New Beginning was released and entered the charts. The album included twelve tracks including a version of the classic "Bright Eyes", which he recorded for the soundtrack to the TV version of Watership Down. He also voiced one of the characters in the series, Blackavar, which was created to look like him. His character only spoke for 3 episodes, before becoming a background character.

The second single taken from the album was "I Believe". Released on 2 October 2000, this song also featured on the soundtrack to the film Billy Elliot. The single just missed the UK top ten, peaking at number eleven. He attended the premieres of the film both at the Edinburgh Film Festival and at the Empire, Leicester Square, along with the stars of the film, Julie Walters and Jamie Bell. In May 2001, Gately's third single, "Stay", was released and reached number thirteen in the UK chart. That month, with his single still in the charts, his record company Polydor dropped him from the label.

=== Boyzone's reformation and final projects ===
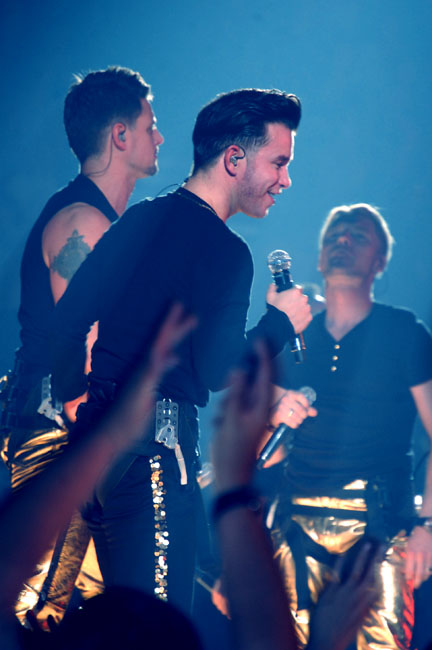
Gately in 2009

In 2008 following his solo career and various bouts of acting and television appearances, Gately rejoined his old colleagues when Boyzone reformed, following the success of revived contemporaries Take That. Gately had been the most eager to reform and urged his bandmates to come together again. They sold out two more tours of the United Kingdom.

Boyzone released a brand new single, "Love You Anyway", followed by a new compilation album in October 2008. December 2008 saw the release of a second new single, "Better". The video for the song generated controversy, as scenes depicting romantic couples included a shot of two men embracing, in an inclusive nod to Gately's homosexuality. The group unanimously agreed that Gately should be allowed to pair with a male actor. It was condemned by, among others, the minister of the Dromore Reformed Presbyterian Church. Others, however, cite that milestone as among the reasons why Gately is a "gay rights hero". Wrote Tim Teeman of the Times Online, "Gately showed that an unflamboyant guy could be a pop star and gay...the real shame should be reserved for those managers and showbusiness power-brokers who practise that kind of discrimination, and also maintain the closet, to line their pockets."

At the time of Gately's death the group had selected thirty songs which they intended to record for a new album to be released in 2010. This was to have been followed by a tour.

Gately's vocals featured on Boyzone's final album, in a song called "I Can Dream". A video of the song was released on 15 June 2018, featuring images of Gately and Boyzone. The album was released on 16 November 2018.

== Other work ==
=== Acting and television ===
In 1999 Gately took part in animated television series Watership Down, where he voiced Blackavar and performed show's theme song, a cover of Art Garfunkel's "Bright Eyes" (included in the previous adaptation from 1978).

In December 2002, Gately took the lead role in Bill Kenwright's new production of Tim Rice and Andrew Lloyd Webber's Joseph and the Amazing Technicolor Dreamcoat, which previewed in Oxford in December 2002 before moving to Liverpool over Christmas 2002 and finally to London's West End and the New London Theatre in Drury Lane in February 2003. From September 2004 until March 2005 Gately played the Child Catcher in Chitty Chitty Bang Bang at the London Palladium.

In 2001 he made a cameo as himself in the fourth series of BBC sitcom Absolutely Fabulous, in that series' opening episode "Parralox".

Gately made his pantomime debut at the Churchill Theatre in Bromley in December 2005 starring as Dandini in Cinderella. In April 2006 he took on the role of The Scarecrow in The Wizard of Oz at the Marlowe Theatre, Canterbury.

Gately also took part in Channel Five's All Star Talent Show in October 2006, performing the slice and dice magic trick which he only had a week to learn, coming second to Toby Anstis. He was also in the second series of ITV's Dancing on Ice with his dancing partner Kristina Lenko. They went out in eighth place on 10 February 2007.

In January 2007, Gately was heard in "Horror of Glam Rock", a Doctor Who audio drama produced by Big Finish Productions for BBC7. For this audio play, Gately recorded an original song, "Children of Tomorrow", with music by Tim Sutton and lyrics by Barnaby Edwards; this was his first solo track since 2001.

In September 2007, Gately began touring the UK in an 11-week run of Stephen Schwartz's rock musical Godspell but withdrew from the production after just three weeks for contractual reasons.

In 2008, Gately appeared in the independent horror film, Credo, which was released in the United States as Devil's Curse.

=== Philanthropy ===
Gately was a vice patron of the charity Missing People (formerly National Missing Persons Helpline), supporting their Runaway Helpline service for young people. He was an ambassador for the Caudwell Children Charity in Stoke and on one occasion gave a private Christmas performance, raising thousands of pounds. Gately's family requested that donations be given to the charity instead of flowers sent to them after his death in 2009. This in turn raised thousands more pounds. On one visit to a hospital he met a terminally ill child who admired the jacket he was wearing, and Gately allowed her to have it.

=== Writing ===
During the three years prior to his death, Gately had been writing a children's fantasy novel called The Tree of Seasons. In an April 2009 interview with the Press Association he declared that he was nearly finished, had publisher interest, and hoped for a Christmas 2009 release. Boyzone bandmate Ronan Keating promised at Gately's funeral that "by hook or by crook" the book would be finished.

The Tree of Seasons was written in collaboration with June Considine and Jules Williams. Based on Gately's handwritten notes – the day he died he had just worked out the ending. The book released in the UK and Ireland on 13 May 2010, published by Hodder & Stoughton. It contains a foreword by Elton John and David Furnish, and is illustrated by Keith Wilson. The Tree of Seasons remained a bestseller and a top-ten seller for three consecutive weeks. The paperback version was released in April 2011.

== Personal life ==
Gately came out as gay in 1999 after discovering that an acquaintance was about to sell the details of his sexuality to the media.

From 2000 to 2002, Gately suffered from depression and addiction to prescription drugs.

Gately started dating Andrew Cowles, an internet businessman who had been introduced to him by mutual friends Elton John and David Furnish. Gately and Cowles held a commitment ceremony in a wedding chapel while on holiday in Las Vegas in 2003. On 19 March 2006, Gately entered into a civil partnership with Cowles in a ceremony in London. The couple lived together in the north London village of Highgate. Gately spoke of his love for the village, saying he "wouldn't move away for the world. It has a great vibe and the people here are brilliant". In July 2009, their home was broken into by thieves who took £80,000 of items, including a Rolex watch which Gately had purchased with his first pay cheque. Gately was based in London for the rest of his life.

His manager Louis Walsh was unaware of Gately's sexuality when he selected him for Boyzone and has said that, had he known, he would have thought twice before picking him, claiming less than a year before his death that "it wasn't cool then to have a gay guy in a band". After the singer's death, Walsh described Gately as his "very, very best friend", saying: "Of all the people I've worked with I don't think anybody thanked me as much as Stephen. He used to always say to me, 'If I wasn't in Boyzone I don't know where I'd be today, thank you'".

Gately's idol was Michael Jackson, whom he met at RDS Arena in 1997 when Jackson was embarking on his HIStory World Tour.

== Death ==
Gately died at his home in Port d'Andratx, Mallorca, early on 10 October 2009. His body was discovered later in the morning. His death was later determined to have been caused by a pulmonary oedema resulting from an undiagnosed heart condition.

Gately had spent the evening with his partner Cowles at the Black Cat club in Mallorca's capital, Palma. They returned home with a man that they had met that night, Bulgarian national Georgi Dochev. Dochev stayed in the spare bedroom. According to Dochev, he discovered Gately's body lying on a sofa as he was about to leave. He woke Cowles, who was sleeping alone in the couple's bedroom. However, Gately's solicitor and family friend, Gerald Kean, insisted Cowles was the one who found Gately's body. Spanish police were alerted at 1:45 pm by Cowles, after he had tried to revive Gately. Gately was squatting in an awkward position on the sofa, dressed in his pyjamas. Police said they had no reason to believe the death was related to abuse of substances, and no suicide note or signs of violence were found on his body.

The surviving members of Boyzone flew to Mallorca on 11 October 2009. The remaining members of Boyzone, Keith Duffy, Michael Graham, Ronan Keating, and Shane Lynch, issued a joint statement:

We are completely devastated by the loss of our friend and brother, Stephen. We have shared such wonderful times together over the years and were all looking forward to sharing many more. Stephen was a beautiful person in both body and spirit. He lit up our lives and those of the many friends he had all over the world. Our love and sympathy go out to Andrew and Stephen's family. We love you and will miss you forever, 'Steo'.

A post-mortem and toxicology tests took place on 13 October and this examination showed that Gately died of natural causes. His death was a result of a congenital heart defect.

On 16 October, accompanied by the four remaining members of Boyzone, his body was brought from Mallorca to Dublin where his funeral took place at St Laurence O'Toole's Church, Seville Place the following day. The four surviving members of Boyzone maintained an overnight vigil in the church the night before. Thousands of fans, celebrities, and politicians were in attendance at the funeral. Fans had travelled from as far as South Africa, and Taiwan to attend the funeral. He was cremated in a private ceremony later that afternoon. Gately's coffin was carried into and out of the church by his bandmates, and during the service Ronan Keating gave a eulogy, during which he broke down several times and apologised to the congregation. Keith Duffy reminisced on the early days: "He told Louis [Walsh] he was 5ft 7in (170 cm). When he auditioned for The Hobbit later on, he said he was 5ft 3in (160 cm). But he was a true giant of a man". Michael Graham said Gately had only told him the previous week how much he loved Cowles, adding: "When he came out, he finally became himself". The funeral clashed with the wedding of a niece of Bertie Ahern and several of her guests defected to the funeral instead.

=== Reaction ===
Fans responded with messages of sympathy on Twitter and Facebook. Thousands of pounds were donated by fans to a Stoke-based children's charity which Gately had endorsed. Boyzone's record catalogue was propelled back into the music charts. The single "No Matter What", on which Gately is a prominent vocalist, received heavy play on radio.

Boyzone's former manager Louis Walsh said: "We're all absolutely devastated. I'm in complete shock. I was only with him on Monday at an awards ceremony. We don't know much about what's happened yet. I only heard after The X Factor (UK television talent show on which Walsh is a judge) and we will rally around each other this week. He was a great man." My First Time, a stage show which was set to star bandmember Keith Duffy, was cancelled entirely. The four surviving members of Boyzone had memorial tattoos when they brought Gately's body home.

Irish boy band Westlife said: "We are, like everyone else, in shock today. We met Stephen Gately back in 1998 when we first started out and since then had the pleasure of meeting him many times. Himself and the Boyzone lads paved the way for us as a band. Our thoughts are with Andy and the rest of his family, his friends, his legions of fans and of course his bandmates Keith, Mikey, Shane and Ronan who will be devastated at the loss of a truly beautiful person." Former Taoiseach Bertie Ahern said: "It's so sad. Boyzone and Stephen, they've all been part of Irish life and far wider than that, the last 15 years, and so successful, so it's a huge, huge tragedy. He was 33 years of age, 15 years at the top, a fine musician, it's just a huge tragedy to Irish entertainment, Irish music and further afield as well".

==== Daily Mail article ====
An article by Jan Moir in the Daily Mail on 16 October 2009 claimed: "Healthy and fit 33-year-old men do not just climb into their pyjamas and go to sleep on the sofa, never to wake up again. Whatever the cause of death is, it is not, by any yardstick, a natural one." She suggested that drugs and a "dangerous lifestyle" were to blame for Gately's death.

Moir's article resulted in over 25,000 complaints to the Press Complaints Commission (PCC) that day. The article was widely criticised in the media. The PCC did not uphold the complaint, stating: "It found the article caused some offence but there was insufficient evidence it breached the law".

=== Legacy ===
In September 2020, Dublin City Council agreed to name "Stephen Gately Park" after the singer. This has yet to be enacted, due to Dublin City Council regulations that require a person to be dead for at least 20 years before a place can be named after them.

== Discography ==
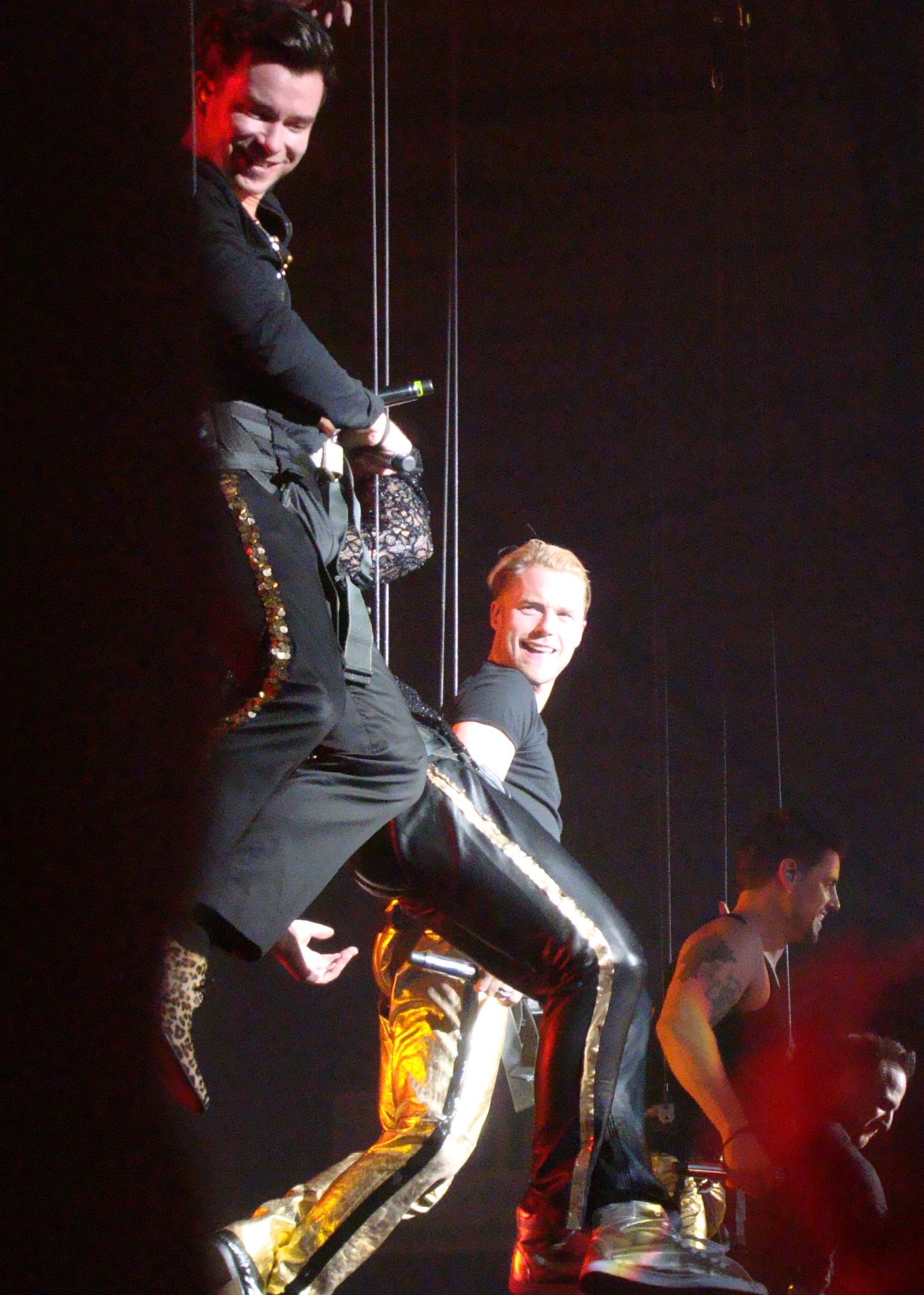
Gately performing with Boyzone in 2009

=== With Boyzone ===
- Said and Done (1995)
- A Different Beat (1996)
- Where We Belong (1998)

=== Solo ===
Albums

List of albums, with peak chart positions
| Title | Album details | Peak chart positions |
| Title | Album details | UK |
|---|---|---|
| New Beginning | Released: 2000; Format: CD; Label: Universal Music | 9 |

Singles

| Year | Title | Peak chart positions | | |
| Year | Title | IRE | UK | AUS |
|---|---|---|---|---|
| 2000 | "New Beginning"/"Bright Eyes" | 8 | 3 | 92 |
| 2000 | "I Believe" | — | 11 | — |
| 2001 | "Stay" | — | 13 | — |
| 2007 | "Children of Tomorrow" | — | — | — |
| 2010 | "Gave It All Away" (with Boyzone) | 1 | 9 | 42 |
| 2018 | "Dream" (with Boyzone) | — | — | — |

=== Other appearances ===
| Year | Title | Album |
|---|---|---|
| 1999 | "Chiquitita" | From the ABBAmania compilation album |
| 2009 | "Little Drummer Boy" (duet with Ronan Keating) | Winter Songs |

== Filmography ==
=== Audio ===
| Year | Title | Role | Notes |
|---|---|---|---|
| 2007 | Doctor Who: Horror of Glam Rock | Tommy Tomorrow | BBC Radio 7 |

=== Film ===
| Year | Title | Role | Notes |
|---|---|---|---|
| 1992 | The Bargain Shop | Locusts | |
| 2008 | Credo | Simon | |

=== Television ===
| Year | Title | Role | Notes |
|---|---|---|---|
| 1998 | Boyzone: Live In Your Living Room | Himself | 1 Episode |
| 1999 | Watership Down | Blackavar | 3 Episodes |
| 2001 | Absolutely Fabulous | Himself | Series 4 |
| 2007 | Dancing on Ice | Himself | 4 episodes (finished 8th) |
| 2008 | The Boyz Are Back In Town | Himself | Documentary |
| 2008 | The Sunday Night Project | Guest Host | 1 episode |
| 2025 | Boyzone: No Matter What | Archive Footage | 3 episodes |

== Books ==
- The Tree of Seasons (2010)
