= New Beginning (Stephen Gately album) =

Studio album by Stephen Gately
- Released: 26 June 2000
- Recorded: 1999–2000
- Genre: Pop
- Length: 43:31
- Label: Polydor
- Producers: Anders Bagge, Anders Barrén, Arnthor Birgisson, Bloodshy, Jeremy Godfrey, Steve Mac, Stargate, Carl Sturken, Evan Rogers, Bill Padley, Jany Schella

Singles from New Beginning
- 1. "New Beginning/Bright Eyes" Released: 10 June 2000; 2. "I Believe" Released: 14 October 2000; 3. "Stay" Released: 12 May 2001

New Beginning is the debut and only solo studio album released by Irish singer-songwriter and Boyzone singer, Stephen Gately. The album was released by Universal on 26 June 2000. The release marked his last official studio release, solo or with Boyzone, due to his death on 10 October 2009. The album peaked at number nine on the UK Albums Chart. Three singles were released from the album: "New Beginning", "I Believe" and "Stay".

== Track listing ==
UK edition
No.	Title	Writer(s)	Producer(s)	Length
1.	"New Beginning"	Anders Bagge, Arnthor Birgisson, Simon Climie, Stephen Gately	Bag & Arnthor	3:41
2.	"I Believe"	Steve Mac, Wayne Hector	Mac	3:29
3.	"If Only You Were Here"	Bagge, Birgisson, Christian Karlsson, Paul Tucker, Gately	Bag & Arnthor, Bloodshy	4:02
4.	"Stay"	Hallgeir Rustan, Mikkel S. Eriksen	Stargate	3:55
5.	"Wanna Be Where You Are"	Carl Sturken, Evan Rogers	Sturken, Rogers, Jeremy Godfrey^{[a]}, Bill Padley^{[a]}	4:00
6.	"Where Do We Go"	Bagge, Birgisson, Karlsson, Tucker, Gately	Bag & Arnthor, Bloodshy	4:39
7.	"Judgement Day"	Bagge, Birgisson, Gately	Bag & Arnthor, Bloodshy	4:07
8.	"You Lied"	Anders Barrén, Jany Schella, Tucker, Gately	Barrén, Jany	4:28
9.	"Far from Love"	Rustan, Eriksen, Tor Erik Hermansen, Gately	Stargate	3:55
10.	"Just Can't Say Goodbye"	Rustan, Eriksen, Hermansen, Gately	Stargate	4:08
11.	"Do Without Me"	Schella, Luciano Peirone	Barrén, Jany	4:28
12.	"Coming Back"	Barrén, Schella, Peirone	Mac	4:04
13.	"Bright Eyes"	Mike Batt	Mac	3:46

UK second edition
No.	Title	Writer(s)	Producer(s)	Length
1.	"New Beginning"	Anders Bagge, Arnthor Birgisson, Simon Climie, Stephen Gately	Bag & Arnthor	3:41
2.	"I Believe"	Steve Mac, Wayne Hector	Mac	3:29
3.	"If Only You Were Here"	Bagge, Birgisson, Christian Karlsson, Paul Tucker, Gately	Bag & Arnthor, Bloodshy	4:02
4.	"Stay"	Hallgeir Rustan, Mikkel S. Eriksen	Stargate	3:55
5.	"Wanna Be Where You Are"	Carl Sturken, Evan Rogers	Sturken, Rogers, Jeremy Godfrey^{[a]}, Bill Padley^{[a]}	4:00
6.	"Where Do We Go"	Bagge, Birgisson, Karlsson, Tucker, Gately	Bag & Arnthor, Bloodshy	4:39
7.	"Judgement Day"	Bagge, Birgisson, Gately	Bag & Arnthor, Bloodshy	4:07
8.	"You Lied"	Anders Barrén, Jany Schella, Tucker, Gately	Barrén, Jany	4:28
9.	"Far from Love"	Rustan, Eriksen, Tor Erik Hermansen, Gately	Stargate	3:55
10.	"Just Can't Say Goodbye"	Rustan, Eriksen, Hermansen, Gately	Stargate	4:08
11.	"Do Without Me"	Schella, Luciano Peirone	Barrén, Jany	4:28
12.	"Coming Back"	Barrén, Schella, Peirone	Mac	4:04

European edition
No.	Title	Writer(s)	Producer(s)	Length
1.	"New Beginning"	Anders Bagge, Arnthor Birgisson, Simon Climie, Stephen Gately	Bag & Arnthor	3:41
2.	"I Believe"	Steve Mac, Wayne Hector	Mac	3:29
3.	"If Only You Were Here"	Bagge, Birgisson, Christian Karlsson, Paul Tucker, Gately	Bag & Arnthor, Bloodshy	4:02
4.	"Stay"	Hallgeir Rustan, Mikkel S. Eriksen	Stargate	3:55
5.	"Wanna Be Where You Are"	Carl Sturken, Evan Rogers	Sturken, Rogers, Jeremy Godfrey^{[a]}, Bill Padley^{[a]}	4:00
6.	"Where Do We Go"	Bagge, Birgisson, Karlsson, Tucker, Gately	Bag & Arnthor, Bloodshy	4:39
7.	"Judgement Day"	Bagge, Birgisson, Gately	Bag & Arnthor, Bloodshy	4:07
8.	"You Lied"	Anders Barrén, Jany Schella, Tucker, Gately	Barrén, Jany	4:28
9.	"Far from Love"	Rustan, Eriksen, Tor Erik Hermansen, Gately	Stargate	3:55
10.	"Do Without Me"	Schella, Luciano Peirone	Barrén, Jany	4:28
11.	"Coming Back"	Barrén, Schella, Peirone	Mac	4:04
12.	"Bright Eyes"	Mike Batt	Mac	3:46

Japanese bonus tracks
No.	Title	Writer(s)	Producer(s)	Length
14.	"New Beginning" (Joey Musaphia's Dub Mix)	Anders Bagge, Arnthor Birgisson, Simon Climie, Stephen Gately	Bag & Arnthor, Joey Musaphia (remix)	7:06
15.	"New Beginning" (Love to Infinity Radio Mix)	Anders Bagge, Arnthor Birgisson, Simon Climie, Stephen Gately	Bag & Arnthor, Love to Infinity (remix)	3:43

Notes

- ^{^[a]} signifies an additional producer

== Charts ==
Chart (2000)	Peak position
European Albums (Eurotipsheet)	44
Scottish Albums (Official Charts)	9
UK Albums (Official Charts)	9
