= I Believe (Stephen Gately song) =

2000 single by Stephen Gately

Single by Stephen Gately

from the album New Beginning and Billy Elliot (soundtrack)
- Released: 14 October 2000
- Genre: Pop
- Label: Polydor
- Songwriter(s): Steve Mac, Wayne Hector
- Producer(s): Steve Mac

Stephen Gately singles chronology
"New Beginning/Bright Eyes" (2000)	"I Believe" (2000)	"Stay" (2001)

"I Believe" is a song by Irish singer-songwriter Stephen Gately from his debut solo album, New Beginning. It was released on 14 October 2000 in the United Kingdom. The song debuted at number 11 in the UK. The song was used for the soundtrack of the film Billy Elliot.

== Track listing ==
- UK CD single
1. "I Believe"
2. "Waiting for This Feeling"
3. "Where Did You Go" (Live with Boyzone at Wembley)
- UK cassette single
1. "I Believe"
2. "I Believe" (Love to Infinity Remix)
3. "I Believe" (Jewels & Stone Remix)
4. "I Believe" (Almighty Remix)

== Charts ==
Chart (2000)	Peak position
Europe (Eurochart Hot 100)	47
Scotland (OCC)	8
UK Singles (OCC)	11
