= Billy Elliot =

2000 film directed by Stephen Daldry

- Theatrical release poster
- Directed by: Stephen Daldry
- Written by: Lee Hall
- Produced by: Greg Brenman; Jon Finn
- Starring: Julie Walters; Gary Lewis; Jamie Bell; Jamie Draven; Adam Cooper
- Cinematography: Brian Tufano
- Edited by: John Wilson
- Music by: Stephen Warbeck
- Production companies: StudioCanal; Working Title Films; BBC Films; WT² Productions; Tiger Aspect Pictures
- Distributed by: Universal Pictures (through United International Pictures)
- Release date: 29 September 2000
- Running time: 110 minutes
- Country: United Kingdom
- Language: English
- Budget: $5 million
- Box office: $109.3 million

Billy Elliot is a 2000 British coming-of-age film directed by Stephen Daldry and written by Lee Hall. Set in County Durham in North East England during the 1984–1985 miners' strike, the film is about a working-class boy who has a passion for ballet. His father objects, based on negative stereotypes of male ballet dancers. The film stars Jamie Bell as 11-year-old Billy, Gary Lewis as his father, Jamie Draven as Billy's older brother, and Julie Walters as his ballet teacher.

Adapted from a play called Dancer by Lee Hall, development on the film began in 1999. Around 2,000 boys were considered for the role of Billy before Bell was chosen. Filming began in the North East of England in August 1999. Greg Brenman and Jon Finn served as producers, while Stephen Warbeck composed the film's score. Billy Elliot is a co-production among BBC Films, Tiger Aspect Pictures and Working Title Films.

The film premiered at the 2000 Cannes Film Festival, and began a wider theatrical release in the United Kingdom on 29 September 2000 by Universal Pictures through United International Pictures. Billy Elliot received positive critical response and commercial success, earning $109.3 million worldwide on a $5 million budget. At the 54th British Academy Film Awards, the film won three of thirteen award nominations. Jamie Bell became the youngest winner of Best Actor in a Leading Role. The film also earned three nominations at the 73rd Academy Awards for Best Director, Best Original Screenplay and Best Actress in a Supporting Role.

In 2001, the film was adapted as a novel by Melvin Burgess. The story was also adapted for the West End stage as Billy Elliot the Musical, first produced in 2005. It opened in Australia in 2007 and on Broadway in New York City in 2008.

== Plot ==
In 1984, Billy Elliot is an 11-year-old from the fictional Everington in County Durham, England. He lives with his widowed father, Jackie, and older brother, Tony, both coal miners out on strike (the latter being the union delegate), and his maternal grandmother who has Alzheimer's disease.

Billy's father sends him to the gym to learn boxing, but Billy dislikes the sport. He happens to see a ballet class that is using the gym while their usual basement studio is being used temporarily as a soup kitchen for the striking miners. Unbeknownst to Jackie, Billy joins the ballet class out of curiosity. When Jackie discovers this, he forbids Billy to take any more classes. But, passionate about dancing, the boy secretly continues his lessons with the help of his dance teacher, Sandra Wilkinson.

Sandra believes that Billy is talented enough to study at the Royal Ballet School in London, but due to Tony's arrest during a clash between police and striking miners, Billy misses the audition. Sandra tells Jackie about the missed opportunity but, fearing that Billy will be considered to be gay, both Jackie and Tony are outraged at the prospect of him becoming a professional ballet dancer.

The following month, Billy learns his best friend, Michael, is gay, which Billy is supportive of. Later, Jackie catches Billy and Michael dancing in the gym, and realises his son is truly passionate. Although stunned at first, he resolves to do whatever it takes to help Billy attain his dream. Sandra tries to persuade Jackie to let her pay for the audition, but he replies that Billy is his son and he does not need charity. Jackie attempts to cross the picket line to pay for the trip to London, but Tony stops him. Instead, his fellow miners and the neighbourhood raise some money, and Jackie pawns Billy's mother's jewellery to cover the cost, and Jackie takes him to London to audition.

Although very nervous, Billy performs well. He punches another boy in frustration at the audition, and fears that he has ruined his chances. He is rebuked by the review board and, when asked what it feels like when he is dancing, struggles for words. He says that it is "like electricity". Seemingly rejected, Billy returns home with his father.

In 1985, the Royal Ballet School sends him a letter of acceptance, coinciding with the end of the miners' strike, and Billy leaves home to study in London.

In 1998, 25-year-old Billy performs as the Swan in Matthew Bourne's Swan Lake with Jackie, Tony, and Michael watching from the audience. As Billy takes the stage, his father is overcome with astonishment and pride in his son.

== Cast ==
- Jamie Bell as Billy Elliot
  - Adam Cooper as Billy aged 25
- Julie Walters as Sandra Wilkinson
- Gary Lewis as Jackie Elliot
- Jamie Draven as Tony Elliot
- Jean Heywood as Grandma
- Stuart Wells as Michael Caffrey
  - Merryn Owen as Michael aged 25
- Nicola Blackwell as Debbie Wilkinson
- Colin Maclachlan as Tom Wilkinson
- Mike Elliott as George Watson
- Billy Fane as Mr Braithwaite
- Janine Birkett as Jenny Elliot
- Charlie Hardwick as Sheila Briggs
- Matthew James Thomas as Simon
- Stephen Mangan as Dr Crane
- Patrick Malahide as Royal Ballet School principal

== Production ==
=== Development ===
Lee Hall developed Billy Elliot from his play Dancer, which premiered as a rehearsed reading in 1998 at the Live Theatre in Newcastle upon Tyne. He was heavily influenced by photographer Sirkka-Liisa Konttinen's book Step by Step, about a dancing school in nearby North Shields. Writing in 2009, Hall said that "almost every frame of Billy Elliot was influenced by Step by Step [...] as every member of the design team carried around their own copy."

Hall met with director Stephen Daldry, who was working at the Royal Court Theatre at the time. At first, Daldry was not convinced with the script, but said, "I liked the emotional honesty of Billy Elliot. Also Lee writes brilliant kids. And there's a series of themes in it I rather enjoyed: Grief; finding means of self-identification through some sort of creative act, in this case dance; and the miner's strike itself." Working Title Films approached Daldry to become director and he accepted the offer. The BBC financed the project.

=== Casting ===
Thousands of boys were considered for the lead role. The producers were looking for a boy in a specific geographical area with a dance background. Jamie Bell had about seven auditions in total before eventually in mid-1999, it was announced that he would play the lead role in the film. Peter Darling, the film's choreographer, worked with Bell for "eight hours a day for three months, finding out what drove him as a dancer." Julie Walters accepted the role of Sandra Wilkinson. Walters called the script "moving", explaining, "It was a diamond in the sand [...] I loved the character, and the fact that she was disappointed on every level possible. She was so grim and jaded. Her relationship with the boy was so unusual".

In preparation for filming, Gary Lewis met with miners which he said was beneficial. Lewis stated that his own personal experience of the miners' strike made the role enjoyable. "My family and I were very active in supporting the miners: I stood in picket lines, I raised money for the miners and I was involved in the whole campaign to stop [...] closing the pits. Basically, it was the state that launched a complete attack on a section of the work force, a section of the working class. Lots of people responded with solidarity and that was a key element in the script: solidarity working at different levels, the collective solidarity, the economic solidarity."

=== Filming ===
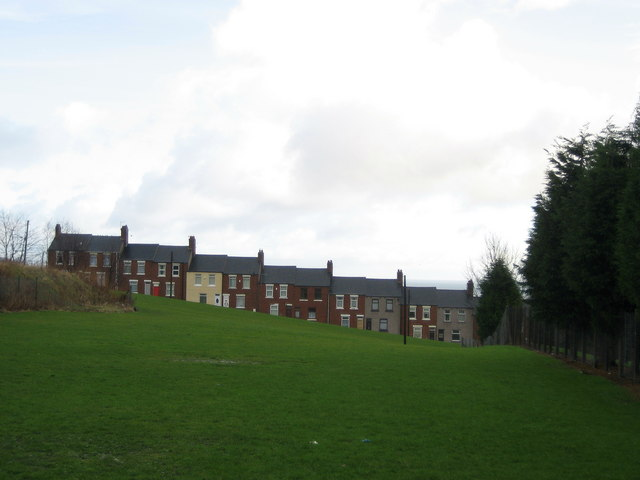
Terraced homes on Avon Street, Easington Colliery, were used for filming, where Andrew and Alnwick Streets once stood.

Principal photography lasted seven weeks, beginning in August 1999. Most of the film, including the interior of the Elliot home at 5 Alnwick Street, was shot on location in the Easington Colliery area, with the producers using over 400 locals as extras. The mining scenes were filmed at the Ellington and Lynemouth Colliery in Northumberland, with some filming in Dawdon, Middlesbrough and Newcastle upon Tyne. Andrew Street and Alnwick Street, where the characters live, were two of several streets demolished in 2003 after becoming derelict. The cemetery scene was filmed at Lynemouth Cemetery. School scenes were filmed in Langley Park Primary School. Other filming locations include the Green Drive Railway Viaduct in Seaham, Tees Transporter Bridge, New Wardour Castle and Theatre Royal in Haymarket.

Daldry remarked in an interview: "The shooting schedule was a nightmare; we only had seven weeks. Kids can only work nine to five and you can't work Saturdays. And the kid had to dance the whole time. So it was tight." Producer Jon Finn spoke of the difficulties of seeking filming locations: "We didn't realise how hard it would be to find working pits."

== Music ==
Billy Elliot

Soundtrack album by Various artists
- Released: 2000
- Recorded: 2000
- Genres: Punk rock, Glam rock, Pop, New wave
- Length: 51:34
- Label: Polydor Records
- Producer: Various artists

Singles from Billy Elliot: Original Motion Picture Soundtrack
- 1. "I Believe" Released: 14 October 2000

Stephen Warbeck scored the incidental music for the film. Polydor Records released the soundtrack on 11 March 2002, which includes several well-known glam rock and punk songs from T. Rex and The Clash. The soundtrack also contains pieces of dialogue from the film.

Original Motion Picture Soundtrack
No.	Title	Music	Length
1.	"Cosmic Dancer"	T. Rex	4:28
2.	"Boys Play Football"	Jamie Bell & Gary Lewis	0:52
3.	"Bang a Gong (Get It On)"	T. Rex	4:24
4.	"Mother's Letter"	Jamie Bell & Julie Walters	0:40
5.	"I Believe"	Stephen Gately	3:27
6.	"Town Called Malice"	The Jam	2:53
7.	"The Sun Will Come Out"	Jamie Bell, Nicole Blackwell & Julie Walters	0:50
8.	"I Love to Boogie"	T. Rex	2:11
9.	"Burning Up"	Eagle-Eye Cherry	4:14
10.	"Royal Ballet School"	Jamie Bell & Julie Walters	1:11
11.	"London Calling"	The Clash	3:20
12.	"Children of the Revolution"	T. Rex	4:44
13.	"Audition Panel"	Jamie Bell & Barbara Leigh Hunt	0:33
14.	"Shout to the Top!"	The Style Council	4:14
15.	"Walls Come Tumbling Down!"	The Style Council	3:21
16.	"Ride a White Swan"	T. Rex	2:14
17.	"Cosmic Dancer (Reprise)"	T. Rex	4:27
Total length:			51:34

== Reception and legacy ==
=== Box office ===
Billy Elliot premiered on 19 May at the 2000 Cannes Film Festival under the title Dancer. It was later decided to re-title the film Billy Elliot to avoid confusion with Dancer in the Dark, another film at Cannes that year. Billy Elliot was theatrically released on 29 September 2000 in the United Kingdom by Universal Pictures through United International Pictures. In the United States, Universal Focus released the film on 13 October 2000. Against expectations, the film grossed $109,280,263 worldwide, including $24 million in the United Kingdom and $22 million in the United States and Canada. Universal Home Entertainment released Billy Elliot on VHS on 20 April 2001, and on Blu-ray on 10 January 2012. The Blu-ray includes a short documentary of the film's production.

=== Critical response ===
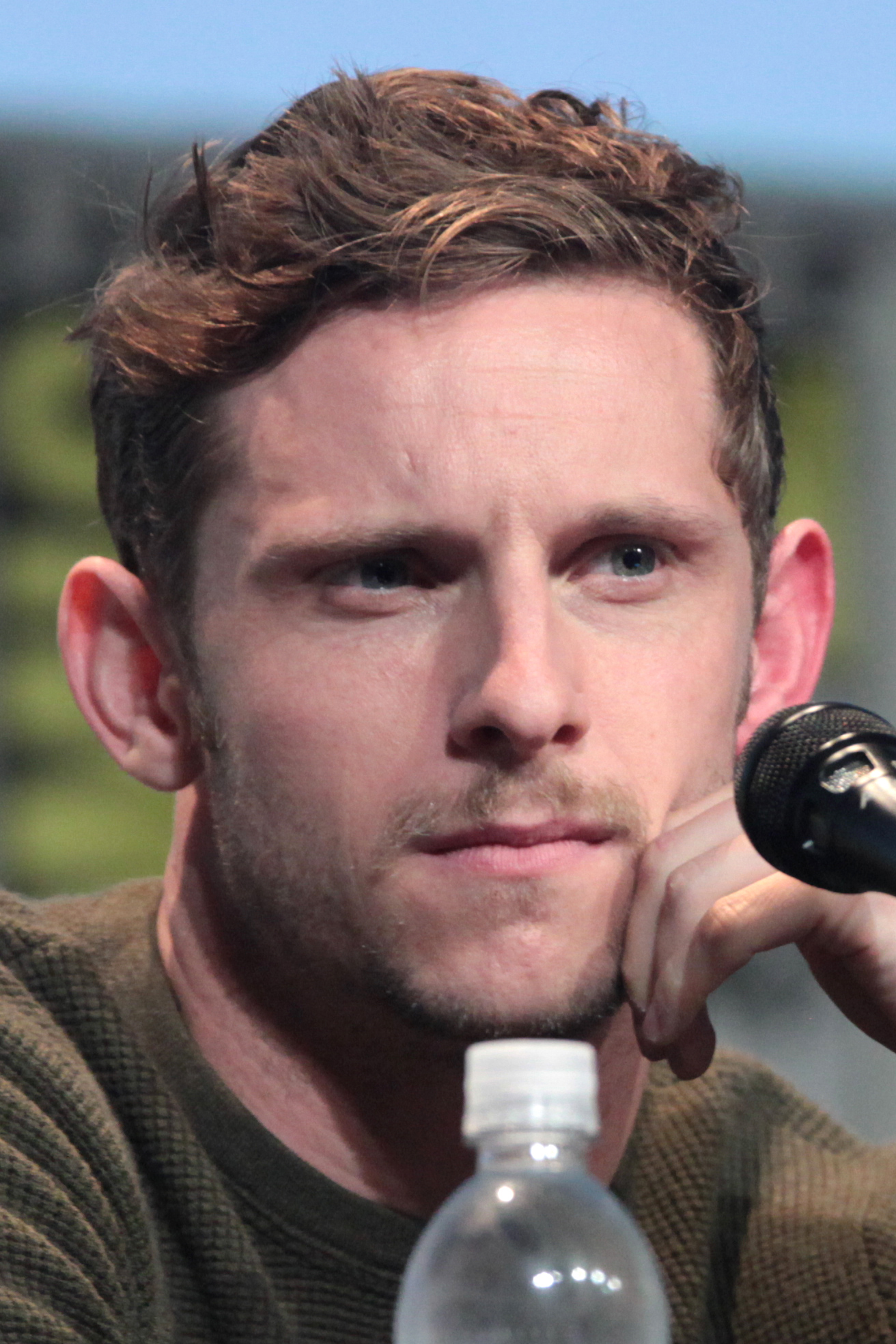
Jamie Bell (pictured in 2015) won the BAFTA Award for Best Lead Actor, becoming the youngest winner in the category.

On review aggregator website Rotten Tomatoes, the film holds an approval rating of 87% based on 113 critic reviews, with an average rating of 7.60/10. The site's critical consensus reads: "Billy Elliot is a charming movie that can evoke both laughter and tears." At Metacritic, the film has a weighted average score of 74 out of 100, based on 34 critics, indicating "generally favourable reviews". Audiences polled by CinemaScore gave the film an average grade of "A−" on an A+ to F scale.

Film critic Roger Ebert gave the film three out of four stars, calling the film "as much parable and fantasy as it is realistic". He said Bell's performance was "engaging", Lewis was "convincing" and Walters was "spirited and colourful". Peter Bradshaw of The Guardian praised the film saying, "This is a film with a lot of charm, a lot of humour and a lot of heart. Daldry's direction and the screenplay by Lee Hall distinguish themselves further in the discreet, intelligent way ... Billy Elliot has a freshness that makes it a pleasure to watch; it's a very emphatic success". David Rooney of Variety also praised the cast, writing, "Relationships between all the characters are well observed—the father and his sons, the two brothers, and Billy and his grandmother, his friend Michael and jaded Mrs. Wilkinson—all of them yielding sweet, unforced feel-good moments". Rooney also praised the cinematography, visuals and soundtrack in showing Billy's rebelliousness. Charlotte O'Sullivan of The Independent wrote the cast are "near perfect", adding the film is "as raw a slice of escapism as you could wish for". William Gallagher from the BBC gave the film five out of five stars, writing, "It's a simple tale but one that is extremely well told and acted. Fittingly for a story about dance, it doesn't put a foot wrong and is engrossing, funny, very sad, very moving and very uplifting."

Some critics gave a mixed response. Timeout magazine believes that "Daldry overuses the dance as a metaphor for escape and frustration, and choreographer Peter Darling's grandstanding ballet numbers sit a little uneasily, given the realist comedy pitch". A. O. Scott of The New York Times notes that there were "patches of thinness and predictability", and that "the first half seems to acknowledge its own triteness". However, he compliments the pacing of the scenes and the actors who "inhabit their roles like second-hand suits". Mark Holcomb, writing for IndieWire, took issue with the "odd, unsuccessful mix of theatrical whimsy and social realism", and a dance scene which he describes as a "cringe-inducing '80s-style music video routine".

=== Themes ===
Poverty and social class have been seen as major themes of the film. Author Rebecca Mahon observed the film has a realistic setting; the early scenes emphasising the miners' strike, the death of Billy's mother and the family's financial situation. Daldry adds, "It doesn't matter where you are in the world, people understand the idea that you're part of an industrial, working class group that is being discarded. And its question—of what happens to communities devastated by de-industrialisation and privatisation". In addition to social class, Daldry states that the film is about finding a voice—"someone trying to express himself or herself". Koller-Alonso writes that gender differences are expressed by showing girls attending ballet classes, while their male counterparts are having boxing lessons. Homosexuality, a taboo subject in the 1980s, as well as police brutality are depicted and explored in the film.

=== Accolades ===
Award	Category	Recipients)	Result	Ref
Academy Awards	Best Director	Stephen Daldry	Nominated	
Academy Awards	Best Actress in a Supporting Role	Julie Walters	Nominated	
Academy Awards	Best Original Screenplay	Lee Hall	Nominated	
American Cinema Editors	Best Edited Dramatic Feature Film	Billy Elliot	Nominated	
Art Directors Guild	Feature Film	Billy Elliot	Nominated	
Australian Film Institute	Best Foreign Film	Billy Elliot	Nominated	
British Academy of Film and Television Arts	Best Film	Billy Elliot	Nominated	
British Academy of Film and Television Arts	Best Actor in a Leading Role	Jamie Bell	Won	
British Academy of Film and Television Arts	Best Direction	Stephen Daldry	Nominated	
British Academy of Film and Television Arts	Carl Foreman Award for Most Promising Newcomer in British Film	Stephen Daldry	Nominated	
British Academy of Film and Television Arts	Carl Foreman Award for Most Promising Newcomer in British Film	Lee Hall	Nominated	
British Academy of Film and Television Arts	Best Original Screenplay	Lee Hall	Nominated	
British Academy of Film and Television Arts	Outstanding British Film	Billy Elliot	Won	
British Academy of Film and Television Arts	Best Actor in a Supporting Role	Gary Lewis	Nominated	
British Academy of Film and Television Arts	Best Actress in a Supporting Role	Julie Walters	Won	
British Academy of Film and Television Arts	Anthony Asquith Award for Film Music	Stephen Warbeck	Nominated	
British Academy of Film and Television Arts	Best Cinematography	Brian Tufano	Nominated	
British Academy of Film and Television Arts	Best Editing	John Wilson	Nominated	
British Academy of Film and Television Arts	Best Sound	Mark Holding, Mike Prestwood Smith, and Zane Hayward	Nominated	
British Independent Film Awards	Best British Independent Film	Billy Elliot	Won	
British Independent Film Awards	Best Newcomer	Jamie Bell	Won	
British Independent Film Awards	Best Director	Stephen Daldry	Won	
British Independent Film Awards	Best Screenplay	Lee Hall	Won	
Golden Globe Awards	Best Motion Picture – Drama	Billy Elliot	Nominated	
Golden Globe Awards	Best Supporting Actress – Motion Picture	Julie Walters	Nominated	
Screen Actors Guild Awards	Outstanding Performance by a Male Actor in a Leading Role	Jamie Bell	Nominated	
Screen Actors Guild Awards	Outstanding Performance by a Female Actor in a Supporting Role	Julie Walters	Nominated	
Screen Actors Guild Awards	Outstanding Performance by a Cast in a Motion Picture	Billy Elliot	Nominated	
London Film Critics' Circle	British Newcomer of the Year	Jamie Bell	Won	
London Film Critics' Circle	British Producer of the Year	Greg Brenman	Won	
London Film Critics' Circle	British Producer of the Year	Jon Finn	Won	
London Film Critics' Circle	British Director of the Year	Stephen Daldry	Won	
London Film Critics' Circle	British Film of the Year	Billy Elliot	Won	
London Film Critics' Circle	British Actress of the Year	Julie Walters	Won	
Motovun Film Festival	Propeller Award	Billy Elliot	Won	

=== Stage musical ===
After the film's release, English singer-songwriter Elton John collaborated with the film's screenwriter Lee Hall to produce a musical adaptation of the film, which premiered 31 March 2005 at the Victoria Palace Theatre on the West End. Many of the film's crew took part in the stage production, including director Stephen Daldry and choreographer Peter Darling. The musical received positive reviews and ran for over 4,000 performances before closing in April 2016.

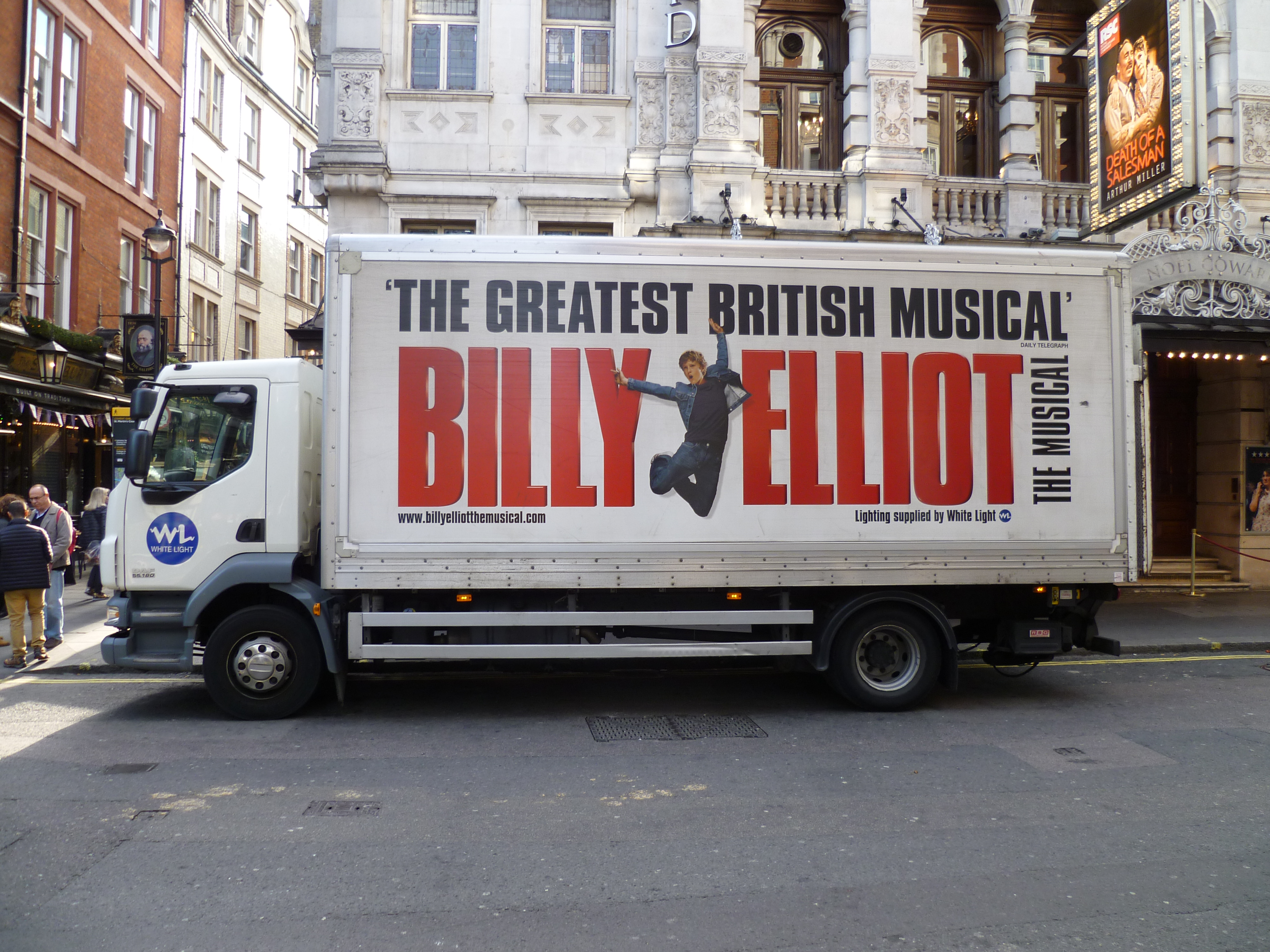
Advertisement for the Billy Elliot musical on a lorry in London

The musical ran on Broadway from November 2008 to January 2012, and won ten Tony Awards in 2009, including Best Musical.

== See also ==
- Independent cinema in the United Kingdom
- Kes
- Brassed Off
- The Stars Look Down
- Yeh Ballet
- Hula Girls
- The Full Monty
- Pride
- Homer vs. Patty and Selma
