= Jules Williams =

British writer, director, and producer

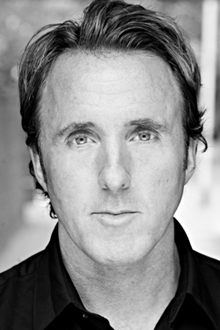
- Born: Abergavenny, Wales, United Kingdom
- Education: Bath Spa University
- Occupations: Television producer, television director, television writer
- Website: www.juleswilliams.com

Julian Lloyd "Jules" Williams is a British writer, director, and producer. He has collaborated with best selling authors, he wrote both the Living The Life accompanying book and The Weigh Forward, and is the Director and Producer of Sky Arts 1 & Back Door Productions Living The Life. In February 2009, Williams was invited to test the credibility of his profession when BBC's Newsnight ran a feature on the practice of remote viewing.

== Television ==
Williams' career in television began when he moved to London to work on Psychic Today for Sky Television as a psychic and presenter. His interest in production led him to direct and produce his own television show Living the Life with Back Door Productions for Sky Arts. Jules worked alongside contributors including Stephen Fry, Robin Gibb, Joanna Lumley, John Hurt, Hans Zimmer, Elaine Paige and many others.

Williams is set to work alongside Nick Pope former head of the British Government's UFO program in Back Door Production's Contact Alien Hybrid.

== Living The life ==
William's is the director and co-producer of the Sky Arts series Living The Life, now in its third season.

=== Season One ===
- Stephen Fry and Bill Wyman
- Melvyn Bragg and Joanna Lumley
- Leslie Phillips and Robin Gibb
- Dylan Jones and George Lamb
- Fay Weldon and Caitlin Moran
- Brigitte Nielsen and Britt Ekland
- Ian Botham and Sir Tim Rice
- Lord Sebastian Coe and Gary Newbon
- Sir Peter Blake and Ken Russell
- Charles Dance and Paul McGann
- Jeremy Clarkson and Nick Mason
- Cilla Black and Daniel O'Donnell
- Howard Marks and Peter Stringfellow

=== Season Two ===
- Nicholas Evans and James Nesbitt
- Anna Friel and Brenda Fricker
- Timothy West and Ken Livingstone
- Dame Monica Mason and Sir Derek Jacobi
- John Hurt and Sir Alan Parker
- Steven Berkoff and Martin Kemp
- Des O'Connor and Alan Davies
- Mary Quant and Alexandra Shulman
- Alan Yentob and Sir Salman Rushdie
- David Bailey and Tim Marlow

=== Season Three ===
- Dave Stewart and Elliott Gould
- Susan George and Robert Lindsay
- Gareth Edwards and Matthew Rhys
- Hans Zimmer and Derren Brown
- Marianne Faithfull and Ian La Frenais
- Jeffrey Archer and Sir Donald Sinden
- Lord Andrew Lloyd Webber and A. R. Rahman
- Elaine Paige and Twiggy

== Writer ==
Williams contributes to magazines and newspapers such as Macs Magazine, Cover Media, Soho House, The Guardian Cardiff, and The Irish World. Jules Williams is a regular contributor to Natural Health Magazine, and is included as one of the publications panel of leading experts on matters of the mind, body and soul.

Williams' book The Weigh Forward posits subconscious blocks as the real reason that people hold on to weight at an increasing pace. The book is available in hard copy.

Williams' most recent release is Living The Life, the accompanying book to the hit Sky Arts Television Series of the same name. It was released in conjunction with Tesco Entertainment and Back Door Productions & Management.

Williams' also contributed to the children's book The Tree of Seasons helping to finish it after the untimely death of Boyzone member and writer Stephen Gately.
