= New Beginning (Stephen Gately song) =

2000 single by Stephen Gately

Single by Stephen Gately

from the album New Beginning
- A-side: "Bright Eyes"
- Released: 29 May 2000
- Length: 3:38
- Label: A&M
- Songwriters: Anders Bagge; Arnthor Birgisson; Simon Climie; Stephen Gately
- Producers: Bag & Arnthor

Stephen Gately singles chronology
"New Beginning" / "Bright Eyes" (2000)	"I Believe" (2000)

Audio
- "New Beginning" on YouTube

Audio
- "Bright Eyes" on YouTube

"New Beginning" is a song by Irish singer-songwriter Stephen Gately from his debut solo album, New Beginning. His debut single outside Boyzone, it was released on 29 May 2000 in the United Kingdom—where it was issued as a double A-side with Gately's cover of Art Garfunkel's "Bright Eyes"—and peaked at number three on the UK Singles Chart. The music video for "New Beginning" was directed by Simon Hilton and shot in London. In the 2001 United Kingdom general election the Liberal Democrats used the song as their election theme song.

== Track listings ==
UK CD1

1. "New Beginning"
2. "Bright Eyes"
3. "New Beginning" (Love to Infinity mix)
4. "New Beginning" (CD ROM video)

UK CD2

1. "New Beginning"
2. "Bright Eyes" (Jewels & Stone remix)
3. "New Beginning" (Joey Musaphia's Genesis mix)
4. "New Beginning" (CD ROM video)

UK cassette single

A. "New Beginning"
AA. "Bright Eyes"

European CD single

1. "New Beginning" (radio edit) – 3:38
2. "New Beginning" (Love to Infinity mix) – 3:30

European and Australian maxi-CD single

1. "New Beginning" (radio edit) – 3:38
2. "Bright Eyes" (Love to Infinity mix) – 6:45
3. "New Beginning" (Joey Musaphia's Genesis mix) – 8:05

== Personnel ==
Personnel are lifted from the UK CD1 liner notes.

- Stephen Gately – writing, vocals
- Anders Bagge – writing
- Arnthor Birgisson – writing, background vocals
- Simon Climie – writing
- Anders Von Hoffsten – background vocals
- Esbjörn Öhrwall – guitar
- Patrick Tucker – guitar
- Stockholm Session Strings – strings
- Bag & Arnthor – production
- Jansson & Jansson – string arrangement
- Bob Kraushaar – mixing
- Patrick – mixing assistance
- Aaron Chakraverty – mastering
- Stylorouge – artwork design
- Tim Bret-Day – photography

== Charts ==
=== Weekly charts ===
Chart (2000)	Peak position
Australia (ARIA)	92
Belgium (Ultratip Bubbling Under Flanders)	9
Europe (Eurochart Hot 100)	16
Ireland (IRMA)	8
Italy Airplay (Music & Media)	9
Latvia (Latvijas Top 30)	23
Netherlands (Dutch Top 40 Tipparade)	4
Netherlands (Single Top 100)	65
New Zealand (Recorded Music NZ)	41
Scottish Singles Sales (Official Charts)	4
UK Singles (Official Charts)	3
UK Airplay (Music Week)	21

=== Year-end charts ===
Chart (2000)	Position
UK Singles (OCC)	109
