= Living the Life =

- Genre: Talk
- Created by: Rosemary Reed
- Directed by: Jules Williams
- Presented by: Charles Dance (voice only)
- Country of origin: United Kingdom
- No. of seasons: 3
- No. of episodes: 27

Production
- Executive producer: Rosemary Reed
- Production location: Pinewood Studios
- Running time: 60 min
- Production company: Back Door Productions

Original release
- Network: Sky Arts
- Release: 6 November 2011 – 20 November 2013

Living the Life is a British television talk show that features unmoderated conversations between two celebrities. It represents a divergence from the standard interviewer-subject talk show format. Living the Life airs on UK's Sky Arts network.

== Format ==
The hour-long talk show provides a unique take on the genre by allowing the two guest celebrities to converse freely without an interviewer. In these conversations, the celebrities discuss how emotional experiences from their childhood, their early career, the onset of success and their subsequent journey through wealth and fame has shaped their lives. They also discuss their achievements and the effects of living life in the public eye.

The main hook of Living The Life is that, unlike the traditional interview formula, the participants, bonded by mutual accomplishment, chat to each other from a place of mutual respect and admiration and they relax into an intimate and unreserved exchange.

== Production ==
=== Season 1 ===
Living the Life is a production of Back Door Productions. Executive Producer Rosemary Reed and Director Jules Williams produce the show out of their Pinewood Studios location. The first season premiered on 6 November 2011, and ran for 10 consecutive weeks.

Season 1 of Living the Life was released on DVD exclusively through Tesco Entertainment. The DVD set included four bonus episodes and an accompanying behind-the-scenes book, Living the Life written by director Jules Williams.

Living the Life has also been made available via UK based video on demand website Blinkbox, where episodes (including the four DVD-only episodes) can be downloaded individually. DVD box set.

=== Season 2 ===
Living the Life returned for a second season that debuted in October 2012 on Sky Arts.

== Episodes ==
As of May 2013, Living the Life has produced 23 episodes, including four episodes available only online or on DVD.

=== Series 1 ===
No.	Guests	Original release date
1	Stephen Fry & Bill Wyman	6 November 2011
2	Joanna Lumley & Lord Melvyn Bragg	13 November 2011
3	Leslie Phillips & Robin Gibb	20 November 2011
4	Dylan Jones & George Lamb	27 November 2011
5	Caitlin Moran & Fay Weldon	4 December 2011
6	Brigitte Nielsen & Britt Ekland	11 December 2011
7	Sir Tim Rice & Sir Ian Botham	18 December 2011
8	Lord Sebastian Coe & Gary Newbon	8 January 2012
9	Sir Peter Blake & Ken Russell	15 January 2012
10	Paul McGann & Charles Dance	22 January 2012

=== Series 1 – Exclusive DVD Episodes ===
No.	Guests
1	Jeremy Clarkson & Nick Mason
2	Cilla Black & Daniel O'Donnell
3	Des O'Connor & Alan Davies
4	Howard Marks & Peter Stringfellow

=== Series 2 ===
No.	Guests	Original release date
1	Nicholas Evans & James Nesbitt	30 October 2012
2	Anna Friel & Brenda Fricker	6 November 2012
3	Timothy West CBE & Ken Livingstone	13 November 2012
4	Dame Monica Mason DBE & Sir Derek Jacobi	20 November 2012
5	John Hurt & Sir Alan Parker	27 November 2012
6	Steven Berkoff & Martin Kemp	4 December 2012
7	Des O'Connor CBE & Alan Davies	11 December 2012
8	Mary Quant OBE & Alexandra Shulman OBE	18 December 2012
9	David Bailey & Tim Marlow	8 January 2013

=== Series 3 ===
No.	Guests	Original release date
1	Dave Stewart and Elliott Gould	2 October 2013
2	Susan George and Robert Lindsay	9 October 2013
3	Gareth Edwards and Matthew Rhys	16 October 2013
4	Hans Zimmer and Derren Brown	23 October 2013
5	Marianne Faithfull and Ian La Frenais	30 October 2013
6	Jeffrey Archer and Sir Donald Sinden	6 November 2013
7	Lord Andrew Lloyd Webber and A. R. Rahman	15 November 2013
8	Elaine Paige and Twiggy	20 November 2013
