= Miccoli (band) =

British pop band

- Origin: Birmingham, England, UK
- Genres: Adult alternative, indie pop, indie rock
- Years active: 2012–present
- Label: AFA Records
- Members: Adriano Miccoli; Alessio Miccoli; Francesca Miccoli
- Website: miccoli.co.uk

Miccoli is a British, adult alternative/indie pop band from Birmingham, England. The group consists of siblings: twin brothers Adriano Miccoli (vocal and acoustic/electric guitar) Alessio Miccoli (piano, vocal and acoustic guitar) and sister Francesca Miccoli (vocal, piano and harmonica).

The band have had videos featured on VH1 and Bliss TV in the UK. With tracks also receiving air play on BBC Radio 2 and BBC Radio 6's Introducing.

== Discography ==
- Arrhythmia (2019)
