= Stay (Stephen Gately song) =

Single by Stephen Gately

from the album New Beginning
- Released: 12 May 2001
- Genre: Pop
- Label: Polydor
- Songwriter(s): Hallgeir Rustan, Mikkel S. Eriksen
- Producer(s): Stargate

Stephen Gately singles chronology
"I Believe" (2000)	"Stay" (2001)	"Children of Tomorrow" (2007)

"Stay" is a song by Irish singer-songwriter and Boyzone member Stephen Gately from his debut solo album, New Beginning. It was released as the third single from the album on 12 May 2001. The song peaked at number 13 on the UK Singles Chart.

== Track listing ==
- UK CD single #1
1. "Stay" - 3:47
2. "I Can Dream" - 3:38
3. "Stay" (Almighty Remix) - 7:19
- UK CD single #2
1. "Stay" - 3:47
2. "Games of Love" (Performance with Boyzone)

== Charts ==
Chart (2000)	Peak position
Europe (Eurochart Hot 100)	46
Scotland (OCC)	9
UK Singles (OCC)	13
