= Dream (Boyzone song) =

Single by Boyzone featuring Stephen Gately

from the album Thank You & Goodnight
- Released: 15 June 2018
- Genre: Pop
- Length: 3:21
- Label: Warner Music
- Songwriters: Keith Duffy; Mikey Graham; Ronan Keating; Shane Lynch; Stephen Gately; Tim Hawes; Pete Kirtley
- Producers: Toby Scott; Pete Kirtley

Boyzone singles chronology
"Light Up the Night" (2014)	"Dream" (2018)	"Because" (2018)

"Dream" (also known as "I Can Dream") is song a by Irish boy band Boyzone.

== Background ==
On 1 May 2018, the band announced that they will release the sixth and final album to celebrate the band's 25 years journey in music. Following the announcement of the album, they also announce the release of the song from the album, titled: "I Can Dream", which was released on 15 June 2018. The song also contains Stephen Gately's vocals. Gately previously recorded a solo version of the song as the b-side to the single "Stay" (2001). When the song's original producer, Pete Kirtley, found the old DAT-recording containing "I Can Dream", he sent it to Boyzone's label. The band decided to re-record the song adding their vocals to Gately's version, thus including their late co-member of Boyzone in their last ever studio album. Boyzone re-wrote some of the lyrics and Keith Duffy said they turned it into "a song reminiscing about us back in the 1990s".

== Promotion ==
A lyric video for the song was also released on the band's YouTube official account on 15 June 2018. Images of the band when they were young which contains Stephen Gately's images was also used in the video.

== Track listing ==
- Digital download
1. "Dream" – 3:21

== Release history ==
Country	Date	Format	Label
United Kingdom	15 June 2018	Digital download	Warner Music Group
Ireland	15 June 2018	Digital download	Warner Music Group
