= Because (Demis Roussos song) =

Single by Demis Roussos

from the album The Demis Roussos Magic and Ainsi soit-il
- Released: 1977
- Label: Philips
- Songwriters: Vangelis Papathanassiou, Alec R. Costandinos
- Producer: Vangelis

Demis Roussos singles chronology
"When Forever Has Gone" (1976)	"Because" (1977)	"Kyrila" (1977)

Music video
- "Because" (Official Video) on YouTube

"Because" is a song by Greek singer Demis Roussos. It was released as a single in 1977.

The song was part of the 1977 Demis Roussos album The Demis Roussos Magic.

== Background and writing ==
The song "Because" was written by Vangelis Papathanassiou and Alec R. Costandinos. The recording was arranged and produced by Vangelis.

There were also a French version and a Spanish version of this song. The French version, titled "Mourir auprès de mon amour", was also released as a single in 1977. It was included on Roussos' 1977 French-language album Ainsi soit-il. The Spanish version, titled "Morir al lado de mi amor", was as well released as a single in 1977.

== Commercial performance ==
The single "Because" reached no. 39 in the UK.

The French version of the song, "Mourir auprès de mon amour", reached no. 26 in Flanders (Belgium) and no. 2 in Wallonia (Belgium).

== Track listings ==
=== "Because" ===
7" single Philips 6042 245 (1977, Germany, Netherlands, etc.)

A. "Because" (4:10)
B. "Maybe Someday" (3:17)

=== "Mourir auprès de mon amour (Because) / I Dig You" ===
7" single Philips 6042 262 (1977, France, Canada)

A. "Mourir auprès de mon amour" (4:18)
B. "I Dig You" (4:06)

=== "Morir al lado de mi amor (Because) / I Dig You" ===
7" single Philips 6042 289 (1977, Spain)

A. "Mourir auprès de mon amour" (4:18)
B. "I Dig You" (4:06)

=== "Morir al lado de mi amor" ===
7" single Philips 11166 (Panama)

A. "Morir al lado de mi amor"
B. "Day-O (Banana Boat Song)"
Fabricado por sono Mindi, S. A. (Panamá, R. de P.) bajo licencia de Philips.

== Charts ==
=== "Because" ===
Chart (1977)	Peak position
UK Singles (OCC)	39

=== "Mourir auprès de mon amour" ===
Chart (1977)	Peak position
Belgium (Ultratop 50 Flanders)	26
Belgium (Ultratop 50 Wallonia)	2
Chart (2015)	Peak position
France (SNEP)	135*

- Charted posthumously in 2015
