= Because (Boyzone song) =

Single by Boyzone

from the album Thank You & Goodnight
- Released: 26 July 2018
- Label: Warner Music Group; Warner Music
- Songwriter(s): John Shanks; Ronan Keating; Ed Sheeran; Amy Wadge
- Producer(s): John Shanks

Boyzone singles chronology
"Dream" (2018)	"Because" (2018)	"Love" (2018)

Music video
- "Because" on YouTube

"Because" is a song by Irish band Boyzone, released in July 2018 as the lead single from their final studio album Thank You & Goodnight, the band announced the news on their Twitter and Facebook official accounts. The song was released on 26 July 2018. The song is written by John Shanks, Boyzone-member Ronan Keating, Ed Sheeran, and Amy Wadge. Keating reached out to Sheeran who sent the track to Boyzone.

== Music video ==
The music video for the song was released on 26 July 2018, featuring the band, karaoke singing the lyric of the song on TV, in the TV, many people sang the lyrics, British musician Ed Sheeran also made a cameo appearance in the video.

== Track listing ==
- Digital download
1. "Because" - 2:46

== Release history ==
Country	Date	Format	Label
United Kingdom	15 June 2018	Digital download	Warner Music Group
Republic of Ireland	15 June 2018	Digital download	Warner Music Group
