= June Considine =

Irish novelist and children's writer

- Born: June Bolger
- Other name: Laura Elliot
- Occupations: Novelist and children's writer

June Considine is an Irish children's author and novelist. She also uses the pen name Laura Elliot.

== Biography ==
Born June Bolger, Considine grew up in Finglas, Dublin, Ireland. She has written for adults and children. She writes under her own name and using the pen name Laura Elliot. She has written solo novels, series and short stories. She has been published in anthologies and her work has appeared on the radio. She also worked as an editor and journalist as well as a ghost writer.

Her work was shortlisted for the Hennessy Literary Award and for the Bisto awards. Considine lives in Malahide, County Dublin.

== Bibliography ==
=== Zentyre ===
- When the Luvenders Came to Merrick Town (1990)
- Luvenders At the Old Mill (1990)
- Island of Luvenders (1991)

=== Beachwood ===
- Algarve Blues (1995)
- The Debs Ball (1993)
- The School Bully (1993)
- The Slumber Party (1993)
- Summer At Fountain Square (1993)
- Puppet Strings (1994)
- Twelve Days of Christmas and Thereafter

=== Novels ===
- View from a Blind Bridge (1992)
- The Glass Triangle (1994)
- When the Bough Breaks (2002), later renamed Fragile Lies.
- Deceptions (2004), later renamed Sleep Sister.

=== Novels as Laura Elliot ===
- The Prodigal Sister (2009)
- Stolen Child (2010)
- Fragile Lies (2015)
- The Betrayal (2015)
- Sleep Sister (2016)
- Guilty (2017)
- The Wife Before Me (2018)
- The Thorn Girl (2019)
- The Silent House (2020)
- After The Wedding (2022)
- The Marriage Retreat (2023)

She is published in Ireland and the UK by Bookouture, Sphere and Avon, and in the US by Grand Central Publishing. She is a founder member of WORD, a group of professional writers who meet quarterly to discuss issues of mutual interest, and also a founder member of Irish PEN/PEN na hÉireann , which was relaunched in November 2020.
