= Greatest Hits (Enrique Iglesias album) =

Compilation album by Enrique Iglesias
- Released: 11 November 2008
- Recorded: 1999–2008
- Length: 65:20
- Label: Interscope
- Producers: Enrique Iglesias; Mark Taylor; Brian Rawling; Sean "The Pen" Garrett; RedOne; Brian Kidd; Carlos Paucar; Scott Thomas; Steve Morales; Kara DioGuardi; David Foster; John Shanks; Big Ben Diehl

Enrique Iglesias chronology
Enrique Iglesias: 95/08 Exitos (2008)	Greatest Hits (2008)	Euphoria (2010)

Singles from Greatest Hits
- 1. "Can You Hear Me" Released: 27 June 2008; 2. "Away" Released: 11 November 2008; 3. "Takin' Back My Love" Released: 20 March 2009

Professional ratings
Review scores
Source	Rating
AllMusic	4/5 stars
Digital Spy	3/5 stars
BBC Online	(positive)

Greatest Hits is a compilation album by Spanish pop singer Enrique Iglesias. The album contains Enrique's greatest hits from his four English studio albums, as well as two newly recorded tracks – "Away", featuring Sean Garrett, and the hit single "Takin' Back My Love", featuring Ciara, which reached the top ten in numerous countries. The German version of the song features Sarah Connor, and the French version features Tyssem.

On 4 October 2019, the second Greatest Hits album by Enrique Iglesias was released under the same name. The new album featured Enrique's hits spanning Iglesias' music career spanning from Enrique Iglesias to Sex and Love.

== Track listing ==
No.	Title	Writer(s)	Producer(s)	Length
1.	"Bailamos"	Paul Barry; Mark Taylor	Taylor; Rawling	3:32
2.	"Away" (featuring Sean Garrett)	Sean Garrett; Fernando Garibay	The Pen	3:59
3.	"Hero"	Enrique Iglesias; Barry; Taylor	Taylor	4:24
4.	"Be with You"	Iglesias; Barry; Taylor	Taylor; Rawling	3:39
5.	"Takin' Back My Love" (featuring Ciara)	RedOne; Frankie Storm; Iglesias	RedOne	3:50
6.	"Rhythm Divine"	Barry; Taylor	Taylor; Rawling	3:29
7.	"Do You Know? (The Ping Pong Song)"	Garrett; Brian Kidd; Iglesias	The Pen; Kidd; Carlos Paucar^{[a]}; Iglesias^{[a]}	3:38
8.	"Tired of Being Sorry"	Scott Thomas; Iglesias	Thomas; Carlos Paucar^{[a]}; Iglesias^{[a]}	4:01
9.	"Escape"	Iglesias; Steve Morales; Kara DioGuardi; David Siegel	Morales; Iglesias^{[a]}^{[b]}; DioGuardi^{[a]}	3:27
10.	"Could I Have This Kiss Forever" (with Whitney Houston)	Diane Warren	David Foster	3:55
11.	"Not in Love (Radio edit)" (featuring Kelis)	Iglesias; Barry; Taylor; Garibay	Iglesias; Taylor	3:41
12.	"Don't Turn Off the Lights"	Iglesias; Morales; DioGuardi; Siegel	Morales; Iglesias^{[a]}^{[b]}; DioGuardi^{[a]}	3:46
13.	"Love to See You Cry"	Iglesias; Barry; Steve Torch; Taylor	Taylor; Iglesias^{[a]}^{[b]}; DioGuardi^{[a]}	4:05
14.	"Maybe"	Iglesias; Morales; DioGuardi; Siegel; Aaron Fishbein	Morales; Iglesias^{[a]}^{[b]}; DioGuardi^{[a]}	3:13
15.	"Addicted"	Iglesias; Barry; Taylor	Iglesias; Barry; Taylor	5:01
16.	"Somebody's Me"	Iglesias; John Shanks; DioGuardi	Shanks	3:58
17.	"Can You Hear Me"	Iglesias; Morales; Storm	Big Ben Diehl; Paucar	3:42
Total length:				65:20

Special Edition DVD
No.	Title	Length
1.	"Bailamos"	3:31
2.	"Rhythm Divine"	3:30
3.	"Hero"	4:23
4.	"Escape"	3:32
5.	"Love to See You Cry"	3:52
6.	"Addicted"	4:42
7.	"Do You Know? (The Ping Pong Song)"	5:07
8.	"Tired of Being Sorry"	4:35
9.	"Can You Hear Me"	3:45
10.	"Tired of Being Sorry (Live in Belfast)"	4:57
11.	"Be with You (Live in Belfast)"	3:41

- ^{^a} signifies a vocal producer
- ^{^b} signifies a co-producer

== Charts ==
=== Weekly charts ===
Chart (2008–2009)	Peak position
Australian Albums (ARIA)	65
Belgian Albums (Ultratop Flanders)	5
Belgian Albums (Ultratop Wallonia)	17
Danish Albums (Hitlisten)	15
Dutch Albums (Album Top 100)	4
European Albums (Billboard)	14
Finnish Albums (Suomen virallinen lista)	24
French Compilations	2
German Albums (Offizielle Top 100)	82
Greek Albums (IFPI)	18
Hungarian Albums (MAHASZ)	29
Irish Albums (IRMA)	9
Italian Albums (FIMI)	92
Norwegian Albums (VG-lista)	3
Portuguese Albums (AFP)	27
Russian Albums (2M)	15
Scottish Albums (Official Charts)	4
Swedish Albums (Sverigetopplistan)	2
Swiss Albums (Schweizer Hitparade)	24
UK Albums (Official Charts)	3
US Billboard 200	80

=== Year-end charts ===
Chart (2008)	Position
UK Albums (OCC)	31

Chart (2009)	Position
Belgian Albums (Ultratop Flanders)	19
Belgian Albums (Ultratop Wallonia)	39
Dutch Albums (Album Top 100)	19
UK Albums (OCC)	86

== Certifications and sales ==
Region	Certification	Certified units/sales
Belgium (BRMA)	Gold	15,000^{*}
France (SNEP)	Gold	50,000^{*}
Ireland (IRMA)	2× Platinum	30,000^{^}
Netherlands (NVPI)	Gold	30,000^{^}
United Kingdom (BPI)	2× Platinum	600,000^{*}
Summaries
Europe (IFPI)	Platinum	1,000,000^{*}
^{*} Sales figures based on certification alone.^{^} Shipments figures based on certification alone.
