= New Zealand top 50 singles of 2002 =

This is a list of top 50 singles of 2002 in New Zealand

== Chart ==
Key
‡ – Single of New Zealand origin

Number	Artist	Single
1	Avril Lavigne	"Complicated"
2	Vanessa Carlton	"A Thousand Miles"
3	Liberty X	"Just A Little"
4	Eminem	"Without Me"
5	Shakira	"Whenever Wherever"
6	Bic Runga	"Get Some Sleep"
7	The Calling	"Wherever You Will Go"
8	Incubus	"Are You In?"
9	DJ Sammy	"The Boys of Summer"
10	Alex Lloyd	"Amazing"
11	Anika Moa	"Falling in Love Again"
12	Ronan Keating	"If Tomorrow Never Comes"
13	Enrique Iglesias	"Escape"
14	Shakira	"Underneath Your Clothes"
15	Darren Hayes	"Insatiable"
16	Pink	"Don't Let Me Get Me"
17	Katchafire	"Giddy Up"
18	Goodshirt	"Sophie"^{‡}
19	Sophie Ellis-Bextor	"Get Over You"
20	Elvis vs JXL	"A Little Less Conversation"
21	Nesian Mystik	"It's On"^{‡}
22	Nelly	"Hot in Herre"
23	Sophie Ellis-Bextor	"Murder on the Dancefloor"
24	Westlife	"World of Our Own"
25	Wyclef Jean	"Two Wrongs"
26	Enrique Iglesias	"Hero"
27	Nelly feat. Kelly Rowland	"Dilemma"
28	Pink	"Just Like a Pill"
29	Alicia Keys	"A Woman's Worth"
30	Mary J. Blige	"Family Affair"
31	Nickelback	"How You Remind Me"
32	Five for Fighting	"Superman (It's Not Easy)"
33	K'Lee	"Can You Feel Me?"^{‡}
34	Pink	"Get the Party Started"
35	No Doubt	"Hey Baby"
36	Blue	"Fly By"
37	Kylie Minogue	"Love at First Sight"
38	Atomic Kitten	"Tide Is High"
39	Natalie Imbruglia	"Wrong Impression"
40	Jewel	"Standing Still"
41	Kasey Chambers	"Not Pretty Enough"
42	John Mayer	"No Such Thing"
43	Blue	"If You Come Back"
44	Sugababes	"Round Round"
45	A1	"Caught in the Middle"
46	Enrique Iglesias	"Don't Turn Off the Lights"
47	Michelle Branch	"All You Wanted"
48	Carly Binding	"Alright with Me"^{‡}
49	Shakira	"Objection (Tango)"
50	The Feelers	"Communicate"^{‡}

== Chart by numbers ==
=== Origin ===
==== By artist ====
The following shows the country of origin from where the artist (including any featured artist where applicable) originate from. Artists who appear more than once have only been tallied once.

Country	Total
United States	19
New Zealand	8
England	7
Australia	5
Spain	3
Canada	2
Ireland	2
Colombia	1
Haiti	1
Netherlands	1
Scotland	1

Notes
- Shakira was born in Colombia but is based in the United States and Spain and as such all three countries have been tallied.
- Wyclef Jean was born in Haiti but raised in the United States and as such both countries have been included in his tally.
- Elvis Presley is from the United States and JXL is from the Netherlands, both have been tallied separately.
- A1 contains members from both England and Norway, both members Ben Adams and Christian Ingebrigtsen have been tallied for their respective countries, with England included as the groups base.
- Although born in Australia, Natalie Imbruglia was raised in England and Australia and both have been included in her tally, but counted as Australia for single origin.
- Kylie Minogue although born in Australia, is based in England and Australia.

==== By single ====
The following shows the country of origin from which the singles originate regardless of who the artist is.

Country	Total
United States	16
New Zealand	8
England	7
Australia	5
Spain	4
Colombia	3
Canada	2
Ireland	2
Haiti	1
Netherlands	1
Scotland	1

=== Most singles ===
Shows the artists with the most singles to appear in this chart. Includes where they appear as a featured artist, however where a singer (e.g. Kelly Rowland) appears as a guest singer, this does not count towards their groups (e.g. Destiny's Child) tally.

Artist	Total
Enrique Iglesias	3
P!nk	3
Shakira	3
Blue	2
Sophie Ellis-Bextor	2

=== Format ===
The following shows where each single appears on, whether it was the artists album, a non-album single, an extended play or as part of a soundtrack.

Format	Total
Albums	45
Soundtracks	3
non-album singles	2
EP	1

Notes
- The song "A Little Less Conversation" by Elvis vs JXL appears on the soundtrack for Ocean's Eleven and the album ELV1S: 30 No. 1 Hits.
- The song "Without Me" by Eminem appears on the album The Eminem Show and the soundtrack for 8 Mile.
- The song "No Such Thing" by John Mayer appears on the extended play Inside Wants Out and the album Room for Squares.
- The song "If Tomorrow Never Comes" is a cover of the Garth Brooks song and appears as a non-album single in its original form, but Ronan Keating's version is on Destination.

=== Multiple releases ===
The following shows singles that had multiple releases from the same album.

Title	Total	Singles
Escape (Enrique Iglesias)	3	Escape; Hero; Don't Turn Off the Lights
Laundry Service (Shakira)	3	Whenever, Wherever; Underneath Your Clothes; Objection (Tango)
Missundaztood (Pink)	3	Don't Let Me Get Me; Just Like a Pill; Get the Party Started
Read My Lips (Sophie Ellis-Bextor)	2	Murder on the Dancefloor; Get Over You
All Rise (Blue)	2	Fly By; If You Come Back

=== Type ===
The following shows the denomination that each single was released as, whether as a solo artist or as part of a group, band or duo. Also shows how many singles had guest artists.

Type	Total
Solo artists	32
Groups	15
Featured Artists	3
Collaborations	1

Notes
- Elvis vs JXL has been regarded as a collaboration.
- Nelly feat. Kelly Rowland - "Dilemma" has been counted as a solo artist with a featured artist.
- Wyclef Jean feat. Claudette Ortiz - "Two Wrongs" has been counted as a solo artist with a featured artist.

=== Top Genre ===
The following shows the most common genres the Top 50 singles are regarded as (as per their genre descriptions in the singles entries. Where a genre was not noted, the genre of the album/extended play was used instead. Subgenres have been split as separate entries.

Genre	Total	Singles
Pop	27	A Thousand Miles (Vanessa Carlton); Amazing (Alex Lloyd); All You Wanted (Michelle Branch); Caught in the Middle (A1); Communicate (The Feelers); Don't Let Me Get Me (Pink); Escape (Enrique Iglesias); Falling in Love Again (Anika Moa); Fly By (Blue); Get Over You (Sophie Ellis-Bextor); Get Some Sleep (Bic Runga); Giddy Up (Katchafire); Hero (Enrique Iglesias); If You Come Back (Blue); Insatiable (Darren Hayes); It's On (Nesian Mystik); Just A Little (Liberty X); Love at First Sight (Kylie Minogue); Murder on the Dancefloor (Sophie Ellis-Bextor); Not Pretty Enough (Kasey Chambers); Round Round (Sugababes); Sophie (Goodshirt); Standing Still (Jewel); Tide Is High (Atomic Kitten); World of Our Own (Westlife); Wrong Impression (Natalie Imbruglia)
Rock	12	Are You In? (Incubus); Complicated (Avril Lavigne); How You Remind Me (Nickelback); Superman (It's Not Easy) (Five for Fighting); Wherever You Will Go (The Calling); No Such Thing (John Mayer); Sophie (Goodshirt); Communicate (The Feelers); Standing Still (Jewel); All You Wanted (Michelle Branch); Wrong Impression (Natalie Imbruglia); Get Some Sleep (Bic Runga)
Pop rock	8	Complicated (Avril Lavigne); Wherever You Will Go (The Calling); Don't Let Me Get Me (Pink); Just Like a Pill (Pink); Superman (It's Not Easy) (Five for Fighting); All You Wanted (Michelle Branch); Wrong Impression (Natalie Imbruglia); Standing Still (Jewel)
R&B	7	A Woman's Worth (Alicia Keys); Dilemma (Nelly feat. Kelly Rowland); Family Affair (Mary J Blige); Just A Little (Liberty X); Can You Feel Me? (K'Lee); Alright with Me (Carly Binding); It's On (Nesian Mystik)
Dance-pop	5	Get Over You (Sophie Ellis-Bextor); Murder on the Dancefloor (Sophie Ellis-Bextor); Love at First Sight (Kylie Minogue); Round Round (Sugababes); Tide Is High (Atomic Kitten)
Hip hop	5	Without Me (Eminem); Hot in Herre (Nelly); It's On (Nesian Mystik); Hey Baby (No Doubt); Two Wrongs (Wyclef Jean)
Dance	4	Just A Little (Liberty X); Murder on the Dancefloor (Sophie Ellis-Bextor); The Boys of Summer (DJ Sammy); A Little Less Conversation (Elvis vs JXL)
Country	3	If Tomorrow Never Comes (Ronan Keating); Not Pretty Enough (Kasey Chambers); Can You Feel Me? (K'Lee)
Reggae	3	Giddy Up (Katchafire); Hey Baby (No Doubt); Tide Is High (Atomic Kitten)
Alternative rock	2	Are You In? (Incubus); How You Remind Me (Nickelback)
Disco	2	Get Over You (Sophie Ellis-Bextor); Murder on the Dancefloor (Sophie Ellis-Bextor)
Electronic	2	The Boys of Summer (DJ Sammy); A Little Less Conversation (Elvis vs JXL)
Funk	2	A Little Less Conversation (Elvis vs JXL); Family Affair (Mary J Blige)
Latin	2	Whenever, Wherever (Shakira); Objection (Tango) (Shakira)
Soft rock	2	Superman (It's Not Easy) (Five for Fighting); No Such Thing (John Mayer)

=== Top Labels ===
The following shows the most common record labels that a single was associated with. Any label that only had one single has not been noted.

Label	Total	Singles
Columbia Records	6	Don't Let Me Get Me (Pink); Just Like a Pill (Pink); Get the Party Started (Pink); Superman (It's Not Easy) (Five for Fighting); No Such Thing (John Mayer); Wrong Impression (Natalie Imbruglia)
Epic Records	5	Whenever, Wherever (Shakira); Underneath Your Clothes (Shakira); Objection (Tango) (Shakira); Giddy Up (Katchafire); It's On (Nesian Mystik)
Arista Records	3	Complicated (Avril Lavigne); Insatiable (Darren Hayes); A Woman's Worth (Alicia Keys)
Interscope Records	3	Escape (Enrique Iglesias); Hero (Enrique Iglesias); Don't Turn Off the Lights (Enrique Iglesias)
Universal	3	Without Me (Eminem); Hot in Herre (Nelly); Dilemma (Nelly feat. Kelly Rowland)
Polydor Records	2	If Tomorrow Never Comes (Ronan Keating); Round Round (Sugababes)
RCA Records	2	Wherever You Will Go (The Calling); Are You In? (Incubus)
Sony	2	Falling in Love Again (Anika Moa); Can You Feel Me? (K'Lee)
Jive Records	2	Fly By (Blue); If You Come Back (Blue)

=== Top songwriters ===
The following shows the songwriters who had the most top-selling singles of 2002 in New Zealand.

Writer	Total	Singles
Enrique Iglesias	3	Escape (Enrique Iglesias); Hero (Enrique Iglesias); Don't Turn Off the Lights (Enrique Iglesias)
Shakira Mebarak	3	Whenever, Wherever (Shakira); Underneath Your Clothes (Shakira); Objection (Tango) (Shakira)
Linda Perry	2	Get the Party Started (Pink); BeautifulChristina Aguilera
Dallas Austin	2	Don't Let Me Get Me (Pink); Just Like a Pill (Pink)
Sophie Ellis-Bextor	2	Get Over You (Sophie Ellis-Bextor); Murder on the Dancefloor (Sophie Ellis-Bextor)
Lee Ryan	2	Fly By (Blue); If You Come Back (Blue)

=== Most/Least songwriters ===
The following shows the singles that were credited as having been written by only one person and the singles that had the most credited writers of 2002.

Single	Total	Songwriter/s
"A Thousand Miles" (Vanessa Carlton)	1	Vanessa Carlton
"Get Some Sleep" (Bic Runga)	1	Bic Runga
"Amazing" (Alex Lloyd)	1	Alex Lloyd
"Insatiable" (Darren Hayes)	1	Darren Hayes
"Not Pretty Enough" (Kasey Chambers)	1	Kasey Chambers
"Superman (It's Not Easy)" (Five for Fighting)	1	John Ondrasik
"A Little Less Conversation" (Elvis vs JXL)	6	Mac Davis; Billy Strange; Elvis Presley; Tom Holkenborg; Liz Gillies; T. S. Eliot

=== Top producers ===
The following shows the producers who had the most singles to appear on this chart.

Producer	Total	Singles
Enrique Iglesias	3	Escape (Enrique Iglesias); Hero (Enrique Iglesias); Don't Turn Off the Lights (Enrique Iglesias)
Shakira Mebarak	3	Whenever, Wherever (Shakira); Underneath Your Clothes (Shakira); Objection (Tango) (Shakira)
Dallas Austin	2	Don't Let Me Get Me (Pink); Just Like a Pill (Pink)
Tor E. Hermansen	2	Fly By (Blue); If You Come Back (Blue)
Mikkel S. Eriksen	2	Fly By (Blue); If You Come Back (Blue)
Gregg Alexander	2	Murder on the Dancefloor (Sophie Ellis-Bextor); Get Over You (Sophie Ellis-Bextor)
