= Young Forever (The Ready Set song) =

2011 single by The Ready Set

Single by The Ready Set

from the EP Feel Good Now
- B-side: "Operator"
- Released: March 1, 2011
- Recorded: 2011
- Genre: Pop; electropop
- Length: 3:26
- Label: Sire
- Songwriters: Jordan Witzigreuter; Kara DioGuardi; Niles Hollowell-Dhar
- Producer: The Cataracs

The Ready Set singles chronology
"More Than Alive" (2010)	"Young Forever" (2011)	"Hollywood Dream" (2011)

Music video
- "Young Forever" on YouTube

"Young Forever" is a song by American electropop artist The Ready Set. It was released on March 1, 2011, as the lead single from his EP, Feel Good Now. The song was serviced to radio in the United States on March 15, 2011.

== Background ==
"Young Forever" was inspired when The Ready Set first started out, touring and focusing on staying positive. Witzigreuter described the song as "different" from other songs he has released. In an interview with The Oakland Post he explained:

"I'm really excited that the second single is as different as it is from 'Love Like Woe' because I don't want to be the artist that puts out the same song over and over trying to get a successful single or something."

The song was made available for streaming on March 1, 2011. A digital EP was released via iTunes on April 12, which contains the B-side "Operator", along with an acoustic version of "Young Forever" and the music video for "Love Like Woe". A vinyl edition was released on August 16, which includes a cover version of the song by That's Outrageous!. In 2012, Witzigreuter performed the song in an episode of Disney Channel's So Random!.

== Chart performance ==
"Young Forever" peaked at number 39 on the Billboard Mainstream Top 40 and spent three weeks on the chart, as well as peaking at number 45 on the Billboard Pop Digital Song Sales. It also peaked at number five on the Billboard Bubbling Under Hot 100 chart.

== Music video ==
The music video for "Young Forever" premiered on MTV on April 19, 2011, and currently has 6.2 million views. In the video, Witzigreuter uses a "Freeze Time" iPhone app to suspend the movements of other people in the hotel aside from a couple of female fans and his backing band. Throughout the video, they are seen throwing streamers in the hallways, bombing unsuspecting people with silly string and raising havoc. The band is also seen rocking out in the hotel lobby.

The video was shot in Baltimore and according to Witzigreuter, the idea for the video went back and forth with different video directors before they decided the concept to have something to do with freezing time. Aspiring actress and singer Madison McFarland, who played one of the female fans in the video, revealed that it took 17 hours to shoot.

== Track listing ==
Digital download – single
No.	Title	Length
1.	"Young Forever"	3:24

Digital download – EP
No.	Title	Length
1.	"Young Forever"	3:24
2.	"Operator"	3:18
3.	"Young Forever (Acoustic)"	3:25
4.	"Love Like Woe"	3:39

7" Vinyl
No.	Title	Length
1.	"Young Forever"	3:24
2.	"Young Forever" (That's Outrageous! cover)	3:25

== Charts ==
Chart performance for "Young Forever"
Chart (2011)	Peak position
US Bubbling Under Hot 100 (Billboard)	5
US Pop Airplay (Billboard)	39

== Release history ==
Release dates and formats for "Young Forever"
Region	Date	Format	Label	Ref.
United States	March 1, 2011	CD	Sire	
United States	March 15, 2011	Contemporary hit radio	Sire	
Canada	April 12, 2011	Digital download	Sire	
Japan	April 15, 2011	Digital download	Sire	
United States	August 16, 2011	Vinyl	Rise	
