= Maybe (Enrique Iglesias song) =

2002 single by Enrique Iglesias

Single by Enrique Iglesias

from the album Escape
- B-side: "La chica de ayer"
- Released: 25 November 2002
- Studio: Larrabee (North Hollywood, California); Hit Factory Criteria (Miami, Florida)
- Length: 3:14
- Label: Interscope
- Songwriter(s): Enrique Iglesias; Steve Morales; Kara DioGuardi; David Siegel
- Producer(s): Steve Morales

Enrique Iglesias singles chronology
| "Love to See You Cry" (2002) | "Maybe" (2002) | "Mentiroso" (2002) |

Music video
- "Maybe" on YouTube

"Maybe" is a song written by Enrique Iglesias, Steve Morales, Kara DioGuardi, and David Siegel for Iglesias' second English-language album, Escape (2001). Iglesias stated in many interviews that the song was his favorite track from the album Escape. In 2002, the album was reissued with two new tracks, one of which was a reworking of the song dubbed the "Mark Taylor Mix". This version changed the song from a rhythmic piano based ballad into a slower guitar-driven song. This version of the song was released as the fifth single from the album.

"Maybe" caused minor controversy when Britney Spears debuted a new song during her Dream Within a Dream Tour called "My Love Was Always There", which features similar lyrics to the chorus of Iglesias's "Maybe" as well as the same melody throughout the song. The single was released on 25 November 2002, reaching number one in Romania and becoming a top-40 hit in Ireland, the Netherlands, New Zealand, and the United Kingdom.

== Track listings ==
European CD single

1. "Maybe" (Mark Taylor mix)
2. "Maybe" (album version)

UK CD1

1. "Maybe" (Mark Taylor's mix)
2. "Hero" (from The One and Only)
3. "Maybe" (from The One and Only)
4. "Maybe" (CD-ROM video)

UK CD2

1. "Maybe" (Mark Taylor's Mix)
2. "La chica de ayer" (album version)
3. "Love to See You Cry" (from The One and Only)

UK cassette single

1. "Maybe" (Mark Taylor mix)
2. "Hero" (from The One and Only)

Australian CD single

1. "Maybe" (Mark Taylor mix)
2. "Maybe" (album version)
3. "Don't Turn Off the Lights" (Fernando Garibay & Giorgio Moroder remix edit)
4. "La chica de ayer" (album version)
5. "Don't Turn Off the Lights" (video)

== Credits and personnel ==
Credits are lifted from the Escape album booklet.

Studios

- Recorded at Larrabee Studios (North Hollywood, California) and Hit Factory Criteria (Miami, Florida)
- Mastered at Bernie Grundman Mastering Studio (Hollywood, California)

Personnel

- Enrique Iglesias – writing, vocals, co-production, vocal production
- Steve Morales – writing, background vocals, production, vocal production
- Kara DioGuardi – writing, background vocals, vocal production
- David Siegel – writing, keyboards
- Aaron Fishbein – acoustic and electric guitar
- Lee Levin – drums
- Dave Way – mixing
- Shane Stoner – engineering
- Fabian Marasciullo – engineering
- Marc Lee – assistant engineering
- Ivy Skoff – production coordination
- Brian Gardner – mastering

== Charts ==
=== Weekly charts ===
| Chart (2002–2003) | Peak position |
|---|---|
| Australia (ARIA) | 41 |
| Belgium (Ultratop 50 Flanders) | 45 |
| Belgium (Ultratip Bubbling Under Wallonia) | 15 |
| Europe (Eurochart Hot 100) | 38 |
| Germany (GfK) | 62 |
| Ireland (IRMA) | 16 |
| Italy (FIMI) | 43 |
| Netherlands (Dutch Top 40) | 21 |
| Netherlands (Single Top 100) | 22 |
| New Zealand (Recorded Music NZ) | 29 |
| Romania (Romanian Top 100) | 1 |
| Scotland (OCC) | 8 |
| Sweden (Sverigetopplistan) | 53 |
| Switzerland (Schweizer Hitparade) | 44 |
| UK Singles (OCC) | 12 |

=== Year-end charts ===
| Chart (2003) | Position |
|---|---|
| Romania (Romanian Top 100) | 8 |

== Release history ==
| Region | Date | Format(s) | Label(s) | Ref(s). |
|---|---|---|---|---|
| United Kingdom | 25 November 2002 | CD; cassette | Interscope | |
| Australia | 12 January 2003 | CD | Interscope | |

== See also ==
- List of Romanian Top 100 number ones of the 2000s
