= The Oakland Post =

The Oakland Post may refer to:

- The Oakland Post (California), San Francisco East Bay news weekly
- The Oakland Post (Michigan), Oakland University news weekly
