= Frankie Storm =

American singer-songwriter

- Born: Tawanna Knicia Dabney; Philadelphia, Pennsylvania, United States
- Occupations: Singer-songwriter; vocal producer
- Years active: 2005–present
- Musical career
- Genres: R&B; pop; EDM
- Instrument: Vocals
- Website: https://frankiestorm.com/

Tawanna Knicia Dabney, known professionally as Frankie Storm, is an American singer-songwriter. A frequent collaborator of producers Stargate, OAK, Matrax, KayGee, and Espionage, she is best known for co-writing hit songs such as Rihanna's "Don't Stop the Music", Jay Sean's "Do You Remember", and Jennifer Lopez's "Hold It Don't Drop It."

== Career ==
=== Early life ===
Dabney, originally from Philadelphia, began singing at three, which evolved into participation in local area choirs.

=== Entry into songwriting ===
After a local rapper heard her singing and requested her vocals for a hook, Dabney began songwriting. She would next work with notable Philadelphia producers Dre & Vidal and The Matrax who helped further hone her skills and placed her first songs: several co-writes for Canadian crossover artist Keshia Chanté, and the title track of the fourth 3LW album Point Of No Return. The 3LW project was later shelved when the group decided to go on hiatus, but Dabney continued to write, moving to New York City for more songwriting opportunities. This led to work with New Jersey-based producer KayGee who placed her co-writes on albums from Brooke Hogan, Stacie Orrico, and Jaheim.

== Discography ==
=== Selected songwriting credits ===
Title	Year	Artist	Album
"Point Of No Return"	2006	3LW	Point Of No Return (Shelved)
"I'm Not Missing You"	2006	Stacie Orrico	Beautiful Awakening
"Take Me Away"	2006	Stacie Orrico	Beautiful Awakening
"Don't Ask Me to Stay"	2006	Stacie Orrico	Beautiful Awakening
"Been Gone"	2006	Keshia Chanté	2U
"2U"	2006	Keshia Chanté	2U
"Summer Love"	2006	Keshia Chanté	2U
"Sorry"	2006	Keshia Chanté	2U
"Love You, Hate You"	2006	Brooke Hogan	Undiscovered
"Incognito"	2006	Brooke Hogan	Undiscovered
"Don't Stop the Music"	2007	Rihanna	Good Girl Gone Bad
"Cry"	2007	Rihanna	Good Girl Gone Bad
"Hold It Don't Drop It"	2007	Jennifer Lopez	Brave
"I've Changed" (featuring Keyshia Cole)	2007	Jaheim	The Makings of a Man
"Now You Tell Me"	2007	Jordin Sparks	Jordin Sparks
"Takin' Back My Love" (featuring Ciara)	2008	Enrique Iglesias	Greatest Hits
"Can You Hear Me"	2008	Enrique Iglesias	Greatest Hits
"Lace and Leather"	2008	Britney Spears	Circus
"Entertainment" (Unreleased)	2008	Britney Spears	Circus
"Told You So"	2008	Jesse McCartney	Departure
"Up/Down"	2008	Jessica Mauboy	Been Waiting
"Heavy Rotation"	2008	Anastacia	Heavy Rotation
"Anti-Love Song"	2008	Raven-Symoné	Raven-Symoné
"In the Pictures"	2008	Raven-Symoné	Raven-Symoné
"In Your Skin"	2008	Raven-Symoné	Raven-Symoné
"Face to Face" (Thick Girls, Big Girls Deluxe EP)	2008	Raven-Symoné	Raven-Symoné
"Next" (Thick Girls, Big Girls Deluxe EP)	2008	Raven-Symoné	Raven-Symoné
"Hand It Over"	2008	Alesha Dixon	The Alesha Show
"Give Me the Music"	2008	Eva Avila	Give Me the Music
"Do You Remember" (featuring Sean Paul & Lil Jon)	2009	Jay Sean	All or Nothing
"Walking On Snow"	2009	Jordin Sparks	Battlefield
"Always"	2009	Elliott Yamin	Fight for Love
"Tell Me Lies"	2009	Ashley Tisdale	Guilty Pleasure
"After Party"	2009	LeToya Luckett	Lady Love
"Tears"	2009	LeToya Luckett	Lady Love
"Avalanche"	2009	Marié Digby	Breathing Underwater
"Know You By Heart"	2009	Marié Digby	Breathing Underwater
"Overboard" (featuring Livvi Franc)	2009	Marié Digby	Breathing Underwater
"Come to Life"	2009	Marié Digby	Breathing Underwater
"Crazier Things"	2009	Marié Digby	Breathing Underwater
"Make It Happen"	2009	Marié Digby	Breathing Underwater
"Surrender"	2009	Marié Digby	Breathing Underwater
"Fit Of Love"	2009	Ciara	Fantasy Ride
"One Day at a Time" (featuring Akon)	2010	Enrique Iglesias	Euphoria
"Naughty Cupid"	2010	Rainie Yang	Rainie & Love...?
"New York City Gurls" (featuring Onasis)	2010	Kat DeLuna	Inside Out: The Mixtape
"Calling You"	2010	Kat DeLuna	Inside Out: The Mixtape & Inside Out
"Never Always"	2011	Jake Zyrus	Infinity
"Riot!"	2011	Cher Lloyd	Sticks and Stones
"Travel the World (Love Uses Time)"	2011	Keke Wyatt	Unbelievable
"Stars"	2011	Parade	Parade
"Sing About Me"	2013	Angel Haze	Dirty Gold
"Saturday Sunday"	2015	Kat Dahlia	My Garden
"Mirror"	2015	Kat Dahlia	My Garden
"Walk on Water"	2015	Kat Dahlia	My Garden

== Awards and nominations ==
Year	Ceremony	Award	Result	Ref
2009	BMI Pop Awards	Award-Winning Pop Songs ("Don't Stop the Music")	Won	
2011	BMI Pop Awards	Award-Winning Pop Songs ("Do You Remember")	Won	
2011	BMI London Awards	Award-Winning Pop Songs ("Do You Remember")	Won	
