= Can You Hear Me (Enrique Iglesias song) =

Single by Enrique Iglesias

from the album Greatest Hits
- Released: 27 June 2008
- Recorded: 2008
- Genre: Europop
- Length: 3:44
- Label: Interscope
- Songwriters: Enrique Iglesias, Steve Morales, Frankie Storm
- Producers: Big Ben Diehl, Carlos Paucar

Enrique Iglesias singles chronology
| "¿Dónde Están Corazón?" (2007) | "Can You Hear Me" (2008) | "Lloro Por Ti" (2008) |

Music video
- "Can You Hear Me" on YouTube

"Can You Hear Me" is the official song of UEFA Euro 2008 held in Austria and Switzerland. It is performed by Enrique Iglesias, who wrote the song with Steve Morales and Frankie Storm. The song was produced by Big Ben Diehl and Carlos Paucar, and recorded at Circle House Studios in Miami, Florida. The song received generally negative reviews, but achieved success in many European countries where it was a top ten hit.

The song served as Iglesias' third UK single from his Greatest Hits album in June 2009 but failed to enter the UK Top 200.

== Background ==
The choice of this song was announced by UEFA on 20 May, and Iglesias was described as the perfect person for the job. "He is an international star who is passionate about football and who has European roots", said commercial director Philippe Margraff. The artist himself was happy to be chosen; "I'm really pleased to be able to contribute to the football festival in Switzerland and Austria and it is an honour for me to perform at the final", said Iglesias.

The song was performed at the closing game in Vienna on 29 June. The single was released on 26 May, and the video—featuring football tricks and dancing, intercut with Iglesias performing—was directed by Paul Minor. "Can You Hear Me" will also feature on a re-issue of Iglesias' Insomniac album in France, Belgium, Switzerland, Austria, and Italy.

There is also a special UEFA Euro 2008 Remix to the song, which contains a part from the UEFA Euro 2008 Official Theme song in the beginning of the song.

== Reception ==
Media reaction to the song has largely been negative, most finding it inappropriate for the venue. Darryl Broadfoot, of the Scottish newspaper The Herald, called it a "cheesy, synth-driven melody". The Norwegian newspaper Dagbladet, in reviewing the song, found that it lacked purpose and motivation, and that it had little to do with football. The reviewers called the song a rejected B-side, and gave it one out of six points. Nick Amies, of Deutsche Welle, called "Can You Hear Me" an "insipid and un-footie-inspiring, corporate sell-out single". He also reported that spectators preferred the song "Seven Nation Army" by The White Stripes as an alternative, unofficial anthem.

== Track listings ==
CD1

1. "Can You Hear Me" (Main version) — 3:44
2. "Can You Hear Me" (UEFA remix) — 5:54

CD2

1. "Can You Hear Me" (Main version) — 3:44
2. "Can You Hear Me" (Moto Blanco radio mix) — 3:30
3. "Can You Hear Me" (Moto Blanco club mix) — 8:30
4. "Can You Hear Me" (Moto Blanco dub) — 8:00

Europe

1. "Can You Hear Me" (Main version) — 3:44
2. "Can You Hear Me" (Moto Blanco radio mix) — 3:30
3. "Can You Hear Me" (Moto Blanco club mix) — 8:30
4. "Can You Hear Me" (UEFA remix) — 5:54

France

1. "Can You Hear Me" (Main Version) - 3:44
2. "Can You Hear Me" (Glam As You Full Club Mix by Guena LG) - 6:57
3. "Can You Hear Me" (Moto Blanco Club Mix) - 8:30

== Charts ==
=== Weekly charts ===
| Chart (2008) | Peak position |
|---|---|
| Austria (Ö3 Austria Top 40) | 17 |
| Belgium (Ultratop 50 Flanders) | 12 |
| Belgium (Ultratip Bubbling Under Wallonia) | 9 |
| Bulgaria (IFPI) | 6 |
| CIS Airplay (TopHit) | 46 |
| Czech Republic (Rádio Top 100) | 1 |
| Finland (Suomen virallinen lista) | 5 |
| France (SNEP) | 21 |
| Germany (GfK) | 14 |
| Ireland (IRMA) | 43 |
| Netherlands (Dutch Top 40) | 1 |
| Netherlands (Single Top 100) | 2 |
| Norway (VG-lista) | 7 |
| Slovakia (Rádio Top 100) | 15 |
| Sweden (Sverigetopplistan) | 6 |
| Switzerland (Schweizer Hitparade) | 2 |

=== Year-end charts ===
| Chart (2008) | Position |
|---|---|
| Belgium (Ultratop Flanders) | 76 |
| CIS (Tophit) | 171 |
| Netherlands (Dutch Top 40) | 24 |
| Netherlands (Single Top 100) | 25 |
| Sweden (Sverigetopplistan) | 75 |
| Switzerland (Schweizer Hitparade) | 34 |

== See also ==
- Dutch Top 40 number-one hits of 2008
