= Away (Enrique Iglesias song) =

Single by Enrique Iglesias featuring Sean Garrett

from the album Greatest Hits
- Released: 11 November 2008
- Recorded: 2008
- Genre: Pop; R&B
- Length: 4:00 (album version); 3:48 (radio edit)
- Label: Interscope
- Songwriters: Fernando Garibay; Garrett Hamler
- Producers: Fernando Garibay; Sean Garrett

Enrique Iglesias singles chronology
"Lloro Por Ti" (2008)	"Away" (2008)	"Takin' Back My Love" (2009)

Sean Garrett singles chronology
"What Them Girls Like" (2008)	"Away" (2008)	"Lay Up Under Me" (2008)

Music video
- "Enrique Iglesias - Away ft. Sean Garrett" on YouTube

"Away" is the first single from Spanish singer Enrique Iglesias' album Greatest Hits. The song features vocals from American singer Sean Garrett. The single was released on 11 November 2008. "Away" was originally intended to be on Garrett's debut solo album Turbo 919, but the decision was made to include it on Iglesias' album instead. The song debuted on the UK Singles Chart, at number 132 on the week of the physical single release.

== Music video ==
The video was directed by Anthony Mandler. The video premiered on Total Request Live on 12 November 2008. The video features a cameo by Garrett. In the video, Iglesias is seen walking through the desert, looking back at the horrible crash in which he has died while his girlfriend, played by Niki Huey, cries hysterically. Most of the video was shot in the desert.

== Track listing ==
UK CD single

1. "Away" (Edit) – 3:48
2. "Away" (Moto Blanco Club Mix) – 7:48

UK digital download

1. "Away" (Edit) – 3:48
2. "Miss You" (featuring Nâdiya) – 3:55
3. "Away" (Music Video) – 4:38

== Charts ==
=== Weekly charts ===
Chart (2008–2009)	Peak position
Belgium (Ultratip Bubbling Under Flanders)	23
Czech Republic Airplay Chart	70
Slovakia Airplay Chart	63
UK Singles Chart	132
U.S. Billboard Hot Dance Club Play	1

=== Year-end charts ===
Chart (2009)	Peak position
US Hot Dance Club Songs (Billboard)	23

== See also ==
- List of number-one dance singles of 2009 (U.S.)
