= Takin' Back My Love =

2009 single by Enrique Iglesias featuring Ciara

- Cover for the Ciara version

Single by Enrique Iglesias featuring Ciara or Sarah Connor or Tyssem

from the album Greatest Hits
- Released: 12 January 2009
- Recorded: 2008
- Genre: Europop
- Length: 3:51
- Label: Interscope
- Songwriters: Enrique M. Iglesias; Frankie Storm; Nadir Khayat
- Producer: RedOne

Enrique Iglesias singles chronology
"Away" (2008)	"Takin' Back My Love" (2009)	"Gracias a Ti" (2009)

Ciara singles chronology
"Go Girl" (2008)	"Takin' Back My Love" (2009)	"Never Ever" (2009)

Sarah Connor singles chronology
"I'll Kiss It Away" (2008)	"Takin' Back My Love" (2009)	"Cold as Ice" (2010)

"Takin' Back My Love" is a song by Spanish singer Enrique Iglesias featuring American singer Ciara. It was released as the second single from his English greatest hits album Greatest Hits (2008). The song was produced by RedOne who was a co-writer of the song alongside Iglesias and Frankie Storm.

The original version of the song features Ciara and was released internationally. A second version which features German singer Sarah Connor in place of Ciara was released in Germany, the Netherlands, Switzerland, Austria, Poland and other parts of Central Europe. In France, the song was re-recorded with French R&B Tyssem singing her portion of the song in French and retitled "Takin' Back My Love (Sans l'ombre d'un remord)".

== Release and promotion ==
Iglesias first performed the song in on the French TV show Star Academy as a duet with one of the contestants, Gaultier. The performance was enthusiastically received by the show's audience and the judges who gave the pair a standing ovation. This performance propelled the Ciara version of the song debut at #3 in France.

Iglesias and Ciara both performed the single for the first time at the 2009 Pro Bowl Half-time Show in Hawaii.

Due to studio commitments, Ciara had to pull out of promotion for the single and Australian singer Gabriella Cilmi was asked to lend her vocals to most of the European promo. They performed the song on the Dutch TV show Life & Cooking, The Paul O'Grady Show, Loose Women and The Alan Titchmarsh Show in the United Kingdom as well as the Meteor Music Awards in Ireland.

Iglesias performed the song with Connor on the German show "Nur die Liebe zählt".

Ciara performed the single alone in London, as a part of her set during the European leg of Britney Spears' worldwide tour The Circus Starring Britney Spears.

Iglesias and Ciara both performed the single for the second time together in London, at the 2009 Capital FM Summertime Ball.

== Critical reception ==
Digital Spy said that "Takin' Back My Love" finds Iglesias acting out a break-up with 'Goodies' singer Ciara. 'Go ahead just leave, can't hold you, you're free', he wails with typical passion. Not too keen on her impending single status, Ciara replies: 'What did I do but give love to you? I'm just confused as I stand here and look at you.' With its Europoppy beat and suitably dramatic chorus, this manages to pack an emotional punch while also remaining appealingly cheesy".

Billboard gave the song a positive review: "Thanks to a global fan base, Enrique Iglesias' dance duet "Takin' Back My Love" is already a hit on the European Hot 100 and a top 10 in Germany and France. RedOne, best known for his framework on Kat DeLuna's 'Whine Up' and Lady GaGa's two recent No. 1s, lends his party song production talents. Pop star Sarah Connor recorded a version with Iglesias, which has been popular in Europe, but Ciara is better paired with the Latin pop star, with their soft and sensual vocal styles. The synth sounds pinball off one another as Iglesias belts through the choruses and Ciara's panting rounds out the single, which is also riding the Hot Dance Club Play chart".

== Music video ==
The video was shot in Los Angeles on 13 January 2009 and directed by the Norwegian director Ray Kay, who helmed Christina Milian's "Us Against the World" clip, amongst many other videos for R&B music artists. The video was released in February 2009.

The entire music video is shot under blue-screen to give off a radiant but monotone color set. The music video opens up viewing portraits of Iglesias and Ciara, then an ironic switch showing the two arguing and pushing back and forth outside of the house. The two part ways, and the song begins with Iglesias's first verse. He sings as the video randomly shoots back to a scene where Ciara is up against a wall. The chorus enters as Iglesias is shown throwing things off a counter and out of drawers.

The next verse enters Ciara walking in the room apparently angry at Iglesias. As she sings her verse, she proceeds to pick up a jacket that reads "From C, with Love" and heads to the pool and throws the jacket in the water. What ensues shortly after is a back and forth argument involving the two destroying the house, from Iglesias throwing dishes and glasses out of the refrigerator, to Ciara burning songbooks and pouring paint on top of his car. Then, the two briefly meet in the dining room of the house, where they obviously still have feelings for one another. They then kiss and perform sexual dance-like moves against each other. Then, as Ciara comes back to reality and snatches his hand from her, the two immediately go right back to arguing and destroying what is left of the house. As the video closes, the two are seen in a destroyed dining room with lights flickering on and off, approaching each other once again. Iglesias then grabs Ciara, and the video ends with the two kissing and smiling.

A music video for the version featuring Sarah Connor was released in March 2009, it is intercut with scenes from the music video that was made for the version featuring Ciara.

The Connor version shows the same story (including Ciara) but instead of the scenes where Ciara sings in front of a wall, Connor is shown singing and dancing in a room that seems to be in the same house that Iglesias and Ciara are destroying. The video also randomly shoots to a scene where Iglesias confesses his actions to Connor, implying that Connor sings the emotions and thoughts of Ciara. Pictures of Ciara can be seen in the video with Connor.

The Ciara version music video has been viewed over 236 million times on YouTube.

== Formats and track listings ==
UK digital single (Released: 23 March 2009)

1. "Takin' Back My Love" (feat. Ciara) - 3:51
2. "Takin' Back My Love" (feat. Ciara) (Moto Blanco Radio Mix) - 3:51
3. "Takin' Back My Love" (Video) - 3:57

France CD single (Released: 9 March 2009)

1. "Takin' Back My Love" (feat. Tyssem) (Sans L'Ombre D'Un Remord) - 3:51
2. "Takin' Back My Love" (feat. Ciara) (Main Version) - 3:51
3. "Takin' Back My Love" (feat. Ciara) (Junior Caldera Club Remix) - 5:20
4. "Takin' Back My Love" (feat. Ciara) (Glam As You Club Mix) - 7:59

German CD single (Released: 23 March 2009)

1. "Takin' Back My Love" (feat. Sarah Connor) (Radio Mix) – 3:50
2. "Takin' Back My Love" (feat. Sarah Connor) (Alternate Mix) – 3:50
3. "Takin' Back My Love" (feat. Sarah Connor) (Video) - 3:57

== Charts ==
"Takin' Back My Love" debuted at number three on the French Singles Chart on 17 January 2009, with 3,137 copies sold, being ex aequo with the number-two song.

=== Weekly charts ===
Weekly chart performance for "Takin' Back My Love" (featuring Ciara)
Chart (2009)	Peak position
Australia (ARIA)	200
Belgium (Ultratop 50 Flanders)	7
Belgium (Ultratop 50 Wallonia)	9
CIS Airplay (TopHit)	2
Denmark (Tracklisten)	8
Europe (European Hot 100 Singles)	3
Finland (Suomen virallinen lista)	9
France (SNEP)	2
Global Dance Songs (Billboard)	17
Greece Digital Song Sales (Billboard)	6
Hungary (Rádiós Top 40)	6
Ireland (IRMA)	7
Israel (Media Forest)	1
Netherlands (Dutch Top 40)	5
Netherlands (Single Top 100)	7
Romania Airplay (Media Forest)	1
Russia Airplay (TopHit)	1
Sweden (Sverigetopplistan)	40
Switzerland (Schweizer Hitparade)	23
UK Singles (Official Charts)	12
UK Hip Hop/R&B (Official Charts)	5
US Dance Club Songs (Billboard)	4

Weekly chart performance for "Takin' Back My Love" (featuring Sarah Connor)
Chart (2009)	Peak position
Austria (Ö3 Austria Top 40)	19
Czech Republic (Rádio – Top 100)	12
Germany (GfK)	9

=== Year-end charts ===
2009 year-end chart performance for "Takin' Back My Love" (featuring Ciara)
Chart (2009)	Position
Belgium (Ultratop Flanders)	43
Belgium (Ultratop Wallonia)	35
European Hot 100 Singles (Billboard)	13
France (SNEP)	5
Hungary (Rádiós Top 40)	17
Netherlands (Dutch Top 40)	27
Netherlands (Single Top 100)	66
Russia Airplay (TopHit)	14
UK Singles (OCC)	88
US Dance Club Songs (Billboard)	39

2009 year-end chart performance for "Takin' Back My Love" (featuring Sarah Connor)
Chart (2009)	Position
Germany (Official German Charts)	97

2010 year-end chart performance for "Takin' Back My Love" (featuring Ciara)
Chart (2010)	Position
Hungary (Rádiós Top 40)	97
Russia Airplay (TopHit)	163

=== Decade-end charts ===
Decade-end chart performance for "Takin' Back My Love" (featuring Ciara)
Chart (2000–2009)	Position
CIS Airplay (TopHit)	81
Russia Airplay (TopHit)	99

== Certifications ==
Certifications for "Takin' Back My Love" (featuring Ciara)
Region	Certification	Certified units/sales
Denmark (IFPI Danmark)	Gold	7,500^{^}
United Kingdom (BPI)	Silver	200,000^{^}
^{^} Shipments figures based on certification alone.

== See also ==
- List of Romanian Top 100 number ones of the 2000s
