= I'm Alive, I'm Dreaming =

Studio album by The Ready Set
- Released: June 14, 2010
- Recorded: 2009–10
- Studio: Archwood Music (Van Nuys, CA)
- Genre: Pop; pop rock; synth-pop; electronica
- Length: 25:50 (standard edition); 32:48 (deluxe edition)
- Label: Sire; Decaydance; Beluga Heights
- Producer: J. R. Rotem; Matt Squire; David Siegel; Shane Stoner; Kenneth Mount; Zack Odom; Jon Brown

The Ready Set chronology
Cascades (EP) (2009)	I'm Alive, I'm Dreaming (2010)	Feel Good Now EP (2011)

Singles from I'm Alive, I'm Dreaming
- 1. "Love Like Woe" Released: March 29, 2010; 2. "More Than Alive" Released: May 25, 2010

I'm Alive, I'm Dreaming is the third studio album by American electropop singer-songwriter The Ready Set. It was released on June 14, 2010, through Sire Records, Decaydance, and Beluga Heights. The album debuted at #3 on the Billboard Top Heatseekers chart. The first single from the album, "Love Like Woe", was released on March 29, 2010, and has sold over 1,000,000 downloads in the United States. The deluxe edition includes a re-recorded version of the song "Giants" from his self-released second album Tantrum Castle.

== Background ==
In November 2009, Pete Wentz signed Witzigreuter to his label Decaydance Records. Additionally, Witzigreuter also signed with the label Sire Records. Writing took place in Atlanta and Los Angeles, as well as recording demos. The album was recorded in Los Angeles and was produced by J. R. Rotem, Matt Squire, David Siegel, Shane Stoner, Kenneth Mount, Zack Odom and Jon Brown.

== Composition ==
Witzigreuter began writing the album in 2009 and blends various music genres such as pop, techno and rock. Behind composing the album, he stated, "Some of the songs were recorded over a year ago, and then some of the songs were only recorded a few months ago." He revealed that 30 songs did not make the final cut and that when he chose the final track listing, he wanted to have the "catchiest, best pop songs" he wrote for the album, with help from his management and labels. Witzigreuter also played every instrument on the record. He noted "Spinnin'" as the track he was the most proud of from the album, citing early 90's Michael Jackson influences. He also stated that "There Are Days" was one of his favorite songs written, noting its inspirational feel to it. He stated that the song was "written from the perspective of a ghost watching the world pass by, unable to be a part of it. The ultimate concept behind it is that one day you will not be around, so living life to the fullest is absolutely important."

== Release ==
On March 29, 2010, Witzigreuter released his first single "Love Like Woe". The song peaked at number 27 on the Billboard Hot 100, number one on the Billboard Heatseeker Songs and number 30 on the Canada CHR/Top 40. This led to the song being certified platinum by RIAA and winning the BDS Certified Spin Award based on the 50,000 spins it received. The second single "More Than Alive", was released on May 25, 2010. The music video for both singles were directed by Isaac Ravishankara. "Stays Four The Same" was released as a promotional single in 2009. The album was made available for streaming on his MySpace page on June 8, 2010, before it was officially released on June 14. Physical copies of the album were released the following day, exclusively to Hot Topic.

== Reception ==
Professional ratings
Review scores
Source	Rating
AllMusic	3.5/5 stars
PopMatters	4/10 stars
Review Rinse Repeat	2/5 stars

I'm Alive, I'm Dreaming was met with mixed reviews from music critics. The album was rewarded a 3.5 star rating from William Ruhlmann of AllMusic. He stated, "The Ready Set features bouncy beats and hooks aplenty on every tune, and the vocals are arranged just like those of a boy band." He ended his review remarking, "Witzigreuter still doesn't have his craft quite down, but he's certainly on his way." M Music & Musicians gave a positive review for the album, comparing his work to Brian Wilson's solo music. They noted how the album "packs enough sonic punch to justify repeated listenings." However, they criticized Witzigreuter's use of autotune and believed "he possesses worthwhile vocal skills, not to mention a considerable gift for vocal counterpoint and harmony." Stephen Haag of PopMatters gave a mixed review stating, "It comes across as everything, all the time, in the service of F-U-N, 'tween rock. However, when Witzigreuter dials it down, like he does on the piano pop of 'Melody's Song', the Ready Set could be solid late-period–albeit second-tier–power pop." Sun Sentinel wrote, "The eight featured tracks are melodic and his sound is different. It challenges, yet fits, mainstream music [...] It's a lively album made especially for teens." A negative review came from Review Rinse Repeat, noting that the album felt "shallow and soulless," compared to his earlier albums Tantrum Castle and Syntax and Bright Lights that had more "passion." However, they praised the album's lead single, "Love Like Woe" for its catchy and poppy sound.

In December 2010, I'm Alive, I'm Dreaming was nominated for MTV Buzzworthy's Fan Favorite Album of the Year, ultimately winning the award, beating out Nick Jonas & The Administration's Who I Am.

== Commercial performance ==
The album debuted at number three on the Billboard Heatseekers Albums chart and spent 23 weeks on the chart. It also reached number 172 on the Billboard Top Current Album Sales chart. To support the album, The Ready Set embarked on a 2010 fall tour with Cartel, Hey Monday, This Century, and We Are the In Crowd. He also announced his first headlining tour presented by Glamour Kills, that began in February 2011.

== Track listing ==
The album is mixed by Jon Kaplan and mastered by Dave McNair.

No.	Title	Writer(s)	Producer(s)	Length
1.	"Love Like Woe"	Jordan Witzigreuter; J.R. Rotem	J.R. Rotem	3:20
2.	"More Than Alive"	Witzigreuter; Matt Squire	Squire	3:24
3.	"Limits"	Witzigreuter	Dave Siegel; Shane Stoner	2:40
4.	"Stays Four the Same"	Witzigreuter	Keneth Mount; Zack Odom	3:16
5.	"There Are Days"	Wizigreuter	Squire	3:09
6.	"Spinnin'"	Witzigreuter; Jon Brown	Brown	3:23
7.	"Melody's Song"	Witzigreuter	Mount; Odom	3:26
8.	"Upsets and Downfalls"	Witzigreuter	Siegel; Stoner	3:12
Total length:				25:50

Deluxe version bonus tracks
No.	Title	Length
9.	"The Ghost of Los Angeles"	3:03
10.	"Giants (originally on "Tantrum Castle")"	3:55
Total length:		32:48

iTunes bonus track
No.	Title	Length
11.	"Love Like Woe" (Digital Dogs Radio Mix)	3:51

ShockHound bonus track
No.	Title	Length
11.	"Unender"	3:24

== Personnel ==
Credits for I'm Alive, I'm Dreaming adapted from AllMusic.

- Jordan Witzigreuter – bass, drums
- Craig Aaronson – A&R
- Jon Brown – engineering, producer
- Amy Dresser – cover illustration
- Scott Frost – A&R
- Lucia Holm – photography
- Jon Kaplan – mixing
- Emy Macek – producer
- Frank Maddocks – art direction, design
- Matthew Malpass – vocal engineer
- Dave McNair – mastering
- Kenneth Mount – engineering, producer
- Zack Odom – engineering, producer
- Donny Phillips – logo design
- J.R. Rotem – mixing, producer
- Dave Siegel – producer
- Matt Squire – producer
- Shane Stoner – producer
- Jonna Terrasi – producer
- Pete Wentz – A&R

== Charts ==
Chart performance for I'm Alive, I'm Dreaming
Chart (2010)	Peak position
US Heatseekers Albums (Billboard)	3
US Top Current Albums (Billboard)	172

== Release history ==
Release dates and formats for I'm Alive, I'm Dreaming
Region	Date	Format	Label	Ref.
Various	June 14, 2010	Digital download	Sire	
United States	June 15, 2010	CD	Decaydance; Sire	
Canada	June 15, 2010	CD	Decaydance; Sire	
