= Feel Good Now EP =

Feel Good Now

EP by The Ready Set
- Released: October 7, 2011
- Studio: Catalina Sound (Pasadena, CA); Indie-Pop Sweat Shop; Zen Seven Studios (Woodland Hills, CA)
- Genre: Electropop; pop
- Length: 15:46 (Digital Edition); 22:31 (CD Edition)
- Label: Sire Records

The Ready Set chronology
Regifted (2010)	Feel Good Now (2011)	I'll Be Waiting (2013)

Singles from Feel Good Now
- 1. "Young Forever" Released: March 1, 2011; 2. "Hollywood Dream" Released: August 19, 2011; 3. "Killer" Released: September 27, 2011

Feel Good Now is an EP by American electropop singer-songwriter The Ready Set. It was released on October 7, 2011, following the release of his major label debut and third studio album I'm Alive, I'm Dreaming. The EP includes three singles, "Young Forever", "Hollywood Dream" and "Killer". The EP debuted at number 179 on the Billboard 200.

== Background and release ==
In early 2011, The Ready Set began working on a new EP having already written 20 new songs and hoped for a release in the summer of that year. He also released the EP's lead single, "Young Forever" in March 2011, to promote his upcoming EP. Additionally, he previewed the song "Operator" in April, which was included on the digital release for "Young Forever", and later appears on the physical edition of the EP. In July 2011, Jordan Witzigreuter confirmed that the EP would be released sometime in the fall.

On August 24, 2011, The Ready Set launched pre-ordering for the EP with a release date for October 11. The digital edition contains five tracks, "Hollywood Dream", "Killer", "Back To Back", "A Little More" and "Notions", while the physical edition includes two bonus tracks, "Operator" and "Young Forever". The EP was officially released on October 7, for digital download.

In support of the EP's release, the Ready Set held a release party in Los Angeles on October 11, 2011. He also joined All Time Low on a fall tour from October to November 2011, along with He Is We and Paradise Fears. In December, the Ready Set performed a few acoustic holiday shows with Breathe Electric, Plug in Stereo, and Weatherstar.

== Composition ==
In an interview with Seventeen magazine, the Ready Set explained the meaning behind the songs. He wrote many of the songs about love, such as "Back to Back", about loving somebody who treats you terribly but still find small redeeming factors that "keeps you running right back for more," despite how bad things are. On "A Little More", the song is about Witzigreuter maintaining relationships with people while on tour and his apology from him "being so distant from someone I love." "Notions" was written about meeting somebody at the exact moment you are in and making a good time out of it. He makes references about music making you want to fall in love as well, believing that "the right song at the right time and place can change the way you see things a lot."

== Singles ==
"Young Forever" was released on March 1, 2011, as the first single from the EP. The song peaked at number 39 on the Billboard Mainstream Top 40 chart and number five on the Bubbling Under Hot 100 chart. "Hollywood Dream" was released on August 19, 2011, as the second single from the EP. He described the single as, "a story about being a kid from a small town with a simple life, who falls in love with a famous, Beverly Hills-style girl." An animated music video was released on September 20, 2011. On September 27, "Killer" was released as the third single. He explained the song as, "knowing you are not the type of person somebody should be in a relationship with, and sort of warning them to stay away."

Days prior to the release of Feel Good Now, two more songs were streamed as promotional singles, "Back to Back" on September 30, and "A Little More" on October 5, both via Facebook.

== Critical reception ==
Professional ratings
Review scores
Source	Rating
AllMusic	3.5/5 stars
Alternative Press	3.5/5 stars

Feel Good Now was given a 3.5 star rating by AllMusic, and in its review by Tim Sendra, he calls it an "even more assured-sounding, extremely well-crafted pop." However he criticized the EP stating, "The only downside of the record, and the band itself, is that they are hard to slot into any one style -- too pop for emo, too emo for pop -- and this may affect their sales." Evan Lucy of Alternative Press was critical of the EP stating, "there's not much diversity, something a sound like Witzigreuter's sorely needs."

== Track listing ==
Digital edition
No.	Title	Writer(s)	Length
1.	"Hollywood Dream"	Jordan Witzigreuter; Ian Kirkpatrick	2:52
2.	"Killer"	Witzigreuter; Kirkpatrick	3:03
3.	"Back To Back"	Witzigreuter; Kirkpatrick	3:26
4.	"A Little More"	Witzigreuter; Kirkpatrick	2:53
5.	"Notions"	Wizigreuter; Kirkpatrick	3:36
Total length:			15:46

CD edition
No.	Title	Writer(s)	Length
1.	"Hollywood Dream"	Jordan Witzigreuter; Ian Kirkpatrick	2:52
2.	"Killer"	Witzigreuter; Kirkpatrick	3:03
3.	"Back To Back"	Witzigreuter; Kirkpatrick	3:26
4.	"A Little More"	Witzigreuter; Kirkpatrick	2:53
5.	"Young Forever"	Wizigreuter; Kara DioGuardi; Niles Hollowell-Dhar	3:24
6.	"Operator"	Wizigreuter; Kirkpatrick; Tim Pagnotta	3:20
7.	"Notions"	Wizigreuter; Kirkpatrick	3:36
Total length:			22:31

== Personnel ==
Credits for Feel Good Now adapted from AllMusic.

- Jordan Witzigreuter – composer
- Kate Cafaro – publicity
- The Cataracs – producer
- David Conway – management
- Kara DioGuardi – composer
- Greg Federspiel – A&R
- Jeff Fenster – A&R
- Scott Frost – product manager
- Matt Galle – booking
- Brian Gardner – mastering
- Dirk Hemsath – management
- Niles Hollowell-Dhar – composer, engineer
- Ian Kirkpatrick – composer, mixing, producer
- TJ Landig – marketing
- Ari Levine – mixing
- Liz Lewis – marketing, video
- Mike Marquis – booking
- Laura Mende – marketing, video
- Tim Pagnotta – composer, engineer, producer, vocal producer
- Evan Perigo – photography
- Justin Smith – mastering
- Alex Tenta – design, layout
- Jonna Terrasi – A&R
- Pete Wentz – A&R

== Charts ==
Chart performance for Feel Good Now
Chart (2011)	Peak position
US Billboard 200	179

== Release history ==
Release dates and formats for Feel Good Now
Region	Date	Format	Label	Ref.
Various	October 7, 2011	Digital download	Sire	
Various	October 11, 2011	CD	Sire	
