= Lloro Por Ti =

Single by Enrique Iglesias Remix featuring Wisin & Yandel

from the album Enrique Iglesias: 95/08 Éxitos
- Released: 17 July 2008
- Recorded: 2007
- Genre: Latin pop
- Length: 4:01 (album version); 4:36 (remix featuring Wisin & Yandel)
- Label: Universal Music Latino
- Songwriters: Enrique Iglesias; Descemer Bueno; Juan Luis Morena; Llandel Veguilla (Remix version only)
- Producers: Enrique Iglesias; Carlos Paucar; Nesty "La Mente Maestra"; "El Profesor" Gómez Victor "El Nasi" (remix featuring Wisin & Yandel)

Enrique Iglesias singles chronology
| "Can You Hear Me" (2008) | "Lloro Por Ti" (2008) | "Away" (2008) |

Music video
- "Lloro Por Ti" on YouTube "Lloro Por Ti" (Remix) on YouTube

"Lloro Por Ti" (English: I Cry for You) is the second single released by Enrique Iglesias from his compilation album Enrique Iglesias: 95/08 Éxitos. The song was released as an official single in July 2008.

Enrique Iglesias performed "Lloro Por Ti" on 17 July 2008 on the Premios Juventud along with Aventura.

As of 2010, "Lloro Por Ti" has sold around 700,000 digital downloads worldwide, making it one of Iglesias' best selling Spanish songs.

== Music video ==
The music video premiered on 30 June 2008 on Ritmoson Latino and can be seen on Iglesias official Vevo channel on YouTube.

== Remix version ==
The official remix of "Lloro Por Ti" features Puerto Rican duo Wisin & Yandel. The video of the remix was shot in Los Angeles, and premiered on MTV Tr3́s.

== Chart performance ==
After being in the top 10 on the Hot Latin Tracks chart for nearly two months, "Lloro Por Ti" hit number one on 8 November. It further remained on the top for 2 weeks; "Lloro Por Ti" is Iglesias' twentieth number-one hits on the chart.

== Charts ==
| Chart (2008) | Peak position |
|---|---|
| U.S. Billboard Hot 100 | 91 |
| U.S. Billboard Latin Songs | 1 |
| U.S. Billboard Latin Pop Songs | 2 |
| Chart (2009–2010) | Peak position |
| Venezuelan Singles Chart | 1 |
| Venezuelan Latin Chart | 1 |

| Decade end chart (2000–2009) | Position |
|---|---|
| Hot Latin Song of the Decade | 13 |
| Hot Latin Pop Song of the Decade | 5 |

== See also ==
- List of number-one Billboard Hot Latin Songs of 2008
