= Love to See You Cry =

2002 single by Enrique Iglesias

Single by Enrique Iglesias

from the album Escape
- Released: 3 June 2002
- Length: 4:07
- Label: Interscope
- Songwriters: Enrique Iglesias; Paul Barry; Steve Torch; Mark Taylor
- Producer: Mark Taylor

Enrique Iglesias singles chronology
"Don't Turn Off the Lights" (2002)	"Love to See You Cry" (2002)	"Maybe" (2002)

Music video
- "Love to See You Cry" on YouTube

"Love to See You Cry" is the fourth single released from Spanish singer-songwriter Enrique Iglesias' second English-language studio album, Escape. The song was written by Iglesias, Mark Taylor, Paul Barry and Steve Torch, and it was produced by Taylor.

The single was released on 3 June 2002 in Europe and peaked at number 12 on the UK Singles Chart. Worldwide, the song reached number one in the Czech Republic and peaked inside the top 20 in Canada, France, Greece, Ireland, Portugal, Romania, and Spain. The music video features Mexican model Elsa Benitez playing opposite Iglesias.

== Track listings ==
Spanish CD single

1. "Love to See You Cry" (album version) – 4:05
2. "Love to See You Cry" (Pippi & Chus Mediterranean vocal mix) – 9:03
3. "Love to See You Cry" (Pippi & Chus Mediterranean dub mix) – 7:14
4. "Love to See You Cry" (Pippi & Chus Mediterranean radio edit) – 4:18

European CD single

1. "Love to See You Cry" (album version) – 4:05
2. "Escape" (Giorgio Moroder and Fernando Garibay radio mix) – 4:04

UK CD1

1. "Love to See You Cry" (album version) – 4:05
2. "Sad Eyes" (album version) – 4:08
3. "Love to See You Cry" (Metro mix) – 6:19
4. "Love to See You Cry" (CD-ROM video)

UK CD2

1. "Love to See You Cry" (album version) – 4:05
2. "Experiencia Religiosa" (album version) – 5:28
3. "Only You" (video)

UK cassette single

1. "Love to See You Cry" (album version) – 4:05
2. "Sad Eyes" (album version) – 4:08

Australian CD single

1. "Love to See You Cry" (album version) – 4:05
2. "Escape" (Giorgio Moroder and Fernando Garibay radio mix) – 4:04
3. "Escape" (7th District radio mix) – 3:21
4. "Love to See You Cry" (Metro mix) – 6:19
5. "Escape" (video) – 3:30

== Credits and personnel ==
Credits are lifted from the Escape album booklet.

Studios

- Vocals engineered at Circle House (Miami, Florida)
- Mastered at Bernie Grundman Mastering Studio (Hollywood, California)

Personnel

- Enrique Iglesias – writing, vocals
- Paul Barry – writing, background vocals
- Steve Torch – writing
- Mark Taylor – writing, electric guitar, bass, drums, percussion, production, mixing
- Sylvia Mason-James – background vocals
- Adam Phillips – acoustic guitar
- Carlos Paucar – vocal engineering
- Jong Uk Yoon – assistant engineering
- Ivy Skoff – production coordination
- Brian Gardner – mastering

== Charts ==
=== Weekly charts ===
Weekly chart performance for "Love to See You Cry"
Chart (2002–2003)	Peak position
Australia (ARIA)	61
Austria (Ö3 Austria Top 40)	55
Belgium (Ultratop 50 Flanders)	32
Belgium (Ultratop 50 Wallonia)	26
Canada (Nielsen SoundScan)	17
Czech Republic (IFPI)	1
Europe (Eurochart Hot 100)	27
France (SNEP)	17
Germany (GfK)	53
Greece (IFPI)	15
Ireland (IRMA)	12
Italy (FIMI)	30
Netherlands (Dutch Top 40)	25
Netherlands (Single Top 100)	37
New Zealand (Recorded Music NZ)	26
Portugal (AFP)	5
Romania (Romanian Top 100)	2
Scotland Singles (OCC)	14
Spain (Promusicae)	19
Switzerland (Schweizer Hitparade)	35
UK Singles (OCC)	12

=== Year-end charts ===
Year-end chart performance for "Love to See You Cry"
Chart (2002)	Position
Canada (Nielsen SoundScan)	75

== Release history ==
Release dates and formats for "Love to See You Cry"
Region	Date	Format(s)	Label(s)	Ref.
Europe	3 June 2002	CD	Interscope	
United Kingdom	26 August 2002	CD; cassette	Interscope	
Canada	3 December 2002	CD	Interscope	
Australia	7 April 2003	CD	Interscope	
