= List of Dutch Top 40 number-one singles of 2008 =

This is a list of the Dutch Top 40 number-one singles of 2008.

Issue date	Song	Artist(s)
5 January	"Apologize"	Timbaland presents OneRepublic
12 January	"Apologize"	Timbaland presents OneRepublic
19 January	"Apologize"	Timbaland presents OneRepublic
26 January	"Valerie"	Mark Ronson featuring Amy Winehouse
2 February	"Valerie"	Mark Ronson featuring Amy Winehouse
9 February	"Valerie"	Mark Ronson featuring Amy Winehouse
16 February	"Valerie"	Mark Ronson featuring Amy Winehouse
23 February	"Bleeding Love"	Leona Lewis
1 March	"Bleeding Love"	Leona Lewis
8 March	"Bleeding Love"	Leona Lewis
15 March	"Hello World"	Nikki
22 March	"Hello World"	Nikki
29 March	"Hello World"	Nikki
5 April	"Mercy"	Duffy
12 April	"Mercy"	Duffy
19 April	"Shot of a Gun"	Kane
26 April	"Shot of a Gun"	Kane
3 May	"Wit Licht"	Marco Borsato
10 May	"Wit Licht"	Marco Borsato
17 May	"Wit Licht"	Marco Borsato
24 May	"4 Minutes"	Madonna featuring Justin Timberlake & Timbaland
31 May	"4 Minutes"	Madonna featuring Justin Timberlake & Timbaland
7 June	"This Is the Life"	Amy Macdonald
14 June	"This Is the Life"	Amy Macdonald
21 June	"Viva Hollandia" (EK Versie)	Wolter Kroes
28 June	"Viva Hollandia" (EK Versie)	Wolter Kroes
5 July	"Can You Hear Me"	Enrique Iglesias
12 July	"Can You Hear Me"	Enrique Iglesias
19 July	"Give It 2 Me"	Madonna
26 July	"Give It 2 Me"	Madonna
2 August	"Give It 2 Me"	Madonna
9 August	"Give It 2 Me"	Madonna
16 August	"Give It 2 Me"	Madonna
23 August	"Give It 2 Me"	Madonna
30 August	"Stop de Tijd"	Marco Borsato
6 September	"Stop de Tijd"	Marco Borsato
13 September	"Stop de Tijd"	Marco Borsato
20 September	"I Kissed a Girl"	Katy Perry
27 September	"I Kissed a Girl"	Katy Perry
4 October	"Viva la Vida"	Coldplay
11 October	"Viva la Vida"	Coldplay
18 October	"Viva la Vida"	Coldplay
25 October	"Show Me Love 2008"	Robin S.
1 November	"Show Me Love 2008"	Robin S.
8 November	"Show Me Love 2008"	Robin S.
15 November	"Dochters"	Marco Borsato
22 November	"Dochters"	Marco Borsato
29 November	"Dochters"	Marco Borsato
6 December	"If I Were a Boy"	Beyoncé
13 December	"If I Were a Boy"	Beyoncé
20 December	"If I Were a Boy"	Beyoncé
27 December	"If I Were a Boy"	Beyoncé

== Number-one artists ==
Position	Artist	Weeks #1
1	Marco Borsato	9
2	Madonna	8
3	Timbaland	5
4	Mark Ronson	4
4	Amy Winehouse	4
3	Robbie Williams	4
3	Beyoncé	4
4	OneRepublic	3
4	Leona Lewis	3
4	Nikki	3
4	Coldplay	3
4	Robin S.	3
5	Duffy	2
5	Kane	2
5	Justin Timberlake	2
5	Amy Macdonald	2
5	Wolter Kroes	2
5	Enrique Iglesias	2
5	Katy Perry	2

== See also ==
- 2008 in music
