= My Garden =

Studio album by Kat Dahlia
- Released: January 13, 2015
- Recorded: 2011–14
- Genres: Alternative R&B; hip hop
- Length: 42:44
- Labels: Epic; Vested in Culture
- Producers: Frankie Storm; Glass John; Daniel Iyere; J. Dens; Salaam Remi; Step; Rico Love

Kat Dahlia chronology
Seeds (2013)	My Garden (2015)

Singles from My Garden
- 1. "Gangsta" Released: March 1, 2013; 2. "Crazy" Released: February 18, 2014; 3. "I Think I'm in Love" Released: February 12, 2015

My Garden is the debut studio album by American recording artist Kat Dahlia. It was released on January 13, 2015, by Epic Records, distributed by Vested in Culture. The album was supported by two singles; "Gangsta" and "Crazy", as well as the iTunes' "instant gratification" tracks; "Mirror" and "Clocks".

In January 2014, Complex listed My Garden, as the forty-sixth most anticipated album of 2014. After several delays, from being scheduled to be released in February 2014, to being rescheduled to September 2014, in October 2014, Epic Records settled in January 2015.

== Background ==
At the age of 18, after saving money from jobs as a waitress, Dahlia decided to leave Miami and moved to New York City a month later, "on a whim." Shortly thereafter, Dahlia became involved in what she describes as a "toxic relationship," which she would later come to regard as a source of inspiration and "writer's gold." After self-financing an extended play (EP) and a music video, Dahlia was discovered by Vested in Culture (VIC) Vice President of A&R, Amanda Berkowitz. Berkowitz quickly brought Dahlia to the attention of veteran record executive Sylvia Rhone. In 2012, describing Dahlia as "more than just a pop artist," Sylvia Rhone signed Dahlia to her newly launched label, VIC, a joint venture with Epic Records. Dahlia's debut album is set be VIC's inaugural release.

== Recording and production ==
In April 2013, it was announced Kat Dahlia was scheduled to collaborate with English music producer Naughty Boy, for her upcoming debut album, My Garden. In July 2013, Dahlia revealed she was working with fellow American rapper and singer-songwriter Missy Elliott, on her debut album My Garden. In addition to Elliott, Dahlia revealed further collaborations with American record producers Timothy "Timbaland" Mosley, Salaam Remi and Christopher "Tricky" Stewart.

During a May 2013 interview with Interview magazine, Dahlia expressed wanting to work with Detroit-based rapper Eminem, Fugees singer Lauryn Hill and American pop singer Madonna. In a May 2013 interview with Fuse, Dahlia spoke on her collaborations with Timbaland, Snoop Dogg and Meleni "Polly A." Smith, the latter of which contributed to Dahlia's song "Money Party".

In a June 2013 interview, Dahlia revealed she co-wrote some songs with friends, such as Tawanna "Frankie Storm" Dabney, who wrote "Don't Stop the Music" for Barbadian singer Rihanna. During the same interview, when asked about her dream collaborations, Dahlia stated: "I'd love to work with B.B. King. I would love to work with Robert Plant and Kendrick Lamar who is a great writer. Eminem is an amazing writer, Ellie Goulding, Emeli Sande, I like writers. I like people that have a message in their music. Damian Marley,..". In July 2013, Vested in Culture founder Sylvia Rhone, announced via her official Twitter account that Dahlia had entered recording sessions with Timbaland and Missy Elliott. Rhone spoke highly of the sessions, adding that it "felt like good 'ol days" and cited it as "magic".

== Release and promotion ==
In May 2013, Dahlia stated that she wanted to release the " Synematic " –produced "Fireman", as a follow-up to her debut single, "Gangsta". On July 25, 2013, Kat Dahlia performed an acoustic version of her song "Mirrors", for Perez Hilton's Perez TV. On August 8, 2013, a song titled "Clocks". was released by Epic subsidiary label Vested in Culture, exclusively via VEVO. The following month, Dahlia performed a live acoustic rendition of "Clocks", as part of Billboard's Tastemaker Sessions. On August 22, 2013, an album teaser of My Garden, was released.

In September 2013, Dahlia announced she would be releasing an extended play (EP) titled Seeds. In support of Seeds, Dahlia set out on a nine-date concert tour along the east coast. Beginning on October 8, in New York City, at Webster Hall and end on October 20, at Culture Room in Ft. Lauderdale, Florida. On November 21, 2013, Dahlia released the EP for free via digital download. The project includes six songs, including "Happy and I Know It" and "The High", which Dahlia released music videos for.

The album was at one point scheduled to be released in February 2014, and more recently moved to September 2014 by Epic Records. On October 25, 2014, it was revealed the album would finally be released on January 13, 2015. On November 19, 2014, Vested in Culture released "Money Party", featuring Polly A., as a single via iTunes.

=== Singles ===
On December 13, 2012, Sylvia Rhone, founder of Vested in Culture (VIC), premiered a song titled "Gangsta", by her newly signed artist, Kat Dahlia. On March 1, 2013, "Gangsta" was officially released via digital distribution, by Vested in Culture and Epic Records, as Dahlia's commercial debut single. The digital download also featured the songs "Mirror" and "Money Party", the latter of which features fellow American singer, Polly A. The music video for "Gangsta", directed by Samantha Lecca, was released on March 5. In May 2013, Dahlia released a Spanish-language version of "Gangsta".

On December 17, 2013, Dahlia released the album's second single, titled "Crazy", on her official website. On February 20, 2014, Dahlia premiered the music video for "Crazy", during an appearance on BET's 106 & Park. On July 28, 2014, Vested in Culture released a remix of "Crazy", featuring new production and vocals from Puerto Rican reggaeton producer and singer, Jose "Gocho" Torres.

== Critical reception ==
Professional ratings
Review scores
Source	Rating
AllMusic	3/5 stars
Billboard	3/5 stars
Exclaim!	5/10

My Garden received generally positive reviews from music critics. At Metacritic, which assigns a normalized rating out of 100 to reviews from critics, the album received an average score of 63, which indicates "generally favorable reviews", based on four reviews. Andy Kellman of Allmusic wrote, "'Gangsta,' a tough ballad about self-reliance with a twist on 50 Cent's "Wanksta," was released in early 2013 as her debut single and topped out at number 40 on Billboard's R&B/Hip-Hop chart. It made for an ideal introduction to her as an autonomous individual and throaty vocalist, but her progress stalled. Two years of delays preceded the release of her first album. Regardless of the time taken for preparation, My Garden is an assertive, fully formed debut." Writing for Exclaim!, Ryan B. Patrick described Dahlia's sound as "a bit dated" and the release "a tad obligatory" after the delay, further explaining that "though the album aims high, it runs out of steam landing in the realm of just okay." Meaghan Garvey of Billboard, gave the album three out of five stars, saying "she sings, writes and raps; she has a bit of Rihanna's swagger and the gravelly vocals of 1990s grunge. If that sounds like a lot to balance, well, sometimes it is. But if nothing else, on Dahlia's debut, My Garden, she transcends the sum of her seemingly disparate influences, proving herself to be a relatively distinct artist, even if her risks don't always pay off." Judy Cantor-Navas of Billboard praised the song "Tumbao", which adopts the chorus of Celia Cruz's "La Negra Tiene Tumbao".

== Track listing ==
Standard edition
No.	Title	Writer(s)	Producer(s)	Length
1.	"My Garden"	Katriana Huguet; Justin Anthony DeSantis	J. Dens	3:57
2.	"Gangsta"	Huguet; DeSantis	J. Dens	4:05
3.	"Crazy"	Kirby Dockery; Glass John	Glass John	3:31
4.	"Saturday Sunday"	Huguet; Tawanna "Frankie Storm" Dabney; Andrew "Broadway" Williams; Curtis Troy Austin	Young Boyz	3:20
5.	"I Think I'm In Love"	Jon Levine; Huguet; DeSantis	Levine	3:22
6.	"Tumbao"	Huguet; Adeniyi Adelekan; Heny Puro; Jon Redwine	Redwine	3:50
7.	"Mirror"	Huguet; Meleni Smith; Dabney; Williams; Jared Blake Scharff; Danny King	Williams; Scharff	4:17
8.	"Lava"	Salaam Remi; Bilal; Huguet; Smith	Salaam Remi	4:13
9.	"Walk on Water"	Huguet; Dabney; Hans Zimmer	Manny Marroquin	5:29
10.	"Clocks"	Remi; Huguet; Smith	Salaam Remi	3:04
11.	"Just Another Dude"	Huguet; Javier Garcia; Dave Julca; Johnny Julca	Julca Brothers	3:36

Best Buy bonus track
No.	Title	Writer(s)	Producer(s)	Length
12.	"Pleasin"	Huguet; Smith; DeSantis	J. Dens	3:38

== Personnel ==
Credits for My Garden adapted from Allmusic.

- Adeniyi Adelekan - composer
- Will Anspach - engineer
- Curtis "Barbosa" Austin - composer, programming
- Warren Babson - engineer
- Amanda Berkowitz - A&R
- Danny King - composer, producer, programming, keyboards
- Bilal - composer, vocals (background)
- Anita Marisa Boriboon - art direction, design
- Delbert Bowers - assistant
- Matthew Vine Burke - executive producer
- Maddox Chhim - assistant
- Stephen Coleman - string arrangements
- Gonzalo Contreras - engineer
- Kat Dahlia - primary artist
- Anthony Daniel - engineer, mixing
- Justin Anthony Desantis - composer
- Gleyder "Gee" Disla - engineer, mixing
- Kirby Dockery - composer
- Chris Galland - assistant
- Javier Garcia - composer
- Chris Gehringer - mastering
- Sergio George - composer
- Glass John - composer, keyboards, producer, programming
- Dalia Glickman - A&R
- Nicole Guzman - composer
- Kuk Harrell - vocal producer
- Katriana Sandra Huguet - composer
- Jaycen Joshua - mixing
- The Julca Brothers - arranger, bass, engineer, guitar (electric), organ, producer, programming
- David Julca - composer, guitar
- Johnny Julca - composer, mixing
- Ryan Kaul - assistant
- Daniel Iyere - composer
- Michael Klein - A&R
- Dave Kutch - mastering
- Jon Levine - bass, composer, drums, engineer, piano, producer, programming, synthesizer
- Manny Marroquin - mixing, producer
- Orchestra Bratislava - orchestra
- Fernando Osorio - composer
- Jermaine Pegues - A&R
- Heny Puro - composer
- Kevin Randolph - piano
- Rankin - photography
- Redwine - producer
- Jean-Robert Redwine - composer
- Salaam Remi - arranger, bass, composer, drums, keyboards, producer
- Jared Scharff - composer, producer
- Scott "A-Trak" - engineer
- Asdru Sierra - orchestral arrangements, string arrangements
- Meleni Smith - composer, vocals (background)
- Frankie Storm - composer
- Synematik - vocal producer
- Andrew "Broadway" Williams - producer, programming
- Andrew A. Williams - composer
- Steve Wyreman - guitar
- Young Boyz - producer
- Mansur Zafr - drum programming

== Charts ==
Chart (2015)	Peak position
US Billboard 200	54
