= Tyssem =

French singer

Tyssem is a pop-hip hop French singer and songwriter. She was born in Paris in 1984 and grew up in the south of France, around Toulouse. She later moved back to Paris to pursue her musical career.

== Biography ==
Tyssem's parents separated when she was 4 years old. Her mother died when she was 10 years old. The death profoundly marked her, and she started writing music to help her cope with the pain. She discovered a love for the great singers while spending time at her mother's discothèque.

She knew at 13 years old that she wanted to be a professional singer. Her family encouraged her to finish her studies before pursuing her dream. She tried several styles of music, joining rock and rap groups before deciding to try a solo career.

Her first album, Une Bombe à la place du Cœur, was released in January 2008 by Polydor/Universal. Her first single from the album was "Regarde."

She can be heard on the French remix of "The Way I Are" by Timbaland and on the French remix of "Takin' Back My Love" by Enrique Iglesias.

== Sources ==
- (in French) Tyssem's Official MySpace
- (in French) Tyssem at Musique.com
- (in French) Tyssem's biography at ados.fr
- (in French) Brief article on AOL Music France
