= David Siegel (musician) =

American musician

- Born: Miami, Florida
- Genres: Hip hop; rock; pop; latin; jazz fusion
- Occupations: Record producer; songwriter
- Instruments: Keyboard, bass guitar
- Years active: 2000–present

David Siegel is an American record producer and songwriter from Miami, Florida. He is best known for co-writing Enrique Iglesias' 2002 single "Escape", as well as T.I.'s octuple platinum-certified 2008 single "Whatever You Like", the latter of which remained atop the Billboard Hot 100 for seven non-consecutive weeks. He often contributed to productions by fellow record producer Jim Jonsin, and has been credited on songs by music industry acts such as Beyoncé, Kara DioGuardi, Christina Aguilera, Cathy Dennis, Shelly Peiken, and Linda Perry.

In May 2009, Siegel ranked third on Billboard's Top Ten Songwriters Chart, for the magazine's First Publishers Quarterly Edition.

== Awards ==
- 2010 – BMI Pop Award for Whatever You Like recorded by T.I.
- 2009 – BMI Urban Award for Whatever You Like recorded by T.I.
- 2005 – BMI Latin Award for Cerca de Ti/Closer To You recorded by Thalía.
- 2003 – BMI Latin Award, and BMI Pop Award for Escape recorded by Enrique Iglesias.

== Discography and song credits ==
- Krystal Poppin (2021) - Composer/Producer/Keyboards
  - "Ain't No Stoppin'"
- CNCO - CNCO (2018) - Composer/Keyboards
  - ”Estoy Enamorado De Ti”
- Lauren Mayhew - Reload the Summer (2016) - Composer
  - "Wake Up"
- Jean Caze - Amédé (2015) - Keyboards
- Arturo Sandoval - Live at Yoshi's (2015) - Keyboards
- Elliott Yamin - As Time Goes By (2015) - Composer, Keyboards
  - "Magnetic"
  - "In My Dreams"
- Miss A - Colors (2015) - Composer, Keyboards
  - "Melting"
- Kurt Elling - Passion World (2015) - Pianist
  - "Bonita Cuba"
- Mod Sun - Look Up (2014) - Composer, Keyboards
  - "Look Up"
- Pusha T (2012) – Composer, Keyboards
  - "Exodus 23:1"
- OV7 – A Tu Lado (2013) – Composer
  - "A Tu Lado"
- Paty Cantú – Corazón Bipolar (2012) – Composer
  - "Silencios Que Salvan"
  - "El Sexo Y El Amor"
- Mod Sun/The Ready Set (2011) – Composer, Producer, Keyboards
  - "All Night, Every Night"
- Mod Sun – In MOD We Trust (2011) – Composer, Producer, Keyboards
  - "Paradisity"
  - "No Girlfriend (Milyun)"
  - "Need That"
  - "Time to Celebrate"
  - "Undressing America"
- Wanessa – DNA (2011) – Composer
  - "Rescue Mission"
  - "Tonight Forever"
- Flo Rida – Only One Flo (Part 1) (2010) – Composer, Keyboards
  - "Momma"
- The Ready Set – I'm Alive, I'm Dreaming (2010) – Producer, Keyboards
  - "Limits"
  - "Upsets and Downfalls"
- Amerie – In Love & War (2009) – Composer, Keyboards
  - "Swag Back"
- Now That's What I Call Music! 31 (2009)
  - Soulja Boy Tell 'Em – "Kiss Me thru the Phone"
- Deana Martin - Memories Are Made of These (2009)
- Soulja Boy Tell 'Em – iSouljaBoyTellem (2008)
  - "Kiss Me thru the Phone"
- Now That's What I Call Music! 29 (2008)
  - T.I. – "Whatever You Like"
- T.I. – Paper Trail (2008) – Composer, Keyboards
  - "Whatever You Like"
- Arturo Sandoval - Live in Ann Harbour DVD (2007) - Pianist, Keyboards
- Raging Geisha - Insider (2005-2006) - Original pop/rock project, independent release
- The Glasses Otter - Shopping With... (2004 demo) - Bass
- Will Young - "Your Game" (2004) - Composer, Keyboards
  - "Down"
- Thalía – Thalía (2004) – Composer, Keyboards
  - "Misbehavin'"
  - "Another Girl"
  - "Cerca de Ti/Closer to You"
  - "Save the Day"
- Clay Aiken – Measure of a Man (2003) – Composer, Keyboards
  - "The Way"
  - "Measure of a Man"
- Christina Aguilera – Stripped (2002) – Composer, Keyboards
  - "Get Mine, Get Yours"
- Now That's What I Call Music! 10 (2002)
  - Enrique Iglesias – "Escape"
- Luis Fonsi – Fight the Feeling (2002) – Composer, Keyboards
  - "Tell Her Tonight"
- Marc Anthony – Mended (2002) – Composer, Keyboards
  - "I Swear"
- Celine Dion – A New Day Has Come (2002) – Composer, Keyboards
  - "Right in Front of You"
- Soluna – For All Time (2002) – Composer, Keyboards
  - "Bring It to Me"
  - "Nothing Looks Good on Me but You"
  - "For All Time"
  - "I'll Be Waiting for You"
  - "All Out of Love"
  - "He Should Be You"
- Now That's What I Call Music! 8 (2001)
  - Jessica Simpson – "A Little Bit"
- Enrique Iglesias – Escape (2001) – Composer, Keyboards
  - "Escape"
  - "Don't Turn Off the Lights"
  - "I Will Survive"
  - "Love 4 Fun"
  - "Maybe"
- Pink - Missundaztood (2001) - Keyboards
  - "Gone to California"
- Joy Enriquez – Joy Enriquez (2001) – Composer, Keyboards
  - "What Do You Want?"
  - "Uh Oh"
- Jessica Simpson – Irresistible (2001)
  - "A Little Bit"
- Ricky Martin – Sound Loaded (2000) – Composer, Keyboards
  - "One Night Man"
- Jon Secada – Better Part of Me (2000) – Composer, Keyboards
  - "You Should Be Mine"
  - "Papi"
  - "Lost Inside of You"
- Silk – Tonight (1999) – Composer, Keyboards
  - "Baby Check Your Friend"

== Touring and television appearances ==
- piano track for Olivia Rodrigo's "Driver's Licence" Brit Awards performance
- 50 Cent (Las Vegas)
- Cory Henry with Nu Deco Ensemble
- Tank and the Bangas with Nu Deco Ensemble
- Richard Bona with Nu Deco Ensemble
- Jose James with Nu Deco Ensemble
- PJ Morton with Nu Deco Ensemble
- Latin Grammys 2019 with Bad Bunny
- Wyclef Jean with Nu Deco Ensemble
- Flo Rida
- Pitbull
- The Stanley Clarke Band
- KC and the Sunshine Band
- Arturo Sandoval
- Chayanne
- SkeeTV with: Post Malone, Kehlani,

 Machine Gun Kelly, OT Genaesis Casey
 Veggies, Kyle

- The Voice
- Ellen
- The View
- Good Morning America
- The Source Awards
