= Love Like Woe =

Single by The Ready Set

from the album I'm Alive, I'm Dreaming
- Released: March 29, 2010
- Recorded: 2009
- Genre: Pop; synthpop
- Length: 3:20
- Label: Reprise; Sire; Decaydance
- Songwriters: Jordan Witzigreuter; J. R. Rotem
- Producer: J. R. Rotem

The Ready Set singles chronology
"Love Like Woe" (2010)	"More Than Alive" (2010)

Music video
- "Love Like Woe" on YouTube

"Love Like Woe" is the debut single by American singer-songwriter The Ready Set, from his major label debut album, I'm Alive, I'm Dreaming. Written alongside producer J. R. Rotem, the song peaked at number 27 on the Billboard Hot 100 and number 30 on the Canada CHR/Top 40. The music video for the song features a cameo appearance from Pete Wentz of Fall Out Boy, and was released on March 29, 2010.

== Background and release ==
"Love Like Woe" was written based on experiences Witzigreuter had seen his friends grappling with. He stated, "It's about a situation where you want to be with someone but they are tough to deal with so you are trying to salvage the relationship." The song was originally titled, "Sign of Relief". An early version of the song was sent to Pete Wentz who took one listen to the song and ended up signing him to his record label, Decaydance. In 2010, Witzigreuter worked with rap duo New Boyz and released a mash-up version of the song. The song reached number 10 on AOL Radio.

The song earned The Ready Set, MTV Push Artist of the Week in September 2010. As of October 2010, "Love Like Woe" sold 46,000 digital downloads in the US. In November 2010, the single won a BDS Certified Spin Award based on the 50,000 spins it received.

== Composition ==
The song was written by Jordan Witzigreuter and was produced by J. R. Rotem who also co-wrote the song. The track runs at 92 BPM and is in the key of B-flat major. According to Witzigreuter, the song was written in his mother's basement and that the song was never intended to be released as a single. In a separate interview in 2018, Witzigreuter revealed that he didn't plan on using the song after writing it. He also stated that he wrote the song in 20 minutes.

== Critical reception ==
Professional ratings
Review scores
Source	Rating
About.com	3.5/5 stars

"Love Like Woe" was received with positive reviews from music critics. Bill Lamb of About.com gave the single a 3.5 star rating. He called the track a "radio friendly" song with a sing-along pop melody, clever lyrical hook and simple, appealing pop melody. However, he criticized the song for its overworked electronic effects. Overall, he remarked, "it is a bit over-dressed, but you are unlikely to switch the radio station when you hear 'Love Like Woe'." Chris Ryan of MTV described the song as "infectious" and "a dance anthem."

== Accolades ==
Accolades for "Love Like Woe"
Publication	Country	Accolade	Year	Rank	Ref.
About.com	United States	Top 100 Songs of 2010	2010	70	

== Music video ==
The first music video for "Love Like Woe" was released on March 31, 2010. It has received over 30 million hits on YouTube. It takes place in the middle of the woods where Jordan and a group of people are having a party in a shack. Outside, zombies try to enter the party with little success. The music video was directed by Isaac Ravishankara. According to Witzigreuter, the video took twelve hours to film.

A second version of the music video was released in February 2011. It features Witzigreuter getting ready to impress a girl when he drives up to her mother's house. He gathers a red heart-shaped box of candy, a large bouquet, and several animals, only to find out that his interest wasn't at her mother's house that day. The video also cuts in between him singing the song and his romantic interest getting ready for the day. This version of the music video was directed by Chris Marrs Piliero.

== Track listing ==
Digital single
No.	Title	Writer(s)	Producer(s)	Length
1.	"Love Like Woe"	Jordan Witzigreuter; J. R. Rotem	J. R. Rotem	3:20
2.	"Love Like Woe" (X-Mix Chartbusters Vol. 63 Version)	Witzigreuter; Rotem; Mark "Tar Boy" Williams; Joe "Capo" Kent	J. R. Rotem	4:42
3.	"Love Like Woe" (New Boyz Mash-Up)	Witzigreuter; Rotem; Legacy; Ben J	J. R. Rotem; New Boyz	3:09

Other versions
No.	Title	Writer(s)	Producer(s)	Length
1.	"Love Like Woe" (Digital Dogs Radio Mix)	Witzigreuter; Rotem	J. R. Rotem; Digital Dog	3:51

== Charts ==
Chart performance for "Love Like Woe"
Chart (2010)	Peak position
Canada CHR/Top 40 (Billboard)	30
South Korea International (GAON)	185
US Billboard Hot 100	27
US Adult Pop Airplay (Billboard)	35
US Pop Airplay (Billboard)	15

== Certifications ==
Certifications for "Love Like Woe"
Region	Certification	Certified units/sales
United States (RIAA)	Platinum	1,000,000^{*}
^{*} Sales figures based on certification alone.

== Release history ==
Release dates and formats for "Love Like Woe"
Region	Version	Date	Format	Label	Ref.
Various	Original	March 29, 2010	Digital download	Sire/Reprise	
Australia	Original	May 18, 2010	Digital download	Sire	
United States	Original	May 25, 2010	Contemporary hit radio	Reprise	
Various	New Boyz Mash-Up	July 12, 2010	Digital download	Sire/Reprise	
Finland	Original	March 30, 2011	CD	Sire	
