= Escape (Enrique Iglesias album) =

2001 studio album by Enrique Iglesias

Studio album by Enrique Iglesias
- Released: October 30, 2001
- Recorded: February–July 2001
- Studios: Angel Studios (London, England); The Record Plant (Los Angeles, California, U.S); Circle House Studios; The Hit Factory (Critiera); South Point Recording Studios (Miami, Florida, U.S.)
- Genre: Pop
- Length: 50:09
- Languages: English; Spanish
- Label: Interscope
- Producers: Enrique Iglesias; Léster Méndez; Steve Morales; Mark Taylor

Enrique Iglesias chronology
15 Kilates Musicales (2001)	Escape (2001)	Quizás (2002)

Singles from Escape
- 1. "Hero" Released: August 6, 2001; 2. "Escape" Released: January 21, 2002; 3. "Don't Turn Off the Lights" Released: April 15, 2002; 4. "Love to See You Cry" Released: May 27, 2002; 5. "Maybe" Released: November 11, 2002

Escape is the fifth studio album and second English-language album recorded by the Spanish singer-songwriter Enrique Iglesias. The album was released by Interscope Records on October 30, 2001 (see 2001 in music). Iglesias co-wrote and co-produced the album, marking a return to a more straightforward pop sound with influences from 1980s guitar rock, and collaborated with previous hitmakers like Paul Barry and Mark Taylor, as well as Steve Morales and Kara DioGuardi. Many of the songs originated from simple title ideas.

The album received mixed reviews, with some critics praising its catchy pop style and commercial appeal, while others criticized its lack of depth and artistic originality. Commercially, Escape proved to be even more successful than its predecessor, Enrique (1999), having sold over 8 million copies worldwide. The album spawned five singles: "Hero", "Escape", "Don't Turn Off the Lights", "Love to See You Cry", and "Maybe", all of which became chart hits. In November 2002 a second edition of the album was released with two new tracks: a new version of "Maybe" and "To Love a Woman."

== Background ==
Iglesias co-wrote every song on the album and co-executive produced it with Andres Restrepo. The album marked a return to a more straightforward pop sound, in contrast to the Latin-pop style of his English-language debut. It also incorporated influences from 1980s guitar rock, reminiscent of his early Spanish-language releases. In an interview with The Belfast Telegraph, he commented: "I'm Latin and always will be but my music is not. Even when I only sang in Spanish, it was still pop."

In interviews Iglesias has said that for many of the tracks on the album he started out simply with titles that he later based the songs around. The first song to use this method was "Don't Turn Off the Lights", which in a radio interview with EXA in Mexico he claimed was originally going to be the title of the album and the first single. In August 2001, he made the decision to release the ballad "Hero" which was seen as a risk but went on to become one his biggest hits.

Many of the tracks on Escape were co-written with Paul Barry and Mark Taylor who had written his previous hits "Bailamos" and "Rhythm Divine" as well as co-writing "Be With You." Igelsias also worked with songwriters Steve Morales, David Siegel, Aaron Fishbein and Kara DioGuardi and co-wrote one track with Lester Mendez. Backing vocals for some tracks were provided by Jon Secada.

== Critical reception ==
Professional ratings
Review scores
Source	Rating
AllMusic	4/5 stars
The Courier	2/5 stars
Edmonton Journal	2.5/5 stars
Entertainment Weekly	D
Los Angeles Times	2/4 stars
Lincoln Journal Star	2/5 stars
New York Daily News	2/5 stars
USA Today	3/4 stars
The Weekender	C+
The Wichita Eagle	2/4 stars

The album received generally mixed reviews. AllMusic editor Peter Fawthrop noted that Escape "is a pop/rock album through and through, and it is also reminiscent of classic pop albums of the 1980s – short (ten original songs), sweet, and wildly catchy." PopMatters critic Charlotte Robinson noted that "unlike so many other heartthrob vehicles, Escape is refreshingly short on the sappy ballads" and concluded that the album was "pretty standard dance music with lots of clever touches, enthusiasm, and commercial potential." Billboard felt that with Escape "Iglesias permanently shakes off the media-driven notion that he's merely riding papa Julio's platinum coattails into public prominence. While Enrique is not likely to be revered as one of this generation's great vocalists, he has done a fine job of establishing himself as a distinctive, appealing stylist who knows how to sell a great tune — and Escape is filled with many great, radio-ready tunes."

Jim Farber from The New York Daily News wrote that "naturally, the new album from this dark-eyed hottie has the depth of a thimble. But there is a certain bubblegum snap to his new tunes. And at least Julio’s son delivers on the pinup part of his marketing promise [...] You would do well to ignore the album’s single, "Hero," which lives down to its title. But amid the rest, you may sift some guilty joys." The Los Angeles Times found that "Iglesias wants badly to show range and depth, but both elude him and his collaborators, who prove high on craft but low on art in these variations on ultra-current pop styles and neo new-wave beats." In a negative reviews, David Browne from Entertainment Weekly wrote: "Will Iglesias be remembered for more than his surname and ability to sing with sucked-in cheeks? Not if his second English-language album is any indication."

== Commercial performance ==
Escape debuted at number two on the US Billboard 200, Iglesias' then-highest debut on the chart, selling 267,000 copies in its first week, behind Michael Jackson's Invincible. By November 2003, it had sold 3.3 million copies in the United States. With "Hero" already at number one on the UK Singles Chart, the album also topped the UK Albums Chart, making Iglesias the only Latin artist to have a number-one album and number-one single on the UK charts simultaneously, as well as the first act of any nationality to do so in five years. Escape was the third-best-selling album of 2002 in the United Kingdom, beaten only by Robbie Williams' Escapology (2002) and Pink's Missundaztood (2001). It was also the fifth best-selling album of 2002 in Australia.

The album also performed well throughout the world, being certified quadraple-platinum in the United States, 5× in the United Kingdom, Canada and Australia, and platinum in Germany.

== Track listing ==
Escape – North American version
No.	Title	Writer(s)	Producer(s)	Length
1.	"Escape"	Enrique Iglesias; Steve Morales; Kara DioGuardi; David Siegel	Morales; Iglesias^{[a]}; DioGuardi^{[b]}	3:28
2.	"Don't Turn Off the Lights"	Iglesias; Morales; DioGuardi; Siegel	Morales; Iglesias^{[a]}; DioGuardi^{[b]}	3:48
3.	"Love to See You Cry"	Iglesias; Paul Barry; Steve Torch; Mark Taylor	Taylor	4:08
4.	"Hero"	Iglesias; Barry; Taylor	Taylor	4:24
5.	"I Will Survive"	Iglesias; Morales; DioGuardi; Siegel; Aaron Fishbein	Morales; Iglesias^{[a]}; DioGuardi^{[b]}	3:43
6.	"Love 4 Fun"	Iglesias; Morales; DioGuardi; Siegel; Fishbein	Morales; Iglesias^{[a]}; DioGuardi^{[b]}	3:16
7.	"Maybe"	Iglesias; Morales; DioGuardi; Siegel	Morales; Iglesias^{[a]}; DioGuardi^{[b]}	3:14
8.	"One Night Stand"	Iglesias; Barry; Taylor	Taylor	4:11
9.	"She Be the One"	Iglesias; Barry; Taylor	Taylor	3:36
10.	"If the World Crashes Down"	Iglesias; Lester Mendez	Iglesias; Mendez	4:45
11.	"Escapar" (Spanish version of "Escape")	Iglesias; Morales; DioGuardi; Siegel	Morales; Iglesias^{[a]}; Carlos Paucar^{[b]}	3:28
12.	"No Apagues la Luz" (Spanish version of "Don't Turn Off the Lights")	Iglesias; Morales; DioGuardi; Siegel	Morales; Iglesias^{[a]}; Carlos Paucar^{[b]}	3:48
13.	"Héroe" (Spanish version of "Hero")	Iglesias; Barry; Taylor	Taylor	4:26

Escape – Japanese version (bonus tracks)
No.	Title	Writer(s)	Producer(s)	Length
14.	"Hero" (Metro mix)	Iglesias; Barry; Taylor	Taylor	4:19
15.	"Hero" (Thunderpuss radio edit)	Iglesias; Barry; Taylor	Taylor	3:18

Escape – European version (bonus track)
No.	Title	Writer(s)	Producer(s)	Length
14.	"Hero" (Metro mix)	Iglesias; Barry; Taylor	Taylor	4:19

Escape – European second version (bonus tracks)
No.	Title	Writer(s)	Producer(s)	Length
14.	"Hero" (Metro mix)	Iglesias; Barry; Taylor	Taylor	4:19
15.	"Love to See You Cry" ("Tes larmes sont mes baisers") (French version of "Love to See You Cry")	Iglesias; Paul Barry; Torch; Mark Taylor	Taylor	4:05

Escape – European 2002 re-issue version (bonus tracks)
No.	Title	Writer(s)	Producer(s)	Length
14.	"Hero" (Metro mix)	Iglesias; Barry; Taylor	Taylor	4:17
15.	"Maybe" (Mark Taylor mix)	Iglesias; Morales; DioGuardi; Siegel	Taylor; Iglesias^{[b]}; Morales^{[b]}; DioGuardi^{[b]}	3:10
16.	"To Love a Woman" (Lionel Richie featuring Enrique Iglesias)	Iglesias; Lionel Richie; Barry	Taylor; Ric Wake^{[a]}; Richie Jones^{[c]}	3:53

Notes

- ^{^[a]} signifies a co-producer
- ^{^[b]} signifies a vocal producer
- ^{^[c]} signifies an additional producer

== Charts ==
=== Weekly charts ===
Weekly chart performance for Escape
Chart (2001–2002)	Peak position
Australian Albums (ARIA)	1
Austrian Albums (Ö3 Austria)	6
Belgian Albums (Ultratop Flanders)	6
Belgian Albums (Ultratop Wallonia)	19
Canadian Albums (Billboard)	1
Czech Albums (ČNS IFPI)	37
Danish Albums (Hitlisten)	18
Dutch Albums (Album Top 100)	5
European Top 100 Albums (Music & Media)	4
French Albums (SNEP)	19
German Albums (Offizielle Top 100)	3
Hungarian Albums (MAHASZ)	23
Irish Albums (IRMA)	1
Italian Albums (FIMI)	18
Japanese Albums (Oricon)	36
Mexican Albums (Top 100 Mexico)	1
New Zealand Albums (RMNZ)	6
Norwegian Albums (VG-lista)	10
Polish Albums (ZPAV)	6
Scottish Albums (Official Charts)	1
Spanish Albums (PROMUSICAE)	3
Swedish Albums (Sverigetopplistan)	11
Swiss Albums (Schweizer Hitparade)	4
UK Albums (Official Charts)	1
US Billboard 200	2

=== Year-end charts ===
2001 year-end chart performance for Escape
Chart (2001)	Position
Canadian Albums (Nielsen SoundScan)	14
German Albums (Offizielle Top 100)	98
Swiss Albums (Schweizer Hitparade)	38
US Billboard 200	186
Worldwide Albums (IFPI)	17

2002 year-end chart performance for Escape
Chart (2002)	Position
Australian Albums (ARIA)	5
Austrian Albums (Ö3 Austria)	18
Belgian Albums (Ultratop Flanders)	25
Canadian Albums (Nielsen SoundScan)	13
Dutch Albums (Album Top 100)	14
European Albums (Music & Media)	9
German Albums (Offizielle Top 100)	18
Irish Albums (IRMA)	9
New Zealand Albums (RMNZ)	12
Swiss Albums (Schweizer Hitparade)	25
UK Albums (OCC)	3
US Billboard 200	17
Worldwide Albums (IFPI)	23

2003 year-end chart performance for Escape
Chart (2003)	Position
Dutch Albums (Album Top 100)	55
UK Albums (OCC)	98

=== Decade-end charts ===
Decade-end chart performance for Escape
Chart (2000–2009)	Position
Australian Albums (ARIA)	54

== Certifications ==
Certifications for Escape
Region	Certification	Certified units/sales
Argentina (CAPIF)	Platinum	40,000^{^}
Australia (ARIA)	5× Platinum	350,000^{^}
Austria (IFPI Austria)	Gold	20,000^{*}
Belgium (BRMA)	Gold	25,000^{*}
Canada (Music Canada)	5× Platinum	500,000^{^}
Central America (CFC)	Gold	
Denmark (IFPI Danmark)	Gold	25,000^{^}
Germany (BVMI)	Platinum	300,000^{^}
Greece (IFPI Greece)	Gold	15,000^{^}
Mexico (AMPROFON)	Gold	75,000^{^}
Netherlands (NVPI)	Platinum	80,000^{^}
New Zealand (RMNZ)	Platinum	15,000^{^}
Norway (IFPI Norway)	Gold	25,000^{*}
Poland (ZPAV)	Gold	35,000^{*}
South Africa (RISA)	Gold	25,000^{*}
South Korea (RIAK)	—	10,356
Spain (Promusicae)	Platinum	100,000^{^}
Sweden (GLF)	Gold	40,000^{^}
Switzerland (IFPI Switzerland)	2× Platinum	80,000^{^}
United Kingdom (BPI)	5× Platinum	1,500,000^{‡}
United States (RIAA)	4× Platinum	3,500,000
Summaries
Europe (IFPI)	2× Platinum	2,000,000^{*}
Worldwide	—	8,000,000
^{*} Sales figures based on certification alone.^{^} Shipments figures based on certification alone.^{‡} Sales+streaming figures based on certification alone.
