= K'Lee =

New Zealand singer (born 1984)

- Birth name: Kaleena Renae McNabb
- Born: 1984 (age 40–41) Rotorua
- Origin: Auckland, New Zealand
- Genres: Pop, R&B
- Occupation(s): Singer, Radio Host
- Years active: 2001–2003, 2011-present
- Labels: Universal Music New Zealand

Kaleena Renae McNabb (born 1984), better known by her stage name K'Lee, is a New Zealand pop singer who released her first single in 2001 at the age of 16, while still attending Waitakere College in West Auckland.

== Music career ==
K'Lee released her debut single in May, 2001, "Broken Wings" which was a cover of Mr. Mister's song of the same name and peaked at No.2 on the New Zealand Singles Chart. She followed this up in October with second single "1+1+1, It Ain't Two", a song about being insulted by her boyfriend and peaked at No.12. Her third single "Can You Feel Me?" became her best known hit to date within the country, peaking at No.2 and spending 7 weeks in the Top 10.

Her debut self-titled album was released in May 2002, and debuted at No.7 on the New Zealand Albums Chart, peaking at No.4 a week later. The album spent seven weeks in the albums chart and went on to sell 7,000 copies throughout New Zealand.

The final single from the album, "A Lifetime Left To Wait", was released in August 2002 and peaked at No.4.

After a ten year hiatus from music, K'Lee returned in 2012 with a her brand new single, 'Tables Have Turned', on 7 June. She also announced that she would release her second studio album in late 2012 but it never came to fruition.

While she's not working, K'Lee regularly jams with musicians across venues in Auckland. In an interview in August 2013 she revealed more plans to record new material in the future with producers and writers.

== Radio career ==
She has worked for Flava FM where the DJ role was highly successful and she became one of the most popular radio Dj's from that station.

In 2011 she joined Auckland's R&B and hip hop radio station Mai FM, where she hosted for 13 years, including the breakfast show for two years before moving to the 10am- 3pm slot. In February 2024 she announced she would be leaving the show on March 1 to expand her family and focus on family life, as well as her wedding in later in 2024.

== Other Work ==
K'Lee appeared on season 2 of Celebrity Treasure Island in 2003 and was eliminated first for falling sick during initial filming of the series.

In 2012, she hosted the late night show Aotearoa Social Club, which ran from September to November on TV 2 (New Zealand).

K'Lee was a participant in series 8 of Dancing with the Stars NZ in 2019, partnering with Scott Cole. She was eliminated 6th in the competition.

== Personal life ==
K'Lee is of Scottish and Maori Decent and was born in Rotorua.

She shares two children with former partner DJ Enrique Vasquez. Whilst living in Los Angeles, she found herself in the middle of a gang turf war. The house she shared with then partner and a visiting musician connected to the Crips gang was sprayed with bullets by the rival Bloods. K'Lee was sleeping on a mattress on the floor at the time of the terrifying experience.

Months later, she was kidnapped while hiking near Highland Park with a girlfriend. She had a gun pointed into the back of her head but speaking with the kidnapper she was set free. She testified against her assailant in court and he went to prison.

She is now in a relationship with Lama Saga who is a Health promoter and they have 3 kids together.

== Discography ==
=== Albums ===
Year	Title	Details	Peak chart positions
Year	Title	Details	NZ
2002	K'Lee	Released: April 2002; Label: Universal Music New Zealand	4
"—" denotes a recording that did not chart or was not released in that territory.

=== Singles ===
Year	Title	Peak chart positions	Album
Year	Title	NZ	Album
2001	"Broken Wings"	2	K'Lee
2001	"1+1+1 (It Ain't Two)"	12	K'Lee
2002	"Can You Feel Me"	2	K'Lee
2002	"A Lifetime Left To Wait"	4	K'Lee
2005	"Lock ‘N’ Load" (released as King Kapisi feat. K'Lee)	—	Non-album single
2012	"Tables Have Turned"	—	Non-album single
"—" denotes a recording that did not chart or was not released in that territory.
