= The Oakland Post (Michigan) =

Weekly newspaper

- Type: Weekly newspaper
- Owner(s): Oakland Sail, Inc.
- Publisher: Oakland University
- Editor: Autumn Okuszka
- Headquarters: Rochester, Michigan
- Circulation: 5,000
- Price: Free
- Website: oaklandpostonline.com

The Oakland Post is a weekly newspaper published in Oakland County, Michigan. It is a student-run, independent newspaper serving Oakland University. It is owned by the Oakland Sail, Inc.

== Distribution ==
Five thousand copies of The Oakland Post are distributed free of charge every Wednesday to locations on campus at Oakland University and select local off-campus locations. The Oakland Post switches to monthly production during the summer months of May, June and July because of low traffic to the commuter-driven campus.

In 2013, former editor-in-chief Seguin started converting the newspaper to a web-first paper with daily multimedia content and content management software.

== Sections ==
The Oakland Post consists of five sections. The "Campus" section covers campus issues and events. The "Sports" section provides coverage of Oakland athletics and professional sports. The "Features" section consists of local profiles and articles on campus life. The "Arts" section includes discussion of visual arts, film, literature, music and theater. The Oakland Post also includes an opinion section.

== Honors and awards ==
The paper was ranked second in its region and division by the Society of Professional Journalists in 2009. It was an Associated Collegiate Press national newspaper Pacemaker finalist. The 2010–11 staff garnered an ACP Best of Show award the 2010 National College Media Convention. The 2011–12 staff garnered the newspaper's second ACP Pacemaker nomination. It was also awarded 10th place ACP Best of Show for its website at the 2012 National College Media Convention in Chicago. In 2013, the newspaper was awarded 10th place ACP Best of Show for website design and 9th place ACP Best of Show for overall newspaper design at the 2013 National College Media Convention in San Francisco.

In 2014, The Oakland Post received ninth place in the country in the College Media Association's "Best in Show" awards for its "special edition" issue surrounding the search for OU's next president. The paper also picked up a 2014 Pinnacle College Media Award for a two-page spread on autism, designed by Frank Lepkowski.

In 2015, The Post was recognized by the Detroit Society of Professional Journalists, receiving third place in cover design for non-daily papers, and third place in editorial writing for an article written by editor-in-chief Oona Goodin-Smith, investigating the school's secretive search for a president. Goodin-Smith and Managing Editor Kaylee Kean also picked up first place and fourth place, respectively, in the Larry Laurain Excellence in Journalism Scholarship Contest.
