= Don't Turn Off the Lights =

2002 single by Enrique Iglesias

Single by Enrique Iglesias

from the album Escape
- B-side: "No apagues la luz"
- Released: 20 May 2002
- Studio: Hit Factory Criteria (Miami, Florida)
- Length: 3:47
- Label: Interscope
- Songwriters: Enrique Iglesias; Steve Morales; Kara DioGuardi; David Siegel
- Producer: Steve Morales

Enrique Iglesias singles chronology
"Escape" (2002)	"Don't Turn Off the Lights" (2002)	"Love to See You Cry" (2002)

Music video
- "Don't Turn Off the Lights" on YouTube

"Don't Turn Off the Lights" is a song by Spanish singer Enrique Iglesias from his second English-language studio album, Escape (2001). The song was written by Iglesias, Steve Morales, Kara DioGuardi, and Dave Siegel and was released as the third single from the album in the United States, Canada, Australia, and New Zealand. The song was produced by Morales, and Cuban-American singer Jon Secada provides backing vocals on the track. A Spanish-language version titled "No apagues la luz" was also recorded.

== Background ==
In interviews, Enrique Iglesias has stated that for the album Escape, he started using a different method to writing songs than he had used before. Starting off with a title or single idea he would write the song around it. "Don't Turn Off the Lights" was the first song to use this method and set the tone for many of the other songs on the album. At the time it was expected that the song would be the album's first, in an interview with Mexican radio station Exa FM, Iglesias stated that he believed the track would be the first single from his then-upcoming album.

The single was released on 20 May 2002 in the United States and on 22 July 2002 in Australia. It became a success in Australia and New Zealand, peaking inside the top 10 in both countries. It was not as successful in the United States, reaching number 10 on the Bubbling Under Hot 100. The song however did significantly push up sales of the album in the US during Iglesias's promotion. Iglesias promoted the week of Thanksgiving, performing the song on TV shows Last Call with Carson Daly, MTV's TRL, Live with Regis and Kelly and the Today Show summer concert series, where he attracted the largest crowd of Summer Concert series to date.

== Music video ==
The video for the single features footage of Iglesias performing in concert, relaxing backstage/off tour and interacting with fans.

== Track listings ==
European CD single

1. "Don't Turn Off the Lights" (album version) – 3:47
2. "Hero" (from The One and Only Show—UK) – 4:38

US CD single

1. "Don't Turn Off the Lights"
2. "No apagues la luz"

Australian maxi-CD single

1. "Don't Turn Off the Lights" (LP version) – 3:47
2. "Don't Turn Off the Lights" (Fernando Garibay & Giorgio Moroder remix) – 4:23
3. "Don't Turn Off the Lights" (Fernando Garibay & Giorgio Moroder extended mix) – 7:30
4. "Escape" (StoneBridge radio mix) – 4:32
5. "Escape" (JJ's radio edit) – 3:25
6. "Escape" (video) – 3:30
- A CD single without the video was also issued.

== Credits and personnel ==
Credits are lifted from the Escape album booklet.

Studios

- Recorded at Hit Factory Criteria (Miami, Florida)
- Mastered at Bernie Grundman Mastering Studio (Hollywood, California)

Personnel

- Enrique Iglesias – writing, vocals, background vocals, co-production, vocal production
- Steve Morales – writing, background vocals, programming, production, vocal production
- Kara DioGuardi – writing, background vocals, vocal production
- David Siegel – writing, keyboards
- Jon Secada – background vocals
- Aaron Fishbein – guitar
- Sebastian Krys – mixing
- Carlos Paucar – engineering
- Shane Stoner – engineering
- Fabian Marasciullo – assistant engineering
- Marc Lee – assistant engineering
- Ivy Skoff – production coordination
- Brian Gardner – mastering

== Charts ==
=== Weekly charts ===
Chart (2002)	Peak position
Australia (ARIA)	8
Netherlands (Single Top 100)	89
New Zealand (Recorded Music NZ)	6
Romania (Romanian Top 100)	18
US Bubbling Under Hot 100 (Billboard)	10
US Pop Airplay (Billboard)	24

=== Year-end charts ===
Chart (2002)	Position
Australia (ARIA)	48
Canada Radio (Nielsen BDS)	74
New Zealand (RIANZ)	46

== Certifications ==
Region	Certification	Certified units/sales
Australia (ARIA)	Gold	35,000^{^}
^{^} Shipments figures based on certification alone.

== Release history ==
Region	Date	Format(s)	Label(s)	Ref.
United States	20 May 2002	Contemporary hit radio	Interscope	
Australia	22 July 2002	Maxi-CD	Interscope	
Australia	29 July 2002	CD	Interscope	
