= Escape (Enrique Iglesias song) =

2002 single by Enrique Iglesias

Single by Enrique Iglesias

from the album Escape
- B-side: "Hero" (Thunderpuss remix)
- Released: 23 January 2002
- Studio: Hit Factory Criteria (Miami, Florida)
- Genre: Pop
- Length: 3:28
- Label: Interscope
- Songwriters: Enrique Iglesias; Steve Morales; Kara DioGuardi; David Siegel
- Producer: Steve Morales

Enrique Iglesias singles chronology
"Hero" (2001)	"Escape" (2002)	"Don't Turn Off the Lights" (2002)

Music video
- "Escape" on YouTube

"Escape" is a song written by Enrique Iglesias, Steve Morales, Kara DioGuardi, and David Siegel for Iglesias's fifth studio album, Escape (2001). The song is the album's opening track and was released as its second single. In Japan, "Escape" was released on 23 January 2002 as a double A-side with "Hero", while in the United States, it was serviced to radio five days later. The song reached number three in the UK and number 12 on the US Billboard Hot 100. A Spanish version of the song, titled "Escapar", reached number nine in Iglesias's native Spain.

== Music and lyrics ==
"Escape" composed in common time and in the key of B major, with the entire song consisting of a I–IV–vi–V chord progression loop. It is written in verse-chorus form, and its instrumentation comes from the electric guitar and keyboard. The song moves at a tempo of 126 beats per minute. Enrique Iglesias' vocals span from F♯_{4} to D♯_{6}.

== Music video ==
Iglesias and Kournikova play lovers in the music video.

The song's music video was directed by Dave Meyers and filmed in the Long Beach Performing Arts Center and the CityWalk shopping area in Universal City, California. It features Iglesias and tennis-player Anna Kournikova (whom eventually became his partner) as his love interest. The video opens with a sequence of Iglesias performing the song, backed by a live band, in front of a huge crowd in a theater. Throughout the video, there are sequences of Iglesias and Kournikova's relationship. The first sequence is of Iglesias driving through a busy city on a motorbike while Kournikova awaits his arrival. Once he arrives, he attempts to kiss her but she pushes him away.

In the next scene Iglesias follows Kournikova into the ladies room. She catches his eye in the mirror and turns around to kiss him. They continue kissing while sprawled across the bathroom sinks until two security guards pull them apart and take Iglesias away. The scene soon cuts to another scene where another security guard pulls up in a carpark and spots them kissing while lying across the front seats of a car. But, unlike the previous security guards, he leaves them undisturbed and drives away. The video closes with a scene of the theater being emptied, but Kournikova stands and waits in her seat until Iglesias comes over to her after the crowd has left.

"Escape" premiered on MTV's top-10 chart program Total Request Live on 30 January 2002, where it reached number one. It was Iglesias's first video to retire from the chart at number one. After its 8 February debut on MuchMusic's Countdown, it reached number one for the week of 19 April.

== Live performances ==
Enrique first performed the song at the NBA All-Star Read to Achieve Celebration on 9 February 2002, followed by a performance on The Late Show with David Letterman two days later. He also performed on MTV's Fashionably Loud on 19 February and on The Tonight Show with Jay Leno on 18 April 2002. He would perform the song alongside "Hero" at that year's World Music Awards, and in the UK, he would perform the song as a duet with Lulu in her An Audience with... special and solo on Michael Parkinson's talk show Parkinson.

== Track listings ==
- Spanish CD single
1. "Escapar" (album version)
2. "Escape" (album version)
- Spanish maxi-CD single
1. "Escapar" (album version)
2. "Escape" (album version)
3. "Escape" (StoneBridge radio mix)
4. "Hero" (Thunderpuss remix)
5. "Hero" (video)
- European CD single
1. "Escape" (album version)
2. "Escape" (Boogieman remix)
- UK CD1
1. "Escape" (album version) – 3:28
2. "Escape" (Thunderpuss club mix) – 9:36
3. Enrique interview footage
- UK CD2
1. "Escape" (album version) – 3:28
2. "Escape" (Giorgio Moroder & Fernando Garibay club mix) – 7:44
3. "Escape" (StoneBridge radio mix version) – 4:30
4. "Escape" (video)
- UK cassette single
1. "Escape" (album version) – 3:28
2. "Escape" (Giorgio Moroder & Fernando Garibay club mix) – 7:44
- Australian CD single
1. "Escape" (album version)
2. "Escape" (Boogieman remix)
3. "Escape" (StoneBridge radio mix)
4. "Hero" (Thunderpuss remix)
5. "Hero" (enhanced video)
- Japanese CD single – "Hero" / "Escape"
1. "Hero" (album version)
2. "Escape" (album version)
3. "Hero" (instrumental version)

== Credits and personnel ==
Credits are lifted from the Escape album booklet.

Studios

- Recorded at Hit Factory Criteria (Miami, Florida)
- Mastered at Bernie Grundman Mastering Studio (Hollywood, California)

Personnel

- Enrique Iglesias – writing, vocals, co-production, vocal production
- Steve Morales – writing, background vocals, production, vocal production
- Kara DioGuardi – writing, background vocals, vocal production
- David Siegel – writing, keyboards
- Aaron Fishbein – electric guitar
- Sebastian Krys – mixing
- Shane Stoner – engineering
- Fabian Marasciullo – engineering
- Marc Lee – assistant engineering
- Ivy Skoff – production coordination
- Brian Gardner – mastering

== Charts ==
=== Weekly charts ===
Weekly chart performance for "Escape"
Chart (2002)	Peak position
Australia (ARIA)	7
Austria (Ö3 Austria Top 40)	5
Belgium (Ultratop 50 Flanders)	5
Belgium (Ultratop 50 Wallonia)	29
Croatia International Airplay (Top lista)	6
Czech Republic (IFPI)	2
Denmark (Tracklisten)	15
Europe (Eurochart Hot 100)	7
Germany (GfK)	6
Greece (IFPI)	26
Honduras (UPI)	4
Ireland (IRMA)	2
Italy (FIMI)	24
Netherlands (Dutch Top 40)	3
Netherlands (Single Top 100)	4
New Zealand (Recorded Music NZ)	4
Norway (VG-lista)	16
Portugal (AFP)	2
Romania (Romanian Top 100)	2
Scotland Singles (OCC)	3
Sweden (Sverigetopplistan)	14
Switzerland (Schweizer Hitparade)	11
UK Singles (OCC)	3
US Billboard Hot 100	12
US Adult Contemporary (Billboard)	25
US Adult Pop Airplay (Billboard)	33
US Dance Club Songs (Billboard) Remixes	1
US Pop Airplay (Billboard)	7
US Rhythmic Airplay (Billboard)	37

Weekly chart performance for "Escapar"
Chart (2002)	Peak position
Spain (PROMUSICAE)	9
US Hot Latin Songs (Billboard)	2
US Latin Pop Airplay (Billboard)	2
US Tropical Airplay (Billboard)	5

=== Year-end charts ===
Year-end chart performance for "Escape"
Chart (2002)	Position
Australia (ARIA)	44
Austria (Ö3 Austria Top 40)	41
Belgium (Ultratop 50 Flanders)	34
Canada Radio (Nielsen BDS)	14
Europe (Eurochart Hot 100)	57
Germany (Media Control)	40
Ireland (IRMA)	20
Netherlands (Dutch Top 40)	31
Netherlands (Single Top 100)	47
New Zealand (RIANZ)	13
Sweden (Hitlistan)	87
Switzerland (Schweizer Hitparade)	71
UK Singles (OCC)	46
UK Airplay (Music Week)	46
US Billboard Hot 100	57
US Adult Top 40 (Billboard)	85
US Dance Club Play (Billboard)	1
US Mainstream Top 40 (Billboard)	40

Year-end chart performance for "Escapar"
Chart (2002)	Position
US Hot Latin Tracks (Billboard)	24
US Latin Pop Airplay (Billboard)	20

== Certifications ==
Certifications and sales for "Escape"
Region	Certification	Certified units/sales
Australia (ARIA)	Platinum	70,000^{^}
New Zealand (RMNZ)	Gold	15,000^{‡}
United Kingdom (BPI)	Gold	400,000^{‡}
^{^} Shipments figures based on certification alone.^{‡} Sales+streaming figures based on certification alone.

== Release history ==
Release dates and formats for "Escape"
Region	Version	Date	Format(s)	Label(s)	Ref.
Japan	"Hero" / "Escape"	23 January 2002	CD	Interscope	
United States	"Escape"	28 January 2002	Contemporary hit radio	Interscope	
Australia	"Escape"	4 March 2002	CD	Interscope	
United Kingdom	"Escape"	13 May 2002	CD; cassette	Interscope	

== See also ==
- List of Billboard Hot Dance Music/Club Play number ones of 2002
