= Hero (Enrique Iglesias song) =

2001 single by Enrique Iglesias

Single by Enrique Iglesias

from the album Escape
- Released: 31 August 2001
- Studio: Angel (London England); Circle House, The Hit Factory Critiera, South Point Recording (Miami, Florida); The Record Plant (Los Angeles)
- Genre: Latin pop; pop
- Length: 4:24 (album version); 4:11 (radio edit)
- Label: Interscope
- Songwriters: Enrique Iglesias; Paul Barry; Mark Taylor
- Producer: Mark Taylor

Enrique Iglesias singles chronology
"Sad Eyes" (2000)	"Hero" (2001)	"Escape" (2002)

Music video
- "Hero" on YouTube

"Hero" is a song by Spanish singer-songwriter Enrique Iglesias from his second English-language studio album Escape (2001). It was written by Iglesias, Paul Barry and Mark Taylor. Interscope Records released the song on 3 September 2001 to a positive critical and commercial reception. To the date the single has sold over eight million copies worldwide, making it one of the best selling singles of all time.

After the 11 September attacks on the World Trade Center, which took place eight days after the single was released, "Hero" was one of the few songs chosen by radio DJs in New York City to be remixed with audio from police, firefighters, civilians at Ground Zero, and politicians commenting on the attacks. Iglesias was later asked to sing the song live at America: A Tribute to Heroes; he had performed the song earlier at that year's Miss Venezuela, but due to the terrorist attacks the show was not aired on television.

The American television series Glee featured a version of the song as a mashup mixed with the Gipsy Kings' "Bamboléo". The release from the twelfth episode (called "The Spanish Teacher") in season 3 of the show is named "Bambolero/Hero". The main vocals were done by Chord Overstreet (playing the character Sam Evans). British musician Lawrey recorded a synth-pop version of the song featuring Kate Hawken and Jory Griffin.

On 4 December 2020, Latin boyband CNCO released a cover version of the song 20 years after the original.

== Background ==
"Hero" has a meaning of love and assurance with a desire to be a hero for the love of a woman. Iglesias stated that his high school days were the inspiration for the song. During a 2013 radio interview with Ryan Seacrest, he stated, "I went back to when I was 17 in high school, and this might be cheesy, but I thought about what would be the song I want to slow dance to with my prom date. When I wrote it, it felt good and ... I thought I know there is something special in this song."

Due to the song's subject matter, it was one of the few songs chosen by radio DJs in New York City to be remixed with audio from police, firefighters, civilians at Ground Zero, and politicians commenting on the attacks. Iglesias was also asked to sing the song live at the America: A Tribute to Heroes benefit concert, which took place on 21 September. His performance was broadcast from a warehouse in New York alongside Bruce Springsteen, Bon Jovi, and Sheryl Crow. The location of the warehouse was kept secret in case of further attacks. It was Iglesias's first televised performance of the song. He had performed the song earlier at that year's Miss Venezuela, but due to the terrorist attacks the show was not aired on television.

== Chart performance ==
"Hero" topped many charts in the US including the Billboard adult contemporary chart for fifteen weeks. On the latter, the song would re-enter the top ten a year later, the first song ever to do so. The song peaked at number three on the Billboard Hot 100 chart, though it is actually his most played song on the chart, outdoing prior singles "Bailamos" and "Be with You", both of which went to number one on the chart. A remixed recording also topped the Billboard Hot Dance Club Play chart in January 2002.

In January 2002, the song was released in the UK, where it debuted at number 86 before jumping 85 places to number one, where it remained for four weeks. Up to this point, Iglesias had already had two hits in the UK ("Bailamos" and "Could I Have This Kiss Forever") but was still largely unknown. "Hero" was seen as his breakthrough in the UK and it became the third best-selling single of 2002 there, whilst Escape was also the third best-selling album of the year. With sales of 836,500, "Hero" was the 17th best-selling single of the 2000s in the UK. In April 2015, it was announced that the song had sold 1 million copies in the UK.

In Australia, the song reached number one on the ARIA Chart, becoming his first number-one in that country. The song also topped the charts in Spain, Switzerland, Portugal, Romania, Ireland and Canada. This is one of Iglesias' best-selling singles and has sold 8 million copies.

== Music videos ==
The music video for "Hero" was directed by Joseph Kahn from 23–25 August 2001. It features Iglesias as an honorable criminal hunted by his enemies, while Jennifer Love Hewitt plays his love interest and Mickey Rourke plays one of the men hunting him. The video follows Iglesias and Hewitt running from their enemies in the desert. Finally, Iglesias' enemies track him down and confront him outside a church. The confrontation leads to Iglesias being floored by Rourke, before being struck with a baton. The video skips ahead where Iglesias and Hewitt are seen in the rain surrounded by police cars. Iglesias, though heavily injured, walks towards Hewitt and breaks down beside her. The video ends with Iglesias' death.

In addition to this video, a second video was made for the UK with less violence. The final shot of this video shows Iglesias' legs moving, suggesting that he's not dead. While originally made for the UK, this version has since replaced the original video on many music video stations throughout the world. It is also the version shown on Vevo and YouTube.

Portions of the video were filmed in the ghost town of Amboy, California, in the Mojave Desert and just outside Desert Hot Springs, California near Palm Springs. The historic gas station location that they filmed at, outside of Desert Hot Springs, was one of the first gas stations in the Palm Springs area.

In May 2024, Hewitt told Entertainment Tonight, "The craziest thing about that video shoot that I don’t know if people know, is that Enrique and [American singer and actress] Aaliyah were close friends. And the night that we filmed that video, was the night that she passed. And so Enrique had to film that, like all of his crying stuff in the video was filmed and he was really crying because she had passed [...] we all did a big prayer for [Aaliyah] at the end of the video."

== Awards and nominations ==
Awards and nominations for "Hero"
Year	Ceremony	Award	Result
2002	My VH1 Music Awards	Best Actor in a Video (Jennifer Love Hewitt)	Nominated
2002	My VH1 Music Awards	Is It Hot In Here, Or Is It Just My Video	Nominated
2002	The Record of the Year Award	Record of the Year	Nominated
2002	Billboard Latin Music Awards	Latin Dance Club/Play Track of the Year	Won
2002	Canadian Fannie Awards	Favourite Video	Nominated
2002	Comet Awards	Best Male Video	Won
2002	MTV Europe Music Awards	Best Song	Nominated
2002	Lo Nuestro Award	Video of the Year	Won
2002	Los Premios MTV Latinoamerica	Video of the Year	Won
2002	MTV Video Music Awards	Best Male Video	Nominated
2002	MTV Video Music Awards	Viewer's Choice	Nominated
2002	MTV Video Music Awards	MTV Latin America (North)	Nominated
2002	MTV Video Music Awards	MTV Latin America (Pacific)	Won
2003	ASCAP Pop Music Awards	Song of the Year	Won
2003	Ivor Novello Awards	Best Selling UK Single	Nominated

== Track listings ==
UK CD1

1. "Hero" (Album Version) – 4:24
2. "Hero" (Metro Mix – English Version) – 3:28
3. "Bailamos" (Album Version) – 3:37
4. "Hero" (Video) – 4:24

UK CD2 – The Remixes

1. "Hero" (Metro Mix – English Version) – 4:19
2. "Hero" (Ventura & Colombo Remix) – 3:43
3. "Hero" (Metro Mix – Spanish Version) – 4:19
4. "Hero" (Thunderpuss Radio Edit) – 3:18

DE CD single

1. "Hero" (Radio Edit) – 4:11
2. "Be With You" (Thunderpuss Radio Mix) – 3:56
3. "Hero" (Metro Mix – Spanish Version) – 4:19

Japanese CD single

1. "Hero" (Radio Edit) – 4:11
2. "Be With You" (Thunderpuss 2000 Remix) – 7:46
3. "Hero" (Metro Mix – Spanish Version) – 3:28

Japanese "Hero/Escape" maxi single

1. "Hero" (Album Version) – 4:27
2. "Escape" (Album Version) – 3:30
3. "Hero" (Instrumental Version) – 4:23

== Charts ==
=== Weekly charts ===
Weekly chart performance for "Hero"
Chart (2001–2002)	Peak position
Australia (ARIA)	1
Austria (Ö3 Austria Top 40)	3
Belgium (Ultratop 50 Flanders)	2
Belgium (Ultratop 50 Wallonia)	19
Canada (Nielsen SoundScan)	1
Denmark (Tracklisten)	5
Europe (Eurochart Hot 100)	3
France (SNEP)	43
Germany (GfK)	3
Greece (IFPI Greece)	17
Hungary (Mahasz)	5
Ireland (IRMA)	1
Italy (FIMI)	2
Netherlands (Dutch Top 40)	3
Netherlands (Single Top 100)	2
New Zealand (Recorded Music NZ)	3
Norway (VG-lista)	3
Poland (PiF PaF)	1
Portugal (AFP)	1
Romania (Romanian Top 100)	1
Scottish Singles Sales (Official Charts)	1
Spain (Promusicae)	1
Sweden (Sverigetopplistan)	3
Switzerland (Schweizer Hitparade)	1
UK Singles (Official Charts)	1
US Billboard Hot 100	3
US Adult Contemporary (Billboard)	1
US Adult Pop Airplay (Billboard)	12
US Dance Club Songs (Billboard)	1
US Hot Latin Songs (Billboard) Spanish version: "Héroe"	1
US Pop Airplay (Billboard)	2

=== Year-end charts ===
2001 year-end chart performance for "Hero"
Chart (2001)	Position
Australia (ARIA)	72
Austria (Ö3 Austria Top 40)	27
Belgium (Ultratop 50 Flanders)	50
Canada Radio (Nielsen BDS)	37
Canada (Nielsen SoundScan)	15
Europe (Eurochart Hot 100)	63
Germany (Media Control)	32
Netherlands (Dutch Top 40)	64
Netherlands (Single Top 100)	16
Romania (Romanian Top 100)	55
Spain (AFYVE)	18
Sweden (Hitlistan)	12
Switzerland (Schweizer Hitparade)	13
US Billboard Hot 100	99

2002 year-end chart performance for "Hero"
Chart (2002)	Position
Australia (ARIA)	18
Austria (Ö3 Austria Top 40)	22
Belgium (Ultratop 50 Flanders)	50
Brazil (Crowley)	78
Canada Radio (Nielsen BDS)	25
Canada (Nielsen SoundScan)	56
Canada (Nielsen SoundScan) Remixes EP	191
Europe (Eurochart Hot 100)	12
Germany (Media Control)	53
Ireland (IRMA)	2
Italy (FIMI)	39
Netherlands (Dutch Top 40)	82
Netherlands (Single Top 100)	32
New Zealand (RIANZ)	26
Switzerland (Schweizer Hitparade)	27
UK Singles (OCC)	3
UK Airplay (Music Week)	35
US Billboard Hot 100	22
US Adult Contemporary (Billboard)	1

2003 year-end chart performance for "Hero"
Chart (2003)	Position
US Adult Contemporary (Billboard)	18

=== Decade-end charts ===
Decade-end chart performance for "Hero"
Chart (2000–2009)	Position
Australia (ARIA)	45
Netherlands (Single Top 100)	28
UK Singles (OCC)	17
US Adult Contemporary (Billboard)	5

=== All-time charts ===
All-end chart performance for "Hero"
Chart	Position
Ireland (IRMA)	7

== Certifications ==
Certifications and sales for "Hero"
Region	Certification	Certified units/sales
Australia (ARIA)	2× Platinum	140,000^{^}
Austria (IFPI Austria)	Gold	20,000^{*}
Belgium (BRMA)	Gold	25,000^{*}
Denmark (IFPI Danmark)	Platinum	90,000^{‡}
Germany (BVMI)	Platinum	600,000^{‡}
Netherlands (NVPI)	Gold	40,000^{^}
New Zealand (RMNZ)	Platinum	30,000^{‡}
Norway (IFPI Norway)	Platinum	
Spain (Promusicae)	Gold	30,000^{‡}
Sweden (GLF)	Platinum	30,000^{^}
Switzerland (IFPI Switzerland)	Platinum	40,000^{^}
United Kingdom (BPI)	3× Platinum	1,800,000^{‡}
^{*} Sales figures based on certification alone.^{^} Shipments figures based on certification alone.^{‡} Sales+streaming figures based on certification alone.

== Release history ==
Release dates and formats for "Hero"
Region	Version	Date	Format(s)	Label(s)	Ref.
United States	"Hero"	31 August 2001	Rhythmic contemporary; contemporary hit radio	Interscope	
Spain	"Hero"	31 August 2001		Interscope	
Australia	"Hero"	22 October 2001	CD	Interscope	
Japan	"Hero"	24 October 2001	CD	Interscope	
Japan	"Hero" / "Escape"	23 January 2002	CD	Interscope	

== CNCO version ==
On 4 December 2020, Latin boyband CNCO released a cover version of the song 20 years after the original. The single is accompanied with a music video, in its turn being a tribute to the visual direction of the Backstreet Boys' 1999 music video "Show Me the Meaning of Being Lonely". The track "Hero" appeared on the band's cover album Déja Vu in 2021. The group also recorded a Spanish version for the deluxe edition of their album. CNCO previously worked with Iglesias on a remix of his 2017 song "Súbeme la Radio".

== Television and film soundtracks ==
"Hero" has become wildly popular due in part to the fact that it has been featured in many television shows and movies around the world. The earliest appearance of the song on an American television show was on a 2001 episode of The WB show Smallville entitled "Craving". Since then the song has been featured in such American sitcoms and reality television shows as Scrubs, Saturday Night Live: The Best of Jimmy Fallon, Glee, The X Factor, So You Think You Can Dance, Dancing with the Stars and the miniseries I Love the New Millennium. The song has also been featured in such international television shows as Hinter Gittern – Der Frauenknast and So You Think You Can Dance Canada. Numerous films also feature the song, including Hot Tub Time Machine, Premios Amigo 2001, Zoom, Lady Godiva, Drillbit Taylor, Don Quixote, and Beverly Hills Chihuahua.

Although the song has appeared in many television shows and movies, the first televised performance of the song was scheduled to be Iglesias's performance of the song at Miss Venezuela on 11 September 2001, but this performance was not televised due to the terrorist attacks on that day. The actual first televised performance of the song was when Iglesias performed the song at the America: A Tribute to Heroes concert on 21 September, ten days after the attacks.

== See also ==
- List of number-one singles of 2001 (Canada)
- List of number-one Billboard Hot Latin Tracks of 2002
- List of number-one dance singles of 2001 (U.S.)
- List of Billboard Adult Contemporary number ones of 2001 and 2002 (U.S.)
- List of number-one singles in Australia in 2002
- List of number-one singles of 2002 (Ireland)
- List of Romanian Top 100 number ones of the 2000s
- List of number-one singles from the 2000s (UK)
