= The Ready Set discography =

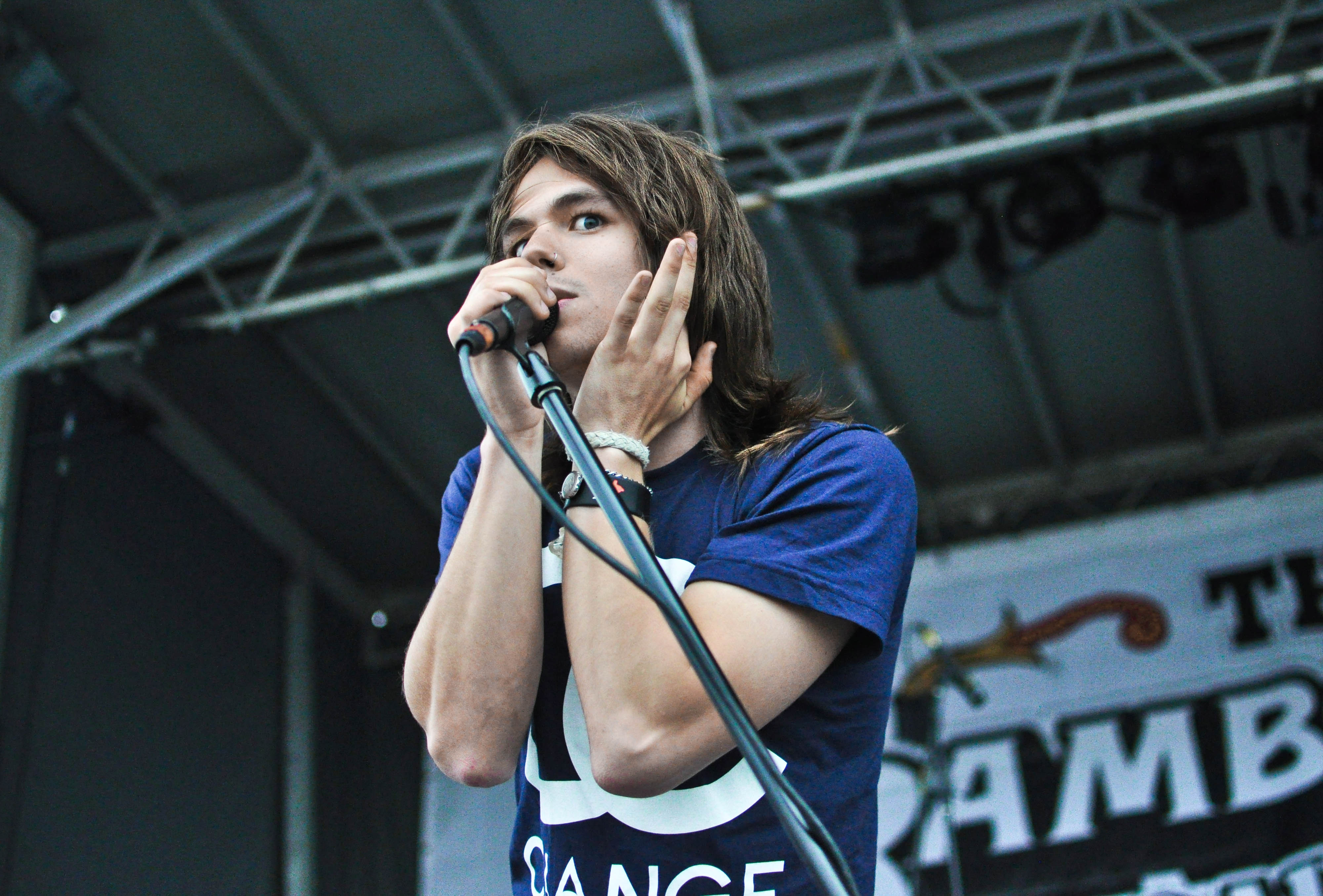
- The Ready Set live in Bamboozle Road Show 2010
- Studio albums: 6
- EPs: 10
- Singles: 17
- Music videos: 30
- Promotional singles: 12

The discography of American electropop artist The Ready Set consists of six studio albums, ten extended plays, seventeen singles, twelve promotional singles and thirty music videos. He released his first two albums, Syntax and Bright Lights and Tantrum Castle independently in 2008. His third studio album, I'm Alive, I'm Dreaming reached number three on the US Heatseekers Albums chart. The lead single, "Love Like Woe" peaked at number 27 on the Billboard Hot 100 and was certified platinum by the Recording Industry Association of America. He released his fourth extended play Feel Good Now, in October 2011 and debuted on the Billboard 200 at number 179.

The Ready Set's fourth studio album The Bad & the Better was released in May 2014, peaking at number 75 on the Billboard 200. "Give Me Your Hand (Best Song Ever)" was released as the lead single from the album and peaked at number 30 on the US Mainstream Top 40. In April 2016, The Ready Set released his fifth studio album I Will Be Nothing Without Your Love and reached the US Independent Albums chart at number 24. In 2019, Witzigreuter released music under the name of Onlychild until 2022. He released his sixth studio album Cherryland on October 27, 2023.

== Albums ==
=== Studio albums ===
List of studio albums, with selected chart positions
Title	Album details	Peak chart positions		
Title	Album details	US	US Heat	US Indie
Syntax and Bright Lights	Released: February 19, 2008; Label: Self-released; Formats: DL	—	—	—
Tantrum Castle	Released: August 19, 2008; Label: Self-released; Formats: CD, DL	—	—	—
I'm Alive, I'm Dreaming	Released: June 14, 2010; Label: Sire, Decaydance; Formats: CD, DL, streaming	— (Note: I'm Alive, I'm Dreaming did not enter the Billboard 200, but peaked at number 172 on the US Billboard Top Current Albums component chart.)	3	—
The Bad & the Better	Released: May 27, 2014; Label: Razor & Tie; Formats: CD, DL, streaming	75	—	—
I Will Be Nothing Without Your Love	Released: April 8, 2016; Label: Hopeless; Formats: CD, DL, LP, streaming	—	—	24
Cherryland	Released: October 27, 2023; Label: Self-released; Formats: DL, streaming	—	—	—
"—" denotes a recording that did not chart.

== Extended plays ==
=== The Ready Set ===
List of extended plays, with selected chart positions
Title	Album details	Peak chart positions
Title	Album details	US
Cascades	Released: April 29, 2009; Label: Self-released; Formats: CD, DL	—
Stays Four the Same	Released: June 23, 2009; Label: Self-released; Formats: CD, DL	—
Regifted	Released: November 26, 2010; Label: Sire; Formats: DL	—
Feel Good Now	Released: October 8, 2011; Label: Sire; Formats: CD, DL	179
GMYH V.2	Released: May 3, 2013; Label: Warner; Formats: DL	—
I'll Be Waiting	Released: July 24, 2013; Label: Self-released; Formats: CD, DL	—
Sorry, Sorry	Released: August 27, 2013; Label: Self-released; Formats: DL	—
The Celebrity EP	Released: May 27, 2014; Label: Razor & Tie; Formats: CD, DL	—
V1	Released: March 16, 2018; Label: Self-released; Formats: DL, streaming	—
V2	Released: August 10, 2018; Label: Self-released; Formats: DL, streaming	—
"—" denotes a recording that did not chart.

=== Onlychild ===
List of extended plays with selected details
Title	Details
Solstice	Released: July 26, 2019; Label: Self-released; Formats: DL

== Singles ==
=== The Ready Set ===
==== As lead artist ====
List of singles as lead artist, with selected chart positions and certifications, showing year released and album name
Title	Year	Peak chart positions								Sales	Certifications	Album
Title	Year	US	US Adult	US Pop	US Heat	US Dance	CAN CHR	KOR	NZ	Sales	Certifications	Album
"Love Like Woe"	2010	27	35	15	1	—	30	185	—	US: 46,000 (Note: Sales of "Love Like Woe" in the United States as of October 2010.)	RIAA: Platinum	I'm Alive, I'm Dreaming
"More Than Alive"	2010	—	—	—	—	—	—	—	—			I'm Alive, I'm Dreaming
"Young Forever"	2011	— (Note: "Young Forever" did not enter the Billboard Hot 100, but peaked at number five on the US Bubbling Under Hot 100 chart.)	—	39	—	—	—	—	—			Feel Good Now
"Hollywood Dream"	2011	—	—	—	—	—	—	—	—			Feel Good Now
"Killer"	2011	—	—	—	—	—	—	—	—			Feel Good Now
"Give Me Your Hand (Best Song Ever)"	2012	—	—	30	—	—	—	—	33			The Bad & the Better
"Higher"	2014	—	—	—	—	—	—	—	—			The Bad & the Better
"Freakin' Me Out"	2014	—	—	—	—	—	—	—	—			The Bad & the Better
"Fangz"	2014	—	—	—	—	—	—	—	—			The Bad & the Better
"Good Enough" (Original or Remix with Michael Brun)	2016	—	—	—	—	40	—	—	—			I Will Be Nothing Without Your Love
"Disappearing Act"	2016	—	—	—	—	—	—	—	—			I Will Be Nothing Without Your Love
"Life in Pink"	2018	—	—	—	—	—	—	—	—			V1
"Stitch"	2018	—	—	—	—	—	—	—	—			V2
"Who You Really Are"	2023	—	—	—	—	—	—	—	—			Cherryland
"Teammate"	2023	—	—	—	—	—	—	—	—			Cherryland
"ACT 2"	2023	—	—	—	—	—	—	—	—			Cherryland
"Loose Change"	2023	—	—	—	—	—	—	—	—			Cherryland
"—" denotes a recording that did not chart or was not released in that territory.

==== As featured artist ====
List of singles as featured artist, with selected chart positions, showing year released and album name
Title	Year	Peak chart positions	Album
Title	Year	CZE Air.	Album
"All Night, Every Night" (featuring The Ready Set) by Mod Sun	2012	—	Non-album singles
"Young Hearts" (featuring The Ready Set) by Fourth and Coast	2014	—	Non-album singles
"Forever Young" (featuring The Ready Set) by Metro Station	2014	—	Gold
"I Wanna Get Better" (featuring The Ready Set) by Against The Current	2014	—	Non-album singles
"Take You There" (featuring The Ready Set) by Kaptan	2016	—	Non-album singles
"Broken Parts" (featuring The Ready Set) by Mokita	2016	—	Non-album singles
"Paycheck" (featuring The Ready Set) by Dropout	2017	—	Non-album singles
"Lost Art" (featuring The Ready Set & Gabrielle Current) by Dastic	2017	—	Non-album singles
"Down" (featuring The Ready Set) by Streex	2017	—	Non-album singles
"On My Own" (featuring The Ready Set) by Mike Martinez	2018	—	Non-album singles
"U I Need" (featuring The Ready Set) by Aspyer	2018	—	Non-album singles
"Far Away" (featuring The Ready Set) by Nate VanDeusen	2019	—	Non-album singles
"Back to Me" (featuring The Ready Set) by KAJ	2019	—	Non-album singles
"Days Run Out" (featuring The Ready Set) by Gostan	2021	—	Non-album singles
"Too Good to Lose" (featuring The Ready Set) by Electric Polar Bears	2021	—	Non-album singles
"Touch the Sky" (featuring The Ready Set) by Yung Bae	2022	—	Groove Continental: Side A
"excuses" (featuring The Ready Set) by goth gf	2022	—	Non-album single
"Cloudy Heart" (with Electric Polar Bears & Cazzette)	2022	—	Cloudy Heart Remixes
"Already Dead" (with Daisy Grenade)	2022	—	Non-album singles
"SELFISH" (with American Teeth)	2022	—	Non-album singles
"Buttercup" (featuring The Ready Set) by Little Hurt	2022	—	Non-album singles
"The Outside (Outsiders Version)" (featuring 3OH!3, State Champs, The Ready Set and The Summer Set) by Boys Like Girls	2023	24	Non-album singles
"We Could Be the Future" (with Voila)	2024	—	Non-album singles
"POV" (featuring The Ready Set) by Scene Queen)	2024	—	Hot Singles in Your Area
"—" denotes a recording that did not chart or was not released in that territory.

==== Promotional singles ====
List of promotional singles, showing year released and album name
Title	Year	Album
"Stays Four the Same"	2009	I'm Alive, I'm Dreaming
"Blizzard of '89" (featuring Never Shout Never)	2009	Non-album promotional single
"Back to Back"	2011	Feel Good Now
"A Little More"	2011	Feel Good Now
"The Bandit"	2011	Tantrum Castle
"Paratrooper"	2011	Tantrum Castle
"Are We Happy Now?"	2013	The Bad & The Better
"Carry Me Home"	2014	The Bad & The Better
"Trash Talking Love" (featuring Kitty)	2014	Non-album promotional single
"Swim"	2016	I Will Be Nothing Without Your Love
"No Halos"	2018	V1
"Black Magic" (featuring Call Me Karizma)	2018	V2

==== Other charted songs ====
List of other charted songs, with selected chart positions, showing year released and album name
Title	Year	Peak chart positions		Album
Title	Year	US Rock Dig.	US Hol Dig.	Album
"Airplanes"	2010	22	—	Punk Goes Pop Volume 03.
"Wishlist"	2010	—	32	Regifted
"—" denotes a recording that did not chart or was not released in that territory.

=== Onlychild ===
==== Singles ====
List of singles as Onlychild, showing year released and album name
Title	Year	Album
"Phantoms"	2017	Non-album singles
"February"	2017	Non-album singles
"War & Wildflowers"	2017	Non-album singles
"Lost"	2019	Non-album singles
"Teeth"	2019	Non-album singles
"Houston St"	2019	Non-album singles
"Chardonnay & Tangerine"	2020	Non-album singles
"Thank Me Later"	2020	Non-album singles
"I Want You Back" (with Little Hurt)	2021	Non-album singles
"Sad Fantasy"	2021	Non-album singles
"Sloppy" (with American Teeth)	2021	Non-album singles
"Waste"	2021	Non-album singles

== Other appearances ==
Year	Title	Album
2010	"Airplanes" (Originally performed by B.o.B. featuring Hayley Williams of Paramore)	Punk Goes Pop Volume 03.
2010	"Drain Notes"	Take Action Vol. 9
2011	"Roll Up" (Originally performed by Wiz Khalifa)	Punk Goes Pop Volume 4
2013	"I Don't Wanna Spend Another Christmas Without You"	Punk Goes Christmas & Punk Goes Christmas: Deluxe Edition
2015	"Am I Wrong" (Originally performed by Nico & Vinz)	Non-album singles
2017	"Cotton Candy" (with Call Me Karizma)	Non-album singles
2019	"In My Feelings" (Originally performed by Drake)	Non-album singles

== Songwriting credits ==
Writing
Year	Band/ Artist	Album	Song
2022	Tiko	Wave	"Ain't Nothin' Gonna Eat Us Now"
2021	Future Coyotes	1977	"All Day All Night"
2020	Call Me Karizma	To Hell With Hollywood	"America"
2021	DREAMERS	N/A	"Brainless"
2022	Little Hurt	N/A	"Chelsea's Coming Over"
2021	Tiko	N/A	"C'mere, Santa"
2020	REYNA	N/A	"Coachella"
2021	Future Coyotes	N/A	"Coming Alive"
2017	Animal Fiction	We'll Go Places	"Could You Imagine That?"
2022	Yung Bae	Groove Continental: Side A	"Disco Body Parts"
2019	DREAMERS	LAUNCH FLY LAND	"DIZZY"
2017	Animal Fiction	We'll Go Places	"Dream Away"
2020	Paper Jackets	N/A	"Drugs & Honey"
2021	Animal Fiction	Eyes to the Sun	"Everywhere We Go"
2021	Animal Fiction	Eyes to the Sun	"Eyes to the Sun"
2021	Animal Fiction	Eyes to the Sun	"Find Our Way"
2021	Dee Swan	N/A	"FIRE"
2022	Tiko	Wave	"Fishy Got Drip"
2020	Ritzi	N/A	"Freak"
2021	Future Coyote	N/A	"Get to Work"
2021	TALKBAK	Talkbak	"Gimmie Something Good"
2020	Animal Fiction	Start Again	"Golden Age"
2020	Em Rossi	N/A	"Got This Feeling"
2020	Call Me Karizma	To Hell With Hollywood	"Heart Eyes"
2018	The Mowgli's	I Was Starting to Wonder	"I Feel Good About This"
2019	Breathe Carolina	Dead: The Album	"In The Dark"
2021	Little Hurt	Every Sound	"It's Ok Not to Be Ok"
2021	TALKBAK	Talkbak	"Jump"
2022	Chloe Lilac	N/A	"last week"
2021	Future Coyotes	1977	"Like the First Time"
2021	Twin XL	N/A	"Lonely"
2020	REYNA	N/A	"Lonely Girl"
2020	Animal Fiction	Start Again	"Magic"
2021	Tiko	N/A	"Missing You"
2021	Riivels	Riivels	"Now or Nothing"
2021	Animal Fiction	Eyes to the Sun	"Permanent Vacation"
2021	Animal Fiction	Eyes to the Sun	"Ready 2 Go"
2022	Tiko	Wave	"Real or Fake"
2020	REYNA	N/A	"Saw You With Somebody Else"
2020	Animal Fiction	Start Again	"Set Me Free"
2020	Saint Phnx	DDNM	"Sorry"
2021	Set It Off	Midnight	"So Predictable"
2022	Tiko	Wave	"Strawberry"
2022	Tiko	Wave	"Stressed Out"
2021	Animal Fiction	Eyes to the Sun	"Take Me Higher"
2022	Tiko	Wave	"The Better Side"
2020	Em Rossi	N/A	"The Other Side"
2020	Outwild	Everbright	"The Way You Are"
2021	little luna	N/A	"therapy"
2018	Lindsey Stirling	Warmer in the Winter	"Time to Fall in Love"
2020	monty.pk	N/A	"tmb"
2021	Casey Abrams	N/A	"To Me, From Me"
2020	Ritzi	N/A	"Try It!"
2017	Animal Fiction	We'll Go Places	"We Are Free"
2017	Animal Fiction	We'll Go Places	"We'll Go Places"
2020	Animal Fiction	Start Again	"We Are the Future"
2019	Call Me Karizma	N/A	"We're Just Kids"
2021	Kelli-Leigh	N/A	"You Don't Know Me"
2021	TALKBAK	Talkbak	"Yng4Evr"

== Music videos ==
Title	Year	Director(s)	Ref.
"Love Like Woe"	2010	Isaac Ravishankara	
"More Than Alive"	2010	Isaac Ravishankara	
"Love Like Woe (International Version)"	2011	Chris Marrs Piliero	
"Young Forever"	2011	Unknown	
"Hollywood Dream"	2011	Unknown	
"Killer"	2011	Jordan Witzigreuter	
"Give Me Your Hand (Best Song Ever)"	2012	Matt Alonzo	
"Higher"	2014	Unknown	
"Freakin Me Out"	2014	Unknown	
"Fangz"	2014	Unknown	
"Trash Talkin Love"	2014	Unknown	
"Good Enough"	2016	Erik Rojas	
"Disappearing Act"	2016	Megan Thompson	
"Lost"	2019	Ryan Blewett	
"Teeth"	2019	Ryan Blewett	
"Houston St."	2019	Ryan Blewett	
"Evergreen"	2019	Ryan Blewett	
"Royal Blue"	2019	Ryan Blewett	
"Crimson Red"	2019	Ryan Blewett	
"Chardonnay & Tangerine"	2020	Ryan Blewett	
"Thank Me Later"	2020	Ryan Blewett	
"I Want You Back"	2021	Ryan Blewett	
"Sad Fantasy"	2021	Ryan Blewett	
"Sloppy"	2021	Ryan Blewett	
"Waste"	2021	Ryan Blewett	
"Who You Really Are"	2023	Ryan Blewett	
"Teammate"	2023	Ryan Blewett	
"Loose Change"	2023	Ryan Blewett	
"Act 2"	2023	Ryan Blewett	
"Safety Raft"	2024	Ryan Blewett	
