= Twin XL =

American synthpop band

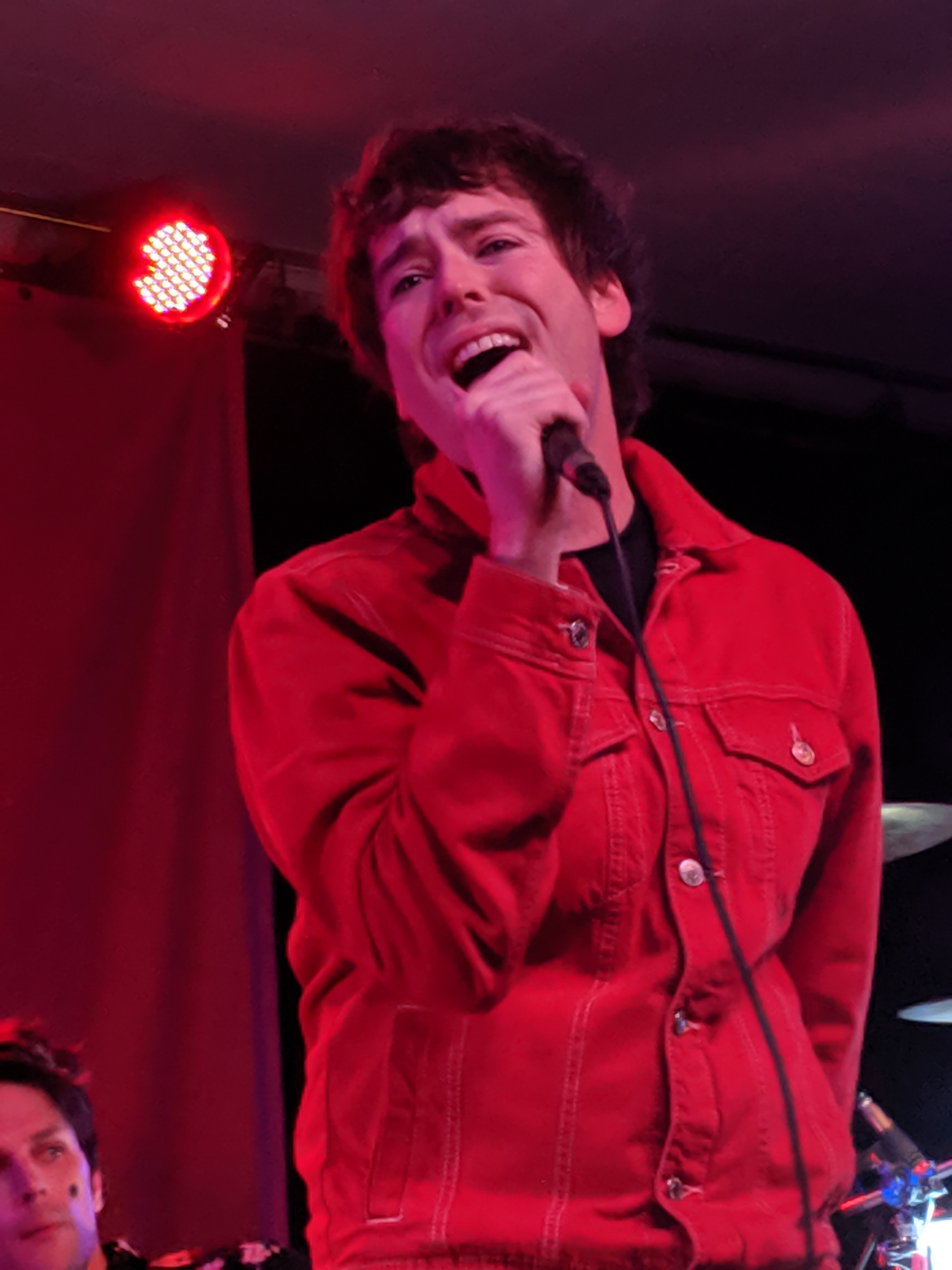
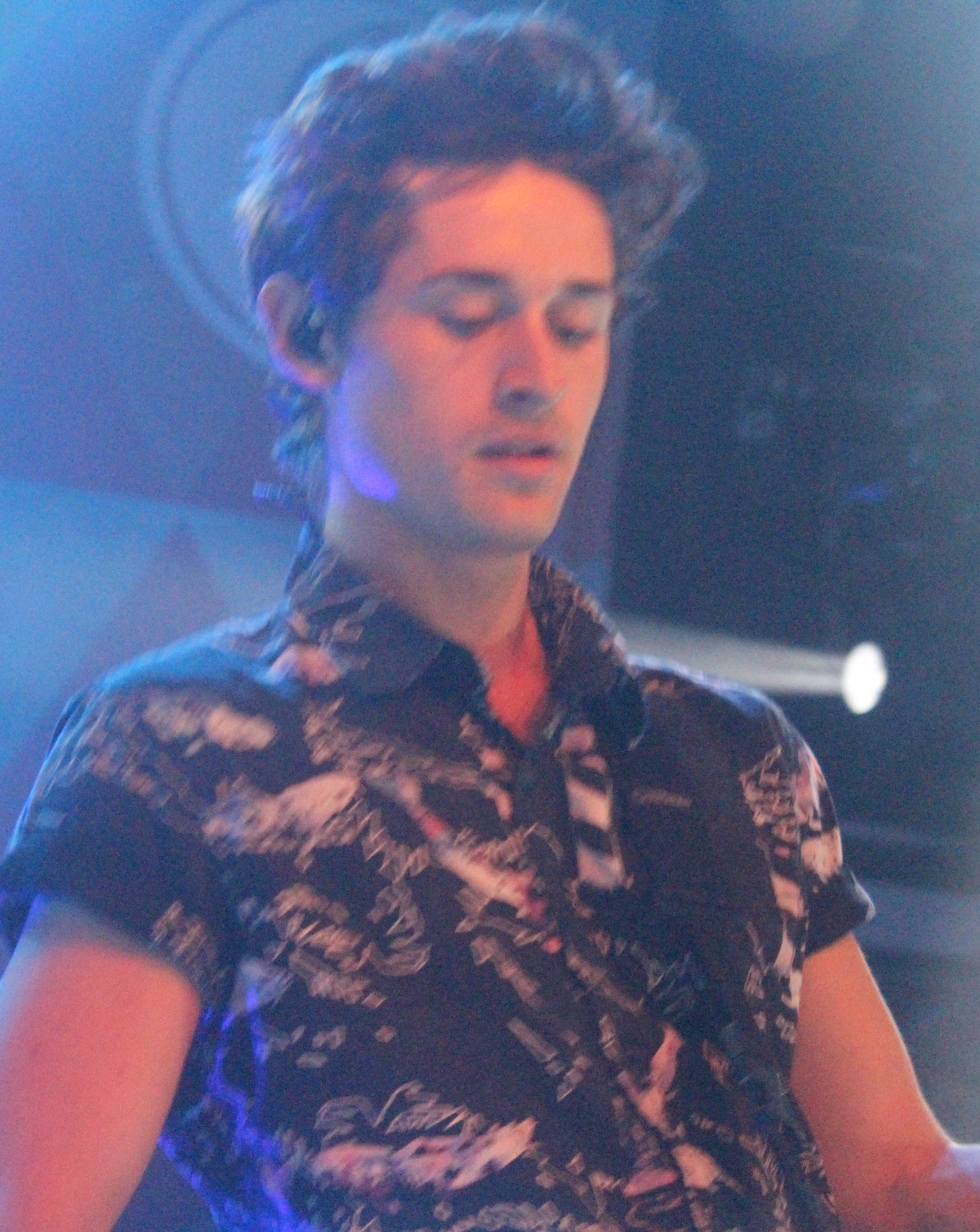
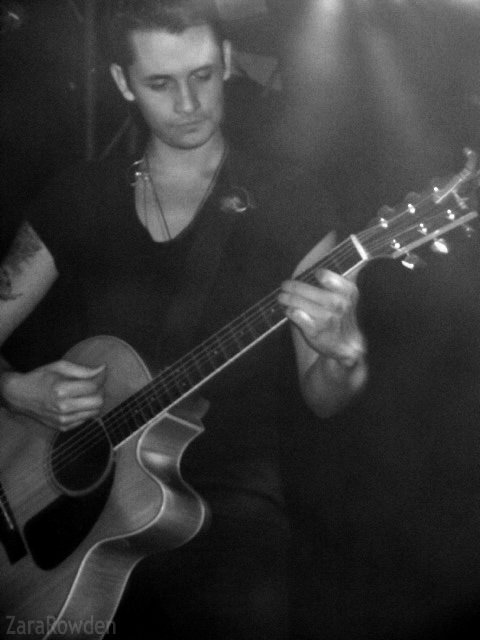
- From left to right: Cameron Walker-Wright, John Gomez and Stephen Gomez

Background information
- Origin: Los Angeles, California, United States
- Genres: Alternative pop; synth-pop; rock
- Years active: 2017–present
- Labels: Position Music; The Century Family
- Members: Cameron Walker; John Gomez; Stephen Gomez; Brennan Benko

Twin XL is an American synth-pop band and supergroup that originated in Los Angeles, California. Formed in 2017, the original members of the band consists of lead vocalist and guitarist Cameron Walker-Wright, guitarist John Gomez and bassist Stephen Gomez. The band is joined by drummer Brennan Benko who originally was a touring member until being an official member of the group in 2021. As of 2019, their music has garnered over 3 million streams.

== History ==
Twin XL originally formed in 2017 by Cameron Walker, who was a part of synth-pop band Nekokat and brothers John and Stephen Gomez who are also a part of pop rock band The Summer Set. The group met over a decade ago playing in different bands and in early 2017, they met at a LA house party and decided to try a day in the studio together thus forming the band. According to singer Cameron Walker, guitarist John Gomez had thought of the name Twin XL. Throughout their time as a group, they have opened for bands such as, iDKHOW and The Maine.

The group released their debut single "Good" in October 2018. It is the band's first song to hit the charts peaking at number 24 on the Billboard Alternative Airplay chart and number 43 on the Rock & Alternative Airplay chart. Their debut EP How to Talk to Strangers was released on March 1, 2019. Two other singles were released from the EP: "Sunglasses" and "Friends". In support of the EP, the group joined Jukebox the Ghost and the Mowgli's on a spring tour in 2019.

The group joined Fitz and the Tantrums on the "All the Feels Tour" in early 2020. After the release of their EP, they have released multiple singles and collaborated with artists such as, American Teeth and Little Hurt. Brennan Benko started off as a session and touring drummer for the band until it was later revealed on Twitter that he officially joined the group in 2021. In 2021, they released their second EP Slow Heart (Reimagined) which included the single "Slow Heart". Additionally, the group also released an online video game for the song. In 2022, the group released two singles, "Upgrade" featuring American pop rock band Dreamers and "Seasonal Depression". The band released their debut studio album, Hyperfantasia on May 19, 2023. The group also released the lead single from the album, "Animal" on April 21, 2023. The album contains previous singles such as "Problematic" and "Lemonade".

Their music has been featured in commercials and trailers for networks such as Disney and ABC.

== Musical style and influences ==
The group cites inspiration from bands such as, Foster the People, Chvrches, MGMT and The Cure. Walker-Wright stated that those bands influenced their synth and poppy sound. The group also stated that they write and produce the music themselves. Their musical style has been described as, alternative pop, indie pop, synthpop, and rock.

== Band members ==
Current members

- Cameron Walker – lead vocals, guitar (2018–present)
- John Gomez – guitar, backing vocals (2018–present)
- Stephen Gomez – bass, synthesizers (2018–present)
- Brennan Benko – drums, percussion (2021–present)

Former touring members

- Dave Briggs – drums, percussion (2018–2019)
- Kyle Rodgers – drums, percussion (2020)

== Discography ==
=== Albums ===
List of albums
Title	Details
Hyperfantasia	Released: May 19, 2023; Label: The Century Family; Format: Digital download

=== Extended plays ===
List of extended plays
Title	Details
How to Talk to Strangers	Released: March 1, 2019; Label: Position Music; Format: Digital download
Slow Heart (Reimagined)	Released: July 23, 2021; Label: The Century Family; Format: Digital download

=== Singles ===
List of singles, with selected chart positions
Single	Year	Peak chart positions		Album
Single	Year	US Alt	US Rock	Album
"Good"	2018	24	43	How to Talk to Strangers
"Sunglasses"	2018	—	—	How to Talk to Strangers
"Friends"	2019	—	—	How to Talk to Strangers
"Messy"	2019	—	—	Non-album singles
"Melt"	2020	—	—	Non-album singles
"Problematic"	2020	—	—	Hyperfantasia
"Lemonade"	2020	—	—	Hyperfantasia
"Lonely" (Featuring Little Hurt and Rad Horror)	2021	—	—	Non-album single
"Slow Heart"	2021	—	—	Slow Hearts (Reimagined)
"Upgrade" (Featuring Dreamers)	2022	—	—	Hyperfantasia
"Seasonal Depression"	2022	—	—	Hyperfantasia
"Animal"	2023	—	—	Hyperfantasia
"FBI" (Featuring Bohnes)	2023	—	—	Hyperfantasia
"—" denotes releases that did not chart

=== As featured artists ===
Single	Year	Peak chart positions		Album
Single	Year	US Alt	US Rock	Album
"Barred Out" (American Teeth featuring Twin XL)	2020	—	—	We Should Be Having Fun
"—" denotes releases that did not chart

=== Promotional singles ===
Title	Year	Album
"Neon Summer"	2019	How to Talk to Strangers

== Tours ==
=== Opening act ===
- Spring Tour (Jukebox the Ghost and the Mowgli's) (2019)
- Night Heat Tour (iDKHOW) (2019)
- The Mirror Tour (The Maine) (2019)
- All The Feels Tour (Fitz and the Tantrums) (2020)
