= Good (Twin XL song) =

Single by Twin XL

from the EP How To Talk To Strangers
- Released: October 12, 2018
- Recorded: 2018
- Genre: Pop rock
- Length: 2:49
- Label: Position Music
- Songwriters: John Gomez; Stephen Gomez; Cameron Walker-Wright
- Producer: Walker-Wright

Twin XL singles chronology
"Good" (2018)	"Sunglasses" (2018)

Music video
- "Good" on YouTube

"Good" is a song by an American synthpop band Twin XL. The song was released on October 12, 2018 as the lead single from their debut EP, How To Talk To Strangers. The song was serviced to various alternative radio stations such as SiriusXM Alt Nation, Music Choice, WLUM-FM, WLKK-FM, and KXNA-FM on April 22, 2019.

== Background and composition ==
"Good" was written by members of the band and was produced by vocalist and guitarist Cameron Walker-Wright. The song was one of the first tracks they wrote together and was written in just a few hours. The band explained what inspired the song in an interview with Nylon; "We were all collectively recovering from a long weekend full of late nights with friends, so we wanted to write a song about all of these things that we do to make us 'feel good.'" The single was originally slated for release on September 21, but due to unforeseen circumstances it was pushed back to October 12, 2018. The group released a stripped version of the song in 2019. The song has amassed over 5 million streams on Spotify.

== Critical reception ==
"Good" received positive reviews. MTV stated, "'Good' is addictively catchy, mixing a throbbing bass riff with carefully placed handclaps, whistles, and party-friendly lyrics begging to be screamed out loud." Nylon praised the song for being "very, very good."

== Music video ==
The music video for "Good" premiered in 2018. Directed by Jade Ehlers, the video showcases the band in a car ride through the desert with a mustached burglar played by Alex Nelson. Speaking about the music video, John Gomez stated, "You can try to change your environment, you can try to change your clothes, you can try to change who you’re with but ultimately you know, you can’t escape yourself." On making the video, the band was inspired by the 1998 film, Fear and Loathing in Las Vegas.

== Track listing ==
Digital download

No.	Title	Length
1.	"Good"	2:49

Acoustic version

No.	Title	Length
1.	"Good" (Stripped)	2:48

== Personnel ==
Twin XL

- Cameron Walker-Wright – lead vocals, guitar
- John Gomez – backing vocals, guitar, keyboards
- Stephen Gomez – backing vocals, bass guitar

Production

- Cameron Walker-Wright – producer
- Dale Becker – mastering

== Charts ==
Chart performance for "Good"
Chart (2019)	Peak position
US Alternative Airplay (Billboard)	24
US Rock & Alternative Airplay (Billboard)	43

== Release history ==
Release history for "Good"
Region	Version	Date	Format	Label	Ref.
Various	Original	October 12, 2018	Digital download	Position Music	
United States	Original	April 22, 2019	Alternative radio	Position Music	
Various	Stripped	August 30, 2019	Digital download	Position Music	

== Use in media ==
- Made in Chelsea
- Ex on the Beach
- The Resident
