= Passing Time =

Passing Time may refer to:

- "Passing Time", a 2022 song by Chris Brown from Breezy
- "Passing Time", a 2014 song by Heffron Drive from Happy Mistakes
- "Passing Time", a 1956 novel by Michel Butor originally published in French as "L'emploi De Temps".
