= Happy Mistakes =

- Physical edition cover

Studio album by Heffron Drive
- Released: September 9, 2014
- Recorded: 2013–2014
- Studio: Dracena Studios; Kite Music Productions; Sleepwalker Studios; TOLbooth Records (Los Angeles, CA)
- Genre: Pop rock; indie rock; electronic rock
- Length: 36:36
- Label: TOLBooth
- Producer: Toby Gad; Afshin Salmani; Steve Solomon; Denny White; Non Fiction; Kendall Schmidt; Dustin Belt; Cameron Walker-Wright

Heffron Drive chronology
| Happy Mistakes (2014) | Happy Mistakes Unplugged (2015) |

Singles from Happy Mistakes
- 1. "Parallel" Released: March 25, 2014

Happy Mistakes is the debut and only studio album by American pop rock group Heffron Drive. It was released on September 9, 2014, under Kendall Schmidt's own label TOLBooth Records. The album peaked at number 84 on the Billboard 200 and "Parallel" was released as the album's lead single.

== Background ==
Kendall Schmidt described the record as "a passion project many years in the making." Schmidt stated that the name "Happy Mistakes" came together "by a bunch of mistakes, and they ended up being happy ones." According to Schmidt, love and positivity played a major theme on the album. He stated, "I think there's a lot of negative music in the world, and if it's not negative then just pointless music. It doesn't help anybody. I don't think there's anything on Happy Mistakes that would incite anything but positive feeling, whether it's thinking about love in some way or just feeling better about yourself."

== Composition ==
The album was recorded at Dracena Studios, Kite Music Productions, Sleepwalker Studios, TOLbooth Records and Schmidt's home studio in Los Angeles, California. It was produced by Toby Gad, Afshin Salmani, Steve Solomon, Denny White, Non Fiction, Kendall Schmidt, Dustin Belt and Cameron Walker-Wright. He described the album's sound as a "mix of pop, rock and electro." He wanted the album to have at least one or two ballad songs and as he was in the process of completing it, he decided to add a couple more up-tempo songs because "it got to a point where there was a lot of mid-tempo songs." The album's lead single, "Parallel" was co-written by Gad and was written in a span of three weeks. According to Schmidt, the two spent three weeks "tweaking melodies" and changing arrangements to fit the feeling of the song. Schmidt wrote the lead track, "Happy Mistakes", "to inspire the feelings that hopefully have been conveyed through the lyrics." The track, "Love Defined" was the fastest song written from the album and was co-written by Bryce Soderberg. Schmidt described "One Track Mind", "Division of the Heart", and "Passing Time" as his "homage" to The Postal Service. "Had to Be Panama" is described as electronic, with a mix of reggae influences and was written about a girl Schmidt liked in Panama. "One Track Mind" is described as EDM.

== Release ==
On March 25, 2014, Heffron Drive released their debut single, "Parallel", which also serves as the lead single from Happy Mistakes. On July 29, the duo announced their debut studio album, as well as an international tour in support of the album. On August 4, the duo premiered the track, "One Track Mind" live. On August 12, they unveiled the cover art and revealed the album's track listing. The album artwork was created by Yvonne Bikejev, which Schmidt "loved" the egg-themed photo and used it as the cover art. On August 25, the duo released the lyrics for the songs "Division of the Heart" and "Passing Time". Happy Mistakes was officially released on September 9.

== Critical reception ==
Professional ratings
Review scores
| Source | Rating |
|---|---|
| AllMusic | 3.5/5 stars |

Matt Collar of AllMusic gave the album a positive review stating, "This is earnest, yet infectiously radio-ready music that strikes a balance between sincere acoustic folk ('Parallel'), driving electronic dance music ('Nicotine'), and anthemic pop ('Panama')."

== Track listing ==
Standard edition
| No. | Title | Writer(s) | Producer(s) | Length |
|---|---|---|---|---|
| 1. | "Happy Mistakes" | Dustin Belt, Kendall Schmidt | | 3:27 |
| 2. | "Parallel" | Toby Gad, Schmidt | Toby Gad | 3:20 |
| 3. | "Division of the Heart" | Josh Cumbee, Afshin Salmani, Schmidt | AFSHeeN | 3:30 |
| 4. | "Had to Be Panama" | Schmidt, Steve Solomon, Cameron Walker-Wright | Steve Solomon | 2:56 |
| 5. | "Nicotine" | Belt, Schmidt | | 3:28 |
| 6. | "Interlude (Instrumental)" | | | 1:25 |
| 7. | "Art of Moving On" | Schmidt, Steve Solomon | Steve Solomon | 3:43 |
| 8. | "Passing Time" | Josh Cumbee, Afshin Salmani, Schmidt | AFSHeeN | 4:13 |
| 9. | "Could You Be Home" | Schmidt, Denny White | Denny White | 3:57 |
| 10. | "That’s What Makes You Mine" | Nate Caserta, Nick Hexum, Zack Hexum, Schmidt | | 3:12 |
| 11. | "Everything Has Changed" | Josh Cumbee, Afshin Salmani, Schmidt | AFSHeeN | 3:19 |
| Total length: | | | | 36:36 |

Deluxe edition
| No. | Title | Writer(s) | Producer(s) | Length |
|---|---|---|---|---|
| 12. | "One Track Mind" | Collin Masiel, Michael Maughan, Schmidt | PWER, Schmidt | 3:19 |
| 13. | "Not Alone" | Deina Andreou, John Flanagan, Sean Hamilton, Schmidt | Sean Hamilton | 4:20 |
| 14. | "Love Defined" | Sean Hamilton, Schmidt, Bryce Soderberg, Alex Teamer | | 3:23 |
| 15. | "Parallel" (Mack & Jetset Vega Remix) | Gad, Schmidt | Gad | 5:48 |
| 16. | "Could You Be Home" (Ras Remix) | Schmidt, Denny White | Denny White | 3:34 |
| Total length: | | | | 57:38 |

== Personnel ==
Credits for Happy Mistakes adapted from AllMusic and album's liner notes.

Heffron Drive

- Kendall Schmidt – vocals, rhythm guitar, bass
- Dustin Belt – lead guitar

Production

- Kendall Schmidt – A&R, composer, executive producer, producer
- Dustin Belt – composer, producer
- Toby Gad – composer, producer
- Afshin Salmani – composer, producer
- Steve Solomon – composer, producer
- Denny White – composer, producer
- Non Fiction – composer, producer
- Cameron Walker-Wright – composer, producer
- Josh Cumbee – composer
- Michael Cammarata – executive producer, management
- Nate Caserta – composer
- Nick Hexum – composer
- Zack Hexum – composer

== Charts ==
Chart performance for Happy Mistakes
| Chart (2014) | Peak position |
|---|---|
| US Billboard 200 | 84 |
| US Independent Albums (Billboard) | 19 |
