= Cherryland (album) =

Studio album by The Ready Set
- Released: October 27, 2023
- Genre: Hyperpop; synthpop
- Length: 33:03
- Label: The Ready Set Music
- Producer: Jordan Witizigreuter

The Ready Set chronology
V2 (2018)	Cherryland (2023)

Singles from Cherryland
- 1. "Who You Really Are" Released: May 26, 2023; 2. "Teammate" Released: July 7, 2023; 3. "ACT 2" Released: August 18, 2023; 4. "Loose Change" Released: September 29, 2023

Cherryland is the sixth studio album released by American electropop singer-songwriter The Ready Set. The album was released independently on October 27, 2023, and is his first album in seven years since his 2016 album, I Will Be Nothing Without Your Love.

== Background and release ==
Following the release of V1 and V2, Witzigreuter temporary took a step back from The Ready Set in 2019 and adopted a new name, Onlychild. According to Witzigreuter at the time, he wanted to create "raw tracks" such as "Teeth" and "Crimson Red".

Cherryland is The Ready Set's first album in seven years since his 2016 album, I Will Be Nothing Without Your Love. The album was announced in August 2023. Witzigreuter stated that the theme of album deals with, "accepting yourself as an artist and learning to stop overthinking everything so much." He described the record as sad, joyful, anxious and hopeful. He also stated that the idea of Cherryland came up two years ago where parts of the songs were written years ago, while some were written weeks ago.

"Who You Really Are" was released on May 26, 2023 as the lead single from the album. Witzigreuter spoke about the track with idobi Radio: "It's really chaotic sounding... It may be polarizing, which I kind of wanted. The whole vibe of it feels like sort of a mix of what all of the new stuff is, it's so many different things at once. It's supposed to feel really chaotic, it just feels like anxiety. Which sort of sums up a lot of the thesis of this and that. But it's hopeful, too." The music video for the single was released on June 9, 2023, and was directed by Ryan Blewett. "Teammate" was released on July 7, 2023 as the album's second single. "ACT 2" was released as the album's third single on August 18, 2023. "Loose Change" was released on September 29, 2023 as the fourth and final single from the album.

== Promotion ==
In support of the album's release, The Ready Set joined Boys Like Girls on the Speaking Our Language tour in the fall of 2023. He also announced a concert show at the Echo in Los Angeles for May 7, 2024.

== Reception ==
Keaton Mae of The Honey Pop gave the album a positive review. She praised the album's first track, "Gateway" for its opening and strong chorus. She described the fifth track, "Telemetry" as a "full evolution of a certain kind of TRS song," comparing the track to previous Ready Set songs such as "World Owes Nothing" and "The Witching Hour". She complimented the writing on the tenth track "2 & 3". She called the second track, "Cherryland", "mindblowing," and praised the vocals and pop sound. Maria Serra of idobi Radio stated that the album possesses "game-changing bouncy synth-pop" tracks and praised the single "Act 2", noting how Witzigreuter "has matured into an even more authentic version of himself."

== Track listing ==
Standard edition
No.	Title	Length
1.	"Gateway"	3:12
2.	"Cherryland"	2:34
3.	"Loose Change"	2:17
4.	"Who You Really Are"	3:20
5.	"Telemetry"	2:56
6.	"KO"	2:13
7.	"Echo"	3:36
8.	"Act 2"	2:09
9.	"Safety Raft"	2:54
10.	"2 & 3"	4:26
11.	"Teammate"	3:21
Total length:		33:03

Deluxe edition
No.	Title	Length
12.	"Interlude/The Light"	2:19
13.	"Leech"	2:55
14.	"Flow My Tears"	2:17
15.	"Heavy Rain" (featuring Onlychild)	4:50

== Release history ==
Release dates and formats for Cherryland
Region	Date	Format(s)	Label	Ref.
Various	October 27, 2023	Digital download; streaming	The Ready Set Music	
Various	May 10, 2024	Digital download; streaming	The Ready Set Music	
