= Weatherstar (band) =

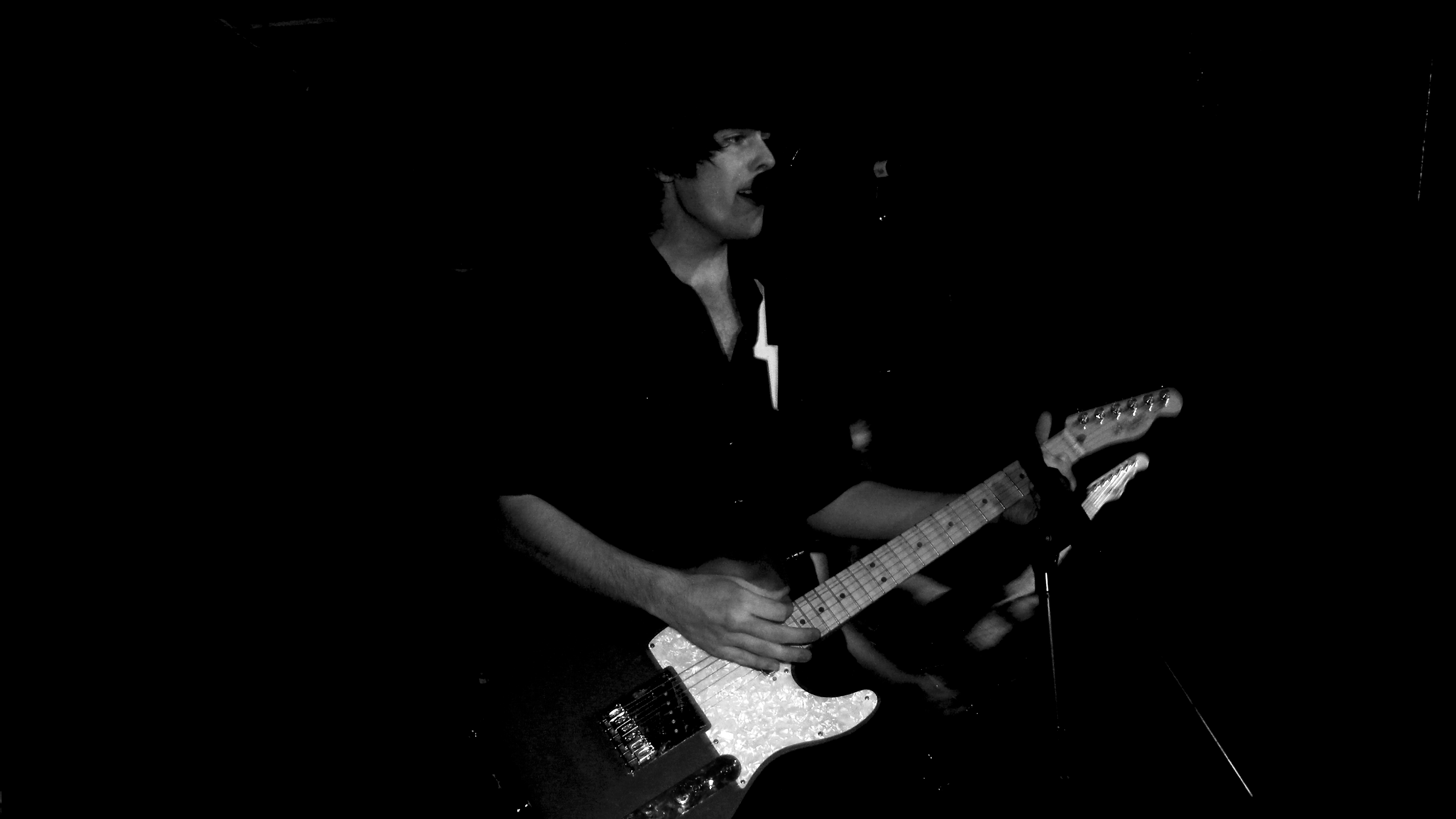
- Weatherstar performing in 2010

Background information
- Origin: Southport, Connecticut, United States
- Genres: Pop rock; pop punk
- Years active: 2009–2018
- Labels: The Working Group
- Past members: Cameron Walker-Wright; Billy Toti; Julian Walker; Izaiah Yelle; Jimmy Coberly

Weatherstar was an American pop rock group that originated in 2009 in Southport, Connecticut. The group started out as a solo project by founding member Cameron Walker-Wright, before turning into a full band. The group has released five extended plays and seven singles. They were also featured on the compilation album, A Tribute to Alkaline Trio, released through Pacific Ridge Records.

== History ==
Weatherstar formed in the summer of 2009 by lead vocalist and guitarist, Cameron Walker-Wright. The band started out as a solo project, before turning into a full band. The band name came from lyrics of the group's songs that referred to the weather. The band topped the PureVolume's Top Unsigned Bands of 2009 charts. The group released their self-titled debut EP on May 4, 2010, which includes the songs, "Wish You Would Stay" and "Postcards". The group toured with The Bigger Lights, The Graduate and You Me and Everyone We Know, as well as performing at the Vans Warped Tour in 2010. In August 2010, the band released their second EP titled, Acoustic. On April 19, 2011, Weatherstar released their debut single, "Crystal Ball" along with the B-side, "Can't Get Away From U". The band released a free EP Covers, in April 2011.

In August 2011, the band joined Plug In Stereo on their first headling tour, Nothing to Something, along with Bird By Bird. In October 2011, Weatherstar joined Before You Exit and Mitchy Collins on the Next Big Thing tour. In November 2011, their fourth EP, Christmas Makes the Heart Grow Fonder was released, along with the lead single "It's Not Christmas Without You Here". Additionally, a remix to "Crystal Ball" by Andrew Goldstein was released that same month. In December 2011, the group joined The Ready Set on his Acoustic tour. They also performed at the Glamour Kills holiday festival that same month.

In March 2012, they released their fifth EP, Out in the Rain. In March 2013, the group released a new single, "Better Off Alone", intended for their upcoming EP. In April 2013, the group toured with Move Out West, Crash the Party, Like Violet and Safe Bet Secret. In October 2013, Walker revealed that the band had gone on hiatus as he wanted to focus on a new project, Animal Fiction. In 2015, Weatherstar returned as a solo project and released a new single, "Time" on SoundCloud. In 2018, Walker announced via Twitter that new music would be released.

== Musical style ==
Their music has been described as pop rock and pop punk. Walker stated, "We are real dudes trying to make real music inspired by the music we love. We love pop/rock music and it is our calling to create it in new ways." In 2012, Walker formed a new group with his brother, Julian Walker called Brothers, which he called an extension to Weatherstar due to the musical direction that "shifted to a more organic sound."

== Members ==
=== Former members ===
- Cameron Walker-Wright – lead vocals, guitar (2009–2018)
- Billy Toti – drums (2010)
- Julian Walker – lead guitar (2013)
- Izaiah Yelle – bass guitar (2013)
- Jimmy Coberly – drums (2013)

=== Former touring members ===
- Matt LiVigni – bass guitar, backing vocals (2009–2010)
- Jesse Weyher – drums (2009–2010)

== Discography ==
=== Extended plays ===
List of extended plays with selected details
Title	Album details
Weatherstar	Released: May 4, 2010; Label: The Working Group; Format: CD, digital download
Acoustic	Released: August 18, 2010; Label: The Working Group; Format: CD, digital download
Covers	Released: April 2011; Label: The Working Group; Format: Digital download
Christmas Makes the Heart Grow Fonder	Released: November 29, 2011; Label: The Working Group; Format: Digital download
Out in the Rain	Released: March 1, 2012; Label: The Working Group; Format: Digital download

=== Singles ===
List of singles
Title	Year	Album
"Crystal Ball"	2011	Non-album singles
"Go"	2011	Non-album singles
"Closer"	2011	Non-album singles
"It's Not Christmas Without You Here"	2011	Christmas Makes the Heart Grow Fonder
"Better Off Alone"	2013	Non-album singles
"Snow"	2013	Non-album singles
"Time"	2015	Non-album singles

=== Other appearances ===
Title	Year	Artist(s)	Album	Notes	Ref.
"Radio"	2011	Various Artists	A Tribute to Alkaline Trio	Guest appearance	
