= Dustin Belt =

American actor, rapper and singer

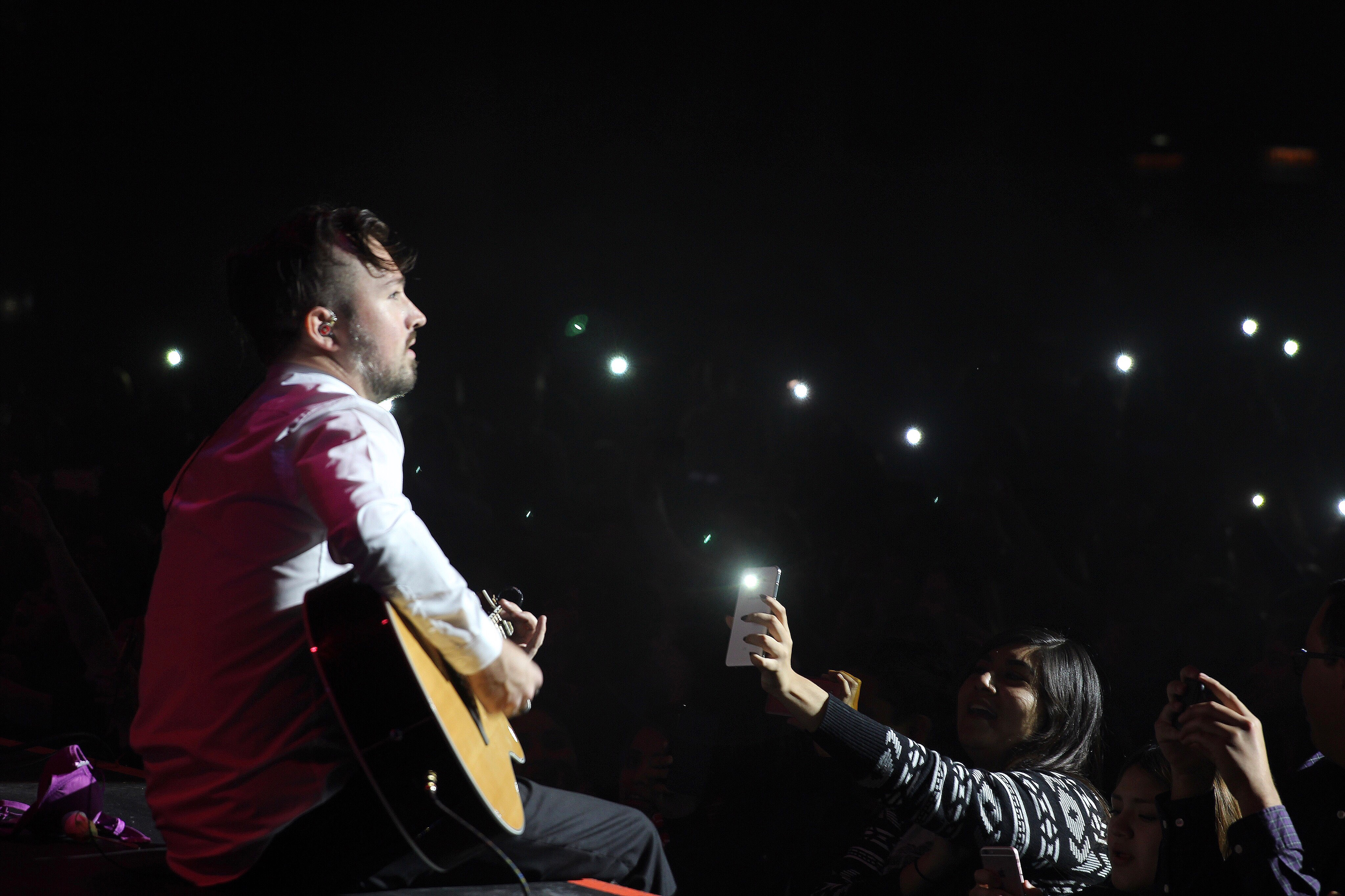
- Belt performing in 2017

Background information
- Born: Dustin Earl Belt; December 3, 1987 (age 38); Wichita, Kansas, U.S.
- Origin: Wichita, Kansas, U.S.
- Genres: pop; pop rock; alternative
- Occupations: Actor; singer; producer; songwriter
- Instruments: vocals; guitar; bass; piano
- Years active: 2007–present
- Label: TOLBooth
- Formerly of: Heffron Drive
- Website: heffrondrive.com

Dustin Earl Belt (born December 3, 1987) is an American guitarist and music producer.

He was a founding member of the indie pop duo, Heffron Drive, and the touring guitarist for the Nickelodeon/Sony boy band, Big Time Rush. Heffron Drive's first single, "Parallel", was released in March 2014 through the record label TOLBooth Records.

Heffron Drive's first album Happy Mistakes was released on September 9, 2014. Upon release, it charted at No. 84 on the Billboard Top 200 and at No. 14 on the Billboard Pop Charts.

== Life and career ==
=== 2001–2013: Career beginning ===
Belt was born in Wichita, Kansas, to Earl and Carol Belt. He began as an actor in kindergarten where he attended Buckner Performing Arts Magnet in Wichita. When he was 11 years old, his family moved from Kansas to California for pilot season. They returned to Kansas but shortly thereafter moved permanently to Los Angeles in 2001. Belt went on to have a career as a working commercial and print actor appearing in commercials for Allstate Insurance, Sony PlayStation, McDonald's, AT&T and Sony Vaio computers. In 2004 Dustin met Kendall Schmidt at an industry event in Hollywood. They became friends and later began the project known as Heffron Drive, named after the street they both lived on.

Schmidt had purchased some recording equipment and assembled a studio in his bedroom where the two began creating music together. They posted their music on the website Myspace, where they began garnering tens of thousands of "plays" a day. Dustin was referred to BTR's management by Kendall to be the lead guitarist for the live band. Dustin accepted the job and spent the next 4.5 years touring the world with the group. His first show with the band was "The Today Show" in New York City where they played for a live crowd of 5,000 and a syndicated crowd of over 4 million. He can be seen in performances on "Ellen", "MTV Hits", "Live! With Kelly" and "The National Tree Lighting Ceremony".

While on the road with BTR, Dustin and Kendall continued to work on music for Heffron Drive in their downtime.

=== 2013–2018: Heffron Drive ===
After Big Time Rush ended in late 2013, Heffron Drive was revived as a band as the full-time project of Dustin & Kendall. They released their first single "Parallel" in early 2014. Happy Mistakes, Heffron Drive's first album, was released September 9, 2014, and premiered on the Billboard 200 at No. 84 and on the Billboard Pop Charts at No. 14. The band embarked on a 26 city tour to promote the album, covering a majority of the United States and addition dates in Mexico. In October through December 2014, Dustin co-produced Heffron Drive's acoustic album Happy Mistakes: Unplugged which was released April 28, 2015. The album was completely produced by Belt and Schmidt and released through Schmidt owned TOLBooth Records.

Heffron Drive performed at the "A Capitol Fourth" celebration broadcast on PBS in July 2014 and toured internationally promoting both albums with stops in Mexico, Uruguay, Argentina, Brazil, and Italy.. Dustin worked with RedBull and RedBull.tv as a social media influencer, covering music festivals across America. Heffron Drive announced the release of their new EP The Slow Motion, which was released worldwide on February 10, 2017. The EP included 4 new songs, including the single "Living Room", released on January 13. A tour with stops in Mexico City, Monterrey, Guadalajara, Moscow, St. Petersburg, Amsterdam, Paris, Lyon, Milan, Turin and Rome took place in support of the EP release.

== Discography ==
=== Writing credits ===
Year	Title	Band	Album	Role
2009	Got Ur Heart	Mitchel Musso	Brainstorm	writer
2014	Happy Mistakes	Heffron Drive	Happy Mistakes	writer, producer, engineer, guitars, bass, programming
2014	Nicotine	Heffron Drive	Happy Mistakes	writer, producer, engineer
2014	That's What Makes You Mine	Heffron Drive	Happy Mistakes	co-producer
2014	Interlude	Heffron Drive	Happy Mistakes	writer, co-producer
2015	Happy Mistakes	Heffron Drive	Happy Mistakes:Unplugged	writer, producer, engineer, guitars, bass, programming
2016	Rain Don't Come	Heffron Drive	Single	writer, producer, engineer, guitars, bass, programming, background vocals
2016	Don't Let Me Go	Heffron Drive	Single	writer, producer, engineer, guitars, programming
2017	The Slow Motion EP	Heffron Drive	EP	writer, producer, engineer, guitars, bass, programming
