= Good Enough (The Ready Set song) =

2016 single by The Ready Set

Single by The Ready Set

from the album I Will Be Nothing Without Your Love
- Released: February 5, 2016
- Recorded: 2015
- Genre: Dancepop; indie pop; synthpop
- Length: 3:17
- Label: Hopeless
- Songwriter: Jordan Witzigreuter
- Producer: Witzigreuter

The Ready Set singles chronology
"Fangz" (2014)	"Good Enough" (2016)	"Disappearing Act" (2016)

Music video
- "Good Enough" on YouTube

"Good Enough" is a song by American electropop artist The Ready Set. It was released on February 5, 2016, as the lead single from his fifth studio album, I Will Be Nothing Without Your Love. It was written and produced by Witzigreuter. A remix version was released in May 2016, with Haitian DJ Michaël Brun.

== Background ==
Witzigreuter stated, "The record as a whole feels like a reinvention of myself, I stripped everything down and produced the whole thing by myself from top to bottom, so it could feel 100% true to what I wanted it to be. It's a fresh start."

The remix version of "Good Enough" was released on May 20, 2016. The song featured Michaël Brun who helped produced the track with Witzigreuter. The original version of the song never charted anywhere, however, the remix version peaked at number 40 on the Billboard Dance/Mix Show Airplay chart.

== Composition ==
The original version of "Good Enough" has been described as synthpop and indiepop, whereas the remix adds a more dancepop sound with progressive music influences.

== Music video ==
The music video for "Good Enough" was directed by Erik Rojas and released on February 5, 2016.

== Track listing ==
Digital download – single
No.	Title	Length
1.	"Good Enough"	3:17

Digital download – Michael Brun remix
No.	Title	Length
1.	"Good Enough (Michael Brun x The Ready Set)"	3:34

== Charts ==
Chart performance for "Good Enough"
Chart (2016)	Peak position
US Dance/Mix Show Airplay (Billboard)	40

== Release history ==
Release dates and formats for "Good Enough"
Region	Date	Format	Versions	Label	Ref.
Various	February 5, 2016	Digital download	Original	Hopeless	
Various	May 20, 2016	Digital download	Remix	Hopeless	
