= The Ready Set =

American singer-songwriter, performer, and musician (born 1989)

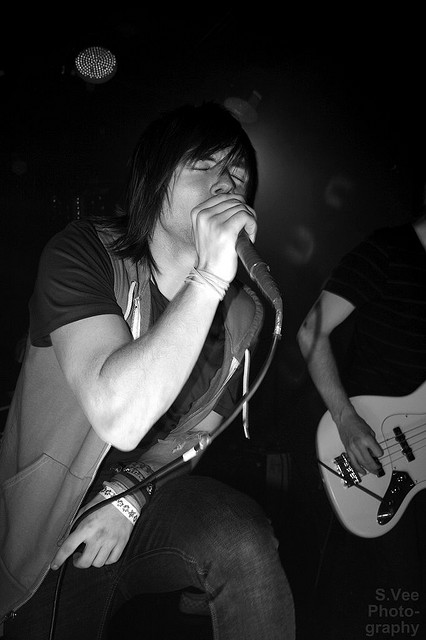
- The Ready Set in 2009

Background information
- Born: Jordan Mark Witzigreuter; November 14, 1989 (age 37); Fort Wayne, Indiana, United States
- Genres: Electropop; indie pop; synth-pop; pop
- Occupations: Singer; songwriter; musician; record producer
- Instruments: Vocals; piano; guitar; bass; keyboards; drums
- Years active: 2008–2019, 2022–present (as the Ready Set); 2019–2022 (as Onlychild)
- Labels: Sire; DCD2; Beluga Heights; Reprise; Warner Bros.; Razor & Tie; Hopeless; Big Machine
- Website: Official website

Jordan Mark Witzigreuter (born November 14, 1989), known professionally as The Ready Set, is an American singer-songwriter and musician from Fort Wayne, Indiana, United States. He is the lead vocalist and sole member of the act, using a backup band while on tour. known professionally as The Ready Set is an American singer, songwriter, musician and record producer. He has released six studio albums, Syntax and Bright Lights, Tantrum Castle, I'm Alive, I'm Dreaming, The Bad & the Better, I Will Be Nothing Without Your Love and Cherryland, ten extended plays and seventeen singles. He is best known for the commercially successful single "Love Like Woe" from his major label debut, I'm Alive, I'm Dreaming.

From 2019 to 2022, Witzigreuter briefly released music under the name Onlychild. He has released twelve singles and a four-track EP, Solstice under this name.

Witzigreuter is also a part of the synthpop band Nekokat, alongside Cameron Walker, and Jess Bowen of the Summer Set.

In 2021, in collaboration with Walker, Witzigreuter created the music label Swim Team Records. The company has featured a multitude of artists such as Future Coyote, TALKBAK, and Casey Abrams. The label's music has been featured in promotion for things such as the PGA Tour.

== Early life ==
Witzigreuter was born and raised in Fort Wayne, Indiana, a location he frequently mentions in his music. At the age of 11, his mother signed him up for drum lessons. This led to him playing the drums in bands throughout middle school and high school. After becoming acquainted with other instruments, he began touring with bands and writing songs at the age of 16. As a seventeen-year-old, Witzigreuter participated in various bands playing drums for the ska band Take Sides and the hardcore band Saints Never Surrender. With Take Sides, the band participated in a Battle of the Bands in his hometown and won the competition. Witzigreuter was also credited on Saints Never Surrender's sophomore album, Brutus, which was released in 2008. He was also in the acoustic band brideandgroom. He is a graduate of Homestead High School.

== Career ==
=== 2007–09: Syntax and Bright Lights and Tantrum Castle ===
In 2007, Witzigreuter began making music independently in the basement of his childhood home under the name the Ready Set. He decided to go under this name because of his long last name and felt that the Ready Set was better and easier to say. According to Witzigreuter, the name refers to being "ready to set all of your fears and worries behind and just do what you really want to do." His first two albums Syntax and Bright Lights and Tantrum Castle were released in 2008. Initially uploading his music to the once popular Myspace, Witzigreuter then began performing his music live. His first performances took place at The Mocha Lounge in Fort Wayne, Indiana, a coffee shop where he worked. His performances evolved to that of a live band, and he began performing for music festivals. These included The Bamboozle and Bamboozle Left, the Bamboozle Roadshow, and the mtvU VMA Tour. He also opened for Boys Like Girls and Never Shout Never. He released a three-track EP, Stays Four the Same on June 23, 2009, via iTunes.

The Ready Set has also made performances on MTV on multiple occasions, including an appearance on MTV's TJ Search Live Finale and being the "One to Watch" on MTV's 10 on Top. Witzigreuter has also been featured twice on MTV's Buzzworthy.

=== 2010–11: I'm Alive, I'm Dreaming and Feel Good Now ===
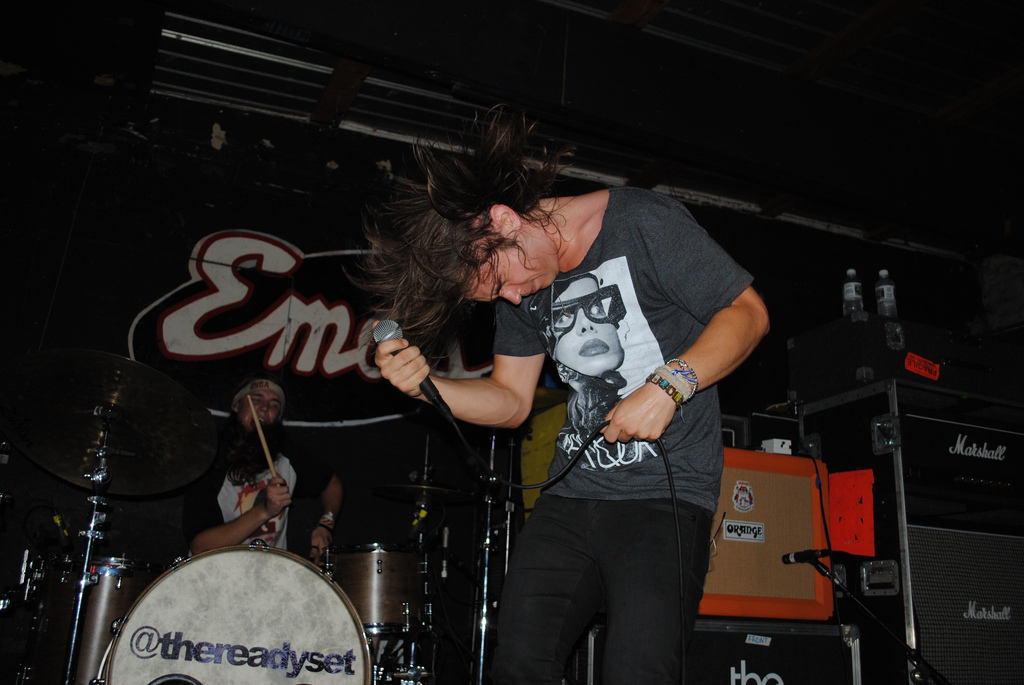
The Ready Set performing at Emo's in 2010.

In 2009, Witzigreuter attracted the interest of several record labels, including Universal, RCA, Jive, Mercury and Triple Crown. In November 2009, Pete Wentz signed Witzigreuter to his label Decaydance Records. An early version of "Love Like Woe" was sent to Wentz who took one listen to it and decided to sign him to the label. He also felt that Witzigreuter was "passionate and believes in himself," hence why he signed him to the label. Recording for his third studio album started in 2009, where he flew out to Los Angeles, Miami and Atlanta, working with different producers. His debut single, "Love Like Woe" was released on March 29, 2010. It was met with commercial success peaking at number 27 on the Billboard Hot 100 and number 30 on the Canada CHR/Top 40 chart. This led to the song being certified platinum by the RIAA and winning the BDS Certified Spin Award based on the 50,000 spins it received. "More Than Alive" was released as the second single from the album on May 25. The Ready Set's major label debut and third studio album, I'm Alive, I'm Dreaming, was made available for streaming on June 8. It was officially released on June 14. The album peaked at number three on the Heatseekers Albums chart and at number 172 on the Billboard Top Current Album Sales chart. In support of the album's release, Witzigreuter went on tour in the fall of 2010 with Cartel, Hey Monday, This Century, and We Are the In Crowd.

In September 2010, the Ready Set was named MTV Push Artist of the Week. In November 2010, Witzigreuter was a part of the Punk Goes Pop Volume 03. compilation album performing the track, "Airplanes". On November 24, the Ready Set released a Christmas song titled "Wishlist", which peaked at number 32 on the Holiday Digital Song Sales chart. On November 26, he released a Christmas EP, Regifted. The three-track EP features "Wishlist", a cover of Paul McCartney's "Wonderful Christmastime" and an acoustic version of "More Than Alive". In February 2011, he embarked on his first headlining tour called, "The Glamour Kills Tour" with supporting acts from Allstar Weekend, We Are the In Crowd and The Downtown Fiction. The tour concluded on April 9, in Witzigreuter's hometown. He also performed at the South By Southwest Music Festival in March, along with Enter Shikari, the Downtown Fiction, among many more.

On March 1, 2011, the Ready Set released "Young Forever" from his upcoming EP. The song peaked at number 39 on the US Mainstream Top 40 and at number five on the US Bubbling Under Hot 100 chart. He released the EP's second single, "Hollywood Dream" on August 19. "Killer" was released as the third single for streaming via his website on September 27. On October 7, the Ready Set released his EP, Feel Good Now which was produced by Ian Kirkpatrick. The EP peaked at number 179 on the Billboard 200. He joined All Time Low on a fall tour from October to November 2011, along with He Is We and Paradise Fears. In December, the Ready Set performed a few acoustic holiday shows with Breathe Electric, Plug in Stereo, and Weatherstar.

In an interview with Alternative Press, Witzigreuter stated that he had plans to re-release Tantrum Castle, however, those plans appear to be scrapped. In January 2012, Witzigreuter was featured in an episode of Disney Channel's So Random!. He joined A Rocket to the Moon, Forever the Sickest Kids and the Summer Set for a Philippines tour in February. He also toured in Australia and South America in March, in support of the EP. In the spring of 2012, the Ready Set and Breathe Carolina co-headlined the Blackout Forever Tour with support from Ashland High.

=== 2012–15: The Bad & The Better ===
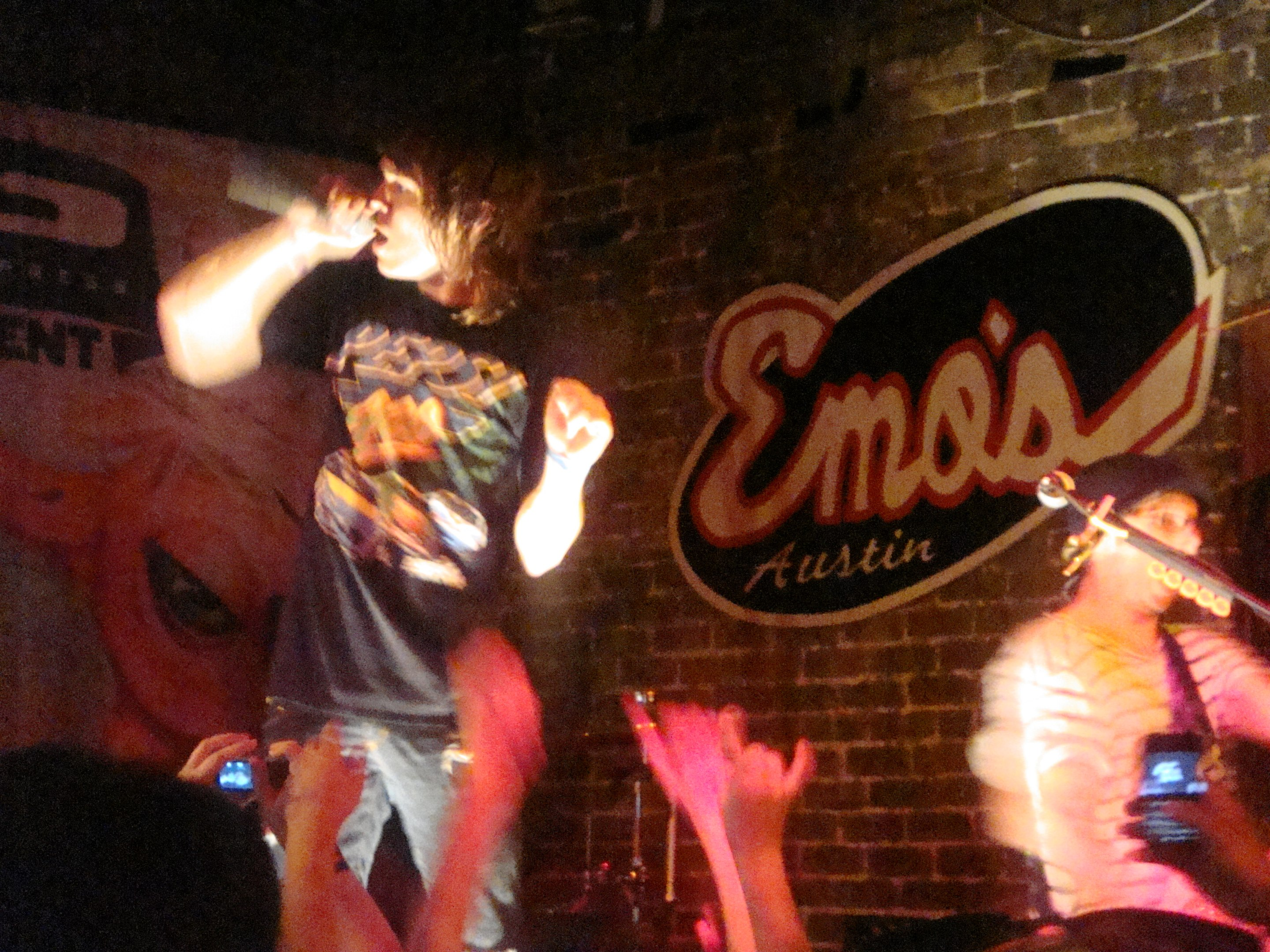
The Ready Set performing live in 2011

In January 2012, Witzigreuter began working on a new album in Los Angeles. On May 18, 2012, The Ready Set released the song, "Give Me Your Hand (Best Song Ever)" which was released through Warner Records and later served as the lead single from his fourth studio album, The Bad & The Better. The song peaked at number 30 on the US Mainstream Top 40 and number 33 on the New Zealand Top 40 chart. In May 2012, he confirmed he had finished a third of the album and after finishing writing 25 songs, he planned to continue writing for the majority of the summer, flying out to California during his time off to work on the rest of the album. He hoped for a release date sometime later that year in the fall.

In February 2013, the Ready Set co-headlined a US tour with Outasight. In May 2013, he released a remix EP for "Give Me Your Hand (Best Song Ever)" titled, GMYH V.2. In June 2013, Witzigreuter confirmed that he finished writing the album. Prior to releasing his fourth studio album, he released a handful of EP's including, I'll Be Waiting, produced by his live guitarist Deryck Stanek and Sorry, Sorry. He toured in North America with Breathe Carolina and rapper T. Mills in August 2013. After leaving Decaydance following his third studio album, he subsequently signed with the label Razor & Tie. In December 2013, the Ready Set released "I Don't Wanna Spend Another Christmas Without You", featured on Punk Goes Christmas.

On March 18, 2014, he announced the release date for The Bad & The Better, released on May 27. He worked with producer Ian Kirkpatrick again on the album. "Higher" served as the album's second single and was released on April 8. "Freakin' Me Out" was released on May 6, as the third single from the album. The album peaked at number 75 on the Billboard 200. In addition to The Bad & the Better, he also released The Celebrity EP. He served as an act on Warped Tour in the summer of 2014. In August, he released a non-album single titled "Trash Talking Love", featuring Kitty.

In October 2014, The Ready Set co-headlined a tour with Metro Station called, The Outsiders Tour with supporting acts, the Downtown Fiction and Against the Current. A live music video for the album's fourth single, "Fangz" was released on December 10. In 2015, Witzigreuter started a side project band Nekokat with singer-songwriter Cameron Walker-Wright and drummer Jess Bowen of The Summer Set.

=== 2016–18: I Will Be Nothing Without Your Love and V1 & V2 ===
Following a one-year hiatus of releasing music under the Ready Set, Witzigreuter signed with Hopeless Records in November 2015. Upon his return as the Ready Set, Witzigreuter stated in a 2016 interview with Alternative Press that he almost ended the Ready Set following the release of The Bad & the Better. He felt that he was in a "weird spot at the end of 2014," feeling like he wasn't "progressing" as an artist and cited burn out as a reason for taking a break as the Ready Set and starting Nekokat. While working on the new side project, it helped motivate him into writing music again and helped him learn a lot about production.

On February 5, 2016, "Good Enough" was released as the lead single from his fifth studio album, I Will Be Nothing Without Your Love. The album's second single, "Disappearing Act" was released on March 11. The album was officially released on April 8, which was written, produced and engineered by Witzigreuter by the end of 2015. The album peaked at number 24 on the US Independent Albums chart. In May 2016, he collaborated with Haitian DJ Michael Brun and released a remix to "Good Enough". The remix version peaked at number 40 on the Dance/Mix Show Airplay chart. The Ready Set embarked on the Fight For Something tour in the spring of 2016 with Tonight Alive, Set It Off and SayWeCanFly. He also joined Emblem3 and Megan Nicole on tour in July 2016.

In 2017, Witzigreuter continued releasing with Nekokat, whilst also appearing on features for other artists. He released the song "Cotton Candy", a collaboration with Call Me Karizma. In 2018, he started to release music independently again with two extended plays: V1 and V2. "Life In Pink" was released on February 15, 2018, as the lead single from V1. He released another single, "Stitch" on July 27, 2018, as the lead single from V2. Another EP, V3, was set for release in October 2018, however was pushed back for a later date.

=== 2019–2022: Onlychild ===
In mid-2019, Witzigreuter temporarily took a step back from The Ready Set and adopted a new name, Onlychild. He stated that the reasoning for this decision was to create "something where the initial love of the thing came from." He also added that he would return to the Ready Set at some point but wanted to focus on Onlychild for the time being. He released his first EP Solstice under that name on July 27, 2019. He also began co-writing for other artists, joining Breathe Carolina on "In the Dark" from their 2019 album, Dead: The Album. In May 2020, Onlychild released the single, "Chardonnay and Tangerine".

In January 2021, Witzigreuter started a record label with Walker-Wright called, Swim Team Records. In May 2021, Onlychild collaborated with American Teeth on the single, "Sloppy". In October 2021, Witzigreuter and Nekokat collaborator Cameron Walker contributed writing credits to the single "Rock with You" on South Korean band Seventeen's mini-album Attacca.

=== 2022–present: return of The Ready Set and Cherryland ===
Witzigreuter revived the Ready Set name in 2022 at the So What Music Festival and performed under that name at the 2022 When We Were Young Festival. In May 2023, Witzigreuter released his first solo single under the Ready Set name since 2018 titled, "Who You Really Are". Another single followed in July 2023 titled "Teammate". In August 2023, Witzigretuer released a hyperpop track "ACT 2", which serves as the third single from his sixth studio album. He joined Boys Like Girls on the Speaking Our Language Tour in the fall of 2023. On August 25, 2023, Witzigreuter announced his sixth studio album, Cherryland which was released on October 27, 2023. In October 2023, Witzigreuter joined Boys Like Girls on a reimagined version of their song, "The Outside". In support of the album's release, Witzigreuter performed a concert show at the Echo in Los Angeles on May 7, 2024. On May 20, Witzigreuter signed with Big Machine Records.

Witzigreuter is confirmed to be making an appearance at Welcome to Rockville, which will take place in Daytona Beach, Florida in May 2026.

== Musical styles and influences ==
The Ready Set's music is described as electropop and synth-pop. Witzigreuter has stated that he typically likes to blend his sound ranging from pop to hip-hop to hardcore punk. Witzigreuter grew up listening to Copeland which he has stated as his main influence. He also cited inspiration from Daft Punk and Kanye West. The Ready Set has also been compared to Owl City, generally for his sound, work as a one-man band and how he uses a live band while on tour.

The Ready Set finds inspiration in songwriting based on personal experiences, stating, "some of it's just situations I think of and write a song about. Each one is hopefully a little different from the next. It depends on the song. Sometimes I'll have lyrics where it's probably only something I'll get or nobody really knows about. But it's nothing, like, too weird or anything. I try to make it relatively cool."

== Touring members ==
=== The Ready Set ===
Current touring members

- Cameron Walker – guitar, backing vocals
- Dave Briggs – drums, percussion

Former touring members

- Travis Rountree – drums, percussion
- Matthew Shaughn – bass guitar
- Mike Naran – guitar, backing vocals
- Nick Annis – bass guitar, keyboards
- Deryck Stanek – guitar, backing vocals
- Andy Snyder – bass guitar
- Keegan Weckler – guitar

=== Onlychild ===
Final touring members

- Mike Naran – guitar, backing vocals
- Jess Bowen – drums, percussion

== Personal life ==
Witzigreuter married his longtime girlfriend Katelyn Gentry in late 2017. Witzigreuter has a brother who is also a musician.

== Discography ==
=== The Ready Set ===
- Syntax & Bright Lights (2008)
- Tantrum Castle (2009)
- I'm Alive, I'm Dreaming (2010)
- The Bad & the Better (2014)
- I Will Be Nothing Without Your Love (2016)
- Cherryland (2023)

=== Onlychild ===
- Solstice EP (2019)

== Awards and nominations ==
=== BDS Spin Awards ===
Year	Nominated	Award	Result	Ref.
2010	"Love Like Woe"	50,000 Spins	Won	

=== MTV Buzzworthy ===
Year	Nominated	Award	Result	Ref.
2010	I'm Alive, I'm Dreaming	Fan Favorite Album	Won	

=== PETA's Libby Awards ===
Year	Nominated	Award	Result	Ref.
2012	The Ready Set	Most Animal-Friendly Band	Nominated	
2014	The Ready Set	Most Animal-Friendly Band	Won	

== Filmography ==
Year	Title	Role	Notes	Ref.
2011	Silent Library	Themselves	Contestants	
2011	The Seven	Themselves	Guest performers	
2012	So Random!	Themselves	Guest performers	
2013	Oh Sit!	Themselves	Guest performers	

== Tours ==
Headlining

- Glamour Kills Tour (2011)
- Blast From the Past Tour (2017)

Co-headlining

- Blackout Forever Tour (with Breathe Carolina) (2012)
- The Ready Set/Outasight Tour (with Outasight) (2013)
- The Outsiders Tour (with Metro Station) (2014)

Opening act

- Rise and Fall of My Pants Tour (All Time Low) (2011)
- Fight For Something Tour (Tonight Alive) (2016)

Festivals

- South By Southwest Music Festival (2011)
- Warped Tour (2011), (2014), (2015)
- Rose Rock Tour (2017)
- Fall Fest Tour (2017)
- So What Music Festival (2022)
- When We Were Young Festival (2022)
