= Call Me Karizma =

American singer-songwriter and rapper

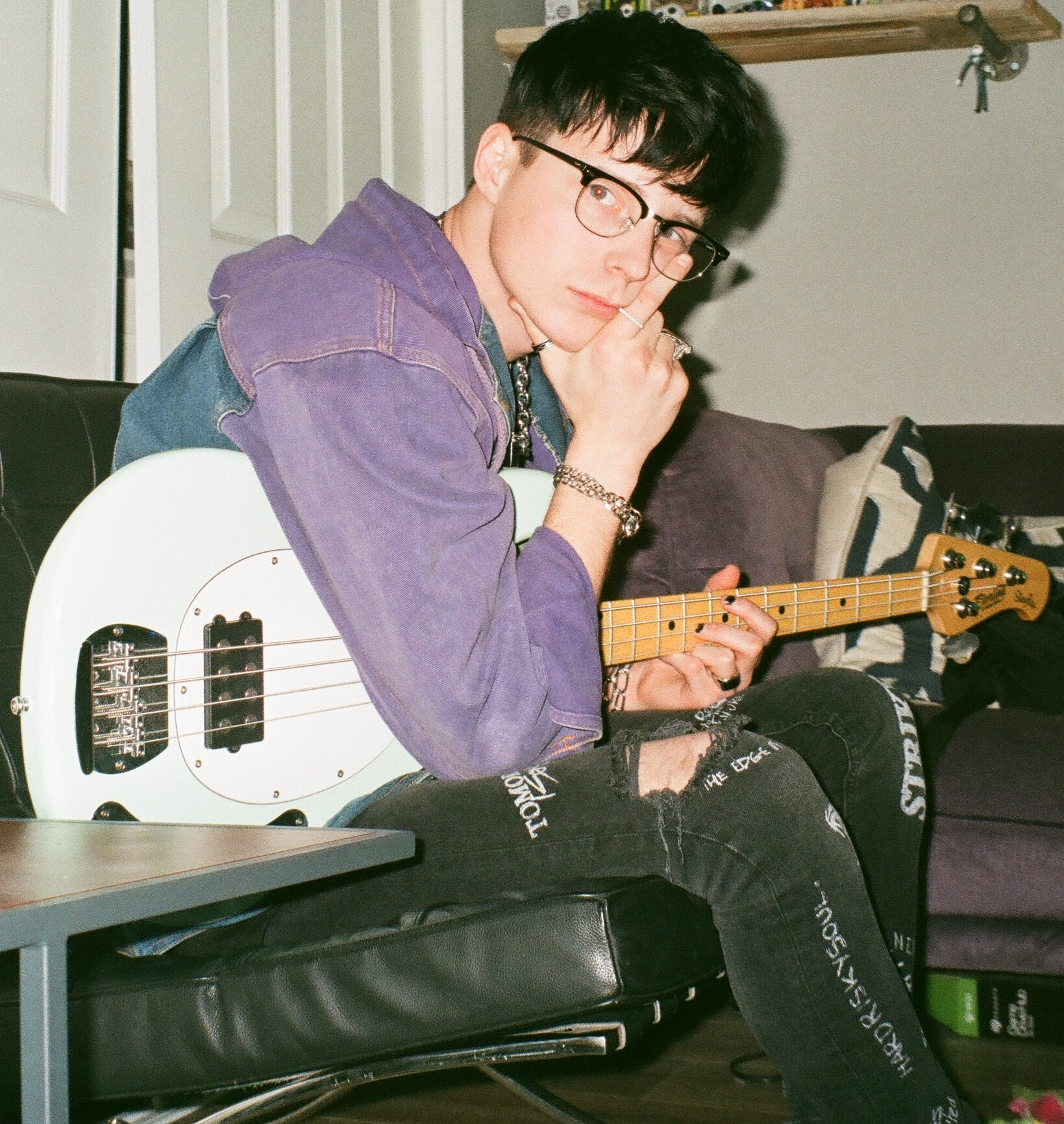
- Parriott in 2020

Background information
- Born: Morgan Francis Parriott; April 28, 1995 (age 31); New Prague, Minnesota, U.S.
- Genres: Post-pop, hip hop, punk
- Occupations: Singer-songwriter, rapper
- Years active: 2015–present
- Labels: Independent (2020–2021, 2023-present); Thriller Records (2021–2023); Arista Records (2018–2020)
- Website: callmekarizma.com

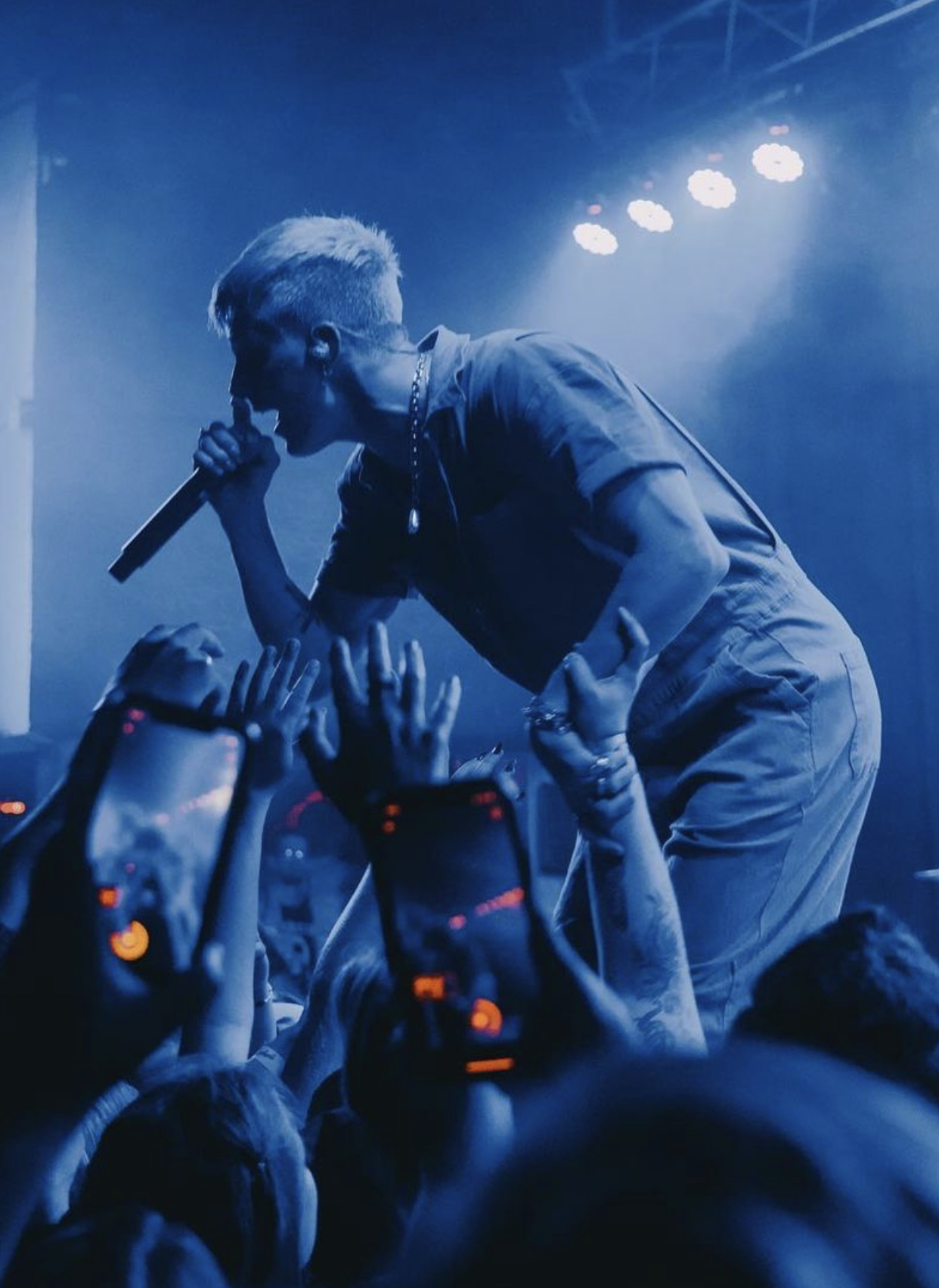
Parriott performing in Denver on the Bleached Serpent Tour in October 2021

Morgan Francis Parriott (born April 28, 1995), known professionally as Call Me Karizma, is an American singer-songwriter and rapper from New Prague, Minnesota. His music tends to be within the hip hop and punk genres.

His music career started in 2015, when Parriott toured with American rappers Mod Sun and blackbear and released his debut album, Uninvited, a year later. In 2018, he signed with Arista Records and released his first extended play (EP) The Gloomy Tapes, Vol. 1 with Vol. 2 following a year later. In 2020, he left Arista and released his second album To Hell With Hollywood.

== Early life ==
Morgan Parriott was born in 1995 and is originally from New Prague, Minnesota. He started writing songs at age 12.

== Career ==
In February 2015, whilst studying as sophomore (second year of study) in college he assisted American rappers Mod Sun and Blackbear in a 35-date tour as a result of fans tweeting at them. Parriott released his debut album Uninvited in 2016.

In summer 2018, he released his first extended play (EP) called The Gloomy Tapes, Vol. 1, as part of his three part The Gloomy Tapes EP series.

In 2018, Parriott signed to Arista Records. He released the single "Serotonin" on 30 November 2018 which explores themes of mental health, depression and anxiety, the first song he released with Arista. Also in November 2018, Parriott released a collaboration called "God Damnit" with American DJ, Illenium. Under Arista, The Gloomy Tapes, Vol 2 was released in February 2019. His lead single "Monster (under my bed)" of Vol. 2 was featured on the television show The Purge on the seventh episode of the second season. Additionally, the song according to Billboard, peaked at number 33 on the "Mainstream Rock Airplay" on 30 March 2019.

Parriott left Arista Records in March 2020. Additionally, he has opened for Wiz Khalifa and has worked with producer David Pramik. As of 2018, he has completed four tours of the United States.

In July 2021, Parriott signed to Thriller Records. Thriller is a new label founded by Bob Becker who also founded Fearless Records. Later in the year, Parriott toured in the United States to promote a new EP entitled Bleached Serpent. Several of the tour dates were sold out.

His music has been described as pop and post-pop, hip hop and punk. He is regarded as a singer, songwriter, and rapper. According to Substream Magazine, he has a strong fanbase in Germany, Russia, and Ukraine.

== Personal life ==
Parriott has been married since 2023. In 2024, he and his wife welcomed a daughter.

== Discography ==
=== Albums ===
- Uninvited (2016)
- To Hell With Hollywood (2020)
- Francis (2022)
- The Gloomy Tapes, Vol. 3 (2026)

=== EPs ===
- The Gloomy Tapes, Vol. 1 (2018)
- The Gloomy Tapes, Vol. 2 (2019)
- Bleached Serpent (Sept 24, 2021)

=== Singles ===
Title	Year	Peak chart positions	Albums/EP
Title	Year	US Main.	Albums/EP
"Monster (Under My Bed)"	2019	33	The Gloomy Tapes, Vol. 2
"Madhouse"	2024	40	The Gloomy Tapes, Vol. 3

=== As featuring artist ===
- "Black Magic" (The Ready Set featuring Call Me Karizma) (2018)
- "God Damnit" (Illenium with Call Me Karizma) (2018)
- "Untouchable" (Futuristic featuring Call Me Karizma) (2019)
- "Hello My Loneliness" (Delaney Jane featuring Call Me Karizma) (2019)
- "F**k Up" (Gabriel Black featuring Call Me Karizma) (2019)
- "Part of Me" (Три дня дождя featuring Call Me Karizma) (2021)
- "ob-la-di, ob-la-die" (Stain The Canvas featuring Call Me Karizma) (2022)
- "Kryptonite" (Три дня дождя featuring Call Me Karizma) (2023)
- "Poison" (Wildways featuring Call Me Karizma) (2024)
- "Rather be Dead" (DSPRITE featuring Call Me Karizma) (2024)

== Touring members ==
- Noah Bouhadana - Drums (2019-present)
- Phil "Ouwop" Alvarez - Guitar, Programming, Vocals (2022-present)
