= Nekokat =

- Origin: Los Angeles, California United States
- Genres: Pop; synth-pop; indie pop
- Years active: 2015–2018
- Labels: Razor & Tie
- Past members: Jordan Witzigrueter; Cameron Walker; Jess Bowen
- Website: wearenekokat.com

Nekokat was an American synthpop band and supergroup that originated in Los Angeles, California. The band formed in 2015 and is composed of Jordan Witzigreuter of The Ready Set, Cameron Walker of Twin XL, and Jess Bowen of The Summer Set.

== History ==
The band's name is a reference to the Japanese word for cat, neko. Singer Jordan Witzigreuter had thought of the name from big inflatable stage props he had on a tour.

Nekokat was formed in 2015, and consists of three members. Their first single, "Gimme A Break" was released in June 2015. According to guitarist Cameron Walker, the song started as a track idea Wiztigreuter made. The song was originally intended to be a track featuring Bowen on The Ready Set’s fifth studio album, I Will Be Nothing Without Your Love. The band released their debut EP, Communication that same month. The group premiered a music video for "The Reckless" in November 2015. In late 2015, the group released their second EP, Communication II.

In 2017 the group released a new single titled, "Melt". In September 2017, the group released another single titled, "Take" along with its music video. As a reaction to the Stoneman Douglas High School shooting in 2018, the group along with Switchfoot, Thrice, Copeland and many others, joined together to share a cover of Tom Petty's "I Won't Back Down" to the Parkland community during the annual Heavy and Light event. In June 2018, the band released their third and final EP, Pleasure Beach.

== Musical style ==
Their musical style has been described as pop punk and electropop. The trio has cited inspiration from Saves The Day, Passion Pit and The Cure.

== Band members ==
- Jordan Witzigreuter – lead vocals (2015–2018)
- Cameron Walker – vocals, guitar, bass (2015–2018)
- Jess Bowen – drums, percussion, backing vocals (2015–2018)

== Discography ==
Nekokat has released three EPs, ten singles and two music videos.

=== Extended Plays ===
Year	EP details	Track listing
2015	Communication: Released: June 23, 2015; Label: Razor & Tie; Format: Digital download	Track listing: 1. "The Reckless"; 2. "Gimme a Break"; 3. "Communication"; 4. "Don't Be Loud"
2015	Communication II: Released: November 6, 2015; Label: Independent; Format: Digital download	Track listing: 1. "Best Year Ever"; 2. "Emery"; 3. "Realm"; 4. "Cut My Teeth"; 5. "What I Said"
2018	Pleasure Beach: Released: June 15, 2018; Label: Nekokat Music; Format: Digital download	Track listing: 1. "Board It Up"; 2. "I Believe In What You Are"; 3. "My Brain"; 4. "Traffic"; 5. "You You You"; 6. "Crossfire"

=== Singles ===
Title	Year	Album
"Gimme a Break"	2015	Communication
"Boys Don't Cry"	2015	Non-album single
"Melt"	2017	Non-album single
"Haunted"	2017	Non-album single
"Bella Goodbye"	2017	Non-album single
"Take"	2017	Non-album single
"Warchild"	2017	Non-album single
"Board It Up"	2018	Pleasure Beach
"I Believe In What You Are"	2018	Pleasure Beach
"My Brain"	2018	Pleasure Beach

=== Music videos ===
Title	Year	Director(s)	Ref.
"The Reckless"	2015	OMG! Everywhere	
"Take"	2017	Ryan Blewett	
