= The Bad & the Better =

Studio album by The Ready Set
- Released: May 27, 2014
- Recorded: 2012–2014
- Genre: Electropop; pop
- Length: 47:23
- Label: Razor & Tie
- Producer: Ian Kirkpatrick; Andrew Goldstein; Dan Book; Alexei Misoul

The Ready Set chronology
| The Celebrity EP (2014) | The Bad & the Better (2014) | I Will Be Nothing Without Your Love (2016) |

Singles from The Bad & the Better
- 1. "Give Me Your Hand (Best Song Ever)" Released: May 18, 2012; 2. "Higher" Released: April 8, 2014; 3. "Freakin' Me Out" Released: May 6, 2014; 4. "Fangz" Released: December 10, 2014

The Bad & the Better is the fourth studio album by American electropop singer-songwriter The Ready Set. The album title was announced on March 18, 2014, along with the track listing. It was released on May 27, 2014, by Razor & Tie Records. The album was released as a 4 track-EP featuring the singles "Higher", "Freakin' Me Out" and "Give Me Your Hand (Best Song Ever)" plus the song "Carry Me Home" digitally outside the United States.

== Background ==
In December 2011, Jordan Witzigreuter confirmed that he would be working on a new album in January 2012 in Los Angeles. In May 2012, he revealed to Alternative Press that he had finished a third of the album. He had finished writing 25 songs and planned to continue writing for the majority of the summer, flying out to California during his time off to work on the album. According to Witzigreuter, he also worked on some tracks on the bus and in airports, rather than spending time in the studio to work on it. He hoped for a release date sometime in the fall of 2012. However, he delayed the release and decided to release a preview for the album titled, Sorry, Sorry, featuring two tracks "Are We Happy Now?" and "Freakin' Me Out" which were expected to be on the album. On June 6, 2013, Witzigreuter announced that he finished writing his fourth studio album on Twitter. The album was mastered in August 2013 and was mainly produced by Ian Kirkpatrick. After releasing several EPs, Witzigreuter felt that "it was time" and that "A full album just seems like something that's overdue." Collaborating with other songwriters on the album, Witzigreuter felt that the process was "a lot more cohesive altogether."

On March 18, 2014, the Ready Set signed to Razor & Tie Records announcing the release of his upcoming album, The Bad & the Better. Witzigreuter spoke about being signed to Razor & Tie stating, "I'm so excited to be signed to Razor & Tie. I feel like it's a great opportunity to get more of my music out there in really creative ways, and I've already seen a ton of passion. I think it's going to be a great partnership." Co-owner of Razor & Tie Cliff Chenfeld added, "We are very excited that Jordan and The Ready Set have chosen to work with Razor & Tie. Jordan is an amazing talent and we will do everything we can do to get his music to the largest possible audience." About the album title, Witzigreuter said it "means perspective."

In support of the album, the Ready Set performed at Warped Tour from June to August 2014. He later co-headlined a tour with Metro Station called, The Outsiders Tour with supporting acts, the Downtown Fiction and Against the Current in October 2014.

== Composition ==
Witzigreuter stated that he wanted the album to sound different from his previous works. He wanted the album to "feel honest" and described the record as "guilt-free pop." Witzigreuter described songs such as "Freakin' Me Out", "Carry Me Home", "Bitter & The Sweetness" and "Luxury" as "straight up pop songs" with "light-hearted-storytelling." He wrote "Bleeding" from the perspective of "coming to that realization of the need to step back." He also stated that the song is about "wanting to help somebody out of a bad spot but realizing you can't." He described "Higher" as an inspirational track and one of the more uplifting songs off the album. He found writing "Freakin' Me Out" a lot easier than coming up with a concept for the music video.

== Singles ==
The Ready Set released "Give Me Your Hand (Best Song Ever)" as the first single from The Bad & the Better on May 18, 2012. The song peaked at number 30 on the US Mainstream Top 40 and at number 33 in New Zealand. The second official single, "Higher", was released on April 8, 2014. The song was serviced to contemporary hit radio in the United States on May 6, 2014. That same day, the third single, "Freakin' Me Out" was released for digital download. The music video was released on October 15, 2014, via VEVO. A live music video for the track "Fangz" directed by Sergio Padilla was released on December 10, 2014.

== Critical reception ==
Professional ratings
Review scores
| Source | Rating |
|---|---|
| AllMusic | 3.5/5 stars |
| Alternative Press | 2.5/5 stars |
| idobi Radio | 9/10 stars |
| New Noise Magazine | 5/5 stars |

Tim Sendra of AllMusic rated the album three-and-a-half stars, remarking how the release is "all AM pop giddiness, spunky energy, and soft-pedaled, cuddly heartbreak", and how "It's machine-driven, it's juvenile, and it's not going to change the world, but it's a bunch of fun and that's plenty." At Alternative Press, Evan Lucy rated the album two and a half stars, stating that the release is "ultimately disappointing." Emillie Marvel of idobi Radio noted how the album strayed away from the electronic elements that his previous album, I'm Alive, I'm Dreaming possessed, instead focusing on a Top 40 radio sound. Sky Fisher of New Noise Magazine praised the album's "catchy lyrics and electro-pop beats," as well as describing "Carry Me Home" and "Are We Happy Now?" as standout tracks.

== Track listing ==
The Bad & the Better — CD version
| No. | Title | Writer(s) | Producer(s) | Length |
|---|---|---|---|---|
| 1. | "Higher" | Jordan Witzigreuter; Ian Kirkpatrick; Josh Moran | Kirkpatrick | 3:42 |
| 2. | "Freakin' Me Out" | Witzigreuter; Kirkpatrick; Moran; Greg Camp | Kirkpatrick | 3:06 |
| 3. | "Are We Happy Now?" | Witzigreuter; Kirkpatrick | Kirkpatrick | 3:48 |
| 4. | "Fangz" | Witzigreuter | Kirkpatrick | 3:24 |
| 5. | "Carry Me Home" | Witzigreuter | Kirkpatrick | 3:07 |
| 6. | "Luxury" | Witzigreuter; Kirkpatrick; Moran | Kirkpatrick | 3:05 |
| 7. | "Bitter and the Sweetness" | Witzigreuter; Kirkpatrick | Kirkpatrick | 3:31 |
| 8. | "Don't You Need Me" | Witzigreuter; Andrew Goldstein | Goldstein | 3:18 |
| 9. | "Bleeding" | Witzigreuter; Kirkpatrick | Kirkpatrick | 3:23 |
| 10. | "Castaway" (featuring Jake Miller) | Witzigreuter; Andrew Goldstein; Simon Wilcox; Jake Miller | Goldstein | 3:55 |
| 11. | "Give Me Your Hand (Best Song Ever)" | Witzigreuter; Goldstein; Wilcox | Goldstein | 3:48 |
| 12. | "For the Better" | Witzigreuter | Kirkpatrick | 1:45 |
| 13. | "More Than This" | Witzigreuter; Kirkpatrick; Dan Book; Alexei Misoul | Kirkpatrick; Book; Misoul | 3:45 |
| 14. | "Terrible Things" | Witzigreuter | Kirkpatrick | 3:46 |
| Total length: | | | | 47:23 |

The Bad & the Better — EP version
| No. | Title | Writer(s) | Producer(s) | Length |
|---|---|---|---|---|
| 1. | "Higher" | Witzigreuter; Kirkpatrick; Moran | Kirkpatrick | 3:42 |
| 2. | "Freakin' Me Out" | Witzigreuter; Kirkpatrick; Moran; Camp | Kirkpatrick | 3:06 |
| 3. | "Give Me Your Hand (Best Song Ever)" | Witzigreuter; Goldstein; Wilcox | Goldstein | 3:48 |
| 4. | "Carry Me Home" | Witzigreuter | Kirkpatrick | 3:07 |
| Total length: | | | | 13:43 |

== Personnel ==
Credits for The Bad & the Better adapted from AllMusic.

- Jordan Witzigreuter – cover design, producer
- David Beame – legal advisor
- Dylan Chenfeld – A&R
- David Conway – management
- Serban Ghenea – mixing
- Andrew Goldstein – producer
- Dirk Hemsath – management
- Bob Hoch – marketing
- Jon Kaplan – mixing
- Ian Kirkpatrick – producer
- Jared Kocka – photography
- Joe LaPorta – mastering
- Joseph McCarthy – layout
- Jake Miller – featured artist
- Eric Palmqwist – mixing, producer
- Danny Rukasin – management

== Charts ==
Chart performance for The Bad & the Better
| Chart (2014) | Peak position |
|---|---|
| US Billboard 200 | 75 |
