= Give Me Your Hand (Best Song Ever) =

Single by the Ready Set

from the album The Bad & the Better
- Released: May 18, 2012
- Recorded: 2011
- Genre: Dance-pop; pop
- Length: 3:48
- Label: Warner Bros.
- Songwriters: Jordan Witzigreuter; Simon Wilcox; Andrew Goldstein
- Producer: Goldstein

The Ready Set singles chronology
| "Killer" (2011) | "Give Me Your Hand (Best Song Ever)" (2012) | "Higher" (2014) |

Music video
- "Give Me Your Hand (Best Song Ever)" on YouTube

"Give Me Your Hand (Best Song Ever)" is a song by American electropop artist the Ready Set. It was released digitally on May 18, 2012, as the lead single from his fourth studio album The Bad & the Better, before it was serviced to contemporary hit radio on October 23, 2012. The song was featured in the 2013 animated film Escape from Planet Earth and the trailer for The Smurfs 2. A digital EP for the single titled, GMYH V.2 was released on May 3, 2013.

== Background and composition ==
"Give Me Your Hand (Best Song Ever)" is a dance-pop song about a man and his girlfriend, and how she said a song he played for her was the "Best song ever", resulting in it being their song. The song musically has dance and pop influences with breakdowns after the choruses. The song was produced by Andrew Goldstein. After having gone back and forth with the mixes between Witzigreuter and Goldstein, the song was finished in January 2012.

A teaser for the song was released on May 15, 2012. The song was made available for streaming via Alternative Press on May 17, and was released as an official single the following day. A lyrics video premiered on May 22, featuring a girl translating the song into sign language. The song was included on Now That's What I Call Music! Vol. 44. The Ready Set performed the song on the American game show, Oh Sit!.

On May 2, 2013, a remix created by Silas premiered via SoundCloud, before a remix EP for the song titled GMYH V.2 was released the following day. The EP includes remixes by Jump Smokers and Zookeper.

== Reception ==
"Give Me Your Hand (Best Song Ever)" has been well received by music critics. MTV's Jenna Rubenstein described the song as "...the brightest, sunniest, catchiest, most radio-friendly pop song you've ever heard..." and compared it to Owl City and Carly Rae Jepsen's song "Good Time".

== Chart performance ==
"Give Me Your Hand (Best Song Ever)" peaked at number 30 on the US Mainstream Top 40, remaining on the chart for twelve weeks. The song also reached number 33 on the New Zealand Top 40 and stayed two weeks on the chart.

== Music video ==
In June 2012, it was announced that filming for the "Give Me Your Hand (Best Song Ever)" music video would begin within the coming weeks. The video was shot in August 2012. It premiered via MTV on October 3, 2012. The video was directed by Matt Alonzo.

The music video starts out with Witzigrueter and his friends getting ready for a party. It also shows girls getting ready at a different house. It then shows Jordan and his friends walking to the party, as well as their female counterparts doing the same. The rest of the video features heavy partying and Jordan singing in the crowded house.

== Track listing ==
Digital download
| No. | Title | Length |
|---|---|---|
| 1. | "Give Me Your Hand (Best Song Ever)" | 3:49 |

GMYH V.2
| No. | Title | Length |
|---|---|---|
| 1. | "Give Me Your Hand (Best Song Ever)" (Zookeper remix) | 3:43 |
| 2. | "Give Me Your Hand (Best Song Ever)" (SILAS remix) | 3:57 |
| 3. | "Give Me Your Hand (Best Song Ever)" (Pleather remix) | 4:11 |
| 4. | "Give Me Your Hand (Best Song Ever)" (Ghengis Cuts remix) | 3:36 |
| 5. | "Give Me Your Hand (Best Song Ever)" (Jay Dabhi and Moises Modesto remix) | 3:41 |
| 6. | "Give Me Your Hand (Best Song Ever)" (Jump Smokers remix) | 3:47 |

== Charts ==
Chart performance for "Give Me Your Hand"
| Chart (2013) | Peak position |
|---|---|
| New Zealand (Recorded Music NZ) | 33 |
| US Pop Airplay (Billboard) | 30 |

== Release history ==
Release dates and formats for "Give Me Your Hand"
| Region | Date | Format | Label | Ref. |
|---|---|---|---|---|
| Various | May 18, 2012 | Digital download | Warner | |
| United States | October 23, 2012 | Contemporary hit radio | Warner | |

== In popular culture ==
The song was used in Smithfield-Selma High School's lipdub video for the FOX 50's 2013 Lip Dub Project competition.
