= Heffron Drive =

American indie-pop duo

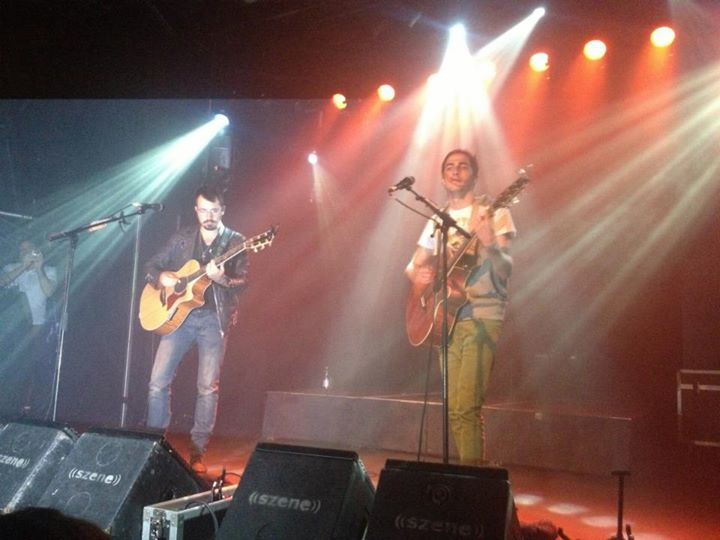
- Belt and Schmidt in 2014

Background information
- Origin: Burbank, California, U.S.
- Genres: Pop rock; indie rock
- Years active: 2008–2009; 2013–2018
- Labels: TOLbooth
- Past members: Kendall Schmidt; Dustin Belt
- Website: heffrondrive.com

Heffron Drive was an American duo formed by Kendall Schmidt and Dustin Belt, both originally from Kansas. It was originally formed in 2008 after Kendall and Dustin met each other by chance and realized they lived on the same street, Heffron Drive, in Burbank, California.

== History ==
In 2008, Kendall Schmidt and Dustin Belt formed the band Heffron Drive. The name refers to the street on which both members lived, Heffron Drive, in Burbank, California. The duo began releasing music on MySpace and soon gained attention on the internet. However, in 2009, Schmidt joined the boyband Big Time Rush and Heffron Drive was on a break. Subsequently, Belt joined as the group's touring guitarist. In May 2013, after Tanya Chisholm said that the series Big Time Rush was not being continued, Heffron Drive was revived. The duo soon started working on and recording new material.

On October 17, 2013, it was announced that Heffron Drive would be going on a winter tour; it started in Houston on November 23, and ended on December 22 in Los Angeles. In March 2014, the duo released their debut single, "Parallel". The song peaked at number 25 on the iTunes Pop charts. On July 29, 2014, Heffron Drive announced their debut studio album, Happy Mistakes, as well as an international tour in support of the album. On August 4, the duo premiered the track, "One Track Mind" live. The album was officially released on September 9. Happy Mistakes peaked at number 84 on the Billboard 200.

On January 14, 2017, the band released a new song and music video for their single "Living Room". Their next release was on January 19, 2018, when they released a new song and music video titled "Mad At The World", and later "Separate Lives".

== Discography ==
=== Studio albums ===
List of studio albums, with selected chart positions
Title	Album details	Peak chart positions	
Title	Album details	US	US Indie
Happy Mistakes	Released: September 9, 2014; Formats: CD, digital download; Label: TOLBooth	84	19
"—" denotes releases that did not chart or were not released in that territory.

=== Live albums ===
List of live albums, with selected chart positions
Title	Album details	Peak chart positions
Title	Album details	US Heat
Happy Mistakes: Unplugged	Released: April 28, 2015; Formats: Digital download; Label: TOLBooth	16
"—" denotes releases that did not chart or were not released in that territory.

=== Extended plays ===
Title	Album details
The Forthcoming	Released: April 1, 2009; Formats: Digital download; Label: TOLBooth
The Slow Motion EP	Released: February 10, 2017; Formats: LP, Cassette, digital download; Label: TOLBooth

=== Singles ===
List of singles
Song	Year	Album
"Parallel"	2014	Happy Mistakes
"Happy Mistakes"	2015	Happy Mistakes
"Art of Moving On"	2015	Unplugged
"Eyes on You	2015	Non-album singles
"Rain Don't Come"	2016	Non-album singles
"Don't Let Me Go"	2016	Non-album singles
"Living Room"	2017	The Slow Motion EP
"Slow Motion"	2017	The Slow Motion EP
"One Way Ticket"	2017	Non-album singles
"Mad at the World"	2018	Non-album singles
"Separate Lives"	2018	Non-album singles
"Hot Summer"	2018	Non-album singles
"Black on Black"	2018	Non-album singles

== Tours ==
- Winter Tour (2013–2014)
- Happy Mistakes Tour (2014–2016)
- Summer Tour (2016)
- The Slow Motion Tour (2017)
- One Way Ticket Tour (2017–2018)
