= Cameron Walker-Wright =

American singer-songwriter

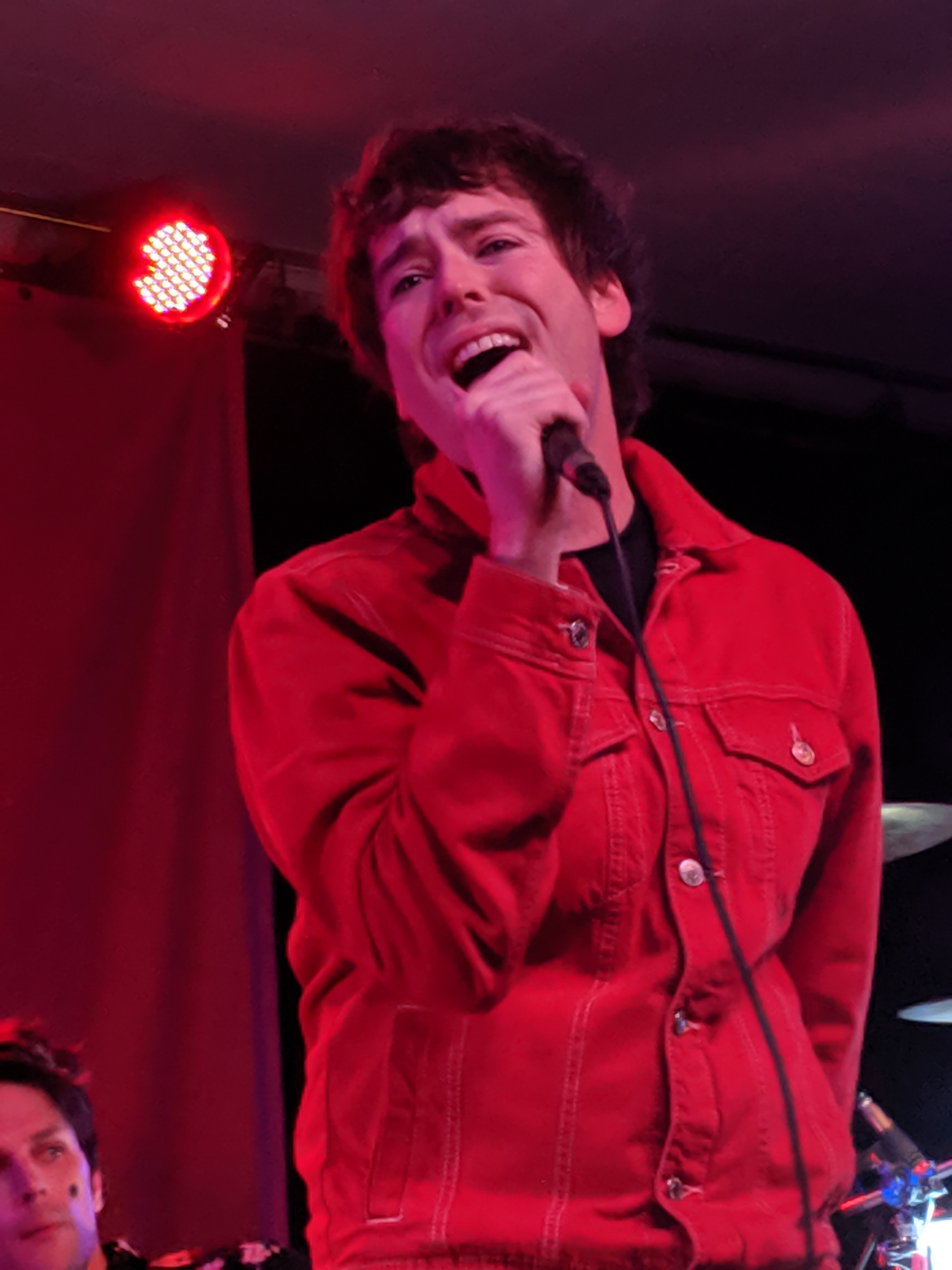

Background information
- Born: Cameron Alexander Francis Walker-Wright; April 24, 1989 (age 36); Southport, Connecticut
- Occupations: Singer-songwriter; musician
- Instruments: Vocals; guitar; bass
- Years active: 2009–present
- Member of: Twin XL
- Formerly of: Nekokat, Animal Fiction, Weatherstar
- Website: www.cameronwalkerwright.com

Cameron Alexander Francis Walker-Wright (born April 24, 1989), professionally known as Cameron Walker, is a singer, songwriter, producer, and artist from Southport, Connecticut. He is currently in the supergroup band Twin XL along with John Gomez and Stephen Gomez.

He is currently based in Los Angeles, CA and has written songs for bands and artists such as Lindsey Stirling, All Time Low, Sabrina Carpenter, and The Ready Set. He is also known from the band Weatherstar.

Cameron has composed music for brands such as Apple, T-Mobile, Victoria's Secret, and Sleepy's. In addition, he has composed music for the networks NBC, ABC, and ESPN.

== Career ==
In 2009, Walker formed the band Weatherstar. The band released their self-titled debut EP in 2010 and includes the songs, "Wish You Would Stay" and "Postcards". The group toured with The Bigger Lights, The Graduate and You Me and Everyone We Know, as well as performing at the Vans Warped Tour in 2010. In April 2011, an EP entitled, Crystal Ball was released. In November 2011, a Christmas EP titled, Christmas Makes the Heart Grow Fonder was released along with the lead single, "It's Not Christmas Without You Here".

In 2012, his band Nineteen 80 Five (1985) was signed to Songs Music Publishing. Since then the band has gone on to release a collection of EPs and released the single, Summer Forever, on Hollywood Records. In September 2012, Walker debuted a new project with his brother Julian Walker called Brothers. They released their debut single, "12 Degrees" that same month. The duo later released "It's Not Christmas Without You Here" and cover of "Christmas (Baby, Please Come Home)" for streaming via Alternative Press in December 2012. In January 2013, Nineteen 80 Five released "Everything's Perfect" as the lead single from their second EP, which was released in February. In 2014, Cameron signed to songwriter and producer, David Hodges, as his first signing to his publishing company Third & Verse which was a joint venture with Kobalt Music Group.

Walker-Wright has played guitar, bass guitar and wrote several songs for The Ready Set. Walker wrote "Disappearing Act", "Concrete", "Run with Me" and "Swim" on The Ready Set's fifth studio album, I Will Be Nothing Without Your Love.

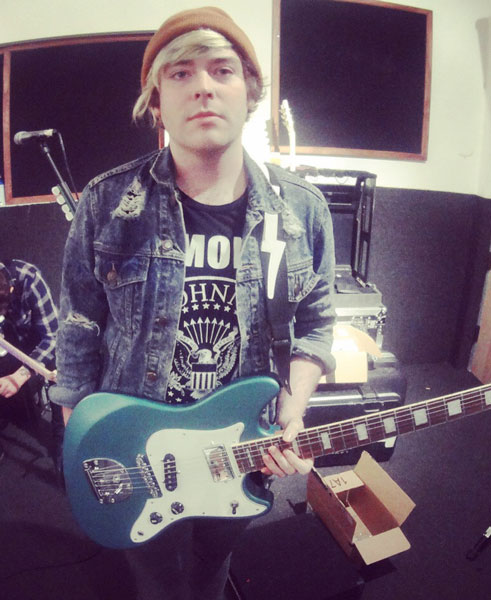
Cameron Walker from Twin XL

He is one third of the indie pop group Nekokat along with Jordan Witzigreuter (The Ready Set) and Jess Bowen (drummer of The Summer Set). In September 2016, he released a single titled, "Just Come Home". In May 2017, he released another single titled, "I'm Sorry", under the name, Alexander Francis.

In 2018, he joined brothers Stephen and John Gomez of The Summer Set to form the band Twin XL. As of 2023, they released one studio album titled Hyperfantasia, two EPs and 13 singles. The band makes all of their own music, start-to-finish, and have admitted that it is "sometimes difficult" to balance recording with performances. Previously, the band toured with Jukebox The Ghost and The Mowgli's for the Making Friends Tour of 2019, and toured with I Dont Know How but They Found Me the same year. They ended 2019 touring with The Maine for The Mirror tour, and toured with Fitz and the Tantrums in 2020. The band released their debut studio album, Hyperfantasia on May 19, 2023.

In early 2021, Cameron started a music label with fellow artist Jordan Witzigreuter, Swim Team Records. The company has featured Future Coyote, TALKBAK, and Casey Abrams. The label's music has been featured in promotion for the PGA Tour. Walker wrote "Rock with You" by Seventeen for their ninth EP, Attacca.

== Discography ==
Musical History
Year	Projects	Albums/ EPs	Singles
2009	Weatherstar	Weatherstar Acoustic Crystal Ball Go Closer Christmas Makes The Heart Grow Fonder (A Weatherstar Holiday Collection) Out In The Rain Covers EP	Snow For The First Time (Cover) Believe All Talk
2012	Brothers		12 Degrees
2012	1985	Congratulations Everything's Perfect	Summer Forever Days Like This
2012	The Ready Set (touring member)	I Will Be Nothing Without Your Love (Songwriter)	Disappearing Act (Songwriter)
2014	Animal Fiction	Animal Fiction EP Yellow! Pink! Green! Happy Thoughts We'll Go Places Anything Can Happen I Really Like It Cold Oh No! Symmetry Real Again Start Again (2020, Writer)	Enjoy The Ride Lone Wolf
2015	Bye Bye	Take Me Home	
2016	Cameron Walker		Just Come Home
2017	Nekokat	Communication Communication II Pleasure Beach	Boys Don't Cry Haunted Haunted (Acoustic) Bella, Goodbye Take Warchild Up In Smoke Melt
2018	Alexander Francis		I'm Sorry
2018	Twin XL	How To Talk To Strangers	Messy Messy (Extended Version) Melt Problematic Lemonade Lonely (with Little Hurt & Rad Horror) Slow Heart Want You (Unreleased) Upgrade

Writing
Year	Band/ Artist	Album	Song
2012	We The Kings	Somewhere Somehow	Say It Now
2013	Age Of Days	radioactivity	Ready To Go
2014	The Kettles	You're Not You Soundtrack	Finally Free
2014	Heffron Drive	Happy Mistakes	Had to be Panama
2014	Sabrina Carpenter	Eyes Wide Open	We'll be the Stars
2015	Wish I Was	Wish I Was	Cutting Ties
2015	All Time Low	Future Hearts	Cinderblock Garden
2015	David Hodges	The December Sessions, Vol. 3	Under The Influence
2015	David Hodges	The December Sessions, Vol. 3	The Other Road
2015	David Hodges	The December Sessions, Vol. 3	The Only Story
2016	David Hodges	The December Sessions, Vol. 4	Lovers In Orbit
2016	Sophia Kameron	Connected	Connected
2016	Borgeous	13	Over the Edge
2016	Tor Miller		All Fall Down
2016	The Summer Set	Stories For Monday	All In
2016	Tonight Alive	Limitless	How Does It Feel
2016	Arrows to Athens	Exile	City Of Angels
2016	The Ready Set	I Will Be Nothing Without Your Love	Disappearing Act
2016	The Ready Set	I Will Be Nothing Without Your Love	Swim
2016	The Ready Set	I Will Be Nothing Without Your Love	Concrete
2016	The Ready Set	I Will Be Nothing Without Your Love	Run With Me
2017	Outasight	Ritchie	Feel Good
2018	Lindsey Stirling	Warmer In The Winter	Time To Fall In Love
2018	The Ready Set	V1	Life In Pink
2018	The Ready Set	V1	Real
2018	The Ready Set	V1	Let U Go
2018	The Ready Set	V2	Stitch
2018	Animal Island	Animalistic	Imagine All You Can Do
2018	The Mowglis	I was Starting to Wonder	I Feel Good About This
2018	Cade Foehner		Breathe Out
2018	Vanessa Mai	Schlager	Vergessen dich zu vergessen
2018	Set it Off	Midnight	Lonely Dance
2019	Saint PHYNX		Sorry
2019	Onlychild	solstice, part 2.	Royal Blue
2019	Derek Hough		Say It Now
2019	Dreamers	Launch Fly Land	Dizzy
2019	Mannequin Online		So Cool
2019	Little Hurt		It's Okay Not To Be Okay
2020	Set it Off	After Midnight	So Predictable
2020	Animal Fiction		Like I Do
2020	Animal Fiction	Start Again	
2020	Em Rossi		The Other Side
2020	The Veil	Batwoman Soundtrack	Welcome To My World
2020	Paper Jackets		Drugs & Honey
2020	Onlychild		Thank Me Later
2020	Little Hurt	Every Second	My Head Hurts
2021	Future Coyote		Get To Work
2021	Little Luna		therapy
2021	Little Hurt	Every Second	I Don't Wanna Be Here
2021	Future Coyote		Coming Alive
2021	Trans Violet		Blue Flowers
2021	Casey Abrams		To Me, From Me
2021	TALKBAK	TALKBAK	Gimme Something Good Jump Fire Yng4Evr
2021	Young Rising Sons		Carousel
2021	Dreamers		Brainless
2021	Riivels		Ain't Seen Nothing Yet
2021	Animal Fiction	Eyes To The Sun	Ready 2 Go Find Our Way Everywhere We Go Eyes To The Sun Take Me Higher Permanent Vacation
2021	Seventeen	Attacca	Rock With You
2021	Set It Off		Skeleton
2021	Alex Di Leo	Following Feelings	

Features
Year	Artist	Songs
2014	tyDi	Apollo
2015	Wish I Was	Cutting Ties Now I Know End Of Faith
2016	Wish I Was	We're Better Than This Stop This The Bubble Kill Me We Can't Go On Like This I Want To Believe
2016	tyDi	Sharpest Weapon All I Ever Knew
2017	Wish I Was	This Could Be It?
2018	Animal Island	New Classic All You Can Do
2018	tyDi	Everything I See
2020	Animal Island	Undefined Live Loud
2020	American Teeth	Barred Out [Feat. Twin XL]
2021	LUNA AURA	Smile
