= I Will Be Nothing Without Your Love =

Studio album by The Ready Set
- Released: April 8, 2016
- Recorded: 2015–2016
- Genre: Electropop
- Label: Hopeless; ADA
- Producer: Jordan Witzigreuter

The Ready Set chronology
| The Bad & the Better (2014) | I Will Be Nothing Without Your Love (2016) | V1 (2018) |

Singles from I Will Be Nothing Without Your Love
- 1. "Good Enough" Released: February 5, 2016; 2. "Disappearing Act" Released: March 11, 2016

I Will Be Nothing Without Your Love is the fifth studio album by American electropop singer-songwriter The Ready Set. It was released on April 8, 2016, by Hopeless Records.

== Background ==
In 2015, Witzigreuter took a one-year hiatus from releasing music under the Ready Set to focus on his new side project, Nekokat. He cited "burn out" as the reason for taking a break from the Ready Set and that working on Nekokat helped motivate him to write songs again. In November 2015, the Ready Set signed with Hopeless Records. He began working on the album prior to being signed to the label. He spoke about signing with the label in an interview with Alternative Press.

"I think that being at Hopeless now is going to enable me to do things that I've wanted to do for a long time. In the past, it's been very single-oriented and all about radio campaigns. I feel like this time, it's going to be a little less of that and [more of] me being able to be more creative and put out things that I want to put out."

Witzigreuter stated that he was able to be a little more honest with the album and that it feels more like him. The album was influenced by happy tropical sound and features sadder lyrical themes according to Witzigreuter. By the end of 2015, Witzigreuter already finished producing and engineering the album in his home studio.

== Singles ==
Two singles were released from the album. "Good Enough" was released as the first single on February 5, 2016, along with its music video directed by Erik Rojas. A remix by Michael Brun was released on May 20, 2016, which led the song to have a bigger impact, reaching more than ten million streams on Spotify and peaked at number 40 on the US Dance/Mix Show Airplay chart. "Disappearing Act" was released as the second single on March 11, 2016, along the premiere of its music video, directed by Megan Thompson. "Swim" was released as a promotional single on March 31, 2016, before the album's arrival.

== Critical reception ==
Professional ratings
Review scores
| Source | Rating |
|---|---|
| AllMusic | 3.5/5 stars |
| idobi Radio | 10/10 stars |

I Will Be Nothing Without Your Love was met with generally positive reviews from music critics. Tim Sendra of AllMusic described Witzigreuter's work on the album as "carefully crafted arrangements like they were meant to be together forever, his lyrics touch on pain, but in a harmless, easy to swallow fashion, and the sleek production goes down smooth but never sounds plastic." He also stated that the album was The Ready Set's "most impressively Pop record yet." Emillie Marvel of idobi Radio called the album, "a fresh start built from past influences and life lessons." She praised Witzigreuter's ability to write "catchy melodies like nobody's business."

Amy Ebeling of Alternative Press stated, "although songs begin to blend into one another and certain hooks become repetitive over the span of the LP, I Will Be Nothing Without Your Love is well worth a listen." In a mixed review by Michael Smith of Renowned for Sound, he remarked, "while the fluffy synthpop style that dominates the album is endearing, it's a style that wears thin over the course of the album." Despite stating that the record is a "largely forgettable piece of work," he praised the track, "Good Enough" for its "tropical melodies and booming beats." Overall, he called the album a "far more mediocre release," that will "inevitably end up fading into the background with time."

== Track listing ==
All songs written and produced by Jordan Witzigreuter except where noted.

I Will Be Nothing Without Your Love
| No. | Title | Writer(s) | Length |
|---|---|---|---|
| 1. | "Disappearing Act" | Jordan Witzigreuter; Cameron Walker | 3:25 |
| 2. | "Being Afraid" | Witzigreuter; Mackenzie Thoms | 3:10 |
| 3. | "Good Enough" | Witzigreuter | 3:13 |
| 4. | "Concrete" | Witzigreuter; Walker | 3:15 |
| 5. | "I Will Be Nothing Without Your Love" | Witzigreuter | 4:05 |
| 6. | "Run with Me" | Witzigreuter; Walker | 3:21 |
| 7. | "Should We Go Downtown" | Witzigreuter; James Bairian; Louis Castle | 3:30 |
| 8. | "Swim" | Witzigreuter; Walker | 3:36 |
| 9. | "No Love" (featuring Ansley Newman of Jule Vera) | Witzigreuter; Jule Vera | 3:56 |
| 10. | "First" | Witzigreuter | 3:36 |
| 11. | "Fire in the Sky" | Witzigreuter | 4:37 |
| 12. | "See You" | Witzigreuter | 5:34 |

Target edition bonus tracks
| No. | Title | Writer(s) | Length |
|---|---|---|---|
| 13. | "Who's Gonna Drive You Home?" | | 3:16 |
| 14. | "Laugh It Off" | | 3:53 |
| 15. | "Time After Time" | Cyndi Lauper; Rob Hyman | 4:17 |

== Personnel ==
Credits for I Will Be Nothing Without Your Love adapted from AllMusic.

- Jordan Witzigreuter - engineer, producer
- James Bairian - composer
- Rick Carson - mastering, mixing
- Louis Castle - composer
- Brian Manley - artwork, layout
- Ansley Newman - featured artist
- Deryck Russel - mastering, mixing
- Evan Tetreault - photography
- Megan Thompson - photography
- Mackenzie Thoms - composer
- Cameron Walker - composer, guitar

== Charts ==
Chart performance for I Will Be Nothing Without Your Love
| Chart (2016) | Peak position |
|---|---|
| US Independent Albums (Billboard) | 24 |
