= La Source (album) =

Greatest hits album by Nâdiya
- Released: November 12, 2007
- Recorded: 2003–2007
- Genre: R&B, pop
- Length: 57:12
- Label: Columbia
- Producer: Electron libre

Nâdiya chronology
Nâdiya (2006)	La Source (2007)	Electron Libre (2008)

Singles from La Source
- 1. "Vivre ou survivre" Released: November 26, 2007

La Source (translated The Source) is the fourth album from the French R&B singer Nâdiya. The album was released on November 12, 2007, and is a hits compilation. In total, the album features 5 new songs, including the first single "Vivre ou survivre", and new versions of several songs from her previous two albums. No songs from her debut album Changer les Choses were included on the album.

== Track listing ==
#	Track	Length	Original Album	Additional Info.
1	"La Source (Slam)"	0:30		
2	"Vivre ou survivre"	3:50		Radio Edit
3	"Comment oublier"	4:05		duet with Jio
4	"Tous ces mots"	3:38	Nâdiya	feat. Smartzee / Radio Edit
5	"Amies-ennemies"	3:57	Nâdiya	Single Edit
6	"Corrida"	3:45		
7	"El Hamdoulilah"	4:02	Nâdiya	
8	"Et c'est parti..."	4:55	16/9	feat. Smartzee / Extended Version
9	"Roc"	3:36	Nâdiya	
10	"Cheyenne"	3:34	Nâdiya	Squal Mix
11	"Si loin de vous"	4:26	16/9	Extended Mix
12	"À mon père"	3:32		duet with Idir / Version Acoustique
13	"Parle-moi"	5:08	16/9	Extended Mix
14	"Signes"	3:41	16/9	Extended Radio Mix
15	"Inch'allah"	4:33	Nâdiya	

== Charts, certifications and sales ==
The album debuted at number 35 in the French charts upon release. After that, it kept on lowering in chart positions, leaving the top 100 within four weeks.

Chart	Country	Provider(s)	Peak position	Certification	Sales/shipments
French Albums Chart	France	SNEP	35	—	
