= L'histoire en 16/9 =

Video by Nâdiya
- Released: 4 April 2005
- Genre: R&B, pop
- Length: over 60 minutes
- Label: Sony BMG

L'histoire en 16/9 is Nâdiya's first music DVD. The DVD came with a bonus CD. 2 months after its release, it was certified platinum by SNEP, meaning over 300,000 copies were sold of the DVD.

== Features ==
- DVD
1. Video documentary "L'histoire" – 41:43
2. Biography – 6:15
3. The Making of Nâdiya – 30:38
4. "Parle-moi" [music video] – 4:06
5. "Et c'est parti..." [music video] – 3:53
6. "Si loin de vous" [music video] – 4:07
7. "Signes" [music video] – 3:40
8. "Chaque fois" [music video] – 4:55
9. "J'ai confiance en toi" [music video] – 3:50
10. Photo gallery – 4:30
11. Teaser of Nâdiya – 4:24
12. Link to Official website

Bonus CD

1. "Lady Marmalade (Voulez vous coucher avec moi?)" –
2. "What a Feeling (Flashdance)" – 4:12
3. "Parle-moi" [6mondini remix] – 5:00
4. "Et c'est parti..." [6mondini remix] – 4:59
5. "Si loin de vous" [6mondini remix] – 5:33
6. "Signes" [6mondini remix] – 6:00
7. "Megamix" ("Parle-moi", "Et c'est parti...", "Si loin de vous", "Signes") – 3:57
