= Ringside (band) =

Indie rock band from Hollywood, California

- Origin: Hollywood, California, United States
- Genres: Indie rock
- Years active: 2005–present
- Labels: Flawless Records, Geffen Records, Ringside, Inc. (independent)
- Members: Scott Thomas; Balthazar Getty

Ringside is an indie rock band from Hollywood, California, originally formed in Los Angeles. They specialize in fusing indie rock with electronic beats. The band consists of Scott Thomas (vocals, guitar, and keyboard), Kirk Hellie (guitarist), Sandy Chila (live drums), Max Allyn (live keys), and actor Balthazar Getty, who doubles as a beatmaker and producer.

Their debut album Ringside was released in 2005, under Fred Durst's label Flawless Records and Geffen Records, with the track "Tired of Being Sorry" being the first single off the album. The song was later covered by singer/songwriter Enrique Iglesias on his eighth album Insomniac and was released as a single in Europe. A further version of the cover by Iglesias, featuring Nâdiya, was a chart success, including topping the French singles chart in 2008. Also the same song, "Tired of Being Sorry" was featured on the movie Her Minor Thing. The song "Struggle" from their self-titled album was featured on a Pontiac Torrent commercial, the movie Doom and on the TV series Six Feet Under. The track also appeared briefly on the ambient play list of the Schecter Guitars website.

The album, Lost Days was released on January 25, 2011. The song "Money" was featured in the movie Magic Mike.

== Discography ==
=== Albums ===
- Ringside (2005)
- Money EP (2010)
- Lost Days (2011)
- Fiend For You (2015)

=== Singles ===
- "Tired of Being Sorry"
- "Struggle"
- "Criminal"
- "Money"
- "Lost Days"
