= Nâdiya (album) =

Studio album by Nâdiya
- Released: June 5, 2006
- Recorded: 2005–2006
- Genre: R&B, pop, dance-pop, hip hop, pop rock
- Length: 49:58
- Label: Columbia

Nâdiya chronology
16/9 (2004)	Nâdiya (2006)	La Source (2007)

Singles from Nâdiya
- 1. "Tous ces mots" Released: February 24, 2006; 2. "Roc" Released: June 19, 2006; 3. "Amies-ennemies" Released: October 30, 2006

Professional ratings
Review scores
Source	Rating
Fnac	link (in French)

Nâdiya is the third studio album from Algerian-French R&B singer Nâdiya. The album was released on June 5, 2006 in France. Also, a DVD with a runtime of 26 minutes was released with it containing interviews and a "The Making of The Album" documentary.

== Album information ==
The lead single from the album, "Tous ces mots" ("All These Words"), peaked at number 2 in the French singles chart. The song was released in February 2006 and features Smartzee, who is also featured in her 2004 single "Et c'est parti..." ("Here We Go"). The second single, "Roc" ("Rock"), was released on June 19 in France, also entering and peaking the French Singles Top 100 at number 2 and stayed there for four consecutive weeks. It became her longest running single in the top ten, being 11 weeks in the top 10 (as well as in the top 5). "Amies-ennemies" was chosen to be the third single from the album and debuted at number four in France. The singles were less successful in Switzerland, where they all were released too. They all managed to peak within the top 40, but none of them charted in the top 20.

The album entered the French Album Top 200 at number one in the same week it was released. It then slowly descended in positions, dropping to number 2, then 3, 4 and 5. It spent a total of nine weeks in the top 10 and (as of February 10) 35 weeks in the top 100. It has been certified platinum for sales over 300,000 in France by SNEP.

In the country's album year-end chart, Nâdiya peaked at number 34. As of June 22, the album is the 272nd best-performing album in the chart history of France, with the preceding album 16/9 peaking at number 96.

Two weeks prior to its release, "Roc" had peaked at #2 (with Shakira's Hips Don't Lie being #1) in Virgin Mega.fr's Top 100 singles.

The album is the first Nâdiya album to debut at the top position in France. It is also her first album to reach the number one position in France.

SNEP revealed the best-selling singles during the first quarter of 2006 (from January 1 - March 31, 2006). Despite being released four weeks before the first quarter of 2006 ended, the "Tous ces mots" single managed the song to peak at number thirteen.

== Track listing ==
1. "Tous ces mots" (featuring Smartzee) (Géraldine Delacoux/Thierry Gronfier) – 3:37
2. "Au coeur de la rue" (Géraldine Delacoux/Mehdy Bousaïd/Bustafunk) – 3:41
3. "Roc" (Géraldine Delacoux/Mehdy Bousaïd/Thierry Gronfier) – 3:39
4. "Dharma" (Mehdy Bousaïd/Bustafunk/Laura Marciano) – 4:14
5. "L'appel ("El Hamdoulilah" Intro)" – 0:34
6. "El Hamdoulilah" (Laura Mayne-Kerbrat) – 4:03
7. "Amies-ennemies" (Géraldine Delacoux/Thierry Gronfier/Frédéric Chopin) – 3:47
8. "Flashback" (featuring Zo) (Géraldine Delacoux/Mehdy Bousaïd/Zoheir Mokeddem) – 3:23
9. "Cette planète (Intro)" – 0:09
10. "Cette planète" (Mehdy Boussaïd/Pena Lobaton Ulises/Franck Rougier) – 3:13
11. "Au nom des tiens" (featuring S.T.A.) (Mehdy Boussaïd/Franck Rougier) – 3:23
12. "Cheyenne" (Géraldine Delacoux/FBcool/SDO) – 3:28
13. "L'enfant qu'on envoie se coucher" – 0:37
14. "Inch'allah" (René DeWael/Géraldine Delacoux/Nâdiya) – 4:31
15. "Rêves d'enfants" (Mehdy Boussaïd/Franck Rougier) – 2:46
16. "Emmène-moi" (Géraldine Delacoux/Mehdy Bousaïd/Zoheir Mokeddem) – 3:58
17. "Mektoub" [outro] – 0:50
18. "Roc" [video] [bonus]

Disc 2 (only CD/DVD release)

1. Documentaire réalisé par Julien Bloch
2. "Tous ces mots" [video]

== Chart performance ==
Chart (2006)	Peak position
French Albums Chart	1
Swiss Albums Chart	14
Belgian (Flanders) Albums Chart	34
Belgian (Wallonia) Albums Chart	4

== Certifications ==
Certifications for Nâdiya
Region	Certification	Certified units/sales
France (SNEP)	Platinum	300,000^{*}
^{*} Sales figures based on certification alone.
