= Électron Libre =

Studio album by Nâdiya
- Released: December 5, 2008
- Recorded: 2008
- Length: 44:55
- Languages: French; English
- Label: Columbia

Nâdiya chronology
La Source (2007)	Électron Libre (2008)

Singles from Nâdiya
- 1. "Tired of Being Sorry (Laisse le destin l'emporter)" Released: March 31, 2008; 2. "No Future in the Past" Released: November 2008; 3. "J'irai jusque là" Released: 2009

Électron Libre is the fourth studio album (fifth overall) from the French R&B singer Nâdiya. The album was released on December 5, 2008 in France.

== Album information ==
The lead single released off the album, "No Future in the Past", became her first single that did not enter the French singles chart. The song was released in November 2008, after being sent to radios in September. Although "Tired of Being Sorry (Laisse le destin l'emporter)" also appears on the album, it is not considered as the lead single from the album. The track, which is a duet with Latin singer Enrique Iglesias, did become her first chart-topping hit in France, being number one for eleven weeks, later to be confirmed as the best-selling single of 2008. The second single, the ballad "J'irai jusque là" ("I'll Go As Far As There"), originally written and recorded by French musician Gilles Luka under the title "Just Because You Lied", was released in early 2009.

== Track listing ==
No.	Title	Writer(s)	Length
1.	"J’irai jusque là" (Just Because You Lied)	Gilles Luka	3:24
2.	"Voler tes rêves" (featuring Stephen Simmonds)		4:06
3.	"Tired of Being Sorry (Laisse le destin l’importer)" (featuring Enrique Iglesias)		4:35
4.	"No Future in the Past" (featuring Kelly Rowland)		3:27
5.	"Miss You" (featuring Enrique Iglesias)		3:56
6.	"Orpheline de l’amour"		3:58
7.	"Ma résilience"		3:46
8.	"À mon père" (acoustic version - featuring Idir)		3:34
9.	"Il suffit d’un mot"		2:56
10.	"La lettre"		3:28
11.	"Mon kiss à oxygène"		3:43
12.	"Jamais"		3:09
13.	"Solitaire"		0:59
Total length:			45:01

== Guest musicians ==
- Stephen Simmonds on "Voler tes rêves"
- Enrique Iglesias on "Tired of Being Sorry (Laisse le destin l'emporter)" and "Miss You"
- Kelly Rowland on "No Future in the Past"
- Idir on "À mon pere" (acoustic version)

== Chart performance ==
Chart (2008)	Peak position
Belgian (Walloon) Albums Chart	61
French Albums Chart	69

== Sales ==
Country	Certification	Physical Sales
France	—	8,270 in 2008.
