= Vivre ou survivre =

Vivre ou survivre may refer to:

- Vivre ou survivre (Daniel Balavoine song), 1982
- Vivre ou survivre (Nâdiya song), 2007
