= Stephen Simmonds =

Swedish recording artist (born 1975)

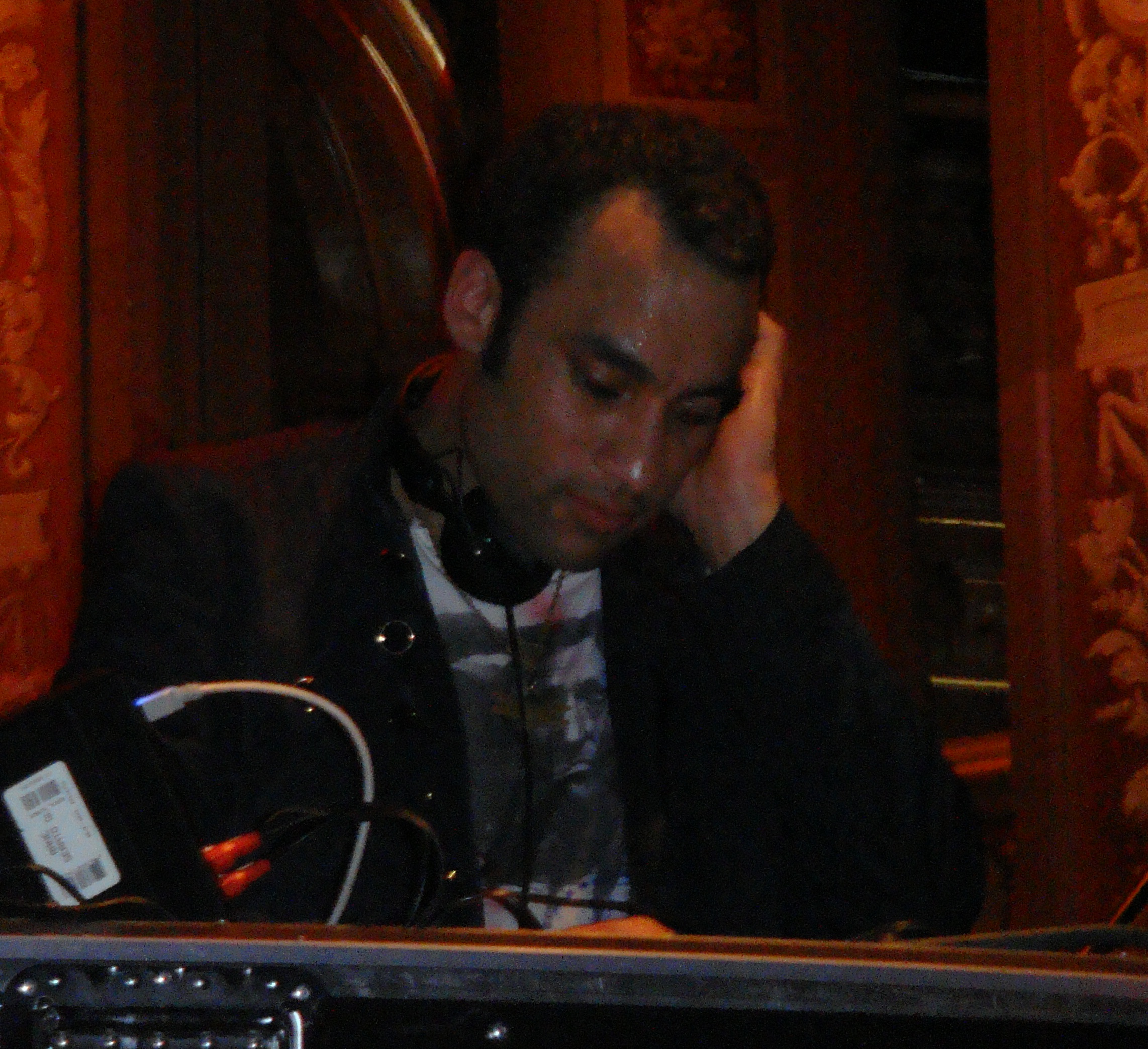
- Stephen Simmonds DJing live at Berns Salonger.

Background information
- Born: Stephen Guy Simmonds; 26 June 1975 (age 51); Täby, Sweden
- Origin: Stockholm, Sweden
- Genres: Soul, alternative rock, R&B, pop
- Occupations: Singer, songwriter
- Years active: 1995–present
- Labels: Parlophone/EMI Music, Priority Records, Diesel Music/Sony, SuperStudio
- Website: stephensimmonds.com

Stephen Guy Simmonds is a Swedish recording artist born in Täby, Sweden, 26 June 1975. Born to a Jamaican father, a musician by profession, and a Swedish mother, he was raised in Sweden, the United States, and Israel.

He studied at Adolf Fredrik's Music School and Södra Latin Music School, both in Stockholm, Sweden. After recording a demo with Swedish producer Peter Cartriers, Simmonds signed record deals with Parlophone/EMI in the UK and Priority Records in the United States. His first album, Alone, was released later that year, and was nominated for five Grammys. Alone was re-mixed and renamed Spirit Tales for his UK and US release. In 1997, Simmonds had his breakthrough with the hit "Tears Never Dry" a duet with Lisa Nilsson that proved his biggest single hit.

Since Alone/Spirit Tales, he has released three more albums: For Father in 2002, This Must Be Ground in 2004 and, after a long hiatus, Anomie in 2010.

== In popular culture ==
- In 2003, his song "Where Is My Love" was used as a soundtrack for the Swedish film Rånarna.
- He appeared as a guest singer on Nâdiya' song "Voles tes rêves" (meaning: Steal Your Dreams), which can be found on her 2008 album Électron Libre.
- In winter 2009–2010, he appeared in the Swedish TV comedy series Cirkus Möller broadcast on TV4.

== Discography ==
=== Studio albums ===
Date of Release	Title	Peak position SWE	Label
1997	Alone (title as released in Sweden and Japan)	8	Superstudio/Diesel Music
1998 / 2000	Spirit Tales (alternative release title for Alone in UK and USA)	N/A	Parlophone/EMI (UK) Priority/EMI (US)
2002	For Father	32	Diesel Music/Sony
2004–2005	This Must Be Ground	20	For Father Recordings
2010	Anomie	–	For Father Recordings

=== Singles ===
Year	Single	Chart peak (SWE)	Certification	Album
1997	"Tears Never Dry" (with Lisa Nilsson) (UK #77)	9		Alone
2004	"Where's My Love"	18		This Must Be Ground

Other singles (non-charting)

- 1997: "All the People"
- 1997: "Alone"
- 1998: "Now's the Time"
- 1998: "Get Down" (UK #83)
- 2000: "I Can't Do That"
- 2003: "Let Me Touch"
- 2003: "For Father" (with Dilba)
- 2004: "Louder"
- 2010: "Adiyeah (Give People What They Want)"
- 2010: "Just Love"
