= Parle-moi =

Parle-moi may refer to:

- "Parle-moi" (Isabelle Boulay song), a 2000 single by Isabelle Boulay
- "Parle-moi" (Nâdiya song), a 2004 single by Nâdiya
- "Parle-moi", a 2005 single by Jean-Louis Aubert
