= Push (Enrique Iglesias song) =

Single by Enrique Iglesias featuring Lil Wayne

from the album Insomniac
- Released: 14 February 2008
- Recorded: 2007
- Genre: R&B; hip hop
- Length: 4:06
- Label: Interscope
- Songwriters: Enrique Iglesias; Steve Morales; Adonis; Lil Wayne
- Producer: Steven Morales

Enrique Iglesias singles chronology
"Tired of Being Sorry" (2007)	"Push" (2008)	"¿Dónde Están Corazón?" (2008)

Lil Wayne singles chronology
"I'm Me" (2007)	"Push" (2008)	"Lollipop" (2008)

Alternative cover

Music video
- "Enrique Iglesias - Push ft. Lil Wayne" on YouTube

"Push" is a song from the Enrique Iglesias album Insomniac. The song features American rapper Lil Wayne and is Iglesias's first collaboration with a hip-hop artist.

== History ==
Push was to be the second single from Iglesias's album Insomniac; several articles about the album cited it as the second single and it was confirmed by Iglesias in several interviews. The song was put on Iglesias's official Myspace, was sent to several clubs, and was played during a broadcast on KTLA. Two different versions of the song leaked onto the Internet, an instrumental and an a cappella version that featured an extended rap from Lil Wayne. The first signs that the song would not be released came during an appearance by Iglesias on MTV's Total Request Live. The singer stated that either "Push" or "Somebody's Me" would be the next single for the US. During a phone interview with KRQQ in Tucson, Arizona, Iglesias stated that "Somebody's Me" would be the second US single from Insomniac.

The full version of Lil Wayne's rap was used in a remix of Britney Spears's song "Gimme More". Despite it not being an official remix, it was mistakenly viewed as such by magazines such as Blender and received much exposure throughout the Internet. A poll on Iglesias's MySpace had "Push" come second place to his 2001 hit "Hero" in a list of songs to be added to the music player. Shortly after, Iglesias's management decided to test the song on a number of radio stations throughout the US. A list of the eleven radio stations where the song has been added appeared on both Iglesias's official website as well as his MySpace. The song has once again been added to Iglesias Myspace page. The song was officially confirmed as the third US single on both Iglesias's website and his Myspace page. The song was added to the soundtrack to the movie Step Up 2: The Streets. The version that appears on the film soundtrack does not feature Lil Wayne but rather Iglesias on his own. A limited release of the album did however feature a San Francisco-based rapper called Prophet. It was both these versions that were to be released to as singles. Iglesias debuted the version of the song with Prophet on Ryan Seacrest's radio show on KIIS-FM on 6 February. The same week, Iglesias performed the song on Live with Regis and Kelly and The Tonight Show, promoting the Step Up 2: The Streets soundtrack. The song debuted on Billboard's Pop 100 chart at 86. The song's video was rejected by MTV due to its explicitness, with the music station asking for a less gratuitous re-edit. The song and video were supposed to go for adds on radio and premiere on MTV on 14 February but that did not happen. The song was also removed from the list of official singles from the Step Up 2: The Streets soundtrack, suggesting the song was to no longer be a single. The music video did eventually premiere on Yahoo! Music on 29 February, though it differed from previews of the video lacking intercut clips from the movie and the audio included Lil Wayne's vocals despite him not being in the original video. The video has so far only been aired on the channel Mun2 on a week dedicated to Iglesias. It has also aired on some foreign television channels. The original version which features Wayne features on some foreign versions of Iglesias's Greatest Hits album as well as being a bonus track on the digital release of Greatest Hits on the U.S. iTunes Store.

== Music video ==
The music video was directed by Billy Woodruff and features both Iglesias and the Step Up 2: The Streets main actors Robert Hoffman and Briana Evigan reprising their roles in an underground club setting. A preview of the video was put on Channing Tatum's YouTube channel. Short clips were also shown during Iglesias' appearance on Regis and Kelly and Rachael Ray, which featured clips of the movie with the audio of the soundtrack version of the song. When the full video appeared on Yahoo! as well as on Universal Music's account the movie clips were no longer present and the audio was from Iglesias's album version with Lil Wayne.

The video begins with actors Hoffman and Evigan enticing each other down a hallway and entering a private room where they start to romantically interact. Iglesias follows them into a room where the couple hand him a camcorder and he records the two of them as they make out and caress each other. At the end of the video, when the recording session is over, he removes the memory card from the camcorder, hands it to the couple and walks away. Another part of the video has Iglesias sitting down watching an erotic dancer, played by model Katrina Rafidi, separated from him by a glass wall. As the video goes on he tries to get to her; the climax of the video has Iglesias picking up his chair and shattering the glass, uniting both him and his dancer. The entire video is intercut with shots of Iglesias in the middle of a crowd of dancers as he performs the song to camera. Also, although Lil Wayne is not shown during the video, his verse is still heard.

A second version of the video featuring the rapper Prophet has appeared on the Internet. The original video is intercut with shots of a television screen mounted on the club wall showing Prophet rapping.

== Track listing ==
Digital download

1. "Push" (No Rap Version) - 3:28

== Charts ==
Chart (2007)	Peak position
Bulgaria Top 100	34
Romanian Top 100	3
Turkish Top 20 Chart	10
Russia (TopHit)	82
Slovakia Top 100	91
U.S. Billboard Pop 100	86

=== Certifications and sales ===
Country	Certification	Date	Sales certified
Russia	2×Platinum	14 Feb 2008	400,000

== Release history ==
Release dates and formats for "Push"
Region	Date	Format	Label	Ref.
France	February 2008	Digital download	Universal	
Russia	May 15, 2008	Contemporary hit radio	Universal	
