= 16/9 =

16/9 may refer to:

- September 16
- 16:9 aspect ratio
- 16/9 (album), 2004 album by Nâdiya

== See also ==
- 16×9, Canadian TV series
