= Insomniac (Enrique Iglesias album) =

Studio album by Enrique Iglesias
- Released: 11 June 2007
- Recorded: 2006–2007
- Genre: Pop
- Length: 58:01
- Label: Interscope
- Producer: Arnthor Birgisson; Sean Garrett; Enrique Iglesias (also exec.); Jimmy Iovine (exec.); Brian Kidd; Martin Kierszenbaum (exec.); Kristian Lundin; Mark Taylor; Steve Morales; Carlos Paucar; John Shanks; Stargate; Brodie Stewart; Scott Thomas; Rami Yacoub

Enrique Iglesias chronology
7 (2003)	Insomniac (2007)	Enrique Iglesias: 95/08 Éxitos (2008)

Singles from Insomniac
- 1. "Do You Know? / Dímelo" Released: 15 May 2007; 2. "Somebody's Me / Alguien Soy Yo" Released: 8 August 2007; 3. "Tired of Being Sorry" Released: 14 September 2007; 4. "Push" Released: 14 February 2008

Insomniac is the eighth studio album, and fourth English-language album, released by Spanish singer Enrique Iglesias. The album is the first of Iglesias's English releases since 7 (2003), which was deemed a commercial failure. Insomniac contains Iglesias' first collaboration with a rapper - Lil Wayne - on the song "Push," as well as a cover of indie rock band Ringside's "Tired of Being Sorry". It was released worldwide on 11 June 2007 and in the USA on 12 June 2007.

== Background and composition ==
"Sometimes I take a pill to sleep, or two or six. But I guess that is the way it goes - when you put three years into making an album, you also become a bit of an insomniac. I have always been more of a night person. I never lay vocals onto any song before eight or nine at night. I always work at night. I go to the studio at six or seven in the evening and leave again at six in the morning. So in a way the album was done by night."

— Enrique Iglesias told to Insider about recording the album.

The title "Insomniac" is a reference to the fact that Iglesias says he often takes sleeping pills to get a good night's rest. Iglesias recorded most of the album in the evening and early hours of the morning, writing more than 50 songs before settling on 12 that he felt were strong enough to put on the album.

Insomniac features "Miss You", which is dedicated to his girlfriend, former tennis star Anna Kournikova, as well as a track, "Push", which he performs with rapper Lil' Wayne—a departure from his usual material. The first single, "Do You Know", has become known as the "ping pong song" because of its ping-pong ball-sampling beat. There is also a cover of indie pop band Ringside's "Tired of Being Sorry".

== Critical reception ==
Professional ratings
Review scores
Source	Rating
AllMusic	2.5/5 stars
BBC Music	positive
Entertainment.ie	1/5 stars
Entertainment Weekly	C
Houston Chronicle	3/4 stars
Slant Magazine	2.5/5 stars
USA Today	2.5/4 stars

Allmusic reviewer Stephen Thomas Erlewine gave the album 2.5 out of 5 stars, writing: "'Insomniac' is pushed to a younger audience. But Enrique is too much of a crossover guy to spend the entire album doing the nasty. Sometimes, he pushes too hard in either direction, but sometimes Iglesias strikes the right balance between crossover pop and stylish retro-new wave production. What works on this slick, snazzy makeover is what always works for him: the ballads and the middle-of-the-road pop tunes. They may not be hip, but they're part of the family tradition, and when he sticks to them, he's as good as ever." Lauren Murphy from Entertainment.ie criticized the songs, writing: "Every track here is either a sombre, mumbled, slow-moving number that sounds dated and cumbersome, cheesy radio-friendly dirges that have been done a million times before and better or are just so amateur-sounding that they're embarrassing." Jonathan Bernstein from Entertainment Weekly wrote "Insomniac sees Iglesias possessed by the vengeful spirit of Toad the Wet Sprocket ("Stay Here Tonight"), outshone by Lil Wayne on the plodding club banger Push, and, yes, upstaged by a sampled Ping-Pong ball on Do You Know? (The Ping Pong Song)."

Jerome Blakeney from BBC Music gave the album a positive review, stating that "[Iglesias] remains the king of Latin-tinged heart-tugging and at least half of this album keeps him firmly on top." Joey Guerra from Houston Chronicle also gave to the album a positive review, writing: "Insomniac's secret weapons, however, are its ballads, which cast Iglesias as – of course – a sensitive, soulful Spanish lover." Scott Shelter wrote for Slant Magazine that "The ballads are disappointing because the rest of Insomniac isn't half bad, and if all of the ballads were like the acoustic 'Don't You Forget About Me', Insomniac would've been worthwhile effort; instead, it's a case study in ironic album titles."

== Commercial performance ==
The album debuted at number 17 on the Billboard 200 chart, with 45,000 copies sold. The previous album, 2003's 7, however, began at number 31, but with 77,000 copies. It entered the UK charts at number 3 and went on to be certified Gold. The album went Platinum (or multiplatinum) in countries such as Ireland, Russia and Poland.

== Track listing ==
Credits adapted from the liner notes of Insomniac.

Insomniac — North American standard version
No.	Title	Writer(s)	Producer(s)	Length
1.	"Ring My Bells"	Enrique Iglesias; Kristian Lundin; Savan Kotecha	Lundin	3:55
2.	"Push" (featuring Lil Wayne)	Iglesias; Steve Morales; Adonis; Lil Wayne	Morales; Carlos Paucar^{[a]}; Iglesias^{[a]}	3:52
3.	"Do You Know? (The Ping Pong Song)"	Sean Garrett; Brian Kidd; Iglesias	Garrett; Kidd; Paucar^{[a]}; Iglesias^{[a]}	3:38
4.	"Somebody's Me"	Iglesias; John Shanks; Kara DioGuardi	Shanks	3:58
5.	"On Top of You"	Johnta Austin; Mikkel Storleer Eriksen; Tor Erik Hermansen; Iglesias; Hallgeir Rustan	StarGate	3:39
6.	"Tired of Being Sorry"	Scott Thomas	Thomas; Paucar^{[a]}; Iglesias^{[a]}	4:01
7.	"Miss You"	Iglesias; Rami Yacoub; Arnthor Birgisson	Rami; Arnthor	3:21
8.	"Wish I Was Your Lover"	Iglesias; Yacoub; Birgisson	Rami; Arnthor	3:25
9.	"Little Girl"	Iglesias; Paul Barry; Mark Taylor	Taylor	3:46
10.	"Stay Here Tonight"	Iglesias; Shanks; DioGuardi	Shanks	4:13
11.	"Sweet Isabel"	Brodie Stewart	Stewart; Paucar^{[a]}; Iglesias^{[a]}	3:13
12.	"Don't You Forget About Me"	Iglesias; Barry; Taylor	Taylor	3:11
13.	"Dímelo" (Spanish version of "Do You Know?")	Garrett; Kidd; Iglesias; Luis Gómez-Escolar	Paucar; Iglesias	3:38
14.	"Alguien Soy Yo" (Spanish version of "Somebody's Me")	Iglesias; Shanks; DioGuardi; Gómez-Escolar	Paucar; Iglesias	3:59
15.	"Amigo Vulnerable" (Spanish version of "Tired of Being Sorry")	Thomas; Gómez-Escolar	Paucar; Iglesias	4:01
Total length:				55:50

Insomniac — International version (bonus track)
No.	Title	Writer(s)	Producer(s)	Length
16.	"Hero" (Thunderpuss edit)	Iglesias; Barry; Taylor	Taylor; Chris Cox^{[b]}; Barry Harris^{[b]}	3:20

Insomniac — European Special Edition (bonus tracks)
No.	Title	Writer(s)	Producer(s)	Length
16.	"Hero" (Thunderpuss edit)	Iglesias; Barry; Taylor	Taylor; Cox^{[b]}; Harris^{[b]}	3:20
17.	"Not in Love" (Armand van Helden club mix)	Iglesias; Barry; Taylor; Fernando Garibay	Taylor; van Helden^{[b]}; Iglesias^{[c]}; Garibay^{[c]}	9:13

Insomniac — Russian re-issue version (bonus tracks)
No.	Title	Writer(s)	Producer(s)	Length
16.	"Hero" (Thunderpuss edit)	Iglesias; Barry; Taylor	Taylor; Cox^{[b]}; Harris^{[b]}	3:20
17.	"Can You Hear Me"	Iglesias; Morales; Frankie Storm	Morales; Raymond Sarom Diaz^{[d]}	3:44

Notes

- ^{^[a]} signifies a vocal producer
- ^{^[b]} signifies a remixer
- ^{^[c]} signifies a co-producer
- ^{^[d]} signifies an additional producer

== Charts ==
=== Weekly ===
Chart (2007)	Peak position
Australian Albums Top 50	44
Austrian Albums Top 75	14
Belgian (Flanders) Albums Chart	38
Belgian (Wallonia) Albums Chart	47
Danish Albums Top 40	5
Dutch Top 100 Albums Charts	6
Finnish Albums Top 40	16
French Albums Top 150	36
German Albums (Offizielle Top 100)	14
Hungarian Albums (MAHASZ)	31
Irish Albums (IRMA)	16
Italian Top 100 Albums Chart	43
Mexican Top 100 Albums Chart	4
Mexican International Top 20 Albums	1
Polish ZPAV/OLiS Albums Chart	13
South African Albums (RISA)	5
Spanish Top 100 Albums Chart	8
Swedish Top 60 Albums Charts	24
Swiss Albums Top 100	8
UK Top 200 Albums Chart	3
US Billboard Top 200 Albums	17

=== Year-end ===
Chart (2007)	Rank
Dutch Albums (Album Top 100)	26
Swiss Albums (Schweizer Hitparade)	57

Chart (2008)	Rank
Belgian Albums (Ultratop Flanders)	100
French Albums (SNEP)	179

== Certifications and sales ==
Region	Certification	Certified units/sales
Ireland (IRMA)	Platinum	15,000^{^}
Netherlands (NVPI)	Gold	35,000^{^}
Poland (ZPAV)	Gold	10,000^{*}
Russia (NFPF)	5× Platinum	100,000^{*}
United Kingdom (BPI)	Gold	100,000^{^}
^{*} Sales figures based on certification alone.^{^} Shipments figures based on certification alone.

== Release history ==
Region	Date	Version
United Kingdom	11 June 2007	Original
United States	12 June 2007	Original
Japan	16 June 2007	Original
France	8 July 2008	Nouvelle Edition
Europe	8 July 2008	Reissue
United Kingdom	11 July 2008	Reissue
