= For Father =

2002 album by Stephen Simmonds

Studio album by Stephen Simmonds
- Released: 2002
- Genre: Soul pop, R&B
- Label: Diesel Music/Sony Music

Stephen Simmonds chronology
Alone (Spirit Tales) (1997-2000)	For Father (2002)	This Must Be Ground (2004)

For Father is the second album by Stephen Simmonds.

== Track listing ==
1. Beautiful Day/Nevermind
2. Where Is Your Heart
3. Let Me Touch 04: For Father
4. I Can't Do That
5. Always In My Head
6. America To Africa
7. The Love Is Gone
8. I Miss You
9. If I Was Your Man
10. More To Do

== Singles ==
- I Can't Do That
- Let Me Touch
- For Father
