= Amies-ennemies =

Single by Nâdiya

from the album Nâdiya
- B-side: "Cette planète"
- Released: October 30, 2006
- Recorded: 2006
- Genre: Pop, R&B
- Length: 3:47
- Label: Columbia
- Songwriters: Géraldine Delacoux, Thierry Gronfier, Frédéric Chopin

Nâdiya singles chronology
"Roc" (2006)	"Amies-ennemies" (2006)	"Vivre ou survivre" (2007)

Music video
- "Amies-ennemies" on YouTube

Waltz in C-sharp minor performed by Luke Faulkner

"Amies-ennemies" is a song recorded by the French R&B singer Nâdiya. It was released as the third single from her third studio album, Nâdiya, on October 30, 2006. The song is harmonically based on the second theme of Frédéric Chopin's Waltz Op. 64, No. 2. It was a top five hit in France and Belgium (Wallonia).

== Music video ==
The song appears to be re-recorded or remixed for the video, as the song starts with a slightly different rhythm and the video version begins with the chorus instead of the first verse like the album version. There are more small differences, like the shout when the second verse begins, the a cappella part almost at the end of the video version and when she sings "l'autres ennemies" ('the other enemies'), is also different from the album version.

The video starts by showing a phonograph player, literally sampling the original Chopin waltz, next showing Nâdiya sitting on a couch putting on 'closed headphones'. Cuts of some children on ballet are also shown - throughout the whole video. When the first verse begins, Nâdiya is dancing in some sort of room with only a ventilator behind her. More scenes of the two friends are shown (one representing Nâdiya probably). At the chorus, we see Nâdiya with her background dancers performing a choreography for the song. Meanwhile, the two friends are having an argument and split from each other on the beach. At last, there is a party going on in Nâdiya's apartment with all of her friends being there. The video ends with Nâdiya picking up the phone and answering "C'est Nâdiya" ('Nâdiya here').

== Chart performance ==
It charted and peaked at number four in France for two weeks. The song has become her longest-running solo single in the French singles chart, being in it for 29 weeks. The record was previously held by her former single "Roc", which was in it for 24 weeks. Later, this record was broken by the Enrique Iglesias duet "Tired of Being Sorry (Laisse le destin l'emporter)", in it for 46 weeks.

== Track listings ==
Digital download (September 25, 2006)

1. "Amies-ennemies" – 3:43

CD single (October 30, 2006)

1. "Amies-ennemies" – 3:43
2. "Cètte planète" – 3:13
3. "Amies-ennemies" [a cappella]
4. "Amies-ennemies" [video]

== Charts ==
=== Weekly charts ===
Chart (2006–07)	Peak position
Belgium (Ultratop 50 Wallonia)	3
CIS Airplay (TopHit)	2
France (SNEP)	4
France Digital (SNEP)	5
Russia Airplay (TopHit)	2
Switzerland (Schweizer Hitparade)	40

=== Year-end charts ===
Chart (2006)	Position
Belgium (Ultratop 50 Wallonia)	61
France (SNEP)	34
Chart (2007)	Position
CIS (Tophit)	36
France (SNEP)	79
Russia Airplay (TopHit)	33

=== Decade-end charts ===
Decade-end chart performance for "Amies-ennemies"
Chart (2000–2009)	Position
Russia Airplay (TopHit)	127

== Certifications ==
Certifications for "Amies-ennemies"
Region	Certification	Certified units/sales
France (SNEP)	Silver	100,000^{*}
^{*} Sales figures based on certification alone.
