= Yésica Toscanini =

Argentine model

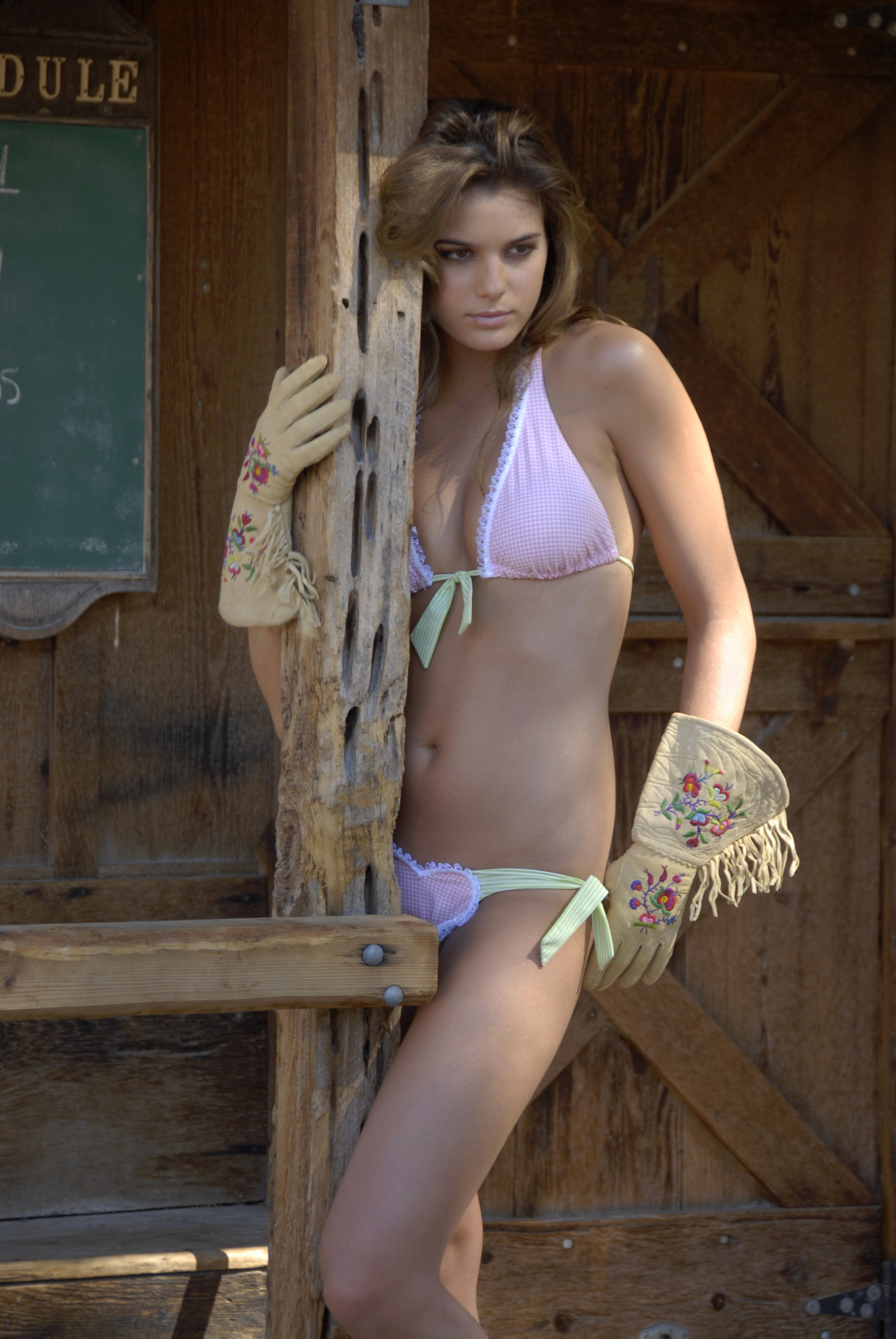
- Toscanini in Tucson, Arizona in October 2006
- Born: Yésica Toscanini; March 26, 1986 (age 40); Junín, Argentina
- Modeling information
- Height: 1.76 m (5 ft 9 in)
- Hair color: Brown
- Eye color: Brown
- Agency: Dotto Models - Venice, Italy

Yésica Toscanini (Spanish pronunciation: [ˈʝesika toskaˈnini]; born 26 March 1986) is a professional Argentine fashion model. She was born in Junín, Argentina.

Toscanini appeared in Sports Illustrated Swimsuit Issue 2006/2007 editions, was featured on the front magazine cover for Cosmopolitan Argentine edition and twice for Para Ti, appeared in Abercrombie & Fitch 2006 catalog and played a love interest in Enrique Iglesias' "Do You Know? (The Ping Pong Song)" 2007 video. In 2008 she was selected as the girl for the Intimissimi spring–summer ad campaign.

Through legal counsel she requested, and was granted the right, to have all her images and data to be removed from Yahoo! search results in Argentina.
