= No Future in the Past (Nâdiya song) =

2008 single by Nâdiya and Kelly Rowland

Single by Nâdiya and Kelly Rowland

from the album Électron Libre
- Released: September 2008 (radio); October 2008 (download)
- Recorded: 2008
- Genre: Dance-pop, R&B
- Length: 3:22
- Label: Sony Music
- Songwriter: Laura Mayne
- Producers: Gilles Luka, Laura Mayne, Nâdiya Zighem

Nâdiya singles chronology
"Tired of Being Sorry" (2008)	"No Future in the Past" (2008)	"J'irai jusque là" (2008)

Kelly Rowland singles chronology
"Daylight" (2008)	""No Future in the Past"" (2008)	"Breathe Gentle" (2009)

Music video
- "No Future in the Past" on YouTube

"No Future in the Past" is a song written by Gilles Luka and Laura Mayne and recorded by the French R&B singer Nâdiya and American R&B singer Kelly Rowland for Nâdiya's fourth studio album Électron Libre. The song was released to radio stations near the end of September 2008, a digital release followed in early October, and had a physical release in November 2008.

== Music video ==
The futuristic themed music video was shot in Miami, Florida during July 2008, directed by Thierry Vergnes. It debuted to be aired on October 27 on the French music channel NRJ Hits.

== Charts ==
Chart (2008)	Peak position
CIS Airplay (TopHit)	123
French Airplay Chart	51
