= Simmonds Alone =

Alone (Spirit Tales)

Studio album by Stephen Simmonds
- Released: 1997 (Sweden, Japan); 1998 (United Kingdom); 2000 (United States)
- Genre: Soul, pop, R&B
- Length: 60:39 (Spirit Tales)
- Label: Superstudio/Diesel Music (SWE, JP); Parlophone/EMI(UK); Priority (US)
- Producer: Peter Cartriers, Stephen Simmonds

Stephen Simmonds chronology
Alone (Spirit Tales) (1997)	For Father (2002)

Alone was the debut album by Swedish singer Stephen Simmonds. It was first released in 1997 in Sweden and later in Japan. In 1998 and 2000 in UK and United States it went by the name Spirit Tales.

Japan Release (1997): "Alone" was also released in Japan, Simmonds added a recording from 1995 "Thank You For" (one of the tracks from the demo which was sent to diesel music), the song "One" which was on the "b-side" of the "Tears Never Dry" single and also a remix of the song "Alone".

UK Release (1998): "Alone" was renamed to "Spirit Tales" and was additionally produced and mixed on all the tracks except: "Tears Never Dry", "Alone" Judgement day" and "Let It Go". Songs "One" and "Believe" was added to the album.

US Release (2000): Simmonds worked with Raphael Saadiq and 2 Danish producers based in LA at the time called Soulshock and Karlin and added the tracks "If I Was Your Man" (co-written and produced by Raphael Saadiq) and "I Can't Do That" (co-written and produced by Soulshock and Karlin).

== Track listing for Alone ==
- All songs written by Stephen Simmonds, except as noted
1. Alone
2. Tears Never Dry
3. Now's The Time
4. For You
5. Universe
6. Searchin'
7. All The People
8. Get Down
9. Let It Go
10. Hope U Do
11. Judgement Day

=== Japan edition ===
Added tracks (Alone album)

1. One
2. Thank You For
3. Alone "Funkyman mix" (featuring Big L & Marquee)

== Track listing for Spirit Tales ==
=== Japan Edition ===
Added tracks (Spirit Tales album)

1. Alone (Funkyman Mix feat. Big L & Marquee)
2. I Can't Do That (M.A.W. Vocal)

=== UK edition ===
Added tracks (Spirit Tales album 1998)

1. Believe
2. One

=== US edition ===
Added tracks (Spirit Tales album 2000)

1. I Can't Do That (Stephen Simmonds, Carsten Schack, Kenneth Karlin, Francois de Roubaix)
2. If I Was Your Man (Stephen Simmonds, Raphael Saadiq)

== Singles ==
- Tears Never Dry
- Now's The Time
- Alone
- I Can't Do That (US)
- Get Down (US)
