= Parle-moi (Nâdiya song) =

Single by Nâdiya

from the album 16/9
- B-side: "Signes"
- Released: March 26, 2004
- Genre: R&B, pop
- Length: 4:05
- Label: Sony
- Songwriters: Géraldine Delacoux, Thierry Gronfier
- Producer: Thierry Gronfier

Nâdiya singles chronology
"J'ai confiance en toi" (2002)	"Parle-moi" (2004)	"Et c'est parti..." (2004)

Alternative covers
- Promo single cover, using the album cover

Alternative cover
- CD single 2 cover

Music video
- "Parle-moi" on YouTube

"Parle-moi" (English: Talk to Me) is a song recorded by the French contemporary R&B singer Nâdiya, featured on her second studio album 16/9. Written by Géraldine Delacoux, Thierry Gronfier and produced by the latter, the track served as the first single off the album, released on CD on March 26, 2004 in France. The song was Nâdiya's best-selling single in France up to mid-2006, when the song lost its status to "Roc", which sold over 250,000 copies of the single.

== Formats and track listings ==
Promo single

1. "Parle-moi" (radio edit) — 4:06

CD single

1. "Parle-moi" (radio edit) — 4:05
2. "Signes" — 3:36
3. "Parle-moi" (instrumental) — 4:06
4. "Parle-moi" (video)

7" maxi single

A-side:

1. "Parle-moi" (tek mix)
2. "Parle-moi" (a capella)

B-side:

1. "Parle-moi" (album version) — 3:36
2. "Parle-moi" (instrumental) — 4:04

== Remixes and official versions ==
- Album version — 4:05
- Radio edit — 4:05
- Instrumental — 4:04
- Karaoke version — 4:04
- 6Mondini remix — 5:00
- Extended version — 5:08
- Tek mix
- A capella

== Reception ==
The song was received with overall positive reactions. A Fnac music store reviewer called the song "devilish catchy".

== Chart performance ==
The song made its first appearance in the French charts on March 21, 2004, one week before its official physical release, debuting at number 79 (#70). The next week, the single made one of the biggest jumps in the history of the chart, moving seventy-seven (77) places up to the second place (#2), where it eventually also peaked. The song remained in the top ten for 9 weeks, 5 more weeks in the top 20 and a total of 24 weeks in the chart. A silver certification followed a months after its release by Syndicat National de l'Édition Phonographique (SNEP), the French music certifier, for selling over 100,000 copies. The single peaked at number twenty-two (#22) in the 2004 French Singles year end chart.

In Switzerland, "Parle-moi" was Nâdiya's best-selling and best-performing single (up to the release of 2008's "Tired of Being Sorry (Laisse le destin l'emporter)" duet with Enrique Iglesias). The debuted at number eighteen (#18), to peak at number eleven (#11) in its fifth week charting. It remained eight weeks in the top 20 and a total of 17 weeks in the top 50.

=== Weekly charts ===
Chart (2004–2005)	Peak position
Belgian (Flemish) ultratip (Bubbling under)	8
Belgian (Wallonia) Singles Chart	2
French SNEP Singles Chart	2
Polish Airplay Chart	1
Swiss Singles Chart	11

=== Year-end charts ===
Chart (2004)	Position
Belgian (Wallonia) Singles Chart	7
French Airplay Chart	69
French Club Chart	39
French Singles Chart	22
French TV Videos Chart	33
Swiss Singles Chart	54

=== Certifications ===
Certifications for "Parle-moi"
Region	Certification	Certified units/sales
Belgium (BRMA)	Gold	25,000^{*}
France (SNEP)	Silver	125,000^{*}
^{*} Sales figures based on certification alone.
