= Do You Know? (The Ping Pong Song) =

2007 single by Enrique Iglesias

Single by Enrique Iglesias

from the album Insomniac
- Released: 24 April 2007
- Genre: Dance-pop; synth-pop
- Length: 3:38
- Label: Interscope
- Songwriters: Sean Garrett; Enrique Iglesias; Brian Kidd
- Producers: Brian Kidd; Sean Garrett

Enrique Iglesias singles chronology
"Not in Love" (2004)	"Do You Know? (The Ping Pong Song)" / "Dímelo" (2007)	"Somebody's Me" / "Alguien Soy Yo" (2007)

Music video
- "Enrique Iglesias - Do You Know? (The Ping Pong Song)" on YouTube

Music video
- "Enrique Iglesias - Dímelo (Closed Captioned, Spanish Version w/Beep)" on YouTube

"Do You Know? (The Ping Pong Song)" is a song by Spanish singer Enrique Iglesias. It was released in 2007 as the first single from his eighth studio album, Insomniac and takes the latter part of its English name from the sound of a ping pong ball bouncing that is employed as a percussion track throughout the song. The song's Spanish version is entitled "Dímelo" and was released to Latin radio, becoming Iglesias' 17th number one song on the US Billboard Hot Latin Songs.

== Lyrics and music ==
Iglesias generally refers to the song as simply "Do You Know?", as it was his record label's insistence to add on "The Ping Pong Song" in parentheses (for the obvious sound of a ping pong ball bouncing to start the song and set the beat) to make it more distinctive and marketable.

The instrumental backing tracks are based on sampled loops from the production company Bunker 8 Digital Labs. These samples include all of the original tracks in "Otiga Verde" from the sample library. The opening piano, guitar chord riffs, and lead sound synthesizer which is heard throughout the song are directly lifted from the individual sample loops.

== Reception ==
Iglesias premiered the song on Ryan Seacrest's radio show on KIIS-FM on Tuesday, 10 April 2007. The song was officially shipped to radio stations and, a week later, reached number 2 on the Billboard Bubbling Under Hot 100 Singles chart.

Iglesias performed the song on Dancing with the Stars on 15 May 2007, on the day that the song was made available in the U.S. iTunes Store as a digital single, where it eventually reached number 13.

The song soon made its debut on the Billboard Hot 100 at number 33. It reached the top ten on the Billboard Hot Dance Club Play, peaking at number 3.

The song reached number three on the UK iTunes Store, making its debut on the UK Singles Chart at number 28 and climbing to number nine in its second week, and was released as a physical CD single format on Monday, 11 June. The song has reached number three on the UK Singles Chart.

The Spanish version of the song, entitled "Dímelo" (which, notably, uses completely different lyrics to the original English version), made a 48-point jump from number 49 to number one on the Billboard Hot Latin Songs chart and held top spot for six weeks before being knocked off by Marco Antonio Solís's single "Ojalá", but it reclaimed the number one spot three weeks later and held it for another four. It was then knocked off once more before regaining it for a week, accumulating a total of eleven weeks atop the chart. Holding off strong competition from Daddy Yankee and Chayanne, the song is Iglesias's seventeenth number one on the chart, the best-performing single on Hot Latin Songs that year and Iglesias' best-performing single on the chart since "Enamorado Por Primera Vez" in 1997. It also broke the four-year-long tie with Luis Miguel for most number-ones on the chart with 17.

The single was released to radio in his home country, Spain, peaked at number six on the official download Spanish chart and reached number one in the airplay chart. The single was not released physically there due to the diminishing single sales market and the growing importance of digital downloads there.

Some American radio stations have taken to playing a different version of the song which contains a more rhythmic beat.

== Music video ==
The song's music video is directed by Jessy Terrero and is ostensibly a parody of the thought process that many directors have when making Iglesias music videos. The video cuts back and forth between scenes in which the ideas for the videos are being proposed to Iglesias and the videos themselves.

The video starts with Iglesias and his manager, played by legendary Big Brother player Mike Boogie, meeting up with one of the hottest directors in the business. When they arrive, the director, played by Jon Abrahams, is surrounded by scantily clad women, some of whom are occupying themselves by playing ping pong. The director suggests that the video to Iglesias's newest single start out with Iglesias dressed in a white suit next to a hotel swimming pool, surrounded by women, when one in particular, played by Mexican model Pamela Burgos, catches his eye. Iglesias watches her and is seen interacting with her in a bed before the scene shifts to Burgos arguing with her lover outside the hotel and then walking into the road, only to be run over by a car.

When Iglesias shows little interest at the clichéd idea the director pitches him a second: he is in the woods with his high-school sweetheart, played by Argentine model Yésica Toscanini. The two interact before she playfully runs away. As he catches up with her at the edge of a cliff, she mimes the words "I love you", at which Iglesias is visibly pleased. He becomes distressed, though, as she goes closer to the edge. Finally, she dives off backwards.

Iglesias groans at the director's idea, mutters to his manager, "Este cabrón está loco" (lit: "This fucker is crazy"), and leaves. After the manager follows him, the director opines to his women that the pair obviously liked his idea.

There are two versions of the video, the censored version (with the word "cabrón" beeped//silenced out) which is mostly shown on television, and the original (with "cabrón" intact) which is available on YouTube. Some countries cut out a few of the Iglesias-and-director scenes. The Spanish version of the video, titled "Dímelo", is exactly the same as the English one except Iglesias mouths the words to the song in Spanish.

On the video-sharing website YouTube, Universal Music's upload of the video is the 94th-most-viewed video of all time in the music category. The song peaked for several days at number two on MTV's TRL.

There are 2 unreleased remix videos using the Ralphi Rosario & Craig J's Vocal Mix and the DJ Dan & Dave Audè Club Mix

== Track listings ==
UK CD single

1. "Do You Know?" – 3:49
2. "Do You Know?" (DJ Dan & Dave Audé Club Remix) – 7:16

German CD single / UK digital download

1. "Do You Know?" – 3:49
2. "Dimelo" – 3:40
3. "Do You Know?" (Ralphi Rosario & Craig CJs Vocal Mix) – 9:30
4. "Do You Know?" (Music Video)

== Charts ==
=== Weekly charts ===
Chart (2007)	Peak position
Austria (Ö3 Austria Top 40)	8
Belgium (Ultratop 50 Flanders)	9
Belgium (Ultratop 50 Wallonia)	8
Canada Hot 100 (Billboard)	19
Canada Hot AC (Billboard)	35
CIS Airplay (TopHit)	7
Croatia International Airplay (HRT)	2
Czech Republic Airplay (ČNS IFPI)	1
Denmark (Tracklisten)	5
Europe (Eurochart Hot 100)	2
France (SNEP)	9
Germany (GfK)	6
Hungary (Rádiós Top 40)	3
Ireland (IRMA)	2
Netherlands (Dutch Top 40)	2
Netherlands (Single Top 100)	15
Norway (VG-lista)	15
Romania (Romanian Top 100)	1
Russia Airplay (TopHit)	7
Slovakia Airplay (ČNS IFPI)	7
Sweden (Sverigetopplistan)	3
Switzerland (Schweizer Hitparade)	4
UK Singles (Official Charts)	3
UK Airplay (Music Week)	3
US Billboard Hot 100	21
US Dance Club Songs (Billboard)	3
US Hot Latin Songs (Billboard); Spanish version: "Dímelo"	1
US Pop Airplay (Billboard)	39
US Tropical Songs (Billboard); Spanish version: "Dímelo"	1

=== Year-end charts ===
Chart (2007)	Position
Austria (Ö3 Austria Top 40)	42
Belgium (Ultratop 50 Flanders)	31
Belgium (Ultratop 50 Wallonia)	40
CIS (Tophit)	38
Europe (Eurochart Hot 100)	31
Germany (Media Control GfK)	41
Netherlands (Dutch Top 100)	11
Romania (Romanian Top 100)	7
Russia Airplay (TopHit)	49
Sweden (Sverigetopplistan)	20
Switzerland (Schweizer Hitparade)	14
UK Singles (OCC)	26

Chart (2008)	Position
France (SNEP)	63

== Certifications ==
Region	Certification	Certified units/sales
Denmark (IFPI Danmark)	Gold	7,500^{^}
Germany (BVMI)	Gold	150,000^{‡}
Sweden (GLF)	Platinum	20,000^{^}
United Kingdom (BPI)	Gold	400,000^{‡}
^{^} Shipments figures based on certification alone.^{‡} Sales+streaming figures based on certification alone.

== Release history ==
Release dates and formats for "Do You Know? (The Ping Pong Song)"
Region	Date	Format	Label	Ref.
United States	24 April 2007	Contemporary hit radio	Interscope	
Australia	28 May 2007	CD single	Universal	
United Kingdom	11 June 2007	CD single	Polydor	
Germany	22 June 2007	CD single	Universal	

== Covers ==
In 2021, the Swedish singer Efraim Leo released a cover of the song on Elaine Records.

== Reggaeton Remix ==
In that same year (2007) the music producer Nely "El Arma Secreta" made a remix of the song adding the reggaeton singer Dalmata on it.

== See also ==
- Number-one hits of 2007 (U.S. Hot Latin Tracks)
- List of Romanian Top 100 number ones of the 2000s
