= Vivre ou survivre (Nâdiya song) =

"Vivre ou Survivre"

Single by Nâdiya

from the album La Source
- B-side: "La Source (Slam)"
- Released: November 26, 2007
- Recorded: 2007
- Genre: Dance-pop, R&B
- Length: 3:51
- Label: Columbia
- Songwriter(s): Charlie Idounda
- Producer(s): Thierry Gronfier

Nâdiya singles chronology
"Amies-ennemies" (2006)	"Vivre ou Survivre" (2007)	"Tired of Being Sorry (Laisse le Destin L'emporter)" (2008)

Music video
- "Vivre ou survivre" on YouTube

"Vivre ou Survivre" ("Live or Survive") is a song recorded by the French R&B singer Nâdiya for her greatest hits album La Source. The song was released to radio stations in September 2007 and had a physical release on November 26, 2007, two weeks after the album release.

== Music video ==
The music video officially premiered on October 15, the same day it was released as a digital single to iTunes. It shows Nâdiya in the jungle, wrestling herself out of the wild. The theme of the song, the choice between living or not, is portrayed as Nâdiya is shown escaping from the wildlife to the ocean, presumably waiting for rescue.

== Track listings ==
Digital download (October 15, 2007)

1. "Vivre ou Survivre" (radio edit) – 4:02

CD single (November 26, 2007)

1. "La Source (Slam)" – 0:30
2. "Vivre ou Survivre" (radio mix) – 3:51
3. L'histoire de La Source (The History of La Source) [documentary]

== Charts ==
Chart (2007)	Peak position
French SNEP Singles Chart	26
