= Tired of Being Sorry =

Song written by Scott Thomas

"Tired of Being Sorry" is a song written by American singer-songwriter Scott Thomas for his band, Ringside. It was a big radio hit in Poland in 2005. Spanish singer Enrique Iglesias later covered the song and released it as the second international single from his album Insomniac (2008). This version achieved success in several European countries, where it was a top-10 hit. In 2008, the song was re-recorded as a bilingual duet with French singer Nâdiya under the title "Tired of Being Sorry (Laisse le destin l'emporter)" and became a hit in French-speaking regions.

== Enrique Iglesias version ==
"Tired of Being Sorry"

Single by Enrique Iglesias

from the album Insomniac
- Released: September 24, 2007
- Length: 4:01
- Label: Interscope
- Songwriter: Scott Thomas
- Producer: Scott Thomas

Enrique Iglesias singles chronology
"Do You Know? (The Ping Pong Song)" (2007)	"Tired of Being Sorry" (2007)	"Somebody's Me" (2007)

Music video
- "Enrique Iglesias - Tired Of Being Sorry (MUSIC VIDEO)" on YouTube

Music video
- "Enrique Iglesias - Amigo Vulnerable" on YouTube

=== Background ===
The Enrique Iglesias version of "Tired of Being Sorry" was produced by Scott Thomas, Ringside's songwriter and lead vocalist. Iglesias's version is essentially the same, although he uses stronger synth pop elements than in the original, and the line "Chandler and Van Nuys" has been changed to "Eighth and Ocean Drive", exchanging an intersection in Los Angeles to an intersection in Miami, where Iglesias is based. Some fans have noted that Iglesias's recorded version sounds more similar to how Ringside plays the song in concert.

Iglesias first performed the song on his For the Fans tour and was invited by Scott Thomas to give an impromptu performance of the song during Ringside's concert at The Roxy Theatre.

=== Chart performance ===
Iglesias's version topped the Finnish and Romanian singles charts. It was also a top-10 hit in Flanders and the Netherlands. The single went triple platinum in Russia with 600,000 copies sold.

=== Music video ===
The music video was directed by Jessy Terrero who had directed Iglesias's previous video "Do You Know? (The Ping Pong Song)". The video depicts Iglesias as a vampire perched at top of the Peninsula Hotel Bangkok at night, remembering how he was turned.

Starting with an argument with his girlfriend, Iglesias storms out of an apartment and while on the streets he spots a seductive female vampire, played by model Donna Feldman, and follows her into a busy underground club where she lures him into a back room and bites him. Examining himself in the mirror, Iglesias inspects the bite marks on his neck and watches how his reflection disappears. The final part of the video has Iglesias meeting up with his girlfriend again and they embrace but then Iglesias disappears into thin air.

The song and video were featured on America's Next Top Model, Cycle 9, in an episode focused on video modeling. The remaining girls played various roles in the underground club scenes, and an alternate cut was created, which can be seen on the official CW website. This version of the video was played regularly on MTV Tr3s.

=== Track listing ===
CD single

1. "Tired of Being Sorry" (Main Version) — 4:01
2. "Tired of Being Sorry" (Ean Sugarman & Funky Junction guitar mix) — 7:17

=== Credits and personnel ===
- All tracks published by Highland Songs / Universal Music Publishing (ASCAP) / Enrique Iglesias Music / EMI April Music (ASCAP)
- Photo : Salm / Slamphotography
- Made in the U.S.

"Tired of Being Sorry" (original English version)

- Written by Scott Thomas
- Adaptation by Enrique Iglesias
- Produced by Scott Thomas

Ean Sugarman & Funky Junction remixes

- Remixed and produced by Ean Sugarman and Funky Junction

Dummies remix

- Remixed by The Dummies
- Produced by Dave Audé and Juan Martinez

=== Charts and sales ===
==== Weekly charts ====
Chart (2007–2008)	Peak position
Belgium (Ultratop 50 Flanders)	9
Belgium (Ultratop 50 Wallonia)	32
Canada Hot 100 (Billboard)	71
CIS Airplay (TopHit)	5
Czech Republic Airplay (ČNS IFPI)	3
Denmark (Tracklisten)	14
Finland (Suomen virallinen lista)	1
Germany (GfK)	46
Hungary (Rádiós Top 40)	7
Ireland (IRMA)	12
Netherlands (Dutch Top 40)	3
Netherlands (Single Top 100)	3
Romania (Romanian Top 100)	1
Russia Airplay (TopHit)	5
Sweden (Sverigetopplistan)	16
UK Singles (Official Charts)	20

==== Year-end charts ====
Chart (2007)	Position
CIS Airplay (TopHit)	74
Netherlands (Dutch Top 40)	17
Netherlands (Single Top 100)	30
Russia Airplay (TopHit)	78

Chart (2008)	Position
Belgium (Ultratop 50 Flanders)	64
Belgium (Ultratop 50 Wallonia)	83
CIS Airplay (TopHit)	21
Hungary (Rádiós Top 40)	24
Russia Airplay (TopHit)	21

==== Decade-end charts ====
Decade-end chart performance for "Tired of Being Sorry"
Chart (2000–2009)	Position
CIS Airplay (TopHit)	19
Russia Airplay (TopHit)	20

=== Certifications and sales ===
Region	Certification	Certified units/sales
Russia (NFPF)	3× Platinum	600,000^{*}
^{*} Sales figures based on certification alone.

=== Release history ===
Release dates and formats for "Tired of Being Sorry"
Region	Date	Format	Label	Ref.
United Kingdom	September 24, 2007	CD single	Polydor	
Germany	November 16, 2007	CD single	Universal	

== Enrique Iglesias and Nâdiya version ==
"Tired of Being Sorry (Laisse le destin l'emporter)"

Single by Enrique Iglesias featuring Nâdiya

from the album Électron Libre
- Language: English; French
- Released: April 14, 2008
- Length: 3:34
- Label: Interscope
- Songwriters: Scott Thomas, Géraldine Delacoux, Nâdiya
- Producer: Scott Thomas

Enrique Iglesias singles chronology
"Somebody's Me" / "Alguien Soy Yo" (2007)	"Tired of Being Sorry (Laisse le destin l'emporter)" (2008)	"Push" (2008)

Nâdiya singles chronology
"Vivre ou survivre" (2007)	"Tired of Being Sorry" (2008)	"No Future in the Past" (2008)

Music video
- "Nâdiya - Tired of Being Sorry avec Enrique Iglesias (clip officiel)" on YouTube

=== Background ===
Iglesias also recorded the song as a duet with French singer Nâdiya under the title "Tired of Being Sorry (Laisse le destin l'emporter)" with French and English lyrics (respectively performed by Nâdiya and Iglesias), and was released in France in April 2008. Both artists decided to re-record the song together because they had the same record label at the time. Iglesias also recorded a Spanish version of the song called "Amigo Vulnerable".

Another video has been shot for the French version "Tired of Being Sorry (Laisse le destin l'emporter)". In it, Nâdiya and Iglesias are singing each from their part (she is outside, while he is near a car) before meeting around the end of the video.

=== Critical reception ===
This version received generally positive reviews. For example, Musiqueradio.com website elected the duet version as the "song of the year" and deemed it a "historical duet". Iglesias and Nâdiya were nominated for the 2009 NRJ Music Awards in the categories 'French group / duet / troupe of the year' and 'French song of the year', but they did not win.

=== Chart performances ===
In France, the version with Nâdiya entered the French Singles Chart number one on the chart edition of April 19, 2008, with 10,625 copies sold. It stayed at number one for 11 week, and its weekly sales hit a peak of more than 17,000 sales, which was rare at the time in France. The track totaled 24 weeks in the top five, 28 weeks in the top 10, and 41 weeks in the top 50. According to the Charts in France website, over 300,000 copies of the single were sold in France. In September 2008, SNEP revealed that the song was the best-selling single and the 12th-most-downloaded song of the first six months of 2008, and it eventually became the best-selling single of the year. As of August 2014, it is the 62nd-best-selling single of the 21st century in France, with 360,000 units sold.

In the Wallonia region of Belgium, the single entered the Ultratop singles chart at number 24 on May 24, 2008, and topped the chart from its fifth to eighth week. It remained on the chart for 25 weeks. The single re-entered the chart for three weeks after Iglesias's performance of the song on the television reality show Star Academy France, on December 19, 2008, and both singers' performance on Les Disques d'Or, which aired on TF1 during the first days of 2009. The song also charted in Switzerland, reaching number six on the Swiss Hitparade.

=== Track listings ===
CD single

1. "Tired of Being Sorry (Laisse le destin l'emporter)" — 4:01
2. "Tired of Being Sorry (Laisse le destin l'emporter)" (album version) — 4:34
3. "Tired of Being Sorry" (original English version) by Enrique Iglesias — 4:05
4. "Amigo vulnerable" (Spanish version) by Enrique Iglesias — 4:00

Digital download

1. "Tired of Being Sorry (Laisse le destin l'emporter)" — 4:01
2. "Tired of Being Sorry (Laisse le destin l'emporter)" (album version) — 4:34

=== Credits and personnel ===
"Tired of Being Sorry (Laisse le destin l'emporter)"

- Written by Nâdiya Zighem, Géraldine Delacoux and Scott Thomas
- Adaptation by Enrique Iglesias
- Produced by Scott Thomas

"Amigo vulnerable"

- Spanish lyrics by Luis Gómez-Escolar
- Spanish version produced by Carlos Paucar and Enrique Iglesias
- Enrique's vocals production by Carlos Paucar and Enrique Iglesias
- Vocals recorded at South Point Studios (The Crackhouse)

=== Charts ===
==== Weekly charts ====
Chart (2008)	Peak position
Belgium (Ultratop 50 Wallonia)	1
Europe (Eurochart Hot 100)	3
France (SNEP)	1
France Airplay (SNEP)	5
France Digital (SNEP)	3
Switzerland (Schweizer Hitparade)	6

==== Year-end charts ====
Chart (2008)	Position
Belgium (Ultratop 50 Wallonia)	8
Europe (Eurochart Hot 100)	12
France (SNEP)	1
France Airplay (SNEP)	11
France Digital (SNEP)	13
Switzerland (Schweizer Hitparade)	44

=== Certifications and sales ===
Region	Certification	Certified units/sales
Belgium (BRMA)	Gold	
France (SNEP)	Gold	360,000

=== Release history ===
Release dates and formats for "Tired of Being Sorry (Laisse Le Destin l'Emporter)"
Region	Date	Format	Label	Ref.
France	April 14, 2008	CD single	Universal	

== See also ==
- List of Romanian Top 100 number ones of the 2000s
