= Ocean Drive (band) =

French dance music project

- Origin: France
- Genres: Pop, electro dance
- Years active: 2008–present
- Members: Gilles Luka; DJ Oriska; Nicholas Carel; Just Uman

Ocean Drive is a French dance music band. established in 2008 and made up of French record producers Nicolas Carel and Just Uman. A successful European electronic dance and pop act with an album With the Sunshine and a number of singles in France, Belgium and Switzerland, they collaborate with vocalist Gilles Luka, formerly a member of bands Galleon and Luka, and with DJ Oriska, Smartzee and more recently with Norwegian singer / entertainer of Iranian origin Aylar Lie. Carel and Uman launched the band after meeting at a nightclub in Miami, Florida and the music project is named after the fashionable Ocean Drive in South Beach, Miami, Florida.

In May 2010, Ocean Drive signed a record deal with British electronic label Dance Nation for launching their materials in Britain as well. The remake of "Some People" featuring Aylar was the debut single on the new label in Britain.

== Discography ==
=== Albums ===
Year	Album	Peak chart positions	Certifications
Year	Album	FRA	Certifications
2009	With the Sunshine (feat. DJ Oriska)	23	

=== Singles ===
Year	Single	Peak chart positions				Certifications	Notes	Album
Year	Single	BEL (Wa)	BEL (Vl)	FRA	SWI	Certifications	Notes	Album
2009	"Some People (Ton désir)" (feat. DJ Oriska)	30	17	8	39			With the Sunshine
2009	"Without You (Perdue sans toi)" (feat. DJ Oriska)	22	—	4	37			With the Sunshine
2009	"Because (Connecte-toi)" (feat. DJ Oriska)	—	—	11	—			With the Sunshine
2009	"Diggin It" (feat. DJ Oriska and Smartzee)	—	—	—	—			
2009	"Your Man" (feat. DJ Oriska and Smartzee)	—	—	—	—			
2010	"Some People" (feat. Aylar)	—	—	—	—		Remake of 2009 hit	
2012	"Whatever (Encore et encore)"	—	—	48	—			
