= 16/9 (album) =

2004 studio album by Nâdiya

Studio album by Nâdiya
- Released: June 1, 2004 (France, Switzerland); August 2004 (International)
- Recorded: 2003–2004; Olympic Studios, London; Studio De La Seine, Paris; Unit Studio, Paris
- Genres: R&B, pop, dance-pop, hip hop, pop rock
- Length: 47:55
- Labels: Columbia, Sony Music
- Producer: Thierry Gronfier

Nâdiya chronology
Changer les choses (2001)	16/9 (2004)	Nâdiya (2006)

16/9 is the 2004 studio album by the French R&B singer Nâdiya. The album and singles off it were a huge success and very popular in France and Switzerland. The album remained for over 90 weeks on the French album chart, which is a remarkable achievement for an album. The album peaked at number six in its thirty-third week. After a year and seven months, the album was certified platinum by SNEP, the French certifier, which means it has sold over 300,000 copies in France. It won the Victoires de la musique award for best rap/hip-hop/R&B album of the year.

== Track listing ==
1. "Ouverture" – 0:26
2. "Parle-moi" (Géraldine Delacoux, Thierry Gronfier) – 4:35
3. "Et c'est parti..." (featuring Smartzee) (Thierry Gronfier, Nâdiya, Mehdy Boussaïd, Hector Zounon) – 3:51
4. "Quand vient la nuit" (featuring Yanis, her son) (Thierry Gronfier, Mehdy Boussaïd) – 3:41
5. "Si loin de vous" (Hey Oh... Par la Radio) (Thierry Gronfier, Nâdiya, Mehdy Boussaïd) – 4:18
6. "Les gestes pas les mots" (Lionel Florence, Jean-Pierre Taïeb) – 3:10
7. "Space" (featuring S.T.A.) (Mehdy Boussaïd, Franck Rougier) – 4:50
8. "Nâdiya, Vers les étoiles" (featuring Cool-T) (Eddy Gronfier, Christine Asamoah, Mehdy Boussaïd, Thierry Gronfier, Thomas Pieds) – 4:43
9. "Signes" (Mehdy Boussaïd, Thierry Gronfier, Sindbad Ioualalen) – 3:36
10. "Hey!!! Laisse tomber!" (Géraldine Delacoux, Thierry Gronfier) – 5:00
11. "Ouvre grand ton coeur" (Laura Mayne, Yves-Michel Akle) – 4:46
12. "La personne à qui tu penses" (Annie Chazard, David Manet, Pierre François Richeux) – 5:18

== Chart performance ==
Chart (2004)	Peak Position	Weeks on chart
French Album Top 200	6	93
Belgium Wallonie Album Top 50	19	32
Swiss Album Top 100	76	13

== Certifications ==
Certifications for 16/9
Region	Certification	Certified units/sales
France (SNEP)	Platinum	300,000^{*}
^{*} Sales figures based on certification alone.
