= Somebody's Me =

"Somebody's Me / Alguien Soy Yo"

Single by Enrique Iglesias

from the album Insomniac
- Released: 7 August 2007
- Recorded: 2006
- Genre: Pop
- Length: 3:58
- Label: Interscope
- Songwriters: Enrique Iglesias; John Shanks; Kara DioGuardi
- Producer: John Shanks

Enrique Iglesias singles chronology
"Do You Know? (The Ping Pong Song)" / "Dímelo" (2007)	"Somebody's Me / Alguien Soy Yo" (2007)	"Tired Of Being Sorry" (2007)

Music video
- "Somebody's Me" on YouTube

"Somebody's Me" is the second single released from Enrique Iglesias fourth English studio album, Insomniac. Along with the Spanish version of the song, "Alguien Soy Yo", it was released as a CD single exclusively in Mexico and Latin America on 10 December 2007. The single found success in the United States, Canada and Latin America.

== Song information ==
Iglesias debuted the song on the season finale of Extreme Makeover: Home Edition. He also sang the song during his "For the Fans" tour of club venues which previewed songs from his then upcoming album. The song proved to be a hit with fans. Originally the song was not to be the second single from Insomniac. Prior to the decision to release it "Push" was planned as the second single, several articles about the album cited it as the second single and was confirmed by Iglesias in several interviews. The first signs that "Somebody's Me" would be chosen instead came during an appearance by Iglesias on MTV's Total Request Live. The singer stated that either "Push" or "Somebody's Me" would be the next single for the US and that he and his management would be looking throughout the Internet to choose which would be the better choice. During a phone interview with KRQQ in Tucson, Arizona Iglesias stated that "Somebody's Me" would be the second US single from Insomniac. Iglesias embarked on a radio tour of twentytwo radio stations throughout North America focusing mostly on CHR stations but also stopping by some AC stations to promote the single. The song did not fare well on CHR missing the Billboard Hot 100 though after a while did much better on AC radio where it went Top Twenty. Iglesias promoted the song on a number on television shows such as So You Think You Can Dance, Regis & Kelly, Mike & Juliet and made his first soap opera debut performing the song on The Young and the Restless. The song was also featured during Iglesias's guest appearance on How I Met Your Mother. In July 2007, Iglesias appeared on Canadian Idol in Toronto, Ontario, Canada. His first appearance on the show was to coach the Top Eight contestants followed by his second appearance to perform "Somebody's Me" from Insomniac and his 2000 #1 hit, "Be With You". His performance was enthusiastically received by both the audience and judges who all gave Iglesias a standing ovation. The song was released in Europe as the third single from Insomniac releasing the song to radio and music television stations. The single received strong airplay in many countries such as Finland and Lithuania, due to the success of the previous single, "Tired of Being Sorry".

== Music video ==
Iglesias premiered the music video for "Somebody's Me" at an appearance on MTV Total Request Live on 14 August. During the appearance Iglesias stated that MTV censored parts of the video that were deemed too sexual. Sometime later an uncensored version was uploaded to Iglesias's official YouTube channel under the name "Somebody's Me: Directors Cut". Later on, the less-explicit version of the video was uploaded to Iglesias Vevo page as the official video. The music video was directed by Anthony Mandler and features Sarai Givaty, a famous Israeli model and was filmed in the streets of Los Angeles, in June 2007. The video follows Iglesias as he enters a studio apartment and him kissing his love interest in a bath tub and both of them simulating making love. Also in the video are scenes of them meeting in an empty street and a scene in which he plays cards as she does a pencil portrait of him (art being an interest of Givati's). Whether Iglesias is remembering his love interest or imagining her is not made clear in the video, however some fans feel that the video depicts an imminent breakup that both characters will regret. At 4:15 it appears that Iglesias depicts suicide by leaning backwards from the edge of an abandoned building. As of now the video has more than 57 million views on YouTube.

There is also a Spanish version of the video, titled "Alguien Soy Yo", which is set to the 'Directors Cut' take, but Iglesias mouths the Spanish song instead.

== Track listing ==
Mexican CD single

1. "Somebody's Me" - 3:58
2. "Alguien Soy Yo" - 3:59

== Charts ==
=== Weekly charts ===
Chart (2007–2008)	Peak position
Belgium (Ultratip Bubbling Under Flanders)	24
Canada Hot 100 (Billboard)	31
Russia (TopHit)	69
US Bubbling Under Hot 100 (Billboard)	6
US Adult Contemporary (Billboard)	15
US Dance Club Songs (Billboard)	4
US Hot Latin Songs (Billboard) Alguien Soy yo	4
US Latin Pop Airplay (Billboard) Alguien Soy yo	2

=== Year-end charts ===
Chart (2008)	Position
Canada AC (Billboard)	17
US Hot Latin Songs (Billboard) Alguien Soy yo	37

== Release history ==
Release dates and formats for "Somebody's Me"
Region	Date	Format	Label	Ref.
United States	7 August 2007	Contemporary hit radio	Interscope	
Russia	17 December 2007	Contemporary hit radio	Universal	
