= Tous ces mots =

Single by Nâdiya featuring Smartzee

from the album Nâdiya
- B-side: "Flash back"
- Released: February 24, 2006
- Recorded: 2006
- Genre: R&B, dance-pop, hip hop
- Length: 3:35
- Label: Sony BMG
- Songwriters: Géraldine Delacoux, Thierry Gronfier
- Producer: Thierry Gronfier

Nâdiya singles chronology
"Signes" (2005)	"Tous ces mots" (2006)	"Roc" (2006)

Smartzee singles chronology
"Et c'est parti..." (2004)	"Tous ces mots" (2006)	"It's On" (2006)

Music video
- "Tous ces mots" on YouTube

"Tous ces mots" is a song recorded by the France-born singer Nâdiya accompanied by the English rapper Smartzee. The song was released as the first single from Nâdiya's self-titled third studio album Nâdiya on February 24, 2006 (see 2006 in music) in France and Switzerland.

== Music video ==
The song features Smartzee, a rapper who was also featured in her "Et c'est parti..." song and music video. In the music video for "Tous ces mots", auto races are particularly shown, with Nâdiya in one of the cars racing. She is also shown 'performing' the song on a podium. In the end, Nâdiya's pink car wins.

== Chart performance ==
The Syndicat National de l'Edition Phonographique (SNEP) has revealed the best-selling singles during the first quarter of 2006 (from January 1 - March 31, 2006) and despite being released four weeks before the first quarter of 2006 ended, the single managed the song to peak at number thirteen.

Later, in December 2006, SNEP released a document with the best-selling singles from the first till the third quarter of 2006 (from January 1 till September 30). In this document, "Tous ces mots" ranked number thirteen again, this time with the following single "Roc" being at number twelve.

On the same website, a top 50 has been composed with the best-downloaded songs in 2006, with "Tous ces mots" peaking at number thirty-eight.

== Track listings ==
Digital download

1. "Tous ces mots" (radio edit) – 3:35

CD single (10:40)

1. "Tous ces mots" (radio edit) – 3:35
2. "Flash back" featuring Zo – 3:30
3. "Tous ces mots" (original karaoke version) – 3:35

== Charts ==
Chart (2006)	Peak position
Belgium (Flanders) Ultratop Singles Chart	29
Belgium (Wallonia) Ultratop Singles Chart	4
European Top 100	52
French Singles Chart	2
Swiss Singles Chart	25

End of year chart (2006)	Position
Belgian (Wallonia) Singles Chart	20
French Singles Chart	18

== Certifications ==
Certifications for "Tous ces mots"
Region	Certification	Certified units/sales
France (SNEP)	Gold	200,000^{*}
^{*} Sales figures based on certification alone.
