= Changer les Choses =

Changer les choses

Studio album by Nâdiya
- Released: November 5, 2001
- Recorded: 2001
- Genre: Pop
- Label: Sony BMG France

Nâdiya chronology
Changer les choses (2001)	16/9 (2004)

Changer les choses (Change the Things) is the official debut album by the France-born R&B singer Nâdiya. The album was only released in France on November 5, 2001. It spawned the French hit singles "Chaque fois" and "J'ai confiance en toi". Both singles charted in the French Singles Chart, but the album failed in France, not charting in the top 200 at all.

== Track listing ==
1. "Chaque fois" - 3:46
2. "J'te dis Bye Bye" - 3:24
3. "J'ai confiance en toi" - 3:56
4. "Qui pour rait m'aimer" - 3:33
5. "Rien que pour toi" - 2:52
6. "Simon" - 0:18
7. "Changer les choses" - 3:57
8. "La personne à qui tu penses" - 3:45
9. "Là-bas" - 0:14
10. "Le regard des miens" - 3:42
11. "Écoute ma prière" - 4:26
12. "Nos routes se séparent" - 3:41
13. "Quelques soient les apparences (feat. Eric Daniel)" - 3:37
14. "T'es en moi" - 4:17
15. "Ouvre grand ton coeur" - 5:06

== Singles ==
Year	Single info	Track listings	
Year	Single info	CD single	Maxi single
2001	"J'ai confiance en toi": Released: February 2001; "I Have Confidence in You"; Charts: #38 (France)	1. Album Version; 2. Light Mix	1. Funking Remix; 2. Break Mix; 3. Radio Mix; 4. Light Mix
2001	"Chaque fois": Released: 21 August 2001; "Everytime"; Charts: #27 (France)	1. "Chaque fois" 2. "La personne à qui tu penses"	1. Happy Floor Mix; 2. Imperial Machine Remix; 3. A.n.d House Mix; 4. Original Track
