= Smartzee =

French rapper (born 1980)

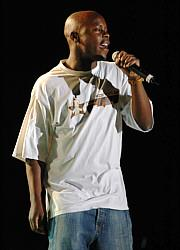
- Smartzee in 2006

Background information
- Born: 1980; 46 years ago Parakou, Benin
- Genres: Hip hop; R&B
- Occupations: Rapper; singer
- Years active: 2004 – present

Smartzee (born 1980) is a French rapper and singer born in Benin.

== Biography ==
Smartzee became known to the general public due to his feature on the single "Et c’est parti" of French R&B singer Nâdiya. The single reached the top 5 French rankings for 22 weeks. He remade a duet in 2005 with Nâdiya for the song "All these words" which reached the 2nd place. Smartzee released its first solo album, The Wishmaster, in December 2008.

== Discography ==
=== Albums ===
- 2008 – The Wishmaster

=== Singles ===
- 2004 – "Et c'est parti..." (Nâdiya feat. Smartzee), #2 France
- 2006 – "Tous ces mots" (Nâdiya feat. Smartzee), #2 France
- 2006 – "Roc" (Nâdiya), #2 France
- 2006 – "It's On" (feat. Gilles Luka)
- 2007 – "Comment Oublier" (Nâdiya ), #2 France
- 2009 – "Diggin It" (feat. DJ Oriska) Ocean Drive
- 2009 – "Your Man" (feat. DJ Oriska) Ocean Drive
