= Nâdiya =

French singer (born 1973)

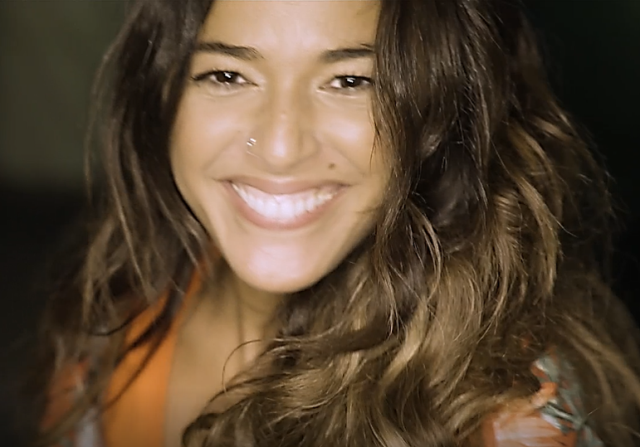
- Nâdiya in 2017

Background information
- Born: Nadia Zighem; 19 June 1973 (age 53); Tours, France
- Genres: R&B; pop
- Occupation: Singer
- Years active: 1999–present
- Label: N4Z Records
- Website: www.nadiyamusic.com

Nâdiya (born Nadia Zighem on 19 June 1973) is a French R&B singer.

== Early life ==
Nâdiya was born in the city of Tours, France in Algerian descent family. At school she displayed a talent for athletics, and gravitated towards the sport-studies section. In 1989, she won the title of Junior Champion of France's 800 metres.

== Career ==
=== 2001–2005: Early commercial success ===
The single "J'ai confiance en toi" (I Trust You), released in February 2001, became the first single that charted in the French Singles Chart, peaked at No. 38 in France and stayed in the chart for 13 weeks. The second single slated from the album did perform better than the first one. "Chaque fois" (Every Time) was released in August 2001 and peaked at No. 27 in the French Top 100 Singles, remaining in the chart for 18 weeks, five more than the first single. After the success of both singles, Nâdiya recorded a full studio album that became "Changer les choses" (Changing the Things). She was nominated for the Victoires de la musique in 2002.

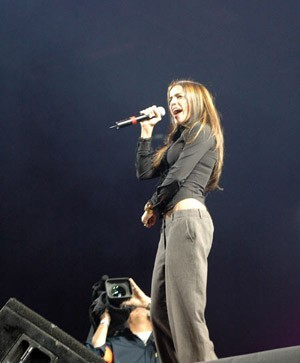
Nâdiya performing in 2009

In March 2004, Nâdiya released another song, this became "Parle-moi" (Talk to Me), a song about family problems and contact with her parents. The song became her first big hit in France, debuting in the chart at No. 79 and making an amazingly big jump to number two in its second week within the singles chart. The song still remains Nâdiya's biggest hit in France, staying in the chart for 24 weeks. "Parle-moi" also became her first single that charted in Switzerland, peaking at No. 11 in its fifth week in the Swiss Singles Top 100. In Poland this single became the Hit of the Summer 2004. Her second full French studio album was also recorded, 16/9 was released in June 2004. The album stayed in the chart for 93 non-consecutive weeks in the French album chart, with her highest peak being number six. Her (then) 5-year-old son also accompanied her on one song featured on the album ("Quand vient la nuit").

"Et c'est parti..." (French expression for "Here We Go"), the second single, became her first international hit, charting in several other European countries, including Belgium and the Netherlands. The music video to the song shows Nâdiya performing the song and boxing in a boxing ring. The single and video both feature Smartzee, a French rapper, and peaked at number five in France and number twenty-one in Switzerland. "Si loin de vous" ("So Far From You") was officially the last single off the 16/9 album, with "Signes" ("Signs") just being a download only single. "Si loin de vous", released in December 2004, was the last single off the album that charted in France (#6) and Switzerland (#27). Though there is a music video for "Signes", its function is only for promoting the album. In 2005, the 16/9 album also received the Victoires de la musique award for rap/hip-hop/R&B album of the year.

According to her official website, in France she has sold over 500,000 copies of 16/9, 750,000 singles and 300,000 copies of her platinum-certified "L'histoire en 16/9" ("The history to 16/9") DVD, which features the 3 music video's (to Parle-moi, Et c'est parti... and Si loin de vous), the making of the videos, interviews, photos and a bonus CD with remixed songs.

=== 2006–present: Career development ===
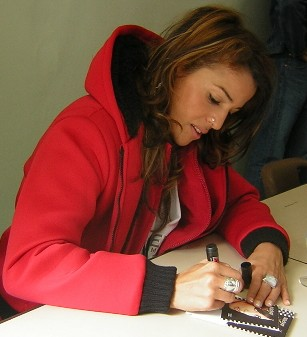
Nâdiya signing autographs (2006)

In February 2006, Nâdiya returned with her "Tous ces mots" ("All these words") single, her first song that features Smartzee. The song peaked at number two in the French Singles Chart and at twenty-five in the Swiss Singles Top 200. Following the success of "Tous ces mots", her self-titled third studio album Nâdiya was released on 7 June in both France as. Nâdiya stated the album would have more rock influence than her previous two albums. SNEP recently revealed the best-selling singles during the first quarter of 2006 (from 1 January – 31 March 2006). Despite being released four weeks before the first quarter of 2006 ended, "Tous ces mots" managed to peak at number thirteen in the list. The second single with the applicable title "Roc", was released two weeks after the album's release date, on 19 June. The music video to the song shows Nâdiya performing the song in a big stadium. The song follows "Tous ces mots" by debuting and peaking at number two (for four consecutive weeks) in France. It also became Nâdiya's longest single running in the top ten, being eleven weeks in the chart and still in the top 5. In Switzerland, the single is less successful, debuting at number thirty and peaking one ahead at twenty-nine in its following week. As the third single off the album, "Amies-ennemies" was released on 31 October, reaching the number four (#4) position in the French singles chart. The song samples a Chopin song and stayed in the French top ten for 11 weeks, only two weeks less than previous single "Roc."

Nâdiya started recording a new album after the release of "Amies-ennemies" ("Friends-Enemies"). It turned out to be a greatest hits, called La Source ("The Source"). The album's lead single is "Vivre ou Survivre" ("Live or Survive"). Upon release of "Vivre ou Survivre", the official website mentioned the tour, to start on 8 March, finishing with the grand finale and last concert on 31 May 2008, held in the 'Palais des Sports' (Sports Palace) in Paris. The song became her ninth top 40 hit.

On 22 April, Nâdiya entered the French Singles Chart peaking at number one with her duet with Enrique Iglesias "Tired of Being Sorry (Laisse le destin l'emporter)" ("Let Destiny Fulfill Itself"). The song is her first No. 1 single in the French charts, as three previous singles only reached the second position. This single did not leave its dominative top-position for 11 consecutive weeks before falling at No. 2, keeping the second place for 6 consecutive weeks. The song currently, as of 19 November, stands at No. 40 in the most successful singles in France in terms of chart positions.

Later, Nâdiya's official website was updated with the news that Nâdiya would release a new studio album on 1 December 2008. The name was later confirmed to be Électron Libre. Near the end of September 2008, a duet recorded by Nâdiya and Kelly Rowland "No Future in the Past" was sent to radio stations in France, functioning as the first single from Nâdiya's upcoming album.

Nâdiya was nominated for the 2009 NRJ Music Awards in the categories 'Group / duet / troupe of the year' (with Enrique Iglesias) and 'French female artist of the year'.

In 2011, she participated in the second season of Danse avec les stars – the French version of Dancing with the Stars. She was partnered with professional dancer Christophe Licata. On 15 October 2011, they were eliminated finishing 8th out of 9 contestants.

In 2017, Nâdiya announced her return with the release of a new single Unity produced by her own label N4Z Records.

In June 2018, Nâdiya announced the release of her 6th album Odyssey for the fall. August 2018, she announced the release of her second single Nirvâna.

Meanwhile, Nâdiya launched her own accessories brand dedicated to the art of living, DMYD (Detail Makes Your Difference) with a range of jewellery, candles, home fragrances and cosmetics.

== Discography ==
=== Albums ===
Changer les Choses

- Released: 5 November 2001
- Label: Sony BMG France
- Singles: "J'ai confiance en toi", "Chaque fois"

16/9

- Released: 28 May 2004
- Label: Sony BMG France
- Chart position: #6 France, No. 76 Switzerland
- Certification: France: 2× Platinum
- Singles: "Parle-moi", "Et c'est parti...", "Si loin de vous", "Signes"

Nâdiya

- Released: 5 June 2006
- Label: Columbia
- Chart position: #1 France, No. 14 Switzerland, No. 17 EU, No. 34 Belgium
- Certification: France: Platinum
- Singles: "Tous ces mots", "Roc", "Amies-ennemies"

La Source

- Released: 12 November 2007
- Label: Sony BMG France
- Chart position: #35 France
- Singles: "Vivre ou Survivre"

Électron Libre

- Released: 8 December 2008
- Label: Columbia
- Chart position: #69 France, No. 61 Belgium
- Singles: "Tired of Being Sorry (Laisse le destin l'emporter) (duet with Enrique Iglesias),
  "No Future in the Past (featuring Kelly Rowland)", "J'irai Jusque Là"

Odyssée

- Released: 22 February 2019
- Label: N4Z
- Singles: "Unity", "Top", "Nirvana", "Victory"

=== Singles ===
Year	Single	Chart positions					French certification	Album
Year	Single	FR	SUI	BEL (Fl)	BEL (Wa)	EU	French certification	Album
1997	"Dénoue mes mains"	—	—	—	—	—	—	—
2000	"J'ai confiance en toi"	38	—	—	—	—	—	Changer les Choses
2001	"Chaque fois"	27	—	—	—	—	—	Changer les Choses
2004	"Parle-moi"	2	11	—	2	9	Gold	16/9
2004	"Et c'est parti..."	5	21	1	2	15	Gold	16/9
2004	"Si loin de vous (Hey oh... par la radio)"	6	27	10	4	26	Gold	16/9
2005	"Signes"	Did not chart (digital single)						16/9
2006	"Tous ces mots" ^{1} (feat. Smartzee)	2	25	29	4	24	Gold	Nâdiya
2006	"Roc" ^{1}	2	29	—	2	19	Gold	Nâdiya
2006	"Amies-ennemies" ^{1}	4	40	—	3	30	Silver	Nâdiya
2007	"Vivre ou survivre"	26	—	—	—	182	—	La Source
2008	"À mon père (feat Idir)"	Did not chart (digital single)						La Source
2008	"Tired of Being Sorry (Laisse le destin l'emporter)" (with Enrique Iglesias)	1	6	—	1	10	Platinum	Électron Libre
2008	"No Future in the Past" (featuring Kelly Rowland)	—	—	—	—	—	—	Électron Libre
2009	"J'irai Jusque Là"	—	—	—	—	—	—	Électron Libre
2009	"Miss You" (featuring Enrique Iglesias)	—	—	—	—	—		Électron Libre
2017	"Unity"	—	—	—	—	—	—	Odyssée
2018	"Top"	—	—	—	—	—	—	Odyssée
2019	"Victory"	—	—	—	—	—	—	Odyssée
2019	"Nirvana"	—	—	—	—	—		Odyssée

- ^{1}: Sales till the end of 2006. The sales numbers are for both the physical CD sales as well as downloads.

=== DVDs ===
Changer les choses – Digipack Edition (CD/DVD release with Changer les choses album. It contains a documentary and music videos.)

- Released: 2001
- Label: Sony BMG France

L'histoire en 16/9 (It contains music videos, interview, photo gallery and a bonus CD.)

- Released: 4 April 2005
- Label: Sony BMG France
- Certification: France: Platinum

Nâdiya (CD/DVD release with Nâdiya album. It contains a documentary and music videos.)

- Released: 5 June 2006
- Label: Sony BMG France

=== Awards ===
- 2005 Victoires de la musique – rap/hip-hop/R&B album of the year (16/9)
