= Si loin de vous (Hey oh... par la radio) =

Single by Nâdiya

from the album 16/9
- Released: 19 November 2004 (FR/SWI); 27 December 2004 (EU)
- Recorded: 2003
- Genre: R&B, pop
- Length: 3:55
- Label: Columbia
- Songwriters: Thierry Gronfier, Nâdiya, Mehdy Boussaïd
- Producer: Thierry Gronfier

Nâdiya singles chronology
"Et c'est parti..." (2004)	"Si loin de vous (Hey oh... par la radio)" (2004)	"Signes" (2005)

Alternative cover
- Maxi single cover

Music video
- "Si loin de vous" on YouTube

"Si loin de vous (Hey oh... par la radio)" is a song recorded by the French-born R&B singer Nâdiya and written by Thierry Gronfier, Nâdiya and Mehdy Boussaïd. It was released as the third single released from her second best-selling studio album to date, 16/9. The single was released during the fourth quarter of 2004, being released in November in France and Switzerland and in December in some several other European countries.

== Inspiration ==
The main whistle in the melody is inspired from "Pulstar" by Vangelis, an electronic music from the 1976 album Albedo 0.39.

== Chart performance ==
On 22 December 2004, the song was certified gold meaning over 100,000 copies were sold, one month after its release by the Syndicat National de l'Édition Phonographique, the French certifier, becoming Nâdiya's fastest certified single. In total, over 191,000 copies were sold of "Si loin de vous" in France, close to receiving a platinum certification. The song peaked at number forty-six in the 2004 French singles year-end chart (with former singles "Parle-moi" (number 22) and "Et c'est parti..." (number 30) appearing in the year-end chart too) and number 72 in the 2005 edition.

== Track listings ==
- CD single (11:45)
1. "Si loin de vous (Hey oh... par la radio)" (radio edit) — 3:55
2. "Si loin de vous (Hey oh... par la radio)" (karaoke version) — 3:55
3. "Si loin de vous (Hey oh... par la radio)" (video)
- Maxi single (18:14)
1. "Si loin de vous (Hey oh... par la radio)" (radio edit) — 3:55
2. "Si loin de vous (Hey oh... par la radio)" (6Mondini remix) — 5:33
3. "Si loin de vous (Hey oh... par la radio)" (instrumental) — 3:51
4. "Et c'est parti..." (6mondini remix) — 4:59

== Versions and remixes ==
- Album version
- Radio edit
- Instrumental
- 6Mondini Remix
- Karaoke version

== Charts and sales ==
=== Weekly charts ===
Chart (2004/05)	Peak position
Belgium (Flanders) Singles Chart	10
Belgium (Wallonia) Singles Chart	4
French SNEP Singles Chart	6
Swiss Singles Chart	27

=== Year-end charts ===
Chart (2004)	Position
French Singles Chart	46
Chart (2005)	Position
Belgian (Flanders) Singles Chart	50
Belgian (Wallonia) Singles Chart	45
Europe (Eurochart Hot 100)	94
French Singles Chart	72

=== Certifications ===
Certifications for "Si loin de vous (Hey oh... par la radio)"
Region	Certification	Certified units/sales
France (SNEP)	Silver	125,000^{*}
^{*} Sales figures based on certification alone.
