= Et c'est parti... =

Single by Nâdiya featuring Smartzee

from the album 16/9
- B-side: "Space"
- Released: June 2004
- Recorded: 2004
- Genre: R&B; hip hop
- Length: 3:53
- Label: Sony
- Songwriters: Thierry Gronfier; Nâdiya; Mehdy Boussaïd; Hector Zounon
- Producer: Thierry Gronfier

Nâdiya singles chronology
"Parle-moi" (2004)	"Et c'est parti..." (2004)	"Si loin de vous" (2004)

Smartzee singles chronology
"Et c'est parti..." (2004)	"Tous ces mots" (2006)

Music video
- "Et c'est parti..." on YouTube

"Et c'est parti..." is a song recorded by the France-born R&B singer Nâdiya, featuring the English rapper Smartzee. The song was released as the second single off her 2004 second studio album 16/9 in June 2004. It was the first single she released outside of the usual France and Switzerland, and achieved success.

== Chart performance ==
Europe-wide, it's her best-selling single, being the only one that charted in the Netherlands. The single went straight to number one in Belgium, number five in France and number twenty-one in both Switzerland and the Netherlands.

"Et c'est parti..." was certified silver three months after its release by SNEP, for selling over 125,000 copies in France. The single peaked at number thirty (#30) in the 2004 French singles year end chart, eight places behind former single "Parle-moi" (#22).

== Track listings ==
CD single (12:47)

1. "Et c'est parti..." (radio edit) — 3:53
2. "Space" (album version) — 4:50
3. "Parle-moi" (karaoke version) — 4:04

CD maxi (17:41)

1. "Et c'est parti..." (radio edit) — 3:53
2. "Et c'est parti..." (6Mondini remix) — 4:59
3. "Parle-moi" (6Mondini remix) — 5:00
4. "Et c'est parti..." (instrumental) — 3:49

7" maxi

A-side:

1. "Et c'est parti..." (6Mondini mix)
2. "Et c'est parti..." (tek mix by 6Mondini)

B-side:

1. "Et c'est parti..." (radio edit)
2. "Et c'est parti..." (instrumental)

CD single - Promo

1. "Et c'est parti..." (radio edit) — 3:53

== Versions and remixes ==
- Album version
- Radio edit
- Instrumental
- 6Mondini remix
- Tek mix

== Charts ==
=== Peak positions ===
Chart (2004–2005)	Peak position
Belgium (Flanders) Singles Chart	1
Belgium (Wallonia) Singles Chart	2
Dutch Singles Chart	21
French SNEP Singles Chart	5
Swiss Singles Chart	21

=== Year-end charts ===
Chart (2004)	Position
Belgian (Flanders) Singles Chart	46
Belgian (Wallonia) Singles Chart	11
French Club Chart	6
French Singles Chart	30
Swiss Singles Chart	88
Chart (2005)	Position
Belgian (Flanders) Singles Chart	16

== Certifications ==
Certifications for "Et c'est parti..."
Region	Certification	Certified units/sales
Belgium (BRMA)	Gold	25,000^{*}
France (SNEP)	Silver	125,000^{*}
^{*} Sales figures based on certification alone.
