= Roc (Nâdiya song) =

Single by Nâdiya

from the album Nâdiya
- B-side: "Inch'Allah"
- Released: June 19, 2006
- Recorded: 2006
- Genre: R&B, dance-pop, pop rock
- Length: 3:39
- Label: Columbia
- Songwriters: Géraldine Delacoux, Mehdy Bousaïd, Thierry Gronfier

Nâdiya singles chronology
"Tous ces mots" (2006)	"Roc" (2006)	"Amies-ennemies" (2006)

Music video
- "Roc" on YouTube

"Roc" is a song recorded by the French-born singer Nâdiya, which appears on her self-titled third album Nâdiya. The single was released as the second single from the album on June 19 in Switzerland and France, 2006, two weeks after the release of the album. The single became her best-performing single in the French Singles Chart, staying in the top five for eleven weeks and eighteen weeks in the top thirty. It contains a sample taken from War composed by Survivor for the soundtrack of Rocky IV in 1985.

== Chart performance ==
The single entered the French Top 100 Singles chart at number two (#2) in the chart edition of June 24. The Crazy Frog's "We Are the Champions" topped the chart then. In its following two weeks, the single remained at the number 2 position, unable to get the Crazy Frog from its number one position. In its fourth week, the "Zidane y va marquer" of Cauet jumped from No. 60 to No. 1, again making it unable for "Roc" to top the chart. After being at the number 2 position for four weeks, the single dropped to number 4 in the chart to stay here for another four weeks. In its ninth week, it jumped up one place up to number 3, overmastering Cauet's "Zidane y va marquer", which dropped to number 4. In its tenth and eleventh week, it remained on the number 4 position again. After many weeks at number four, the single finally stepped out of the top 5 and went to number 6. The weeks after, it kept on dropping in the chart.

In December 2006, the Syndicat National de l'Edition Phonographique (SNEP) released a document with the best-selling singles from the first till the third quarter of 2006 (from January 1 till September 30). In this document, "Roc" ranked number twelve (#12), with the preceding single "Tous ces mots" peaking at number thirteen (#13). On the same website, a top 50 has been composed with the best-downloaded songs in 2006, with "Roc" peaking at number twenty-nine (#29).

The single was Nâdiya's longest one running in the French singles chart, up to the point where the next single "Amies-ennemies" broke its record by being a week longer in the chart and still charting (as of April 21).

== Track listings ==
CD single (11:47)

1. "Roc" (album version) – 3:39
2. "Inch'Allah" – 4:31
3. "Roc" (instrumental) – 3:37
4. "Roc" (video) [bonus]

== Charts ==
Chart (2006)	Peak position
Belgium (Wallonia) Singles Chart	2
French SNEP Singles Chart	2
French Digital Chart	4
Swiss Singles Chart	29

End of year chart (2006)	Position
Belgian (Wallonia) Singles Chart	8
French Singles Chart	16
French Digital Chart	29

== Certifications ==
Certifications for "Roc"
Region	Certification	Certified units/sales
France (SNEP)	Gold	200,000^{*}
^{*} Sales figures based on certification alone.
